= Pakistani cricket team in South Africa in 2012–13 =

| | South Africa | Pakistan |
- Dates: 1 February – 24 March
| Captains | Graeme Smith (Tests); AB de Villiers (ODIs); Faf du Plessis (T20Is) | Misbah-ul-Haq (Tests & ODIs); Mohammad Hafeez (T20Is) |

Test series
- Result: South Africa won the 3-match series 3–0
| Most runs | AB de Villiers (352) | Asad Shafiq (199) |
| Most wickets | Dale Steyn (20) | Saeed Ajmal (11) |
- Player of the series: AB de Villiers (SA)

One Day International series
- Results: South Africa won the 5-match series 3–2
| Most runs | AB de Villiers (367) | Misbah-ul-Haq (227) |
| Most wickets | Ryan McLaren (10) | Mohammad Irfan (11) |
- Player of the series: AB de Villiers (SA)

Twenty20 International series
- Results: Pakistan won the 2-match series 1–0
| Most runs | AB de Villiers (36) | Mohammad Hafeez (86) |
| Most wickets | Chris Morris (2); Rory Kleinveldt (2) | Umar Gul (5) |

The Pakistani cricket team toured South Africa from 1 February to 24 March 2013. The tour consisted of two Twenty20 Internationals (T20Is), three Test matches and five One Day Internationals (ODIs). South Africa announced their summer schedule of January–March in which they replaced their traditional Boxing Day Test with a T20I for the 2012–13 home season, during which they hosted New Zealand and Pakistan.

During the third ODI, Hashim Amla and AB de Villiers set a new world record for the third-wicket, with a partnership of 238 runs. This beat the previous record of 237 set by Rahul Dravid and Sachin Tendulkar against Kenya in 1999.

South Africa won the ODI series 3-2.

== Squads ==
| Tests | | T20Is | | ODIs | |
| Pakistan | South Africa | Pakistan | South Africa | Pakistan | South Africa |
|---|---|---|---|---|---|
| Nasir Jamshed; Mohammad Hafeez; Azhar Ali; Younis Khan; Misbah-ul-Haq (c); Asad Shafiq; Sarfraz Ahmed (wk); Umar Gul; Junaid Khan; Mohammad Irfan; Saeed Ajmal; Taufeeq Umar ^{3}; Haris Sohail ^{4}; Faisal Iqbal; Ehsan Adil; Abdur Rehman; Tanvir Ahmed ^{1}; Rahat Ali ^{1}; Imran Farhat ^{3} | Graeme Smith (c); Hashim Amla; AB de Villiers (wk); Jacques Kallis; Faf du Plessis; Dean Elgar; Alviro Petersen; Rory Kleinveldt; Jacques Rudolph; Vernon Philander; Morne Morkel; Dale Steyn; Robin Peterson; Imran Tahir ^{2}; Kyle Abbott ^{5} | Nasir Jamshed; Mohammad Hafeez (c); Ahmed Shehzad; Shoaib Malik; Umar Akmal; Umar Amin; Kamran Akmal (wk); Shahid Afridi; Umar Gul; Junaid Khan; Saeed Ajmal; Mohammad Irfan; Wahab Riaz; Asad Ali; Zulfiqar Babar | Faf du Plessis (c); Kyle Abbott; Farhaan Behardien; Henry Davids; Quinton de Kock (wk); AB de Villiers; Rory Kleinveldt; Ryan McLaren; David Miller; Chris Morris; Justin Ontong; Robin Peterson; Aaron Phangiso; Lonwabo Tsotsobe | Nasir Jamshed; Mohammad Hafeez; Younis Khan; Misbah-ul-Haq (c); Shoaib Malik; Umar Akmal; Kamran Akmal (wk); Shahid Afridi; Umar Gul; Junaid Khan; Saeed Ajmal; Mohammad Irfan; Wahab Riaz; Asad Shafiq; Imran Farhat; Abdur Rehman | AB de Villiers (c) (wk); Kyle Abbott; Hashim Amla; Farhaan Behardien; Faf du Plessis; Colin Ingram; Rory Kleinveldt; Ryan McLaren; David Miller; Morne Morkel; Robin Peterson; Aaron Phangiso; Graeme Smith; Dale Steyn; Lonwabo Tsotsobe |

Notes

- ^{1} Tanvir Ahmed and Rahat Ali have been called for the tour considering the fast bowling conditions there.
- ^{2} Imran Tahir has been added to the squad for first test as cover for the injured Robin Peterson.
- ^{3} Imran Farhat has been called to replace Taufeeq Umar who would fly back to Pakistan due to an injury.
- ^{4} Haris Sohail flew back to Pakistan due to an injury.
- ^{5} Kyle Abbott was included in the squad for the third Test in place of the injured Morne Morkel.

== Tour Matches ==
=== First Class : Pakistanis v SA Invitational XI ===
25–28 January 2013
Scorecard

| Pakistanis | v | SA Invitational XI |
| 329 (102.3 overs); Sarfraz Ahmed 93 (161); Simon Harmer 5/88 (35.3 overs) | | 257 (76.5 Overs); Vaughn van Jaarsveld 92 (125); Saeed Ajmal 3/66 (27.0 Overs) |
| 250/9d (84.4 overs); Mohammad Hafeez 83 (109); Kyle Abbott 4/26 (13.4 overs) | | 190/5; Justin Ontong 51* (97); Mohammad Irfan 2/26 |

Match Drawn
Buffalo Park, East London
Umpires: Ian Howell (SA) and Dennis Smith (SA)

- Pakistan won the toss and elected to bat.
- Rain stopped the play on day 1 after 66 overs.

=== Two-day : Pakistanis v Emerging Cape Cobras ===
10–11 February 2013
Scorecard

| Emerging Cape Cobras | v | Pakistanis |
| 156 (58.5 overs); Matthew Kleinveldt 36 (61); Mohammad Irfan 4/20 (12 overs) | | 176/6d (50 overs); Asad Shafiq 45* (96); Johannes Bothma 3/24 (11 overs) |
| 78 (29 overs); Keegan Petersen 33 (47); Mohammad Irfan 3/20 (7 overs) | | 126/1 (43 overs); Younis Khan 74* (162); Johannes Bothma 1/10 (7 overs) |

Pakistanis won by 10 wickets
Wally Wilson Oval, Cape Town
Umpires: Earl Hendrikse (SA) and Adrian Holdstock (SA)

- Emerging Cape Cobras won the toss and elected to bat.

=== List A : Pakistanis v SA Invitational XI ===
6 March 2013
14.30 (D/N)
Scorecard

| SA Invitational XI; 266/8 (50 overs) | v | Pakistanis; 270/9 (49.4 overs) |
| Quinton de Kock 65 (73); Shoaib Malik 2/47 (8 overs) | | Kamran Akmal 47 (49); Hardus Viljoen 3/29 (10 overs) |

Pakistanis won by 1 wicket
De Beers Diamond Oval, Kimberley
Umpires: Johan Cloete (SA) and Shaun George (SA)

- South African Invitation XI won the toss and elected to bat.

== Test series ==
=== 1st Test ===
1–6 February
Scorecard

| South Africa | v | Pakistan |
| 253 (85.2 overs); Jacques Kallis 50 (78); Mohammad Hafeez 4/16 (7.2 overs) | | 49 (29.1 overs); Azhar Ali 13 (46); Dale Steyn 6/8 (8.1 overs) |
| 275/3d (62 overs); AB de Villiers 103* (117); Umar Gul 2/58 (14 overs) | | 257 (100.4 overs); Misbah-ul-Haq 64 (167); Dale Steyn 5/52 (28.4 overs) |

South Africa won by 211 runs
New Wanderers Stadium, Johannesburg
Umpires: Billy Bowden (NZ) and Bruce Oxenford (Aus)
Player of the match: Dale Steyn (SA)

- South Africa won the toss and elected to bat.
- Nasir Jamshed and Rahat Ali (both Pak), made their Test debuts.

=== 2nd Test ===
14–17 February
Scorecard

| Pakistan | v | South Africa |
| 338 (116.2 overs); Younis Khan 111 (226); Vernon Philander 5/59 (26 overs) | | 326 (102.1 overs); Robin Peterson 84 (106); Saeed Ajmal 6/96 (42 overs) |
| 169 (75.3 overs); Azhar Ali 65 (193); Vernon Philander 4/40 (19 overs) | | 182/6 (43.1 overs); Hashim Amla 58 (96); Saeed Ajmal 4/51 (18.1 overs) |

South Africa won by 4 wickets
Newlands Cricket Ground, Cape Town
Umpires: Steve Davis (Aus) and Bruce Oxenford (Aus)
Player of the match: Robin Peterson (SA)

- South Africa won the toss and elected to field.
- Mohammad Irfan (Pak) made his Test debut.

=== 3rd Test ===
22–24 February
Scorecard

| South Africa | v | Pakistan |
| 409 (103.2 overs); AB de Villiers 121 (215); Rahat Ali 6/127 (27.2 overs) | | 156 (46.4 overs); Younus Khan 33 (86); Kyle Abbott 7/29 (11.4 overs) |
| | | 235 (f/o) (78 overs); Imran Farhat 43 (91); Dale Steyn 4/80 (23 overs) |

South Africa won by an innings and 18 runs
Supersport Park, Centurion
Umpires: Billy Bowden (NZ) and Steve Davis (Aus)
Player of the match: Kyle Abbott (SA)

- South Africa won the toss and elected to bat.
- Ehsan Adil (Pak) and Kyle Abbott (SA) made their Test debuts.

== T20I series ==
=== 1st T20I ===
1 March
Scorecard

| South Africa | v | Pakistan |

Match abandoned without a ball bowled
Kingsmead, Durban
Umpires: Shaun George (SA) and Adrian Holdstock (SA)

- Pakistan Won the toss and elected to field.
- Heavy rain prevented any play.

=== 2nd T20I ===
3 March
14:30
Scorecard

| Pakistan; 195/7 (20 overs) | v | South Africa; 100 (12.2 overs) |
| Mohammad Hafeez 86 (51); Rory Kleinveldt 2/27 (4 overs) | | AB de Villiers 36 (22); Umar Gul 5/6 (2.2 overs) |

Pakistan won by 95 runs
Supersport Park, Centurion
Umpires: Johan Cloete (SA) and Shaun George (SA)
Player of the match: Mohammad Hafeez (Pak)

- Pakistan won the toss and elected to bat.
- Kyle Abbott (SA) made his T20I debut.

== ODI series ==
=== 1st ODI ===
10 March
10:00
Scorecard

| South Africa; 315/4 (50 overs) | v | Pakistan; 190 (36.2 overs) |
| Colin Ingram 105* (104); Saeed Ajmal 2/53 (10 overs) | | Misbah-ul-Haq 38 (44); Rory Kleinveldt 4/22 (5.2 overs) |

South Africa won by 125 runs
Chevrolet Park, Bloemfontein
Umpires: Johan Cloete (SA) and Kumar Dharmasena (SL)
Player of the match: Colin Ingram (SA)

- Pakistan won the toss and elected to field.
- Kyle Abbott (SA) made his ODI debut.

=== 2nd ODI ===
15 March
Scorecard

| South Africa; 191 (43.2 overs) | v | Pakistan; 192/4 (39.2 overs) |
| Farhaan Behardien 58 (82); Mohammad Irfan 4/33 (7 overs) | | Misbah-ul-Haq 57* (75); Robin Peterson 4/52 (8 overs) |

Pakistan won by 6 wickets
Supersport Park, Centurion
Umpires: Billy Bowden (NZ) and Adrian Holdstock (SA)
Player of the match: Mohammad Irfan (Pak)

- South Africa won the toss and elected to bat.

=== 3rd ODI ===
17 March
10:00
Scorecard

| South Africa; 343/5 (50 overs) | v | Pakistan; 309 (48.1 overs) |
| AB de Villiers 128 (108); Mohammad Irfan 2/34 (7 overs) | | Shahid Afridi 88 (48); Ryan McLaren 3/56 (9.0 overs) |

South Africa won by 34 runs
New Wanderers Stadium, Johannesburg
Umpires: Billy Bowden (NZ) and Shaun George (SA)
Player of the match: Hashim Amla and AB de Villiers (both SA)

- Pakistan won the toss and elected to field.

=== 4th ODI ===
21 March
10:00

| South Africa; 234/9 (50 overs) | v | Pakistan; 236/7 (42.4 overs) |
| AB de Villiers 75 (108); Saeed Ajmal 3/42 (10 overs) | | Imran Farhat 93 (144); Robin Peterson 5/46 (10 overs) |

Pakistan won by 3 wickets
Kingsmead, Durban
Umpires: Kumar Dharmasena (SL) and Shaun George (SA)
Player of the match: Misbah-ul-Haq (Pak)

- South Africa won the toss and elected to bat.

=== 5th ODI ===
24 March
10:00
Scorecard

| Pakistan; 205 (49.1 overs) | v | South Africa; 208/4 (44 overs) |
| Kamran Akmal 48 (51); Ryan McLaren 3/32 (10 overs) | | AB de Villiers 95* (111); Mohammad Irfan 2/38 (10 overs) |

South Africa won by 6 wickets
Willowmoore Park, Benoni
Umpires: Billy Bowden (NZ) and Johan Cloete (SA)
Player of the match: AB de Villiers (SA)

- Pakistan won the toss and elected to bat.

== Broadcasters ==
| Country | TV Broadcaster(s) |
|---|---|
| Australia | Nine Network |
| Australia | Fox Sports |
| United Kingdom | Sky Sports |
| Pakistan | PTV Sports |
| Pakistan | TEN Sports |
| India | TEN Cricket |
| South Africa | SuperSport |
