= Pakistani cricket team in New Zealand in 2010–11 =

Pakistani cricket team

Pakistan cricket team in New Zealand in 2010
	Pakistan	New Zealand
- Dates: 26 December 2010 – 5 February 2011
Captains	Misbah Ul-Haq (Tests); Shahid Afridi	Daniel Vettori; Ross Taylor (Twenty20)

Test series
- Result: Pakistan won the 2-match series 1–0
Most runs	Misbah-ul-Haq (231)	Martin Guptill (163)
Most wickets	Umar Gul (13)	Chris Martin (9)

One Day International series
- Results: Pakistan won the 6-match series 3–2
Most runs	Misbah-ul-Haq (203)	Martin Guptill (209)
Most wickets	Wahab Riaz (8)	Hamish Bennett (11)

Twenty20 International series
- Results: New Zealand won the 3-match series 2–1
Most runs	Mohammad Hafeez (104)	Martin Guptill (98)
Most wickets	Shahid Afridi (5)	Tim Southee (8)

The Pakistan cricket team toured New Zealand from December 2010 till February 2011 to play two Tests, three Twenty20s (T20) and six One Day Internationals (ODIs). Three tests were initially planned but as the 2011 Cricket World Cup was held from February to April, one test was dropped and one ODI and the three T20s were added.

== Tour matches ==
23 December
Scorecard

Pakistan; 91 (17.4 overs)	v	Auckland; 92/5 (13.2 overs)
Umar Akmal 25 (29); Michael Bates 4/11 (3 overs)		Martin Guptill 28* (30); Saeed Ajmal 2/20 (4 overs)

Auckland won by 5 wickets
Colin Maiden Park, Auckland
Umpires: Chris Gaffaney (NZ) and Evan Gray (NZ)

- Auckland won the toss and elected to field.

2 – 4 January 2011
Scorecard

New Zealand Cricket XI	v	Pakistan
384 (100.2 overs); Brendon McCullum 206 (218); Sohail Tanvir 4/63 (19.2 overs)		287 (93.2 overs); Misbah-ul-Haq 126* (258); Daniel Vettori 3/30 (23 overs)
111/4 (32 overs); James Franklin 30 (40); Umar Gul 2/19 (6 overs)

Match drawn
Cobham Oval, Whangārei
Umpires: Barry Frost and Chris Gaffaney

- New Zealand Cricket XI won the toss and elected to bat.

== Twenty20 series ==
=== 1st T20I ===
26 December
Scorecard

Pakistan; 143/9 (20 overs)	v	New Zealand; 146/5 (17.1 overs)
Wahab Riaz 30* (21); Tim Southee 5/18 (4 overs)		Martin Guptill 54 (29); Shoaib Akhtar 3/38 (4 overs)

New Zealand won by 5 wickets
Eden Park, Auckland
Umpires: Billy Bowden and Barry Frost (both NZ)
Player of the match: Tim Southee (NZ)

- New Zealand won the toss and elected to field.

New Zealand bowler Tim Southee took five wickets in eight balls, including a hat-trick. He became the first New Zealander to take a five wicket haul in an T20I match.

=== 2nd T20I ===
28 December
Scorecard

New Zealand; 185/7 (20 overs)	v	Pakistan; 146/9 (20 overs)
Martin Guptill 44 (28); Saeed Ajmal 3/35 (4 overs)		Mohammad Hafeez 46 (30); Nathan McCullum 4/16 (4 overs)

New Zealand won by 39 runs
Seddon Park, Hamilton
Umpires: Gary Baxter (NZ) and Chris Gaffaney (NZ)
Player of the match: Nathan McCullum (NZ)

- Pakistan won the toss and elected to field.

=== 3rd T20I ===
30 December
Scorecard

Pakistan; 183/6 (20 overs)	v	New Zealand; 80 (15.5 overs)
Ahmed Shehzad 54 (34); James Franklin 2/12 (3 overs)		Scott Styris 45 (34); Shahid Afridi 4/14 (2.5 overs)

Pakistan won by 103 runs
AMI Stadium, Christchurch
Umpires: Gary Baxter (NZ) and Chris Gaffaney (NZ)
Player of the match: Abdul Razzaq (Pak)

- Pakistan won the toss and elected to bat.

== Test series ==
=== 1st Test ===
7 – 9 January
Scorecard

New Zealand	v	Pakistan
275 (97.5 overs); Brendon McCullum 56 (77); Tanvir Ahmed 4/63 (18.5 overs)		367 (122.1 overs); Asad Shafiq 83 (202); Brent Arnel 4/95 (28 overs)
110 (38.3 overs); Brendon McCullum 35 (46); Abdur Rehman 3/24 (15 overs)		21/0 (3.4 overs); Taufeeq Umar 12* (15)

Pakistan won by 10 wickets
Seddon Park, Hamilton
Umpires: Daryl Harper and Rod Tucker (both Aus)
Player of the match: Abdur Rehman (Pak)

- Pakistan won the toss and elected to field.

New Zealand bowler Chris Martin took his 500th wicket in first-class cricket, with the dismissal of Tanvir Ahmed.

=== 2nd Test ===
15–19 January
Scorecard

New Zealand	v	Pakistan
356 (127.1 overs); Daniel Vettori 110 (166); Umar Gul 4/87 (32 overs)		376 (133 overs); Misbah-ul-Haq 99 (207); Chris Martin 4/91 (32 overs)
293 (90.5 overs); Martin Guptill 73 (178); Umar Gul 4/61 (20.5 overs)		226/5 (92 overs); Younis Khan 81 (155); Tim Southee 2/49 (15 overs)

Match drawn
Basin Reserve, Wellington
Umpires: Daryl Harper and Rod Tucker (both Aus)
Player of the match: Misbah-ul-Haq (Pak)

- New Zealand won the toss and elected to bat.

Daniel Vettori's first innings score of 110 was his sixth century in Test cricket. Pakistan's wicket keeper, Adnan Akmal, took six catches in the first innings.

== ODI series ==
=== 1st ODI ===
22 January
14:00 (D/N)
Scorecard

Pakistan; 124 (37.3 overs)	v	New Zealand; 125/1 (17.2 overs)
Misbah-ul-Haq 50 (88); Tim Southee 5/33 (9.3 overs)		Jesse Ryder 55 (34); Sohail Tanvir 1/39 (7 overs)

New Zealand won by 9 wickets
Westpac Stadium, Wellington
Umpires: Chris Gaffaney (NZ) and Amiesh Saheba (Ind)
Player of the match: Tim Southee (NZ)

- Pakistan won the toss and elected to bat.

=== 2nd ODI ===
26 January
Scorecard

Pakistan; 31/0 (4.2 overs)	v	New Zealand
Ahmed Shehzad 25* (16)

No result
Queenstown Events Centre, Queenstown
Umpires: Chris Gaffaney (NZ) and Amiesh Saheba (Ind)

- New Zealand won the toss and elected to field.
- Match abandoned due to rain after 4.2 of the scheduled 48 overs.

=== 3rd ODI ===
29 January
Scorecard

Pakistan; 293/7 (50 overs)	v	New Zealand; 250/9 (50 overs)
Mohammad Hafeez 115 (144); Hamish Bennett 2/54 (7 overs)		Scott Styris 46 (67); Umar Gul 2/33 (10 overs)

Pakistan won by 43 runs
Lancaster Park, Christchurch
Umpires: Gary Baxter (NZ) and Amiesh Saheba (Ind)
Player of the match: Mohammad Hafeez (Pak)

- New Zealand won the toss and elected to field.

=== 4th ODI ===
1 February
Scorecard

New Zealand; 262/7 (50 overs)	v	Pakistan; 264/8 (49 overs)
James Franklin 62 (75); Wahab Riaz 3/51 (10 overs)		Misbah-ul-Haq 93* (91); Scott Styris 3/40 (9 overs)

Pakistan won by 2 wickets
McLean Park, Napier
Umpires: Gary Baxter (NZ) and Steve Davis (Aus)
Player of the match: Misbah-ul-Haq (Pak)

- New Zealand won the toss and elected to bat.

=== 5th ODI ===
3 February
Scorecard

Pakistan; 268/9 (50 overs)	v	New Zealand; 227 (46.5 overs)
Ahmed Shehzad 115 (109); Kyle Mills 2/42 (10 overs)		Ross Taylor 69 (91); Wahab Riaz 3/51 (8.5 overs)

Pakistan won by 41 runs
Seddon Park, Hamilton
Umpires: Steve Davis (Aus) and Tony Hill (NZ)
Player of the match: Ahmed Shehzad (Pak)

- New Zealand won the toss and elected to field.

=== 6th ODI ===
5 February
Scorecard

New Zealand; 311/7 (50 overs)	v	Pakistan; 254 (44.1 overs)
Jesse Ryder 107 (93); Abdul Razzaq 2/23 (7 overs)		Kamran Akmal 89 (84); Hamish Bennett 4/46 (8.1 overs)

New Zealand won by 57 runs
Eden Park, Auckland
Umpires: Steve Davis (Aus) and Tony Hill (NZ)
Player of the match: Jesse Ryder (NZ)

- Pakistan won the toss and elected to field.

== Media coverage ==
- NEO Cricket
- STAR Cricket
- SAB TV
- GEO Super
- Pakistan Television Corporation (PTV)
- Sky Sport (New Zealand)
- Sky Sports
