= Pakistani cricket team in Ireland in 2013 =

	Ireland	Pakistan
- Dates: 23 May – 26 May 2013
Captains	William Porterfield	Misbah-ul-Haq

One Day International series
- Results: Pakistan won the 2-match series 1–0
Most runs	Ed Joyce (148)	Mohammad Hafeez (124)
Most wickets	Alex Cusack (4)	Abdur Rehman (4)
- Player of the series: Kevin O'Brien (Ire)

The Pakistani cricket team toured Ireland from 23 May to 26 May 2013. The tour consisted of two One Day Internationals (ODIs). The matches were broadcast on YouTube.

== Squads ==
ODIs
Pakistan	Ireland
Misbah-ul-Haq (c); Mohammad Hafeez (vc); Kamran Akmal (wk); Abdur Rehman; Asad Ali; Asad Shafiq; Ehsan Adil; Imran Farhat; Junaid Khan; Mohammad Irfan; Nasir Jamshed; Saeed Ajmal; Shoaib Malik; Umar Amin; Wahab Riaz	

== ODI series ==
=== 1st ODI ===
23 May
10:45
Scorecard

Ireland; 275/5 (47 overs)	v	Pakistan; 266/5 (47 overs)
Paul Stirling 103 (107); Mohammad Hafeez 2/34 (9 overs)		Mohammad Hafeez 122* (113); Kevin O'Brien 2/43 (5 overs)

Match tied (D/L method)
Clontarf Cricket Club Ground, Dublin
Umpires: Ian Gould (Eng) and Richard Smith (Ire)
Player of the match: Kevin O'Brien (Ire)

- Pakistan won the toss and elected to bat.
- Ireland innings: Revised target 276 off 47 overs

=== 2nd ODI ===
26 May
10:45
Scorecard

Ireland; 229/9 (50 overs)	v	Pakistan; 230/8 (48.4 overs)
Ed Joyce 116* (132); Abdur Rehman 4/48 (10 overs)		Kamran Akmal 81 (85); Trent Johnston 2/35 (9.4 overs)

Pakistan won by 2 wickets
Clontarf Cricket Club Ground, Dublin
Umpires: Ian Gould (Eng) and Richard Smith (Ire)
Player of the match: Kamran Akmal (Pak)

- Pakistan won the toss and elected to field.
- James Shannon (Ire) and Asad Ali (Pak) made their ODI debuts.
