= Pakistani cricket team in Bangladesh in 2011–12 =

International cricket tour

	Bangladesh	Pakistan
- Dates: 29 November 2011 – 21 December 2011
Captains	Mushfiqur Rahim	Misbah-ul-Haq

Test series
- Result: Pakistan won the 2-match series 2–0
Most runs	Shakib Al Hasan (209)	Younus Khan (265)
Most wickets	Shakib Al Hasan (7)	Abdur Rehman (11)
- Player of the series: Younus Khan (Pak)

One Day International series
- Results: Pakistan won the 3-match series 3–0
Most runs	Nasir Hossain (124)	Umar Akmal (123)
Most wickets	Rubel Hossain (4)	Mohammad Hafeez (6)
- Player of the series: Umar Akmal (Pak)

Twenty20 International series
- Results: Pakistan won the 1-match series 1–0
Most runs	Nasir Hossain (35)	Mohammad Hafeez (25)
Most wickets	Alok Kapali (2); Shakib Al Hasan (2)	Shoaib Malik (2); Mohammad Hafeez (2)
- Player of the series: Mohammad Hafeez (Pak)

The Pakistan national cricket team toured Bangladesh from 29 November to 21 December 2011. The tour consisted of one Twenty20 International (T20I), three One Day Internationals (ODIs) and two Test matches, all of which were won by Pakistan.

== Squads ==
Tests		ODIs		T20	
Pakistan	Bangladesh	Pakistan	Bangladesh	Pakistan	Bangladesh
Misbah-ul-Haq (c); Mohammad Hafeez; Taufeeq Umar; Imran Farhat; Younus Khan; Asad Shafiq; Azhar Ali; Shoaib Malik; Adnan Akmal (wk); Saeed Ajmal; Abdur Rehman; Umar Gul; Aizaz Cheema; Mohammad Khalil; Mohammad Talha	Mushfiqur Rahim (c & wk); Mahmudullah; Elias Sunny; Mohammad Ashraful; Nasir Hossain; Nazimuddin; Nazmul Hossain; Robiul Islam; Rubel Hossain; Shahadat Hossain; Shahriar Nafees; Shakib Al Hasan; Suhrawadi Shuvo; Tamim Iqbal; Naeem Islam	Misbah-ul-Haq (c); Mohammad Hafeez; Shahid Afridi; Imran Farhat; Younus Khan; Asad Shafiq; Umar Akmal; Shoaib Malik; Sarfraz Ahmed (wk); Saeed Ajmal; Abdur Rehman; Umar Gul; Aizaz Cheema; Mohammad Khalil; Sohail Tanvir	Mushfiqur Rahim (c & wk); Mahmudullah; Abdur Razzak; Alok Kapali; Elias Sunny; Farhad Reza; Imrul Kayes; Naeem Islam; Nasir Hossain; Nazmul Hossain; Rubel Hossain; Shafiul Islam; Shahriar Nafees; Shakib Al Hasan; Tamim Iqbal	Misbah-ul-Haq (c); Mohammad Hafeez; Shahid Afridi; Imran Farhat; Younus Khan; Asad Shafiq; Umar Akmal; Shoaib Malik; Sarfraz Ahmed (wk); Saeed Ajmal; Abdur Rehman; Umar Gul; Aizaz Cheema; Mohammad Khalil; Sohail Tanvir	Mushfiqur Rahim (c & wk); Mahmudullah; Abdur Razzak; Alok Kapali; Elias Sunny; Farhad Reza; Imrul Kayes; Naeem Islam; Nasir Hossain; Nazmul Hossain; Rubel Hossain; Shafiul Islam; Shakib Al Hasan; Tamim Iqbal

== T20I series ==
=== Only T20I ===
29 November 2011 (D/N)
Scorecard

Pakistan; 135/7 (20 overs)	v	Bangladesh; 85/9 (20 overs)
Mohammad Hafeez 25 (31); Alok Kapali 2/12 (3 overs)		Nasir Hossain 35 (38); Shoaib Malik 2/7 (2 overs)

Pakistan won by 50 runs
Sher-e-Bangla Cricket Stadium, Mirpur
Umpires: Nadir Shah (Ban) and Sharfuddoula (Ban)
Player of the match: Mohammad Hafeez (Pak)

- Pakistan won the toss and elected to bat.

== ODI series ==
=== 1st ODI ===
1 December 2011
13:30 (D/N)
Scorecard

Bangladesh; 91 (30.3 overs)	v	Pakistan; 93/5 (25.4 overs)
Nasir Hossain 21 (40); Shahid Afridi 5/23 (6.3 overs)		Shahid Afridi 24* (23); Rubel Hossain 2/23 (8 overs)

Pakistan won by 5 wickets
Sher-e-Bangla Cricket Stadium, Mirpur
Umpires: Johan Cloete (SA) and Enamul Haque (Ban)
Player of the match: Shahid Afridi (Pak)

- Bangladesh won the toss and elected to bat.

=== 2nd ODI ===
3 December 2011
13:30 (D/N)
Scorecard

Pakistan; 262/7 (50 overs)	v	Bangladesh; 186/7 (50 overs)
Umar Akmal 59 (54); Shafiul Islam 2/50 (10 overs)		Nasir Hossain 100 (134); Umar Gul 4/36 (9 overs)

Pakistan won by 76 runs
Sher-e-Bangla Cricket Stadium, Mirpur
Umpires: Johan Cloete (SA) and Nadir Shah (Ban)
Player of the match: Nasir Hossain (Ban)

- Pakistan won the toss and elected to bat.

=== 3rd ODI ===
6 December 2011
Scorecard

Pakistan; 177 (46.1 overs)	v	Bangladesh; 119 (38 overs)
Umar Akmal 57 (84); Mahmudullah 3/4 (1.1 overs)		Mahmudullah 35 (73); Shoaib Malik 3/6 (4 overs)

Pakistan won by 58 runs
Zohur Ahmed Chowdhury Stadium, Chittagong
Umpires: Johan Cloete (SA) and Enamul Haque (Ban)
Player of the match: Umar Akmal (Pak)

- Pakistan won the toss and elected to bat.

== Test series ==
=== 1st Test ===
9–13 December 2011
Scorecard

Bangladesh	v	Pakistan
135 (51.2 overs); Nasir Hossain 41 (68); Abdur Rehman 3/9 (6.2 overs)		594/5d (176.5 overs); Younus Khan 200* (290); Elias Sunny 3/123 (47 overs)
275 (82.3 overs); Nazimuddin 78 (186); Abdur Rehman 4/88 (30 overs)

Pakistan won by an innings and 184 runs
Zohur Ahmed Chowdhury Stadium, Chittagong
Umpires: Billy Doctrove (WI) and Shavir Tarapore (Ind)
Player of the match: Younus Khan (Pak)

- Pakistan won the toss and elected to field.
- Nazimuddin (Ban) made his Test debut.

Bangladesh recalled 56-Test veteran and former captain Mohammad Ashraful to their side for the first Test in Chittagong; he had been dropped for the series against the West Indies earlier in the year. Nazimuddin, the captain of Chittagong Division, was selected to make his Test debut.

Pakistan won the toss and decided to bowl. Their bowlers duly tore through Bangladesh's batting lineup, bowling them out for 135 before the tea break on the first day. Debutant opener Nazimuddin was Bangladesh's longest-lasting batsman, surviving for 78 balls before being dismissed by Umar Gul for 31. All-rounder Nasir Hossain, batting at number eight, top scored with 41. Only one other batsman scored more than 10 runs. Pakistan's front-line bowlers shared the wickets: Abdur Rehman and Saeed Ajmal took three each; Gul and Aizaz Cheema took two.

Pakistan ended the first day on 132 runs for the loss of no wickets, thanks to an opening stand between Mohammad Hafeez and Taufeeq Umar. It was the 21st consecutive Test in which Hafeez and Taufeeq had opened for Pakistan, a record for the team. Taufeeq was dismissed the next morning, leg before wicket to Mahmudullah; Hafeez went on to score his fourth Test century, eventually falling for 143 runs. Pakistan continued to pile on the runs with another large partnership, a fifth-wicket stand of 259 runs between Younus Khan and Asad Shafiq over the Test's second and third days. Shafiq scored his first Test century before being dismissed for 104; Younus scored his third Test double century. Pakistan captain Misbah-ul-Haq declared with Younus not out for 200 and Pakistan at 594/5.

Bangladesh, needing 459 runs simply to force Pakistan to bat again, improved on their first innings total, but were dismissed for 275. Nazimuddin top-scored with 78, while Shakib Al Hasan also scored a half-century (51 off 69 balls). Rehman took four wickets, giving him seven for the match. Pakistan thus won by an innings and 184 runs. Younus was named player of the match.

=== 2nd Test ===
17–21 December 2011
Scorecard

Bangladesh	v	Pakistan
338 (107.2 overs); Shakib Al Hasan 144 (242); Aizaz Cheema 3/73 (26 overs)		470 (154.5 overs); Taufeeq Umar 130 (256); Shakib Al Hasan 6/82 (40.5 overs)
234 (82.1 overs); Nasir Hossain 79 (172); Abdur Rehman 4/51 (27 overs)		107/3 (20.5 overs); Mohammad Hafeez 47 (52); Elias Sunny 1/7 (0.5 overs)

Pakistan won by 7 wickets
Sher-e-Bangla Cricket Stadium, Mirpur
Umpires: Billy Doctrove (WI) and Shavir Tarapore (Ind)
Player of the match: Shakib Al Hasan (Ban)

- Pakistan won the toss and elected to field.
- Match start delayed by bad weather.

Bangladesh selectors dropped Mohammad Ashraful from the team after scoring only one run in the first Test. Bowlers Nazmul Hossain and Robiul Islam were brought into the side; fellow paceman Rubel Hossain was ruled out due to a shoulder injury. Pakistan entered the Test with an unchanged team.

Pakistan won the toss and again put Bangladesh in to bat. After their low first innings score in the first Test, Bangladesh's top order again fell quickly, sitting at 4/34 after Aizaz Cheema took three wickets. However, Shahriar Nafees and Shakib Al Hasan combined for a 180-run partnership, a record fifth-wicket stand for Bangladesh. Shahriar, under pressure to retain his position in the team, scored 97. By the end of the first day's play, Shakib had scored his second Test century. Shakib was run out the next morning for his highest Test score of 144, before Bangladesh's tail was dismissed quickly, leaving the team all out for 338. Cheema and Umar Gul took three wickets each.

Pakistan finished the second day of the test at 1/87. The following day, their batsmen accumulated runs carefully, with six out of their top seven batsmen scoring at least 40. Taufeeq Umar was the stand-out, with 130. They batted into the fourth day of the match, being bowled out for 470, raising the prospect of a drawn result. Shakib followed up his century in Bangladesh's first innings by taking six of Pakistan's wickets, becoming his country's first player to score a century and take five wickets in an innings in the same Test.

Bangladesh needed 132 runs to force Pakistan to bat again. They ended the fourth day of the match at 5/114, leaving Pakistan just five wickets from victory on the Test's final day. A partnership between Bangladesh captain Mushfiqur Rahim and Nasir Hossain lasting for the whole of the day's first session gave Bangladesh hope for drawing the match, but Abdur Rehman and Saeed Ajmal's spin bowled Bangladesh out in the second session, leaving Pakistan needing just over 100 runs in fading light to win the match. Pakistan reached the target at a rate of over five runs per over, sealing a 2–0 series win. Shakib was named the player of the match.
