= Sri Lankan cricket team against Pakistan in the UAE in 2013–14 =

International cricket tour

Pakistani cricket team vs Sri Lanka in the UAE in 2013–14
	Pakistan	Sri Lanka
- Dates: 11 December 2013 – 20 January 2014
Captains	Misbah-ul-Haq (Tests & ODIs); Mohammad Hafeez (T20Is)	Angelo Mathews (Tests & ODIs); Dinesh Chandimal (T20Is)

Test series
- Result: 3-match series drawn 1–1
Most runs	Misbah-ul-Haq (364)	Angelo Mathews (412)
Most wickets	Junaid Khan (14)	Rangana Herath (14)
- Player of the series: Angelo Mathews (Sri Lanka)

One Day International series
- Results: Pakistan won the 5-match series 3–2
Most runs	Mohammad Hafeez (448)	Dinesh Chandimal (195)
Most wickets	Junaid Khan (13)	Suranga Lakmal (6); Lasith Malinga (6)
- Player of the series: Mohammad Hafeez (Pakistan)

Twenty20 International series
- Results: 2-match series drawn 1–1
Most runs	Sharjeel Khan (84)	Kusal Perera (99)
Most wickets	Saeed Ajmal (4)	Sachithra Senanayake (4); Lasith Malinga (4)
- Player of the series: Shahid Afridi (Pakistan)

The Sri Lanka and Pakistan national cricket teams toured the United Arab Emirates (UAE) from 11 December 2013 to 20 January 2014. The tour included three Tests, five One Day Internationals (ODIs) and two Twenty20 Internationals (T20I) between Sri Lanka and Pakistan. Pakistan won the ODI series 3–2, while the Test and T20I series were both drawn 1–1.

== Squads ==
Tests		ODIs		T20I		
Pakistan	Sri Lanka	Pakistan	Sri Lanka	Pakistan	Sri Lanka	Afghanistan
Misbah-ul-Haq (C); Abdur Rehman; Adnan Akmal (wk); Ahmed Shehzad; Asad Shafiq; Azhar Ali; Junaid Khan; Khurram Manzoor; Mohammad Hafeez; Mohammad Talha; Rahat Ali; Saeed Ajmal; Shan Masood; Umar Gul; Younis Khan	Angelo Mathews (C); Dinesh Chandimal; Shaminda Eranga; Nuwan Pradeep; Vishwa Fernando; Rangana Herath; Mahela Jayawardene; Prasanna Jayawardene (wk); Dimuth Karunaratne; Nuwan Kulasekara; Suranga Lakmal; Dilruwan Perera; Kumar Sangakkara (wk); Sachithra Senanayake; Kaushal Silva; Lahiru Thirimanne	Misbah-ul-Haq (C); Abdur Rehman; Ahmed Shehzad; Anwar Ali; Asad Shafiq; Bilawal Bhatti; Haris Sohail; Junaid Khan; Mohammad Hafeez; Saeed Ajmal; Shahid Afridi; Sharjeel Khan; Sohaib Maqsood; Sohail Tanvir; Umar Akmal (wk)	Angelo Mathews (C); Dinesh Chandimal; Tillakaratne Dilshan; Rangana Herath; Dimuth Karunaratne; Nuwan Kulasekara; Suranga Lakmal; Lasith Malinga; Ajantha Mendis; Kusal Perera (wk); Thisara Perera; Seekkuge Prasanna; Ashan Priyanjan; Kumar Sangakkara (wk); Sachithra Senanayake; Lahiru Thirimanne; Kithuruwan Vithanage	Mohammad Hafeez (C); Usman Khan; Ahmed Shehzad; Anwar Ali; Bilawal Bhatti; Haris Sohail; Junaid Khan; Saeed Ajmal; Shahid Afridi; Sharjeel Khan; Sohaib Maqsood; Sohail Tanvir; Umar Akmal (wk); Umar Amin; Zulfiqar Babar	Dinesh Chandimal (C); Tillakaratne Dilshan; Nuwan Kulasekara; Suranga Lakmal; Lasith Malinga; Angelo Mathews; Ajantha Mendis; Kusal Perera (wk); Thisara Perera; Seekkuge Prasanna; Ramith Rambukwella; Kumar Sangakkara (wk); Sachithra Senanayake; Lahiru Thirimanne; Kithuruwan Vithanage	Mohammad Nabi (C); Afsar Zazai (wk); Asghar Stanikzai; Dawlat Zadran; Gulbadin Naib; Amir Hamza; Izatullah Dawlatzai; Karim Sadiq; Mirwais Ashraf; Mohammad Shahzad (wk); Najibullah Zadran; Nawroz Mangal; Samiullah Shenwari; Shafiqullah (wk); Shapoor Zadran; Hamid Hassan; Noor Ali Zadran

== T20I series ==
=== Pakistan vs Afghanistan: Only T20I ===
8 December 2013 (D/N)
Scorecard

Afghanistan; 137/8 (20 overs)	v	Pakistan; 138/4 (19.5 overs)
Najibullah Zadran 38 (30); Junaid Khan 3/24 (4 overs)		Mohammad Hafeez 42* (37); Mohammad Nabi 1/21 (4 overs)

Pakistan won by 6 wickets
Sharjah Cricket Association Stadium, Sharjah
Umpires: Ahsan Raza (Pak) and Shozab Raza (Pak)
Player of the match: Mohammad Hafeez (Pak)

- Afghanistan won the toss and elected to bat.
- Sharjeel Khan (Pakistan) made his T20I debut.

=== Pakistan vs Sri Lanka: 1st T20I ===
11 December 2013 (D/N)
Scorecard

Sri Lanka; 145/5 (20 overs)	v	Pakistan; 146/7 (19.1 overs)
Angelo Mathews 50 (34); Sohail Tanvir 2/34 (4 overs)		Shahid Afridi 39* (20); Lasith Malinga 3/26 (4 overs)

Pakistan won by 3 wickets
Dubai International Cricket Stadium, Dubai
Umpires: Ahsan Raza (Pak) and Shozab Raza (Pak)
Player of the match: Shahid Afridi (Pakistan)

- Pakistan won the toss and elected to field.
- Usman Khan (Pakistan) made his T20I debut.

=== Pakistan vs Sri Lanka: 2nd T20I ===
13 December 2013 (D/N)
Scorecard

Sri Lanka; 211/3 (20 overs)	v	Pakistan; 187 (19.2 overs)
Kusal Perera 84 (59); Saeed Ajmal 2/25 (4 overs)		Sharjeel Khan 50 (25); Sachithra Senanayake 3/27 (4 overs)

Sri Lanka won by 24 runs
Dubai International Cricket Stadium, Dubai
Umpires: Ahsan Raza (Pak) and Zameer Haider (Pak)
Player of the match: Kusal Perera (Sri Lanka)

- Pakistan won the toss and elected to field.
- Seekkuge Prasanna (Sri Lanka) made his T20I debut.

== ODI series ==
=== 1st ODI ===
18 December 2013 (D/N)
Scorecard

Pakistan; 322/5 (50 overs)	v	Sri Lanka; 311 (49.4 overs)
Mohammad Hafeez 122 (129); Suranga Lakmal 2/73 (10 overs)		Kusal Perera 64 (68); Junaid Khan 3/44 (5.4 overs)

Pakistan won by 11 runs
Sharjah Cricket Stadium, Sharjah
Umpires: Johan Cloete (RSA) and Shozab Raza (Pak)
Player of the match: Mohammad Hafeez (Pakistan)

- Pakistan won the toss and elected to bat.
- Sharjeel Khan (Pakistan) made his ODI debut.

=== 2nd ODI ===
20 December 2013 (D/N)
Scorecard

Pakistan; 284/4 (50 overs)	v	Sri Lanka; 287/8 (49.4 overs)
Ahmed Shehzad 124 (140); Seekkuge Prasanna 1/45 (10 overs)		Kumar Sangakkara 58 (67); Junaid Khan 3/52 (10 overs)

Sri Lanka won by 2 wickets
Dubai International Cricket Stadium, Dubai
Umpires: Ahsan Raza (Pak) and Richard Illingworth (Eng)
Player of the match: Angelo Mathews (Sri Lanka)

- Sri Lanka won the toss and elected to field.

=== 3rd ODI ===
22 December 2013 (D/N)
Scorecard

Pakistan; 326/5 (50 overs)	v	Sri Lanka; 213 (44.4 overs)
Mohammad Hafeez 140* (136); Thisara Perera 2/58 (8 overs)		Tillakaratne Dilshan 59 (62); Umar Gul 3/19 (5.4 overs)

Pakistan won by 113 runs
Sharjah Cricket Stadium, Sharjah
Umpires: Johan Cloete (Rsa) and Shozab Raza (Pak)
Player of the match: Mohammad Hafeez (Pak)

- Sri Lanka won the toss and elected to field.

=== 4th ODI ===
25 December 2013 (D/N)
Scorecard

Pakistan; 226/2 (41.1 overs)	v	Sri Lanka; 225 (48.5 overs)
Mohammad Hafeez 113* (119); Angelo Mathews 1/15 (6 overs)		Ashan Priyanjan 74 (93); Saeed Ajmal 4/39 (9.5 overs)

Pakistan won by 8 wickets
Sheikh Zayed Cricket Stadium, Abu Dhabi
Umpires: Ahsan Raza (Pak) and Richard Illingworth (Eng)
Player of the match: Mohammad Hafeez (Pak)

- Sri Lanka won the toss and elected to bat.
- Ashan Priyanjan and Kithuruwan Vithanage (Sri Lanka) made their ODI debut.

=== 5th ODI ===
27 December 2013 (D/N)
Scorecard

Pakistan; 232 (49.3 overs)	v	Sri Lanka; 235/8 (49.4 overs)
Misbah-ul-Haq 51 (74); Lasith Malinga 4/57 (10 overs)		Dinesh Chandimal 64* (70); Junaid Khan 3/31 (7.1 overs)

Sri Lanka won by 2 wickets
Sheikh Zayed Cricket Stadium, Abu Dhabi
Umpires: Johan Cloete (Rsa) and Shozab Raza (Pak)
Player of the match: Dinesh Chandimal (Sri Lanka)

- Pakistan won the toss and elected to bat.

== Test series ==
=== 1st Test ===
31 December 2013 – 4 January 2014
Scorecard

Sri Lanka	v	Pakistan
204 (65 overs); Angelo Mathews 91 (127); Junaid Khan 5/58 (20 overs)		383 (129.1 overs); Younus Khan 136 (298); Shaminda Eranga 3/80 (30 overs)
480/5d (168.3 overs); Angelo Mathews 157* (343); Junaid Khan 3/93 (36 overs)		158/2 (52 overs); Mohammad Hafeez 80* (136); Rangana Herath 1/37 (21 overs)

Match drawn
Sheikh Zayed Cricket Stadium, Abu Dhabi
Umpires: Richard Kettleborough (England) and Bruce Oxenford (Australia)
Player of the match: Angelo Mathews (SL)

- Pakistan won the toss and elected to field
- Ahmed Shehzad, Bilawal Bhatti (Pakistan) and Sachithra Senanayake (Sri Lanka) made their Test debuts.

=== 2nd Test ===
8–12 January 2014
Scorecard

Pakistan	v	Sri Lanka
165 (63.5 overs); Khurram Manzoor 73 (136); Rangana Herath 3/26 (10.5 overs)		388 (134 overs); Mahela Jayawardene 129 (278); Junaid Khan 3/102 (36 overs)
359 (137.3 overs); Misbah-ul-Haq 97 (248); Suranga Lakmal 4/78 (28.3 overs)		137/1 (46.2 overs); Dimuth Karunaratne 62* (125); Saeed Ajmal 1/45 (17.2 overs)

Sri Lanka won by 9 wickets
Dubai International Cricket Stadium, Dubai
Umpires: Bruce Oxenford (Aus) and S. Ravi (Ind)
Player of the match: Mahela Jayawardene (SL)

- Sri Lanka won the toss and elected to field.

=== 3rd Test ===
16–20 January 2014
Scorecard

Pakistan	v	Sri Lanka
341 (109.1 overs); Ahmed Shehzad 147 (275); Rangana Herath 5/125 (38.1 overs)		428/9d (172 overs); Dilruwan Perera 95 (247); Junaid Khan 3/81 (32 overs)
302/5 (57.3 overs); Azhar Ali 103 (137); Suranga Lakmal 3/79 (12 overs)		214 (101.4 overs); Prasanna Jayawardene 49 (88); Abdur Rehman 4/56 (33 overs)

Pakistan won by 5 wickets
Sharjah Cricket Stadium, Sharjah
Umpires: Richard Kettleborough (Eng) and S. Ravi (Ind)
Player of the match: Azhar Ali (Pak)

- Sri Lanka won the toss and elected to bat.
- Dilruwan Perera (Sri Lanka) made his Test debut.

== Statistics ==
Pakistan

- Bilawal Bhatti took his 1st Test wicket when he got Kaushal Silva out in the first innings of the 1st Test.
- Younus Khan made his 23rd Test century in the first innings of the 1st Test.
- Misbah-ul-Haq made his 5th Test century in the first innings of the 1st Test.
- Junaid Khan took his 50th Test wicket when he got Dinesh Chandimal out in the second innings of the 1st Test.
- Misbah-ul-Haq passed 3,000 Test runs in the second innings of the 2nd Test.
- Ahmed Shehzad made his 1st Test century in the first innings of the 3rd Test.
- Azhar Ali made his 5th Test century in the second innings of the 3rd Test.

Sri Lanka

- Angelo Mathews made his 2nd Test century in the second innings of the 1st Test.
- Angelo Mathews passed 2,000 Test runs in the second innings of the 1st Test.
- Mahela Jayawardene made his 32nd Test century in the first innings of the 2nd Test.
- Prasanna Jayawardene passed 2,000 Test runs in the first innings of the 3rd Test.
- Mahela Jayawardene passed 11,000 Test runs in the second innings of the 3rd Test.

== Broadcasting rights ==
TV broadcaster(s)	Country	Notes
PTV Sports	Pakistan	Official Broadcasters
GEO Super	Pakistan	
CSN	Sri Lanka	
Sony SIX	Bangladesh	
Sony SIX	India	
Sky Sport	New Zealand	
Fox Sports	Australia	
SuperSport	South Africa; Zimbabwe	
Zee Cinema	United Kingdom	
