= New Zealand cricket team against Pakistan in the UAE in 2014–15 =

International cricket tour

New Zealand cricket team against Pakistan in 2014–15
	Pakistan	New Zealand
- Dates: 11 November – 19 December 2014
Captains	Misbah-ul-Haq (Tests & ODIs); Shahid Afridi (T20Is)	Brendon McCullum (Tests); Kane Williamson (T20Is & ODIs)

Test series
- Result: 3-match series drawn 1–1
Most runs	Mohammad Hafeez (418)	Brendon McCullum (347)
Most wickets	Yasir Shah (15)	Mark Craig (13)
- Player of the series: Mohammad Hafeez (Pak)

One Day International series
- Results: New Zealand won the 5-match series 3–2
Most runs	Haris Sohail (235)	Kane Williamson (346)
Most wickets	Mohammad Irfan (9)	Matt Henry (13)
- Player of the series: Kane Williamson (NZ)

Twenty20 International series
- Results: 2-match series drawn 1–1
Most runs	Sarfraz Ahmed (77)	Luke Ronchi (64)
Most wickets	Kyle Mills; James Neesham (3)	Sohail Tanvir; Shahid Afridi (3)
- Player of the series: Luke Ronchi (NZ)

The New Zealand cricket team toured the United Arab Emirates from 11 November to 19 December 2014 to play Pakistan. The tour consisted of three Test matches, two Twenty20 Internationals and five One Day International matches. The Test and T20I series were both drawn 1–1 and New Zealand won the ODI series 3–2. While one of the three Tests was drawn, the two that yielded results did so with a big margin. Pakistan won the first Test by 248 runs, while New Zealand won the third by an innings and 80 runs.

== Squads ==
Tests		T20I		ODIs	
Pakistan	New Zealand	Pakistan	New Zealand	Pakistan	New Zealand
Misbah-ul-Haq (C); Ahmed Shehzad; Asad Shafiq; Azhar Ali; Ehsan Adil; Haris Sohail; Imran Khan; Mohammad Hafeez; Mohammad Talha; Rahat Ali; Sarfraz Ahmed (WK); Shan Masood; Taufeeq Umar; Yasir Shah; Younus Khan; Zulfiqar Babar	Brendon McCullum (C); Corey Anderson; Trent Boult; Doug Bracewell; Mark Craig; Tom Latham; James Neesham; Luke Ronchi (WK); Hamish Rutherford; Ish Sodhi; Tim Southee; Ross Taylor; Neil Wagner; BJ Watling (WK); Kane Williamson	Shahid Afridi (C); Sarfraz Ahmed (WK); Umar Akmal; Anwar Ali; Umar Gul; Mohammad Hafeez; Raza Hasan; Mohammad Irfan; Saad Nasim; Wahab Riaz; Ahmed Shehzad; Haris Sohail; Sohail Tanvir; Awais Zia	Kane Williamson (C); Corey Anderson; Dean Brownlie; Anton Devcich; Martin Guptill; Matt Henry; Tom Latham (WK); Mitchell McClenaghan; Nathan McCullum; Kyle Mills; Adam Milne; James Neesham; Luke Ronchi; Ross Taylor; Daniel Vettori	Misbah-ul-Haq (C); Shahid Afridi; Sarfraz Ahmed (WK); Umar Akmal; Zulfiqar Babar; Bilawal Bhatti; Umar Gul; Mohammad Hafeez; Mohammad Irfan; Nasir Jamshed; Younis Khan; Wahab Riaz; Asad Shafiq; Ahmed Shehzad; Haris Sohail; Sohail Tanvir	Kane Williamson (C); Corey Anderson; Dean Brownlie; Anton Devcich; Martin Guptill; Matt Henry; Tom Latham (WK); Mitchell McClenaghan; Nathan McCullum; Kyle Mills; Adam Milne; James Neesham; Luke Ronchi; Ross Taylor; Daniel Vettori

== Tour match ==
=== 3-Day Warm-up: Pakistan A vs New Zealanders ===
3–5 November 2014
Scorecard

Pakistan A	v	New Zealanders
215 (92.1 overs); Shan Masood 67 (173); Ish Sodhi 5/58 (21.1 overs)		244/8d (70 overs); Corey Anderson 80 (121); Anwar Ali 2/15 (8 overs)
153/3 (63 overs); Haris Sohail 40* (107); Mark Craig 1/22 (10 overs)

Match drawn
Sharjah Cricket Stadium
Umpires: Ahmed Shahab (Pak) & Shozab Raza (Pak)

- Pakistan A won the toss and chose to bat
- Players per side 15 (11 batting, 11 fielding)

== Test series ==
=== 1st Test ===
9–13 November 2014
Scorecard

Pakistan	v	New Zealand
566/3d (170.5 overs); Ahmed Shehzad 176 (371); Corey Anderson 2/68 (19 overs)		262 (87.3 overs); Tom Latham 103 (222); Rahat Ali 4/22 (17 overs)
175/2d (39.2 overs); Mohammad Hafeez 101* (130); Ish Sodhi 2/66 (13 overs)		231 (70.3 overs); Ish Sodhi 63 (102); Yasir Shah 3/74 (18 overs)

Pakistan won by 248 runs
Sheikh Zayed Cricket Stadium, Abu Dhabi
Umpires: Rod Tucker (Aus) and Ranmore Martinesz (SL)
Player of the match: Rahat Ali (Pak)

- Pakistan won the toss and elected to bat.

=== 2nd Test ===
17–21 November 2014
Scorecard

New Zealand	v	Pakistan
403 (156 overs); Tom Latham 137 (269); Zulfiqar Babar 4/137 (45 overs)		393 (147 overs); Sarfraz Ahmed 112 (195); Tim Southee 3/67 (30 overs)
250/9d (64.5 overs); Ross Taylor 104 (133); Yasir Shah 5/79 (21 overs)		196/5 (67 overs); Younus Khan 44 (84); Trent Boult 2/12 (10 overs)

Match Drawn
Dubai International Cricket Stadium
Umpires: Ranmore Martinesz (SL) and Paul Reiffel (Aus)
Player of the match: Ross Taylor (NZ)

- New Zealand won the toss and elected to bat.

=== 3rd Test ===
26 November - 1 December 2014
Scorecard

Pakistan	v	New Zealand
351 (125.4 overs); Mohammad Hafeez 197 (316); Mark Craig 7/94 (27.4 overs)		690 (143.1 overs); Brendon McCullum 202 (188); Rahat Ali 4/99 (44.1 overs)
259 (63.3 overs); Asad Shafiq 137 (148); Trent Boult 4/38 (15 overs)

New Zealand won by an innings and 80 runs
Sharjah Cricket Stadium
Umpires: Rod Tucker (Aus) and Paul Reiffel (Aus)
Player of the match: Mark Craig (NZ)

- Pakistan won the toss and elected to bat.
- Daniel Vettori became the most-capped New Zealander Test player.
- Play on day 2 was suspended after the death of Australian cricketer Phillip Hughes. The match was extended by a day, and 28 November was Day 2.
- Mark Craig's figures of 7/94 in the first innings are his best in Test cricket.

== T20I series ==
=== 1st T20I ===
4 December 2014
20:00 (D/N)
Scorecard

New Zealand; 135/7 (20 overs)	v	Pakistan; 140/3 (19.1 overs)
Corey Anderson 48 (37); Sohail Tanvir 2/24 (4 overs)		Sarfraz Ahmed 76* (64); Mitchell McClenaghan 1/21 (4 overs)

Pakistan won by 7 wickets
Dubai International Cricket Stadium
Umpires: Ahmed Shahab (Pak) and Ahsan Raza (Pak)
Player of the match: Sarfraz Ahmed (Pak)

- Pakistan won the toss and elected to field.
- Matt Henry (NZ) made his T20I debut.

=== 2nd T20I ===
5 December 2014
20:00 (D/N)
Scorecard

New Zealand; 144/8 (20 overs)	v	Pakistan; 127 (18.5 overs)
Kane Williamson 32 (31); Umar Gul 2/24 (4 overs)		Ahmed Shehzad 33 (36); James Neesham 3/25 (3 overs)

New Zealand won by 17 runs
Dubai International Cricket Stadium
Umpires: Aleem Dar (Pak) and Shozab Raza (Pak)
Player of the match: Anton Devcich (NZ)

- Pakistan won the toss and elected to field.

== ODI series ==
=== 1st ODI ===
8 December 2014
15:00 (D/N)
Scorecard

New Zealand; 246/7 (50 overs)	v	Pakistan; 250/7 (49.3 overs)
Ross Taylor 105* (135); Mohammad Irfan 3/57 (10 overs)		Haris Sohail 85* (109); Daniel Vettori 2/40 (10 overs)

Pakistan won by 3 wickets
Dubai International Cricket Stadium
Umpires: Aleem Dar (Pak) and Joel Wilson (WI)
Player of the match: Haris Sohail (Pak)

- Pakistan won the toss and elected to field.

=== 2nd ODI ===
12 December 2014
15:00 (D/N)
Scorecard

Pakistan; 252 (48.3 overs)	v	New Zealand; 255/6 (46 overs)
Mohammad Hafeez 76 (92); Matt Henry 4/45 (10 overs)		Kane Williamson 70* (91); Haris Sohail 3/48 (9 overs)

New Zealand won by 4 wickets
Sharjah Cricket Stadium
Umpires: Richard Illingworth (Eng) and Ahsan Raza (Pak)
Player of the match: Kane Williamson (NZ)

- Pakistan won the toss and elected to bat.

=== 3rd ODI ===
14 December 2014
15:00 (D/N)
Scorecard

Pakistan; 364/7 (50 overs)	v	New Zealand; 217 (38.2 overs)
Ahmed Shehzad 113 (120); Matt Henry 3/69 (9 overs)		Kane Williamson 46 (52); Shahid Afridi 3/37 (9.2 overs)

Pakistan won by 147 runs
Sharjah Cricket Stadium
Umpires: Shozab Raza (Pak) and Joel Wilson (WI)
Player of the match: Ahmed Shehzad (Pak)

- Pakistan won the toss and elected to bat.

=== 4th ODI ===
17 December 2014
15:00 (D/N)
Scorecard

New Zealand; 299/5 (50 overs)	v	Pakistan; 292/8 (50 overs)
Kane Williamson 123 (105); Mohammad Irfan 2/53 (10 overs)		Younis Khan 103 (117); Daniel Vettori 3/53 (10 overs)

New Zealand won by 7 runs
Sheikh Zayed Cricket Stadium, Abu Dhabi
Umpires: Richard Illingworth (Eng) and Shozab Raza (Pak)
Player of the match: Kane Williamson (NZ)

- New Zealand won the toss and elected to bat.

=== 5th ODI ===
19 December 2014
15:00 (D/N)
Scorecard

New Zealand; 275/4 (50 overs)	v	Pakistan; 207 (43.3 overs)
Kane Williamson 97 (116); Mohammad Irfan 2/62 (10 overs)		Haris Sohail 65 (74); Matt Henry 5/30 (9 overs)

New Zealand won by 68 runs
Sheikh Zayed Cricket Stadium, Abu Dhabi
Umpires: Ahsan Raza (Pak) and Joel Wilson (WI)
Player of the match: Matt Henry (NZ)

- New Zealand won the toss and elected to bat.
