= Mohammad Hafeez =

Pakistani cricketer (born 1980)

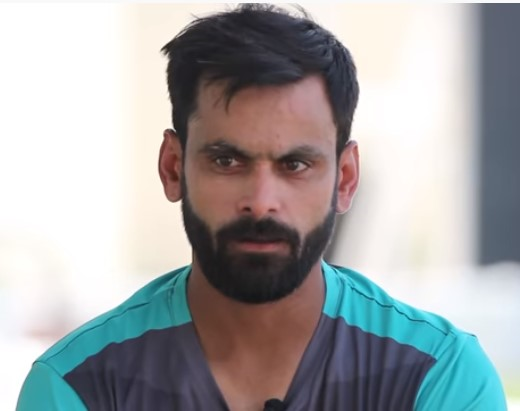
- Mohammad Hafeez in 2017

Personal information
- Born: 17 October 1980 (age 46); Sargodha, Punjab, Pakistan
- Nickname: Chanda, Professor
- Height: 174 cm (5 ft 9 in)
- Batting: Right-handed
- Bowling: Right-arm off break
- Role: Batting all-rounder

International information
- National side: Pakistan (2003–2021)
- Test debut (cap 173): 20 August 2003 v Bangladesh
- Last Test: 3 December 2018 v New Zealand
- ODI debut (cap 144): 3 April 2003 v Zimbabwe
- Last ODI: 5 July 2019 v Bangladesh
- ODI shirt no.: 8 (formerly 88)
- T20I debut (cap 5): 1 September 2006 v England
- Last T20I: 11 November 2021 v Australia
- T20I shirt no.: 8

Domestic team information
- Years: Team
- 2005–2011/12: Faisalabad Wolves
- 2008: Kolkata Knight Riders
- 2012/13–2015/16: Lahore Lions
- 2016–2018: Peshawar Zalmi
- 2017: St Kitts and Nevis Patriots
- 2019: Rajshahi Kings
- 2019–2022: Lahore Qalandars
- 2019: Edmonton Royals
- 2019: Middlesex
- 2019/20: Southern Punjab
- 2020/21: Khyber Pakhtunkhwa
- 2021: Galle Gladiators
- 2021: Muzaffarabad Tigers
- 2022: Mohammedan Sporting Club cricket team
- 2023: Quetta Gladiators

Career statistics
Competition	Test	ODI	T20I	FC
Matches	55	218	119	210
Runs scored	3,652	6,614	2,514	12,169
Batting average	37.64	32.90	26.46	34.76
100s/50s	10/12	11/38	0/14	26/56
Top score	224	140*	99*	224
Balls bowled	4,067	7,733	1,261	14,992
Wickets	53	139	61	253
Bowling average	34.11	38.84	22.75	26.73
5 wickets in innings	0	0	0	7
10 wickets in match	0	0	0	2
Best bowling	4/16	4/41	4/10	8/57
Catches/stumpings	45/–	82/–	30/-	183/–
Medal record
Men's Cricket
Representing Pakistan
T20 World Cup
Runner-up	2007 South Africa
Champions Trophy
Winner	2017 England & Wales
Asia Cup
Winner	2012 Bangladesh
Runner-up	2014 Bangladesh
- Source: ESPNcricinfo, 4 January 2022

Mohammad Hafeez (Punjabi and Urdu: محمد حفیظ; born 17 October 1980) is a Pakistani cricket coach and former cricketer. He was a member of the Pakistan team that won the 2017 ICC Champions Trophy, and had a major role in the final, where he scored an unbeaten half century. He retired from Test cricket after the third and final match against New Zealand in Abu Dhabi in December 2018, departing the ground for the final time in white clothing to a guard of honour from his teammates. On 3 January 2022, he announced his retirement from all forms of international cricket, ending a career that spanned more than 18 years.

He was the fourth international player to play in the Caribbean Premier League and the first Pakistani player to be chosen for Twenty20 tournament. He is nicknamed "The Professor". The major teams for which he played are Pakistan, Lahore, Lahore Lions, Guyana Amazon Warriors, Kolkata Knight Riders, Sargodha, Sui Gas Corporation of Pakistan. Hafeez scored his test career best of 224 runs against Bangladesh in 2015 at Khulna during the Dan Cake Series.

In August 2018, he was one of the thirty-three players to be awarded a central contract for the 2018–19 season by the Pakistan Cricket Board (PCB). In December 2018, during Pakistan's series against New Zealand, Hafeez announced that he would retire from Test cricket following the conclusion of the tour, to focus on limited-overs cricket. Hafeez said that the time was right to retire from Test cricket and that he was honoured to represent Pakistan in 55 Test matches, including captaining the team.

After a lackluster personal ICC 2019 World Cup campaign albeit a match-winning 84 batting at number 4 against England in the round-robin stage in 2019, he found new life as a T20 specialist for Pakistan and various leagues across the world. This culminated in him being the leading run scorer in T20I cricket in the world in 2020.

== Domestic career ==
Hafeez made his first-class debut in February 1999 for Sargodha against Karachi, opening the innings (13 and 6). He struck his maiden first-class century in September 2001, 112 off 121 for SNGPL versus Khan Research Laboratories at Rawalpindi.

In the President's Trophy at Rawalpindi (10 November 2012), Hafeez produced a dominant all-round display for SNGPL against United Bank Limited, taking 4 for 13 as UBL were dismissed for 165, then top-scoring with 193 off 301 balls (32 fours) in SNGPL's 455/5 dec. UBL folded for 74 in the second innings to give SNGPL victory by an innings and 216 runs.

== International career ==
=== Early years: 2003–2006 ===
Hafeez was one of several young all-rounders whom the Pakistani cricket team turned to in order to revitalize their team after their poor display in 2003 World Cup where Pakistan was out from first round. He entered international cricket with his ODI debut against Zimbabwe at Sharjah in April 2003, and his Test debut followed in August 2003 against Bangladesh at Karachi, where he made 51 off 151 in a seven-wicket win.

In these early months of 2003, Hafeez had scored a half-century in only his second ODI innings and, in the Cherry Blossom Cup at Sharjah, took five wickets at 17.00 with an economy of 3.54. However, his form with both bat and ball was inconsistent and in late 2003 he was dropped from the Test squad and subsequently from the ODI team.

Following strong domestic performances, as well as some consistent showings for the Pakistan A team, he remained on the fringes of a recall in 2004. In the meantime he played a few matches as the professional at Settle Cricket Club, Yorkshire, in 2005. Hafeez returned to the ODI team in 2005 and despite poor form with the bat, his bowling performances were impressive. In the 2006 series held in Australia, Hafeez smashed his first century for Pakistan. With Pakistan struggling to find a solid opening pair for the Test team, he was recalled for the tour of England. His return to Test cricket was made at The Oval where he scored a fluent 95. He got used to English conditions after playing two seasons of Yorkshire League cricket in 2002 and 2005.

Subsequently, Hafeez retained his place in the Test squad for Pakistan's home series against the West Indies in November of that year. After getting out early despite good starts in the first two Tests, he went on to score his second Test century in the third Test in Karachi.

In 2010, in a widely noted practice match, Pakistan A, captained by Hafeez, defeated the senior Pakistan team, prompting scrutiny of preparation and standards ahead of the upcoming international assignment.

=== Recall in 2010 ===
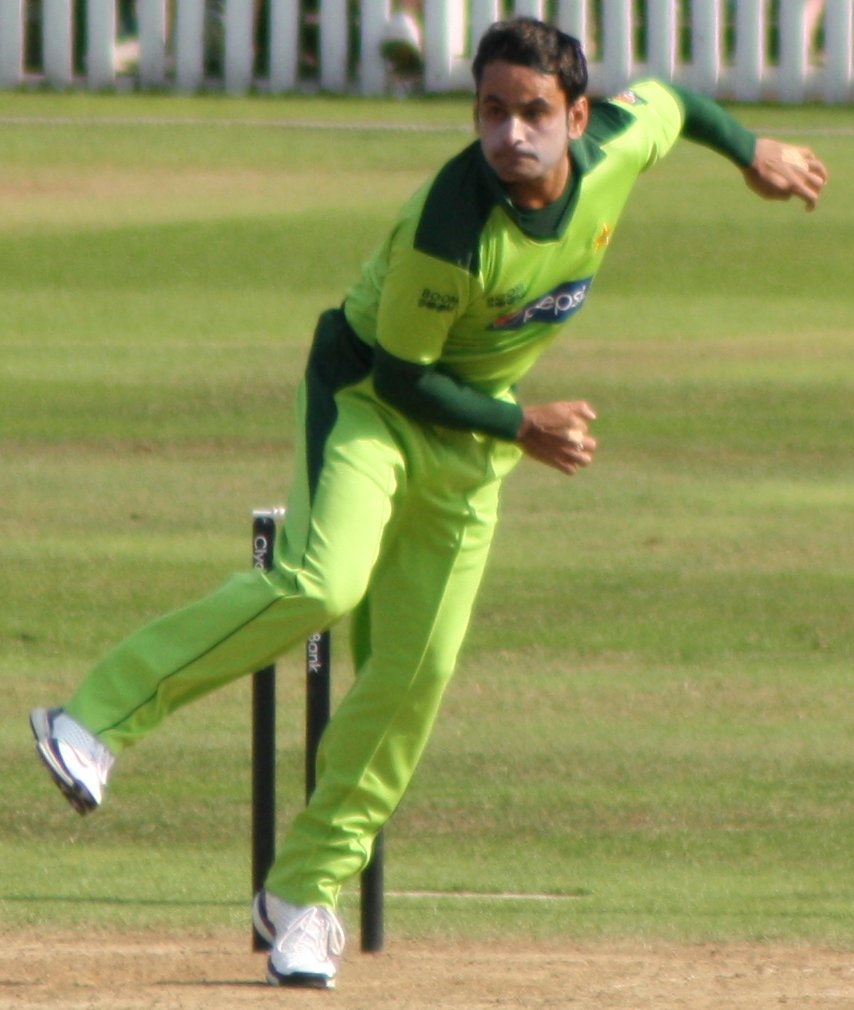
Mohammad Hafeez bowling during a 50-over warm-up match against Somerset at the County Ground, Taunton, during Pakistan's 2010 tour of England.

In 2010 he was recalled for the third ICC World Twenty20 squad. His form was poor scoring only 39 runs and taking only 2 wickets in 6 matches. However he was subsequently selected for the T20Is and the ODIs on Pakistan's 2010 tour of England. He was the second highest Pakistani run scorer in the ODI series producing some solid opening partnerships with Kamran Akmal. Following this good form he was included in the squad that was selected to play South Africa in the UAE and he replaced disgraced skipper Salman Butt as an opening batsman in both Tests, achieving a batting average 32.50. He played in all 5 ODI matches ending up as the top run scorer and he also topped the bowling averages for the series.

At the end of 2010 he was also selected for the party that would tour New Zealand and the West Indies and this resulted in him establishing himself as a regular in the Test, ODI and T20 teams. During the third ODI of the New Zealand tour, Hafeez struck his maiden ODI century, anchoring Pakistan's innings after early losses and then accelerating to set a platform for a late surge; Pakistan posted a winning total and defeated New Zealand by 43 runs to level the series 1–1. Hafeez's innings combined counter-attack with control on a slow, low surface where New Zealand's seamers failed to sustain pressure.

Since his recall, Hafeez had averaged nearly 33 in 19 ODIs, with one century (in New Zealand) and three fifties, while also contributing 13 wickets and providing a reliable fielding presence; his most productive stand in that period had come with Kamran Akmal, who had moved to No. 3. Analysing Pakistan's ODI output after his 2010 recall, in 2011 Cricinfo's S Rajesh described Hafeez's “second coming”: as an opener he averaged ~35 in 26 ODIs with six 50-plus scores and a maiden century at Christchurch, an improvement of ~88% on his pre-2010 ODI average. With the ball he delivered about seven overs per match at 4.24 econ, regularly chipping in wickets, and collected three Man-of-the-Match awards in 2011 (five overall). In that span, no Pakistan batter scored more ODI runs, Shahid Afridi matched the aggregate but in eight more games, while Hafeez's partnership with Kamran Akmal averaged 60.70 (six 50+ stands in 11 innings). The piece also contrasted his strong domestic T20 returns (377 runs at 47.12, SR 144.44 since 2009) with a relatively modest T20I record to that point (avg 17, SR 108, HS 46).

=== Rising through ranks ===
After scoring a Man-of-the-Match 83 in the third ODI against Sri Lanka at Dubai on 19 November 2011, Mohammad Hafeez said the innings reflected sustained work on his game since returning to the top of the order. The knock extended his productive run as opener and, combined with his offspin and fielding, underlined his value to Pakistan's balance.

In the only T20I at Mirpur on 29 November 2011, Hafeez was Player of the Match, contributing 25 off 31 balls as Pakistan reached 135/7, and then returning 2 for 11 with his offspin to help restrict Bangladesh to 85/9, sealing a 50-run victory. During Pakistan's clean-sweep ODI series win in Bangladesh, Hafeez became only the third cricketer to complete the calendar-year double of 1,000 ODI runs and 30 wickets, a feat previously achieved by Sanath Jayasuriya (1997) and Jacques Kallis (2000 and 2002).

Against India on 18 March 2012 in Bangladesh at Shere Bangla National Stadium, Mirpur at the 2012 Asia Cup, he scored 105 off 113 balls and was involved in a 224 run partnership with Nasir Jamshed, which is the best opening partnership for Pakistan against India in one day internationals. They eclipsed Aamer Sohail and Saeed Anwar's record of 144 runs which was made in 1996. During this innings, Hafeez was forced to run a lot which towards the end was hampering him due to a leg injury. Subsequently, he earned the nickname, the Snake of Sargodha, for his zigzag running pattern between the wickets. He made his 4th ODI century in March 2012 against Bangladesh at Dhaka. He also made his highest test score of 196 against Sri Lanka in the second Test at Colombo in June 2012.

In December 2012, during the tour of Pakistani cricket team in India in 2012–13, he came across as a very different and aggressive batsman and scored so brilliantly and briskly and helped Pakistan to win the first T20I and 2nd ODI with his heroics of brilliant batting and nearly chasing a mountain high target of 191 in the second T20I. His scores were 61 and 55 in first and second T20I respectively and scored 76 runs in the 2nd ODI and sharing an opening stand of 141 with Nasir Jamshed and also bowled economically to help Pakistan win their first ODI series in India since 7 years. In this period, he was considered to be the main all-rounder of Pakistan team along with Shahid Afridi.

In January 2013, it had been noted that since the start of 2011, Hafeez's returns in all formats outstripped his career aggregates: in ODIs his batting average climbed into the mid-30s with four centuries, while with the ball he was markedly more economical at 3.56 runs per over. In Tests over the period he averaged 40+ (including a highest of 196 versus Sri Lanka in June 2012), and in T20Is all four of his half-centuries arrived in this stretch. The standout figure was his ODI economy: across 52 matches the average economy of all bowlers was 4.59, against which Hafeez's 3.56 was 22% better, the best among bowlers to deliver 150+ overs. His value included new-ball overs inside the first 15: 678 balls, 14 wickets, economy 3.11, and only 29 boundaries conceded (one every 23 balls). In T20Is too, his economy over the previous two years was a leading 5.87 (minimum 40 overs), versus 6.86 overall in his 21 games. With the bat he topped Pakistan's runs in both ODIs and T20Is during the window and amassed 3000+ international runs across formats. He also collected 13 Man-of-the-Match awards in the span (seven ODIs, five T20Is, one Test) more than any other international player.

He had a great series against Sri Lanka in Dec 2013, where he scored 122 in the first match, 140* in the third and 113* in the fourth match. Thus he became, the second batsman after Zaheer Abbas to score 3 centuries in an ODI series. He was also noted for his contributions with his offspin bowling.

In the Sharjah Test against New Zealand (26–30 November 2014), Hafeez returned from England, where his bowling action had been tested, and immediately struck 178 not out, his seventh Test century, to give Pakistan a strong opening platform. Although New Zealand ultimately won by an innings and 80 runs, Hafeez finished the series as Player of the Series with 418 runs and four wickets.

For his performances in 2014, he was named in the World ODI XI by ICC. He was also named in the T20I XI by ESPNcricinfo for his performances in 2013.

On 8 February 2015, Mohammad Hafeez was ruled out of the 2015 Cricket World Cup with a calf injury, and was replaced by Nasir Jamshed.

Reflecting on Pakistan's 2015 home-away Test series against England in the UAE, Mohammad Hafeez said the sustained swing and discipline of James Anderson and Stuart Broad was among the most challenging bowling he had faced, and that he had to tighten his technique, playing later and closer to the body, to succeed. The adjustments underpinned a prolific series for Hafeez, including a big first-Test hundred at Abu Dhabi, and emblematised his reputation as a methodical top-order batter nicknamed “the Professor.” Pakistan won the series 2-0 (3) and Hafeez got the most runs, 380, including a score of 151.

In the final of the 2017 ICC Champions Trophy, coming down the order he hit a quickfire 57* off 37 deliveries, including three sixes and four fours.

On 4 December 2018, Hafeez announced he would retire from Test cricket after the ongoing Abu Dhabi match against New Zealand, telling selectors he wished to concentrate on his limited-overs career.

In the first ODI at Port Elizabeth on 19 January 2019, Hafeez guided Pakistan to a five-wicket win over South Africa with an unbeaten 71 off 63 balls, steadying a late wobble in the chase of 267 and earning Player of the Match.

In one of the opening matches of the 2019 Cricket World Cup, against England, Hafeez top scored with 84 off 62 deliveries, including eight fours and two sixes, helping Pakistan set a record target in World Cups of 348. He later took the important wicket of in-form Eoin Morgan. For his all-round performance he was declared Player of the Match.

== T20 captaincy record ==
Hafeez's record as T20I captain
Format	Matches	Won	Lost	Drawn	No result	Win (%)
T20I	29	17	11	–	–	60.34

=== Captaincy ===
He was appointed captain of the Pakistan T20 team in May 2012 and vice captain, under Misbah-ul-Haq, of the ODI and Test teams. During the 2012 ICC World Twenty20 in Sri Lanka in September 2012, Pakistan reached the semi-finals where they lost to the home team. After the tournament, there was some controversy with veteran all-rounder Abdul Razzaq who was critical of his non-selection for a number of matches. Hafeez also came into some conflict with the PCB over their view that he adopted a rather unilateral and non-consultative approach while making selection decisions. However, he was supported by the coach Dav Whatmore and both of them emphasised the poor fitness levels of many players. The PCB committee decided that they would subsequently closely monitor Hafeez's performance in this context during the coming tours to India and South Africa.

As a captain, he led Pakistan to victories over South Africa, West Indies and Zimbabwe: in the 2nd T20I at Centurion on 3 March 2013, Hafeez set up Pakistan's victory against South Africa with a commanding captain's innings at the top of the order (career-best at the time), propelling a well-above-par total before Umar Gul’s five-wicket burst routed South Africa in reply. The emphatic win completed a turnaround on tour and lifted Pakistan three places to No. 3 in the ICC T20I rankings. For his all-round contributions, 86 (51) and 3/25, Hafeez was made Player of the Match.

He equalled the records of most wins as a Pakistani captain in T20 and most number of away series wins as a Pakistani captain. Under his leadership, Pakistan managed to move up to the second position in the rankings.

He also became the first Pakistani captain to hit three fifties in a row and became Pakistan's leading run scorer in T20s. After Pakistan's exit from the T20 World Championship Hafeez apologized on behalf of his team and stepped down as captain. Imran Khan, Pakistan's former captain criticised this decision and advised Hafeez to stay as captain. His resignation was a rare incident in Pakistan cricket.

=== Post-captaincy (2016–2021) ===
In March 2016, Pakistan's exit from the 2016 ICC World Twenty20 after losing 3 matches caused great controversy in Pakistan, with blame shifting between Waqar Younis as well as many of the players on the team. Hafeez was accused, by Younis, of lying about his knee injury before the T20. He said it could have affected the team's poor performance. Despite bad performance during the T20I world cup 2016 Hafeez was picked for the England tour of 2016 Hafeez was out on 0 several times throughout the test series and during the ODI series in the first match he was out on 11 which then he was dropped for rest of the tour because of bad performance and not fit enough to play. After missing out of international cricket for months in which he missed the West Indies series in the UAE, Hafeez was then picked for the Australia tour 2017 to play the ODI series. As of the first ODI match Hafeez was out on 4. For the second ODI Azhar Ali was ruled out because of injury which promoted Hafeez to captain Pakistan, Hafeez did a very good job as Pakistan won the match and won for the first time in 12 years on Australian soil. Not only that Hafeez's captaincy was appreciated but he also made 72 runs which earned him player of the match. Hafeez was a regular member in Pakistan's triumph in the Champions Trophy 2017 in England

In April 2019, he was named in Pakistan's squad for the 2019 Cricket World Cup. Though, he was named man of the match in Pakistan's second match of the tournament against England for his 62-ball 84 and important wicket of English captain Eoin Morgan, he remained inconsistent for the rest of the tournament with low-strike rate scores of 16, 9, 20, 32, 19 and 27. He didn't do wonders with the ball either with an expensive economy rate of almost 6 per over which was worse than any other Pakistani spinner in the tournament.

After returning to Pakistan's T20I team at age 39 with an unbeaten 67 off 49 balls against Bangladesh in Lahore (26 January 2020), Hafeez said longevity at international level depends on match-winning contributions, adding that his goal was to justify selection through decisive batting and, where required, utility offspin.

In June 2020, he was named in a 29-man squad for Pakistan's tour to England during the COVID-19 pandemic. However, on 23 June 2020, Hafeez was one of seven players from Pakistan's squad to test positive for COVID-19. Hafeez then tested negative the following day, after taking a private test to get a second opinion. On 30 August 2020, in the second T20I against England, Hafeez became the second batsman for Pakistan to score 2,000 runs in T20I cricket. On 20 December 2020, he hit his career best T20I score of 99* off 57 balls against New Zealand in their second T20I at Hamilton.

A 2020 feature profiled Hafeez's late-career surge in T20 cricket, noting that at age 39–40 he produced career-best returns for Pakistan, including series-defining knocks in England and a 99 at Napier* in December. The piece highlighted adjustments in tempo and range, greater boundary options square and over extra cover, plus smarter matchup batting, which together made him one of the format's most productive run-scorers of the year.

On 10 April 2021, in the first match against South Africa, Hafeez played in his 100th T20I match.

On 31 July 2021, in the 2nd T20I at Providence, Guyana, Hafeez delivered a match-defining spell of 4–1–6–1, strangling the West Indies chase of 158 and earning Player of the Match as Pakistan won by seven runs (157/8 v 150/4). His 4 overs for 6 runs included 19 dot balls as well a maiden over, his economy rate of 1.50 runs an over was a record low for a player from a Full Member country.

In September 2021, he was named in Pakistan's squad for the 2021 ICC Men's T20 World Cup.

== T20 franchise career ==
=== IPL career ===
Mohammad Hafeez was signed by Kolkata Knight Riders, and played in the inaugural season of the IPL. He scored 64 runs in 8 matches and picked up 1 wicket in the tournament. He did not play in the 2nd edition of IPL due to the tense atmosphere after the 2008 Mumbai attacks.

=== PSL career ===
Hafeez was placed in the Diamond category in the inaugural edition of PSL and was acquired for US$70,000 by the Peshawar Zalmi team. He left Peshawar Zalmi in 2018 after playing for the franchise for 3 years. He was picked by Lahore Qalanders for the fourth edition of PSL and was also given the captaincy.

=== BPL career ===
In December 2015, he was signed by Dhaka Dynamites for the remainder of the 2015 Bangladesh Premier League (BPL). In December 2018, Hafeez joined Rajshahi Kings for the sixth edition of Bangladesh Premier League.

=== Other leagues ===
As captain of the Lahore Lions, Hafeez led the team to the Faysal Bank T20 Cup title in December 2012. Handed the captaincy by Mohammad Yousuf on the eve of the tournament, Hafeez praised a collective team effort after the win and said he had no point to prove regarding his credentials as Pakistan's T20 captain.

Mohammad Hafeez played for Wayamba United in 2012 Sri Lanka Premier League.

In January 2014, he was signed by Melbourne Stars as a replacement Lasith Malinga for the remainder of the 2013–14 BBL.

On 3 June 2018, he was selected to play for the Montreal Tigers in the players' draft for the inaugural edition of the Global T20 Canada tournament. In September 2018, he was named in Nangarhar's squad for the first edition of the Afghanistan Premier League tournament.

He was signed by Edmonton Royals as marquee player in 2nd season of GT20 Canada in July 2019. He replaced Rassie Van Dussen at the St Kitts and Nevis Patriors for CPL 2019. He then, signed for Middlesex for 5 matches in August 2019. He joined Middlesex County Cricket Club for the 2019 Vitality Blast, as a replacement for Mujeeb Ur Rahman.

In November 2021, he was selected to play for the Galle Gladiators following the players' draft for the 2021 Lanka Premier League. The same month, he joined Delhi Bulls for the fifth season of the Abu Dhabi T10 league.

== Playing style ==
Hafeez was a batting all-rounder, primarily an opening batsman who bowled offspin, and in the early 2010s he had evolved into one of the best all-rounders in the shorter formats: by January 2013, Hafeez had risen to No. 1 in the ICC ODI all-rounder rankings, No. 2 among ODI bowlers, and No. 2 among T20I all-rounders, while also forming one of the most productive ODI opening partnerships of the preceding year.

=== Batting ===
Hafeez was a right-hand opening batter noted for a compact base, timing-led strokeplay, and a full range square of the wicket and through the covers. He tended to build with risk control, using the leave and soft hands early, before expanding to lofts over extra cover and midwicket, and played spin with sweeps and quick feet rather than slogging.

=== Bowling ===
With the ball he was a right-arm off-spinner who bowled on a tight line with a relatively flat trajectory, mixing a skidder/arm-ball with the occasional slower, higher-revving off-break. Captains used him as a match-up option, particularly to left-handers, in the powerplay or to brake scoring in the middle overs due to his economy and accuracy.

A December 2011 statistical review of ODI trends identified a “spin-first” shift and singled out Hafeez as emblematic of the change for Pakistan: an off-spinner trusted to bowl inside the powerplay, especially to left-handers, maintaining tight economy while prising out top-order wickets. The piece located Hafeez alongside specialists like Saeed Ajmal in Pakistan's spin-led strategy, noting how his control and match-ups made him a reliable new-ball and middle-overs option in addition to his work as an opener.

==== Bowling action ====
In January 2005, Hafeez was reported for a suspected illegal bowling action following Pakistan's VB Series match against West Indies in Brisbane. The match officials referred the matter to the ICC under the reporting protocol, with Pakistan informed that his action would be reviewed under the governing procedures.

Amid scrutiny of his bowling action in late 2014, Hafeez said he was confident of clearing testing and emphasized that he had “never rated” his bowling as highly as his batting, viewing himself primarily as a top-order batter who offered offspin as a secondary skill. He added that any remedial work would not distract from his batting focus.

In June 2015, Hafeez was suspended for an illegal arm action. However, he was again selected for the ODI series against Sri Lanka. He proved the value of his comeback by taking 4 for 41 runs and scored a century, which earned him the man of the match award.

In November 2017, ICC suspended Hafeez again for illegal bowling action.

In December 2019, ECB banned Hafeez from bowling in the T20 Blast because of his action.

On 12 February 2020, Hafeez was cleared to bowl in international cricket after his action passed an ICC assessment, a ruling that arrived just ahead of the Pakistan Super League season.

== Post-retirement ==
=== Higher education ===
Having to disrupt his studies because of his professional cricket career, in 2023 he resumed them at the age of 42 by enrolling in the University of Karachi's BS Health Physical Education and Sports Sciences (HPESS) program.

=== Commentary career ===
Hafeez joined the commentary panel for the Peshawar-Quetta exhibition match ahead of the 2023 PSL.

=== Administration and coaching career ===
In November 2023, Mohammad Hafeez was appointed as the Pakistan national men team director and also as its interim head coach for the Australia and New Zealand tours, but due to the team's bad results his stint eventually ended in February 2024.

== Records and achievements ==
- Calendar-year double (2011): only the third player to score 1,000 ODI runs and take 30 ODI wickets in the same year (after Sanath Jayasuriya in 1997 and Jacques Kallis in 2000 & 2002).
- Best ODI economy among heavy-workload bowlers (2011–12 window): conceded 3.56 rpo (≈22% better than the game average 4.59) and was the most-used spinner in the first 15 overs (678 balls, 14 wkts @ 3.11, only 29 boundaries conceded).
- Most international Man-of-the-Match awards in 2011–12: 13 (7 ODIs, 5 T20Is, 1 Test), the most by any player over that period. He also led Pakistan's runs in ODIs and T20Is and crossed 3000 international runs across formats in those two years.
- ICC No. 1 ODI all-rounder (Jan 2013) – also ranked No. 2 ODI bowler and No. 2 T20I all-rounder at the same time.
- Three hundreds in one bilateral ODI series (v Sri Lanka, Dec 2013): only the second Pakistan batter after Zaheer Abbas to do so; sealed a 3–1 series win.

=== International centuries ===
Hafeez has scored 21 international centuries, 10 in Test matches and 11 in ODIs.

He scored his maiden Test century in his second match on 27 August 2003 against Bangladesh. His highest Test score is 224 which was also scored against Bangladesh on 28 April 2015 at Khulna.

Test centuries
No.	Runs	Match	Against	City/Country	Venue	Start date	Result	Ref.
1	102*	2	Bangladesh	Peshawar, Pakistan	Arbab Niaz Stadium	27 August 2003	Won	
2	104	7	West Indies	Karachi, Pakistan	National Stadium	27 November 2006	Won	
3	119	18	Zimbabwe	Bulawayo, Pakistan	Queens Sports Club	1 September 2011	Won	
4	143	22	Bangladesh	Chittagong, Bangladesh	Zohur Ahmed Chowdhury Stadium	9 December 2011	Won	
5	196	27	Sri Lanka	Colombo, Sri Lanka	Sinhalese Sports Club Ground	30 June 2012	Drawn	
6	101*	39	New Zealand	Abu Dhabi, UAE	Sheikh Zayed Stadium	9 November 2014	Won	
7	197	40	New Zealand	Sharjah, UAE	Sharjah Cricket Association Stadium	26 November 2014	Lost	
8	224	41	Bangladesh	Khulna, Bangladesh	Sheikh Abu Naser Stadium	28 April 2015	Drawn	
9	151	47	England	Sharjah, UAE	Sharjah Cricket Association Stadium	1 November 2015	Won	
10	126	51	Australia	Dubai, UAE	Dubai International Cricket Stadium	7 October 2018	Drawn	

In ODIs, his maiden century came against New Zealand on 29 January 2011 at Christchurch. He scored 115 runs in that match and guided Pakistan to the victory. His highest ODI score is 140 not out which was scored against Sri Lanka in December 2013 at Sharjah.

One Day International centuries
No.	Runs	Match	Against	City/Country	Venue	Date	Result	Ref.
1	115	61	New Zealand	Christchurch, New Zealand	AMI Stadium	29 January 2011	Won	
2	121	76	West Indies	Bridgetown, Barbados	Kensington Oval	2 May 2011	Lost	
3	139*	81	Zimbabwe	Harare, Pakistan	Harare Sports Club	11 September 2011	Won	
4	105	98	India	Dhaka, Bangladesh	Sher-e-Bangla National Cricket Stadium	18 March 2012	Lost	
5	122*	117	Ireland	Dublin, Ireland	Clontarf Cricket Club Ground	23 May 2013	Tied	
6	136*	123	Zimbabwe	Harare, Zimbabwe	Harare Sports Club	29 August 2013	Won	
7	122	137	Sri Lanka	Sharjah, UAE	Sharjah Cricket Association Stadium	18 December 2013	Won	
8	140*	139	Sri Lanka	Sharjah, UAE	Sharjah Cricket Association Stadium	22 December 2013	Won	
9	113*	140	Sri Lanka	Abu Dhabi, UAE	Sheikh Zayed Cricket Stadium	25 December 2013	Won	
10	103	162	Sri Lanka	Dambulla, Sri Lanka	Rangiri Dambulla International Stadium	11 July 2015	Won	
11	102*	170	England	Abu Dhabi, UAE	Sheikh Zayed Cricket Stadium	11 November 2015	Won	

Preceded by Misbah-ul-Haq	Pakistani national cricket captain (T20I); 2012–2014	Succeeded by Shahid Afridi
