= Bothma =

Bothma is a surname. Notable people with the surname include:

- Johannes Bothma (born 1988), South African cricketer
- Michiel Bothma (born 1973), South African golfer
- Myrtle Bothma (born 1964), South African hurdler
- Renaldo Bothma (born 1989), South African-born Namibian rugby union footballer
