= John Smeaton (umpire) =

Australian cricket umpire (born 1948)

Personal information
- Full name: John Henry Smeaton
- Born: 31 August 1948 (age 78); Melbourne, Australia

Umpiring information
- Tests umpired: 1 (2001)
- Source: Cricinfo, 28 August 2014

John Henry Smeaton (born 31 August 1948) is a former Australian cricket umpire. He stood in one Test match in 2001.

Smeaton umpired 42 first-class matches between 1996 and 2004, most of them in Hobart. He umpired the last three days of the Test match between Australia and New Zealand in Hobart in November 2001, replacing Steve Davis during the match after Davis suffered a knee injury. Rain limited play on the three days to 105.2 overs, and the match was drawn.

== See also ==
- List of Test cricket umpires
