= Imran Farhat =

Pakistani cricketer

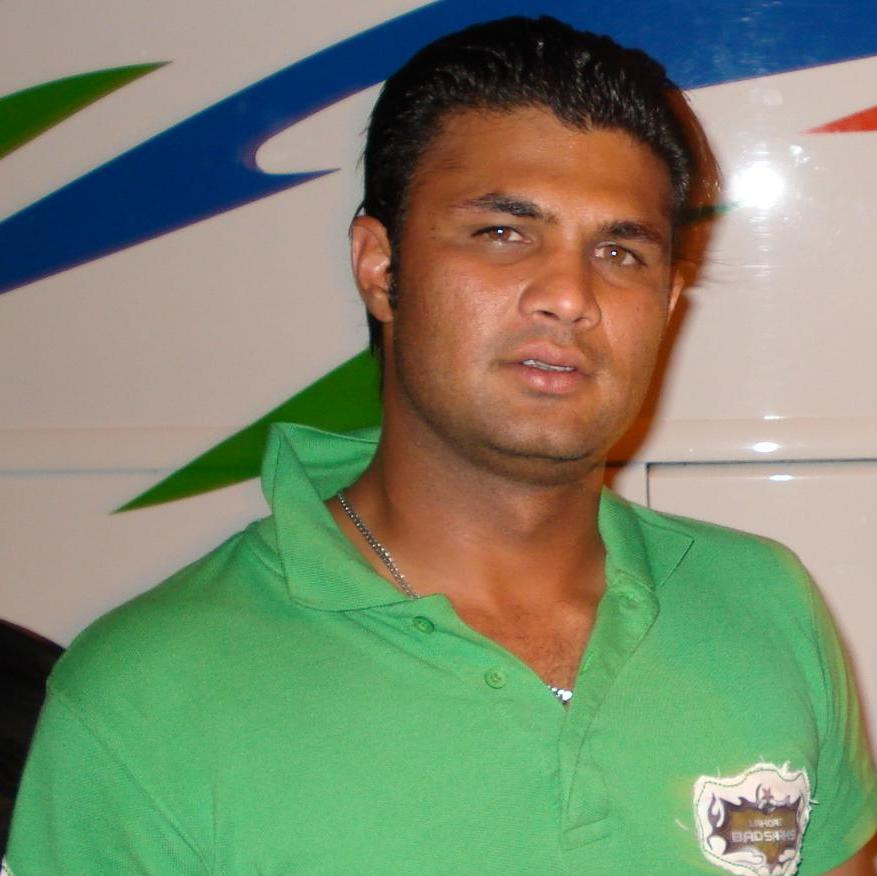
- Imran Farhat in 2008

Personal information
- Full name: Imran Farhat
- Born: 20 May 1982 (age 44); Lahore, Punjab, Pakistan
- Nickname: Romi
- Height: 5 ft 7 in (170 cm)
- Batting: Left-handed
- Bowling: Leg break
- Role: Opening Batsman
- Relatives: Mohammad Ilyas (father-in-law); Humayun Farhat (brother)

International information
- National side: Pakistan (2001–2013)
- Test debut (cap 165): 8 March 2001 v New Zealand
- Last Test: 22 February 2013 v South Africa
- ODI debut (cap 135): 17 February 2001 v New Zealand
- Last ODI: 10 June 2013 v South Africa
- T20I debut (cap 35): 5 February 2010 v Australia
- Last T20I: 29 November 2011 v Bangladesh

Domestic team information
- Years: Team
- 2005/06–2013/14: Lahore Shalimar
- 2014/15–2018/19: Habib Bank Limited
- 2019/20–2020/21: Balochistan

Career statistics
Competition	Test	ODI	FC	LA
Matches	40	58	156	173
Runs scored	2,400	1,719	11,021	5,770
Batting average	32.00	30.69	42.28	36.28
100s/50s	3/14	1/13	27/47	13/28
Top score	128	107	308	164
Balls bowled	427	116	5,692	2,831
Wickets	3	6	107	84
Bowling average	94.66	18.33	30.45	29.25
5 wickets in innings	0	0	2	0
10 wickets in match	0	0	0	0
Best bowling	2/69	3/10	7/31	4/13
Catches/stumpings	40/–	14/–	137/–	67/–
- Source: ESPNcricinfo, 26 August 2017

Imran Farhat (Punjabi: عمران فرحت, born 20 May 1982) is a Pakistani cricket coach and former cricketer who played for Pakistan national cricket team between 2001 and 2013. He usually opened the batting in most of his international innings. In January 2021, he retired from cricket, following the group stage of the 2020–21 Pakistan Cup.

== Personal life ==
His brother Humayun Farhat has also played International cricket for Pakistan.

He's the son-in-law of former Pakistani Test batsman Mohammad Ilyas.

He is an alumnus of the Beaconhouse School System.

== Cricket career ==
=== Domestic career ===
Farhat made his senior debut aged 15 in a one-day match for Karachi City against Malaysia, together with three other players who went on to play Test cricket (Taufeeq Umar, Bazid Khan and Kamran Akmal).

He continued to score heavily in the domestic competitions and a century in a practice game against the visiting Indian team was rewarded with a place in the squad to take on India in the Test series in 2006.

In the 2012–13 Quaid-e-Azam Trophy, Farhat scored 303 runs for Lahore Ravi against Peshawar. He was the leading run-scorer for Habib Bank Limited in the 2017–18 Quaid-e-Azam Trophy, with 494 runs in ten matches. He was also the leading run-scorer for Habib Bank Limited in the 2018–19 Quaid-e-Azam Trophy, with 744 runs in eleven matches.

He captained Habib Bank Limited to the Quaid-e-Azam Trophy title in the 2018–19 season. In September 2019, he was named in Balochistan's squad for the 2019–20 Quaid-e-Azam Trophy tournament. In January 2021, he was named as the captain of Balochistan for the 2020–21 Pakistan Cup.

=== International career ===
Three years later, in February 2001, Farhat made his One Day International debut, against New Zealand in Auckland, scoring 20 runs in a chase of 150 to win. After the tour of New Zealand, where Farhat played three Tests and three ODIs, he was sent back to domestic cricket before returning against Australia in the third Test of the 2002–03 series, where he made 30 and 22 in an innings defeat. However, he was retained for the home two-Test series against South Africa in 2003–04, where he scored 235 runs including a maiden Test century in a 1–0 series win, second behind fellow opener Taufeeq Umar.

A month later, Farhat played in an ODI-only series against New Zealand, which Pakistan won 5–0, and Farhat made three fifties along with his second international century, ending with 348 runs at a batting average of 69.60, once again the second-highest number of runs – this time behind Yasir Hameed. The season was rounded off with another century, this time against India, where he made 101 to help Pakistan gain a 202-run first-innings lead and eventually won the match by nine wickets. However, Farhat tallied 81 runs in the other two matches, which Pakistan lost to lose the series 1–2.

Farhat was less impressive the following season, however, and in four Tests, two against Sri Lanka and two against Australia, he only passed fifty twice, ending the season with 199 runs at 24.87 before the selectors left him out for the third Test of the series with Australia.

In September 2004, just before the 2004–2005 season, he had been dropped from the ODI side following the 2004 Champions Trophy, as he had failed to pass 40 with any of his last ten innings, and that included 38 not out against the non-Test nation of Kenya, 20 against ODI debutants Hong Kong and 24 against Bangladesh.

He returned to Test cricket in style against India, with an important half century in the deciding third Test at Karachi. He scored a brilliant unbeaten century in the final test against New Zealand in 2009.

== Coaching career ==
In February 2021, he began to undertake level 2 coaching courses with the Pakistan Cricket Board.

In September 2022, he was appointed batting coach to the Bahawalpur Royals squad for the inaugural season of the Pakistan Junior League.

In November 2022, he began to undertake level 3 coaching courses with the PCB.

In February 2023, he was appointed batting coach to the Afghanistan team.
