= Johannes Bothma =

South African cricketer (born 1988)

Personal information
- Full name: Johannes Paulus Bothma
- Born: 28 March 1988 (age 38); Bellville, South Africa
- Batting: Right-handed
- Bowling: Right-arm fast

Domestic team information
- Years: Team
- 2006–2010: Boland
- 2008–present: Cape Cobras
- 2010–present: Western Province
- First-class debut: 15 February 2007 Boland v Western Province
- List A debut: 11 February 2007 Boland v Border

Career statistics
Competition	First-class	List A
Matches	41	32
Runs scored	721	124
Batting average	16.76	12.40
100s/50s	0/2	0/0
Top score	74	47*
Balls bowled	6,027	1,274
Wickets	136	58
Bowling average	24.17	17.68
5 wickets in innings	8	2
10 wickets in match	1	0
Best bowling	6–44	5–29
Catches/stumpings	14/–	6/–
- Source: CricketArchive, 4 April 2012

Johannes Paulus Bothma (born 28 March 1988) is a South African cricketer who currently plays for Western Province and the Cape Cobras. He is a right-handed batsman and right-arm fast bowler. Bothma started his career with Boland and made his first-class debut on 15 February 2007 against Western Province.

Bothma has also played club cricket in England with Colne of the Lancashire League, Whiston Parish Church Cricket Club, and Wolverhampton in the Birmingham Premier League.
