= Steve Davis (umpire) =

Australian cricket umpire (born 1952)

Personal information
- Full name: Stephen James Davis
- Born: 9 April 1952 (age 74); London, England

Umpiring information
- Tests umpired: 57 (1997–2015)
- ODIs umpired: 137 (1992–2015)
- T20Is umpired: 26 (2007–2014)
- WODIs umpired: 5 (2002–2009)
- WT20Is umpired: 3 (2014)
- FC umpired: 129 (1990–present)
- LA umpired: 176 (1991–present)
- T20 umpired: 35 (2007–present)
- Source: CricketArchive, 19 December 2013

Stephen James Davis (born 9 April 1952) is a former Australian Test cricket match umpire, from South Australia. He was appointed to the Elite Panel of ICC Umpires in April 2008.

== Umpiring career ==
Davis' first Test match was between Australia and New Zealand at Hobart on 27 November to 1 December 1997, a rain-affected match in which the last two New Zealand batsman held on to deny victory to Australia.

Since 2002 both umpires in Test matches have been appointed from non-participating nations, by the International Cricket Council. This resulted in his last Test match involving Australia to be against New Zealand at Hobart on 22 November to 26 November 2001, another rain-affected draw. Davis suffered a knee injury and was replaced after the second day by local umpire John Smeaton.

Davis officiated in 3 matches in the 2007 Cricket World Cup, which led to his promotion to the Elite Panel of ICC Umpires in 2008.

On 3 March 2009, Davis was one of the officials caught in the attack on the Sri Lanka cricket team by terrorists in Lahore, Pakistan.

On 9 March 2011 Davis umpired in his 100th one day international when standing at the World Cup group game between India and Netherlands at the Feroz Shah Kotla in New Delhi.

He was selected as one of the twenty umpires to stand in matches during the 2015 Cricket World Cup. In May 2015, Davis announced his retirement following the conclusion of the ODI series between England and New Zealand. On 17 June 2015 he stood in his last match, England vs. New Zealand at Trent Bridge, Nottingham.

== International umpiring statistics ==
As of 18 June 2015:

	First	Last	Total
Tests	Australia v New Zealand at Hobart, November 1997	West Indies v England at St. George's, April 2015	57
ODIs	Pakistan v West Indies at Adelaide, December 1992	New Zealand v England at Trent Bridge, June 2015	137
T20Is	Pakistan v Scotland at Durban, September 2007	England v Netherlands at Chittagong, March 2014	26

== See also ==
- List of Test cricket umpires
- List of One Day International cricket umpires
- List of Twenty20 International cricket umpires
