= Saeed Ajmal =

Pakistani cricketer

Saeed Ajmal SI
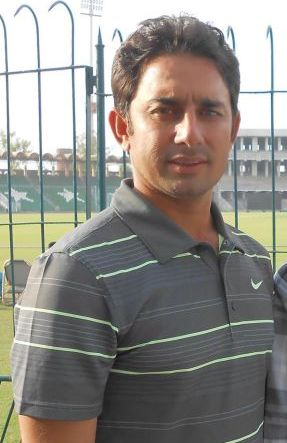
- Saeed Ajmal in 2013

Personal information
- Born: 14 October 1977 (age 49); Faisalabad, Punjab, Pakistan
- Nickname: The Magician
- Height: 5 ft 4 in (163 cm)
- Batting: Right-handed
- Bowling: Right-arm off break
- Role: Bowler
- Website: realsaeedajmal.com

International information
- National side: Pakistan (2008-2015)
- Test debut (cap 195): 4 July 2009 v Sri Lanka
- Last Test: 16 January 2014 v Sri Lanka
- ODI debut (cap 171): 2 July 2008 v India
- Last ODI: 19 April 2015 v Bangladesh
- ODI shirt no.: 50
- T20I debut (cap 31): 7 May 2009 v Australia
- Last T20I: 24 April 2015 v Bangladesh

Domestic team information
- Years: Team
- 1996–2017: Faisalabad
- 2000–2007: Khan Research Laboratories
- 2001–2002: Islamabad
- 2005–2015: Faisalabad Wolves
- 2009–2017: Zarai Taraqiati Bank Ltd
- 2011; 2014–2015: Worcestershire
- 2012: Dhaka Gladiators
- 2012: Adelaide Strikers
- 2013: Barisal Burners
- 2016–2017: Islamabad United
- 2017: Chittagong Vikings

Career statistics
Competition	Test	ODI	FC	LA
Matches	35	113	148	229
Runs scored	451	324	2,007	567
Batting average	11.00	7.04	13.11	7.36
100s/50s	0/1	0/0	0/4	0/0
Top score	50	33	53*	33
Balls bowled	11,592	6,000	34,496	12,082
Wickets	178	184	578	349
Bowling average	28.10	22.72	26.87	24.49
5 wickets in innings	10	2	39	3
10 wickets in match	4	0	7	0
Best bowling	7/55	5/24	7/19	5/18
Catches/stumpings	11/–	25/–	51/–	54/–
- Source: , 27 February 2020

Saeed Ajmal SI (Punjabi, Urdu: سعید اجمل; born 14 October 1977) is a Pakistani cricket coach and former cricketer who played all forms of the game. He is a right-arm off-spin bowler who bats right handed. At domestic level in Pakistan he represented Faisalabad, with whom he won the 2005 ABN-AMRO Twenty-20 Cup; Khan Research Laboratories; and Islamabad. Ajmal made his One Day International debut for Pakistan in July 2008 at the age of 30, and a year later played his first Test. In 2009, he was reported for having a suspect bowling action, but after being cleared he helped Pakistan win the 2009 ICC World Twenty20. Ajmal played for Worcestershire as an overseas player in English domestic cricket in 2011. From November 2011 to December 2014, Ajmal was ranked by the International Cricket Council as the number one bowler in ODIs. He reached the same ranking in T20Is from October to December 2012, while his highest Test ranking was second between January and July of the same year. He is one of four Test bowlers who made their debut after the age of thirty to take more than 100 test wickets, along with Clarrie Grimmett, Dilip Doshi and Ryan Harris.

On 28 January 2012, in his 20th Test, Ajmal became the quickest Pakistani to take 100 Test wickets. He held the record of being the leading wicket taker (85) in Twenty20 International cricket before Shahid Afridi claimed this record (101). He was signed by Adelaide Strikers for the 2012 Big Bash League in Australia.

In 2014, he was banned by the ICC because of an illegal bowling action. Saqlain Mushtaq worked with Ajmal to correct his bowling action. On 27 December 2014, Saeed Ajmal withdrew his name from the Pakistani World Cup squad for the ICC Cricket World Cup 2015 after he was unable to rectify his bowling action.

On 13 November 2017, Ajmal announced his retirement from all forms of cricket. On 29 November 2017, he played his final match, playing for Faisalabad against Lahore Whites, in the semi-finals of the 2017–18 National T20 Cup.

== Cricket career ==
=== Domestic career ===
Saeed Ajmal has played for Faisalabad since his debut in 1995 at the age of 18. Ajmal represented the Faisalabad Wolves in the 2005 ABN-AMRO Twenty-20 Cup, his team won the final in which he was man of the match. When Faisalabad won the final of the ABN-AMRO Patron's Cup in March 2006, Ajmal was named the tournament's best bowler and was given a Rs 25,000 prize. He has also represented Khan Research Laboratories, who were runners-up in the final of the 2008/09 Quaid-i-Azam Trophy; though his team lost the final, Ajmal took 5/105 and 2/55 and in the process passed 250 first-class wickets. Ajmal has also played for Islamabad.

=== International career ===
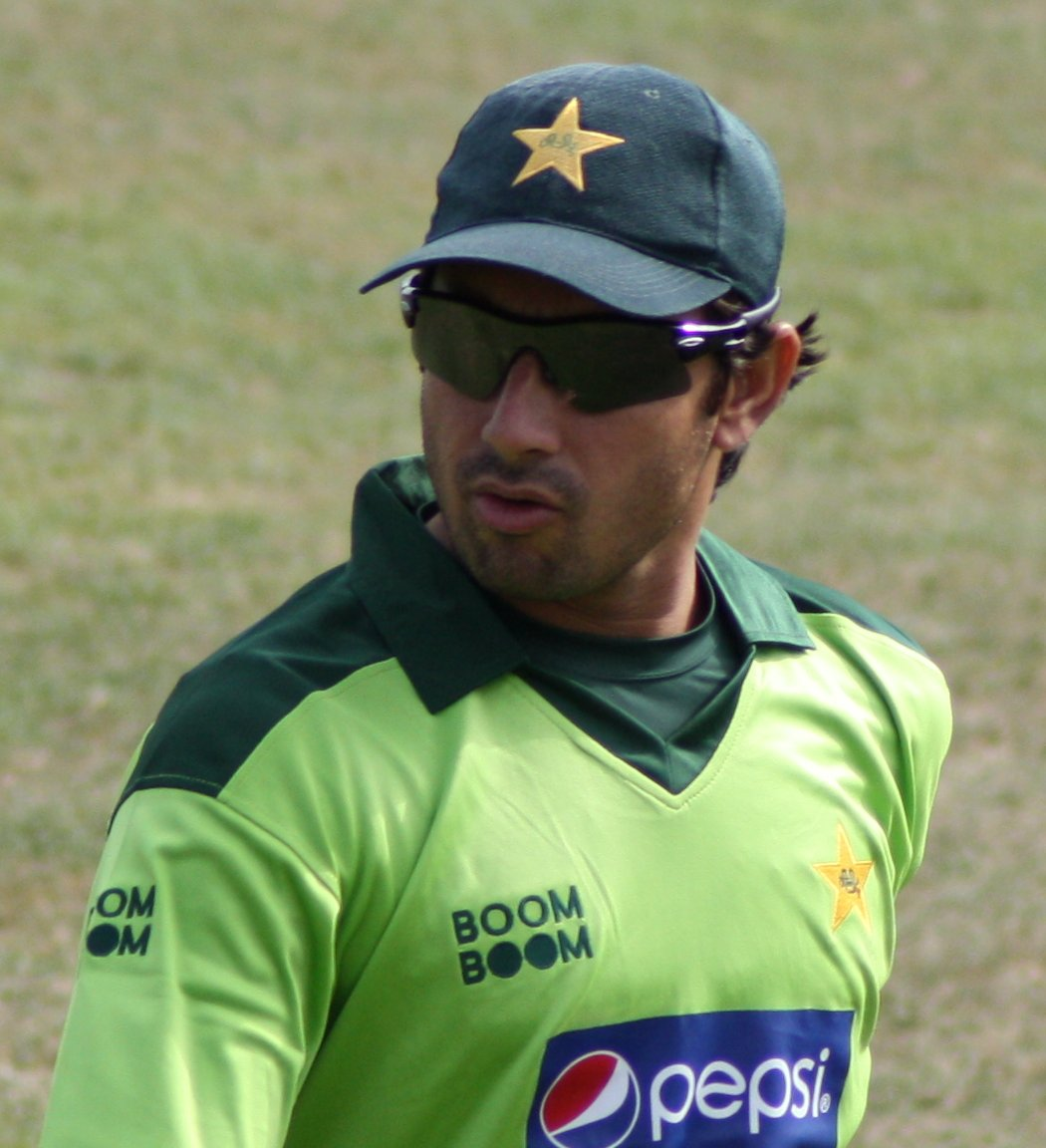
Saeed Ajmal in the field during a 50-over warm-up match against Somerset at the County Ground, Taunton, during Pakistan's 2010 tour of England.

Pakistan hosted the Asia Cup in June 2008; Ajmal was included in the 15-man squad and was expected to act as a foil to Shahid Afridi's leg spin. He made his debut against India on 2 July 2008. Ajmal took a single wicket, that of Yusuf Pathan, from his ten overs while conceding 47 runs (1/47) as Pakistan won by eight wickets, before taking (2/19) in a ten-wicket victory over Bangladesh, although the team had no chance of progressing to the competition's final. In November that year Pakistan travelled to the United Arab Emirates to face the West Indies in a three-match ODI series. Ajmal and Afridi were the team's only spin options; the former took a single wicket while conceding 73 runs and Pakistan won all three matches.

Ajmal's next match the third ODI against Sri Lanka in January 2009. Pakistan faced Australia in the UAE in five ODIs. Playing in all five matches Ajmal took four wickets at an average of 39.50. He was then picked for the Sri Lankan series in Sri Lanka where he had made solid performances in the Test matches, being picked ahead of Danish Kaneria in two of the matches.

In April 2009, Ajmal was reported by umpires for having a suspect bowling action. An independent test the following month demonstrated that Ajmal's arm flexed within the 15-degree tolerance allowed by the International Cricket Council. Later that year, the Pakistan Cricket Board named a pool of 30 players from which they would choose their final squad for the 2009 ICC World Twenty20, held in June. Initially left out, Ajmal was one of three players added to the list, replacing players who were dropped because they were contracted with the controversial Indian Cricket League. In the tournament, Ajmal partnered Afridi. Pakistan won the tournament, and Ajmal was the tournament's joint second highest wicket-taker with twelve dismissals from seven games (only Pakistan's Umar Gul took more wickets, with thirteen dismissals).

Ajmal's form continued in the 2010 ICC World Twenty20 as he was Pakistan's leading wicket taker. However despite his good form he was known for conceding three sixes to Michael Hussey in what has been hailed as the most thrilling Twenty20 match of all time as Australia were in trouble and Ajmal was the unfortunate bowler who bowled that final over.

Shortly after this the Pakistan team began a tour of England where they would face Australia in two Tests in July, and subsequently play England in four Tests and five ODIs. Danish Kaneria was preferred to Ajmal in the first match against Australia, but after Pakistan lost the selectors considered dropping the leg-spinner and choosing Ajmal. In the event, Ajmal was not selected until the second Test against England, when Kaneria was dropped because he had been ineffective. Though Pakistan lost the match by nine wickets, Ajmal took his first five-wicket haul in Tests. In Pakistan's second innings, with his team looking to set a target for England to chase, Ajmal scored 50 from 79 balls, his first half-century in Tests, before he was dismissed by fellow off spinner Graeme Swann.

During the series against England, Pakistan became engulfed in a spot fixing scandal after the fourth test. In a later secret interview it was unveiled by alleged fixer Mazhar Majeed that Ajmal, Abdul Razzaq, Younis Khan and Shahid Afridi were too difficult to bribe. He stated that Ajmal was too religious to get involved into fixing.

After the controversy and upheaval of 2010, 2011 saw Pakistan become a more consistent team. The year began with the World Cup held between February and April. Pakistan progressed to the semi-final, where they were defeated by India; playing in three of the team's matches, Ajmal took five wickets at an average of 18.60. After the World Cup, Pakistan played ten Tests, winning six and losing a single match; this saw the team win series against Bangladesh, New Zealand, Sri Lanka and Zimbabwe and draw with the West Indies. Ajmal finished the year with 50 wickets from 8 Tests, more than any other bowler (second on the list was India's Ishant Sharma with 43). Pakistan were also largely successful in ODIs, winning 24 out of 32. After Pakistan beat Sri Lanka 4–1 in November 2011, Ajmal climbed to the number one spot in the ICC's ODI rankings. He finished the year by taking nine wickets over two Tests in Pakistan's tour of Bangladesh.

Pakistan started 2012 with a three Test series against England in the United Arab Emirates. Ajmal was named the man of the match for the first Test in Dubai, with match figures of 10 wickets for 97 runs and a career best 7/55 in England's first innings. In the second fixture he dismissed Matt Prior to become the fastest Pakistani bowler to reach 100 wickets in Tests, taking 19 matches to accomplish the feat. The series concluded with Pakistan completing a 3–0 whitewash over England, and Ajmal was named man of the series after claiming 24 wickets at an average of 14.70.

In July 2014, he played for the MCC team in the Bicentenary Celebration match at Lord's.

On 13 November 2017, he announced his retirement from all forms of cricket.

=== Franchise career ===
==== County cricket ====
Ajmal was signed by Worcestershire in 2011 as their overseas player. He was signed by them as their overseas player again in 2014 and 2015. He was their highest wicket-taker in County Cricket in 2014 with 56 wickets.

==== Big Bash League ====
Ajmal was signed by Adelaide Strikers for the 2012 Big Bash League in Australia.

==== Hong Kong T20 Blitz 2017 ====
Ajmal became the first bowler as well as first overseas player to pick up a fifer in Hong Kong T20 Blitz.

== Bowling style ==
With HawkEye coming in, left-arm spinners slide the ball on for lbws. Offspinners get a lot of lbws from round the wicket, so you [batsman] have to work really hard, and a bloke who's got a doosra you have to work extra special hard [sic].

— England batsman Kevin Pietersen in 2010

A right-arm off spinner, Ajmal's stock delivery turns into right-handed batsman but he also frequently uses the doosra which turns the other way, and he generally bowls flatter than most off spinners. The doosra has been an effective tool for Ajmal as batsmen have often failed to pick it. Explaining his bowling style in 2012, Ajmal said "If I bowl with flight I cannot bowl well. If I bowl at a quicker speed I can then use variations in pace. If I take 70% of my wickets with the doosra why should I not bowl it? Whether you bowl a doosra or an offbreak, the ball should be bowled on the right line and one should take a wicket with it."

=== ICC ban ===
In 2012, in the immediate aftermath of the three Test series against England in the United Arab Emirates, concluding with Pakistan's 3–0 whitewash over England, following confusion over comments from Ajmal about his bowling action in an interview to the BBC, ESPNCricinfo published detailed information on the issue after a thorough investigation by journalist George Dobell with extensive discussion with ICC having been conducted. The resulting articles underlined the fact that Ajmal's bowling action falls well within the legal bounds set by the ICC for bowlers.

Following a career best innings haul of 7/19 for Worcestershire against Essex, the issue of Ajmal's bowling action was again raised by former England captain Michael Vaughan and current Twenty20 captain Stuart Broad. The latter opined that Ajmal's action in competitive cricket may differ from that which he used during ICC testing. However, as part of the testing procedure, match footage is used alongside videos made "in a lab" and compared to ensure it is identical. Also, umpires are able to super-impose match footage on the testing footage to check that a bowlers' action has not subsequently deteriorated. This has been done in Ajmal's case and his action was found to be identical. Ajmal contacted the ECB to request an explanation for Broad's comments.

The International Cricket Council on 9 September 2014 banned Ajmal over his bowling action. The statement said, "An independent analysis has found the bowling action of Pakistan's off-spinner Saeed Ajmal to be illegal and, as such, the player has been suspended from bowling in international cricket with immediate effect. The analysis revealed that all his deliveries exceeded the 15 degrees level of tolerance permitted under the regulations."

== Post-retirement ==
=== Coaching ===
As of 2018, Ajmal was an assistant coach of PSL team Islamabad United.

=== Business ===
He launched his own fashion brand, Saeed Ajmal Stores, offering ethnic clothing to all age and gender groups, with branches all over the country.

=== Television ===
Year	Show	Channel	Note
2022–2023	The Ultimate Muqabla	ARY Digital	Adventure-action reality show

== Honours ==
He was awarded the third highest civilian award of Pakistan, Sitara-e-Imtiaz for his excellent services for the nation by President of Pakistan Mamnoon Hussain on 23 March 2015.
