= Abdur Rehman (cricketer, born 1980) =

Pakistani cricketer (born 1980)

Abdur Rehman عبدالرّحمٰن
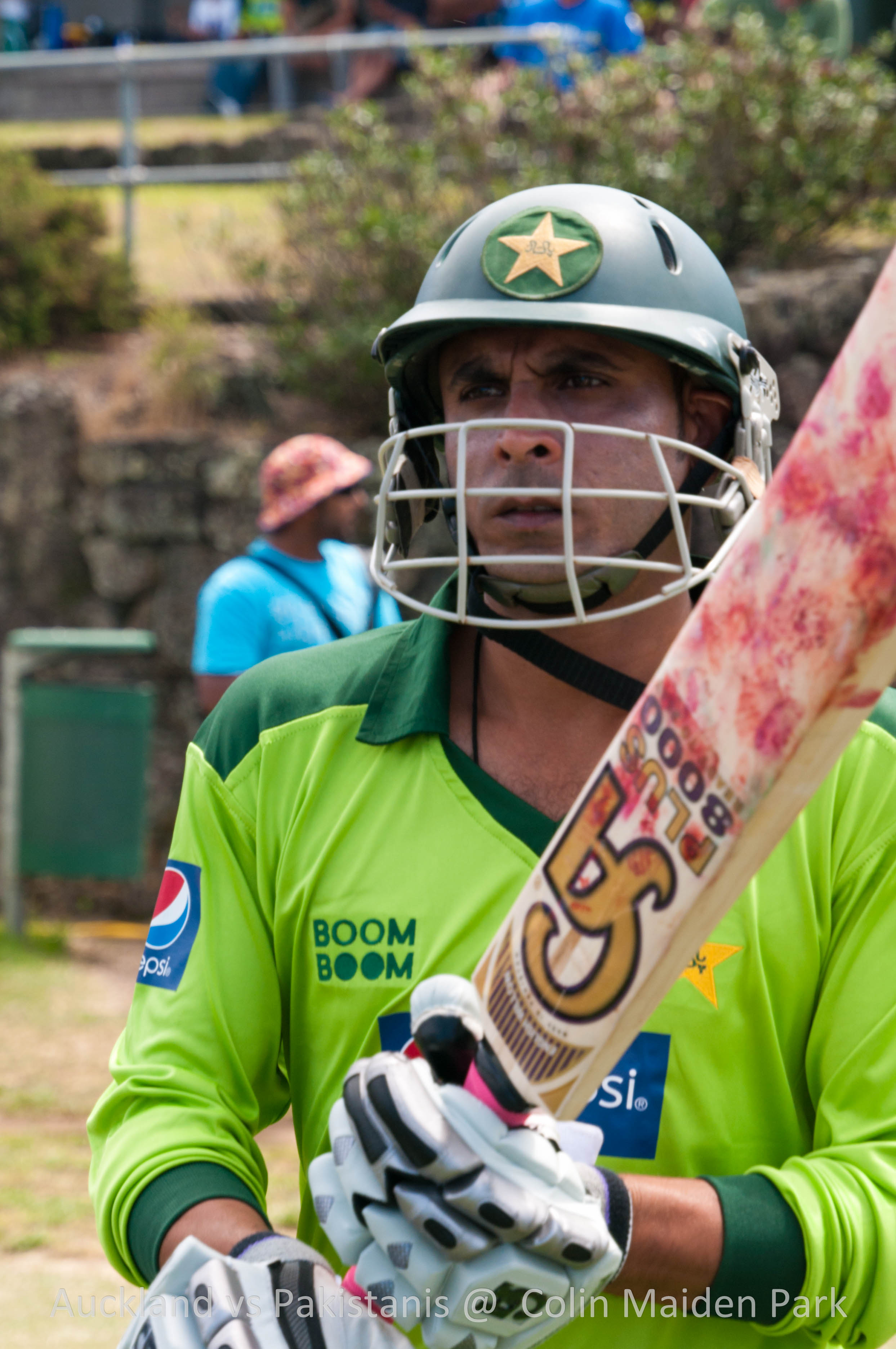

Personal information
- Full name: Abdur Rehman
- Born: 1 March 1980 (age 46); Sialkot, Punjab, Pakistan
- Batting: Left-handed
- Bowling: Slow left arm orthodox
- Role: Bowler

International information
- National side: Pakistan (2006–2014)
- Test debut (cap 187): 1 October 2007 v South Africa
- Last Test: 14 August 2014 v Sri Lanka
- ODI debut (cap 155): 7 December 2006 v West Indies
- Last ODI: 4 March 2014 v Bangladesh
- ODI shirt no.: 36
- T20I debut (cap 12): 2 February 2007 v South Africa
- Last T20I: 13 November 2013 v South Africa
- T20I shirt no.: 36

Domestic team information
- Years: Team
- 1998–2002: Gujranwala
- 1999–2018: Habib Bank Limited
- 2004–2007: Sialkot
- 2005–2015: Sialkot Stallions
- 2012, 2015: Somerset
- 2016: Peshawar Zalmi

Career statistics
Competition	Test	ODI	FC	LA
Matches	22	31	184	174
Runs scored	395	142	3,761	1,257
Batting average	14.10	8.35	16.71	13.23
100s/50s	0/2	0/0	0/18	0/1
Top score	60	31	96	50
Balls bowled	6,892	1,642	38,966	9,086
Wickets	99	30	673	243
Bowling average	29.39	38.06	26.17	27.74
5 wickets in innings	2	0	28	2
10 wickets in match	0	0	6	0
Best bowling	6/25	4/48	9/65	6/16
Catches/stumpings	8/–	7/–	80/–	41/–
- Source: CricketArchive, 3 June 2021

Abdur Rehman (Punjabi, Urdu: عبدالرّحمٰن; born 1 March 1980, Sialkot, Punjab) is a Pakistani former cricketer who played for Pakistan in all formats. He is a slow left-arm orthodox bowler and a left-handed batsman. In October 2018, he announced his retirement from international cricket.

== Domestic career ==
Abdur Rehman in 1999 took hauls of five and six wickets in successive matches while representing Pakistan Under-19 against South Africa. He was picked for the side even though he only had two first-class outings. His performances in domestic competitions have been notable, especially during the 2006–07 season where he ended up as the highest wicket-taker in the Pentangular Cup including an 11-wicket haul for the champions Habib Bank Limited in the penultimate match of the season. He is the signed professional for 2017 playing for Newcastle City in the Northumberland and Tyneside Senior League.

He was the leading wicket-taker for Habib Bank Limited in the 2018–19 Quaid-e-Azam Trophy, with 46 dismissals in nine matches.

== English county cricket ==
Abdur Rehman signed on as one of the two overseas players for Somerset County Cricket Club in July 2012, after the county had suffered a series of setbacks in securing a second overseas signing. After delays over his work permit visa, he played his first match against Nottinghamshire on 7 August. In the last four-day championship match of the 2012 season at the County Ground, Taunton, in September, Abdur Rehman took a career-best tally of 9–95 against Worcestershire.

On 7 November 2014, Abdur Rehman signed a contract to return to Somerset as their overseas player for the entirety of the 2015 season.

== International career ==
In January 2012, Abdur Rehman took his first five-wicket haul in a Test, taking 6/25 as Pakistan bowled England out for 72 in the second innings of the second Test of their series in the United Arab Emirates. He took another five-wicket haul (5/40) in England's first innings of the third Test in Dubai, as Pakistan won the series 3–0.

In 2012 he was banned for 12 weeks by the ECB after testing positive for the drug cannabis.

He bowled three consecutive beamers in an ODI match against Bangladesh on 4 March 2014 and had to be taken off for the match; he became the first bowler to concede 8 runs in one over without bowling a ball. After this performance in this series he has not been picked in all three categories ever since. He was picked by Peshawar Zalmi (PSL's Team) in draft on 22 December 2015.

January 2025 Abdur Rehman has been appointed as the new spin bowling coach of the Pakistan cricket team.
