= Taufeeq Umar =

Pakistani cricketer (born 1981)

Personal information
- Born: 20 June 1981 (age 45); Lahore, Pakistan
- Height: 1.75 m (5 ft 9 in)
- Batting: Left-handed
- Bowling: Right arm off break
- Role: Opening batsman

International information
- National side: Pakistan (2001–2014)
- Test debut (cap 170): 29 August 2001 v Bangladesh
- Last Test: 17 November 2014 v New Zealand
- ODI debut (cap 139): 27 October 2001 v Sri Lanka
- Last ODI: 30 May 2011 v Ireland
- ODI shirt no.: 2

Career statistics
Competition	Test	ODI	FC	LA
Matches	43	22	145	126
Runs scored	2,943	504	8,957	4,431
Batting average	38.72	24.00	37.32	39.91
100s/50s	7/14	0/3	18/48	10/21
Top score	236	81*	236	151*
Balls bowled	78	72	880	1,451
Wickets	0	1	14	34
Bowling average	–	85.00	34.35	36.94
5 wickets in innings	–	0	0	1
10 wickets in match	–	0	0	0
Best bowling	–	1/49	3/33	5/39
Catches/stumpings	47/–	9/–	142/–	81/–
- Source: ESPNcricinfo, 8 August 2017

Taufeeq Umar (Punjabi: توفیق عمر, born 20 June 1981) is a Pakistani former cricketer who played for the Pakistan national cricket team between 2001 and 2014. Umar was a regular Test opening batsman for three seasons, before being dropped ahead of the 2004–05 season. On 23 May 2020, he tested positive for COVID-19, recovering successfully in June 2020.

== International career ==
Unusually for a Pakistani player, Umar has played more Tests than ODIs, as he was not given a prolonged run in the ODI side until 2003, when he played eight ODIs in a row. However, he only missed two of 24 Tests Pakistan played between August 2001 and April 2004, and after 17 Tests his batting average had reached 48.03 after he made four scores above 50 in the two-Test series with South Africa.

Taufeeq Umar known for his solid temperament and ability to build innings. He was selected as Pakistan's opener for the 2003 South Africa tour. However, a loss of form against India in 2024 resulted in him losing his place in the team.

He was recalled into the Pakistani side for the South Africa Series in 2010. He made his comeback against South Africa with some good scores. Against West Indies, he scored a century and then a brilliant double hundred against Sri Lanka at UAE. He has again become a regular part of Test squad as an opener. He continued to play for Pakistan until Sri Lanka in 2012. After the series, he was dropped from the squad, until his later comeback for a single test match in 2014 against New Zealand. He scored only 16 and 4 in the two innings and was dropped from the squad.

== Domestic career ==
He played for Pakistan A against a touring England XI in 2005–06, and continued to play for Lahore Ravi and Habib Bank Limited in Pakistani domestic competitions.

In 2008 he was briefly banned from playing domestic cricket in Pakistan after he joined the rebel Indian Cricket League and represented the Lahore Badshahs. Taufeeq spent a summer in the UK playing Professional League cricket for Lancaster Cricket Club in the Northern League.
