= Asad Shafiq =

Pakistani cricketer

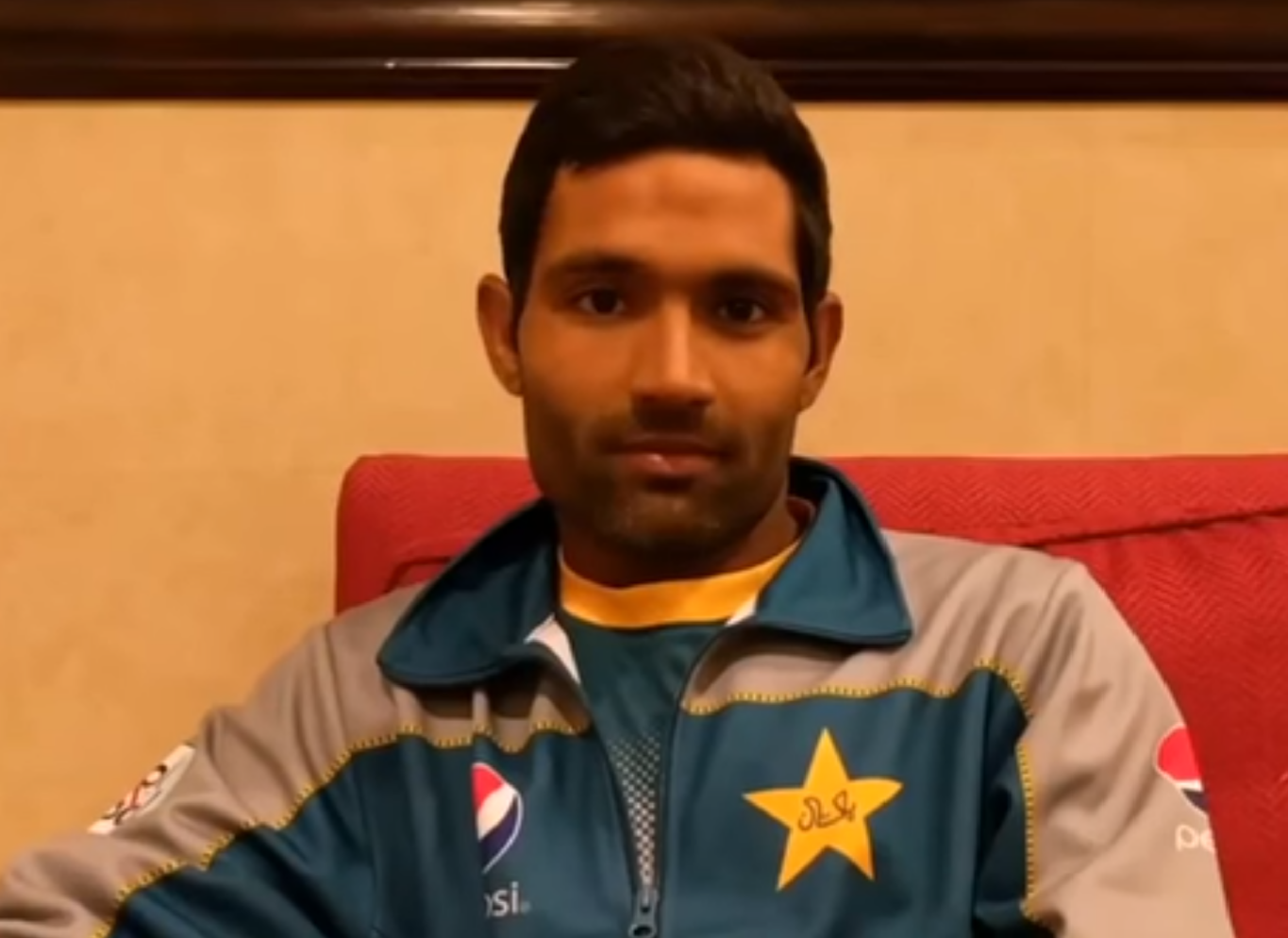
- Shafiq in 2017

Personal information
- Born: 28 January 1986 (age 40); Karachi, Pakistan
- Batting: Right-handed
- Bowling: Right-arm off break
- Role: Middle-order batsman

International information
- National side: Pakistan (2010–2020)
- Test debut (cap 204): 20 November 2010 v South Africa
- Last Test: 21 August 2020 v England
- ODI debut (cap 177): 21 June 2010 v Bangladesh
- Last ODI: 19 January 2017 v Australia
- T20I debut (cap 38): 28 December 2010 v New Zealand
- Last T20I: 27 February 2012 v England

Domestic team information
- Years: Team
- 2007–2009, 2013, 2023/24: Karachi Whites (squad no. 81)
- 2009: Karachi Blues
- 2010: Pakistan International Airlines
- 2011, 2015: Habib Bank Limited
- 2017–2018; 2023/24: Sui Northern Gas Pipelines Limited
- 2016–2018: Quetta Gladiators (squad no. 81)
- 2019–2020: Sindh (squad no. 81)
- 2020: Multan Sultans (squad no. 81)

Career statistics
Competition	Test	ODI	FC	LA
Matches	77	60	177	146
Runs scored	4,660	1,336	10,641	5,400
Batting average	38.19	24.74	40.46	43.20
100s/50s	12/27	0/9	25/58	11/36
Top score	137	84	223	145
Balls bowled	340	12	1746	850
Wickets	3	0	12	14
Bowling average	65.33	–	80.91	56.57
5 wickets in innings	0	–	0	0
10 wickets in match	0	–	0	0
Best bowling	1/7	–	3/85	2/14
Catches/stumpings	67/–	14/–	160/–	56/–
- Source: ESPNcricinfo, 21 August 2020

Asad Shafiq (Urdu: اسد شفیق; born 28 January 1986) is a Pakistani cricket coach and former cricketer who played for the Pakistan national cricket team between 2010 and 2020. He is a member of the Men's National Selection Committee of the Pakistan Cricket Board (PCB).

In August 2018, he was one of 33 players to be awarded a central contract for the 2018–19 season by the PCB. In September 2019, he was named in Sindh's squad for the 2019–20 Quaid-e-Azam Trophy tournament.

== Personal life ==
Shafiq hails from a Gujarati Muslim family. He is fluent in Urdu and English, while he understands and can partially speak Gujarati.

In 2023, he resumed his studies, after having to interrupt them due to his professional cricket career, by joining University of Karachi's BS Health Physical Education and Sports Sciences (HPESS) program.

== Cricket career ==
=== Early career (2007–2010) ===
Asad Shafiq made his first-class debut at 21 years old for Karachi Whites against Hyderabad at Niaz Stadium on 21 October 2007. Although he was only playing because Karachi's Khalid Latif had been called up to play for Pakistan, he managed to score a century in his debut innings, finishing with 113 runs from 183 deliveries. He scored his second century of the season against Faisalabad, batting for more than eight and a half hours to finish with 223 runs from 350 balls, which remains his highest score in a first-class match. He played all ten matches of the 2007–08 Quaid-e-Azam Trophy for Karachi Whites, and finished as their leading run-scorer with 745 runs at an average of 49.66.

Shafiq was less successful in his second season of first-class cricket. He did score a century against Khan Research Laboratories, but it was his only of the season and he only averaged 23.46 in the 2008–09 Quaid-e-Azam Trophy. His major successes of the season came in one-day cricket. He scored 360 runs at an average of 72.00 in the 2008–09 Royal Bank of Scotland Cup, including two centuries, and finished with an average of 54.14 in all one-day matches for the season.

Shafiq switched teams to the Karachi Blues for the 2009–10 Quaid-e-Azam Trophy and scored 1,000 runs in a season for the first time. In eleven Quaid-e-Azam Trophy matches he scored 1,104 runs at an average of 64.94, including four centuries and four half-centuries. As a reward for his stellar form, he was selected to play for Pakistan A in a series of one-day matches against England Lions.

=== First international appearances (2010) ===
Shafiq made it into the national team for the first time in the 2010 Asia Cup when he was selected as part of Pakistan's 15-man squad for the tournament. He joined the team at a turbulent stage for the team, as several players had recently been given bans by the Pakistan Cricket Board for behavioural issues. Shafiq made his ODI debut in a dead rubber match against Bangladesh at the Rangiri Dambulla International Stadium. He scored 17 runs from 19 balls before being stumped by Mushfiqur Rahim off the bowling of Shakib Al Hasan.

Despite having been the top run-scorer in the Quaid-e-Azam Trophy and one of only two players to score more than 1,000 runs in the 2009–10 season, Shafiq was overlooked by national selectors for Pakistan's Test squad to face England. Shafiq's lack of selection, as well as a number of other Karachi players being overlooked, caused the Karachi City Cricket Association to condemn the national selectors for allegedly deliberately ignoring Karachi-based players. Instead, Shafiq was selected to play for Pakistan A on a tour of Sri Lanka. Shafiq was named as a reserve player for Pakistan's later ODI series against England, but he stayed in Sri Lanka with the A team, where he scored a run-a-ball century in a one-day match against Sri Lanka A.

Due to a spot-fixing scandal involving several Pakistani players, Shafiq was flown to England as a replacement player 48 hours before the first ODI, In the first ODI he scored a quickfire 19 runs from 10 deliveries, including 4 boundaries against English bowler Tim Bresnan, and he followed it up in the 2nd ODI with his maiden ODI half-century, 50 runs off of 58 deliveries. He played out the rest of the 5-match series to finish with 120 runs at an average of 24.

Ahead of a series of matches against South Africa in the United Arab Emirates, Shafiq both kept his place in Pakistan's ODI squad and earned his first selection in their Test squad. Shafiq opened the batting in the first two matches, but after only scoring 19 and 1 he was moved back down the order to bat at number 4, where he scored 43 and 36. For the final match of the ODI series he was replaced by Mohammad Yousuf, who had only arrived in the UAE the day before the match.

Shafiq did not play in the first match of the Test series, but after Umar Akmal was dismissed playing a rash shot in the first match, Shafiq took his place in the team for the second Test. Shafiq made his Test cricket debut on 20 November 2010 against South Africa at Sheikh Zayed Cricket Stadium in Abu Dhabi. He had his first opportunity to bat on Day 3 of the Test match, coming in after two wickets had fallen in an over. Shafiq navigated a tricky period of play, particularly playing well against spin bowling, and scored a half-century. He had a 105-run partnership with Misbah-ul-Haq and scored 61 runs from 118 balls.

=== 2010–2023 ===
Shafiq was called into Pakistan's squad for a Twenty20 series in New Zealand after fast bowler Sohail Tanvir was pulled out due to a knee injury. He made his Twenty20 International debut against New Zealand at Seddon Park on 28 December 2010. In the two matches he played, Shafiq only scored 6 and 8, both times scoring at less than a run every ball.

Shafiq was also part of Pakistan's squad for their Test series in New Zealand. In the first Test, when Pakistan were in trouble at 4/107, Shafiq fought back with Misbah-ul-Haq, the two of them reaching the end of the second day with an unbeaten 128-run partnership. The partnership totaled 149 runs and Shafiq scored 83 runs from 202 balls. Pakistan won the match by 10 wickets, so Shafiq was not required to bat again. In the second Test, Shafiq was dismissed for a duck in the first innings and took 23 balls to get off the mark in the second innings before hitting a six off of Daniel Vettori's bowling. He scored 24 runs and Pakistan played out a draw to win the series 1–0, Pakistan's first Test series win since 2006–07 and their first outside of Asia since 2003–04.

Shafiq was included in Pakistan's 15-man squad for the 2011 Cricket World Cup, but he did not play in Pakistan's first four matches of the tournament. He was brought into the team for Pakistan's match against Zimbabwe after Umar Akmal suffered a finger injury, After Pakistan had a shaky start, Shafiq took control of their run chase and scored an unbeaten 78 runs to give Pakistan an easy victory, guaranteeing them a place in the quarter-finals. He then scored a composed 46 in Pakistan's successful run chase against defending World Champions Australia in a match that became Australia's first loss in a World Cup since 1999. Shafiq was not required to bat in Pakistan's 10-wicket quarter-final win over the West Indies, and he played in Pakistan's semi-final against India, but Pakistan lost the match and didn't progress to the World Cup final.

Shafiq scored his first Test century in the opening Test of Pakistan's two-match series against Bangladesh in December 2011. He scored 104 runs in Pakistan's first innings. He played in all three Tests of Pakistan's series against England in the United Arab Emirates in early 2012, scoring 167 runs at an average of 33.40 as Pakistan won the series 3–0.

In March 2019, he was named as the captain of Baluchistan's squad for the 2019 Pakistan Cup.

In June 2020, he was named in a 29-man squad for Pakistan's tour to England during the COVID-19 pandemic. In July, he was shortlisted in Pakistan's 20-man squad for the Test matches against England.

In July 2021, Asad Shafiq lost his central contract after failing to maintain his spot in the national team.

In December 2023, Shafiq announced his retirement from all forms of cricket after he captained Karachi Whites to victory in the 2023-24 National T20 Cup.

=== List of international centuries ===
Shafiq scored 12 centuries (100 or more runs in a single innings) in Tests. He did not score a century in a One Day International (ODI) match nor a Twenty20 International (T20I) match.

List of Test centuries scored by Asad Shafiq
No.	Score	Against	Pos.	Inn.	Test	Venue	H/A/N	Date	Result	Ref
1	104	Bangladesh	6	2	1/2	Zohur Ahmed Chowdhury Stadium, Chittagong	Away	9 December 2011	Won	
2	100*	Sri Lanka	6	3	2/3	Pallekele International Cricket Stadium, Kandy	Away	17 November 2014	Drawn	
3	111	South Africa	6	1	2/3	Newlands Cricket Ground, Cape Town	Away	14 February 2013	Lost	
4	130	South Africa	6	3	2/2	Dubai International Stadium, Dubai	Neutral	23 July 2013	Lost	
5	137	New Zealand	6	3	3/3	Sharjah Cricket Stadium, Sharjah	Neutral	26 November 2014	Lost	
6	107	Bangladesh	6	1	2/2	Sher-e-Bangla National Cricket Stadium, Mirpur	Away	6 May 2015	Won	
7	131	Sri Lanka	6	2	1/3	Galle International Stadium, Galle	Away	17 May 2015	Won	
8	107	England	6	1	1/3	Sheikh Zayed Stadium, Abu Dhabi	Neutral	13 October 2015	Draw	
9	109	England	4	2	4/4	The Oval, London	Away	11 August 2016	Won	
10	137	Australia	6	4	1/3	The Gabba, Brisbane	Away	15 December 2016	Lost	
11	112	Sri Lanka	5	4	1/2	Dubai International Stadium, Dubai	Neutral	6 October 2017	Lost	
12	104	New Zealand	5	2	3/3	Sheikh Zayed Stadium, Abu Dhabi	Neutral	3 December 2018	Lost	

== Post-retirement ==
Following his retirement, Shafiq has been member of both the men's and women's selection panels, and in April 2026 he was made batting coach of the Pakistan national team ahead of the Test tour in Bangladesh.
