= 2004–05 VB Series =

- Part of the Pakistani cricket team in Australia
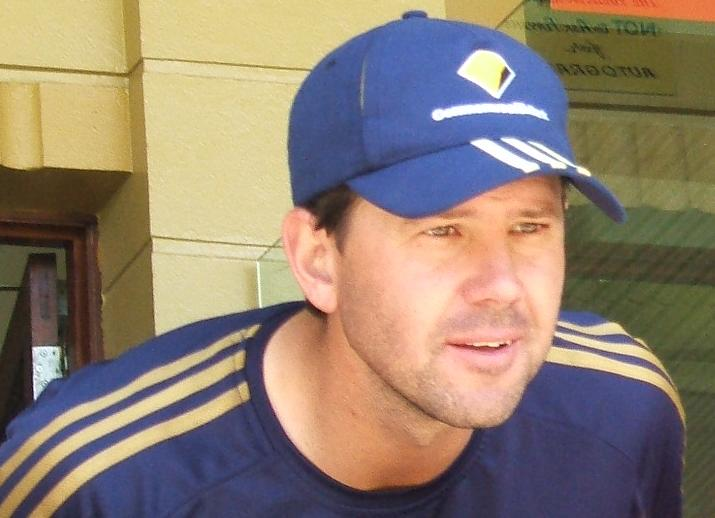
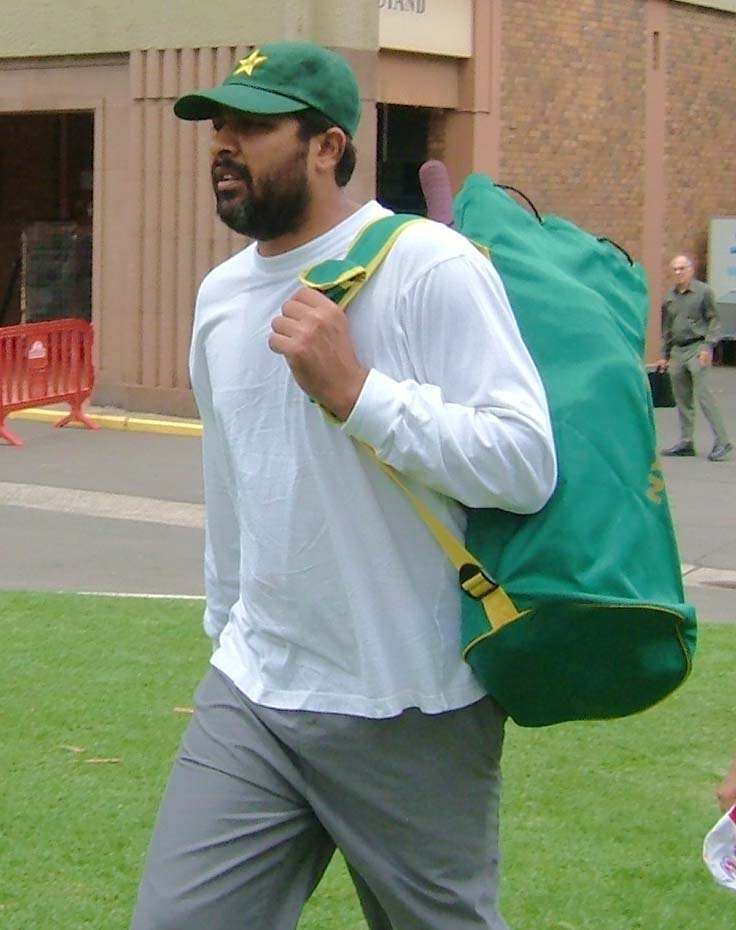
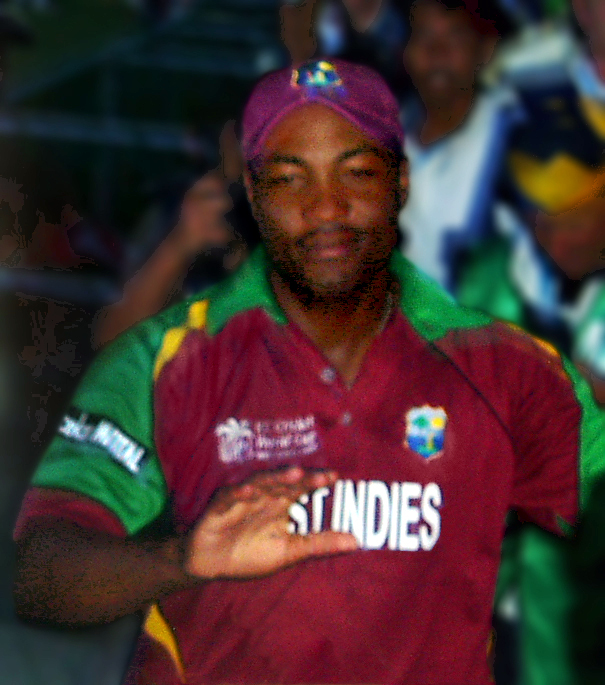
- Ricky Ponting (Aus) • Inzamam-ul-Haq (Pak) • Brian Lara (WI)
- Date: 14 January 2005 – 6 February 2005
- Location: Australia
- Result: Australia (beat Pakistan 2−0 in the finals)
- Player of the series: (Australia) Brett Lee
Teams
Australia	Pakistan	West Indies
Captains
Ricky Ponting	Inzamam-ul-Haq	Brian Lara
Most runs
Clarke (411) Martyn (240) Ponting (184)	Inzamam (364); Mohammad Yousuf (318); Afridi (231)	Chanderpaul (314); Lara (307); Sarwan (235)
Most wickets
Lee (16) McGrath (15) Hogg (10)	Naved (14); Razzaq (13); Afridi (10)	Bradshaw (9); Collins (8); Bravo (5)

The 2004–05 edition of the VB Series (so-called because of sponsor Victoria Bitter) was a three-team One Day International men's cricket tournament held in Australia in January and February 2005, between the hosting nation's team, Pakistan, and West Indies. The teams played each other three times, with five points awarded for a win and a possible bonus point awarded either to the winners or losers depending on run rate. The top two teams on points went through to the best-of-three finals series. Five of the nine preliminary games were day-night matches, and both finals played were night matches.

== Squads ==
Squads
Australia	Pakistan	West Indies
Ricky Ponting (c)	Inzamam-ul-Haq (c)	Brian Lara (c)
Adam Gilchrist (wk)	Kamran Akmal (wk)	Courtney Browne (wk)
Michael Clarke	Mohammad Yousuf	Shivnarine Chanderpaul
Jason Gillespie	Salman Butt	Chris Gayle
Matthew Hayden	Taufeeq Umar	Wavell Hinds
Brad Hogg	Yasir Hameed	Ramnaresh Sarwan
Michael Kasprowicz	Mohammad Hafeez	Marlon Samuels
Brett Lee	Younis Khan	Dwayne Bravo
Simon Katich	Shoaib Malik	Ryan Hinds (Note: Withdrawn on 7 January 2004 due to injury. Replaced with Ricardo Powell.)
Darren Lehmann	Shahid Afridi	Ian Bradshaw
Damien Martyn	Abdul Razzaq	Pedro Collins
Glenn McGrath	Azhar Mahmood	Mervyn Dillon
Andrew Symonds	Shoaib Akhtar	Reon King
Shane Watson	Rana Naved-ul-Hasan	Xavier Marshall
Brad Haddin (wk)	Mohammad Khalil	Ricardo Powell (Note: Added on 7 January 2004. Replaced Ryan Hinds.)

== Group stage table ==
VB Series after 9 matches
Pos	Team	Pld	W	NR/T	L	BP	Pts	NRR
1	Australia	6	4	1	1	3	27	+1.082
2	Pakistan	6	3	0	3	2	17	−0.295
3	West Indies	6	1	1	4	2	10	−0.718

== Schedule ==
No.	Date	Team 1	Team 2	Venue
Group stage schedule
1	14 January 2005	Australia	West Indies	Melbourne Cricket Ground
2	16 January 2005	Australia	Pakistan	Bellerive Oval
3	19 January 2005	West Indies	Pakistan	The Gabba, Brisbane
4	21 January 2005	Australia	West Indies	The Gabba, Brisbane
5	23 January 2005	Australia	Pakistan	Sydney Cricket Ground
6	26 January 2005	Australia	West Indies	Adelaide Oval
7	28 January 2005	Pakistan	West Indies	Adelaide Oval
8	30 January 2005	Australia	Pakistan	WACA Ground
9	1 February 2005	Pakistan	West Indies	WACA Ground
Finals schedule
Final 1	4 February 2005	Australia	Pakistan	Melbourne Cricket Ground
Final 2	6 February 2005	Australia	Pakistan	Sydney Cricket Ground

== Group stage matches ==
=== 1st match: Australia v West Indies, 14 January ===
14 January 2005
14:15 (D/N)
Scorecard

Australia; 301/4 (50 overs)	v	West Indies; 185 (46.2 overs)
Damien Martyn 95 (93); Ian Bradshaw 2/46 (10 overs)		Brian Lara 58 (68); Brad Hogg 5/32 (10 overs)

Australia won by 116 runs
Melbourne Cricket Ground, Melbourne
Attendance: 51,433
Umpires: Steve Davis (Aus) and Rudi Koertzen (SA)
Player of the match: Brad Hogg (Aus)

- Australia won the toss and elected to bat
- Xavier Marshall (Win) made his ODI debut.

=== 2nd match: Australia v Pakistan, 16 January ===
16 January 2005
10:00
Scorecard

Pakistan; 272/7 (50 overs)	v	Australia; 253/6 (43 overs)
Inzamam-ul-Haq 68 (64); Michael Kasprowicz 2/38 (9 overs)		Michael Clarke 97 (99); Abdul Razzaq 2/41 (8 overs)

Australia won by 4 wickets (with 12 balls remaining) (D/L method)
Bellerive Oval, Hobart
Umpires: Billy Bowden (NZL) and Daryl Harper (Aus)
Player of the match: Michael Clarke (Aus)

- Pakistan won the toss and elected to bat

=== 3rd match: Pakistan v West Indies, 19 January ===
19 January 2005
13:15 (D/N)
Scorecard

West Indies; 273/5 (50 overs)	v	Pakistan; 274/4 (47 overs)
Chris Gayle 82 (99); Rana Naved-ul-Hasan 2/55 (10 overs)		Kamran Akmal 124 (125); Mervyn Dillon 2/46 (10 overs)

Pakistan won by 6 wickets (with 18 balls remaining)
The Gabba, Brisbane
Umpires: Rudi Koertzen (SA) and Peter Parker (Aus)
Player of the match: Kamran Akmal (Pak)

- Pakistan won the toss and elected to bat

=== 4th match: Australia v West Indies, 21 January ===
21 January 2005
13:15 (D/N)
Scorecard

West Indies; 263/9 (50 overs)	v	Australia; 43/5 (11 overs)
Wavell Hinds 107 (138); Jason Gillespie 3/62 (9 overs)		Damien Martyn 14* (16); Pedro Collins 3/8 (4 overs)

No result
The Gabba, Brisbane
Umpires: Billy Bowden (NZL) and Simon Taufel (Aus)

- West Indies won the toss and elected to bat

=== 5th match: Australia v Pakistan, 23 January ===
23 January 2005
14:15 (D/N)
Scorecard

Pakistan; 163 (39.2 overs)	v	Australia; 167/1 (36.2 overs)
Inzamam-ul-Haq 50 (61); Darren Lehmann 3/44 (7.2 overs)		Michael Clarke 103* (107); Abdul Razzaq 1/43 (7 overs)

Australia won by 9 wickets (with 82 balls remaining)
Sydney Cricket Ground, Sydney
Umpires: Daryl Harper (Aus) and Rudi Koertzen (SA)
Player of the match: Michael Clarke (Aus)

- Australia won the toss and elected to field

=== 6th match: Australia v West Indies, 26 January ===
26 January 2005
13:45 (D/N)
Scorecard

Australia; 269/8 (50 overs)	v	West Indies; 196 (44.5 overs)
Simon Katich 76 (86); Pedro Collins 5/43 (10 overs)		Shivnarine Chanderpaul 55 (87); Brett Lee 4/38 (10 overs)

Australia won by 73 runs
Adelaide Oval, Adelaide
Umpires: Billy Bowden (NZL) and Steve Davis (Aus)
Player of the match: Brett Lee (Aus)

- Australia won the toss and elected to bat.

=== 7th match: Pakistan v West Indies, 28 January ===
28 January 2005
9:30
Scorecard

West Indies; 339/4 (50 overs)	v	Pakistan; 281/9 (50 overs)
Brian Lara 156 (138); Mohammad Hafeez 3/34 (3 overs)		Mohammad Yousuf 45 (46); Dwayne Bravo 2/39 (10 overs)

West Indies won by 58 runs
Adelaide Oval, Adelaide
Umpires: Daryl Harper (Aus) and Rudi Koertzen (SA)
Player of the match: Brian Lara (WIN)

- Pakistan won the toss and elected to field.

=== 8th match: Australia v Pakistan, 30 January ===
30 January 2005
13:30 (D/N)
Scorecard

Australia; 265 (50 overs)	v	Pakistan; 268/7 (47.2 overs)
Michael Clarke 75* (75); Abdul Razzaq 4/53 (10 overs)		Mohammad Yousuf 72 (90); Glenn McGrath 2/27 (9 overs)

Pakistan won by 3 wickets (with 16 balls remaining)
WACA Ground, East Perth
Umpires: Billy Bowden (NZL) and Peter Parker (Aus)
Player of the match: Abdul Razzaq (Pak)

- Australia won the toss and elected to bat.
- Mohammad Khalil (Pak) made his ODI debut.

=== 9th match: Pakistan v West Indies, 1 February ===
1 February 2005
10:30
Scorecard

Pakistan; 307/8 (50 overs)	v	West Indies; 277 (48.1 overs)
Mohammad Yousuf 105 (100); Ian Bradshaw 3/47 (10 overs)		Ramnaresh Sarwan 87 (91); Rana Naved-ul-Hasan 4/29 (9.1 overs)

Pakistan won by 30 runs
WACA Ground, East Perth
Umpires: Steve Davis (Aus) and Rudi Koertzen (SA)
Player of the match: Mohammad Yousuf (PAK)

- West Indies won the toss and elected to field.

== Finals ==
=== 1st final: Australia v Pakistan, 4 February ===
4 February 2005
14:15 (D/N)
Scorecard

Australia; 237 (49 overs)	v	Pakistan; 219/9 (50 overs)
Andrew Symonds 91 (101); Abdul Razzaq 3/33 (10 overs)		Shoaib Malik 66 (89); Brett Lee 3/23 (10 overs)

Australia won by 18 runs
Melbourne Cricket Ground, Melbourne
Umpires: Billy Bowden (NZL) and Steve Davis (Aus)
Player of the match: Andrew Symonds (Aus)

- Australia won the toss and elected to bat.

=== 2nd final: Australia v Pakistan, 6 February ===
6 February 2005
14:15 (D/N)
Scorecard

Australia; 239/9 (50 overs)	v	Pakistan; 208 (45.4 overs)
Damien Martyn 43 (60); Shahid Afridi 2/38 (10 overs)		Mohammad Yousuf 51 (57); Glenn McGrath 5/27 (7.4 overs)

Australia won by 31 runs
Sydney Cricket Ground, Sydney
Umpires: Daryl Harper (Aus) and Rudi Koertzen (SA)
Player of the match: Glenn McGrath (Aus)

- Australia won the toss and elected to bat.
