= Indian cricket team in Pakistan in 2005–06 =

International cricket tour

Indian cricket team in Pakistan in 2005-06
	India	Pakistan
- Dates: 7 January – 20 February 2006
Captains	Rahul Dravid	Inzamam-ul-Haq

Test series
- Result: Pakistan won the 3-match series 1–0
Most runs	Virender Sehwag (294)	Younis Khan (553)
Most wickets	Zaheer Khan (10)	Abdul Razzaq (9)
- Player of the series: Younis Khan (Pak)

One Day International series
- Results: India won the 5-match series 4–1
Most runs	Yuvraj Singh (344)	Shoaib Malik (314)
Most wickets	Irfan Pathan (9)	Mohammad Asif (5); Rana Naved-ul-Hasan (5)
- Player of the series: Yuvraj Singh (Ind)

The India national cricket team toured Pakistan for cricket matches during the 2005–06 season. Both India and Pakistan had already played Test matches during this season; India were coming off a 2–0 series win at home over Sri Lanka, while Pakistan beat England by the same margin. In ODI cricket, India's last series, in November 2005, ended in a 2–2 draw with South Africa, while Pakistan beat England 3–2 in December 2005. The tour began on 7 January 2006 with India playing Pakistan A in a non-first class game, and continued till 19 February.

Pakistan's captain, Inzamam-ul-Haq, said that India started as favourites in the Test series, while former fast bowler Sarfraz Nawaz has said that "it's easy to get them (Indian batsmen) out". The official ICC Test Championship had India in second place and Pakistan in fourth, while the ICC ODI Championship had Pakistan in the third place and India in the fifth place, at the end of 2005.

== Squads ==
Tests		ODIs	
Pakistan	India	Pakistan	India
Inzamam-ul-Haq (c); Younis Khan (vc); Mohammad Yousuf; Abdul Razzaq; Shoaib Akhtar; Shahid Afridi; Mohammad Sami; Shoaib Malik; Salman Butt; Naved-ul-Hasan; Kamran Akmal (wk); Arshad Khan; Danish Kaneria; Imran Farhat; Mohammad Asif; Faisal Iqbal; Umar Gul	Rahul Dravid (c); Virender Sehwag (vc); Gautam Gambhir; Wasim Jaffer; Sachin Tendulkar; VVS Laxman; Yuvraj Singh; Sourav Ganguly; MS Dhoni (wk); Parthiv Patel (wk); Irfan Pathan; Zaheer Khan; Ajit Agarkar; Anil Kumble; Harbhajan Singh; R. P. Singh	Inzamam-ul-Haq (c); Younis Khan (vc); Mohammad Yousuf; Abdul Razzaq; Shoaib Malik; Kamran Akmal (wk); Arshad Khan; Salman Butt; Naved-ul-Hasan; Imran Farhat; Faisal Iqbal; Umar Gul; Mohammad Asif; Yasir Arafat; Mohammad Sami; Rao Iftikhar Anjum; ~~Shoaib Akhtar~~; ~~Shahid Afridi~~	Rahul Dravid (c); Virender Sehwag (vc); Sachin Tendulkar; Gautam Gambhir; Yuvraj Singh; Mohammad Kaif; Suresh Raina; MS Dhoni (wk); Irfan Pathan; Ajit Agarkar; Zaheer Khan; R. P. Singh; Sreesanth; Murali Kartik; Harbhajan Singh; Ramesh Powar

== Test series ==
=== Tour match: Pakistan A v Indians (7–9 January) ===
7–9 January 2006
Scorecard

Indians	v	Pakistan A
414/7d (104 overs); Sachin Tendulkar 74 (102); Mohammad Irshad 2/79 (19 overs)		358/9d (95 overs); Imran Farhat 107 (162); Irfan Pathan 3/82 (22 overs)
72/0 (13 overs); Wasim Jaffer 35* (43); Iftikhar Anjum 0/17 (5 overs)

Match drawn
Bagh-e-Jinnah, Lahore
Umpires: Riazuddin (Pak) and Zameer Haider (Pak)

- Indians won the toss and elected to bat.

Match drawn

The Indians won the toss and chose to bat at the Bagh-e-Jinnah in Lahore, and in 77 overs on the first day, they made 298 for four after half-centuries from Gautam Gambhir, Wasim Jaffer, Rahul Dravid and Sachin Tendulkar. V. V. S. Laxman and Yuvraj Singh retired after making half-centuries on the second day, and after 27 second-day overs the tourists declared 414 ahead. The Indian seamers Ajit Agarkar and Irfan Pathan got a wicket each in their opening spell, but a 162-run stand between Imran Farhat and Hasan Raza closed the gap. Pathan eventually broke the partnership when Raza, the captain of Pakistan A, was caught behind for 75 off 62 balls, and Farhat was also out shortly afterwards, ending with 107. Faisal Iqbal made 87 for Pakistan A on the final day before they declared on 358 for 9, and Gambhir and Jaffer batted out 13 overs before the game was declared a draw.

=== First Test ===
13–17 January 2006
Scorecard

Pakistan	v	India
679/7d (143.3 overs); Younis Khan 199 (336); Ajit Agarkar 2/122 (24 overs)		410/1 (77.2 overs); Virender Sehwag 254 (247); Rana Naved-ul-Hasan 1/94 (16 overs)

Match drawn
Gaddafi Stadium, Lahore
Umpires: Darrell Hair (Aus) and Rudi Koertzen (SA)
Player of the match: Virender Sehwag (Ind)

- Pakistan won the toss and elected to bat.

==== Day 1 ====
Pakistan won the toss, and after losing Salman Butt in a run out with the thirteenth ball of the match, but as Irfan Pathan was the only one to take a wicket, Pakistan built a lead of 326 on the first day of the match in Lahore. The BBC described their batsman as "dominating India" in a headline, with Shoaib Malik, Younis Khan and Mohammad Yousuf all passing fifty on the first day.

Sourav Ganguly returned for India, after being left out of the ODI side on recent tours, and the former captain saw action in the first session when he was called upon to bowl four overs of medium pace, but neither he nor any of the two spinners Harbhajan Singh and Anil Kumble could get a wicket in the morning session, and Malik completed his half-century off 109 balls just before the lunch break when he turned a ball from Kumble around to make two runs. The century stand came up shortly afterwards, before Pathan got the only wicket to a bowler's name on the first day; Malik was caught by Harbhajan for 59 off 145 balls. However, another century stand was to follow - Pakistan were 220 for 2 at tea, and Yousuf and Younis added a further 106 in the evening session, 30 of those coming in the last five overs against the new ball. With five overs remaining on the clock, bad light stopped play, with Yousuf five short of his century; in the previous over, he had been dropped by Sehwag in the gully.

Close of play: Pakistan 326/2 (Younis Khan 147*, Mohammad Yousuf 95*; 85 overs)

==== Day 2 ====
Pakistan continued to build their first innings total in the morning. Yousuf reached 173 before being stumped off an Anil Kumble delivery. Younis increased his score to 199 before being runout. Shahid Afridi scored a quick century, plundering 27 off a Harbhajan Singh over in the process. This equalled the second highest score off a single over in Test matches. Harbhajan had some small measure of revenge however, taking the catch that dismissed Afridi for 103. Wicketkeeper Kamran Akmal also scored a century, the fastest ever by a wicketkeeper, and Pakistan declared immediately thereafter with a mammoth total of 679 for 7.

Virender Sehwag and Rahul Dravid opened India's first innings. They successfully withstood 13 overs before bad light stopped play and had scored 65 runs in the process.

Close of play: Pakistan 679/7d, India 65/0 (Sehwag 36*, Dravid 22*; 13 overs)

==== Day 3 ====
In a rain interrupted day reduced to just 15 overs, Sehwag and Dravid advanced India's score to 145, with Sehwag finishing the day on 96 not out.

Close of Play: India 145/0 (Sehwag 96*, Dravid 37*; 28 overs)

==== Day 4 ====
Sehwag and Dravid continued their partnership throughout the day, with Sehwag recording the second-fastest double century in test history by reaching 200 off 181 balls. By the end of the day Sehwag and Dravid were just 11 runs short of the record opening stand set by India fifty years ago.

Close of play: India 403/0 (Sehwag 247*, Dravid 128*; 75 overs)

==== Day 5 ====
India resumed at 403 for no wicket and there was no prospect of a result in another interrupted day's play. Sehwag finally fell for 254, leaving India just three runs short of the record partnership. Play was abandoned at the tea interval.

Close of Play: India 410/1 (Sehwag 254; Dravid 128*)

=== Second Test ===
21–25 January 2006
Scorecard

Pakistan	v	India
588 (136.2 overs); Shahid Afridi 156 (128); R. P. Singh 4/89 (25 overs)		603 (165.4 overs); Mahendra Singh Dhoni 148 (153); Danish Kaneria 3/165 (54 overs)
490/8d (116.4 overs); Younis Khan 194 (299); Zaheer Khan 4/61 (19.4 overs)		21/0 (8 overs); VVS Laxman 8* (19)

Match drawn
Iqbal Stadium, Faisalabad
Umpires: Rudi Koertzen (SA) and Simon Taufel (Aus)
Player of the match: R. P. Singh (Ind)

- Pakistan won the toss and elected to bat.
- R. P. Singh (Ind) made his Test debut.

==== Day 1 ====
Both sides made two changes, with India dropping Sourav Ganguly and Ajit Agarkar for Zaheer Khan and R. P. Singh, with Agarkar suspected to have a hamstring injury. India elected to choose five bowlers on what was an excellent batting pitch. This is the first time that a Test team has fielded three left-arm fast bowlers. Pakistan dropped Rana Naved-ul-Hasan and the ill Mohammad Sami, with Abdul Razzaq and Mohammad Asif coming in. Pakistan won the toss, batting first to reach 4/379 at stumps with Inzamam-ul-Haq & Shahid Afridi approaching centuries, on 79 and 85 respectively. On a tough day for bowling, R. P. Singh made a promising debut, taking three wickets.

==== Day 2 ====
Play resumed on day two with Razzaq replacing Inzamam, who was confined to the dressing room due to a back injury. Afridi reached 156 from just 128 deliveries before being dismissed, ending a combined partnership of 257 with Inzamam and Razzaq. Inzamam returned to complete his century (119), and free-spirited hitting on a benign pitch by Shoaib Akhtar (47) allowed Pakistan to reach 588. R. P. Singh took 4/89, the best bowling figures. India started their reply confidently until Virender Sehwag (31) was dismissed. Captain Rahul Dravid (46*)and V. V. S Laxman (28*) proceeded cautiously to end the day at 1/110.

==== Day 3 ====
Laxman and Dravid batted fluently throughout the first session to reach lunch at 83 and 97 respectively. India suffered a collapse after lunch, losing 4/45 as Laxman (90), Dravid (103, run out), Sachin Tendulkar (14, walking despite replays suggesting he missed the ball) and Yuvraj Singh (4) were all dismissed. However, MS Dhoni (116*) and Irfan Pathan (49*) counter-attacked to save the follow-on to close at 5/441.

==== Day 4 ====
Dhoni and Pathan continued their partnership until Dhoni (148) was stumped trying to loft Kaneria over midwicket, ending a 210-run partnership. Pathan fell short of a century (90), but the tail wagged (Harbhajan Singh 38, Zaheer Khan 20*) to give India 603, and a slender lead of 15. Pakistan started their second innings confidently, reaching 1/152 at the close with Younis Khan on 64 and Kamran Akmal (opening in place of Shoaib Malik who had returned to Sialkot to be with his gravely ill father) on 59.

==== Day 5 ====
Akmal was dismissed on 78, but Younis reached his fourth century in as many Tests against India. Along with Mohammad Yousuf (126), they added 262 for the third wicket. The loss of Razzaq (32) and Younis (194) caused a collapse of 5/2 reduced Pakistan to 8/490. This was the end of the innings, as both Inzamam and Malik were unavailable to bat. Zaheer Khan took 4/61. India batted 8 overs to reach 0/21 were the match was drawn.

As the game faded away, Indian wicket-keeper MS Dhoni and Pakistani batsman Younis Khan, both infrequent bowlers at international level, took the new ball. R. P. Singh was named the Man of the Match, on his debut.

=== Third Test ===
29 January–2 February 2006
Scorecard

Pakistan	v	India
245 (60.1 overs); Kamran Akmal 113 (148); Irfan Pathan 5/61 (17.1 overs)		238 (54.1 overs); Yuvraj Singh 45 (74); Mohammad Asif 4/78 (19.1 overs)
599/7d (140.1 overs); Faisal Iqbal 139 (220); Anil Kumble 3/151 (37.1 overs)		265 (58.4 overs); Yuvraj Singh 122 (144); Abdul Razzaq 4/88 (18.4 overs)

Pakistan won by 341 runs
National Stadium, Karachi
Umpires: Daryl Harper (Aus) and Simon Taufel (Aus)
Player of the match: Kamran Akmal (Pak)

- India won the toss and elected to field.

== ODI series ==
=== First ODI ===
6 February 2006
Scorecard

India; 328 (49.4 overs)	v	Pakistan; 311/7 (47 overs)
Sachin Tendulkar 100 (113); Rana Naved-ul-Hasan 4/62 (10 overs)		Salman Butt 101 (111); Ajit Agarkar 2/58 (9 overs)

Pakistan won by 7 runs (D/L)
Arbab Niaz Stadium, Peshawar
Umpires: Asad Rauf (Pak) and Simon Taufel (Aus)
Player of the match: Salman Butt (Pak)

- Pakistan won the toss and elected to field.
- Bad light stopped play and Pakistan's target was reduced to 305 runs from 47 overs according to the Duckworth–Lewis method.

=== Second ODI ===
11 February 2006
Scorecard

Pakistan; 265/7 (50 overs)	v	India; 266/3 (43.1 overs)
Shoaib Malik 95 (110); Irfan Pathan 3/43 (10 overs)		Yuvraj Singh 82* (89); Shoaib Malik 1/24 (3 overs)

India won by 7 wickets
Rawalpindi Cricket Stadium, Rawalpindi
Umpires: Asad Rauf (Pak) and Simon Taufel (Aus)
Player of the match: Irfan Pathan (Ind)

- Pakistan won the toss and elected to bat.

=== Third ODI ===
13 February 2006
Scorecard

Pakistan; 288/8 (50 overs)	v	India; 292/5 (47.4 overs)
Shoaib Malik 108 (120); Irfan Pathan 3/49 (10 overs)		Sachin Tendulkar 95 (104); Mohammad Asif 2/47 (10 overs)

India won by 5 wickets
Gaddafi Stadium, Lahore
Umpires: Asad Rauf (Pak) and Simon Taufel (Aus)
Player of the match: Mahendra Singh Dhoni (Ind)

- India won the toss and elected to field.

=== Fourth ODI ===
16 February 2006
Scorecard

Pakistan; 161 (41.5 overs)	v	India; 162/5 (32.3 overs)
Inzamam-ul-Haq 49 (63); R. P. Singh 4/40 (10 overs)		Rahul Dravid 59 (72); Mohammad Sami 3/42 (9 overs)

India won by 5 wickets
Multan Cricket Stadium, Multan
Umpires: Asad Rauf (Pak) and Steve Bucknor (WI)
Player of the match: R. P. Singh (Ind)

- India won the toss and elected to field.

=== Fifth ODI ===
19 February 2006
Scorecard

Pakistan; 286/8 (50 overs)	v	India; 287/2 (46.5 overs)
Younis Khan 74* (79); Sreesanth 4/58 (10 overs)		Yuvraj Singh 107* (93); Iftikhar Anjum 1/44 (10 overs)

India won by 8 wickets
National Stadium, Karachi
Umpires: Aleem Dar (Pak) and Steve Bucknor (WI)
Player of the match: Yuvraj Singh (Ind)

- India won the toss and elected to field.
