= Chappell–Ganguly controversy =

2005–2006 controversy in Indian cricket

The Chappell–Ganguly controversy was caused by a series of events in late 2005 and early 2006 which involved highly publicised infighting in the Indian cricket team between the then newly appointed coach Greg Chappell and captain Sourav Ganguly. The dispute resulted in the removal of Ganguly as captain and his replacement by vice-captain Rahul Dravid in November 2005, with Ganguly being dropped from the ODI team. Ganguly was also dropped from the Test team at the end of January 2006. The dispute stirred up strong emotions in India, ranging from fiery street protests in Ganguly's home town of Kolkata and his home state of West Bengal, to speeches in the Parliament of India. Eventually Ganguly was recalled to the team in both forms of cricket in late 2006 after his replacements lost form, and was selected as a part of the Indian team for the 2007 Cricket World Cup, where India were knocked out in the group stage.

== Background ==
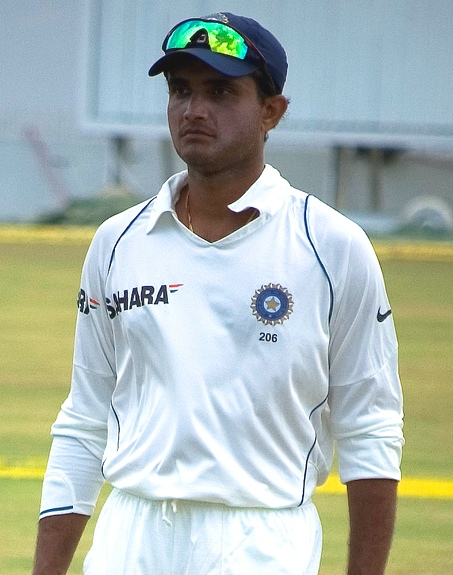
Sourav Ganguly

Greg Chappell, a former captain of the Australian cricket team, was selected as the new Indian coach, after the incumbent coach John Wright, a former captain of the New Zealand cricket team, did not renew his contract at the end of the 2004/05 international season. India went through an indifferent 2004–05 season, being eliminated from the Champions Trophy in the Group stage, losing the Border–Gavaskar Trophy by a margin of 2–1, their first series loss to Australia on home soil since 1969, squandering a 1–0 Test series lead against Pakistan to level the series 1–1 and then losing the last four ODIs to lose the ODI series against the same opponents 4–2. However, John Wright's tenure had also seen India enter the finals of the 2003 Cricket World Cup after a poor start to the tournament, sharing victory in the 2002 Champions Trophy with Sri Lanka, and achieving famous Test wins in England, Australia, Pakistan and the West Indies. John Wright's role in historic victories for India brought importance and prestige to the position of coach in Indian cricket.

Chappell was chosen over the other contenders Dav Whatmore, Mohinder Amarnath, Graham Ford, Desmond Haynes, Tom Moody and John Emburey in a highly publicised selection process. Although lacking the experience and coaching credentials of his rivals, Chappell had emerged as the favourite in the media, and secured the appointment with the active support of the Indian captain Sourav Ganguly, who had earlier taken batting tips from Chappell during the successful 2003–04 tour of Australia. Ganguly had put forth Chappell's name twice in April 2005, even when other senior members in the national team were not consulted on the matter. Chappell soon became the centre of the Indian media's attention, and his prominence and dominant personality soon began to clash with Ganguly, who had earned a reputation for being a successful and tough captain.

India's first tournament under Chappell was the 2005 Indian Oil Cup in Sri Lanka, with Rahul Dravid captaining the team. This came about after Ganguly was serving a 4 match suspension for slow over rates during the series against Pakistan in early 2005. The tournament saw Chappell introduce young batsmen such as Suresh Raina and Venugopal Rao, due to the suspension of Ganguly and the axing of V. V. S. Laxman. With Ganguly's suspension expiring, he was reinstated as the captain on the tour to Zimbabwe. Ganguly entered the series having not scored a Test century for almost two years since late 2003, when he scored 144 against Australia in Brisbane.

== Zimbabwe tour and email leak ==
The tour began with a warmup game during which Chappell asked Ganguly to step down from the captaincy and focus on his batting. Chappell said that Ganguly's slump in batting form would affect the "other areas of his game", but expressed confidence about Ganguly regaining his form on the tour.

Before the first Test, Chappell stated that they should pick the best XI for the match, and that, if left to him, he would pick both Yuvraj Singh and Mohammad Kaif ahead of Ganguly. Irked by this, Ganguly decided to pack his bags and leave the tour. The team director Amitabh Chowdhary, along with Chappell and Dravid, insisted that he continue to play, as the captain leaving the team in the middle of the tour would be disastrous. After rumours emerged that Ganguly had allegedly faked an injury during the match, he made defiant comments to the media, in which he accused members of team management of trying to pressure him to resign as captain, although he would not name individuals. He stated that the call for him to step down before the Test helped him find the "extra determination" for this innings.

A few days later, reports emerged that Chappell threatened to resign. However, Chappell dismissed these reports by saying, "Neither have I threatened to resign nor do I intend to resign". He then read out a statement which said that the private discussion with Ganguly was "aimed at motivating Sourav for the Bulawayo Test match". He also added that he and Ganguly share a "strong mutual respect going back a long time". Tendulkar commented on the issue saying that the dressing room discussion should have remained private.

Later during the tour, Chappell sent an email to the Board of Control for Cricket in India, which criticised Ganguly as being "mentally and physically unfit" to lead the team. Chappell stated that Ganguly's "negative attitude" would hamper India's development as a unit for the 2007 World Cup and that the injuries suffered by Ganguly are "imaginary". He also accused Ganguly of desperately trying to retain captaincy and that he had "lost the trust and respect of his teammates". The email was leaked, and upon returning to India, both Ganguly and Chappell were summoned to a BCCI board meeting in Mumbai. Before the meeting, Ganguly told a Kolkata-based newspaper, "I will say whatever I want to to the board. I hope the board will give me a chance to explain. You can imagine the character of a person who within hours of a truce goes and writes such an e-mail.". At the conclusion of the meeting, both resolved to work together in the best "interests of Indian cricket".

Dissent amongst the team became public when off spinner Harbhajan Singh earned the ire of cricket authorities by publicly attacking Chappell and defending Ganguly after the team returned to India. Harbhajan claimed that Chappell used "double standards" and instilled "fear and insecurity" into the team. The Punjab Cricket Association called him to explain his actions, but he was not punished after offering an apology. Several members of the Indian team backed Ganguly during this time and were unhappy with the way the matters were handled by Chappell, according to some newspapers. This resulted in a gag order being placed on members of the team.

== Ganguly's ODI omission ==
In October 2005, Ganguly suffered an injury which forced him to be unavailable for the first four ODIs of a seven match ODI series against the touring Sri Lanka. This delayed a definitive decision on whether Ganguly would continue as Indian captain, with Dravid appointed in his absence. After the team took an unbeatable 4–0 series lead, the squad was reviewed for the final three matches. Although changes were made to the team, Ganguly was overlooked, and Dravid continued to lead the team for the rest of the series. At the end of the series which India claimed 6–1, Ganguly was again omitted for the ODI series against South Africa.

When the Indian team arrived at Eden Gardens in Calcutta for the third ODI of the series, an angry public greeted the team bus, chanting and waving banners with anti-Chappell and pro-Ganguly sentiment. Cameras captured a middle finger being displayed to the protestors, attributed to be the finger of Chappell. During the match, the Indian team were booed and the South African batsmen were cheered as they accumulated the runs necessary for a ten-wicket victory.

== Test retention and omission ==
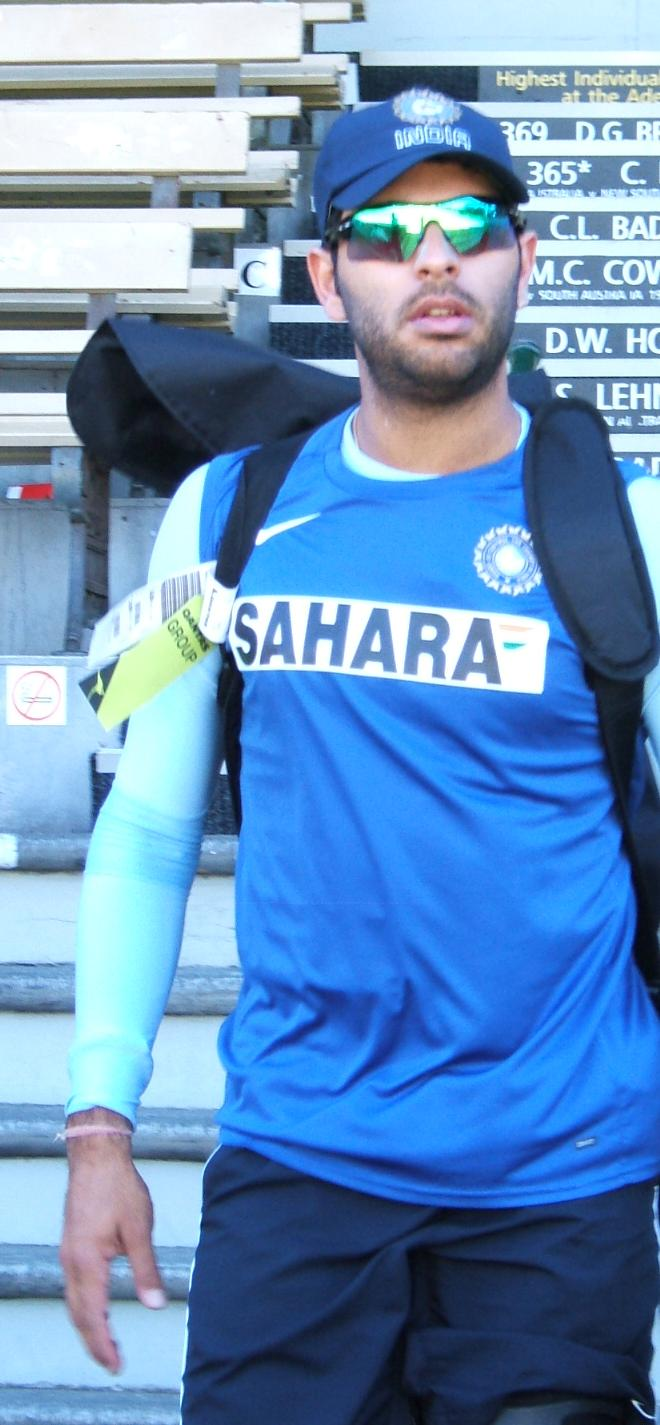
Yuvraj Singh, who was competing with Ganguly for the final batting position.

When the squad for the subsequent Test series against Sri Lanka was announced, Ganguly was included at the expense of paceman Zaheer Khan. At the time, BCCI chairman of selectors Kiran More justified the inclusion of Ganguly, as a "batting all rounder", despite Ganguly's Test bowling average being above 50. The announcement also resolved the captaincy issue, with Dravid named as captain, and Virender Sehwag as his deputy.

Before the start of the Test series, Yashpal Sharma, who was replaced in the national selection panel, accused Chappell of questioning his integrity and interfering with selection of the team. Following this, Chappell remarked that his spat with Ganguly was "blown out of proportion" and went on to say, "He [Yashpal] was frustrated that he lost a job which he obviously wanted to keep. I had no part in him losing his job, but he had to take it out on someone.".

Prior to the first Test in Chennai, debate centred on whether batsman Yuvraj Singh, who had been named man of the series against South Africa, would replace Ganguly in the middle order. Ganguly was retained, in a rain affected match, but did not score highly. The Yuvraj-Ganguly debate was taken from the equation for the second Test at Feroz Shah Kotla in Delhi, when Sehwag was hospitalised with illness, allowing both to play. Ganguly made 39 and 40 in the Test, while Yuvraj recovered from a first innings duck to score an unbeaten 75 in the second to set up a winning victory target. At the end of the Test, More announced that Ganguly had been dropped from the squad, with Mohammad Kaif replacing him. He justified the decision by stating that it would be inappropriate to leave an experienced player like Ganguly out of the team and on the bench, implying that Ganguly and not Yuvraj would have been dropped on the return of Sehwag. As it turned out, Dravid became ill and was forced to withdraw from the Third Test in Ahmedabad, and Kaif played after being selected with the intention of avoiding Ganguly's humiliation as a reserve batsman. Kaif failed to make a large contribution the Third Test, while Yuvraj scored another half century.

Ganguly reportedly cried after being dropped from the team. The decision to drop Ganguly resulted in widespread sympathy and praise for a man who had been previously reviled by the Indian cricket following, resulting in further street protests in Calcutta. This included organised protests by organisations, politicians, including the blockading of rail transport in Bengal. Ganguly's cause was taken up by federal parliamentarians in the Lok Sabha.

Despite being dropped from both ODI and Test teams, at the end of December 2006, Ganguly retained his A-grade BCCI contract, although Yuvraj and Kaif, who had replaced him in the Test team and were established members of the ODI team, remained on a B-grade contract.

== Pakistan tour ==
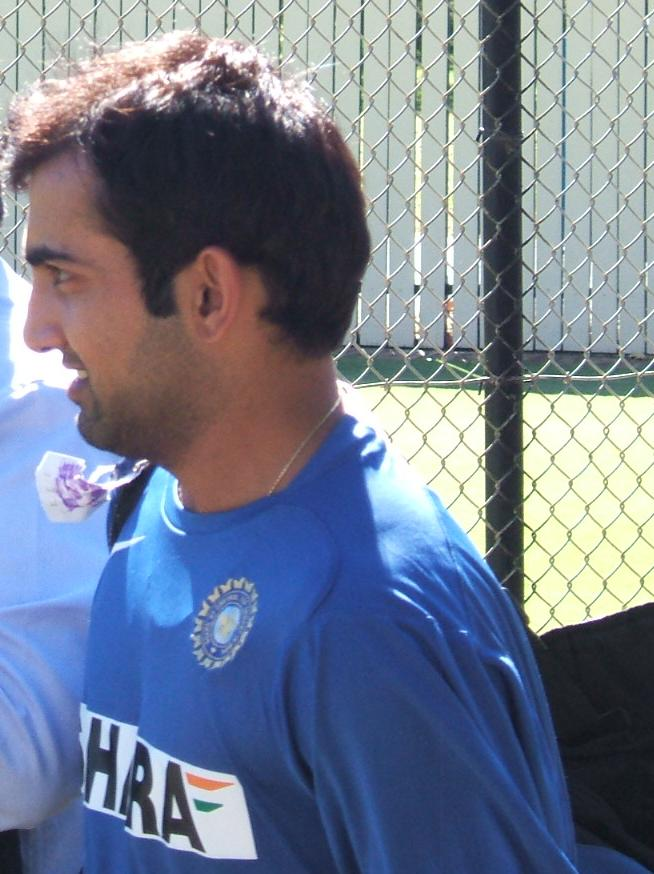
Opening batsmen Gautam Gambhir (pictured) was dropped and Dravid became a makeshift opener to accommodate Ganguly.

With the announcement of the team to tour arch-rivals Pakistan in January 2006, Ganguly was again recalled to the Test team, with Kaif dropped. Leading up to the first Test in Lahore, this still left Ganguly appearing to be out of the team, with Yuvraj having recorded consecutive half-centuries. After a debate with Chappell and Dravid in the middle of the stadium before the start of the Test which was reported by observers to be heated, Ganguly found himself in the team, after specialist opener Gautam Gambhir was dropped to accommodate him, forcing Dravid to play as a makeshift opener along with Sehwag. On a batting-friendly surface, Pakistan amassed 679/7 before declaring. Dravid and Sehwag responded with a 410 run opening stand, just three short of the world Test record set by fellow Indians Vinoo Mankad and Pankaj Roy in 1956. The match ended after Sehwag's dismissal, the last of many interruptions due to bad light. As a result, Ganguly did not have an opportunity with the bat. He was subsequently dropped for the Second Test in Faisalabad as India included an extra bowler on another batting-friendly pitch, with Dravid continuing as a makeshift opener. After the Faisalabad Test ended in another high-scoring draw, the Third Test was held on a green bowler-friendly wicket in Karachi. With six batsmen required, Ganguly was recalled instead of the specialist opener Gambhir. India decided to retain Dravid as the makeshift opener, having scored consecutive centuries in the role. Dravid's success did not continue, failing to pass single figures in both innings. The Indian batsmen were unable to cope with the seaming conditions and lost the Test and series 1–0. Yuvraj top-scored with a century, while Ganguly managed only 34 and 37, getting out to rash strokes in both innings after playing a few good shots. Critics questioned the tenability of the Dravid opening experiment which accommodated Ganguly in the Test team.

Yuvraj further enhanced his standing in the subsequent ODI series, scoring a century and averaging more than 100, being named man of the series for the second consecutive ODI series. Ganguly was not recalled to the ODI team, which continued its recent success with a 4–1 result.

== England series ==
Ganguly's chances of being selected against England in their March 2006 tour of India received a boost when Yuvraj suffered a hamstring injury which ruled him out of the First Test in Nagpur. This opened a vacancy for Ganguly in the middle order, despite the return of Dravid to the middle order after the opening experiment was discarded and specialist opener Wasim Jaffer was selected. Despite Yuvraj publicly backing Ganguly to replace him in the team, the selectors dropped Ganguly from the squad entirely, recalling Kaif and selecting ODI batsman Suresh Raina for his first Test series. Upon Yuvraj's return from injury, he resumed his position in the middle order, replacing Kaif. Ganguly was again overlooked for the ODI series, as the selectors persisted with the core of the team which had helped defeat Pakistan. They guided India to a comprehensive 5–1 win over England.

== West Indies tour ==
Despite an injury to Sachin Tendulkar, Ganguly was again overlooked in favour of Kaif and Raina when the Test squad was announced. This effectively left him outside the top eight Test batsmen in the eyes of the BCCI, and was not selected in the ODI team as the selectors persisted with the squad which had recorded 17 wins and five losses since Dravid's appointment. As the team returned to India at the end of the season in July, Ganguly had been out of the team in both forms of the game for five months.

== South Africa tour ==
Following India's poor batting display in the 2006 ICC Champions Trophy and the ODI series in South Africa, in which they were whitewashed 4–0, Ganguly made his comeback to the Test team. Wasim Jaffer, Zaheer Khan and Anil Kumble had earlier been selected for the one-day squad, despite their recent poor performances. Many saw this as an indictment of coach Greg Chappell's youth-first policy. Coming in at 37/4, Ganguly scored 87 in a tour match against the rest of South Africa, modifying his original batting style and taking a middle-stump guard, resulting in India winning the match. During his first Test innings since his comeback, against South Africa in Johannesburg his score of 51 helped India to victory, marking the first Test match win for the team in South Africa. Though India lost the series, Ganguly accumulated the most runs on the scoring chart. After his successful Test comeback he was recalled for the ODI team, as India played host to West Indies and Sri Lanka in back to back ODI tournaments. In his first ODI innings in almost two years, he scored a matchwinning 98.

== Ganguly's ODI comeback ==
Following Ganguly's topping the batting charts in the test series in South Africa, he was recalled for the ODI series against West Indies, and the one that followed which was against Sri Lanka. He performed well in both series, averaging almost 70 and won the Man of the Series Award against Sri Lanka.

== 2007 World Cup debacle ==
The controversies and tensions surrounding Sourav Ganguly, Rahul Dravid and Greg Chappell came to an end after India's poor performance and early elimination from the 2007 Cricket World Cup. Ganguly was selected as part of the team under the captaincy of Rahul Dravid. India was seen as one of the favorites to win the tournament, but senior BCCI officials indicated that India's performance would decide the future of Greg Chappell' stormy tenure with the Indian team, and determine the credibility of his coaching methods.

India's fortunes were immediately endangered after a stunning defeat to the Bangladesh in its opening group match. Sourav Ganguly top-scored with 66, but he was criticised for scoring at a slow run rate. Although Indian batsmen amassed more than 400 runs for an easy win over the newcomers Bermuda in their second match, Ganguly scoring 87, the media still severely criticised the team leadership and the players. India faced a must-win situation as it faced-off against Sri Lanka in its final group match. Sri Lanka scored more than 250 runs to set a challenging target for the Indian batting order, which failed dramatically. For all practical purposes, India's World Cup campaign ended with its defeat to Sri Lanka, although it was not formally eliminated until Bangladesh achieved its predicted victory over Bermuda in the final group match.

Facing a barrage of criticism and public anger, and lack of support from the BCCI, Greg Chappell resigned as India's coach. After much deliberation, the BCCI decided to retain Rahul Dravid as India's captain for the summer of 2007, but chose not to appoint a high-profile coach for the time being. Former Indian players Venkatesh Prasad and Robin Singh were appointed as specialist bowling and fielding coaches respectively, and former Indian captain Ravi Shastri was temporarily appointed as coach-cum-manager for India's tour of Bangladesh. Shastri was succeeded as manager by Chandu Borde for India's tour of England.

== Aftermath ==
Ganguly emerged with prolific figures in both Test and ODI cricket in the year 2007. He scored 1106 Test runs at an average of 61.44 (with three centuries and four fifties) in 2007 to become the second highest run-scorer in Test matches of that year after Jacques Kallis. He was also the fifth highest run-scorer in 2007 in ODIs, where he scored 1240 runs at an average of 44.28. He formally retired in 2008. In 2008, veteran South African batsman Gary Kirsten was appointed head coach of the national team after a less-publicised selection process. Kirsten brought in Paddy Upton as a mental coach, and Prasad and Singh were retained in their specialist roles.

In November 2007, Chappell alleged that he was a victim of a "racist attack" at the Bhubaneshwar Airport in January 2007 when a fan "whacked him" behind his ear, and accused the BCCI of covering up the issue. He also went on to say, "As I said to the BCCI in a letter, had it been one of the players who was attacked there would have been an outcry, but because it was me no-one seemed to care. The reply came back talking about my racist comments." and added "There was a cover-up. Everyone went into cover-up mode. It was quite obvious it was a serious assault. It wasn't just a push in the back as the media was led to believe. The whole thing was played down. The only phone call I got from the BCCI asked me whether it really happened." In response, BCCI secretary Niranjan Shah told ESPNcricinfo, "No way can it be called racist. We treated the issue just like we would have treated [it with] any other Indian player. I remember calling him and finding out the issue. We also enhanced security and provided adequate protection. The local police also provided us with support." Chappell later downplayed the incident saying his comments came at "an emotional time".

== Reactions ==
In November 2014, in his autobiography Playing It My Way, Tendulkar criticised Chappell, calling him a "ringmaster who imposed his ideas on the players without showing any signs of being concerned about whether they felt comfortable or not". He said that, "His attitude to Sourav was astonishing. Chappell is on record as saying that he may have got the job because of Sourav but that did not mean he was going to do favours to Sourav for the rest of his life. Frankly, Sourav is one of the best cricketers India has produced and he did not need favours from Chappell to be part of the team". Tendulkar also alleged that months before the 2007 World Cup, Chappell came to Tendulkar's house and asked Tendulkar to take over India captaincy saying "together, we could control Indian cricket for years".

Tendulkar's allegations were supported by former teammates such as Zaheer Khan, Harbhajan Singh and V. V. S. Laxman. Zaheer called Chappell a "control freak" and said, "After he was appointed the coach of the Indian team, he once came upto me and told "Zaheer, you will not be playing for India till I remain the coach". He also added that the two-year term under Chappell was "easily the worst and darkest phase" that he could remember. Harbhajan said, "Chappell destroyed Indian cricket to such an extent that it required at least 3 years to again get back on track. The worst part was some players in that team, who sucked upto the coach and would supply selective misinformation creating bigger rifts". He also talked about the email leak, "Sourav was batting out there in the middle and this man was typing a critical e-mail against Sourav, sitting right there in that dressing room. He had no interest in the proceedings of the match. There were seven guys that he wanted to get rid of. Sourav was his primary target followed by myself, Virender Sehwag, Ashish Nehra, Zaheer Khan and Yuvraj Singh". Laxman was also critical of Chappell in saying that Chappell took Indian cricket "backwards" during his coaching tenure. Laxman also recalled an incident from 2006, "This happened in 2006 at the Wankhede Stadium when India played versus England. Yuvraj Singh was picked ahead of me. We were going to the West Indies for a four-Test series after that and he asked me if I would open. I mentioned in 2000 I had decided I would not open anymore after it didn't work for me in the first four years. I was consistent in the middle order since 2000. Chappell asked me my age and said – Don't you think 31 is too young an age to sit at home? I was astonished to hear this. I had a very good run under him. I was the second highest run scorer under him."

In 2015, Mohammad Kaif stated, "Chappell questioned my fielding technique and it left me so confused that I dropped a catch in the very next game. Chappell created an atmosphere where the players were backbiting about each other rather than focusing on their performances." In 2017, when he announced his retirement Ashish Nehra recalled, "I didn't play much under Greg Chappell save two series in 2005. I knew biryani would turn into khichdi under Greg." In 2018, Virender Sehwag revealed that he was the one who had informed Ganguly of Chappell's email. In an earlier interview, Sehwag claimed that, "The thing with Chappell was that whatever you shared with him, it was promptly disclosed to media and selectors. He talked and that hurt the trust. I wasn't comfortable with him." In another interview Sehwag had stated that Chappell's man-management skills were "absolutely nil". In June 2020, Harbhajan Singh in conversation with Aakash Chopra claimed that Greg Chappell had a divide and rule policy and said, "2007 50-over World Cup has to be the lowest point of my career. I thought we are going through such a difficult time and I also thought that maybe it is not the right time to play for India, wrong people were at the helm of Indian cricket. Who is Greg Chappell and what is he trying to do. Greg Chappell had a divide and rule policy, he used to do such things". During all this controversy, the team members continued to support Ganguly and offered private words of sympathy to him.
