= Pakistani cricket team in Australia in 2004–05 =

	Pakistan	Australia
- Dates: 7 December 2004 – 6 February 2005
Captains	Inzamam-ul-Haq; Yousuf Youhana (2 Tests)	Ricky Ponting

Test series
- Result: Australia won the 3-match series 3–0
Most runs	Younis Khan (259)	Ricky Ponting (403)
Most wickets	Danish Kaneria (15)	Glenn McGrath (17)
- Player of the series: Damien Martyn (Aus)

The Pakistan national cricket team toured Australia in the 2004–05 season and played three Test matches against Australia. Australia won the series 3–0.

== Tour matches ==
=== 50 overs: Chairman's XI v Pakistanis ===
7 December 2004
Scorecard

Pakistanis; 256/9 (50 overs)	v	Cricket Australia Chairman's XI; 213 (45.2 overs)
Salman Butt 115 (135); Michael Hussey 3/28 (4 overs)		Chris Rogers 61 (59); Rana Naved-ul-Hasan 3/36 (10 overs)

Pakistanis won by 43 runs
Lilac Hill, Perth
Umpires: Bruce Bennett (Aus) and Ian Lock (Aus)

- Pakistanis won the toss and elected to bat

=== First-class: Western Australia v Pakistanis ===
9–11 December 2004
Scorecard

Pakistanis	v	Western Australia
262 (82.1 overs); Abdul Razzaq 83* (198); Brett Dorey 3/38 (16 overs)		404/9 (92 overs); Michael Hussey 124 (203); Danish Kaneria 3/133 (34 overs)
174 (54.2 overs); Salman Butt 47 (77); Brett Dorey 5/41 (19.2 overs)		34/0 (4.5 overs); Justin Langer 14 (19); Abdul Razzaq 0/11 (2 overs)

Western Australia won by 10 wickets
WACA Ground, Perth
Umpires: Jeff Brookes (Aus) and Andrew Craig (Aus)

- Pakistanis won the toss and elected to field.

=== 50 overs: Australia A v Pakistanis ===
12 January 2005
Scorecard

Pakistanis; 279/8 (50 overs)	v	Australia A 266 (48.4 overs)
Abdul Razzaq 89 (61); Shaun Tait 2/49 (10 overs)		Brad Haddin 129 (124); Rana Naved-ul-Hasan 3/42 (9.4 overs)

Pakistanis won by 13 runs
Adelaide Oval, Adelaide
Umpires: Ian Lock (Aus) and Bruce Oxenford (Aus)

- Australia A won the toss and elected to field.

=== Twenty20: Australia A v Pakistanis ===
13 January 2005
Scorecard

Australia A 185/2 (20 overs)	v	Pakistanis; 129/7 (20 overs)
Cameron White 58* (38); Shoaib Akhtar 2/37 (4 overs)		Taufeeq Umar 31 (20); Damien Wright 2/27 (4 overs)

Australia A won by 56 runs
Adelaide Oval, Adelaide
Umpires: Ian Lock (Aus) and Bruce Oxenford (Aus)

- Australia A won the toss and elected to bat.

=== 50 overs: Prime Minister's XI v Pakistanis ===
25 January 2005
Scorecard

Prime Minister's XI; 191 (46.4 overs)	v	Pakistanis; 192/5 (42.5 overs)
Chris Rogers 46; Shoaib Malik 3/29 (10 overs)		Younis Khan 62*; Ben Edmondson 3/38 (9 overs)

Pakistanis won by 5 wickets (with 43 balls remaining)
Manuka Oval, Canberra
Umpires: Andrew Shelley (Aus) and John Smeaton (Aus)
Player of the match: Younis Khan (Pakistanis)

- Pakistanis won the toss and elected to bat.

== Test series ==
=== 1st Test ===
16–19 December 2004
Scorecard

Australia	v	Pakistan
381 (90.5 overs); Justin Langer 191 (280); Shoaib Akhtar 5/99 (22 overs)		179 (77.3 overs); Younis Khan 42 (99); Michael Kasprowicz 5/30 (16.3 overs)
361/5d (85.2 overs); Damien Martyn 100* (121); Danish Kaneria 2/130 (32 overs)		72 (31.3 overs); Yousuf Youhana 27 (31); Glenn McGrath 8/24 (16 overs)

Australia won by 491 runs
WACA Ground, Perth
Umpires: Billy Bowden (NZ) and Rudi Koertzen (SA)
Player of the match: Justin Langer (Aus)

- Pakistan won the toss and elected to field.
- Mohammad Khalil (Pak) made his Test debut.
- Justin Langer alone (288) outscored the entire Pakistani team in both innings.

=== 2nd Test ===
26–29 December 2004
Scorecard

Pakistan	v	Australia
341 (107.3 overs); Yousuf Youhana 111 (134); Jason Gillespie 3/77 (26 overs)		379 (99.3 overs); Damien Martyn 142 (245); Shoaib Akhtar 5/109 (27 overs)
163 (64.2 overs); Shoaib Malik 41 (89); Glenn McGrath 4/35 (11.2 overs)		127/1 (27.5 overs); Ricky Ponting 62* (91); Mohammad Sami 1/22 (5 overs)

Australia won by 9 wickets
Melbourne Cricket Ground, Melbourne
Umpires: Rudi Koertzen (SA) and Jeremy Lloyds (Eng)
Player of the match: Damien Martyn (Aus)

- Pakistan won the toss and elected to bat.

=== 3rd Test ===
2–5 January 2005
Scorecard

Pakistan	v	Australia
304 (86.4 overs); Salman Butt 101 (185); Stuart MacGill 5/87 (22 overs)		568 (133.3 overs); Ricky Ponting 207 (332); Danish Kaneria 7/188 (49.3 overs)
325 (89.2 overs); Asim Kamal 87 (143); Shane Warne 4/111 (26 overs)		62/1 (9.3 overs); Justin Langer 34 (30); Danish Kaneria 1/16 (2.3 overs)

Australia won by 9 wickets
Sydney Cricket Ground, Sydney
Umpires: Billy Bowden (NZ) and David Shepherd (Eng)
Player of the match: Stuart MacGill (Aus)

- Pakistan won the toss and elected to bat.
- Shane Watson (Aus) and Mohammad Asif (Pak) made their Test debuts.

== VB Series ==
During Pakistan's tour they competed in a triangular series with Australia and West Indies. Pakistan finished second in the round robin stage by winning three and losing three matches, but they lost 2–0 to Australia in the best-of-three final.

Pos	Team	Pld	W	NR/T	L	BP	Pts	NRR
1	Australia	6	4	1	1	3	27	+1.082
2	Pakistan	6	3	0	3	2	17	−0.295
3	West Indies	6	1	1	4	2	10	−0.718

== External sources ==
- ESPNCricinfo – Pakistan in Australia, 2004–2005
- CricketArchive
