= Faisal Iqbal (cricketer) =

Pakistani cricket coach and former cricketer

Faisal Iqbal فیصل اقبال
Personal information
- Born: 30 December 1981 (age 44); Karachi, Sindh, Pakistan
- Batting: Right-handed
- Bowling: Right-arm off spin
- Relatives: Javed Miandad (uncle)

International information
- National side: Pakistan (2000–2010)
- Test debut (cap 164): 8 March 2001 v New Zealand
- Last Test: 3 January 2010 v Australia
- ODI debut (cap 132): 19 February 2000 v Sri Lanka
- Last ODI: 13 December 2006 v West Indies

Career statistics
Competition	Test	ODI
Matches	26	18
Runs scored	1,124	314
Batting average	26.76	22.42
100s/50s	1/8	1/0
Top score	139	100*
Balls bowled	6	18
Wickets	0	0
Bowling average	–	–
5 wickets in innings	–	–
10 wickets in match	–	–
Best bowling	–	–
Catches/stumpings	22/–	3/–
- Source: Cricinfo, 24 December 2016

Faisal Iqbal (Urdu: فیصل اقبال; born 30 December 1981) is a Pakistani cricket coach and former cricketer who played for the Pakistan national cricket team in Tests and One Day Internationals.

Previously, he played for Karachi Region, Pakistan International Airlines (PIA), Pakistan National Shipping Corporation, Sindh Dolphins and Pakistan A in first class, List A and T20 cricket.

He is now a coach and also appears as an expert cricket analyst on different TV channels.

== Early life and family ==
Iqbal is the nephew of Pakistan cricketing great Javed Miandad.

His wife is a South African national.

== Cricket career ==
=== Domestic career ===
Iqbal was part of the PIA team which reached the finals of Quaid-e-Azam Trophy Division One held at Karachi in January 2011. He was the leading run-scorer for Karachi Whites in the 2017–18 Quaid-e-Azam Trophy, with 413 runs in seven matches.

=== International career ===
Iqbal's first ODI was against Sri Lanka, a game in which the whole Pakistani batting line-up capitulated. He showed that he preferred to take his time to get settled on the crease. Because of that, the selectors chose to give him his first Test match start soon after. He started his International Test career during Pakistan's tour of New Zealand where he played multiple strong innings in which he displayed his range of strokes and the ability to play off some hostile bowling. Iqbal was a prolific junior-level scorer. He played two Tests in South Africa in 2002–03 but was dropped after not performing well. Upon returning to Test cricket after a two-year hiatus, he scored his maiden Test century against India to help Pakistan win the 2005–06 Test series in the final Test in Karachi. He proved his doubters wrong by playing some solid innings especially an impressive innings against Australia which turned out to be in vain as it did not prevent a loss. He continued on for a few more tours but was ultimately dropped due to a lean period where he did not contribute significantly with the bat. He continued to play domestic cricket though and was recalled to the side after injuries hit some of the other players.

He was never cut out to be an ODI player, never crossing 150 runs in a calendar year. He played his last ODI against the West Indies in 2006. His test career however, is a different story. Since he made his debut in 2001, he played every year until 2010 with 2006 being the most fruitful in terms of runs scored. He made over 300 runs in 12 innings, but the team failed to win more than 2 matches (4 innings). Since then he has been in and out of the side, playing the odd match or two. He played his last game in 2010 in a losing effort against the Australians. He made a Test comeback in 2012 to 2013 with extraordinary first class season with 5 first class and 1 List A century, but could not able to get into playing X1 after doing 12th man duties on Sri Lanka, South Africa and Zimbabwe tours and later dropped without playing from Test squad and Central contract.

== Coaching career ==
Since his retirement, and after doing coaching courses from England, he has become a coach, for example serving as batting coach and consultant to the Karachi Kings in previous seasons of the PSL.

As of 2020, he was the head coach of the Balochistan team.

In 2022, he was appointed head coach to the Northern Warriors squad for the sixth season of the Abu Dhabi T10.
