= Pakistani cricket team in India in 2004–05 =

Cricket team

	India	Pakistan
- Dates: 8 March – 17 April 2005
Captains	Sourav Ganguly (Note: Rahul Dravid captained India for the last two ODI matches.)	Inzamam-ul-Haq

Test series
- Result: 3-match series drawn 1–1
Most runs	Virender Sehwag (544)	Younis Khan (508)
Most wickets	Anil Kumble (11)	Danish Kaneria (19)
- Player of the series: Virender Sehwag (Ind)

One Day International series
- Results: Pakistan won the 6-match series 4–2
Most runs	Rahul Dravid (308)	Shoaib Malik (269)
Most wickets	Ashish Nehra (11)	Naved-ul-Hasan (15)
- Player of the series: Naved-ul-Hasan (Pak)

The Pakistani cricket team toured India from 8 March to 17 April 2005. The tour consisted of six One Day Internationals (ODIs) and three Tests matches. The Test series was drawn 1–1 while Pakistan won the ODI series 4–2.

== 2004–05 BCCI Platinum Jubilee Match ==
=== Only ODI ===
13 November 2004
Scorecard

India; 292/6 (50 overs)	v	Pakistan; 293/4 (49 overs)
Yuvraj Singh 78 (62); Shahid Afridi 2/29 (10 overs)		Salman Butt 108* (130); Ashish Nehra 2/65 (10 overs)

Pakistan won by 6 wickets
Eden Gardens, Kolkata
Umpires: Krishna Hariharan (Ind) and Simon Taufel (Aus)
Player of the match: Salman Butt (Pak)

- India won the toss and elected to bat.

== Squads ==
Tests		ODIs	
India	Pakistan	India	Pakistan
Sourav Ganguly (c); Rahul Dravid (vc); Virender Sehwag; Gautam Gambhir; Sachin Tendulkar; VVS Laxman; Yuvraj Singh; Dinesh Karthik (wk); Anil Kumble; Harbhajan Singh; Zaheer Khan; Irfan Pathan; Ashish Nehra; Lakshmipathy Balaji	Inzamam-ul-Haq (c); Younis Khan (vc); Salman Butt; Taufeeq Umar; Yasir Hameed; Shahid Afridi; Imran Farhat; Asim Kamal; Kamran Akmal (wk); Shoaib Malik; Danish Kaneria; Abdul Razzaq; Mohammad Khalil; Arshad Khan; Mohammad Sami; Naved-ul-Hasan; Mohammad Yousuf	Sourav Ganguly (c); Rahul Dravid (vc); Virender Sehwag; Sachin Tendulkar; Yuvraj Singh; Mohammad Kaif; MS Dhoni (wk); Dinesh Mongia; Murali Kartik; Zaheer Khan; Irfan Pathan; Ashish Nehra; Ajit Agarkar; Lakshmipathy Balaji	Inzamam-ul-Haq (c); Younis Khan (vc); Salman Butt; Mohammad Hafeez; Mohammad Yousuf; Shahid Afridi; Imran Farhat; Asim Kamal; Kamran Akmal (wk); Shoaib Malik; Shahid Nazir; Rao Iftikhar Anjum; Shabbir Ahmed; Danish Kaneria; Abdul Razzaq; Arshad Khan; Mohammad Sami; Naved-ul-Hasan

== Tour Matches ==
=== Three-day: Indian Board President's XI v Pakistan ===
3–5 March 2005
Scorecard

Pakistan	v	(India) Indian Board President's XI
273 ( 67.4 overs); Abdul Razzaq 63 (82); Venugopal Rao 3/48 (9 Overs)		120/1 (34 overs); Dheeraj Jadhav 49* (113); Rana Naved-ul-Hasan 1/17 (8 Overs)

Match Drawn
HPCA Stadium, Dharamsala
Umpires: Sameer Bandekar and Sudhir Asnani

- Pakistan won the toss and elected to bat.
- The start of play on day 1 was delayed due to bad light before it was stopped after 2.4 overs of play due to heavy rain.
- Bad light on day 2 led to premature close of play, at the afternoon session.
- Bad light and rain restricted play to on 45 minutes on day 3.

=== Limited overs: India A v Pakistan ===
30 March 2005
Scorecard

India A 189/7 (45 overs)	v	Pakistan; 190/2 (41 overs)
Suresh Raina 55 (65); Rana Naved-ul-Hasan 2/42 (9 overs)		Shoaib Malik 81* (78); Ranadeb Bose 1/41 (8 overs)

Pakistan won by 8 wickets
Rajiv Gandhi International Cricket Stadium, Hyderabad
Umpires: Balwant Sharma and Rajan Seth
Player of the match: Shoaib Malik (Pakistan)

- Pakistan won the toss and elected to field.

== Test series ==
=== 1st Test ===
8–12 March 2005
Scorecard

Pakistan	v	India
312 (86.4 overs); Asim Kamal 91 (163); Lakshmipathy Balaji 5/76 (20.4 overs)		516 (147.4 overs); Virender Sehwag 173 (244); Danish Kaneria 6/76 (53.4 overs)
496/9d (144 overs); Kamran Akmal 109 (154); Lakshmipathy Balaji 4/160 (54 overs)		85/1 (17 overs); Virender Sehwag 36* (54); Younis Khan 1/24 (2 overs)

Match drawn
Punjab Cricket Association Stadium, Mohali
Umpires: Darrell Hair (Aus) and Rudi Koertzen (SA)
Player of the match: Kamran Akmal (Pak)

- India won the toss and elected to field.

=== 2nd Test ===
16–20 March 2005
Scorecard

India	v	Pakistan
407 (111.1 overs); Rahul Dravid 110 (222); Abdul Razzaq 3/62 (22.1 overs)		393 (113.1 overs); Younis Khan 147 (258); Anil Kumble 3/98 (37.1 overs)
407/9d (104 overs); Rahul Dravid 135 (283); Abdul Razzaq 3/80 (19 overs)		226 (91.3 overs); Shahid Afridi 59 (59); Anil Kumble 7/63 (38 overs)

India won by 195 runs
Eden Gardens, Kolkata
Umpires: Steve Bucknor (WI) and Darrell Hair (Aus)
Player of the match: Rahul Dravid (Ind)

- India won the toss and elected to bat.

=== 3rd Test ===
24–28 March 2005
Scorecard

Pakistan	v	India
570 (167.5 overs); Younis Khan 267 (504); Harbhajan Singh 6/152 (51.5 overs)		449 (128.4 overs); Virender Sehwag 201 (262); Danish Kaneria 5/127 (39 overs)
261/2d (50 overs); Younis Khan 84 (98); Sachin Tendulkar 1/62 (15 overs)		214 (90 overs); Gautam Gambhir 52 (124); Shahid Afridi 3/13 (17 overs)

Pakistan won by 168 runs
M. Chinnaswamy Stadium, Bangalore
Umpires: Billy Bowden (NZ) and Simon Taufel (Aus)
Player of the match: Younis Khan (Pak)

- Pakistan won the toss and elected to bat.
- Match start delayed by bad weather.

== ODI series ==
=== 1st ODI ===
2 April 2005
Scorecard

India; 281/8 (50 overs)	v	Pakistan; 194 (45.2 overs)
Virender Sehwag 108 (95); Arshad Khan 4/33 (6 overs)		Mohammad Hafeez 42 (75); Sachin Tendulkar 5/50 (10 overs)

India won by 87 runs
Jawaharlal Nehru Stadium, Kochi
Umpires: Billy Bowden (NZL) and Arani Jayaprakash (Ind)
Player of the match: Virender Sehwag (Ind)

- India won the toss and elected to bat.

=== 2nd ODI ===
5 April 2005
Scorecard

India; 356/9 (50 overs)	v	Pakistan; 298 (44.1 overs)
MS Dhoni 148 (123); Naved-ul-Hasan 3/54 (10 overs)		Abdul Razzaq 88 (93); Ashish Nehra 4/72 (10 overs)

India won by 58 runs
ACA-VDCA Stadium, Vishakhapatnam
Umpires: Billy Bowden (NZ) and Arani Jayaprakash (Ind)
Player of the match: MS Dhoni (Ind)

- India won the toss and elected to bat.
- MS Dhoni (Ind) scored his first century in ODIs.

=== 3rd ODI ===
9 April 2005
Scorecard

Pakistan; 319/9 (50 overs)	v	India; 213 (41.4 overs)
Salman Butt 101 (116); Ashish Nehra 3/57 (10 overs)		Irfan Pathan 64 (80); Naved-ul-Hasan 6/27 (8.4 overs)

Pakistan won by 106 runs
Keenan Stadium, Jamshedpur
Umpires: Billy Bowden (NZL) and Krishna Hariharan (Ind)
Player of the match: Naved-ul-Hasan (Pak)

- Pakistan won the toss and elected to bat.

=== 4th ODI ===
12 April 2005
Scorecard

India; 315/6 (48 overs)	v	Pakistan; 319/7 (48 overs)
Sachin Tendulkar 123 (130); Shoaib Malik 3/67 (9 overs)		Shoaib Malik 65 (65); Murali Kartik 2/54(10 overs)

Pakistan won by 3 wickets
Sardar Patel Stadium, Ahmedabad
Umpires: Krishna Hariharan (Ind) and Rudi Koertzen (SA)
Player of the match: Inzamam-ul-Haq (Pak)

- India won the toss and elected to bat.

=== 5th ODI ===
15 April 2005
Scorecard

India; 249/6 (50 overs)	v	Pakistan; 252/5 (42.1 overs)
Rahul Dravid 86 (115); Naved-ul-Hasan 3/35 (10 overs)		Shahid Afridi 102 (46); Anil Kumble 2/54 (10 overs)

Pakistan won by 5 wickets
Green Park Stadium, Kanpur
Umpires: Krishna Hariharan (Ind) and Rudi Koertzen (SA)
Player of the match: Shahid Afridi (Pak)

- India won the toss and elected to bat.
- It was the 100th ODI between India and Pakistan. Pakistan became first team to play 100 or more matches against three countries.
- Rahul Dravid (Ind) scored his 8,000th run in ODIs.
- Shahid Afridi's (Pak) century was the fastest against India and joint-second fastest overall, in terms of balls faced (45).
- Shahid Afridi became the first batsman to hit 200 sixes in ODIs.

=== 6th ODI ===
17 April 2005
Scorecard

Pakistan; 303/6 (50 overs)	v	India; 144 (37 overs)
Shoaib Malik 72 (87); Ajit Agarkar 3/58 (9 overs)		MS Dhoni 24 (38); Arshad Khan 3/33 (10 overs)

Pakistan won by 159 runs
Feroz Shah Kotla Ground, Delhi
Umpires: Arani Jayaprakash (Ind) and Rudi Koertzen (SA)
Player of the match: Shoaib Malik (Pak)

- Pakistan won the toss and elected to bat.
