= South African cricket team in India in 2005–06 =

	India	South Africa
- Dates: 14 November 2005 – 28 November 2005
Captains	Graeme Smith	Rahul Dravid

One Day International series
- Results: 5-match series drawn 2–2
Most runs	Graeme Smith (209)	Yuvraj Singh (259)
Most wickets	Shaun Pollock (7)	Irfan Pathan (6)
- Player of the series: Yuvraj Singh (Ind)

The South African cricket team visited India for cricket matches in the 2005–06 season. All the matches were one-day games, with five One Day Internationals and a tour match against a team from Hyderabad. Both sides were coming off series wins, India beating Sri Lanka 6–1 at home while South Africa had enjoyed a 5–0 win over New Zealand. Before the series, the BBC Sport website had a preview which argued that India and South Africa were both "more serious challengers to Australia's crown" as defending World Champions, and that the crowds "could be in for some seriously good cricket"

It was a close series, at any rate – South Africa took the lead twice in the series, but couldn't hold on, and with the third ODI at M. A. Chidambaram Stadium rained off, the series was drawn 2–2. The Man of the Series award was also shared, between Graeme Smith of South Africa and Yuvraj Singh of India, who topped the batting averages of their teams with 209 runs. On the bowling side, Shaun Pollock contributed with seven wickets and nine maiden overs, but went for 5.5 an over in the final ODI, when India were set 222 runs to win in 50 overs.

== Squads ==
India	South Africa
Rahul Dravid (c); Virender Sehwag (vc); Sachin Tendulkar; Gautam Gambhir; Yuvraj Singh; Mohammad Kaif; MS Dhoni (wk); Suresh Raina; Harbhajan Singh; Jai Prakash Yadav; Murali Kartik; Ajit Agarkar; Irfan Pathan; RP Singh; S. Sreesanth	Graeme Smith (c); Jacques Kallis (vc); Mark Boucher (wk); Johan Botha; AB de Villiers; Andrew Hall; Justin Kemp; Charl Langeveldt; Albie Morkel; Shaun Pollock; André Nel; Makhaya Ntini; Justin Ontong; Robin Peterson; Ashwell Prince

== ODI series ==
=== 1st ODI ===
16 November 2005
Scorecard

India; 249/9 (50 overs)	v	South Africa; 252/5 (48.5 overs)
Yuvraj Singh 103 (122); Ajit Agarkar 2/55 (9.5 overs)		Jacques Kallis 68 (97); Shaun Pollock 2/37 (10 overs)

South Africa won by 5 wickets
Vishaka Stadium, Hyderabad
Umpires: Krishna Hariharan (Ind) and Daryl Harper (Aus)
Player of the match: Yuvraj Singh (Ind)

- South Africa won the toss and elected to field.
- It was the first international match played in this venue.
- Johan Botha (SA) made his debut in ODIs.
- This was South Africa's 20th successive unbeaten ODI match.

=== 2nd ODI ===
19 November 2005 (D/N)
Scorecard

South Africa; 169/9 (50 overs)	v	India; 171/4 (35.4 overs)
Andrew Hall 32 (43); Shaun Pollock 1/10 (6 overs)		Virender Sehwag 77 (62); Irfan Pathan 3/23 (6 overs)

India won by 6 wickets
M. Chinnaswamy Stadium, Bangalore
Umpires: Daryl Harper (Aus) and Arani Jayaprakash (Ind)
Player of the match: Irfan Pathan (Ind)

- India won the toss and elected to field.

=== Third ODI ===
22 November 2005 (D/N)

India; Did not bat	v	South Africa; Did not bat

No result
M. A. Chidambaram Stadium, Chennai

- No toss made.
- Match abandoned due to rain

=== Fourth ODI ===
25 November 2005 (D/N)
Scorecard

India; 188 (45.5 overs)	v	South Africa; 189/0 (35.5 overs)
Yuvraj Singh 53 (78); Shaun Pollock 3/25 (10 overs)		Graeme Smith 134* (124); Harbhajan Singh 0/37 (10 overs)

South Africa won by 10 wickets
Eden Gardens, Kolkata
Umpires: Daryl Harper (Aus) and Arani Jayaprakash (Ind)
Player of the match: Graeme Smith (SA)

- South Africa won the toss and elected to field.

A huge Bengali crowd showed support for South Africa in this match. They were angry over Greg Chappell's decision to exclude Saurav Ganguly leading to Chappell–Ganguly controversy. Later Greg allegedly showed midfinger to the crowd.

=== Fifth ODI ===
28 November 2005 (D/N)
Scorecard

South Africa; 221/6 (50 overs)	v	India; 224/5 (47.3 overs)
Jacques Kallis 91 (146); Irfan Pathan 3/20 (8 overs)		Rahul Dravid 78* (106); Andre Nel 2/35 (10 overs)

India won by 5 wickets
Wankhede Stadium, Mumbai
Umpires: Daryl Harper (Aus) and Krishna Hariharan (Ind)
Player of the match: Rahul Dravid (Ind)

- India won the toss and elected to field.
