= Abdul Razzaq (cricketer) =

Pakistan cricketer and coach (born 1979)

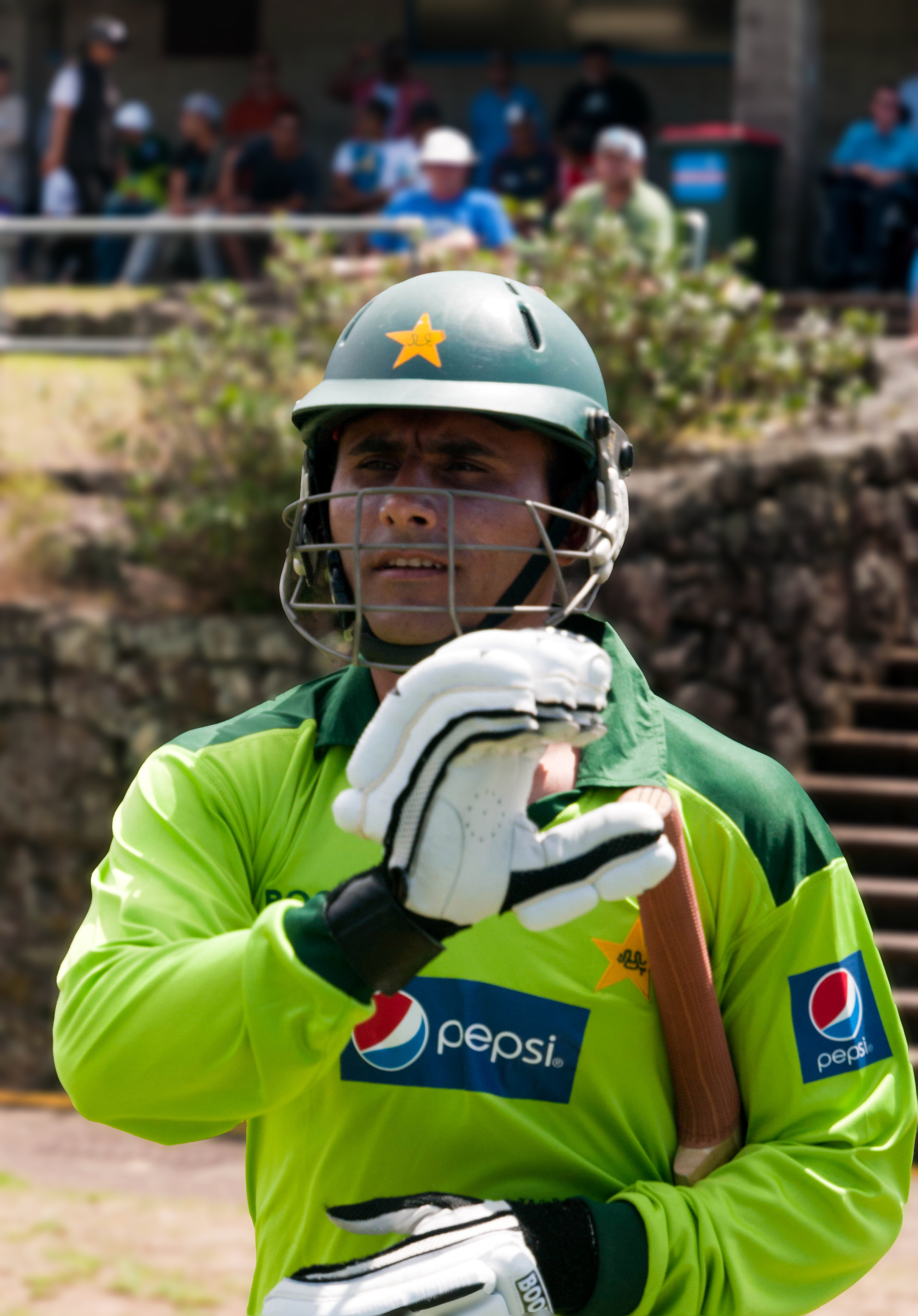

Personal information
- Born: 2 December 1979 (age 46); Lahore, Punjab, Pakistan
- Height: 5 ft 11 in (180 cm)
- Batting: Right-handed
- Bowling: Right-arm fast-medium
- Role: All-rounder

International information
- National side: Pakistan (1996–2013)
- Test debut (cap 157): 5 November 1999 v Australia
- Last Test: 1 December 2006 v West Indies
- ODI debut (cap 111): 1 November 1996 v Zimbabwe
- Last ODI: 18 November 2011 v Sri Lanka
- T20I debut (cap 1): 28 August 2006 v England
- Last T20I: 15 November 2013 v South Africa

Domestic team information
- Years: Team
- 1996–2007: Lahore
- 1997–1999: Khan Research Laboratories
- 2001–2002: Pakistan International Airlines
- 2002–2003: Middlesex
- 2003–2004: Zarai
- 2004–: Lahore Lions
- 2007: Worcestershire
- 2007–2009: Hyderabad Heroes
- 2008: Surrey
- 2010: Hampshire
- 2010: Sialkot Stallions
- 2011: Leicestershire
- 2011–2012: Melbourne Renegades
- 2012–2013: Wayamba United
- 2016: Lahore Qalandars

Career statistics
Competition	Test	ODI	T20I	FC
Matches	46	265	32	123
Runs scored	1,946	5,080	393	5,371
Batting average	28.61	29.70	20.68	32.55
100s/50s	3/7	3/23	0/0	8/29
Top score	134	112	46*	203*
Balls bowled	7,008	10,941	339	19,206
Wickets	100	269	20	355
Bowling average	36.94	31.83	19.75	31.42
5 wickets in innings	1	3	0	13
10 wickets in match	0	0	0	2
Best bowling	5/35	6/35	3/13	7/51
Catches/stumpings	15/–	35/–	2/–	33/–
Medal record
Men's Cricket
Representing Pakistan
ICC Cricket World Cup
Runner-up	1999 England-Wales -Ireland-Scotland-Netherlands
ICC T20 World Cup
Winner	2009 England
ACC Asia Cup
Winner	2000 Bangladesh
- Source: ESPNcricinfo, 12 March 2023

Abdul Razzaq (Punjabi, Urdu: عبدُالرّزاق; born 2 December 1979) is a Pakistani cricket coach and former cricketer, who played all formats of the game. Known as a gifted all-rounder, he was a right-arm fast-medium bowler and a right-handed batsman. He emerged in international cricket in 1996 with his One Day International debut against Zimbabwe at his home ground in Gaddafi Stadium, Lahore; just one month before his seventeenth birthday. He was part of the Pakistan Cricket squad that won the ICC World Twenty20 2009. He was a part of the Pakistan squad which finished as runners-up at the 1999 Cricket World Cup. He played 265 ODIs and 46 Tests.

In 2018, at the age of 38, Abdul Razzaq announced that he would make a comeback at the domestic circuit level to play first-class cricket again after having short stints as a coach for few domestic teams in Pakistan since his international retirement in 2013.

== Early and personal life ==
Abdul Razzaq was born in Shahdara Bagh, a suburb on the outskirts of Lahore, Punjab, known for its Mughal architecture.

His son Ali Razzaq is also a cricketer.

== Cricket career ==
=== Youth career ===
Inspired by Wasim Akram to take up fast bowling, Razzaq's breakthrough came on Pakistan Under-19s’ 1996 tour of the West Indies, where he took 17 wickets and contributed with the bat, cementing his rise to Pakistan's senior side.

=== International career ===
==== Early career ====
Abdul Razzaq made his One Day International debut in November 1996, against Zimbabwe, but had to wait just over three years to make his Test cricket debut for Pakistan, eventually doing so against Australia in Brisbane in November 1999. In the 1999–2000 Carlton and United Series, he rose to fame and was named man of the series for his all round performance. During a match in Hobart against India, Abdul Razzaq scored a half century and took five wickets. In the same tournament, he hit former Australian fast bowler, Glenn McGrath for 5 fours, which totalled to 20 runs in one over. In total, during the tournament, he scored 225 runs at 37.5 with a top score of 70 not out, and got 14 wickets at 20.78 with a best return of 5-48.

Abdul Razzaq also performed well with the ball, his most noticeable stint was in the Coca-Cola Champions Trophy 1999 against Sri Lanka in Sharjah, October 1999. Pakistan were bowled out for 196, with Abdul Razzaq remaining not out on 7. However, Abdul Razzaq proved to be more than capable with his all round skills as he took his first five-wicket haul, dismissing Romesh Kaluwitharana, Mahela Jayawardene, Suresh Perera, Chaminda Vaas and Chamara Silva to finish with match figures of 5/31, meaning that Sri Lanka were also bowled out for 196 resulting in a tied match, having once been at 157/2. Former captain Wasim Akram praised Abdul Razzaq's ability with the ball, citing that he was emerging to be one of the best all rounders in the world. Abdul Razzaq's astonishing nine-ball spell, which he took four for nought helped snatch a tie from what seemed a certain Sri Lankan victory, finishing as the man of the match for his performance.

==== 1999 Cricket World Cup ====
Abdul Razzaq became a regular member of his national side during the 1999 world cup held in England. During the event, he got the attention of selectors as he performed well both with the ball and bat. His brilliant performance with the bat came in the group match against Australia, where he went on to score his first half century making 60 runs in a long and stable partnership with Inzamam-ul-Haq, which helped Pakistan reach a defendable target of 275. Pakistan went on to win the match by ten runs and as a result qualified for the Super Six stage. With the ball, he made a brilliant performance against the tough West Indies national cricket team by taking three wickets for 32 runs having three maiden overs, which proved decisive for Pakistan at Bristol.

==== 2000 Carlton and United Series ====
Abdul Razzaq's other impressive performances came during the Carlton & United Series at Australia in a tri-nation tournament involving Pakistan, Australia and India in 2000. Abdul Razzaq achieved the man of the series award for his best all round performances, especially in a pre-finals match against India, where he scored 70 not out with the bat and took 5 wickets for 48 runs, thus becoming the fifth all-rounder to have scored a half century and take five wickets in an ODI; the other four players being Vivian Richards, Kris Srikkanth, Mark Waugh, and Lance Klusener. Shahid Afridi subsequently achieved the feat thrice for Pakistan.

In the first match of the series against Australia, he took 4 wickets and played an important role for Pakistan helping them to successfully defend a very low target of 184 runs at Brisbane. In the third match of the series, Abdul Razzaq came into prominence after hitting five consecutive boundaries in the fifth over of Australian pacer Glenn McGrath. Eventually Pakistan was defeated in the finals by Australia but Abdul Razzaq was named player of the series for his all-round performance.

==== Prominence ====
In 2000, Abdul Razzaq became the youngest cricketer in the world to take a Test cricket hat-trick in a match against Sri Lanka. He has scored three centuries and twenty two fifties in One Day International matches. His highest score was 112 runs, against South Africa in 2002, where he shared a partnership of 257 runs with Pakistani batsman Saleem Elahi. His second century was scoring 107 runs not out in a match against Zimbabwe in 2004. During this match, he saved Pakistan from a disastrous start and eventually won them the match. His first fifty came in 90 deliveries, before accelerating in the second fifty runs, which was scored in just 21 balls.

On 29 November 2003 at Lahore, Abdul Razzaq sealed a high-scoring chase against New Zealand with a blistering 47 off 22 balls*, taking Pakistan 292/7 past 291/5 with two overs to spare and securing a three-wicket win in the first ODI of the series. During the fifth and last ODI match of the tour, he scored 89 runs from 40 balls, prompting New Zealand captain Stephen Fleming to call him the "best hitter" in the world.

In March 2004, during the 3rd ODI of the Indian tour of Pakistan, Abdul Razzaq hit an unbeaten 53 at a strike-rate of 101 and guided Pakistan past India's 244/9 with 16 balls to spare; in the first innings he had also taken 2 wickets.

In January 2005, he was involved in the ACC Asian XI that took on the ICC World XI in the World Cricket Tsunami Appeal charity match at the Melbourne Cricket Ground in Australia.

As a fast bowler, Abdul Razzaq experienced a steady decline in speed and performance during the 2003 cricket World Cup and 2004. Abdul Razzaq dropped Tendulkar who later on scored a match-winning 98 (75). During this period, he remained as a supporting bowler. However, from 2005 to the end of 2006, he regained his speed and he won many matches for Pakistan with his bowling. His best bowling figures in a One Day International match is 6 wickets for 35 runs. His another notable performance was against Sri Lanka at Sharjah in 1999, where Pakistan was all out for 196 runs and he took 5 wickets for 31 runs to draw the match.

Abdul Razzaq's place in the Pakistan national team has been marred by injuries and absences. In 2005 it was revealed that he was suffering from eating too much spinach, which was causing him to suffer from nausea and sickness while playing. This led to him being known as 'Popeye' by his teammates.

During the 2005–2006 Test match series in India, Abdul Razzaq took 9 wickets and scored 205 runs in two Test matches he played, which resulted in an improvement of his performance. A highlighted performance was during the 1st Test in Mohali, where in tandem with Kamran Akmal, mounted a lower-order rearguard that thwarted India in the opening Test, with Akmal's maiden hundred and Razzaq's adhesive support steering Pakistan away from defeat. Abdul Razzaq had hit 46 runs off 183 deliveries translating to scoring rate of 1.5 runs per over, with 153 dot balls. His batting remained generally consistent from 2000 to 2006, although his place on the Test team was never secure.

During the Indian tour of Pakistan in 2005–06, Abdul Razzaq delivered an all-round performance in the 3rd Test: with the bat he turbo-charged Pakistan's declaration, adding a violent 90 in the morning session (after 45 in the first innings for 135 in the match): he flogged Rudra Pratap Singh and Irfan Pathan for sixes, and even launched Anil Kumble over long-on before finally holing out. With the ball he had already taken three wickets in India's first innings, and in the final session he broke the chase open again, seaming one back to pin Sourav Ganguly, then bouncing out MS Dhoni (driving) and Irfan Pathan (fending to gully). Razzaq completed the job by nicking off Yuvraj Singh, who alone resisted with a high-class century, capping a dominant, match-defining display. He finished the Test series with the most wickets for Pakistan, with 9 of them.

In February 2006, Abdul Razzaq became only the 5th player to achieve the double of 4000 runs and 200 wickets in ODIs.

In 2007, a poor performance in a series with both the bat and ball, in a match against South Africa, accompanied with an injury that forced him out of the 2007 cricket World Cup, had him dropped from the 2007 World Twenty20, a decision that received widespread criticism from cricket individuals.

==== Temporary retirement in 2007 ====
On 20 August 2007, Abdul Razzaq announced his retirement against his omission from the 2007 ICC World Twenty20 squad. However, on 27 October 2007, Abdul Razzaq revoked his decision following discussions with his local cricket club and coach, saying, "Maybe I made that (decision to retire) in the heat of the moment."

"By my making an announcement saying that I've retired, it doesn't mean that it's a permanent thing,".

— Abdul Razzaq on his decision to retire from the Pakistan national team.

He signed up for the Indian Cricket League and played for the Hyderabad Heroes as one of their star players. He eventually severed ties with the league in September 2008 and returned to international cricket in June 2009, helping Pakistan win the 2009 ICC T20 World Cup.

==== Return in team: 2009 World Twenty20 Championship ====
In 2009, he was selected into Pakistan's squad for the 2009 ICC World Twenty20 in England as a replacement for injured fast bowler Yasir Arafat, marking his return to International cricket and becoming the first Indian Cricket League player, whose ban was lifted by the Pakistan Cricket Board. He played an important role in Pakistan's victory in the tournament, taking 5 wickets at an average of 14.80 and an economy rate of 5.92. His figures of 3 wickets for 20 runs, played a significant role in Pakistan's victory against Sri Lanka in the final. As a result, he along with another former Indian Cricket League player Mohammad Yousuf were awarded 'A' category mid-term central contracts by the Pakistan Cricket Board.

In the 2009–2010 season, Abdul Razzaq missed out on the tours of New Zealand and Australia, due to injury. However he was selected in the two match Twenty20 International series against England in February 2010. His innings of 46 runs not out from 18 deliveries in the second match of the series, cemented Pakistan a victory, their first in eleven international outings.

On 30 December when playing in a game for the Melbourne Renegades, former Australian cricketer Mark Waugh described Abdul Razzaq as a "cardboard cut out" based on his appeared disinterest when playing.

==== ODI return: against New Zealand ====
Upon his ODI return, he played a fine little cameo for Pakistan with the bat scoring 23 runs of 20 deliveries and pushed the score to 287. New Zealand needed 288 to win and Abdul Razzaq took the key wickets of Scott Styris and Jacob Oram to ensure that Pakistan thrash New Zealand by 141 runs. His final figures of 3.3-1-17-2 were the second best after the prime bowler Umar Gul and ahead of the other strike bowler, Sohail Tanvir. In the second ODI, he took the wickets of Martin Guptill (62) and Daniel Vettori on (30). Despite this, New Zealand ended the innings at 303/8. Pakistan collapsed to 239 all out, with Abdul Razzaq scoring 35 runs. With the series levelled 1–1 Pakistan went into the third ODI and bowled New Zealand out for 211. Despite this Pakistan suffered a top order collapse at 79/7 with Younis Khan, Salman Butt, Khalid Latif, Shoaib Malik, Kamran Akmal, Umar Akmal and Shahid Afridi falling cheaply. Then Abdul Razzaq came in and registered a duck as he was run out by Vettori. Gul fell cheaply as well but Pakistan still got agonizingly close to victory, when Mohammad Amir and Saeed Ajmal were engaged in a 103 run partnership before Ajmal top edged a pull on the first ball of the last over as Pakistan were seven runs short of victory.

==== Hand injury: No participation against Australia ====
Abdul Razzaq picked up a hand injury just before the first ODI against Australia and missed the whole five match series and the only Twenty20 match. He was hit on the hand while batting during the practice sessions The series turned out to be a forgettable one of Pakistan as Mohammad Yousuf and Younis Khan received life bans (overturned 2 months later) for inflicting fighting in the team. Also Rana Naved-ul-Hasan was given a one-year ban along with Shoaib Malik being banned for a year all were overturned on appeal. Amid the fighting Pakistan lost the five match series 5–0 and the only Twenty20 match as well.

==== Top all-round form (2010) ====
With players like Younis Khan, Mohammad Yousuf and Shoaib Malik suffering from selection issues, it was Abdul Razzaq who took up the role of a senior player in the Pakistan cricket team. He was selected in the squad for the 2010 ICC World Twenty20 and performed admirably with the bat scoring five sixes during the tournament. Pakistan crashed out of the tournament after losing to Australia in the semi-final. Abdul Razzaq then took part in the 2010 Asia Cup.

In July 2010, Abdul Razzaq played in the two T20Is against Australia as Pakistan won both matches comfortably. He wasn't selected for the Test series against Australia and England and next played in the September 2010 Twenty20 and ODI series against England. The Pakistan team had been surrounded by Spot-fixing allegations as the team lost both Twenty20 matches due to low morale. Abdul Razzaq missed the first two ODI's against England because of a back-strain as Pakistan lost both matches. He returned to the third ODI and scored 31 runs in a fruitful partnership with Shahid Afridi before Afridi was run out and Abdul Razzaq was subsequently caught in the deep square leg as Pakistan were bowled out for 241. England opened the innings strongly before Umar Gul removed six batsmen and Abdul Razzaq took two wickets to seal a 23-run victory for Pakistan.

Abdul Razzaq's lower order destruction also became helpful for his domestic team the Lahore Lions as he scored 138 runs from his four innings including a superb 73* in the final to help guide his team to victory in the 2010–11 Faysal Bank Twenty-20 Cup.

On 31 October 2010, in the second One Day International against South Africa, Abdul Razzaq played a match-winning innings of 109* off 72 balls at a strike rate of 151.38, his third One Day International century. The innings which contained seven fours and ten sixes saw Pakistan to a one-wicket win with one ball remaining and level the 5-match series 1–1.

==== Series against New Zealand, World Cup preparation (2011) ====
Abdul Razzaq struggled with the bat in the first two Twenty20's against New Zealand but he did perform admirably with the ball taking out Jesse Ryder for a golden duck in the second Twenty20. During the third match Abdul Razzaq blasted 34 off just 11 balls in an innings that included 3 fours and 3 sixes. This innings helped Pakistan push their total onto 184. Abdul Razzaq then did the damage with the ball taking the leading run scorer of the series Martin Guptill out for a duck and then took two more top order wickets of Ross Taylor (leg-before) and clean bowled James Franklin. For this superb all round perform coupled with a 103 run victory for Pakistan, Abdul Razzaq won the award for the player of the match. However two early losses in the series meant New Zealand won the series 2–1.

==== 2011 Cricket World Cup ====
Abdul Razzaq was included in Pakistan's 15-man squad for the 2011 World Cup hosted by Bangladesh, India, and Sri Lanka between February and April. His role was to open the bowling and bat down the order. In his first two matches, he had faced just 10 balls, however he scored 20 not out from 24 balls against Australia to guide Pakistan to victory, ending Australia's string of 34 matches in World Cups without defeat.

=== Domestic career ===
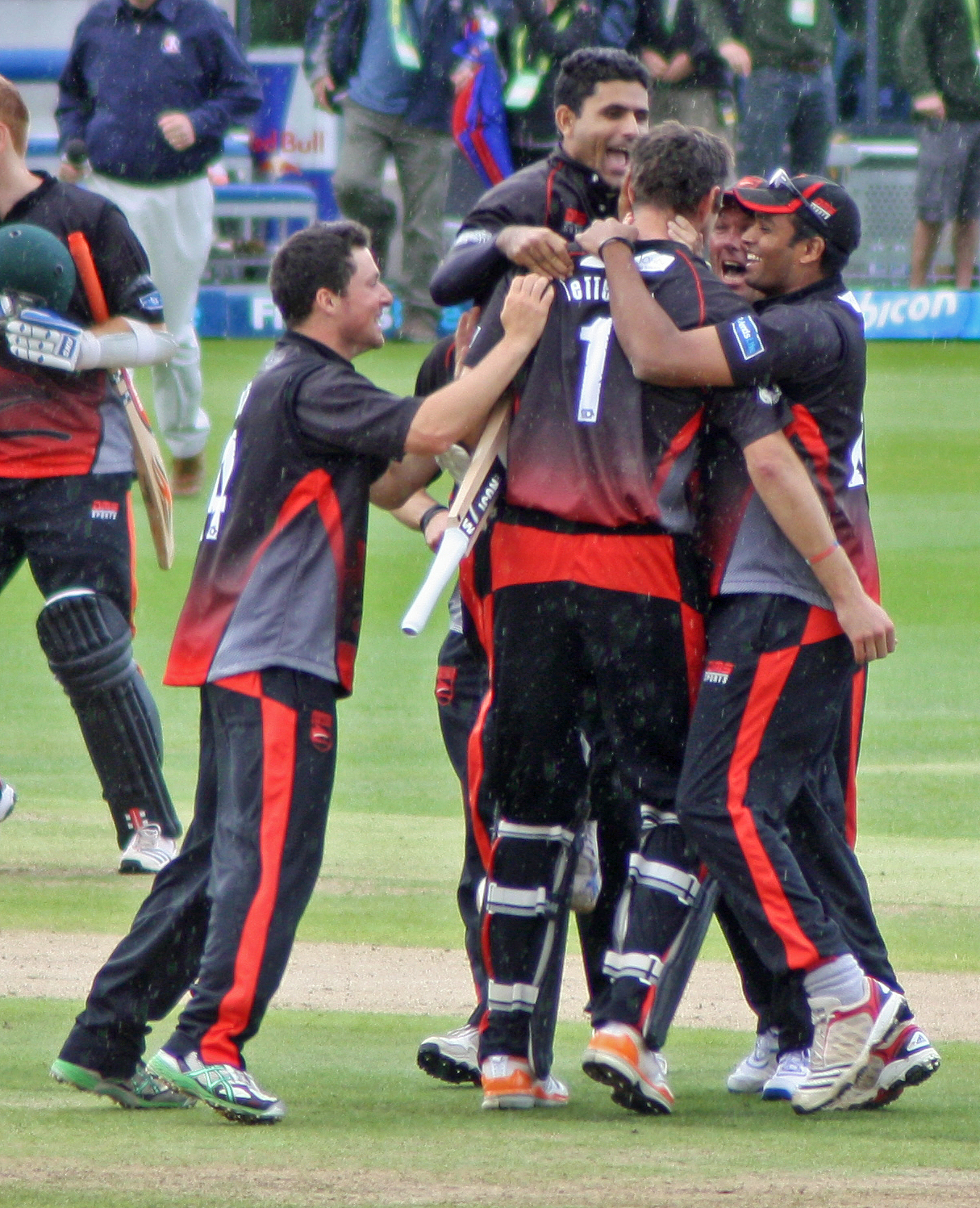
Abdul Razzaq celebrating Leicestershire winning the semi-final of the 2011 Friends Life t20. The team went on to win the competition.

==== Indian Cricket League ====
In 2007–2008, he played in the Indian Cricket League, playing for Hyderabad Heroes. His excellent performance in the last over during the Indian Cricket League final, allowed his team to take a 1–0 lead in the best of three finals. The finals were eventually won by Hyderabad Heroes, 2–0. During this time, his international career remained in doubt, as the Pakistan Cricket Board had banned players who participated in the unofficial league.

After playing for two seasons, he departed from the Indian Cricket League to be selected and play for the Pakistan national team, saying that he hoped the Pakistan Cricket Board's ban on Indian Cricket League players would soon be revoked and that he has a desire to play for Pakistan national team once again, affirming that his retirement was not necessarily a permanent decision.

==== English county cricket ====
He has also played at the English county level for Middlesex, Worcestershire and Surrey. He joined Surrey in June 2008 on a short-term contract to play in the Twenty20 Cup. He helped Surrey win against Sussex by scoring 39 runs from 19 balls. Despite his short period at The Oval, Abdul Razzaq became a favourite player amongst Surrey supporters.

In March 2010 Abdul Razzaq signed for Hampshire County Cricket Club as one of their four overseas players for the English domestic Twenty20 competition. He played a starring role in their victory against Somerset on finals day at Hampshire's home ground, the Rose Bowl.

Abdul Razzaq signed for Leicestershire County Cricket Club as their second overseas players for the English domestic Friends Life t20. At the 2011 Friends Life t20 he again played for the winning team, this time as a Leicestershire player, against Somerset on the finals day. He also played in both Leicestershire's games in the Champions League T20s, but was unable to help Leicestershire through the qualification stage. He has signed for Staffordshire club Hem Heath for the 2014 Season.

== Playing style ==
=== Batting ===
As a batter, Abdul Razzaq was cast primarily as a middle-order player but proved adaptable higher up, supplying clean, straight hitting and the temperament to close innings. Early assessments noted that he could be promoted to accelerate or stabilize, with a method built on a compact base rather than slogging; his ability to "bat well higher up for Pakistan" made him a flexible option in one-day sides and a useful counterpuncher in Tests.

In 2005, The Wisden Cricketer magazine polled 20 leading international bowlers, including Brett Lee and Muttiah Muralitharan, to name the most feared batsmen in ODIs. Adam Gilchrist was voted first, while Abdul Razzaq ranked 9th, notably ahead of Ricky Ponting (10th), underscoring his standing as a destructive lower-order hitter.

Beyond his big hitting, Abdul Razzaq could grind in Tests: he batted seven hours for 87 against Walsh and Ambrose in Guyana, six hours for 72 in the next Test, and scored a Test hundred from No. 3 against England, notwithstanding the notorious 76-ball 4 at the MCG against Australia. His most celebrated rearguard came versus India at Mohali (2005): coming in late on day four with Pakistan effectively 39 for 6, Razzaq paired with Kamran Akmal for 56.1 overs, adding 184 to save the match; Akmal made a counterattacking maiden century while Razzaq held the line for nearly six hours.

Abdul Razzaq is the only ODI batsman to have occupied all batting positions, from opener (No. 2) to No. 11.

=== Bowling ===
Razzaq's stronger suit was seam bowling: a line-and-length operator who could move the ball both ways, with a disguised leg-cutter as his stock delivery. He was praised for extreme accuracy and for throttling scoring rates, "not allowing [batsmen] to score freely", whether with the new ball or the older ball. A self-confessed disciple of Wasim Akram, he modeled his craft on controlled swing rather than raw pace, developing into a new-ball option who could also bowl holding patterns through the middle overs.

For some phase in the early 2000s, his in-ducker, an inswinging delivery that moves into the batsman very late, to get the wicket of Sachin Tendulkar became a talking point, while at his peak he could maintain speeds around the ~140 km/h (high-80s mph) mark and was noted as "a mean reverser of the ball." His fastest recorded delivery was measured at 147.2 km/h (≈ 91.5 mph), against England in 2001.

== Post-retirement ==
=== Coaching career ===
In a 2014 interview, Abdul Razzaq said he wanted to move into coaching with a focus on power-hitting, outlining simple hitting principles (stable base, clean swing, timing).

At domestic level, Abdul Razzaq was appointed head coach to Khyber Pakhtunkhwa, and under him the team won the Quaid-e-Azam Trophy, National T20 Cup and Pakistan Cup in the 2020–21 season, later he became the head coach of Central Punjab for the 2021-22 domestic season.

Abdul Razzaq was appointed as the interim head coach of the Pakistan national team alongside Saqlain Mushtaq on 6 September 2021 by PCB for New Zealand tour of Pakistan 2021, after Misbah-ul-Haq and Waqar Younis stepped down as coaches, but the series later got called off.

In September 2022, he was appointed head coach to the Hyderabad Hunters squad for the inaugural season of the Pakistan Junior League.

In April 2024, Abdul Razzaq was appointed assistant coach for Pakistan national cricket team's upcoming 5-match T20 series against New Zealand national cricket team. Following Pakistan's poor showing at the 2024 ICC Men's T20 World Cup, the PCB dismissed Wahab Riaz and Abdul Razzaq from the national selection committee on 9 July 2024.

== International records ==
=== Test cricket ===
- Test debut vs Australia in Brisbane in 1999–2000.
- Best Test batting score of 134 runs was made against Bangladesh in Dhaka in 2001–2002.
- Best Test bowling figures of 5 wickets for 35 runs came against Sri Lanka in Karachi in 2004–2005.
- He took his first Test Hat-trick vs Sri Lanka in Galle International Stadium in 2000.

=== One Day International ===
- One Day International debut vs Zimbabwe in Lahore in 1996–1997.
- Best One Day International batting score of 112 runs was made against South Africa in Port Elizabeth in 2002–2003.
- Best One Day International bowling figures of 6 wickets for 35 runs came against Bangladesh in Dhaka in 2001–2002.
- Best 7th wicket score (109 from 72 balls) against South Africa in Abu-Dhabi in October 2010

=== Achievements ===
- He is one of 53 players, including 8 who have represented Pakistan, who have achieved the double of 1,000 Test runs and 100 Test wickets.
- He is the youngest bowler to take a hat-trick, against Sri Lanka in 2000, at the age of 20.
- He has batted at every position from an opener to No.11
- In 2009 he along with Nasir Jamshed set the highest 3rd wicket partnership ever in any forms of T20s (162)
