= Mohammad Khalil (cricketer) =

Pakistani cricketer (born 1982)

Personal information
- Born: 11 November 1982 (age 44); Lahore, Punjab, Pakistan
- Batting: Left-handed
- Bowling: Left-arm medium

International information
- National side: Pakistan (2004–2005)
- Test debut (cap 183): 16 December 2004 v Australia
- Last Test: 16 March 2005 v India
- ODI debut (cap 153): 30 January 2005 v Australia
- Last ODI: 4 February 2005 v Australia

Career statistics
Competition	Test	ODIs
Matches	2	3
Runs scored	9	–
Batting average	3.00	–
100s/50s	0/0	–
Top score	5	–
Balls bowled	290	144
Wickets	0	5
Bowling average	–	28.80
5 wickets in innings	–	0
10 wickets in match	–	0
Best bowling	–	2/55
Catches/stumpings	0/–	2/–
- Source: ESPNCricinfo, 4 February 2006

Mohammad Khalil (Punjabi, Urdu: محمد خلیل; born 11 November 1982) is a Pakistani former cricketer who played for the Pakistan national cricket team in 2004 and 2005. He was a left-handed batsman and a left-arm medium-pace bowler.

After only playing six first-class games, he was picked in the Test squad of Pakistani cricket team to play against Bangladesh in 2003/04. However, he could not get a chance to play in the series, later in the next season he finally made his Test debut during the first Test against Australia at the WACA Ground in December 2004, but was dropped after failing to claim a wicket. He was picked in the Pakistan ODI squad for the 2004–05 VB Series, and made his ODI debut in the 8th match of the series against Australia.
