= Naved-ul-Hasan =

Pakistani cricketer

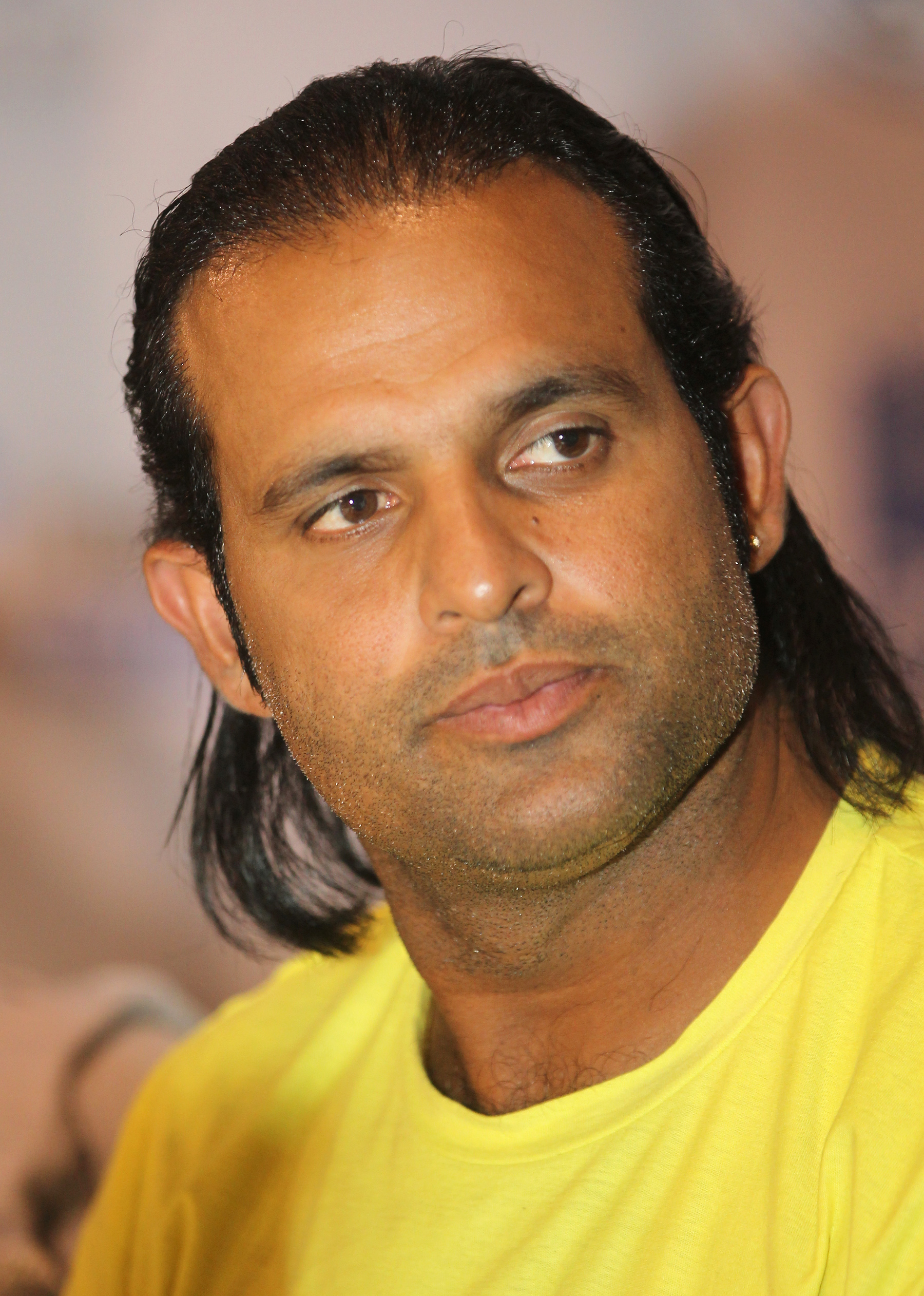

Personal information
- Full name: Rana Naved-ul-Hasan
- Born: 28 February 1978 (age 48); Sheikhupura, Punjab, Pakistan
- Height: 6 ft 1 in (185 cm)
- Batting: Right-handed
- Bowling: Right-arm fast-medium
- Role: Bowling all-rounder

International information
- National side: Pakistan (2004–2010)
- Test debut (cap 181): 28 October 2004 v Sri Lanka
- Last Test: 11 January 2007 v South Africa
- ODI debut (cap 146): 4 April 2003 v Sri Lanka
- Last ODI: 31 January 2010 v Australia
- ODI shirt no.: 24
- T20I debut (cap 7): 28 August 2006 v England
- Last T20I: 7 September 2010 v England

Domestic team information
- Years: Team
- 1999–2000: Lahore Division
- 2000–2001: Sheikhupura
- 2001: Pakistan Customs
- 2001: Allied Bank Limited
- 2001–2015: Water and Power Development Authority
- 2004–2005: Sialkot
- 2005–2011: Sussex
- 2005–2014: Sialkot Stallions
- 2008–2009: Yorkshire
- 2009–2011: Tasmania
- 2011–2012: Hobart Hurricanes
- 2012: Dhaka Gladiators
- 2012: Derbyshire
- 2012: Uthura Rudras

Career statistics
Competition	Test	ODI	T20I	FC
Matches	9	74	4	156
Runs scored	239	524	18	4,431
Batting average	19.91	15.87	18.00	21.93
100s/50s	0/0	0/0	0/0	5/12
Top score	42*	33	18	139
Balls bowled	1565	3,466	85	28,391
Wickets	18	110	5	655
Bowling average	58.00	29.28	20.20	24.24
5 wickets in innings	0	1	0	34
10 wickets in match	0	0	0	7
Best bowling	3/30	6/27	3/19	7/49
Catches/stumpings	3/–	16/–	2/–	73/–
- Source: ESPNcricinfo, 9 January 2019

Rana Naved-ul-Hasan (Punjabi, Urdu: رانا نوِیدُالحسَن; born 28 February 1978) is a Pakistani cricket coach and former cricketer who played all formats of the game.

A right-arm fast-medium bowler capable of generating good pace with the late swing, he was a genuine strike bowler. Prone to leaking runs earlier in his career, he later used his vast county experience to be economical in death overs. He often bowled the reverse-swinging yorker in one day and T20 cricket and had good control over change of pace, though he sometimes could be expensive. Naved-ul-Hasan was also a useful attacking lower-order batsman with 5 first-class centuries and many fifties, including a score of 95 in 57 balls in a T20 game which lifted his team Sialkot Stallions to the tournament final. He discontinued playing cricket for personal reasons between 1995 and 1999.

Naved-ul-Hasan also boasted an exceptional pedigree in domestic Twenty20 cricket played all around the world, having amassed 75 appearances with Sialkot Stallions, Sussex Sharks, Yorkshire Carnegie, Tasmania Tigers and Hobart Hurricanes.

County Championship winner with Sussex in 2006 and 2007, Naved is no stranger to the county game, having also represented Yorkshire in 2008 and 2009. Naved has been in KFC Twenty20 Big Bash action in Australia for Hobart Hurricanes, recently topping the tournament wicket-takers list with 15 dismissals in eight matches and gaining cult status with the nickname "The People's Mullet".

== Early career ==
Rana Naved-ul-Hasan says he came to cricket by chance: originally a hockey Right Out who represented Pakistan U-16, a serious knee injury ended his hockey. On his father’s advice, who was a sports teacher in Sheikhupura, he switched from tape-ball to hard-ball cricket, played for Government College Sheikhupura and MCB’s juniors, then toured New Zealand with Pakistan’s youth side in 1994. Coach Billy Ibadulla urged the board to persevere with him; Naved captained Pakistan U-19 against West Indies and won Man of the Series.

== International career ==
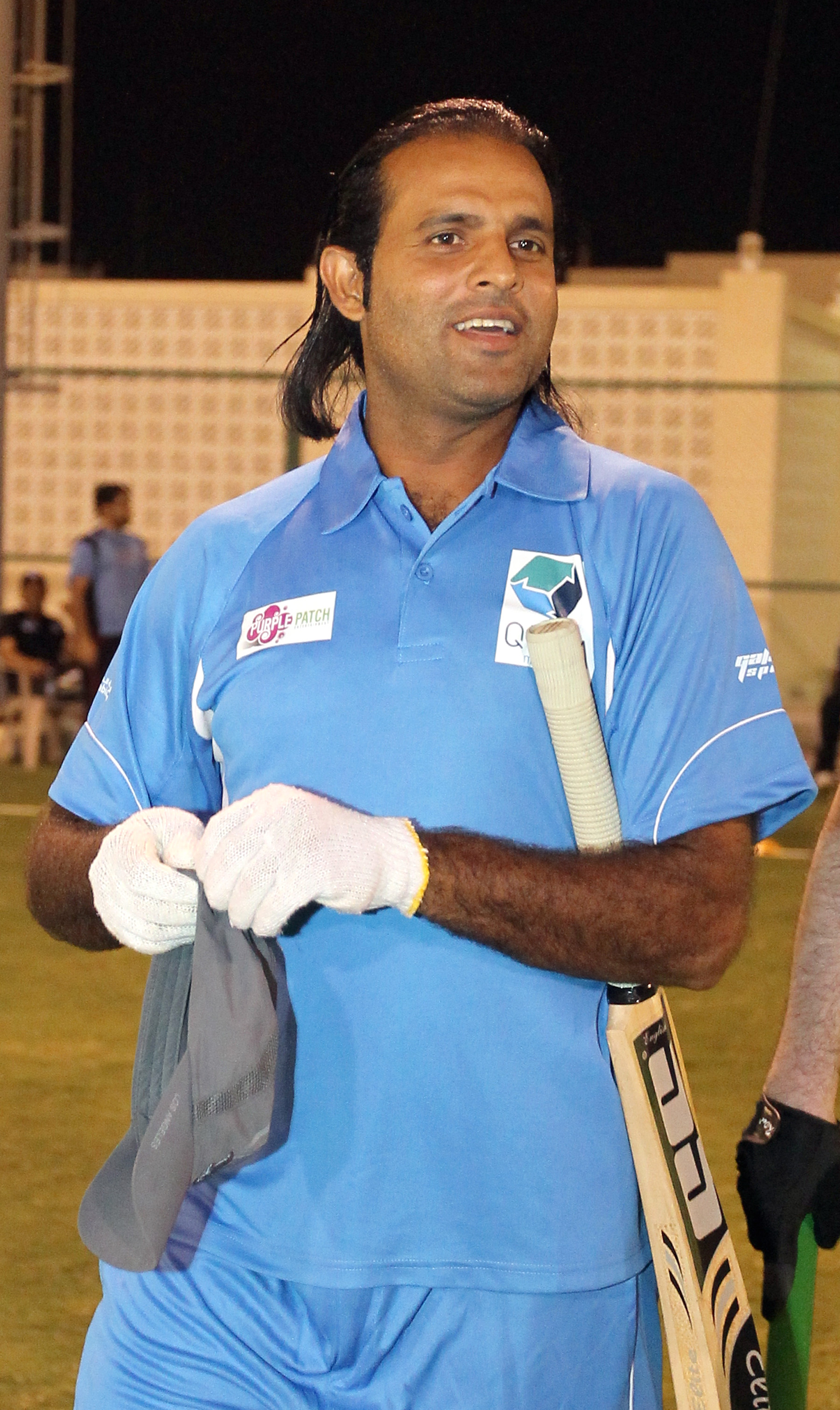
Naved-Ul-Hasan c. 2012

Naved-ul-Hasan only made the occasional Test appearance for Pakistan with little success, having to compete with Shoaib Akhtar, Mohammad Asif, Umar Gul and Mohammad Sami for a place in the side. As a result, he became regular in ODI. Naved's career with Pakistan saw him take 110 wickets in 74 one-day internationals between 2003 and 2010 and a career best of 6–27 versus India in 2005. The 33-year-old Pakistani bowler has good of international experience, having represented his country on 87 occasions.

Naved-ul-Hasan made his international debut at the Cherry Blossom Sharjah Cup on 4 April immediately after the poor 2003 Cricket World Cup campaign in which Pakistan were eliminated in the first round and a number of players were dropped. Playing against Sri Lanka, Rana took the wickets of Hashan Tillakaratne and Prasanna Jayawardene in consecutive balls but failed to take a hat-trick. Despite several good performances he was soon dropped from the side for alleged disciplinary problems.

With injuries to key members of the Pakistani pace attack he worked his way back into the side before once again falling out of favour with the national selectors and unable to stake a claim ahead of emerging young fast bowlers such as Umar Gul and Iftikhar Anjum.

In April 2005, in the 3rd ODI of the Pakistan tour of India, he earned his career best figures, 6 for 27, made in a victory over India in Jamshedpur. His bowling stood out for its pace and bounce despite the pitch being noted as batting friendly, with most of his wickets having been in-form top and middle order batsmen. He was made Player of the Match. He was later named Man of the Series for his 15 ODI wickets.

For his performances in 2005, he was named in the World ODI XI by the ICC.

On 22 July 2009, Naved-ul-Hasan was recalled in Pakistan's ODI squad for Sri Lanka as well as for the provisional 30-man squad for ICC Champions Trophy 2009 and a day later Pakistan Cricket Board awarded him a 'C' category contact.

His finest performances for Pakistan have come in ODIs against India and West Indies – 56 of his 95 wickets have come against them, but he has struggled for consistency.

== Franchise career ==
=== Bangladesh Premier League ===
Rana Naved-ul-Hasan was selected in the Dhaka Gladiators team in the inaugural BPL tournament, where Pakistani stars were the biggest winners, sold for a massive $100,000, $50,000 above his base price, after performing very well in the Big Bash tournament with the ball.

=== Big Bash League ===
He played T20 Cricket for the Australian domestic Big Bash League teams the Tasmanian Tigers and the Hobart Hurricanes in the 2009–10 season. He has become a cult hero in the state and is known as "The People's Mullet" amongst the masses. He produced a match-winning all-round display for Tasmania against Western Australia in the 2009–10 Big Bash, smashing 47 off 27 balls and then taking 3 for 29. His efforts secured a 17-run win at Bellerive Oval and earned him Player of the Match.

He was the leading wicket taker in Australia's Big Bash League in the 2011–12 edition, where he claimed 15 scalps for Hobart.

=== English county cricket ===
In June 2005, Naved played English county cricket, joining Sussex. He formed an effective partnership with fellow Pakistani bowler Mushtaq Ahmed. He has also had success with the bat, scoring a career best 139 against Middlesex.

On 12 September 2007 Naved dislocated his shoulder in a match against Durham and had to be carried off the field. This was thought to have been his last game for Sussex as the ECB brought in a rule which restricts each county to one overseas player and Sussex opted for Mushtaq Ahmed.

Naved received offers from Leicestershire and Yorkshire to remain in English County Cricket, and on 26 September 2007 signed a two-year deal with Yorkshire.

=== Indian Cricket League (2007-09) ===
He joined the Indian Cricket League (ICL) for the 2008 season, where he made a huge impact as batsman and bowler.

Ul-Hasan played in Indian Cricket League for Lahore Badshahs between 2007 and 2009. He played an important role in team's success. He was the Player of the Series in the 2008-09 edition, taking 22 wickets at an average of 12.77, and an economy of 6.66, and scoring 189 runs at an average of 27, and a strike rate of 144.27.

He played a total of 26 matches for Lahore Badshahs in which he scored 367 runs at an average of 33.36, and a strike rate of 146.8, and took 40 wickets at an average of 17.68, and an economy of 7.12. Voted the '2008 Man of the Tournament' for the guiding the Lahore Badshah's to the ICL Championship, Rana Naved was arguably in a great form.

== Playing style ==
Rana Naved-ul-Hasan was a bowling all-rounder, his primary fonction being a seam bowler who could hit big down the order. Peter Moores, his coach at Sussex, explained Naved-ul-Hasan’s appeal as a late signing: after four seasons in the Bradford League and strong reports about a competitive quick with outswing, a sharp bouncer, and a deceptive slower ball, the clincher was his first-class numbers, taking wickets at ~23 and averaging roughly the same with the bat, concluding by saying "to find a player like that is unusual."

=== Bowling ===
Rana Naved-ul-Hasan, renowned as a specialist "death" bowler, has a century of ODI dismissals to his name at an average of 29.28.

In 2005, during the Pakistan tour of India, it was argued that Naved-ul-Hasan wasn’t just a swing bowler and could maintain genuine pace, as at times he cranked it up to around 90 mph (roughly 145 kph), hurrying top batters and even undoing Sachin Tendulkar with a pull shot.

Regarded as one of the best "death" bowlers in the game late in his career, Naved had the ability to vary his pace without a discernible change in action, and without losing control. In favourable conditions, he could also bowl orthodox and reverse swing. In a 2007 profile he was called "the best ODI bowler at the death", after he had lost form with the new ball: with the old ball in slog overs his average and strike rate were both under 10, making him a specialist finisher; in contrast, during the first 40 overs he averaged 58.69, conceded 5.36 rpo, and took a wicket every 66 balls.

In an interview, he took pride in having dismissed Virender Sehwag six times in a year, most often using a well disguised slower ball.

=== Batting ===
While better known for his big hitting down the order, Naved could also play a more compact game, like during a Test against South Africa, where he showcased "proper biffing" with the tail, an analyst noting how Pakistan’s lower order, especially Naved-ul-Hasan, entertained with horizontal-bat swipes, crunching pulls interspersed with the odd cut or drive, more heaves than classical strokes.

An example of his power hitting includes the ICL World Series 2008–09, when ICL Pakistan XI beat the ICL World XI by six wickets in a T20, as he hit 74 off 38 deliveries against a bowling line-up that included former international cricketers such as Jason Gillespie, Lance Klusener and Nantie Hayward. He came to bat at No. 4 and hit Hayward for three fours in a row.

=== Fielding ===
Rana Naved-ul-Hasan’s fielding could be match-turning. Sri Lanka coach Trevor Bayliss said the decisive moment in their defeat during the 4th ODI of the Pakistan tour of Sri Lanka in 2009 came when Naved produced a diving, one-handed catch to dismiss Chamara Kapugedera, a piece of athleticism that swung the game Pakistan’s way.

== Post-retirement ==
=== Cricket academy ===
Naved-ul-Hasan has also started a cricket academy few years back after his retirement with the help some of his friend Naveed Khan and Nauman Bhatti. In one of the interview on a local TV channel Naveed said that his mission is to train the new generation and to produce better players.

=== Coaching career ===
In February 2023, he was appointed bowling coach to the Afghanistan team.

== Controversies ==
=== One-year PCB ban (2010) ===
After a disastrous tour of Australia in January, Naved-ul-Hasan was banned for 1-year along with several other players receiving different types of consequences. However the PCB lifted his ban but he had already served six-months of his sentence. Other players implicated included Mohammad Yousuf, Younis Khan both were banned for life but had their bans lifted after two months. And Shoaib Malik was banned for one-year and had his ban lifted after serving three-months of it. And with that ban they were also fined.
