= New Zealand cricket team against Pakistan in the UAE in 2018–19 =

International cricket tour

New Zealand cricket team against Pakistan in UAE 2018–19
	Pakistan	New Zealand
- Dates: 31 October – 7 December 2018
Captains	Sarfaraz Ahmed	Kane Williamson (Note: Tom Latham captained New Zealand in the third ODI.)

Test series
- Result: New Zealand won the 3-match series 2–1
Most runs	Azhar Ali (307)	Kane Williamson (386)
Most wickets	Yasir Shah (29)	Ajaz Patel (13)
- Player of the series: Yasir Shah (Pak)

One Day International series
- Results: 3-match series drawn 1–1
Most runs	Fakhar Zaman (154)	Ross Taylor (166)
Most wickets	Shaheen Afridi (9)	Lockie Ferguson (11)
- Player of the series: Shaheen Afridi (Pak)

Twenty20 International series
- Results: Pakistan won the 3-match series 3–0
Most runs	Mohammad Hafeez (132)	Kane Williamson (108)
Most wickets	Imad Wasim (4); Shadab Khan (4)	Adam Milne (4)
- Player of the series: Mohammad Hafeez (Pak)

The New Zealand cricket team toured the United Arab Emirates between October and December 2018 to play three Tests, three One Day Internationals (ODIs) and three Twenty20 International (T20Is) matches against Pakistan. Originally, the tour was scheduled to have three Tests, five ODIs and one T20I match.

In February 2018, the Pakistan Cricket Board (PCB) looked at the possibility of hosting this series and Australia's tour to the UAE in Malaysia instead of the UAE, due to domestic Twenty20 fixture congestion in Sharjah. In May 2018, the PCB invited New Zealand to play the fixtures in Pakistan. In June 2018, the PCB and the Emirates Cricket Board (ECB) agreed to play Pakistan's future matches in the UAE. In July 2018, New Zealand Cricket (NZC) confirmed that they had declined the PCB's offer to play the T20I fixtures in Pakistan because of security concerns. Therefore, all the matches on the tour took place in the UAE as scheduled.

Pakistan won the T20I series 3–0, setting a new record for the most consecutive series wins in T20Is, with eleven. The ODI series was drawn 1–1, after the third match finished as a no result due to rain.

During the third Test, Pakistan's Mohammad Hafeez announced that he would retire from Test cricket following the conclusion of the match, to focus on limited-overs cricket. Hafeez said that the time was right to retire from Test cricket and that he was honoured to represent Pakistan in 55 Test matches, including captaining the side. In the same match, Pakistan's Yasir Shah set a new record for the fastest bowler to take 200 wickets in Tests. He achieved it in his 33rd Test, breaking an 82-year old record that was set by Clarrie Grimmett of Australia, who took his 200th wicket in his 36th match. New Zealand went on to win the Test series 2–1. It was New Zealand's first away Test series win against Pakistan since 1969.

== Squads ==
Tests		ODIs		T20Is	
Pakistan	New Zealand	Pakistan	New Zealand	Pakistan	New Zealand
Sarfaraz Ahmed (c, wk); Mohommad Abbas; Shaheen Afridi; Azhar Ali; Hasan Ali; Saad Ali; Faheem Ashraf; Bilal Asif; Babar Azam; Mohammad Hafeez; Imam-ul-Haq; Mir Hamza; Asad Shafiq; Yasir Shah; Haris Sohail	Kane Williamson (c); ~~Todd Astle~~; Tom Blundell; Trent Boult; Colin de Grandhomme; Matt Henry; Tom Latham; Henry Nicholls; Ajaz Patel; Jeet Raval; Ish Sodhi; William Somerville; Tim Southee; Ross Taylor; Neil Wagner; BJ Watling	Sarfaraz Ahmed (c, wk); Shaheen Afridi; Asif Ali; Hasan Ali; Faheem Ashraf; Babar Azam; Imam-ul-Haq; Mohammad Hafeez; Junaid Khan; Shadab Khan; Usman Khan; Shoaib Malik; Haris Sohail; Imad Wasim; Fakhar Zaman	Kane Williamson (c); ~~Todd Astle~~; Trent Boult; Colin de Grandhomme; Lockie Ferguson; ~~Martin Guptill~~; Matt Henry; Tom Latham; Colin Munro; Henry Nicholls; Ajaz Patel; Ish Sodhi; Tim Southee; Ross Taylor; BJ Watling; George Worker	Sarfaraz Ahmed (c, wk); Shaheen Afridi; Asif Ali; Hasan Ali; Faheem Ashraf; Babar Azam; Sahibzada Farhan; Mohammad Hafeez; Shadab Khan; Usman Khan; Shoaib Malik; Waqas Maqsood; Hussain Talat; Imad Wasim; Fakhar Zaman	Kane Williamson (c); Corey Anderson; Mark Chapman; Colin de Grandhomme; Lockie Ferguson; ~~Martin Guptill~~; Adam Milne; Colin Munro; Ajaz Patel; Glenn Phillips; Seth Rance; Tim Seifert; Ish Sodhi; Tim Southee; Ross Taylor

Ahead of the tour, Martin Guptill was ruled out of New Zealand's ODI and T20I squads with a calf injury. Corey Anderson, Glenn Phillips and Ajaz Patel were added to New Zealand's T20I squad before the start of the tour. Ahead of the ODI series, Lockie Ferguson, Ajaz Patel and George Worker were added to New Zealand's ODI squad. Todd Astle was ruled out of both the ODI and Test series with a knee injury with William Somerville replacing him in New Zealand's Test squad.

== T20I series ==
=== 1st T20I ===
31 October 2018
20:00 (N)
Scorecard

Pakistan; 148/6 (20 overs)	v	New Zealand; 146/6 (20 overs)
Mohammad Hafeez 45 (36); Adam Milne 2/28 (4 overs)		Colin Munro 58 (42); Hasan Ali 3/35 (4 overs)

Pakistan won by 2 runs
Sheikh Zayed Cricket Stadium, Abu Dhabi
Umpires: Shozab Raza (Pak) and Asif Yaqoob (Pak)
Player of the match: Mohammad Hafeez (Pak)

- Pakistan won the toss and elected to bat.
- Ajaz Patel (NZ) made his T20I debut.

=== 2nd T20I ===
2 November 2018
20:00 (N)
Scorecard

New Zealand; 153/7 (20 overs)	v	Pakistan; 154/4 (19.4 overs)
Corey Anderson 44* (25); Shaheen Afridi 3/20 (4 overs)		Babar Azam 40 (41); Adam Milne 2/25 (2.4 overs)

Pakistan won by 6 wickets
Dubai International Cricket Stadium, Dubai
Umpires: Shozab Raza (Pak) and Rashid Riaz (Pak)
Player of the match: Shaheen Afridi (Pak)

- New Zealand won the toss and elected to bat.
- With this victory, Pakistan set a new record for the most consecutive series wins in T20Is (11).

=== 3rd T20I ===
4 November 2018
20:00 (N)
Scorecard

Pakistan; 166/3 (20 overs)	v	New Zealand; 119 (16.5 overs)
Babar Azam 79 (58); Colin de Grandhomme 2/41 (4 overs)		Kane Williamson 60 (38); Shadab Khan 3/30 (4 overs)

Pakistan won by 47 runs
Dubai International Cricket Stadium, Dubai
Umpires: Rashid Riaz (Pak) and Asif Yaqoob (Pak)
Player of the match: Babar Azam (Pak)

- Pakistan won the toss and elected to bat.
- Waqas Maqsood (Pak) made his T20I debut.
- Babar Azam (Pak) became the fastest batsman, in terms of innings, to score 1,000 runs in T20Is (26).

== ODI series ==
=== 1st ODI ===
7 November 2018
15:00 (D/N)
Scorecard

New Zealand; 266/9 (50 overs)	v	Pakistan; 219 (47.2 overs)
Ross Taylor 80 (112); Shadab Khan 4/38 (10 overs)		Sarfaraz Ahmed 64 (69); Lockie Ferguson 3/36 (9.2 overs)

New Zealand won by 47 runs
Sheikh Zayed Cricket Stadium, Abu Dhabi
Umpires: Shozab Raza (Pak) and Joel Wilson (WI)
Player of the match: Trent Boult (NZ)

- New Zealand won the toss and elected to bat.
- Trent Boult became the third bowler for New Zealand to take a hat-trick in ODIs.

=== 2nd ODI ===
9 November 2018
15:00 (D/N)
Scorecard

New Zealand; 209/9 (50 overs)	v	Pakistan; 212/4 (40.3 overs)
Ross Taylor 86* (120); Shaheen Afridi 4/38 (9 overs)		Fakhar Zaman 88 (88); Lockie Ferguson 3/60 (10 overs)

Pakistan won by 6 wickets
Sheikh Zayed Cricket Stadium, Abu Dhabi
Umpires: Nigel Llong (Eng) and Shozab Raza (Pak)
Player of the match: Shaheen Afridi (Pak)

- New Zealand won the toss and elected to bat.

=== 3rd ODI ===
11 November 2018
15:00 (D/N)
Scorecard

Pakistan; 279/8 (50 overs)	v	New Zealand; 35/1 (6.5 overs)
Babar Azam 92 (100); Lockie Ferguson 5/45 (10 overs)		George Worker 18* (19); Shaheen Afridi 1/18 (3.5 overs)

No result
Dubai International Cricket Stadium, Dubai
Umpires: Shozab Raza (Pak) and Joel Wilson (WI)
Player of the match: Lockie Ferguson (NZ)

- Pakistan won the toss and elected to bat.
- Rain during New Zealand's innings prevented any further play.
- Lockie Ferguson (NZ) took his first five-wicket haul in ODIs.

== Test series ==
=== 1st Test ===
16–20 November 2018 (Note: While five days of play were scheduled for each Test, the first and second Tests reached a result in four days.)
Scorecard

New Zealand	v	Pakistan
153 (66.3 overs); Kane Williamson 63 (112); Yasir Shah 3/54 (16.3 overs)		227 (83.2 overs); Babar Azam 62 (109); Trent Boult 4/54 (18.2 overs)
249 (100.4 overs); BJ Watling 59 (145); Hasan Ali 5/45 (17.4 overs)		171 (58.4 overs); Azhar Ali 65 (136); Ajaz Patel 5/59 (23.4 overs)

New Zealand won by 4 runs
Sheikh Zayed Cricket Stadium, Abu Dhabi
Umpires: Ian Gould (Eng) and Bruce Oxenford (Aus)
Player of the match: Ajaz Patel (NZ)

- New Zealand won the toss and elected to bat.
- Ajaz Patel (NZ) made his Test debut.
- Neil Wagner (NZ) took his 150th wicket in Tests.
- Hasan Ali (Pak) took his first five-wicket haul in Tests.
- Asad Shafiq (Pak) scored his 4,000th run in Tests.
- Ajaz Patel became the ninth bowler for New Zealand to take a five-wicket haul on debut in Tests.
- In terms of runs, this was New Zealand's smallest margin of victory, and the fifth-narrowest win of all time in Tests.

=== 2nd Test ===
24–28 November 2018
Scorecard

Pakistan	v	New Zealand
418/5d (167 overs); Haris Sohail 147 (421); Colin de Grandhomme 2/44 (30 overs)		90 (35.3 overs); Jeet Raval 31 (75); Yasir Shah 8/41 (12.3 overs)
		312 (112.5 overs) (f/o); Ross Taylor 82 (128); Yasir Shah 6/143 (44.5 overs)

Pakistan won by an innings and 16 runs
Dubai International Cricket Stadium, Dubai
Umpires: Bruce Oxenford (Aus) and Paul Reiffel (Aus)
Player of the match: Yasir Shah (Pak)

- Pakistan won the toss and elected to bat.
- Babar Azam (Pak) scored his first century in Tests.
- Yasir Shah's (Pak) figures of 8/41 in the first innings were the best for any bowler against New Zealand in Tests.
- Yasir Shah also became the first bowler for Pakistan, and only the second bowler overall, to take ten wickets in a single day in Tests.
- Henry Nicholls (NZ) scored his 1,000th run in Tests.
- Yasir Shah's match figures of 14/184 were the best by a Pakistani spin bowler in Tests, the second-best figures by any bowler for Pakistan in Tests, and the most wickets by a single bowler against New Zealand in a Test match.

=== 3rd Test ===
3–7 December 2018
Scorecard

New Zealand	v	Pakistan
274 (116.1 overs); Kane Williamson 89 (176); Bilal Asif 5/65 (30.1 overs)		348 (135 overs); Azhar Ali 134 (297); William Somerville 4/75 (36 overs)
353/7d (113 overs); Kane Williamson 139 (283); Yasir Shah 4/129 (39 overs)		156 (56.1 overs); Babar Azam 51 (114); Tim Southee 3/42 (12 overs)

New Zealand won by 123 runs
Sheikh Zayed Cricket Stadium, Abu Dhabi
Umpires: Ian Gould (Eng) and Paul Reiffel (Aus)
Player of the match: Kane Williamson (NZ)

- New Zealand won the toss and elected to bat.
- Shaheen Afridi (Pak) and William Somerville (NZ) both made their Test debuts.
- Mohammad Hafeez (Pak) played in his last Test.
- BJ Watling (NZ) scored his 3,000th run in Tests.
- Yasir Shah (Pak) became the fastest bowler, in terms of matches played, to take 200 wickets in Tests (33).
- Babar Azam (Pak) scored his 1,000th run in Tests.
