= English cricket team against Pakistan in the UAE in 2015–16 =

International cricket tour

	Pakistan	England
- Dates: 5 October 2015 – 30 November 2015
Captains	Misbah-ul-Haq (Tests); Azhar Ali (ODIs); Shahid Afridi (T20Is)	Alastair Cook (Tests); Eoin Morgan (ODIs and T20Is)

Test series
- Result: Pakistan won the 3-match series 2–0
Most runs	Mohammad Hafeez (380)	Alastair Cook (450)
Most wickets	Yasir Shah (15)	James Anderson (13)
- Player of the series: Yasir Shah (Pak)

One Day International series
- Results: England won the 4-match series 3–1
Most runs	Mohammad Hafeez (184)	Jos Buttler (177)
Most wickets	Mohammad Irfan (7)	Chris Woakes (8)
- Player of the series: Jos Buttler (Eng)

Twenty20 International series
- Results: England won the 3-match series 3–0
Most runs	Shoaib Malik (101)	James Vince (125)
Most wickets	Shahid Afridi (5); Sohail Tanvir (5)	Liam Plunkett (6)
- Player of the series: James Vince (Eng)

The English cricket team toured the United Arab Emirates (UAE) to play Pakistan in October and November 2015. The Pakistan cricket team played their 'home' fixtures in the UAE due to ongoing security concerns in Pakistan since the 2009 attack on the Sri Lanka national cricket team.

The tour consisted of three Test matches, four One Day Internationals and three Twenty20 Internationals. They also played two two-day tour matches against a Pakistan A side, a 50-over match against Hong Kong, and a Twenty20 match against the United Arab Emirates. Pakistan played a 50-over match against Nepal and a 20-over match against Hong Kong.

== Squads ==
Tests		ODIs		T20Is	
Pakistan	England	Pakistan	England	Pakistan	England
Misbah-ul-Haq (c); Ahmed Shehzad; Shan Masood; Azhar Ali; Mohammad Hafeez; Fawad Alam; Asad Shafiq; Younis Khan; Sarfaraz Ahmed; Yasir Shah; Zulfiqar Babar; Wahab Riaz; Imran Khan; Rahat Ali; Junaid Khan; Shoaib Malik; Bilal Asif	Alastair Cook (c); Moeen Ali; James Anderson; ~~Zafar Ansari~~; Jonny Bairstow (wk); Ian Bell; Stuart Broad; Jos Buttler (wk); ~~Steven Finn~~; Alex Hales; Liam Plunkett; Adil Rashid; Joe Root; Ben Stokes; James Taylor; Mark Wood; Samit Patel; Chris Jordan	Azhar Ali (c); Ahmed Shehzad; Mohammad Hafeez; Shoaib Malik; Babar Azam; Sarfaraz Ahmed; Mohammad Rizwan; ~~Imad Wasim~~; Anwar Ali; Wahab Riaz; Aamer Yamin; Yasir Shah; Younis Khan; Rahat Ali; Mohammad Irfan; Zafar Gohar; Bilal Asif; Iftikhar Ahmed	Eoin Morgan (c); Moeen Ali; Jonny Bairstow (wk); Sam Billings (wk); Jos Buttler (wk); ~~Steven Finn~~; Alex Hales; Adil Rashid; Joe Root; Jason Roy; James Taylor; Reece Topley; David Willey; Chris Woakes; Liam Plunkett; Chris Jordan	Shahid Afridi (c); Iftikhar Ahmed; Sarfaraz Ahmed; Anwar Ali; Bilal Asif; Mohammad Hafeez; Mohammad Irfan; Imran Khan; Rafatullah Mohmand; Shoaib Malik; Sohaib Maqsood; Wahab Riaz; Mohammad Rizwan; Ahmed Shehzad; Sohail Tanvir; ~~Imad Wasim~~; Aamer Yamin; Umar Akmal	Eoin Morgan (c); Moeen Ali; Sam Billings (wk); Jos Buttler (wk); Alex Hales; Chris Jordan; Stephen Parry; Adil Rashid; Joe Root; Jason Roy; Reece Topley; James Vince; David Willey; Chris Woakes; Liam Plunkett

England's Zafar Ansari was ruled out of the Test series following a hand injury. He was replaced by Samit Patel. Shoaib Malik was added to Pakistan's Test squad on 6 October. England's Steven Finn was ruled out of the tour with a foot injury and was replaced in the Test and ODI squads by Chris Jordan. Pakistan's Bilal Asif was added to the Test squad on 19 October after undergoing an evaluation on his bowling action. Pakistan's Imad Wasim was ruled out of the ODI and T20I matches due to hand injury. Umar Akmal was added to Pakistan's T20I squad, after being cleared by the Pakistan Cricket Board.

== Tour matches ==
=== Two-day: Pakistan A vs England XI ===
5–6 October 2015
Scorecard

England XI	v	Pakistan A
286/5d (90 overs); Jonny Bairstow 66* 112; Zafar Gohar 3/72 (22 overs)		216/5 (90 overs); Iftikhar Ahmed 92* (209); Moeen Ali 3/41 (22 overs)

Match drawn
Sharjah Cricket Association Stadium, Sharjah
Umpires: Iftikhar Ali (UAE) and Shozab Raza (Pak)

- England XI won the toss and elected to bat.
- 15 players per side (11 batting, 11 fielding).

=== Two-day: Pakistan A vs England XI ===
8–9 October 2015
Scorecard

Pakistan A	v	England XI
192/9d (87.5 overs); Adnan Akmal 74* (149); Steven Finn 4/16 (15 overs)		198 (78 overs); James Taylor 61 (123); Mir Hamza 4/34 (16 overs)

Match drawn
Sharjah Cricket Association Stadium, Sharjah
Umpires: Iftikhar Ali (UAE) and Shozab Raza (Pak)
Player of the match: Adnan Akmal (Pakistan A)

- England XI won the toss and elected to field.
- 15 players per side (12 batting, 11 fielding).

=== One-day: England XI vs Hong Kong ===
8 November 2015
Scorecard

England XI; 342/8 (50 overs)	v	Hong Kong; 173 (40.2 overs)
Moeen Ali 71 (36); Tanwir Afzal 2/40 (10 overs)		Babar Hayat 78 (81); David Willey 4/43 (10 overs)

England XI won by 163 runs
Sheikh Zayed Stadium Nursery 1, Abu Dhabi
Umpires: Ahsan Raza (Pak) and Khalid Elahi (UAE)

- England XI won the toss and elected to bat.
- 13 players per side (11 batting, 11 fielding).

=== Tour match: Pakistanis vs Nepal ===
8 November 2015 (D/N)
Scorecard

Pakistanis; 326/6 (50 overs)	v	Nepal; 205/5 (50 overs)
Azhar Ali 73 (73); Basant Regmi 2/73 (9 overs)		Anil Mandal 61 (109); Anwar Ali 2/56 (10 overs)

Pakistanis won by 121 runs
Sheikh Zayed Stadium Nursery 2, Abu Dhabi
Umpires: Akbar Ali (UAE) and Shozab Raza (Pak)

- Nepal won the toss and elected to field.

=== Twenty20: Pakistanis vs Hong Kong ===
23 November 2015
Scorecard

Pakistanis; 167/7 (20 overs)	v	Hong Kong; 103 (17.1 overs)
Mohammad Rizwan 55* (38); Haseeb Amjad 3/38 (4 overs)		Mark Chapman 50 (39); Bilal Asif 2/13 (3 overs)

Pakistanis won by 64 runs
ICC Academy, Dubai
Umpires: Ahsan Raza (Pak) and Shozab Raza (Pak)

- Pakistanis won the toss and elected to bat.

=== Twenty20: United Arab Emirates vs England XI ===
23 November 2015
Scorecard

England XI; 174/6 (20 overs)	v	United Arab Emirates; 95/9 (20 overs)
Jason Roy 59 (29); Imran Haider 2/23 (4 overs)		Fahad Tariq 23 (22); Moeen Ali 4/11 (3 overs)

England XI won by 79 runs
Sheikh Zayed Cricket Stadium, Abu Dhabi
Umpires: Rabiul Hoque (UAE) and Zaheer-ul-Haq (UAE)

- United Arab Emirates won the toss and elected to field.
- England XI had 15 players (11 batting, 11 fielding) and United Arab Emirates had 17 players (11 batting, 11 fielding).

== Test series ==
=== 1st Test ===
13 – 17 October 2015
Scorecard

Pakistan	v	England
523/8d (151.1 overs); Shoaib Malik 245 (420); Ben Stokes 4/57 (14.1 overs)		598/9d (206 overs); Alastair Cook 263 (528); Wahab Riaz 3/125 (37 overs)
173 (57.5 overs); Misbah-ul-Haq 51 (111); Adil Rashid 5/64 (18.5 overs)		74/4 (11 overs); Joe Root 32* (29); Shoaib Malik 2/25 (4 overs)

Match drawn
Sheikh Zayed Cricket Stadium, Abu Dhabi
Umpires: Bruce Oxenford (Aus) and Paul Reiffel (Aus)
Player of the match: Alastair Cook (Eng)

- Pakistan won the toss and elected to bat.
- Bad light stopped play towards the end of days 4 and 5.
- Adil Rashid (Eng) made his Test debut.
- Younis Khan became Pakistan's leading run-scorer in Test cricket, overtaking Javed Miandad. Miandad's record had stood for 22 years.
- Alastair Cook batted for 836 minutes, the longest innings by an England player in Test history.

=== 2nd Test ===
22 – 26 October 2015
Scorecard

Pakistan	v	England
378 (118.5 overs); Misbah-ul-Haq 102 (197); Mark Wood 3/39 (19.5 overs)		242 (75.2 overs); Joe Root 88 (141); Wahab Riaz 4/66 (19 overs)
354/6d (95 overs); Younis Khan 118 (211); James Anderson 2/22 (15 overs)		312 (137.3 overs); Joe Root 71 (171); Yasir Shah 4/87 (41.3 overs)

Pakistan won by 178 runs
Dubai International Cricket Stadium, Dubai
Umpires: Bruce Oxenford (Aus) and Paul Reiffel (Aus)
Player of the match: Wahab Riaz (Pak)

- Pakistan won the toss and elected to bat.
- Younis Khan became the first Pakistani cricketer to pass 9,000 Test runs when scored 47 in the second innings.
- Joe Root (Eng) became the youngest English cricketer to pass 3,000 Test runs when he scored 71 in the second innings.

=== 3rd Test ===
1–5 November 2015
Scorecard

Pakistan	v	England
234 (85.1 overs); Misbah-ul-Haq 71 (160); James Anderson 4/17 (15.1 overs)		306 (126.5 overs); James Taylor 76 (161); Shoaib Malik 4/33 (9.5 overs)
355 (118.2 overs); Mohammad Hafeez 151 (266); Stuart Broad 3/44 (23 overs)		156 (60.3 overs); Alastair Cook 63 (164); Yasir Shah 4/44 (17.3 overs)

Pakistan won by 127 runs
Sharjah Cricket Association Stadium, Sharjah
Umpires: Chris Gaffaney (NZ) and Bruce Oxenford (Aus)
Player of the match: Mohammad Hafeez (Pak)

- Pakistan won the toss and elected to bat.
- This was the last Test match for Shoaib Malik (Pak).

== ODI series ==
=== 1st ODI ===
11 November 2015
15:00 (D/N)
Scorecard

England; 216 (49.4 overs)	v	Pakistan; 217/4 (43.4 overs)
Eoin Morgan 76 (96); Mohammad Irfan 3/35 (10 overs)		Mohammed Hafeez 102* (130); Reece Topley 3/26 (9 overs)

Pakistan won by 6 wickets
Sheikh Zayed Cricket Stadium, Abu Dhabi
Umpires: Johan Cloete (SA) and Ahsan Raza (Pak)
Player of the match: Mohammed Hafeez (Pak)

- England won the toss and elected to bat.
- This match was Younis Khan's (Pak) final ODI game.

=== 2nd ODI ===
13 November 2015
15:00 (D/N)
Scorecard

England; 283/5 (50 overs)	v	Pakistan; 188 (45.5 overs)
Alex Hales 109 (117); Wahab Riaz 3/43 (10 overs)		Sarfaraz Ahmed 64 (76); Chris Woakes 4/33 (8 overs)

England won by 95 runs
Sheikh Zayed Cricket Stadium, Abu Dhabi
Umpires: Chris Gaffaney (NZ) and Shozab Raza (Pak)
Player of the match: Alex Hales (Eng)

- England won the toss and elected to bat.
- Iftikhar Ahmed (Pak) made his ODI debut.
- Alex Hales (Eng) scored his maiden ODI century.

=== 3rd ODI ===
17 November 2015
15:00 (D/N)
Scorecard

Pakistan; 208 (49.5 overs)	v	England; 210/4 (41 overs)
Mohammad Hafeez 45 (71); Chris Woakes 4/40 (9.5 overs)		James Taylor 67* (69); Zafar Gohar 2/54 (10 overs)

England won by 6 wickets
Sharjah Cricket Association Stadium, Sharjah
Umpires: Johan Cloete (SA) and Shozab Raza (Pak)
Player of the match: James Taylor (Eng)

- Pakistan won the toss and elected to bat.
- Zafar Gohar (Pak) made his ODI debut.

=== 4th ODI ===
20 November 2015
15:00 (D/N)
Scorecard

England; 355/5 (50 overs)	v	Pakistan; 271 (40.4 overs)
Jos Buttler 116* (52); Azhar Ali 2/26 (5 overs)		Shoaib Malik 52 (34); Moeen Ali 3/53 (9.4 overs)

England won by 84 runs
Dubai International Cricket Stadium, Dubai
Umpires: Chris Gaffaney (NZ) and Ahsan Raza (Pak)
Player of the match: Jos Buttler (Eng)

- England won the toss and elected to bat.
- The 46-ball century by Jos Buttler is the fastest ODI century by an English batsman. The eight sixes scored by Buttler in his innings is also the highest by an English player.
- This is the highest ODI total by England away from home.
- Jason Roy (Eng) scored his maiden ODI century.

== T20I series ==
=== 1st T20I ===
26 November 2015
20:00
Scorecard

England; 160/5 (20 overs)	v	Pakistan; 146 (20 overs)
Sam Billings 53 (25); Sohail Tanvir 2/31 (4 overs)		Sohail Tanvir 25* (22); Liam Plunkett 3/21 (4 overs)

England won by 14 runs
Dubai International Cricket Stadium, Dubai
Umpires: Ahsan Raza (Pak) and Shozab Raza (Pak)
Player of the match: Sam Billings (Eng)

- England won the toss and elected to bat.
- James Vince (Eng) and Rafatullah Mohmand (Pak) made their T20I debuts.

=== 2nd T20I ===
27 November 2015
20:00
Scorecard

England; 172/8 (20 overs)	v	Pakistan; 169/8 (20 overs)
James Vince 38 (24); Shahid Afridi 3/15 (4 overs)		Ahmed Shehzad 28 (18); Liam Plunkett 3/33 (4 overs)

England won by 3 runs
Dubai International Cricket Stadium, Dubai
Umpires: Shozab Raza (Pak) and Ahmed Shahab (Pak)
Player of the match: Liam Plunkett (Eng)

- England won the toss and elected to bat.

=== 3rd T20I ===
30 November 2015
20:00
Scorecard

England; 154/8 (20 overs)	v	Pakistan; 154/7 (20 overs)
James Vince 46 (45); Shahid Afridi 2/19 (4 overs)		Shoaib Malik 75 (54); David Willey 3/36 (4 overs)

Match tied (England won the Super Over)
Sharjah Cricket Association Stadium, Sharjah
Umpires: Ahsan Raza (Pak) and Ahmed Shahab (Pak)
Player of the match: Shoaib Malik (Pak)

- England won the toss and elected to bat.
- Aamer Yamin (Pak) made his T20I debut.
