= Pakistani cricket team in Zimbabwe in 2015–16 =

International cricket tour

	Zimbabwe	Pakistan
- Dates: 24 September – 5 October 2015
Captains	Elton Chigumbura	Azhar Ali (Note: Sarfaraz Ahmed was named captain for the 3rd ODI after Azhar Ali was ruled out due to a foot injury.) (ODIs); Shahid Afridi (T20Is)

One Day International series
- Results: Pakistan won the 3-match series 2–1
Most runs	Chamu Chibhabha (150)	Shoaib Malik (161)
Most wickets	Tinashe Panyangara (4)	Yasir Shah (6)
- Player of the series: Shoaib Malik (Pak)

Twenty20 International series
- Results: Pakistan won the 2-match series 2–0
Most runs	Sean Williams (54)	Umar Akmal (52)
Most wickets	Chamu Chibhabha (3)	Imad Wasim (5)
- Player of the series: Imad Wasim (Pak)

The Pakistan cricket team toured Zimbabwe between 24 September and 5 October 2015 to play the series which consisted of three One Day International (ODI) matches and two Twenty20 International (T20I) matches. Pakistan won the T20I series 2–0 and the ODI series 2–1.

== Squads ==
ODIs		T20Is	
Zimbabwe	Pakistan	Zimbabwe	Pakistan
Elton Chigumbura (c); Brian Chari; Chamu Chibhabha; Graeme Cremer; Craig Ervine; Luke Jongwe; Neville Madziva; Hamilton Masakadza; Christopher Mpofu; Richmond Mutumbami; Taurai Muzarabani; John Nyumbu; Tinashe Panyangara; Sikandar Raza; Prosper Utseya; Malcolm Waller; Sean Williams	Azhar Ali (c); Ahmed Shehzad; Mohammad Hafeez; Sohaib Maqsood; Shoaib Malik; Babar Azam; Asad Shafiq; Sarfaraz Ahmed; Mohammad Rizwan; Imad Wasim; ~~Anwar Ali~~; Wahab Riaz; Yasir Shah; Rahat Ali; Mohammad Irfan; Aamer Yamin; Bilal Asif	Elton Chigumbura (c); Chamu Chibhabha; Graeme Cremer; Craig Ervine; Luke Jongwe; Neville Madziva; Hamilton Masakadza; Christopher Mpofu; Richmond Mutumbami; Taurai Muzarabani; John Nyumbu; Tinashe Panyangara; Sikandar Raza; Prosper Utseya; Malcolm Waller; Sean Williams	Shahid Afridi (c); Ahmed Shehzad; Mukhtar Ahmed; Umar Akmal; Mohammad Hafeez; Sohaib Maqsood; Shoaib Malik; Aamer Yamin; Mohammad Irfan; Bilal Asif; Wahab Riaz; Imad Wasim; Sohail Tanvir; Mohammad Rizwan; Imran Khan

Pakistan's Anwar Ali was ruled out of the ODI series with an injury and was replaced by Aamer Yamin. Bilal Asif was added to Pakistan's ODI squad on 30 September, after originally only been included in the T20I squad.

== T20I series ==
=== 1st T20I ===
27 September 2015
Scorecard

Pakistan; 136/8 (20 overs)	v	Zimbabwe; 123/9 (20 overs)
Shoaib Malik 35 (24); Chamu Chibhabha 3/18 (3 overs)		Elton Chigumbura 31 (28); Imad Wasim 4/11 (4 overs)

Pakistan won by 13 runs
Harare Sports Club, Harare
Umpires: Jeremiah Matibiri (Zim) and Russell Tiffin (Zim)
Player of the match: Imad Wasim (Pak)

- Pakistan won the toss and elected to bat.
- Imran Khan (Pak) and Luke Jongwe (Zim) made their T20I debuts.

=== 2nd T20I ===
29 September 2015
Scorecard

Pakistan; 136/6 (20 overs)	v	Zimbabwe; 121/7 (20 overs)
Umar Akmal 38* (28); Luke Jongwe 2/24 (4 overs)		Sean Williams 39* (35); Mohammad Irfan 2/25 (4 overs)

Pakistan won by 15 runs
Harare Sports Club, Harare
Umpires: Langton Rusere (Zim) and Russell Tiffin (Zim)
Player of the match: Umar Akmal (Pak)

- Pakistan won the toss and elected to bat.

== ODI series ==
=== 1st ODI ===
1 October 2015
Scorecard

Pakistan; 259/6 (50 overs)	v	Zimbabwe; 128 (37 overs)
Mohammad Rizwan 75* (74); John Nyumbu 1/39 (9 overs)		Sean Williams 26 (31); Yasir Shah 6/26 (9 overs)

Pakistan won by 131 runs
Harare Sports Club, Harare
Umpires: Ruchira Palliyaguruge (SL) and Russell Tiffin (Zim)
Player of the match: Yasir Shah (Pak)

- Zimbabwe won the toss and elected to field.
- Brian Chari (Zim) and Aamer Yamin (Pak) made their ODI debuts.

=== 2nd ODI ===
3 October 2015
Scorecard

Zimbabwe; 276/6 (50 overs)	v	Pakistan; 256/8 (48 overs)
Chamu Chibhabha 90 (125); Wahab Riaz 4/63 (10 overs)		Shoaib Malik 96* (106); Tinashe Panyangara 2/44 (9 overs)

Zimbabwe won by 5 runs (DLS method)
Harare Sports Club, Harare
Umpires: Jeremiah Matibiri (Zim) and Ruchira Palliyaguruge (SL)
Player of the match: Elton Chigumbura (Zim)

- Pakistan won the toss and elected to field.
- Rain stopped play in the 43rd over of Pakistan's innings and bad light prevented further play. The target was set at 262 runs from 48 overs.
- Bilal Asif (Pak) made his ODI debut.

=== 3rd ODI ===
5 October 2015
Scorecard

Zimbabwe; 161 (38.5 overs)	v	Pakistan; 162/3 (34 overs)
Richmond Mutumbami 67 (85); Bilal Asif 5/25 (10 overs)		Bilal Asif 38 (39); Tinashe Panyangara 1/22 (7 overs)

Pakistan won by 7 wickets
Harare Sports Club, Harare
Umpires: Jeremiah Matibiri (Zim) and Ruchira Palliyaguruge (SL)
Player of the match: Bilal Asif (Pak)

- Pakistan won the toss and elected to field.
- Sarfaraz Ahmed captained Pakistan for the first time in international cricket.
