= Pakistani cricket team in Scotland in 2013 =

	Scotland	Pakistan
- Dates: 17 May – 19 May
Captains	Kyle Coetzer	Misbah-ul-Haq

One Day International series
- Results: Pakistan won the 2-match series 1–0

The Pakistani cricket team toured Scotland from 17 May to 19 May 2013. The tour consisted of two One Day Internationals (ODIs).

== Squads ==
ODIs
Pakistan	Scotland
Misbah-ul-Haq (Captain); Mohammad Hafeez (Vice Captain); Kamran Akmal (Wicket Keeper); Abdur Rehman; Asad Ali; Asad Shafiq; Ehsan Adil; Imran Farhat; Junaid Khan; Mohammad Irfan; Nasir Jamshed; Saeed Ajmal; Shoaib Malik; Umar Amin; Wahab Riaz

== ODI series ==
=== 1st ODI ===
17 May
10:45
Scorecard

Pakistan; 231/7 (50 overs)	v	Scotland; 135 (39.4 overs)
Misbah-ul-Haq 83* (80); Majid Haq 3/39 (10 overs)		Kyle Coetzer 32 (60); Junaid Khan 3/19 (7 overs)

Pakistan won by 96 runs
Grange Cricket Club Ground, Raeburn Place, Edinburgh
Umpires: Richard Kettleborough (Eng) and Ian Ramage (Sco)

- Pakistan won the toss and elected to bat.
- Ehsan Adil (Pakistan) and Neil Carter (Scotland) made ODI debuts.

=== 2nd ODI ===
19 May
10:45
Scorecard

Scotland	v	Pakistan

Match abandoned without a ball bowled
Grange Cricket Club Ground, Raeburn Place, Edinburgh
Umpires: Richard Kettleborough (Eng) and Ian Ramage (Sco)

- No toss
