= Neil Wagner =

New Zealand cricketer (born 1986)

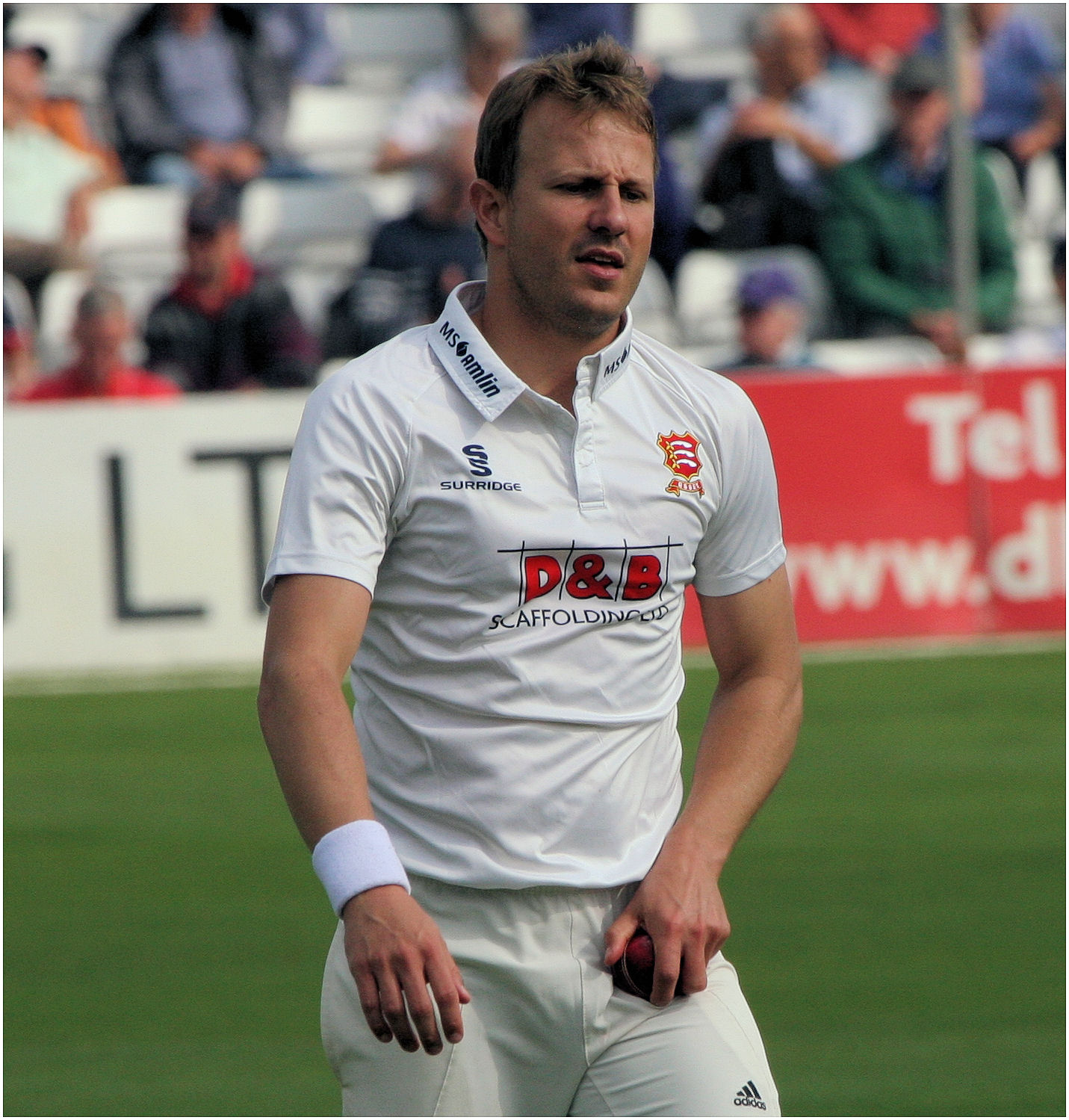
- Wagner playing for Essex in 2017

Personal information
- Full name: Neil Wagner
- Born: 13 March 1986 (age 40); Pretoria, Transvaal, South Africa
- Batting: Left-handed
- Bowling: Left-arm fast-medium
- Role: Bowler

International information
- National side: New Zealand (2012–2024)
- Test debut (cap 256): 25 July 2012 v West Indies
- Last Test: 13 February 2024 v South Africa

Domestic team information
- Years: Team
- 2005/06–2007/08: Northerns
- 2006/07–2007/08: Titans
- 2008/09–2017/18: Otago
- 2014: Northamptonshire
- 2016: Lancashire
- 2017–2018: Essex
- 2018/19–2024/25: Northern Districts
- 2023: Somerset
- 2024–2025: Durham

Career statistics
| Competition | Test | FC | LA | T20 |
|---|---|---|---|---|
| Matches | 64 | 213 | 122 | 94 |
| Runs scored | 875 | 3,834 | 693 | 279 |
| Batting average | 14.58 | 17.42 | 12.37 | 9.96 |
| 100s/50s | 0/1 | 0/11 | 0/0 | 0/0 |
| Top score | 66* | 72 | 45* | 36 |
| Balls bowled | 13,725 | 43,264 | 5,959 | 1,895 |
| Wickets | 260 | 851 | 185 | 103 |
| Bowling average | 27.57 | 27.07 | 28.97 | 26.52 |
| 5 wickets in innings | 9 | 37 | 3 | 0 |
| 10 wickets in match | 0 | 2 | 0 | 0 |
| Best bowling | 7/39 | 7/39 | 5/34 | 4/33 |
| Catches/stumpings | 19/– | 70/– | 21/– | 15/– |
Medal record
Men's Cricket
Representing New Zealand
ICC World Test Championship
| Winner | 2019–2021 |
- Source: ESPNcricinfo, 23 July 2025

Neil Wagner (born 13 March 1986) is a former professional cricketer who played as a left-arm fast-medium bowler. He represented New Zealand in 64 Test matches from 2012 to 2024. As of June 2026, Wagner is the fifth-highest wicket-taker in New Zealand's Test cricket history. He was also a member of the New Zealand squad that won the 2019–2021 ICC World Test Championship.

Born in South Africa, he played domestic cricket for Northerns and Titans between 2005 and 2008. After relocating to New Zealand, Wagner represented Otago from 2008 to 2018, followed by Northern Districts from 2018 to 2025. Over the course of his career, he also played for several English county cricket clubs between 2014 and 2025.

== Early career ==
Wagner was born at Pretoria and attended Afrikaanse Hoër Seunskool as a high school student where he played for the 1st team alongside AB de Villiers and Faf du Plessis. He is a left-handed batsman and left-arm medium-fast bowler who toured Zimbabwe and Bangladesh with South African Academy teams and was twelfth man in two Test matches for South Africa.

In 2008, he moved to Dunedin, New Zealand to play domestic cricket for Otago in 2008. He played a total of 190 matches for Otago and took a total of 579 wickets.

In June 2009, he was awarded a place in the New Zealand Emerging Players team under Peter Fulton, and eventually made his test debut for New Zealand against the West Indies in 2012. He played 64 Test matches for New Zealand.

== World record ==
On 6 April 2011, Wagner took four wickets in four balls against Wellington when he dismissed Stewart Rhodes, Joe Austin-Smellie, Jeetan Patel and Ili Tugaga. He then took the wicket of Mark Gillespie with the sixth ball of the same over: five wickets in one 6-ball over, the first time this has been achieved in first-class cricket. His bowling figures for the innings were 6/36, his personal best at that time.

== International career ==
Wagner was born to South African parents but he has New Zealand heritage through his grandmother.

After an uneven start to his Test career against the West Indies and his birth country, South Africa, Wagner established himself as a reliable third seamer for New Zealand team during their 2013 home and away series against England, taking 19 wickets in five Tests. He produced consistent performances over the next two years, including a man-of-the-match eight-wicket haul against India at Eden Park. Despite that, he struggled to maintain his place in the team and was not selected for either of New Zealand's two Tests against England in 2015.

Wagner returned to the team during the Sri Lankan tour of New Zealand in late 2015. He produced a series of strong performances, and New Zealand comfortably won the series. Before the Test, skipper Brendon McCullum described Wagner as his "workhorse".

Those performances earned him another call-up for the second Test against Australia. Wagner bowled well, taking seven wickets including six in the first innings. Since then, Wagner has been a regular starter in the New Zealand Test team.

Wagner continued his fine form during New Zealand's tour of Zimbabwe in 2016, and won the player of the series award. He took 11 wickets in the two-match series, including a five-wicket haul in the first Test. New Zealand then toured Wagner's homeland of South Africa. In the second Test, although New Zealand were soundly beaten, Wagner again led the attack, taking his fourth five-wicket bag.

In April 2017, Wagner was named in New Zealand's One Day International (ODI) squad for the 2017 Ireland Tri-Nation Series.

On 1 December 2017, Wagner became the opening partner to Trent Boult, because Tim Southee was injured, and claimed his best figures of 7/39, which was also a New Zealand record, to claim 7/39 within a day, and within two sessions of play.

In May 2018, he was one of twenty players to be awarded a new contract for the 2018–19 season by New Zealand Cricket. In November 2018, in the second match against Pakistan, he took his 150th Test wicket. In December 2019, in the second Test against Australia, Wagner took his 200th Test wicket, and finished the 2019/20 home season ranked as the number two Test bowler in the International Cricket Council's world rankings.

In December 2020, in the second match against the West Indies, Wagner played in his 50th Test.

In May 2021, Wagner was named in New Zealand's squad for the Test series against England and the World Test Championship final against India. He played in all three Tests, finishing the tour with 10 wickets, including three in New Zealand's World Test Championship victory. He retired from playing test cricket at the age of 37 years in February 2024. He said of retirement: "I've enjoyed every single moment of playing Test cricket for the Black Caps and am proud of everything we've been able to achieve as a team. The friendships and bonds built over my career are what I'll cherish the most and I want to thank everyone who's played a part in where I am today. My teammates have always meant the world to me and all I've ever wanted to do was what was best for the team - I hope that's the legacy I will leave".

== Domestic career ==
After playing for Otago from 2008, Wagner moved north and joined Northern Districts in 2018. He finished his career with Northern Districts in 2025. His final game was against Otago, where Northern Districts won and as a result won the Plunket Shield for the first time since 2012. Wagner took five wickets and said of the game "Yeah, cherry on the top, like it's just, couldn't have asked for a better ending. Plunket Shield is one of the only things I've never been able to achieve as a team, and to do that in your last game here is definitely a tick off the bucket list and a pretty special day. It's a nice way to end what has been a pretty special time in New Zealand". He has signed to play cricket for Durham between June and September 2025.
