= Pakistani cricket team in Australia in 2009–10 =

Pakistan cricket team in Australia in 2009–10
	Pakistan	Australia
- Dates: 19 December 2009 – 5 February 2010
Captains	Mohammad Yousuf; Shahid Afridi (5th ODI); Shoaib Malik (T20Is)	Ricky Ponting; Michael Clarke (T20Is)

Test series
- Result: Australia won the 3-match series 3–0
Most runs	Salman Butt (280)	Ricky Ponting (378)
Most wickets	Mohammad Asif (13)	Nathan Hauritz (18)
- Player of the series: Shane Watson (Aus)

One Day International series
- Results: Australia won the 5-match series 5–0
Most runs	Umar Akmal (187)	Cameron White (245)
Most wickets	Mohammad Asif (6); Shahid Afridi (6); Naved-ul-Hasan (6)	Clint McKay (14)
- Player of the series: Ryan Harris (Aus)

Twenty20 International series
- Results: Australia won the 1-match series 1–0
Most runs	Kamran Akmal (64)	David Hussey (40)
Most wickets	Umar Gul (3)	Shaun Tait (3)
- Player of the series: Shaun Tait (Aus)

The Pakistan cricket team toured Australia for a 3-match Test series, a 5-match ODI series, and 1 Twenty20 International from 19 December 2009 to 5 February 2010.

During the final ODI match, the stand-in captain, Shahid Afridi, was involved in an alleged ball tampering incident, when he was seen biting the cricket ball. He was immediately called by the match referee after the match was over. There Afridi pleaded guilty to ball tampering and he was banned from two Twenty20 Internationals.

During the Twenty20 International, Australian fast bowler Shaun Tait bowled the fastest delivery ever recorded in Australia (160.7 km/h). Tait achieved the feat on the second ball of his first over. It is also the third fastest delivery ever recorded behind Brett Lee and Shoaib Akhtar.

Australia registered a clean sweep by winning the Test series 3–0, the ODI series 5–0 and the only T20I.

During the tour, speculation was rife that captain Mohammad Yousuf was involved in a power struggle with former skippers Younis Khan and Shoaib Malik and that team morale was low.

Following the tour, the Pakistan Cricket Board conducted an inquiry and announced that Yousuf and Younis would not be selected for the country in future, implying a life exclusion, and banned Malik and Rana Naved-ul-Hasan for a year each. Afridi and the brothers Umar and Kamran Akmal were all fined and put on probation for six months. Kamran had been dropped after the second Test because of a string of dropped catches, but spoke out against the decision and insisted that he was not dropped, while Umar was accused of disruption by feigning injury in an attempt to go on strike in solidarity.

== Squads ==
Tests		ODIs		T20Is	
Australia	Pakistan	Australia	Pakistan	Australia	Pakistan
Ricky Ponting (c); Michael Clarke; Brad Haddin (wk); Simon Katich; Michael Hussey; Shane Watson; Nathan Hauritz; Mitchell Johnson; Peter Siddle; Phillip Hughes; Marcus North; Doug Bollinger; Clint McKay	Mohammad Yousuf (c); Salman Butt; Khurram Manzoor; Imran Farhat; Misbah-ul-Haq; Shoaib Malik; Fawad Alam; Faisal Iqbal; Kamran Akmal (wk); Danish Kaneria; Saeed Ajmal; Umar Gul; Mohammad Asif; Mohammad Amir; Abdur Rauf; Umar Akmal; Mohammad Sami; Sarfraz Ahmed (wk)	Ricky Ponting (c); Michael Clarke; Doug Bollinger; Nathan Hauritz; Mike Hussey; Mitchell Johnson; Cameron White; Clint McKay; Brad Haddin (wk); James Hopes; Peter Siddle; Shane Watson; Shaun Marsh; Adam Voges; Ryan Harris; Shaun Tait	Mohammad Yousuf (c); Shahid Afridi; Umar Akmal; Imran Farhat; Fawad Alam; Younis Khan; Saeed Ajmal; Umar Gul; Kamran Akmal (wk); Shoaib Malik; Khalid Latif; Mohammad Amir; Naved-ul-Hasan; Sarfraz Ahmed (wk); Salman Butt; Rao Iftikhar; Mohammad Asif	Michael Clarke (c); Cameron White; Travis Birt; Dirk Nannes; Ryan Harris; David Hussey; Mitchell Johnson; Shaun Marsh; Brad Haddin (wk); Steve Smith; Shaun Tait; David Warner; Shane Watson	Shoaib Malik (c); Fawad Alam; Iftikhar Anjum; Mohammad Amir; Imran Nazir; Khalid Latif; Mohammad Asif; Naved-ul-Hasan; Kamran Akmal (wk); Saeed Ajmal; Salman Butt; Sarfraz Ahmed (wk); Umar Akmal; Umar Gul

== Tour matches ==
=== 3-day tour match: Tasmania v Pakistanis - 19–21 December ===
19 – 21 December
Scorecard

Pakistan	v	Tasmania
437 (127.4 overs); Salman Butt 153 (266); JJ Krejza 3/162 (28.4 overs)		193 (67.6 overs); GJ Bailey 50 (91); Saeed Ajmal 4/84 (26 overs)
141/4 (33.0 overs); Umar Akmal 55 (50); JJ Krejza 1/27 (5 overs)

Match drawn
Bellerive Oval, Hobart, Australia
Umpires: Steven John (Aus) and Paul Reiffel (Aus)

- Tasmania won the toss and elected to field.

== Test series ==
=== 1st Test ===
26 – 30 December
Scorecard

Australia	v	Pakistan
454/5d (128 overs); SM Katich 98 (226); Mohammad Asif 2/86 (27 overs)		258 (99 overs); Misbah-ul-Haq 65* (120); MG Johnson 3/36 (22 overs)
225/8d (73.1 overs); SR Watson 120* (220); Mohammad Amir 5/79 (24 overs)		251 (72 overs); Mohammad Yousuf 61 (140); NM Hauritz 5/101 (24 overs)

Australia won by 170 runs
Melbourne Cricket Ground, Melbourne
Attendance: 60,000 (Day1), 40,000 (Day2), 37,000 (Day3)
Umpires: Billy Doctrove (WI) and Rudi Koertzen (SA)
Player of the match: SR Watson (Aus)

- Australia won the toss and elected to bat

=== 2nd Test ===
3 – 7 January
Scorecard

Australia	v	Pakistan
127 (44.2 overs); MG Johnson 38 (57); Mohammad Asif 6/41 (20 overs)		333 (96.5 overs); Salman Butt 71 (164); DE Bollinger 4/72 (21.5 overs)
381 (125.4 overs); MEK Hussey 134* (284); Danish Kaneria 5/151 (47.5 overs)		139 (38 overs); Umar Akmal 49 (81); NM Hauritz 5/53 (12 overs)

Australia won by 36 runs
Sydney Cricket Ground, Sydney, Australia
Umpires: Asoka de Silva (SL) & Billy Doctrove (WI)
Player of the match: MEK Hussey (Aus)

- Australia won the toss and elected to bat
- Rain delayed start of play on day 1
- Bad light ended play early on day 1
- Play resumed half-an-hour early to make up the overs lost on day 1

At an inquiry after the series was completed, the management of the Pakistan team testified that they suspected that some of the Pakistan team conspired with bookmakers in match-fixing events during this match. Pakistani wicket-keeper Kamran Akmal missed four catches and a run-out in the Australian second innings as Australia turned around a substantial first innings deficit to win the Test. However, the Australian captain Ricky Ponting stated that he "certainly had no suspicions". Several months later, Mazhar Majeed a man who had accepted a bribe to provide information about spot-fixing during Pakistan's summer tour of England, stated that the match had been fixed and that the fixers had made more than a million pounds as a result of Pakistan's loss from a commanding position. There has been no other corroboration of Majeed's statements.

=== 3rd Test ===
14 – 18 January
Scorecard

Australia	v	Pakistan
519/8d (142.5 overs); RT Ponting 209 (354); Danish Kaneria 3/189 (42.5 overs)		301 (105.4 overs); Salman Butt 102 (234); SM Katich 3/34 (10 overs)
219/5d (48.4 overs); SM Katich 100 (138); Shoaib Malik 2/16 (3.4 overs)		206 (86.2 overs); Khurram Manzoor 77 (239); PM Siddle 3/25 (15.2 overs)

Australia won by 231 runs
Bellerive Oval, Hobart, Australia
Umpires: Asoka de Silva (SL) and Rudi Koertzen (SA)
Player of the match: RT Ponting (Aus)

- Australia won the toss and elected to bat
- Sarfraz Ahmed made his test debut for Pakistan.
- Michael Clarke and Ricky Ponting scored the highest partnership vs Pakistan. (352 runs)
- Ricky Ponting scored the first double hundred in a test match at Bellerive Oval.
- Rain ended play early on Day 4.

== ODI series ==
=== 1st ODI ===
22 January 2010
13:25 (D/N)
Scorecard

Pakistan; 274 (49.4 overs)	v	Australia; 275/5 (48.3 overs)
Salman Butt 72 (81); SR Watson 4/36 (10 overs)		CL White 105 (88); Mohammad Amir 1/29 (9 overs)

Australia won by 5 wickets
Brisbane Cricket Ground, Brisbane, Australia
Umpires: EAR de Silva (SL) and RJ Tucker (Aus)
Player of the match: CL White (Aus)

- Pakistan won the toss and elected to bat.

=== 2nd ODI ===
24 January 2010
14:25 (D/N)
Scorecard

Australia; 267/6 (50 overs)	v	Pakistan; 127 (37.3 overs)
SR Watson 69 (71); Mohammad Amir 3/53 (9 overs)		Mohammad Yousuf 58 (94); CJ McKay 3/15 (7.3 overs)

Australia won by 140 runs
Sydney Cricket Ground, Sydney, Australia
Umpires: EAR de Silva (SL) and RJ Tucker (Aus)
Player of the match: SR Watson (Aus)

- Pakistan won the toss and elected to field.

=== 3rd ODI ===
26 January 2010
13:55 (D/N)
Scorecard

Australia; 286/6 (50 overs)	v	Pakistan; 246 (47.4 overs)
SE Marsh 83 (113); Naved-ul-Hasan 2/57 (10 overs)		Umar Akmal 59 (76); RJ Harris 5/43 (10 overs)

Australia won by 40 runs.
Adelaide Oval, Adelaide, Australia
Umpires: EAR de Silva (SL) and SJA Taufel (Aus)
Player of the match: RJ Harris (Aus)

- Australia won the toss and elected to bat.

=== 4th ODI ===
29 January 2010
12:20 (D/N)
Scorecard

Australia; 277/8 (50 overs)	v	Pakistan; 142 (37.5 overs)
MEK Hussey 67 (75); Mohammad Asif 3/42 (10 overs)		Umar Akmal 38 (60); RJ Harris 5/19 (9.5 overs)

Australia won by 135 runs
Western Australia Cricket Association Ground, Perth, Australia
Umpires: EAR de Silva (SL) and RJ Tucker (Aus)
Player of the match: RJ Harris (Aus)

- Australia won the toss and elected to bat.

=== 5th ODI ===
31 January 2010
12:20 (D/N)
Scorecard

Pakistan; 212 (49.3 overs)	v	Australia; 213/8 (49.2 overs)
Umar Akmal 67 (102); CJ McKay 4/35 (9.3 overs)		RT Ponting 55 (78); Shahid Afridi 2/31 (10 overs)

Australia won by 2 wickets
Western Australia Cricket Association Ground, Perth, Australia
Umpires: EAR de Silva (SL) & PR Reiffel (Aus)
Player of the match: CJ McKay (Aus)

- Pakistan won the toss and elected to bat.
- Shahid Afridi filled in as captain after Mohammad Yousuf suffered a knee injury.
- Afridi banned for two T20Is after ball-tampering incident.
- A pitch invader crash tackled Khalid Latif

== Twenty20 International series ==
5 February 2010
19:35 (D/N)
Scorecard

Australia; 127 (18.4 overs)	v	Pakistan; 125/9 (20 overs)
DJ Hussey 40 (31); Umar Gul 3/20 (3.4 overs)		Kamran Akmal 64 (33); SW Tait 3/13 (4 overs)

Australia won by 2 runs
Melbourne Cricket Ground, Melbourne, Australia Attendance: 60,100
Umpires: PR Reiffel (Aus) & RJ Tucker (Aus)
Player of the match: SW Tait (Aus)

- Australia won the toss and elected to bat.
- Travis Birt and Steve Smith made T20 debut for Australia and Imran Farhat made T20 debut for Pakistan.
- Australian fast bowler Shaun Tait bowled the quickest ball ever recorded in Australia (160.7 km/h).

== Media coverage ==
=== Television ===
- Nine Network (live) – Australia
- Geo Super (live) – Pakistan
- PTV Home (live) – Pakistan
- Sky Sports (live) (HD) – United Kingdom and Ireland
- Star Cricket (live) –India and Bangladesh
- ESPN (live) – India (3rd Test & few ODI's)
- SKY Sport (live) (HD) – New Zealand
- Supersport (live) – South Africa
- Eurosport (live) – Europe
- DirecTV (live) – USA
- Caribbean Media Corporation (live) – Barbados, Trinidad & Tobago and Antigua
- StarHub (pay per view) – Malaysia and Singapore
- ShowSports (live) – Middle East

=== Radio ===
- ABC Radio (live) – Australia
- Humara FM 94.6 (live) – Pakistan
