= Sikander Bakht (cricketer) =

Pakistani cricketer (born 1957)

Personal information
- Born: 25 August 1957 (age 69); Karachi, Pakistan
- Batting: Right-handed
- Bowling: Right-arm medium-fast
- Role: Bowler

International information
- National side: Pakistan (1976–1989)
- Test debut (cap 74): 30 October 1976 v New Zealand
- Last Test: 3 January 1983 v India
- ODI debut (cap 25): 30 December 1977 v England
- Last ODI: 6 February 1989 v New Zealand

Domestic team information
- Years: Team
- PIA cricket team
- United Bank Ltd
- Sindh Cricket Association

Career statistics
Competition	Test	ODI	FC	LA
Matches	26	27	186	100
Runs scored	146	31	1,944	187
Batting average	6.34	7.75	14.18	8.90
100s/50s	0/0	0/0	0/3	-0/0
Top score	22*	16*	67	28
Balls bowled	4,870	1,277	25,305	4,490
Wickets	67	33	553	119
Bowling average	36.00	26.06	25.61	22.74
5 wickets in innings	3	0	29	0
10 wickets in match	1	0	3	0
Best bowling	8/69	4/34	8/69	4/15
Catches/stumpings	7/–	4/–	82/–	23/–
- Source: ESPNcricinfo, 23 January 2015

Sikander Bakht (born 25 August 1957) is a Pakistani former international cricketer who played in 26 Test matches and 27 One Day Internationals (ODIs) for Pakistan from 1976 to 1989. He was included in the team in place of Ehteshamuddin and took 11 wickets in that Test and 24 wickets in the series.

During a match in Karachi, one of his deliveries broke the left arm of English captain Mike Brearley. His finest over came against India in Delhi in 1979/80 when he demolished them on a placid wicket by taking 8/69 with devastating penetration.

Bakht was part of the support staff for the Pakistan team in the 2003 Cricket World Cup as an assistant coach and team analyst. He has been working with Geo News as a sports analyst since 2011. His reviews are often controversial due to his outspoken nature. He has also worked with PTV, Indus TV, ESPN, Star Sports Express News, Indus and Samaa Television as a sports analyst.
