= Will Somerville (cricketer) =

New Zealand cricketer

Personal information
- Full name: William Edgar Richard Somerville
- Born: 9 August 1984 (age 42); Wadestown, Wellington, New Zealand
- Nickname: Dad
- Height: 6 ft 4 in (1.93 m)
- Batting: Right-handed
- Bowling: Right-arm off break
- Role: Bowler

International information
- National side: New Zealand
- Test debut (cap 275): 3 December 2018 v Pakistan
- Last Test: 3 December 2021 v India

Domestic team information
- Years: Team
- 2004/05–2007/08: Otago
- 2014/15–2017/18: New South Wales
- 2015/16–2017/18: Sydney Sixers
- 2018/19–2022/23: Auckland

Career statistics
Competition	Test	FC	LA	T20
Matches	6	53	32	43
Runs scored	115	1,077	332	200
Batting average	14.37	18.56	16.60	25.00
100s/50s	0/0	0/4	0/2	0/0
Top score	40*	60*	59	37*
Balls bowled	1,466	10,991	1,722	833
Wickets	15	161	39	40
Bowling average	48.26	29.98	35.10	27.80
5 wickets in innings	0	4	0	0
10 wickets in match	0	0	0	0
Best bowling	4/75	8/136	4/48	3/18
Catches/stumpings	0/–	23/–	10/–	7/–
- Source: CricInfo, 1 January 2024

William Edgar Richard Somerville (born 9 August 1984) is a New Zealand former professional cricketer who made his international debut for New Zealand in December 2018. He played domestically for Otago and Auckland and in Australia for New South Wales and Sydney Sixers. He retired from professional cricket in April 2023.

== Early and domestic career ==
Somerville was born in the Wellington suburb of Wadestown. His family moved from New Zealand to Sydney, Australia, when he was nine and he grew up there. He attended Cranbrook School in Sydney's eastern suburbs. He returned to New Zealand to study at the University of Otago. A right-handed batsman and off-spin bowler, he played three matches for Otago, against Wellington in March 2005 and against Canterbury and Northern Districts in March 2006. He also appeared in several matches for the New Zealand Academy in the 2005–06 season.

After his studies he returned to Sydney to work as a chartered accountant and play cricket for University. He began playing for New South Wales in 2013–14. On 2 January 2016, he made his Twenty20 debut for the Sydney Sixers in the 2015–16 Big Bash League.

Bowling for New South Wales in the Sheffield Shield in November 2016, Somerville took 4 for 61 and 5 for 65 in a three-wicket victory over Western Australia and was named player of the match. He was one of the leading bowlers in the Sheffield Shield that season, with 35 wickets at an average of 23.14, including figures of 8 for 136 in the first innings against Queensland. He made his List A debut for New South Wales in the 2017–18 JLT One-Day Cup on 15 October 2017.

In June 2018, he was awarded a contract with Auckland for the 2018–19 season. In September 2018, he was named in the Auckland Aces' squad for the 2018 Abu Dhabi T20 Trophy.

In June 2020, he was offered a contract by Auckland ahead of the 2020–21 domestic cricket season. He played his last professional cricket match in April 2023.

== International career ==
In November 2018, Somerville was added to New Zealand's Test squad for their series against Pakistan. He made his Test debut for New Zealand against Pakistan on 3 December 2018, and took 4/75 and 3/52 in New Zealand's 123-run victory.

Somerville played a total of six Test matches, taking 15 wickets. The four wickets he took on debut remained his best bowling analysis in Test matches.
