= Stewart Rhodes (cricketer) =

New Zealand cricketer (born 1986)

Stewart Rhodes (born 1 December 1986) is a left hand batting all rounder New Zealand cricketer who plays for the Wellington Firebirds in the Plunket Shield and the New Zealand one-day competition.
