= Ehteshamuddin (cricketer) =

Cricketer

Personal information
- Born: 4 September 1950 (age 76); Lahore, Pakistan
- Batting: Right-handed
- Bowling: Right-arm fast-medium

International information
- National side: Pakistan
- Test debut (cap 81): 21 November 1979 v India
- Last Test: 26 August 1982 v England

Career statistics
Competition	Test	First-class
Matches	5	134
Runs scored	2	1,078
Batting average	1.00	11.46
100s/50s	0/0	0/2
Top score	2	83
Balls bowled	940	10,470
Wickets	16	507
Bowling average	23.43	20.65
5 wickets in innings	1	37
10 wickets in match	0	8
Best bowling	5/47	9/124
Catches/stumpings	2/–	39/–
- Source: CricInfo, 30 August 2022

Ehteshamuddin (born 4 September 1950) is a Pakistani former cricketer who played in five Test matches from 1979 to 1982.

A right-arm medium paced bowler who relied on accuracy rather than pace, Ehteshamuddin toured India with the Pakistan side that played six Tests in 1979–80, and was picked for three of them, the first, fourth and sixth. India won the series 2–0, but Ehtesham did well, taking 14 wickets at an average of less than 20 runs per wicket. In the fourth Test at Kanpur, he took five first innings wickets for 47 runs, his best Test bowling performance, sharing all 10 wickets with Sikander Bakht (5 for 56). He later played one match in the home series against Australia in the same season.

Ehteshamuddin's last Test was as a last-minute replacement at Headingley on the 1982 England tour. He was playing club cricket for Daisy Hill in the Bolton Association league at the time and the Pakistan team was hard-hit by injuries. Ehteshamuddin looked unfit, and though he took the first England wicket to fall – Graeme Fowler – he bowled only 14 overs before suffering a hamstring injury and was not able to bowl again in the match. The game and the series was lost. He did not play Test cricket again. His batting was modest.

In recent years, Ehteshamuddin has been a Pakistan national cricket team selector.
