= Bilal Asif =

Pakistani cricketer

Personal information
- Full name: Mohammad Bilal Asif
- Born: 24 September 1985 (age 41); Sialkot, Punjab, Pakistan
- Height: 6 ft 3 in (191 cm)
- Batting: Right-handed
- Bowling: Right-arm off break
- Role: All-rounder
- Relatives: Zahid Saeed (uncle)

International information
- National side: Pakistan (2015-2018)
- Test debut (cap 233): 7 October 2018 v Australia
- Last Test: 3 December 2018 v New Zealand
- ODI debut (cap 206): 3 October 2015 v Zimbabwe
- Last ODI: 11 November 2015 v England

Domestic team information
- Years: Team
- 2011–present: Sialkot
- 2015: Sialkot Stallions
- 2016: Quetta Gladiators
- 2018–: Lahore Qalandars
- 2019/20–present: Central Punjab

Career statistics
Competition	Test	ODI
Matches	5	3
Runs scored	73	40
Batting average	9.12	13.33
100s/50s	0/0	0/0
Top score	15	38
Balls bowled	1174	132
Wickets	16	5
Bowling average	26.50	19.20
5 wickets in innings	2	1
10 wickets in match	0	0
Best bowling	6/36	5/25
Catches/stumpings	0/–	2/–
- Source: Cricinfo, 22 January 2021

Mohammad Bilal Asif (born 24 September 1985) is a Pakistani cricketer who represents the national team and also a singer-songwriter.

In August 2018, he was one of thirty-three players to be awarded a central contract for the 2018–19 season by the Pakistan Cricket Board (PCB).

== Personal life ==
The son of an electrician based in Kuwait, and the nephew of domestic left-arm seamer Zahid Saeed, Bilal Asif's family is from the Allo Mahar Sharif village, on the outskirts of Daska and close to Sialkot. In terms of education, he has a degree in arts and is fond of singing.

== Cricket career ==
=== Domestic career ===
Asif holds the record for scoring the most runs on debut in a Twenty20 match, with 114.

In April 2018, he was named in Sindh's squad for the 2018 Pakistan Cup. He was the joint-leading wicket-taker for Sindh during the tournament, with six dismissals in four matches. In March 2019, he was named in Federal Areas' squad for the 2019 Pakistan Cup.

In September 2019, he was named in Central Punjab's squad for the 2019–20 Quaid-e-Azam Trophy tournament. In January 2021, he was named in Central Punjab's squad for the 2020–21 Pakistan Cup.

=== International career ===
He was named in Pakistan's One Day International (ODI) squad for their tour of Sri Lanka in July 2015, although he did not play. He made his ODI debut for Pakistan against Zimbabwe on 3 October 2015.

In his second ODI against Zimbabwe on 5 October 2015, Bilal took his first international five-wicket haul. Zimbabwe were all out for 161 runs and Bilal had figures of 5 for 25. He also hit 38 off 39 deliveries later on, while opening the batting. However, after the match he was reported for a suspect bowling action. He was recalled to Pakistan's Test squad on 19 October for the tour against England, after undergoing an evaluation on his bowling action. His action was cleared by the ICC on 30 October 2015.

In September 2017, he was named in Pakistan's Test squad for their series against Sri Lanka, but he did not play. In September 2018, he was named in Pakistan's Test squad for their series against Australia. He made his Test debut for Pakistan against Australia on 7 October 2018. He became the 11th bowler for Pakistan to take a five-wicket haul on debut in Tests.

In June 2020, he was named as one of four reserve players for Pakistan's tour to England during the COVID-19 pandemic.

== Music career ==
In 2020 he launched his career as a singer-songwriter with the release of the Punjabi track Akhiyan.

In 2021 he wrote and sung Yeh Hai PSL, an unofficial anthem for the Pakistan Super League.
