= Junaid Khan (cricketer) =

Pakistani cricketer & coach (born 1989)

Personal information
- Full name: Mohammad Junaid Khan
- Born: 24 December 1989 (age 36); Swabi, Khyber Pakhtunkhwa, Pakistan
- Nickname: Jonii
- Height: 6 ft 1 in (185 cm)
- Batting: Right-handed
- Bowling: Left arm fast
- Role: Bowler
- Relatives: Yasir Shah (cousin); Fawad Ahmed (cousin)

International information
- National side: Pakistan (2011–2019)
- Test debut (cap 208): 1 September 2011 v Zimbabwe
- Last Test: 20 January 2014 v Sri Lanka
- ODI debut (cap 181): 23 April 2011 v West Indies
- Last ODI: 17 May 2019 v England
- ODI shirt no.: 83
- T20I debut (cap 40): 21 April 2011 v West Indies
- Last T20I: 21 March 2014 v India
- T20I shirt no.: 83

Domestic team information
- Years: Team
- 2008/09: Abbottabad Falcons
- 2011, 2014, 2017: Lancashire
- 2015: Middlesex
- 2016–2017: Peshawar Zalmi (squad no. 83)
- 2016–2017: Khulna Titans (squad no. 83)
- 2018: Barbados Tridents (squad no. 12)
- 2018–present: Multan Sultans (squad no. 83)
- 2019/20–present: Khyber Pakhtunkhwa
- 2019/20: Rangpur Riders

Career statistics
Competition	Test	ODI	T20I	FC
Matches	22	76	9	89
Runs scored	122	68	3	791
Batting average	7.17	4.85	–	9.76
100s/50s	0/0	0/0	0/0	0/2
Top score	17	25	3*	71
Balls bowled	4,605	3,601	162	16,967
Wickets	71	110	8	350
Bowling average	31.73	29.23	29.50	24.51
5 wickets in innings	5	0	0	21
10 wickets in match	0	0	0	3
Best bowling	5/38	4/12	3/24	7/46
Catches/stumpings	4/–	7/–	0/–	17/–
Medal record
Men's Cricket
Representing Pakistan
South Asian Games
Bronze medal – third place	2010 Dhaka	Team
Champions Trophy
Winner	2017 England & Wales
- Source: ESPN Crickinfo, 21 August 2021

Mohammad Junaid Khan (Pashto: جنید خان; born 24 December 1989) is a Pakistani cricket coach and former cricketer who played for the Pakistan national cricket team from 2011 to 2019. His cousin, the leg-spinner Yasir Shah, followed his path later. Junaid Khan was a member of the Pakistan team that won the 2017 ICC Champions Trophy.

After an injury to Sohail Tanvir on the eve of the 2011 World Cup, Khan was called up as his replacement, with no experience in international cricket. Khan did not play in the tournament, and later made his One Day International debut in April 2011. In June that year Khan represented Lancashire County Cricket Club in English domestic cricket.

In August 2018, he was one of 33 players to be awarded a central contract for the 2018–19 season by the Pakistan Cricket Board (PCB).

== Cricket career ==
=== Sighting ===
No cricketer had come from Swabi before and Khan did not take an interest in cricket initially. He played with tape-ball and was introduced to hard ball set up by his cousin. At age 16 he was measured as the fastest bowler in the NWFP Twenty/20 competition. Khan said, "Some of my team mates suggested that I should go for the Under 17 trials Abbottabad. I was in two minds but afterwards I was relieved that I attended the trials, as Ehteshamuddin spotted me and told me that I had potential and that I should go to Lahore".

=== Early domestic career ===
Khan made his first-class debut on 24 January 2007 at the age of 17. Playing for Abbottabad against Multan, his first wicket was that of Majid Majeed. The match ended in a draw and Khan finished with four wickets for 57 runs (4/57). For four years he took wickets consistently for his domestic team Abbottabad and he was the team's chief strike bowler. He also played for Abbottabad Falcons in the Faysal Bank Twenty20.

In the 2008/09 season, Khan represented the Khan Research Laboratories cricket team and played for them in the final of the 2008/09 Quaid-i-Azam Trophy; he took a single wicket in the match as his team lost to Sialkot. Khan also played for Pakistan A. In the unofficial Test series between Pakistan A and Sri Lanka A in 2010, Khan was his team's leading wicket-taker with ten from two matches.

=== Selection into the Pakistan team ===
Following the recurrence of a knee injury to Sohail Tanvir, the uncapped Khan was added in Pakistan's squad for the 2011 World Cup.

He did not play a single match in the tournament and was forced to wait for his ODI debut. When Pakistan toured the West Indies for two Tests, five ODIs, and a T20I in April and May Khan was included in the squad. On 21 April, Khan made his T20I debut and went wicketless in the match.

Two days later, Khan, Mohammad Salman, and Hammad Azam made their ODI debuts against West Indies. Opening the bowling with Wahab Riaz, Khan conceded 49 runs from 10 overs without taking a wicket. Pakistan won the series 3–2 and Khan finished with three wickets from five matches, making him the team's fourth highest wicket-taker. His first ODI wicket was that of Marlon Samuels.

In May, Pakistan toured Ireland for a two-match ODI series. Khan was Man of the Match in the first fixture, taking four wickets for twelve runs to help Pakistan to a seven-wicket victory. Pakistan won the series 2–0 and Khan finished as the second-highest wicket-taker for the series with six at an average of 10.83. On the advice of former Pakistan and Lancashire all-rounder Wasim Akram, Lancashire signed Khan on "modest terms" according to coach Mike Watkinson to play for them in the Friends Life t20 in June with the possibility of playing in the County Championship. Problems with his visa meant Khan's Lancashire debut was delayed and it was not until 27 June that he represented Lancashire for the first time in a twenty20 match. Later that month Khan made his County Championship debut against Durham, stepping in for the injured Farveez Maharoof, Lancashire's other overseas player. While playing for Lancashire he took career best t20 bowling figures of 3/12 against the Derbyshire Falcons. During his spell with the club, Khan received advice from Akram on how to bowl in English conditions.

In August, Khan was awarded a category C central contract with the Pakistan Cricket Board; six players were in category A, eight in B, and nine (including Khan) in C. When Pakistan toured Zimbabwe in September for a Test three ODIs and two T20Is, the national selectors took the opportunity to give inexperienced players an opportunity. Frontline bowlers Wahab Riaz and Umar Gul were rested and Khan was chosen as part of the squad.

Although Khan had helped Lancashire reach t20 finals days, international selection meant that Khan would be unavailable to take part and would miss the end of the season with the club. On 1 September 2011, Khan made his Test debut against Zimbabwe; Pakistan's fast bowlers in the match were inexperienced, with just one Test cap between them. The coach, Waqar Younis, commented that though Khan had a successful spell with Lancashire he still had a lot to learn as a Test bowler. Khan's sole wicket in the match, which Pakistan won, was that of batsman Craig Ervine caught and bowled.

The following month, Pakistan played Sri Lanka in three Test, five ODIs, and a T20I. On the opening day of the Test series, on a pitch suited to batting, Khan took his maiden five-wicket haul in Tests. Pakistan won the Test series 1–0, and Khan contributed 12 wickets to the victory. During the fifth ODI he suffered the first injury of his career: a partial tear of the muscles in his abdomen. As a result, he was unable to play for six weeks and missed Pakistan's tour of Bangladesh in November and December. His match winning performance also came during a T20 match against England.

Khan was selected for the ODI squad for Australia's tour of Pakistan in UAE, August–September 2012, playing his first series against Australia. However he was excluded from the T20 side, hence being excluded from the T20 World Cup being held in Sri Lanka in September. This decision was criticised to be unjustified due to the selection of fast bowler Mohammad Sami and his recent performance against Sri Lanka.

In December 2012, Khan was again picked for the series against India and was given a chance in the ODI series and he performed superbly by picking up 4 wickets in the first match (clean bowled Sehwag, Kohli, Yuvraj) and helped in Pakistan win in first ODI and again performed superbly in the second ODI and picked up three wickets including two top order vital wickets of Gambhir and Kohli. In November 2013, despite his injured shin, he successfully defended 9 runs off the final over in Port Elizabeth clinching Pakistan a 1 run win and Pakistan's first bilateral ODI series win against the Proteas.

He was also named in the T20I XI by ESPNcricinfo for his performances in 2013.

He was also named as part of the 'Team of the Tournament' at the 2017 Champions Trophy by the ICC and Cricbuzz.

Khan also has an impressive record against Sri Lanka, having played 13 games, 7 Tests and 6 ODIs. He has taken all four of his Test five-wicket hauls against Sri Lanka, 2 in the UAE and 2 in SL. His best innings bowling figures of 5/38 was taken against them, as well as best match figures, 8/151. Also, 48 of his international wickets have come against this particular side. He picked up his 50th Test wicket in his 14 Tests by claiming Dinesh Chandimal's wicket in the first Test against them in the UAE, in the 2013/14 season. He was also the highest wicket-taker in the ODI leg of the same tour, having 13 scalps from 5 games.

In April 2019, he was named in Pakistan's squad for the 2019 Cricket World Cup. However, on 20 May 2019, he was dropped from Pakistan's squad, after they announced their final team for the tournament.

=== Later domestic career ===
In April 2018, he was named in Sindh's squad for the 2018 Pakistan Cup. He was the joint-leading wicket-taker for Sindh during the tournament, with six dismissals in three matches. In 2019, he was recalled to the Pakistan team.

In September 2019, he was named in Khyber Pakhtunkhwa's squad for the 2019–20 Quaid-e-Azam Trophy tournament.

=== County cricket ===
Khan played 8 T20 games for Lancashire in 2011, taking 12 wickets, including a 3–12 spell against Derbyshire.

In early 2013, Khan received offers from three county clubs: Lancashire, Surrey and Sussex. He said he would think about them after the Test series in South Africa, and getting clearance from the PCB. Later on, he turned down all offers to focus on the Champion's Trophy 2013.

On 23 April 2014, Lancashire confirmed that Khan would be returning to play in both the NatWest T20 blast and the Royal London One Day Cup.

On 24 July 2015, it was announced by tribune.com.pk that Middlesex had signed Khan for the 2015 Royal London One-Day Cup.

== Playing style ==
Although, I have done well in T20s around the world, I want to focus on test cricket. I believe that T20 cricket spoils a player's technique and disables him from playing test matches. I got offers from the BPL and the SLPL, but I rejected them just for the sake of test cricket[sic].

— Talking with GEO tv in 2013

Khan modelled his bowling action on that of fellow left-arm fast-bowler Wasim Akram. He was also influenced by watched clips of Imran Khan bowling. In his own words, Khan is "a line and length bowler" and he believes that "if you try to be accurate and you bowl a tight line the wickets will follow." According to Khan, he usually bowls around 140 to 142 km/h (87 to 88 mph). He has the ability to swing the ball into and away from batsmen. Khan stated that during his time with Lancashire County Cricket Club he learned how to bowl a yorker and how to use swing and seam. Khan also bowls with an exaggerated skip and jump at the start of his run up.

== Post-retirement ==
=== Cricket administration ===
In January 2023, he became part of a selection committee for domestic age-group teams, headed by former international player Kamran Akmal, conducting trials for the selection of the U-13, U-16 and U-19 regional and district sides.

=== Coaching career ===
In August 2023 Junaid Khan officially began his coaching career. He became the head coach for Islamabad region and helped them get promoted to 1st class cricket from division two. In December 2023, he was named as Pakistan U19 bowling coach for the 2024 Under-19 Cricket World Cup, filling in for Rehan Riaz. In June 2024, he became bowling coach for the Pakistan women's team, initially for the 2024 Women's Twenty20 Asia Cup, then confirmed as an ongoing role.
