= Kamran Akmal =

Pakistani cricketer (born 13 January 1982)

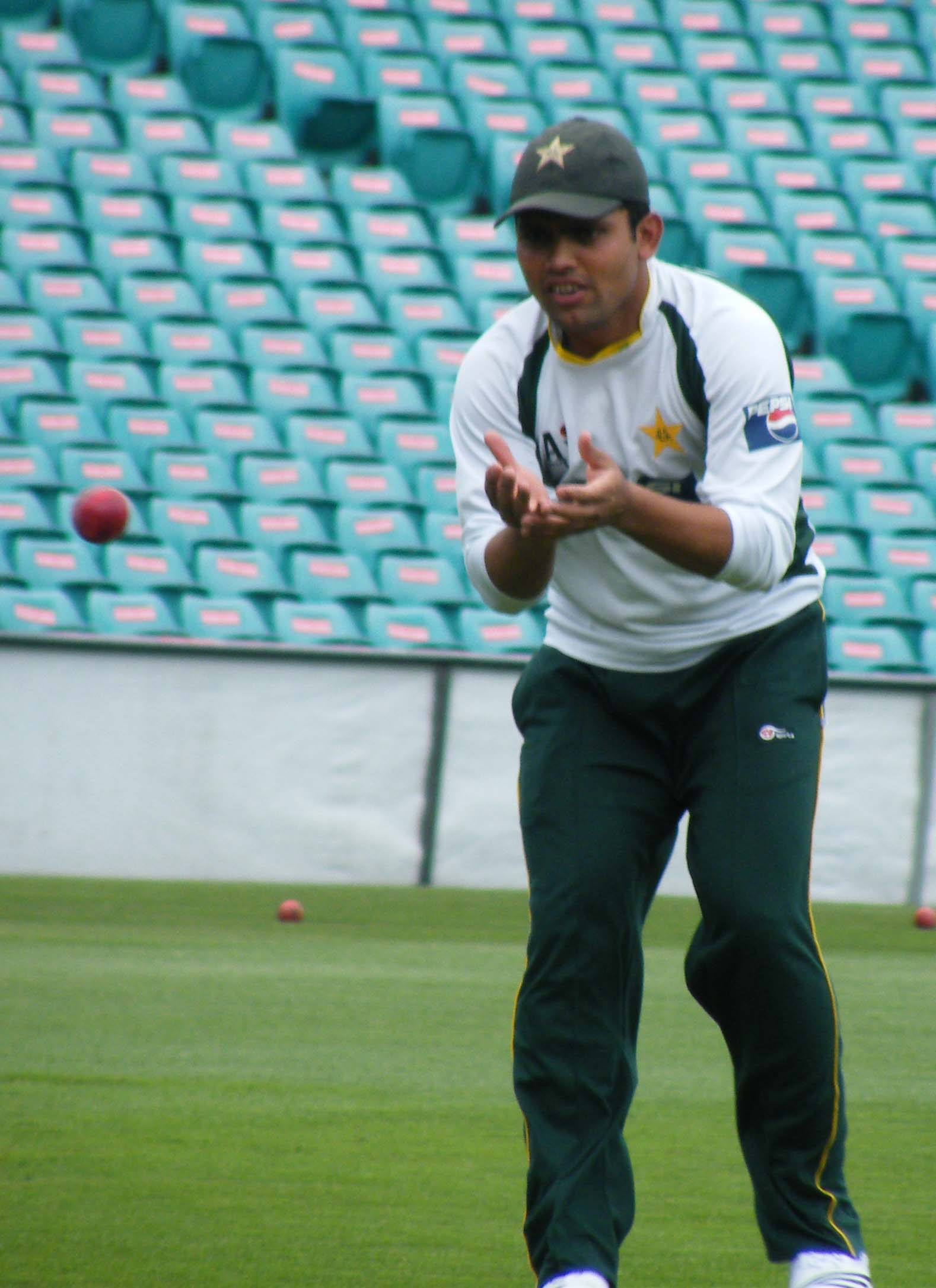

Personal information
- Born: 13 January 1982 (age 44); Lahore, Punjab, Pakistan
- Nickname: Kami
- Height: 1.68 m (5 ft 6 in)
- Batting: Right-handed
- Bowling: Right-arm medium
- Role: Wicketkeeper-batsman
- Relatives: Adnan Akmal (brother); Umar Akmal (brother); Babar Azam (cousin); Mohammad Ilyas (father-in-law)

International information
- National side: Pakistan (2002–2017)
- Test debut (cap 172): 9 November 2002 v Zimbabwe
- Last Test: 26 August 2010 v England
- ODI debut (cap 143): 23 November 2002 v Zimbabwe
- Last ODI: 11 April 2017 v West Indies
- ODI shirt no.: 23
- T20I debut (cap 3): 28 August 2006 v England
- Last T20I: 2 April 2017 v West Indies

Domestic team information
- Years: Team
- 2005–2012: Lahore Lions
- 2008: Rajasthan Royals
- 2012–2014: Lahore Eagles
- 2015: Multan Tigers
- 2015: Trinbago Knight Riders
- 2015: Chittagong Vikings
- 2016–2022: Peshawar Zalmi (squad no. 23)
- 2019–2020: Central Punjab

Career statistics
Competition	Test	ODI	T20I	FC
Matches	53	157	58	249
Runs scored	2,648	3,236	987	13,481
Batting average	30.79	26.09	21.00	38.29
100s/50s	6/12	5/10	0/5	33/62
Top score	158*	124	73	275
Catches/stumpings	184/22	157/31	28/32	871/66
- Source: ESPNricinfo, 5 September 2022

Kamran Akmal (Punjabi, Urdu: کامران اکمل; born 13 January 1982) is a Pakistani cricket administrator, coach and former cricketer, who played for Pakistan as a right-handed batsman & wicketkeeper. He started his international career in November 2002 with a Test match at Harare Sports Club. Akmal was a member of the Pakistan team that won the 2009 ICC World Twenty20. He was an integral member of the Peshawar Zalmi for the entire duration of his career in the Pakistan Super League having played for them from the inaugural season of the PSL 2016, till his last in PSL 2022. He scored three hundreds and was a key figure in their success in winning PSL 2017 and being runners up in PSL 2018, 2019 and 2021, being the top run scorer of the team for a large portion of those seasons.

In February 2023, he announced his retirement from all forms of cricket due to his new commitments in cricket administration and coaching.

== Early and personal life ==
He was born to Mohammad Akmal Siddique, a senior cricket administrator, in a large family consisting of a sister and seven brothers, Kamran being the fourth of them, while two of his younger brothers, Adnan Akmal and Umar Akmal, are also professional cricketers, the former being a wicket-keeper batsman and the latter being a specialist batsman, as well as a part-time wicket-keeper. Pakistani batsman and former captain Babar Azam is also his first cousin.

He is an alumnus of the Beaconhouse School System.

He married the daughter of former Test cricketer Mohammad Ilyas in 2006 and lives with his wife and children.

== International career ==
Kamran Akmal was a quick-scoring batsman and a wicket-keeper, who has achieved 6 centuries in Test cricket. However, his first century was vital – his 109 from the number eight position at Mohali, coming in with Pakistan in a lead of 39 against India in the first Test, ensured that the visitors could draw the match. His form against the touring England in 2005 made him one of the most important players in the team. Naturally, he is a batsman that plays lower down the order but has also opened in limited over formats. As an opener he has scored two back to back centuries in ODIs against England. Coming in lower down the order in Test matches, he played one memorable innings. He saved Pakistan from a score of 39/6, scoring a century, to a competitive 245 which helped Pakistan win the match and the series.

His batting was highly productive in early 2006 as he scored seven international hundreds within the space of 6 months. Since his tour of England in Summer 2006 however his batting form dwindled and steadily become worse. His wicket-keeping also worsened and dropped many catches on both the England tour and on a tour to South Africa in early 2007. He then scored an international hundred in the Bangladeshi tour of Pakistan in 2008. He later moved to have some injuries and did not play for some days but later he was again brought into the team.

Akmal was dropped for the 2008 Asia Cup as a result of his poor wicket-keeping. He was replaced by Sarfraz Ahmed who performed very well at the domestic level and also because of Sarfraz's strong showing in the U-19 World Cup. Akmal was named in the 30-man probable squad for the 2008 ICC Champions Trophy.

Akmal was part of the Pakistan team that won the T20 World Cup in 2009. He was notable for his quick stumpings, dismissing 4 batsmen in one match against Netherlands.

On 12 November 2008, Akmal hit three consecutive 6s in the last over. As a result, Pakistan won the first ODI in Abu Dhabi against West Indies.

On 17 July 2010, Akmal was appointed the vice-captain of the Pakistani Test squad but later removed because of his alleged involvement in spot fixing.

In August 2012, Akmal was recalled for the three ODI series against Australia.

In March 2013, he played the five ODI matches of the tour to South Africa.

In May 2013, he played an ODI for the tour to Scotland, the second ODI being abandoned because of rain, while few days later he also played both ODIs against Ireland.

In June 2013, he was part of the national squad for the 2013 ICC Champions Trophy.

In April 2017, he played the three ODIs of the tour to the West Indies, these matches being the last time he would play for the national team.

In February 2023, Akmal announced his retirement from all forms of cricket.

=== Wicket-keeping ===
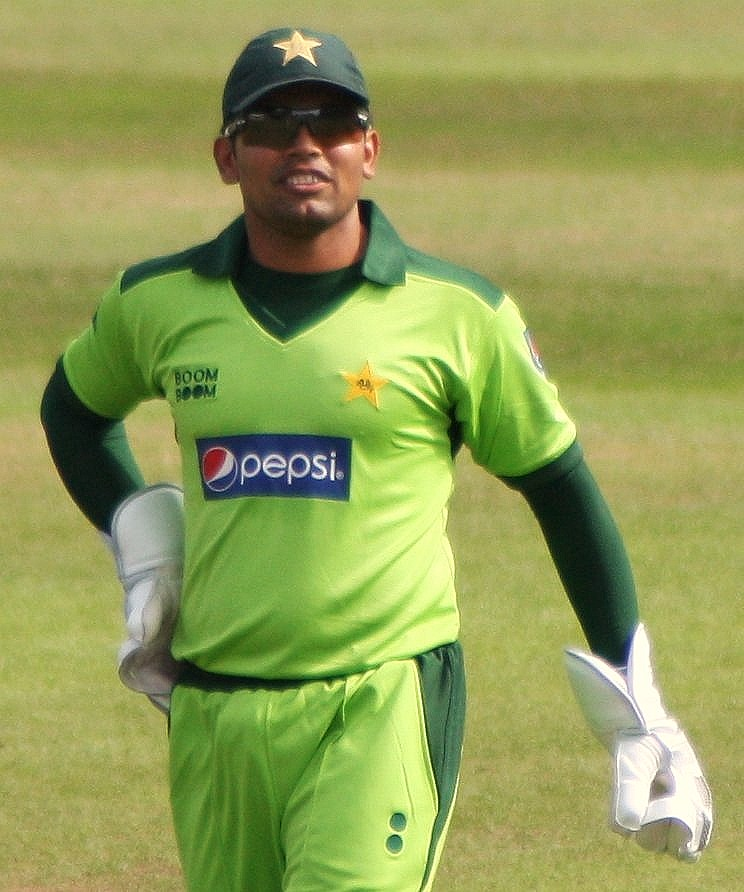
Kamran Akmal keeping wicket for Pakistan during a 50-over warm-up match against Somerset at the County Ground, Taunton, during Pakistan's 2010 tour of England

After a poor series behind the stumps against Sri Lanka in January 2009, journalists and former players called for his removal from the national team. His wicket-keeping steadily improved, with a very strong showing in the 2009 T20 World Cup, including a world-record performance of four stumpings in a single match against the Netherlands. However, during the second test against Australia at the Sydney Cricket Ground, he dropped four catches including three chances from Michael Hussey in one session on Day 4. Hussey went on to score a match-winning century resulting in Pakistan's defeat despite dominating the first three days of the match. He was subsequently dropped for the third test, being replaced by Sarfraz Ahmed. After this tour, Akmal saw a steady improvement in his wicket-keeping for the 2010 ICC World Twenty20, 2010 Asia Cup and against Australia in July 2010. However, in the next test series against England, Akmal dropped three easy catches and missed a stumping chance. During the match, he took a superb catch of Kevin Pietersen before dropping a catch of Paul Collingwood on the very next ball. In the first innings, Akmal dropped a catch of Eoin Morgan when he was on 23 and then went on to score 130. Despite having another keeper, Zulqarnain Haider, in the squad, Pakistani captain Salman Butt announced it was too early to decide the fate of Kamran Akmal, as just one match has been played.

=== Match fixing allegations ===
In the 2nd Test match in Sydney on the 2009–10 tour of Australia, Akmal dropped four catches in the Australian innings, three of those coming from Michael Hussey. Hussey went on to score 134* and was involved in a massive 9th wicket partnership stand of 133 runs with Peter Siddle. Pakistan eventually lost the match by 36 runs, after being bowled out for just 139 in the second innings. Later, it was alleged that he, along with pace bowler Rana Naved-ul-Hasan were involved in match fixing, and were questioned by Pakistan Cricket Board and subsequently dropped for the Twenty20 series against England.

In early September 2010, the International Cricket Council (ICC) sent an official notice to him telling him that he is under investigation for allegedly fixing the Sydney Test. For the subsequent series against South Africa in October 2010, Akmal had an operation to remove his appendix and was unavailable for the limited-overs squad. Akmal was able to recover from the operation to participate in the two-match test series but Zulqarnain Haider was selected instead of him. Another reason also emerged that Kamran Akmal, Shoaib Malik, Umar Amin and Yasir Hameed were not selected for the tour because of suspicions being raised regarding their involvement in the spot-fixing scandal that included Salman Butt, Mohammad Amir and Mohammad Asif. Wahab Riaz was also under investigation for match-fixing but the ICC interrogated him and excluded him from the investigation, therefore, he was allowed to take part on the tour against South Africa that included two Twenty20 Internationals, five ODI matches and two Test matches. Though this has not been confirmed by the board, it is believed that the reason they were not picked was that the suspicion had not been cleared. The ICC confirmed that Akmal had been barred from entering the team. Once his investigation was completed he was available for national selection.

== Domestic and franchise career ==
In the 2016–17 Quaid-e-Azam Trophy, Akmal was the highest run-scorer in the tournament making 1,035 runs. In November 2017, he scored 150 not out batting for Lahore Whites against Islamabad in the 2017–18 National T20 Cup. He hit the most number of sixes in a domestic T20 match in Pakistan and became the third batsman to make five consecutive fifties in T20 cricket. During the 2017–18 National T20 Cup he along with Salman Butt set the world record opening partnership in T20 history of unbeaten 209 runstand, surpassing the previous highest opening partnership of 207 in any form of T20 cricket held by Joe Denly and Daniel Bell-Drummond. The record runstand was also the third highest partnership in terms of runs for any wicket in T20 history.

In April 2018, he was named as the captain of Federal Areas' squad for the 2018 Pakistan Cup. In the opening fixture of the tournament, against Khyber Pakhtunkhwa, he scored 105 runs and was named the man of the match. He was the leading run-scorer for Federal Areas in the tournament, with 313 runs in four matches. In March 2019, he was named as the captain of Punjab's squad for the 2019 Pakistan Cup.

In September 2019, he was named in Central Punjab's squad for the 2019–20 Quaid-e-Azam Trophy tournament.

On 13 October 2020, in the 2020–21 National T20 Cup, Akmal became the first wicket-keeper to affect 100 stumpings in Twenty20 cricket.

=== T20 franchise career ===
==== IPL career ====
Akmal was signed on to the Rajasthan Royals, and played in the inaugural season of the IPL. He played five matches in the tournament, as a Wicket-keeper and top-order batsman, including the final of the tournament against the Chennai Super Kings. He took two catches in the first innings, however, he was run out for only six runs during the Royal's chase. The Royals won the tournament after a thrilling finish. He did not participated in the IPL 2009 because Pakistani players were not allowed to play in that season as a result of the tense atmosphere after the 2008 Mumbai attacks.

==== PSL career ====
Kamran was picked ("bought") for US$70,000 by the Peshawar Zalmi team. He had an average scoring of just 151 runs in the 2016 season scoring, with a highest score of 45. He was retained on the back of his tremendous performance in 2016–17 Quaid-e-Azam Trophy. In the inaugural match of 2017 season against Islamabad United, he scored 88 runs off just 48 balls. He lost his rhythm in the middle of the season but found his form at right time against Karachi Kings in a do-or-die match scoring a century off just 60 balls, ensuring his team a place in the final. He was later adjudged player-of-the-match. He finished the tournament as the leading run-scorer with 353 runs and won the green cap and the Hanif Mohammad Award for best batsman, as well as the Imtiaz Ahmed award for the best wicket keeper of the season with a total of 12 dismissals. His other PSL centuries are against Lahore Qalandars during the 2018 PSL and against Quetta Gladiators during the 2020 PSL. He has the most PSL centuries, with three of them.

==== Other leagues ====
In 2015, Kamran Akmal played for Trinbago Knight Riders in Caribbean Premier League (CPL). In 2017, he was signed by Saint Lucia Kings in Caribbean Premier League (CPL). On 3 June 2018, he was selected to play for the Toronto Nat. In September 2018, he was named in Balkh's squad in the first edition of the Afghanistan Premier League tournament. In November 2020, he was signed by Dambulla Hawks in the Lanka Premier League but he pulled out after few days due to shoulder injury.

He is captain of Kotli Lions in the inaugural edition of Kashmir Premier League.

=== T10 franchise career ===
Kamran was picked by the Maratha Arabians team in the inaugural edition of T10 League held in UAE. He was retained by the franchise for the 2nd edition as well. Kamran Akmal played in the first edition of Qatar T10 League in 2019 where he was picked by Swift Gallopers.

== Post-retirement ==
=== Cricket administration ===
In January 2023, he became the head of a selection committee for domestic age-group teams, conducting trials for the selection of the U-13, U-16 and U-19 regional and district teams.

In February 2023, he was also made a member of Haroon Rasheed's national selection committee.

Later in February 2023 he withdrew from the senior and junior selection panels as he had a contract with some private TV channel for the coverage of 2023 PSL, and found that appearing there as a PCB official would lead to a conflict of interest.

=== Coaching career ===
In February 2023, he was appointed the batting mentor for Peshawar Zalmi. Akmal also served as the head coach of Peshawar for an exhibition match against the Quetta Gladiators when regular head coach, Daren Sammy, was not available.

=== Television ===
Year	Show	Channel	Note
2022-2023	The Ultimate Muqabla	ARY Digital	Adventure-action reality show
