= Yasir Shah =

Pakistani cricketer

Yasir Shah SI
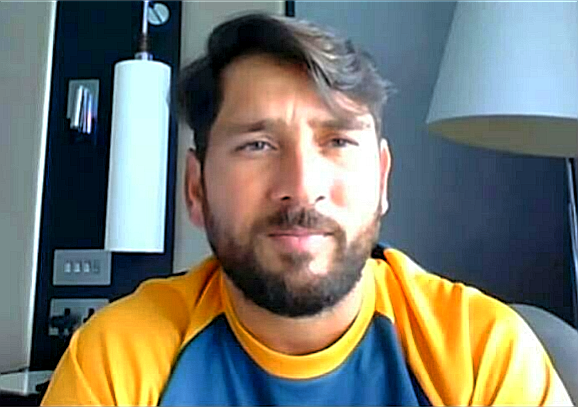
- Shah in 2020

Personal information
- Full name: Yasir Shah
- Born: 2 May 1986 (age 40); Swabi, Khyber Pakhtunkhwa, Pakistan
- Height: 5 ft 6 in (1.68 m)
- Batting: Right-handed
- Bowling: Right-arm leg break
- Role: Bowler
- Relatives: Junaid Khan (cousin); Fawad Ahmed (cousin)

International information
- National side: Pakistan (2011–2022)
- Test debut (cap 219): 22 October 2014 v Australia
- Last Test: 24 July 2022 v Sri Lanka
- ODI debut (cap 188): 14 September 2011 v Zimbabwe
- Last ODI: 11 May 2019 v England
- ODI shirt no.: 86
- T20I debut (cap 44): 16 September 2011 v Zimbabwe
- Last T20I: 18 September 2011 v Zimbabwe

Domestic team information
- Years: Team
- Rest of North-West Frontier Province
- 2001–2009: Pakistan Customs
- 2008–2015: Abbottabad Rhinos
- 2010: Sui Northern Gas Pipelines Limited
- 2011–present: Khyber-Pakhtunkhwa Province
- 2015: Dhaka Dynamites
- 2016–2019: Lahore Qalandars (squad no. 86)
- 2017: Kent (squad no. 86)
- 2017: Trinbago Knight Riders
- 2017: Brisbane Heat
- 2019: Khulna Titans
- 2020: Peshawar Zalmi (squad no. 86)

Career statistics
Competition	Test	ODI	FC	LA
Matches	48	25	148	97
Runs scored	865	127	3,097	723
Batting average	13.73	18.14	17.01	20.65
100s/50s	1/0	0/0	1/7	0/2
Top score	113	32*	113	66*
Balls bowled	13,997	1,293	33,687	5,012
Wickets	244	24	612	122
Bowling average	31.38	47.91	28.81	32.77
5 wickets in innings	16	1	33	2
10 wickets in match	3	0	4	0
Best bowling	8/41	6/26	8/41	6/26
Catches/stumpings	24/–	6/–	74/–	34/–
- Source: ESPNcricinfo, 24 July 2022

Yasir Shah SI (Pashto: یاسر شاه; born 2 May 1986) is an international cricketer from Pakistan. He plays as a bowler, and is the joint-second fastest bowler in the history of Test cricket to take 100 wickets, as well as the fastest to pick up 200 wickets, having broken the previous record held by Australian bowler Clarrie Grimmett.

Shah made his Test match debut for Pakistan against Australia in the UAE on 22 October 2014. During Pakistan's tour of Sri Lanka, Shah became the fastest Pakistani bowler to take 50 Test wickets.

From December 2015 to March 2016, Shah was banned for 3 months from playing any type of cricket by the ICC after a sample taken from him was found to contain chlortalidone, a banned substance which is on WADA's prohibited list of diuretics and masking agents. In December 2018, during Pakistan's Test series against New Zealand, Shah became the fastest bowler to take 200 wickets in Tests, breaking an 82-year-old record.

== Family ==
Shah was born into a Bondizai Pashtun family in Swabi, Khyber Pakhtunkhwa in 1986. His cousins include fellow cricketers Junaid Khan, who has played as a fast bowler for Pakistan, as well Fawad Ahmed, who has played as a spin bowler for Australia.

== Domestic and T20 franchise career ==
Yasir Shah made his first-class debut in February 2002. Shah has played for numerous teams in the Pakistani first-class domestic cricket circuit, including the Khyber Pakhtunkhwa cricket team, Abbottabad Rhinos, Pakistan Customs cricket team and Sui Northern Gas Pipelines Limited. He has also played cricket for the Pakistan A cricket team. He was selected to play for Brisbane Heat, along with fellow Pakistani Shadab Khan, for the 2017–18 Big Bash League season.

In October 2018, he was named in the squad for the Khulna Titans team, following the draft for the 2018–19 Bangladesh Premier League.

== International career ==
Shah played his first international match, the third game of the one-day international series on Pakistan's tour of Zimbabwe, on 14 September 2011. In the game, he took 2 for 51 runs (10 overs). The wickets were of Zimbabwean opener Vusi Sibanda and star wicketkeeper-batsman Tatenda Taibu.

In August 2018, he was one of 33 players to be awarded a central contract for the 2018–19 season by the Pakistan Cricket Board (PCB).

Shah made his Test debut against Australia, who toured to the UAE in 2014. He was picked in place of Saeed Ajmal, who was banned for an illegal bowling action. In the first Test, he picked up 7 for 116 with Steve Smith becoming his first wicket. He helped the team to win the match by 221 runs. In the second Test, he took 5 for 91 which resulted in a 356-run win for Pakistan and a whitewash of Australia. His 12 wickets made him the second-highest wicket-taker of that series. In January 2015, Shah was selected in Pakistan's squad for the 2015 Cricket World Cup and was considered as a long-term replacement for Pakistan's banned off-spinner Saeed Ajmal. He made his World Cup debut against arch-rivals India on 15 February 2015.

Starting from 27 December 2015 to 27 March 2016, Shah was banned for 3 months from playing any type of cricket by the ICC after a sample taken from him on 13 November was found to contain chlortalidone, a banned substance which is on WADA's prohibited list of diuretics and masking agents.

In June 2015, while on tour against Sri Lanka, Shah became the fastest Pakistani bowler to take 50 Test wickets, which he did in just nine matches. The record for Pakistan in Test cricket was previously held by Waqar Younis, Mohammad Asif and Shabbir Ahmed, all of whom took 50 wickets in ten matches. However, the fastest bowler to take 50 wickets in Test cricket is Charles Turner of Australia, who accomplished the feat in only six matches. Shah then picked up 3 consecutive five-wicket hauls in three Tests against Sri Lanka, further improving his Test record. For his performances in 2015, he was named in the World Test XI by ICC. He was also named in the Test XI of the year 2015 by Cricinfo

In July 2016, while on tour against England, Shah became the first leg spinner to take a five-wicket haul in a Test innings at Lord's since Mushtaq Ahmed in 1996. and 10 wickets in the whole match. He also became the highest wicket-taking bowler in a single match from any Asian team at Lord's.

On 18 July 2016, Shah reached No. 1 in the ICC rankings for Test bowlers, becoming the first Pakistani bowler to do since Ahmed in December 1996. He displaced English quick Jimmy Anderson from the No. 1 spot and is the first leg spinner since Warne in 2005 to be ranked No. 1. However, following his poor performance in the second Test eight days later, he dropped four places to number five.

In his 17th Test match against West Indies in Dubai, Shah took his 100th Test wicket and became the second fastest ever to achieve this milestone, with only George Lohmann bettering it. He is fastest Pakistani to take 50 and 100 wickets in Tests. On 28 September 2017, during the first Test against Sri Lanka, he became the joint-second fastest bowler of all time and quickest spinner to take 150 wickets in Tests.

In November 2018, in the second Test against New Zealand, Shah took fourteen wickets in the match. In the first innings, he took eight wickets for 41 runs, the best for any bowler against New Zealand in a Test match. On the same day, he took a total of ten wickets to become the first bowler for Pakistan and, only the second bowler overall, to take ten wickets in a single day of Test match cricket. His match figures of 14/184 are currently the best by a Pakistani spin bowler in Tests, the second-best figures by any bowler for Pakistan in Tests and the most wickets by a single bowler against New Zealand in a Test match. In December 2018, during the same series against New Zealand, Shah took his 200th wicket in Test cricket. He became the fastest bowler, in terms of matches played, to take 200 wickets in Tests, doing so in his 33rd match.

In November 2019, during the series against Australia, Yasir Shah set a record for becoming the first ever bowler to concede 200 runs in an innings of a Test match on three occasions. During the same series, he also scored his first century in Test cricket. In the series against Bangladesh he took 4–58 in the 2nd innings of the first test.

In June 2020, he was named in a 29-man squad for Pakistan's tour to England during the COVID-19 pandemic. In July, he was shortlisted in Pakistan's 20-man squad for the Test matches against England.

In November 2020, Shah was nominated for the ICC Men's Test Cricketer of the Decade award.

In January 2021, he was named in Pakistan's Test squad for their series against South Africa.

=== Five-wicket hauls ===
As of April 2022, Shah has taken 16 five-wicket hauls in Test matches and one in a One Day International. His best Test match bowling figures are the 8/41 taken against New Zealand in 2018. Yasir's best ODI figures of 6/26 were recorded against Zimbabwe in 2015, setting a new second best set of ODI bowling figures for Pakistan as well.

Five-wicket hauls in Test cricket by Yasir Shah
No.	Date	Ground	Opponents	Inn	Overs	Runs	Wkts	Result
1	17 November 2014	Dubai Cricket Stadium, Dubai	New Zealand	3	21	79	5	Drawn
2	17 June 2015	Galle International Stadium, Galle	Sri Lanka	3	30.1	76	7	Pakistan won
3	25 June 2015	P Sara Oval, Colombo	Sri Lanka	2	41.3	96	6	Pakistan lost
4	3 July 2015	Pallekele Cricket Stadium, Pallekele	Sri Lanka	1	31.5	78	5	Pakistan lost
5	14 July 2016	Lord's, London	England	2	29	72	6	Pakistan won
6	11 August 2016	The Oval, London	England	3	29	71	5	Pakistan won
7	13 October 2016	Dubai Cricket Stadium, Dubai	West Indies	2	43	121	5	Pakistan won
8	21 October 2016	Sheikh Zayed Cricket Stadium, Abu Dhabi	West Indies	4	39	124	6	Pakistan won
9	21 April 2017	Sabina Park, Kingston	West Indies	3	21.4	63	6	Pakistan won
10	30 April 2017	Kensington Oval, Bridgetown	West Indies	3	39.5	94	7	Pakistan lost
11	10 May 2017	Windsor Park, Roseau	West Indies	4	37	92	5	Pakistan won
12	28 September 2017	Sheikh Zayed Cricket Stadium, Abu Dhabi	Sri Lanka	3	27	51	5	Pakistan lost
13	6 October 2017	Dubai International Cricket Stadium, Dubai	Sri Lanka	1	55.5	184	6	Pakistan lost
14	16 November 2018	Sheikh Zayed Cricket Stadium, Abu Dhabi	New Zealand	3	37	110	5	Pakistan lost
15	24 November 2018	Dubai International Cricket Stadium, Dubai	New Zealand	2	12.3	41	8	Pakistan won
16	24 November 2018	Dubai International Cricket Stadium, Dubai	New Zealand	3	44.5	143	6	Pakistan won

Ten-wicket hauls in Tests by Yasir Shah
No.	Figures	Date	Venue	Opponents	Result
1	10/141	14 July 2016	Lord's, London	England	Pakistan won
2	12/210	21 October 2016	Sheikh Zayed Cricket Stadium, Abu Dhabi	West Indies	Pakistan won
3	14/184	24 November 2018	Dubai International Cricket Stadium, Dubai	New Zealand	Pakistan won

Five-wicket hauls in One Day International cricket by Yasir Shah
No.	Date	Ground	Opponents	Inn	Overs	Runs	Wkts	Result
1	1 October 2015	Harare Sports Club, Harare	Zimbabwe	2	9	26	6	Pakistan won

== Awards ==
- PCB's Test Player of the year – 2017.

He was awarded the third highest civilian award of Pakistan Sitara-e-Imtiaz by President of Pakistan Arif Alvi on 23 March 2019.
