= Sarfaraz Ahmed =

Pakistani cricketer (born 1987)

Sarfaraz Ahmed SI
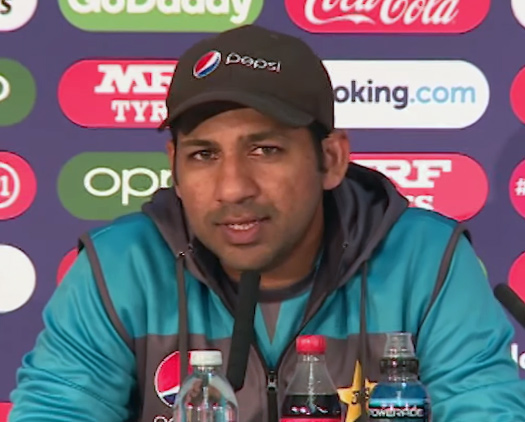
- Sarfaraz Ahmed in 2019

Personal information
- Born: 22 May 1987 (age 39); Karachi, Sindh, Pakistan
- Nickname: Saifi, Kaptaan
- Height: 1.73 m (5 ft 8 in)
- Batting: Right-handed
- Bowling: Right-arm off break
- Role: Wicket-keeper-batter

International information
- National side: Pakistan (2007–2023)
- Test debut (cap 198): 14 January 2010 v Australia
- Last Test: 14 December 2023 v Australia
- ODI debut (cap 156): 18 November 2007 v India
- Last ODI: 7 April 2021 v South Africa
- ODI shirt no.: 54
- T20I debut (cap 36): 19 February 2010 v England
- Last T20I: 22 November 2021 v Bangladesh
- T20I shirt no.: 54

Domestic team information
- Years: Team
- 2005/06–2025/26: Karachi
- 2006/07–2022/23: Sindh
- 2006/07–2013/14: PIA
- 2016–2024: Quetta Gladiators

Career statistics
Competition	Test	ODI	T20I	FC
Matches	54	117	61	184
Runs scored	3031	2315	818	9730
Batting average	37.41	33.55	27.26	41.93
100s/50s	4/21	2/11	0/3	16/66
Top score	118	105	89*	213*
Catches/stumpings	160/22	119/24	36/10	575/55
Medal record
Men's cricket
Representing Pakistan
ICC Champions Trophy
Winner	2017 England & Wales
ACC Asia Cup
Winner	2012 Bangladesh
ICC U19 Cricket World Cup
Winner	2006 Sri Lanka
- Source: ESPNcricinfo, 22 December 2025

Sarfaraz Ahmed (Urdu: سرفراز احمد; born 22 May 1987) is a Pakistani former international cricketer who played for the national team as a wicket-keeper batsman. He captained Pakistan across all three formats from 2016 to 2019, and under his captaincy the team won the 2017 ICC Champions Trophy. He was also part of Pakistan's squad that won the 2012 Asia Cup. At the Under-19 level, Sarfaraz captained Pakistan to victory in the 2006 U19 Cricket World Cup.

== Early and personal life ==
Sarfaraz Ahmed was born on 22 May 1987 in Karachi to a family with a printing press business.

Ahmed is a Muhajir, both his paternal and maternal ancestors being from Uttar Pradesh, India. While his paternal family migrated to Pakistan from Azamgarh during the partition of India, his mother, a native of Dilerganj near Kunda, India, did so after marrying his father in 1982. His father died back in 2006.

He married to Syeda Khushbakht, also a Muhajir with ancestors from Aligarh, India; in 2015 and the couple have two children.

== International career ==
=== Early career ===
==== One Day International ====
Sarfaraz's notable achievement during the early days of his career was winning the ICC U-19 World Cup in 2006 where he led the Pakistani team and defeated India in the final in a low-scoring encounter.

Sarfaraz was called up by Pakistan as a cover for Kamran Akmal who had a finger injury in the one-day series against India in November 2007. He made his ODI debut in the final match of the series, on 18 November 2007. He didn't get a chance to bat as Pakistan had won the match before he was needed to bat.

In 2008, Sarfaraz was selected ahead of Kamran Akmal for the Asia Cup.

In 2015, Sarfaraz was selected for 2015 Cricket World Cup but did not get a chance to play in the first four matches. Due to the first frequent losses, he was selected for Pakistan's fifth match of the event against South Africa where he scored 49 runs off 49 balls and took 6 catches as a wicket-keeper and equalled the ODI record for most dismissals (6 dismissals). Also, he equalled Adam Gilchrist's record for the most dismissals as a wicketkeeper in a single World Cup innings (6) He was rewarded with the 'Man of the Match' award. In his second match in the world cup, he scored 101* against Ireland and he was again named the Man of the Match. That win gave Pakistan a spot in the Quarterfinals of the World Cup.

==== Test ====
He made his Test match debut in Hobart on 14 January 2010, in the third Test match against Australia, replacing Kamran Akmal who suffered an "error-ridden performance" in the second Test. He was dropped again after one match.

==== Return to international cricket (2011) ====
Sarfaraz returned to the international team for the ODI series against Sri Lanka in November 2011 and for the subsequent series against Bangladesh and the Asia Cup. In the final of the tournament he scored a crucial 46 not out (the highest score from his team) as Pakistan won the match by 2 runs. He was consequently rewarded a Category C contract and selected for Pakistan's next series against Sri Lanka, again for T20Is.

=== Vice-captaincy ===
After Misbah retired from the ODI format of the game after the 2015 Cricket World Cup, Sarfraz was emerging to be a potential successor. However, the PCB went with Azhar Ali for the captaincy and considering Sarfaraz's leadership in the Pakistan U-19 team, appointed him as the vice-captain of the ODI team.

==== Sri Lanka Test series (2015) ====
During the first Test against Sri Lanka at Galle, Sarfaraz stabilized the Pakistan's innings with a knock of 96 runs in just 85 balls, falling just four runs short of a century when he was bowled by Sri Lankan pacer Dhammika Prasad. During his knock, he became the 7th Pakistani wicketkeeper to reach 1000 Test runs, in 28 inns, jointly the fastest Pakistani wicket-keeper with Imtiaz Ahmed. That knock also earned him the Man of the Match award.

Sarfaraz was dropped from the T20 series that followed the Test series against Sri Lanka. Many fans back home were shocked and started to raise questions. Pakistani coach Waqar Younis said on 6 August that Sarfraz is a key Pakistani player and he should be the next T20 captain of Pakistan.

==== Zimbabwe ODI series (2015) ====
Due to a foot injury sustained by usual ODI captain Azhar Ali, Sarfaraz became the captain for the third ODI against Zimbabwe on 5 October 2015. He recorded first win in his debut match as a captain.

=== Captaincy ===
==== T20I captaincy ====
After a horrendous 2016 T20 World Cup campaign, the T20I captain Shahid Afridi resigned and the PCB appointed Sarfaraz as the captain of the national T20 team on 5 April 2016. He won his first match in the only T20I against England by nine wickets. Later, in a 3-match series, his team whitewashed the 2016 ICC World Twenty20's champion, West Indies. Pakistan ranked Number 1 in ICC rankings for T20 Internationals in late 2018. Under his captaincy, Pakistan won 11 consecutive T20 series. The teams included West Indies, Australia, New Zealand, England & Zimbabwe against which Pakistan won the series. Pakistan also white-washed the opponent in a bilateral series on 5 occasions under his captaincy.

==== ODI captaincy ====
On 9 February 2017 following the resignation of then captain Azhar Ali from ODI captaincy, Sarfaraz Ahmed was chosen to succeed him. He became the full-time limited overs captain of Pakistan. He also became the vice-captain for Pakistan's Test team. In his first series as an ODI captain, Pakistan beat West Indies by 2–1.

His first major tournament as a captain was the 2017 ICC Champions Trophy. In the pool matches, Pakistan lost to India, but went on to win against South Africa and Sri Lanka to enter semi-finals. In the semi-final, Pakistan beat the host England comprehensively to enter Pakistan's first Champions Trophy final. In the final against arch-rivals India, Pakistan scored 338 batting first and won the match convincingly by 180 runs to become the champions. He was also named the captain and wicket keeper of the 'Team of the Tournament' at the 2017 Champions Trophy by the ICC and Cricinfo.

==== Test captaincy ====
On 28 September 2017, against Sri Lanka, he became the 32nd captain of Pakistan in Tests. Sri Lanka won the Test series by 2–0. It was Pakistan's first whitewash defeat in the United Arab Emirates, and only the second whitewash in a home series after losing to Australia in October 2002.

==== Suspension, dropped as captain ====
In August 2018, he was one of thirty-three players to be awarded a central contract for the 2018–19 season by the Pakistan Cricket Board. In January 2019, during the second ODI of the series against South Africa, Sarfaraz was caught on the stump mics using a racial slur towards Andile Phehlukwayo. He played in the third ODI match, but was then suspended by the International Cricket Council (ICC) for the next four matches, missing the last two ODIs and the first two T20Is of the tour. Shoaib Malik captained the Pakistan team in Sarfaraz's absence. The following month, the PCB confirmed Sarfaraz as the team's captain, and stated he would lead the squad at the 2019 Cricket World Cup.

In April 2019, he was named as the captain of Pakistan's squad for the 2019 Cricket World Cup. Under his captaincy, Pakistan managed to win five out of their nine matches, losing three and one no result. Pakistan couldn't qualify for the semi-finals as their net run rate was less than New Zealand's.

In October 2019, ahead of Pakistan's tour to Australia, Sarfaraz was sacked as captain of Pakistan's team, following Pakistan's poor run of form. Azhar Ali and Babar Azam were named as the captains of the Test and T20I squads respectively. Under his leadership, Pakistan won 29 of their matches out of 37 and reached No.1 Spot in the T20I ranking. In ODIs and under his leadership, Pakistan played 50 matches out of which they won 28 matches, lost 20 matches and had a winning rate of 58.33.

In June 2020, he was named in a 29-man squad for Pakistan's tour to England during the COVID-19 pandemic. In July, he was shortlisted in Pakistan's 20-man squad for the Test matches against England but he was overlooked and did not play a single test.

== Domestic and franchise cricket ==
Sarfaraz was picked by Quetta Gladiators in the Pakistan Super League (PSL) players' draft on 21 December 2015. He was selected to be the franchise captain for the 2016 season. He led the Gladiators all the way through to the final, losing only two matches before it. But still, his team just couldn't make it and they lost in the final to Islamabad United. In the second season of 2017, he once again led Quetta to the final, but Quetta lost by 58 runs against Peshawar. Which meant that Quetta had lost the PSL final for the second time in a row. In the third season (2018), Quetta Gladiators could not manage to qualify for the final and were defeated by Peshawar Zalmi by 1 run in the first eliminator. He once again captained Quetta Gladiators in the fourth season of PSL leading the team to win the tournament for the first time, defeating Peshawar Zalmi in the final match.

In September 2019, Sarfaraz was named the captain of Sindh for the 2019–20 Quaid-e-Azam Trophy tournament. In October 2020, he was drafted by the Galle Gladiators for the inaugural edition of the Lanka Premier League. In November 2021, he was selected to play for the Galle Gladiators following the players' draft for the 2021 Lanka Premier League. In July 2022, he was signed by the Galle Gladiators for the third edition of the Lanka Premier League.

== Cricket administration ==
In November 2025, the Pakistan Cricket Board (PCB) granted Sarfaraz Ahmed full responsibility for overseeing both the Pakistan Shaheens and the Under-19 squad. This administrative restructuring move placed Sarfaraz in charge of team operations, player development pathways, coordination with coaching staff, and long-term talent grooming. According to the PCB announcement, the decision was part of a broader effort to streamline Pakistan's developmental cricket structure and strengthen continuity between youth, A-team, and senior national setups.

Under his mentorship, the Under-19 team won the 2025 U19 Asia Cup in Dubai, United Arab Emirates.

In April 2026, he was made head coach of the Pakistan national team ahead of the Test tour in Bangladesh.

== Retirement from international cricket ==
In March 2026, Sarfaraz formally announced retirement from international cricket, bringing the curtain down on a two-decade long cricketing career at that level.

== Awards ==
- PCB's Outstanding Player of the year: 2017
- Sitara-e-Imtiaz (2018) – Pakistan's third highest civilian award
- PCB's Spirit of cricket award: 2018

Preceded by Shahid Afridi	Pakistani national cricket captain (T20I); 2016–2019	Succeeded by Babar Azam
Preceded by Azhar Ali	Pakistani national cricket captain (ODI); 2017–2019	Succeeded by Babar Azam
Preceded by Misbah-ul-Haq	Pakistani national cricket captain (Test); 2017–2019	Succeeded by Azhar Ali
