= List of Pakistan Twenty20 International cricket records =

A Twenty20 International (T20I) is a form of cricket, played between two of the international members of the International Cricket Council (ICC), in which each team faces a maximum of twenty overs. The matches have top-class status and are the highest T20 standard. The game is played under the rules of Twenty20 cricket. The first Twenty20 International match between two men's sides was played on 17 February 2005, involving Pakistan and New Zealand. Wisden Cricketers' Almanack reported that "neither side took the game especially seriously", and it was noted by Cricinfo that but for a large score for Ricky Ponting, "the concept would have shuddered". However, Ponting himself said "if it does become an international game then I'm sure the novelty won't be there all the time". This is a list of Pakistan Cricket team's Twenty20 International records. It is based on the List of Twenty20 International records, but concentrates solely on records dealing with the Pakistani cricket team. Pakistan played the first T20I in 2006.

== Key ==
The top five records are listed for each category, except for the team wins, losses, draws and ties, all round records and the partnership records. Tied records for fifth place are also included. Explanations of the general symbols and cricketing terms used in the list are given below. Specific details are provided in each category where appropriate. All records include matches played for Pakistan only, and are correct as of December 2021.

Key
Symbol	Meaning
†	Player or umpire is currently active in T20I cricket
‡	Event took place during a Cricket World Cup
*	Player remained not out or partnership remained unbroken
♠	Twenty20 International cricket record
Date	Starting date of the match
Innings	Number of innings played
Matches	Number of matches played
Opposition	The team Pakistan was playing against
Period	lved in the record
Venue	Twenty20 International cricket ground where the match was played

== Team records ==
=== Overall Record ===
Matches	Won	Lost	Tied	NR	Win %
301	174	115	4	8	57.81
Last Updated: 3 October 2026

=== Team wins, losses, draws and ties ===
As of October 2026, Pakistan has played 301 T20I matches resulting in 174 victories, 115 defeats, 4 ties and 8 no results for an overall winning percentage of 58.00

Opponent	Matches	Won	Lost	Tied	Tie+Win	Tie+Loss	No Result	% Won	First	Last
Full Members
Afghanistan	10	6	4	0	0	0	0	60.00	2013	2025
Australia	31	15	14	0	1	0	1	48.39	2007	2026
Bangladesh	27	22	5	0	0	0	0	81.48	2007	2026
England	32	9	21	0	0	1	1	28.13	2006	2026
India	18	3	14	0	0	1	0	16.67	2007	2026
Ireland	5	4	1	0	0	0	0	80.00	2009	2024
New Zealand	50	24	23	0	0	0	3	48	2007	2026
South Africa	27	14	13	0	0	0	0	51.85	2007	2025
Sri Lanka	30	18	12	0	0	0	0	60.00	2007	2026
West Indies	24	17	4	0	0	0	3	70.83	2011	2025
Zimbabwe	23	20	3	0	0	0	0	86.96	2008	2025
Associate Members
Canada	2	2	0	0	0	0	0	100.00	2008	2024
Hong Kong	2	2	0	0	0	0	0	100.00	2022	2023
Kenya	1	1	0	0	0	0	0	100.00	2007	2007
Namibia	2	2	0	0	0	0	0	100.00	2021	2026
Netherlands	3	3	0	0	0	0	0	100.00	2009	2026
Oman	1	1	0	0	0	0	0	100.00	2025	2025
Scotland	4	4	0	0	0	0	0	100.00	2007	2021
United Arab Emirates	4	4	0	0	0	0	0	100.00	2016	2025
United States	2	1	0	0	0	1	0	50	2024	2026
ICC World	3	2	1	0	0	0	0	66.67	2017	2017
Total	301	174	115	0	1	3	8	57.81	2006	2026
Statistics are correct as of Pakistan v India at Kōrogi Athletic Park, Nisshin, 3 October 2026.

=== First bilateral T20I series wins ===
Opponent	Year of first Home win	Year of first Away win
Afghanistan	2013	-
Australia	2009	-
Bangladesh	2007	2012
England	-	2006
India	YTP	-
Ireland	YTP	2024
New Zealand	2010	2018
Scotland	YTP	2018
South Africa	2021	2013
Sri Lanka	2012	2009
West Indies	2016	2013
ICC World XI	2017	YTP
Zimbabwe	2015	2011
Last Updated: 15 February 2021

=== First T20I match wins ===
Opponent	Home		Away / Neutral	
Opponent	Venue	Year	Venue	Year
Afghanistan	Sharjah Cricket Association Stadium, Sharjah, UAE	2013	Dubai International Cricket Stadium, Dubai, UAE	2021
Australia	Dubai International Cricket Stadium, Dubai, UAE	2009	New Wanderers Stadium, Johannesburg, South Africa	2007
Bangladesh	National Stadium, Karachi, Pakistan	2008	Gymkhana Club Ground, Nairobi, Kenya	2007
Canada	YTP		Maple Leaf North-West Ground, King City, Canada	2008
England	Dubai International Cricket Stadium, Dubai, UAE	2010	Bristol County Ground, Bristol, England	2006
Hong Kong	YTP		Sharjah Cricket Association Stadium, Sharjah, UAE	2022
India	YTP		M. Chinnaswamy Stadium, Bangalore, India	2012
Ireland	YTP		The Oval, London, England	2009
Kenya	YTP		Gymkhana Club Ground, Nairobi, Kenya	2007
Namibia	YTP		Sheikh Zayed Cricket Stadium, Abu Dhabi, UAE	2021
Netherlands	YTP		Lord's, London, England	2009
New Zealand	Dubai International Cricket Stadium, Dubai, UAE	2009	Sahara Park Newlands, Cape Town, South Africa	2007
Oman	YTP		Dubai International Cricket Stadium, Dubai, UAE	2025
Scotland	YTP		Sahara Stadium, Kingsmead, Durban, South Africa	2007
South Africa	Gaddafi Stadium, Lahore, Pakistan	2021	Trent Bridge, Nottingham, England	2009
Sri Lanka	Sheikh Zayed Cricket Stadium, Abu Dhabi, UAE	2011	New Wanderers Stadium, Johannesburg, South Africa	2007
United Arab Emirates	YTP		Sher-e-Bangla National Cricket Stadium, Mirpur, Bangladesh	2016
United States	YTP		Sinhalese Sports Club, Colombo	2026
West Indies	Dubai International Cricket Stadium, Dubai, UAE	2016	Arnos Vale Stadium, Kingstown, Saint Vincent and the Grenadines	2013
ICC World XI	Gaddafi Stadium, Lahore, Pakistan	2017	YTP	
Zimbabwe	Gaddafi Stadium, Lahore, Pakistan	2015	Maple Leaf North-West Ground, King City, Canada	2008
Last Updated: 11 November 2021

=== Team scoring records ===
==== Most runs in an innings ====
The highest innings total scored in T20Is has been scored twice. The first occasion came in the match between Afghanistan and Ireland when Afghanistan scored 278/3 in the 2nd T20I of the Ireland series in India in February 2019. The Czech Republic national cricket team against Turkey during the 2019 Continental Cup scored 278/4 to equal the record. The highest score for Pakistan is 205/3 scored against West Indies during the West Indies tour of Pakistan in April 2018.

Rank	Score	Opposition	Venue	Date
1	232/6	England	Trent Bridge, Nottingham, England	16 July 2021
2	215/3	Sri Lanka	Rawalpindi Cricket Stadium, Rawalpindi, Sri Lanka	11 October 2026
3	212/8	Sri Lanka	Pallekele Cricket Stadium, Pallekele, Sri Lanka	28 February 2026
4	208/3	West Indies	National Stadium, Karachi, Pakistan	16 December 2021
5	207/1	New Zealand	Eden Park, Auckland, New Zealand	21 March 2025
Last Updated: 8 September 2025

==== Fewest runs in an innings ====
The lowest innings total scored was by Turkey against Czech Republic when they were dismissed for 21 during the 2019 Continental Cup. The lowest score in T20I history for Pakistan is 74 scored against Australia in the 2012 T20I series against Australia in the UAE.

Rank	Score	Opposition	Venue	Date
1	74	Australia	Dubai International Cricket Stadium, Dubai, UAE	10 September 2012
2	82	West Indies	Sher-e-Bangla National Cricket Stadium, Mirpur, Bangladesh	1 April 2014 ‡
3	83	India	Sher-e-Bangla National Cricket Stadium, Mirpur, Bangladesh	27 February 2016
4	89	England	Sophia Gardens, Cardiff, Wales	7 September 2010
5	91	New Zealand	Hagley Oval, Christchurch, New Zealand	16 March 2025
Last Updated: 8 September 20253

==== Most runs conceded in an innings ====
Pakistan conceded highest run of 226/8 in 2024 when they tour New Zealand

Rank	Score	Opposition	Venue	Date
1	226/8	New Zealand	Eden Park, Auckland, New Zealand	12 January 2024
2	224/7	New Zealand	University Oval, Dunedin, New Zealand	17 January 2024
3	221/3	England	National Stadium, Karachi, Pakistan	23 September 2022
4	220/6	New Zealand	Mount Maunganui, New Zealand	23 March 2025
5	211/3	Sri Lanka	Dubai International Cricket Stadium, Dubai, UAE	13 December 2013
Last Updated: 8 September 2025

==== Fewest runs conceded in an innings ====
The lowest score conceded by Pakistan for a full inning is 38 when they dismissed Hong Kong in the 2022 Asia Cup.

Rank	Score	Opposition	Venue	Date
1	38	Hong Kong	Sharjah Cricket Stadium, Sharjah, United Arab Emirates	2 September 2022
2	57	Zimbabwe	Queens Sports Club, Bulawayo, Zimbabwe	3 December 2024
3	60	West Indies	National Stadium, Karachi, Pakistan	1 April 2018
4	66	Afghanistan	Sharjah Cricket Stadium, Sharjah, United Arab Emirates	7 September 2025
5	67	Oman	Dubai International Cricket Stadium, Dubai, UAE	12 September 2025
Last Updated: 8 September 2025

==== Most runs aggregate in a match ====
The highest match aggregate scored in T20Is came in the match between India and West Indies in the first T20I of the August 2016 series at Central Broward Regional Park, Lauderhill when India scored 244/4 in response to West Indies score of 245/6 to lose the match by 1 run. The first T20I of the 2021 T20I Series against England saw a total of 433 runs being scored, the most involving Pakistan.

Rank	Aggregate	Scores	Venue	Date
1	433/16	Pakistan (232/6) v England (201)	Trent Bridge, Nottingham, England	16 July 2021
2	419/14	Pakistan (212/8) v Sri Lanka (207/6)	Pallekele International Cricket Stadium, Pallekele, Sri Lanka	28 February 2026
3	416/8	Pakistan (206/5) v South Africa (210/3)	Centurion Park, Centurion, South Africa	13 December 2024
4	415/6	West Indies (207/3) v Pakistan (208/3)	National Stadium, Karachi, Pakistan	16 December 2021
5	411/11	New Zealand (204/10) v Pakistan (207/1)	Eden Park, Auckland, New Zealand	21 March 2025
Last Updated: 31 May 2026

==== Fewest runs aggregate in a match ====
The lowest match aggregate in T20Is is 57 when Turkey were dismissed for 28 by Luxembourg in the second T20I of the 2019 Continental Cup in Romania in August 2019. The lowest match aggregate in T20I history for Pakistan is 118 scored against Zimbabwe at Bulawayo.

Rank	Aggregate	Scores	Venue	Date
1	118/10	Zimbabwe (57) v Pakistan (61/0)	Queens Sports Club, Bulawayo, Zimbabwe	3 December 2024
2	168/15	Pakistan (83) v India (85/5)	Sher-e-Bangla National Cricket Stadium, Mirpur, Bangladesh	27 February 2016
3	179/13	Australia (89) v Pakistan (90/3)	Dubai International Cricket Stadium, Dubai, UAE	5 September 2012
4	179/14	Pakistan (89) v England (90/4)	Sophia Gardens, Cardiff, Wales	7 September 2010
5	182/13	New Zealand (90) v Pakistan (92/3)	Rawalpindi Cricket Stadium, Rawalpindi, Pakistan	20 April 2024
Last Updated: 20 April 2024

=== Result records ===
A T20I match is won when one side has scored more runs than the runs scored by the opposing side during their innings. If both sides have completed both their allocated innings and the side that fielded last has the higher aggregate of runs, it is known as a win by runs. This indicates the number of runs that they had scored more than the opposing side. If the side batting last wins the match, it is known as a win by wickets, indicating the number of wickets that were still to fall.

==== Greatest win margins (by runs) ====
The greatest winning margin by runs in T20Is was Czech Republic's victory over Turkey by 257 runs in the sixth match of the 2019 Continental Cup. The largest victory recorded by Pakistan was during the 2022 Asia Cup against Hong Kong by 155 runs.

Rank	Margin	Opposition	Venue	Date
1	155 Runs	Hong Kong	Sharjah Cricket Stadium, Sharjah, United Arab Emirates	2 September 2022
2	143 Runs	West Indies	National Stadium, Karachi, Pakistan	1 April 2018
3	111 Runs	Australia	Gaddafi Stadium, Lahore, Pakistan	1 February 2026
4	103 Runs	New Zealand	Lancaster Park, Christchurch, New Zealand	30 December 2010
5	102 Runs	Bangladesh	National Stadium, Karachi, Pakistan	20 April 2008
5	102 Runs	Namibia	Sinhalese Sports Club, Colombo, Sri Lanka	18 February 2026
Last Updated: 2 September 2022

==== Greatest win margins (by balls remaining) ====
Rank	Balls remaining	Margin	Opposition	Venue	Date
1	87	10 wickets	Zimbabwe	Queens Sports Club, Bulawayo, Zimbabwe	3 December 2024
2	47	7 wickets	New Zealand	Rawalpindi Cricket Stadium, Rawalpindi, UAE	20 April 2024
3	41	6 wickets	New Zealand	The Oval, London, England	13 June 2009 ‡
4	37	6 wickets	Netherlands	Perth Stadium, Perth, Australia	30 October 2022 ‡
5	36	8 wickets	Kenya	Gymkhana Club Ground, Nairobi, Kenya	4 September 2007
6	34	9 wickets	West Indies	Dubai International Cricket Stadium, Dubai, UAE	23 September 2016
Last Updated: 20 April 2024

==== Greatest win margins (by wickets) ====
Pakistan have won a T20I match by 10 wickets twice, once against India and once against England.

Rank	Margin	Opposition	Venue	Date
1	10 wickets	India	Dubai International Cricket Stadium, Dubai, United Arab Emirates	24 October 2021
1	10 wickets	England	National Stadium, Karachi, Pakistan	22 September 2022
1	10 wickets	Zimbabwe	Queen's Sports Club, Bulawayo, Zimbabwe	3 December 2024
2	9 wickets	England	Old Trafford Cricket Ground, Manchester, England	7 September 2016
2	9 wickets	West Indies	Dubai International Cricket Stadium, Dubai, UAE	23 September 2016
2	9 wickets	Bangladesh	Gaddafi Stadium, Lahore, Pakistan	25 January 2020
2	9 wickets	South Africa	Centurion Park, Centurion, South Africa	14 April 2021
2	9 wickets	New Zealand	Eden Park, Auckland, New Zealand	21 March 2025
Last updated: 22 September 2022

==== Highest successful run chases ====
Australia holds the record for the highest successful run chase which they achieved when they scored 245/5 in response to New Zealand's 243/6. The largest target chased by Pakistan was against Australia in the final of the 2018 Zimbabwe Tri-Nation Series

Rank	Score	Target	Opposition	Venue	Date
1	208/3	208	West Indies	National Stadium, Karachi, Pakistan	16 December 2021
2	207/1	205	New Zealand	Eden Park, Auckland, New Zealand	21 March 2025
3	205/1	204	South Africa	Centurion Park, Centurion, South Africa	14 April 2021
4	203/0	200	England	National Stadium, Karachi, Pakistan	22 September 2022
5	197/3	197	Bangladesh	Gaddafi Stadium, Lahore, Pakistan	1 June 2025
Last Updated: 8 September 2025

==== Narrowest win margins (by runs) ====
The narrowest run margin victory is by 1 run which has been achieved in 15 T20I's. Pakistan has not won a game by such margin. The smallest has been by 2 runs.

Rank	Margin	Opposition	Venue	Date
1	2 Runs	New Zealand	Sheikh Zayed Cricket Stadium, Abu Dhabi, UAE	31 October 2018
2	3 Runs	West Indies	Queen's Park Oval, Port of Spain, Trinidad and Tobago	30 March 2017
2	3 Runs	South Africa	Gaddafi Stadium, Lahore, Pakistan	11 February 2021
2	3 Runs	England	National Stadium, Karachi, Pakistan	25 September 2022
4	5 Runs	Zimbabwe	Harare Sports Club, Harare, Zimbabwe	18 September 2011
4	5 Runs	England	Old Trafford, Manchester, England	1 September 2020
4	5 Runs	Sri Lanka	Pallekele International Cricket Stadium, Pallekele, Sri Lanka	28 February 2026
Last Updated: 31 May 2026

==== Narrowest win margins (by balls remaining) ====
The narrowest winning margin by balls remaining in T20Is is by winning of the last ball which has been achieved 27 times. Pakistan has achieve victory of the last ball on two occasions.

Rank	Balls remaining	Margin	Opposition	Venue	Date
1	0	2 wickets	West Indies	Arnos Vale Stadium, Kingstown, Saint Vincent and the Grenadines	27 July 2013
1	0	5 wickets	Bangladesh	Sher-e-Bangla National Cricket Stadium, Dhaka, Bangladesh	22 November 2021
2	1	3 wickets	Sri Lanka	Maple Leaf North-West Ground, King City, Canada	11 October 2008
2	1	6 wickets	Afghanistan	Sharjah Cricket Association Stadium, Sharjah, UAE	8 December 2013
2	1	2 wickets	Sri Lanka	Sheikh Zayed Cricket Stadium, Abu Dhabi, UAE	27 October 2017
Last Updated: 22 November 2021

==== Narrowest win margins (by wickets) ====
The narrowest margin of victory by wickets is 1 wicket which has settled four such T20Is. Pakistan has won once by this margin.

Rank	Margin	Opposition	Venue	Date
1	1 wicket	Sri Lanka	Ranasinghe Premadasa Stadium, Colombo, Sri Lanka	1 August 2015
1	1 wicket	Afghanistan	Sharjah Cricket Stadium, Sharjah, United Arab Emirates	7 September 2022
2	2 wickets	South Africa	Ranasinghe Premadasa Stadium, Colombo, Sri Lanka	28 September 2012 ‡
2	2 wickets	West Indies	Arnos Vale Stadium, Kingstown, Saint Vincent and the Grenadines	27 July 2013
2	2 wickets	Zimbabwe	Gaddafi Stadium, Lahore, Pakistan	24 May 2015
Last Updated: 8 September 2022

==== Greatest loss margins (by runs) ====
Pakistan's biggest defeat by runs was against New Zealand in the 2016 T20I series at Westpac Stadium, Wellington, New Zealand.

Rank	Margin	Opposition	Venue	Date
1	115 runs	New Zealand	Bay Oval, Mount Maunganui, New Zealand	23 March 2025
2	95 runs	New Zealand	Westpac Stadium, Wellington, New Zealand	22 January 2016
3	94 runs	Australia	Dubai International Cricket Stadium, Dubai, UAE	10 September 2012
4	84 runs	West Indies	Sher-e-Bangla National Cricket Stadium, Mirpur, Bangladesh	1 April 2014 ‡
5	67 runs	England	Gaddafi Stadium, Lahore, Pakistan	2 October 2022
Last Updated: 2 October 2022

==== Greatest loss margins (by balls remaining) ====
The largest defeat suffered by Pakistan was against Australia in Zimbabwe during the 2018 Zimbabwe Tri-Nation Series when they lost by 9 wickets with 55 balls remaining.

Rank	Balls remaining	Margin	Opposition	Venue	Date
1	55	9 wickets	Australia	Harare Sports Club, Harare, Zimbabwe	2 July 2018
2	51	10 wickets	South Africa	New Wanderers Stadium, Johannesburg, South Africa	2 February 2007
3	49	10 wickets	Australia	Optus Stadium, Perth, Australia	8 November 2019
4	36	6 wickets	England	Sophia Gardens, Cardiff, Wales	7 September 2010
4	36	6 wickets	Australia	Dubai International Cricket Stadium, Dubai, UAE	5 October 2014
4	36	6 wickets	South Africa	Wanderers Stadium, Johannesburg, South Africa	12 April 2021
Last Updated: 12 April 2021

==== Greatest loss margins (by wickets) ====
Pakistan have lost a T20I match by a margin of 10 wickets on three occasions.

Rank	Margins	Opposition	Most recent venue	Date
1	10 wickets	South Africa	New Wanderers Stadium, Johannesburg, South Africa	2 February 2007
1	10 wickets	New Zealand	Seddon Park, Hamilton, New Zealand	17 January 2016
1	10 wickets	Australia	Optus Stadium, Perth, Australia	8 November 2019
4	9 wickets	South Africa	Dubai International Cricket Stadium, Dubai, UAE	13 November 2013
4	9 wickets	Australia	Harare Sports Club, Harare, Zimbabwe	2 July 2018
4	9 wickets	New Zealand	Seddon Park, Hamilton, New Zealand	20 December 2020
4	9 wickets	New Zealand	Hagley Oval, Christchurch, New Zealand	11 October 2022
4	9 wickets	New Zealand	Hagley Oval, Christchurch, New Zealand	16 March 2025
Last Updated: 20 December 2020

==== Narrowest loss margins (by runs) ====
The narrowest loss of Pakistan in terms of runs is by 1 run suffered twice.

Rank	Margin	Opposition	Venue	Date
1	1 run	New Zealand	Kensington Oval, Bridgetown, Barbados	8 May 2010 ‡
1	1 run	Zimbabwe	Perth Stadium, Perth, Australia	27 October 2022 ‡
3	2 runs	Australia	Melbourne Cricket Ground, Melbourne, Australia	5 February 2010
4	3 runs	England	Dubai International Cricket Stadium, Dubai, UAE	27 November 2015
5	4 runs	South Africa	New Wanderers Stadium, Johannesburg, South Africa	20 November 2013
5	4 runs	New Zealand	Gaddafi Stadium, Lahore, Pakistan	17 April 2023
5	4 runs	New Zealand	Gaddafi Stadium, Lahore, Pakistan	25 April 2024
Last Updated: 25 April 2024

==== Narrowest loss margins (by balls remaining) ====
The narrowest defeat in terms of balls remaining for Pakistan has been loss with no balls remaining once.

Rank	Balls remaining	Margin	Opposition	Venue	Date
1	0	4 wickets	India	Melbourne Cricket Ground, Melbourne, Australia	23 October 2022 ‡
1	0	6 wickets	Bangladesh	Zhejiang University of Technology Cricket Field, Hangzhou, China	7 October 2023
1	0	2 wickets	West Indies	Central Broward Park, Lauderhill, USA	2 August 2025
4	1	3 wickets	Australia	Darren Sammy National Cricket Stadium, Gros Islet, Saint Lucia	14 May 2010 ‡
4	1	7 wickets	ICC World-XI	Gaddafi Stadium, Lahore, Pakistan	13 September 2017
4	1	7 wickets	Afghanistan	Sharjah Cricket Stadium, Sharjah, United Arab Emirates	26 March 2023
4	1	5 wickets	Ireland	Castle Avenue, Dublin, Ireland	10 May 2024
4	1	2 wickets	Zimbabwe	Queens Sports Club, Bulawayo, Zimbabwe	5 December 2024
Last Updated: 31 May 2026

==== Narrowest loss margins (by wickets) ====
Pakistan has suffered defeat by 3 wickets once.

Rank	Margin	Opposition	Venue	Date
1	2 wickets	Zimbabwe	Queens Sports Club, Bulawayo, Zimbabwe	5 December 2024
2	3 wickets	Australia	Darren Sammy National Cricket Stadium, Gros Islet, Saint Lucia	14 May 2010 ‡
2	3 wickets	England	Old Trafford, Manchester, England	20 July 2021
2	3 wickets	Australia	Gaddafi Stadium, Lahore, Pakistan	5 April 2022
Last Updated: 28 January 2023

==== Tied matches ====
A tie can occur when the scores of both teams are equal at the conclusion of play, provided that the side batting last has completed their innings. There have been 19 ties in T20Is history with Pakistan involved in two such game.

Opposition	Venue	Date
India	Sahara Stadium, Kingsmead, Durban, South Africa	14 September 2007 ‡
Australia	Dubai International Cricket Stadium, Dubai, UAE	7 September 2012
England	Sharjah Cricket Association Stadium, Sharjah, UAE	30 November 2015
United States	Grand Prairie Stadium, Dallas, United States	6 June 2024 ‡
Last updated: 3 December 2017

== Batting records ==
=== Most career runs ===
A run is the basic means of scoring in cricket. A run is scored when the batsman hits the ball with his bat and with his partner runs the length of 22 yards (20 m) of the pitch. Babar Azam is the leading Pakistani batsman on this list.

Rank	Runs	Player	Matches	Innings	Average	Period
1	4,596	Babar Azam†	145	136	38.94	2016–2026
2	3,414	Mohammad Rizwan	106	93	47.41	2015–2024
3	2,514	Mohammad Hafeez	119	108	26.46	2006–2021
5	2,494	Fakhar Zaman†	120	110	23.98	2017–2026
4	2,423	Shoaib Malik	123	110	31.46	2006–2021
6	1,690	Umar Akmal	84	79	26.00	2009-2019
7	1,471	Ahmed Shehzad	59	59	25.80	2009-2019
8	1,405	Shahid Afridi	98	90	18.01	2006-2016
10	1,305	Sahibzada Farhan†	46	45	30.34	2018-2026
9	1,298	Saim Ayub†	67	64	21.27	2023-2026
Last Updated: 1 March 2026

=== Fastest runs getter ===
Runs	Batsman	Innings	Record Date	Reference
1,000	Babar Azam†	26	4 November 2018	
2,000	Babar Azam†	52	25 April 2021	
2,000	Mohammad Rizwan†	52	20 September 2022	
2,500	Babar Azam†	62	11 November 2021	
3,000	Mohammad Rizwan†	79	20 April 2024	

=== Most runs in each batting position ===
Batting position	Batsman	Innings	Runs	Average	Career Span	Ref
Opener	Mohammad Rizwan	76	3,162	51.83	2020–2024	
Number 3	Babar Azam†	40	1,372	42.87	2016–2025	
Number 4	Shoaib Malik	43	1,013	28.94	2007–2020	
Number 5	Shoaib Malik	47	1,043	33.64	2007-2021	
Number 6	Shahid Afridi	32	468	18.00	2007–2016	
Number 7	Mohammad Nawaz†	30	462	23.10	2016–2016	
Number 8	Faheem Ashraf†	26	313	14.90	2017–2026	
Number 9	Shaheen Afridi†	23	217	18.00	2020–2026	
Number 10	Saeed Ajmal	14	75	9.37	2009–2014	
Number 11	Haris Rauf	8	23	4.60	2020–2024	
Last Updated: 1 March 2026

=== Highest career average ===
A batsman's batting average is the total number of runs they have scored divided by the number of times they have been dismissed.

Rank	Average	Player	Innings	Not out	Runs	Period
1	47.41	Mohammad Rizwan	89	21	3,313	2015–2024
2	41.05	Babar Azam†	116	15	4,145	2016–2024
3	37.52	Misbah-ul-Haq	34	13	788	2007–2012
4	31.46	Shoaib Malik	110	33	2,423	2006–2021
5	28.33	Salman Butt	23	2	595	2016–2022
Qualification: 20 innings. Last Updated: 16 June 2024

=== Highest Average in each batting position ===
Batting position	Batsman	Innings	Runs	Average	Career Span	Ref
Opener	Mohammad Rizwan	68	2,951	54.64	2020–2024	
Number 3	Babar Azam†	28	1,067	46.39	2016–2024	
Number 4	Sarfaraz Ahmed	15	442	36.83	2016–2021	
Number 5	Misbah-ul-Haq	11	236	39.33	2008–2012	
Number 6	Misbah-ul-Haq	10	271	45.16	2007–2012	
Number 7	Iftikhar Ahmed†	11	165	41.25	2019–2024	
Number 8	Shadab Khan†	10	93	15.50	2017–2023	
Number 9	Shaheen Shah Afridi†	18	176	17.60	2020–2025	
Number 10	Haris Rauf†	13	66	9.42	2020–2025	
Number 11	Mohammad Hasnain†	7	9	9.00	2019–2022	
Qualification: Minimum 10 innings batted at position. Last Updated: 30 May 2024

=== Highest individual score ===
Babar Azam scored the highest individual score for Pakistan during the 3rd T20I game against South Africa at SuperSport Park.

Rank	Runs	Player	Opposition	Venue	Date
1	122	Babar Azam	South Africa	SuperSport Park, Centurion, South Africa	14 April 2021
2	111*	Ahmed Shehzad	Bangladesh	Sher-e-Bangla National Cricket Stadium, Mirpur, Bangladesh	30 March 2014 ‡
3	110*	Babar Azam	England	National Stadium, Karachi, Pakistan	22 September 2022
4	107*	Muhammad Haris	Bangladesh	Gaddafi Stadium, Lahore, Pakistan	1 June 2025
5	105*	Hassan Nawaz	New Zealand	Eden Park, Auckland, New Zealand	21 March 2025
Last Updated: 21 March 2025

=== Highest individual score – progression of record ===
Runs	Player	Opponent	Venue	Season
46	Mohammad Hafeez	England	Bristol County Ground, Bristol, England	28 August 2006
49	Imran Nazir	Bangladesh	Gymkhana Club Ground, Nairobi, Kenya	2 September 2007
53	Misbah-ul-Haq	India	Sahara Stadium, Kingsmead, Durban, South Africa	14 September 2007 ‡
57	Shoaib Malik	Sri Lanka	New Wanderers Stadium, Johannesburg, South Africa	17 September 2007 ‡
66*	Misbah-ul-Haq	Australia	New Wanderers Stadium, Johannesburg, South Africa	18 September 2007 ‡
87*	Misbah-ul-Haq	Bangladesh	National Stadium, Karachi, Pakistan	20 April 2008
98*	Ahmed Shehzad	Zimbabwe	Harare Sports Club, Harare, Zimbabwe	24 August 2013
111*	Ahmed Shehzad	Bangladesh	Sher-e-Bangla National Cricket Stadium, Mirpur, Bangladesh	30 March 2014 ‡
122	Babar Azam	South Africa	SuperSport Park, Centurion, South Africa	14 April 2021
Last Updated: 14 April 2021

=== Most half-centuries ===
A half-century is a score of between 50 and 99 runs. Statistically, once a batsman's score reaches 100, it is no longer considered a half-century but a century. Babar Azam has the most fifties among Pakistani batsmen.

Rank	Half centuries	Player	Innings	Runs	Period
1	39	Babar Azam†	112	4,023	2016–2024
2	29	Mohammad Rizwan	85	3,203	2015–2024
3	14	Mohammad Hafeez	108	2,514	2006–2021
4	13	Fakhar Zaman†	100	2,239	2017–2025
5	9	Shoaib Malik	110	2,423	2006–2021
Last Updated: 27 September 2025

=== Most centuries ===
A century is a score of 100 or more runs by a batsman in a single innings.

Babar Azam has scored three centuries, while Ahmed Shahzad, Mohammad Rizwan, Hassan Nawaz, Muhammad Haris and Sahibzada Farhan have one century each for Pakistan.

Rank	Centuries	Player	Innings	Runs	Period
1	3	Babar Azam†	135	4,571	2016-2026
2	1	Mohammad Rizwan	93	3,414	2015–2024
2	1	Ahmed Shehzad	59	1,471	2009–2019
2	1	Hassan Nawaz	24	457	2025-2025
2	1	Muhammad Haris	34	555	2022-2025
2	1	Sahibzada Farhan†	43	1,142	2018-2026
Last Updated: 18 February 2026

=== Most sixes ===
Rank	Sixes	Player	Innings	Period
1	92	Mohammad Rizwan	89	2015–2024
2	76	Fakhar Zaman†	84	2017–2024
2	76	Mohammad Hafeez	108	2006–2021
4	73	Shahid Afridi	90	2006–2016
5	72	Babar Azam†	116	2016–2024
Last Updated: 20 June 2024

=== Most fours ===
Rank	Fours	Player	Innings	Period
1	432	Babar Azam†	112	2016–2024
2	273	Mohammad Rizwan	85	2015–2024
3	251	Mohammad Hafeez	108	2006–2021
4	195	Shoaib Malik	110	2006–2021
5	171	Fakhar Zaman†	59	2017–2024
Last Updated: 30 May 2024

=== Highest strike rates ===
Rank	Strike rate	Player	Runs	Balls Faced	Period
1	154.39	Hasan Nawaz †	357	296	2025–2025
2	150.75	Shahid Afridi	1,405	932	2006–2016
3	144.14	Shadab Khan †	1,009	700	2017–2026
4	137.18	Faheem Ashraf †	594	433	2017–2026
5	136.64	Sahibzada Farhan †	1,205	955	2018–2026
Qualification= 250 balls faced. Last Updated: 1 March 2026

=== Highest strike rates in an innings ===
Rank	Strike rate	Player	Runs	Balls Faced	Opposition	Venue	Date
1	375.00	Salman Agha	45	12	Sri Lanka	Rangiri Cricket Stadium, Dambulla, Sri Lanka	12 January 2026
2	357.14	Shahid Afridi	25	7	South Africa	Sheikh Zayed Cricket Stadium, Abu Dhabi, UAE	26 October 2010
2	357.14	Asif Ali	25*	7	Afghanistan	Dubai International Cricket Stadium, Dubai, UAE	29 October 2021 ‡
4	337.50	Saim Ayub	27	8	New Zealand	Eden Park, Auckland, New Zealand	12 January 2024
5	325.00	Fakhar Zaman	26	8	England	Trent Bridge, Nottingham, England	16 July 2021
Last Updated: 1 March 2026

=== Most runs in a calendar year ===
Rank	Runs	Player	Matches	Innings	Year
1	1,326	Mohammad Rizwan	29	26	2021
2	996	Mohammad Rizwan	25	25	2022
3	939	Babar Azam	29	26	2021
4	771	Sahibzada Farhan	26	26	2025
5	738	Babar Azam	24	23	2024
Last Updated: 1 March 2026

=== Most runs in a series ===
Rank	Runs	Player	Matches	Innings	Series
1	383	Sahibzada Farhan	7	6	2026 Men's T20 World Cup
2	316	Mohammad Rizwan	6	6	English cricket team in Pakistan in 2022-23
3	303	Babar Azam	6	6	2021 ICC World Twenty20
4	285	Babar Azam	7	7	English cricket team in Pakistan in 2022-23
5	281	Mohammad Rizwan	6	6	2021 ICC World Twenty20
5	281	Mohammad Rizwan	6	6	2022 Asia Cup
Last Updated: 1 March 2026

=== Most ducks ===
A duck refers to a batsman being dismissed without scoring a run.

Rank	Ducks	Player	Innings	Period
1	10	Saim Ayub	64	2023–2026
1	10	Umar Akmal	79	2009–2019
1	10	Babar Azam	136	2016–2026
4	9	Mohammad Nawaz	69	2016–2026
5	8	Shahid Afridi	90	2006–2016
Last Updated: 1 March 2026

== Bowling records ==
=== Most career wickets ===
A bowler takes the wicket of a batsman when the form of dismissal is bowled, caught, leg before wicket, stumped or hit wicket. If the batsman is dismissed by run out, obstructing the field, handling the ball, hitting the ball twice or timed out the bowler does not receive credit.

Rank	Wickets	Player	Matches	Innings	Period
1	110	Haris Rauf†	78	76	2020–2024
2	107	Shadab Khan†	104	96	2017–2024
3	100	Shaheen Afridi†	74	74	2018–2024
4	97	Shahid Afridi	98	96	2006–2016
5	85	Umar Gul	60	60	2007–2016
5	85	Saeed Ajmal	64	63	2009–2015
Last Updated: 13 December 2024

=== Best figures in an innings ===
Bowling figures refers to the number of the wickets a bowler has taken and the number of runs conceded.

Rank	Figures	Player	Opposition	Venue	Date
1	5/3	Sufiyan Muqeem	Zimbabwe	Queens Sports Club, Bulawayo, Zimbabwe	3 December 2024
2	5/6	Umar Gul	New Zealand	The Oval, London, England	13 June 2009 ‡
2	5/6	Umar Gul	South Africa	Centurion Park, Centurion, South Africa	3 March 2013
4	5/14	Imad Wasim	West Indies	Dubai International Cricket Stadium, Dubai, United Arab Emirates	23 September 2016
5	5/18	Mohammad Nawaz	Australia	Gaddafi Stadium, Lahore, Pakistan	1 February 2026
Last Updated: 9 September 2025

=== Best figures in an innings – progression of record ===
Figures	Player	Opposition	Venue	Date
3/30	Abdul Razzaq	England	Bristol County Ground, Bristol, England	28 August 2006
3/18	Younis Khan	Kenya	Gymkhana Club Ground, Nairobi, Kenya	4 September 2007
4/19	Shahid Afridi	Scotland	Sahara Stadium, Kingsmead, Durban, South Africa	12 September 2007 ‡
4/18	Mohammad Asif	India	Sahara Stadium, Kingsmead, Durban, South Africa	14 September 2007 ‡
4/13	Umar Gul	Sri Lanka	Maple Leaf Cricket Club, King City, Canada	11 October 2008
4/8	Umar Gul	Australia	Dubai International Cricket Stadium, Dubai, UAE	7 May 2009
5/6	Umar Gul	New Zealand	The Oval, London, England	13 June 2009 ‡
5/6	Umar Gul	South Africa	Centurion Park, Centurion, South Africa	3 March 2013
5/3	Sufiyan Muqeem	Zimbabwe	Queens Sports Club, Bulawayo, Zimbabwe	3 December 2024
Last Updated: 3 December 2024

=== Best career average ===
A bowler's bowling average is the total number of runs they have conceded divided by the number of wickets they have taken.

Rank	Average	Player	Wickets	Runs	Balls	Period
1	16.97	Umar Gul	85	1,443	1,203	2007–2016
2	17.36	Abrar Ahmed†	52	903	812	2024–2026
3	17.83	Saeed Ajmal	85	1,516	1,430	2009–2015
4	20.88	Mohammad Nawaz†	101	2,109	1,760	2016–2026
5	21.10	Haris Rauf†	77	2,807	2,009	2020–2025
Qualification: 500 balls. Last Updated: 15 March 2026

=== Best career economy rate ===
A bowler's economy rate is the total number of runs they have conceded divided by the number of overs they have bowled.

Rank	Economy rate	Player	Wickets	Runs	Balls	Period
1	6.20	Imad Wasim	73	1,588	1,536	2015–2024
2	6.36	Saeed Ajmal	85	1,516	1,430	2009–2015
3	6.60	Mohammad Hafeez	61	1,388	1,261	2017–2021
4	6.61	Shahid Afridi	97	2,362	2,144	2006–2016
5	6.67	Abrar Ahmed†	52	903	812	2024–2026
Qualification: 500 balls. Last Updated: 15 March 2026

=== Best career strike rate ===
A bowler's strike rate is the total number of balls they have bowled divided by the number of wickets they have taken.

Rank	Strike rate	Player	Wickets	Runs	Balls	Period
1	14.15	Umar Gul	85	1,443	1,203	2007–2016
2	15.10	Haris Rauf†	77	2,807	2,009	2020–2025
3	15.61	Abrar Ahmed†	52	903	812	2024–2026
4	15.64	Mohammad Wasim†	42	903	657	2021–2026
5	16.04	Hasan Ali†	72	1,674	1,155	2016–2025
Qualification: 500 balls. Last Updated: 15 March 2026

=== Most four-wickets (& over) hauls in an innings ===
Pakistan's Umar Gul has taken the most four-wickets (or over) among all the bowlers.

Rank	Four-wicket hauls	Player	Matches	Balls	Wickets	Period
1	6 ♠	Umar Gul	60	1,203	85	2007–2016
2	4	Saeed Ajmal	64	1,430	85	2009–2015
3	3	Shadab Khan†	78	1,663	87	2017–2022
3	3	Shahid Afridi	98	2,144	97	2006–2016
3	3	Haris Rauf†	59	1273	80	2015–2023
Last Updated: 16 April 2023

=== Best economy rates in an inning ===
The best economy rate in an inning, when a minimum of 12 balls are delivered by the bowler, is Sri Lankan player Nuwan Kulasekara economy of 0.00 during his spell of 0 runs for 1 wicket in 2 overs against the Netherlands at Zohur Ahmed Chowdhury Stadium in the 2014 ICC World Twenty20. Mohammad Amir holds the two positions for Pakistan.

Rank	Economy	Player	Overs	Runs	Wickets	Opposition	Venue	Date
1	1.12	Sufiyan Muqeem	2.4	3	5	Zimbabwe	Queen's Sports Club, Bulawayo, Zimbabwe	3 December 2024
2	1.50	Mohammad Amir	4	6	2	United Arab Emirates	Sher-e-Bangla National Cricket Stadium, Mirpur, Bangladesh	29 February 2016
2	1.50	Mohammad Amir	4	3	2	West Indies	National Stadium, Karachi, Pakistan	1 April 2018
2	1.50	Mohammad Hafeez	4	6	1	West Indies	Providence Stadium, Providence, Guyana	31 July 2021
5	1.75	Shadab Khan †	4	7	3	West Indies	Kensington Oval, Bridgetown, Barbados	26 March 2017
Qualification: 12 balls bowled. Last Updated: 31 July 2021

=== Best strike rates in an inning ===
The best strike rate in an inning, when a minimum of 4 wickets are taken by the player, is by Steve Tikolo of Kenya during his spell of 4/2 in 1.2 overs against Scotland during the 2013 ICC World Twenty20 Qualifier at ICC Academy, Dubai, UAE. Umar Gul has the lowest strike rate in an inning among Pakistani bowlers.

Rank	Strike rate	Player	Wickets	Runs	Balls	Opposition	Venue	Date
1	2.8	Umar Gul	5	6	14	South Africa	Centurion Park, Centurion, South Africa	3 March 2013
2	3.5	Mohammad Hafeez	4	10	14	Zimbabwe	Harare Sports Club, Harare, Zimbabwe	16 September 2011
3	3.6	Umar Gul	5	6	18	New Zealand	The Oval, London, England	13 June 2009 ‡
4	4.2	Shahid Afridi	4	14	17	New Zealand	Lancaster Park, Christchurch, New Zealand	30 December 2010
5	4.5	Umar Gul	4	13	18	Sri Lanka	Maple Leaf North-West Ground, King City, Canada	11 October 2008
Last Updated: 9 August 2020

=== Worst figures in an innings ===
The worst figures in a T20I came in the Sri Lanka's tour of Australia when Kasun Rajitha of Sri Lanka had figures of 0/75 off his four overs at Adelaide Oval, Adelaide. The worst figures by a Pakistani is 0/63 that came off the bowling of Usman Shinwari in the 2019 tour of South Africa at New Wanderers Stadium, Johannesburg, South Africa.

Rank	Figures	Player	Overs	Opposition	Venue	Date
1	0/63	Usman Shinwari	4	South Africa	New Wanderers Stadium, Johannesburg, South Africa	3 February 2019
2	0/53	Mohammad Sami	4	Australia	Punjab Cricket Association Stadium, Mohali, India	25 March 2016 ‡
3	0/52	Usman Shinwari	4	Sri Lanka	Dubai International Cricket Stadium, Dubai, UAE	13 December 2013
4	0/49	Mohammad Hasnain	4	West Indies	National Stadium, Karachi, Pakistan	16 December 2021
5	0/48	Hasan Ali	4	South Africa	New Wanderers Stadium, Johannesburg, South Africa	3 February 2019
5	0/48	Shadab Khan	4	England	Old Trafford, Manchester, England	1 September 2020
Last Updated: 16 December 2021

=== Most runs conceded in a match ===
Kasun Rajitha also holds the dubious distinction of most runs conceded in a T20I during the aforementioned match. Usman Shnwari in the above-mentioned spell conceded the most runs for Pakistani bowler.

Rank	Figures	Player	Overs	Opposition	Venue	Date
1	0/63	Usman Shinwari †	4	South Africa	New Wanderers Stadium, Johannesburg, South Africa	3 February 2019
2	1/55	Faheem Ashraf †	4	New Zealand	Bay Oval, Tauranga, New Zealand	28 January 2018
3	1/54	Mohammad Sami	4	Australia	Darren Sammy National Cricket Stadium, Gros Islet, Saint Lucia	2 May 2010 ‡
4	0/53	Mohammad Sami	4	Australia	Punjab Cricket Association Stadium, Mohali, India	25 March 2016 ‡
5	0/52	Usman Shinwari	4	Sri Lanka	Dubai International Cricket Stadium, Dubai, UAE	13 December 2013
5	3/52	Shadab Khan	4	England	Trent Bridge, Nottingham, England	16 July 2021
Last updated: 16 July 2021

=== Most wickets in a calendar year ===
Rank	Wickets	Player	Innings	Year
1	32	Shaheen Afridi†	18	2024
2	31	Haris Rauf	23	2022
3	28	Shadab Khan	19	2018
4	25	Saeed Ajmal	16	2012
4	25	Hasan Ali	17	2021
4	25	Haris Rauf	21	2021
Last Updated: 20 June 2024

=== Most wickets in a series ===
Rank	Wickets	Player	Matches	Series
1	13	Umar Gul	7	2007 ICC World Twenty20
1	13	Umar Gul	7	2009 ICC World Twenty20
3	12	Shahid Afridi	7	2007 ICC World Twenty20
3	12	Saeed Ajmal	7	2009 ICC World Twenty20
5	11	Shahid Afridi	7	2009 ICC World Twenty20
5	11	Saeed Ajmal	6	2010 ICC World Twenty20
5	11	Shaheen Afridi	7	2022 ICC World Twenty20
Last Updated: 9 August 2020

=== Hat-trick ===
In cricket, a hat-trick occurs when a bowler takes three wickets with consecutive deliveries. The deliveries may be interrupted by an over bowled by another bowler from the other end of the pitch or the other team's innings, but must be three consecutive deliveries by the individual bowler in the same match. Only wickets attributed to the bowler count towards a hat-trick; run outs do not count.

S. No	Bowler	Against	Wickets	Venue	Date	Ref.
1	Faheem Ashraf	Sri Lanka	Isuru Udana (c Hasan Ali); Mahela Udawatte (c Babar Azam); Dasun Shanaka (lbw)	(United Arab Emirates) Sheikh Zayed Cricket Stadium, Abu Dhabi	27 October 2017	
2	Mohammad Hasnain	Sri Lanka	Bhanuka Rajapaksa (lbw); Dasun Shanaka (c Umar Akmal); Shehan Jayasuriya (c Ahmed Shehzad)	(Pakistan) Gaddafi Stadium, Lahore	5 October 2019	
3	Mohammad Nawaz	Afghanistan	Darwish Rasooli (lbw); Azmatullah Omarzai (c Mohammad Haris); Ibrahim Zadran (st Mohammad Haris)	(United Arab Emirates) Sharjah Cricket Stadium, Sharjah	7 September 2025	
4	Usman Tariq	Zimbabwe	Tony Munyonga (c Naseem Shah); Tashinga Musekiwa (b); Wellington Masakadza (c Babar Azam)	(Pakistan) Rawalpindi Cricket Stadium, Rawalpindi	23 November 2025	
Last Updated: 13 April 2026

== Wicket-keeping records ==
The wicket-keeper is a specialist fielder who stands behind the stumps being guarded by the batsman on strike and is the only member of the fielding side allowed to wear gloves and leg pads.

=== Most career dismissals ===
A wicket-keeper can be credited with the dismissal of a batsman in two ways, caught or stumped. A fair catch is taken when the ball is caught fully within the field of play without it bouncing after the ball has touched the striker's bat or glove holding the bat, Laws 5.6.2.2 and 5.6.2.3 state that the hand or the glove holding the bat shall be regarded as the ball striking or touching the bat while a stumping occurs when the wicket-keeper puts down the wicket while the batsman is out of his ground and not attempting a run.

Rank	Dismissals	Player	Matches	Innings	Catches	Stumping	Dis/Inn	Period
1	60	Kamran Akmal	58	53	28	32	1.132	2006–2014
2	52	Mohammad Rizwan	93	84	41	11	0.619	2015–2024
3	46	Sarfaraz Ahmed	61	61	36	10	0.754	2010–2021
4	13	Umar Akmal	84	20	11	2	0.650	2010–2014
5	3	Rohail Nazir	3	3	3	0	1	2023–2023
Last updated: 21 April 2024

=== Most career catches ===
Rank	Catches	Player	Matches	Innings	Period
1	41	Mohammad Rizwan	93	84	2015–2024
2	36	Sarfaraz Ahmed	61	61	2010–2021
3	28	Kamran Akmal	58	53	2006–2014
4	11	Umar Akmal	84	20	2010–2014
5	3	Rohail Nazir	3	3	2023–2023
Last Updated: 21 April 2024

=== Most career stumpings ===
Rank	Stumpings	Player	Matches	Innings	Period
1	32	Kamran Akmal	58	53	2006–2014
2	11	Mohammad Rizwan	93	84	2015–2024
3	10	Sarfaraz Ahmed	61	61	2010–2021
4	2	Umar Akmal	84	20	2010–2014
5	1	Mohammad Salman	1	1	2011-2011
5	1	Shakeel Ansar	2	2	2012-2012
5	1	Zulqarnain Haider	3	3	2007–2010
Last Updated: 21 April 2024

=== Most dismissals in an innings ===
Four wicket-keepers on four occasions have taken five dismissals in a single innings in a T20I.

The feat of taking 4 dismissals in an innings has been achieved by 19 wicket-keepers on 26 occasions with Kamran Akmal being the only Pakistani wicket-keeper.

Rank	Dismissals	Player	Opposition	Venue	Date
1	4	Kamran Akmal	Netherlands	Lord's, London, England	9 June 2009
2	3	Kamran Akmal	England	Bristol County Ground, Bristol, England	28 August 2006
2	3	Kamran Akmal	Kenya	Gymkhana Club Ground, Nairobi, Kenya	4 September 2007
2	3	Kamran Akmal	Zimbabwe	Maple Leaf North-West Ground, King City, Canada	12 October 2008
2	3	Kamran Akmal	New Zealand	Dubai International Cricket Stadium, Dubai, UAE	12 November 2009
2	3	Kamran Akmal	Australia	Darren Sammy National Cricket Stadium, Gros Islet, Saint Lucia	14 May 2010
2	3	Umar Akmal	New Zealand	Seddon Park, Hamilton, New Zealand	28 December 2010
2	3	Kamran Akmal	Bangladesh	Sher-e-Bangla National Cricket Stadium, Mirpur, Bangladesh	30 March 2014
2	3	Sarfaraz Ahmed †	England	Dubai International Cricket Stadium, Dubai, UAE	27 November 2015
2	3	Sarfaraz Ahmed †	Sri Lanka	Sheikh Zayed Cricket Stadium, Abu Dhabi, UAE	26 October 2017
2	3	Sarfaraz Ahmed †	New Zealand	Dubai International Cricket Stadium, Dubai, UAE	4 November 2018
2	3	Mohammad Rizwan †	South Africa	Centurion Park, Centurion, South Africa	16 April 2021
2	3	Mohammad Rizwan †	Bangladesh	Sher-e-Bangla National Cricket Stadium, Mirpur, Bangladesh	19 November 2021
2	3	Mohammad Rizwan †	Bangladesh	Sher-e-Bangla National Cricket Stadium, Mirpur, Bangladesh	20 November 2021
Last Updated: 16 December 2021

=== Most dismissals in a series ===
Netherlands wicket-keeper Scott Edwards holds the T20Is record for the most dismissals taken by a wicket-keeper in a series. He made 13 dismissals during the 2019 ICC World Twenty20 Qualifier. Pakistani record is held by Kamran Akmal when he made 9 dismissals during the 2010 ICC World Twenty20.

Rank	Dismissals	Player	Matches	Innings	Series
1	9	Kamran Akmal	6	6	2010 ICC World Twenty20
2	8	Kamran Akmal	7	7	2009 ICC World Twenty20
3	6	Kamran Akmal	4	4	2008 Quadrangular Twenty20 Series in Canada
3	6	Kamran Akmal	4	4	2014 ICC World Twenty20
3	6	Mohammad Rizwan	3	2	Pakistan in Bangladesh in 2021
Last Updated: 16 December 2021

== Fielding records ==
=== Most career catches ===
Caught is one of the nine methods a batsman can be dismissed in cricket. (Note: In 2017, The Laws of Cricket were amended, reducing the methods of dismissals from ten to nine, with handled the ball now covered as part of obstructing the field.) The majority of catches are caught in the slips, located behind the batsman, next to the wicket-keeper, on the off side of the field. Most slip fielders are top order batsmen.

Rank	Catches	Player	Innings	Period
1	50	Shoaib Malik	123	2006–2020
2	46	Babar Azam †	112	2016–2024
3	43	Fakhar Zaman†	81	2017–2024
4	39	Umar Akmal	64	2009–2019
5	31	Shadab Khan	95	2017–2024
Last Updated: 21 April 2024

=== Most catches in an innings ===
The feat of taking 4 catches in an innings has been achieved by 14 fielders on 14 occasions. No Pakistani fielder has achieved this feat. The most is three catches on nine occasions.

Rank	Dismissals	Player	Opposition	Venue	Date
1	3	Yasir Shah	Zimbabwe	Harare Sports Club, Harare, Zimbabwe	16 September 2011
1	3	Umar Akmal	England	Sharjah Cricket Association Stadium, Sharjah, UAE	30 November 2015
1	3	Shahid Afridi	New Zealand	Eden Park, Auckland, New Zealand	15 January 2016
1	3	Umar Akmal	West Indies	Dubai International Cricket Stadium, Dubai, UAE	24 September 2016
1	3	Hussain Talat	West Indies	National Stadium, Karachi, Pakistan	1 April 2018
1	3	Shoaib Malik	Australia	Dubai International Cricket Stadium, Dubai, UAE	28 October 2018
1	3	Shadab Khan	New Zealand	McLean Park, Napier, New Zealand	22 December 2020
1	3	Shaheen Afridi	England	Trent Bridge, Nottingham, England	16 July 2021
Last Updated: 16 July 2021

=== Most catches in a series ===
The 2019 ICC Men's T20 World Cup Qualifier, which saw Netherlands retain their title, saw the record set for the most catches taken by a non-wicket-keeper in a T20I series. Jersey's Ben Stevens and Namibia's JJ Smit took 10 catches in the series. Umar Akmal took 7 catches in the 2010 ICC World Twenty20 are the leading Pakistani fielder on this list.

Rank	Catches	Player	Matches	Innings	Series
1	7	Umar Akmal	6	6	2010 ICC World Twenty20
2	6	Younis Khan	7	7	2007 ICC World Twenty20
3	5	Mohammad Hafeez	6	6|	2007 ICC World Twenty20
3	5	Umar Akmal	3	3	Pakistan v England in United Arab Emirates in 2015-16
3	5	Fakhar Zaman	6	6	2021 ICC Men's T20 World Cup
Last Updated: 11 November 2021

== Other records ==
=== Most career matches ===
Rank	Matches	Player	Runs	Wkts	Period
1	127	Babar Azam†	4,192	-	2016–2024
2	123	Shoaib Malik	2,423	27	2006–2021
3	119	Mohammad Hafeez	2,423	27	2006–2021
4	105	Mohammad Rizwan	3,403	-	2015–2024
5	104	Shadab Khan†	679	107	2017–2024
Last Updated: 13 December 2024

=== Most matches as captain ===
Rank	Matches	Player	Won	Lost	Tied	NR	Win %	Period
1	85	Babar Azam	48	29	1	7	56.47	2019–2024
2	50	Salman Ali Agha	31	18	0	1	62.00	2024–2026
3	43	Shahid Afridi	19	23	1	0	44.18	2009–2016
4	37	Sarfaraz Ahmed	29	8	0	0	78.37	2016–2019
5	29	Mohammad Hafeez	17	11	1	0	58.62	2012–2014
Last Updated: 20 March 2026

=== Most man of the match awards ===
Rank	M.O.M	Player	Matches	Period
1	12	Mohammad Rizwan	102	2015–2024
2	11	Shahid Afridi	98	2006–2016
2	11	Shadab Khan†	104	2017–2024
2	11	Mohammad Hafeez	119	2006–2021
5	9	Babar Azam†	123	2016–2024
Last Updated: 13 November 2024

=== Most man of the series awards ===
Rank	M.O.S	Player	Matches	Period
1	4	Mohammad Rizwan	93	2015–2024
1	4	Babar Azam†	112	2016–2024
1	4	Mohammad Hafeez	119	2006–2021
4	3	Shahid Afridi	98	2006–2016
4	3	Shoaib Malik	123	2006–2021
Last Updated: 21 April 2024

=== Youngest players on Debut ===
The youngest player to play in a T20I match is Marian Gherasim at the age of 14 years and 16 days. Making his debut for Romania against the Bulgaria on 16 October 2020 in the first T20I of the 2020 Balkan Cup thus becoming the youngest to play in a men's T20I match.

Rank	Age	Player	Opposition	Venue	Date
1	17 years and 55 days	Mohammad Amir	England	The Oval, London, England	7 June 2009
2	17 years and 165 days	Ahmed Shehzad	Australia	Dubai International Cricket Stadium, Dubai, UAE	7 May 2009
3	17 years and 362 days	Shaheen Afridi	West Indies	National Stadium, Karachi, Pakistan	3 April 2018
4	18 years and 173 days	Shadab Khan	West Indies	Kensington Oval, Bridgetown, Barbados	26 March 2017
5	19 years and 30 days	Mohammad Hasnain	England	Sophia Gardens, Cardiff, Wales	5 May 2019
Last Updated: 9 August 2020

=== Oldest Players on Debut ===
The Turkish batsmen Osman Göker is the oldest player to make their debut a T20I match. Playing in the 2019 Continental Cup against Romania at Moara Vlasiei Cricket Ground, Moara Vlăsiei he was aged 59 years and 181 days.

Rank	Age	Player	Opposition	Venue	Date
1	39 years and 20 days	Rafatullah Mohmand	England	Dubai International Cricket Stadium, Dubai, UAE	26 November 2015
2	36 years and 178 days	Inzamam-ul-Haq	England	Bristol County Ground, Bristol, England	28 August 2006
3	34 years and 229 days	Zulfiqar Babar	West Indies	Arnos Vale Ground, Kingstown, St. Vincent	27 July 2013
4	33 years and 203 days	Shakeel Ansar	Sri Lanka	Mahinda Rajapaksa International Cricket Stadium, Hambantota, Sri Lanka	1 June 2012
5	33 years and 97 days	Misbah-ul-Haq	Bangladesh	Gymkhana Club Ground, Nairobi, Kenya	2 September 2007
Last Updated: 12 February 2021

=== Oldest Players ===
The Turkish batsmen Osman Göker is the oldest player to appear in a T20I match during the same above mentioned match.

Rank	Age	Player	Opposition	Venue	Date
1	41 years and 25 days	Mohammad Hafeez	Australia	Dubai International Cricket Stadium, Dubai, UAE	11 November 2021 ‡
2	39 years and 292 days	Shoaib Malik	Bangladesh	Sher-e-Bangla National Cricket Stadium, Mirpur, Bangladesh	20 November 2021
3	39 years and 24 days	Rafatullah Mohmand	England	Sharjah Cricket Association Stadium, Sharjah, UAE	30 November 2015
4	37 years and 275 days	Misbah-ul-Haq	England	Sheikh Zayed Cricket Stadium, Abu Dhabi, UAE	27 February 2012
5	37 years and 192 days	Saeed Ajmal	Bangladesh	Sher-e-Bangla National Cricket Stadium, Mirpur, Bangladesh	24 April 2015
Last Updated: 20 November 2021

== Partnership records ==
In cricket, two batsmen are always present at the crease batting together in a partnership. This partnership will continue until one of them is dismissed, retires or the innings comes to a close.

=== Highest partnerships by wicket ===
A wicket partnership describes the number of runs scored before each wicket falls. The first wicket partnership is between the opening batsmen and continues until the first wicket falls. The second wicket partnership then commences between the not out batsman and the number three batsman. This partnership continues until the second wicket falls. The third wicket partnership then commences between the not out batsman and the new batsman. This continues down to the tenth wicket partnership. When the tenth wicket has fallen, there is no batsman left to partner so the innings is closed.

Wicket	Runs	First batsman	Second batsman	Opposition	Venue	Date
1st Wicket	203*	Mohammad Rizwan	Babar Azam	England	National Stadium, Karachi, Pakistan	22 September 2022
2nd Wicket	143*	Ahmed Shehzad	Mohammad Hafeez	Zimbabwe	Harare Sports Club, Harare, Zimbabwe	24 August 2013
3rd Wicket	140	Mohammad Rizwan	Fakhar Zaman	Ireland	Castle Avenue, Dublin, Ireland	12 May 2024
4th Wicket	114*	Shoaib Malik	Umar Akmal	United Arab Emirates	Sher-e-Bangla National Cricket Stadium, Mirpur, Bangladesh	29 February 2016
5th Wicket	119*	Shoaib Malik	Misbah-ul-Haq	Australia	New Wanderers Stadium, Johannesburg, South Africa	18 September 2007
6th Wicket	91*	Fakhar Zaman	Mohammad Nawaz	United Arab Emirates	Sharjah Cricket Stadium, Sharjah, Australia	4 September 2025
7th Wicket	66	Sahibzada Farhan	Arafat Minhas	Sri Lanka	Rawalpindi Cricket Stadium, Rawalpindi, Pakistan	13 October 2026
8th Wicket	61	Iftikhar Ahmed	Faheem Ashraf	New Zealand	Gaddafi Stadium, Lahore, Pakistan	17 April 2023
9th Wicket	63	Saeed Ajmal	Sohail Tanvir	Sri Lanka	Dubai International Cricket Stadium, Dubai, UAE	13 December 2013
10th Wicket	40*	Haris Rauf	Sufiyan Muqeem	Afghanistan	Sharjah Cricket Stadium, Sharjah, UAE	2 September 2025
Last Updated: 14 April 2021

=== Highest partnerships by runs ===
The highest T20I partnership by runs for any wicket is held by the Afghan pairing of Hazratullah Zazai and Usman Ghani who put together an opening wicket partnership of 236 runs during the Ireland v Afghanistan series in India in 2019

Wicket	Runs	First batsman	Second batsman	Opposition	Venue	Date
1st Wicket	203*	Mohammad Rizwan	Babar Azam	England	National Stadium, Karachi, Pakistan	22 September 2022
1st Wicket	197	Mohammad Rizwan	Babar Azam	South Africa	SuperSport Park, Centurion, South Africa	14 April 2021
1st Wicket	176	Sahibzada Farhan	Fakhar Zaman	Sri Lanka	Pallekele Cricket Stadium, Pallekele, Sri Lanka	28 February 2026
1st Wicket	158	Mohammad Rizwan	Babar Azam	West Indies	National Stadium, Karachi, Pakistan	16 December 2021
1st Wicket	152*	Mohammad Rizwan	Babar Azam	India	Dubai International Cricket Stadium, Dubai, UAE	24 October 2021 ‡
Last Updated: 16 December 2021

=== Highest overall partnership runs by a pair ===
Rank	Runs	Innings	Players	Highest	Average	100/50	T20I career span
1	3,268	70	Babar Azam & Mohammad Rizwan	203*	48.05	10/15	2019–2024
2	1,116	41	Babar Azam & Fakhar Zaman †	91	27.21	0/6	2017–2024
3	912	25	Fakhar Zaman & Mohammad Rizwan	140	38.00	2/2	2019–2024
4	797	24	Shoaib Malik & Umar Akmal	114*	36.22	1/5	2009–2016
5	741	21	Ahmed Shehzad & Mohammad Hafeez	143*	37.05	1/3	2010–2016
An asterisk (*) signifies an unbroken partnership (i.e. neither of the batsmen was dismissed before either the end of the allotted overs or the required score being reached). Last updated: 20 June 2024

== Umpiring records ==
=== Most matches umpired ===
An umpire in cricket is a person who officiates the match according to the Laws of Cricket. Two umpires adjudicate the match on the field, whilst a third umpire has access to video replays, and a fourth umpire looks after the match balls and other duties. The records below are only for on-field umpires.

Rank	Matches	Umpire	Period
1	76	Ahsan Raza	2010–2024
2	72	Aleem Dar	2009–2024
3	37	Shozab Raza	2012–2021
4	30	Rashid Riaz	2018–2023
5	23	Asad Rauf	2007–2012
Last Updated: 21 April 2024

== See also ==
- List of Twenty20 International records
- List of Test cricket records
- List of Cricket World Cup records
