= Tim Southee =

New Zealand cricketer (born 1988)

Tim Southee ONZM
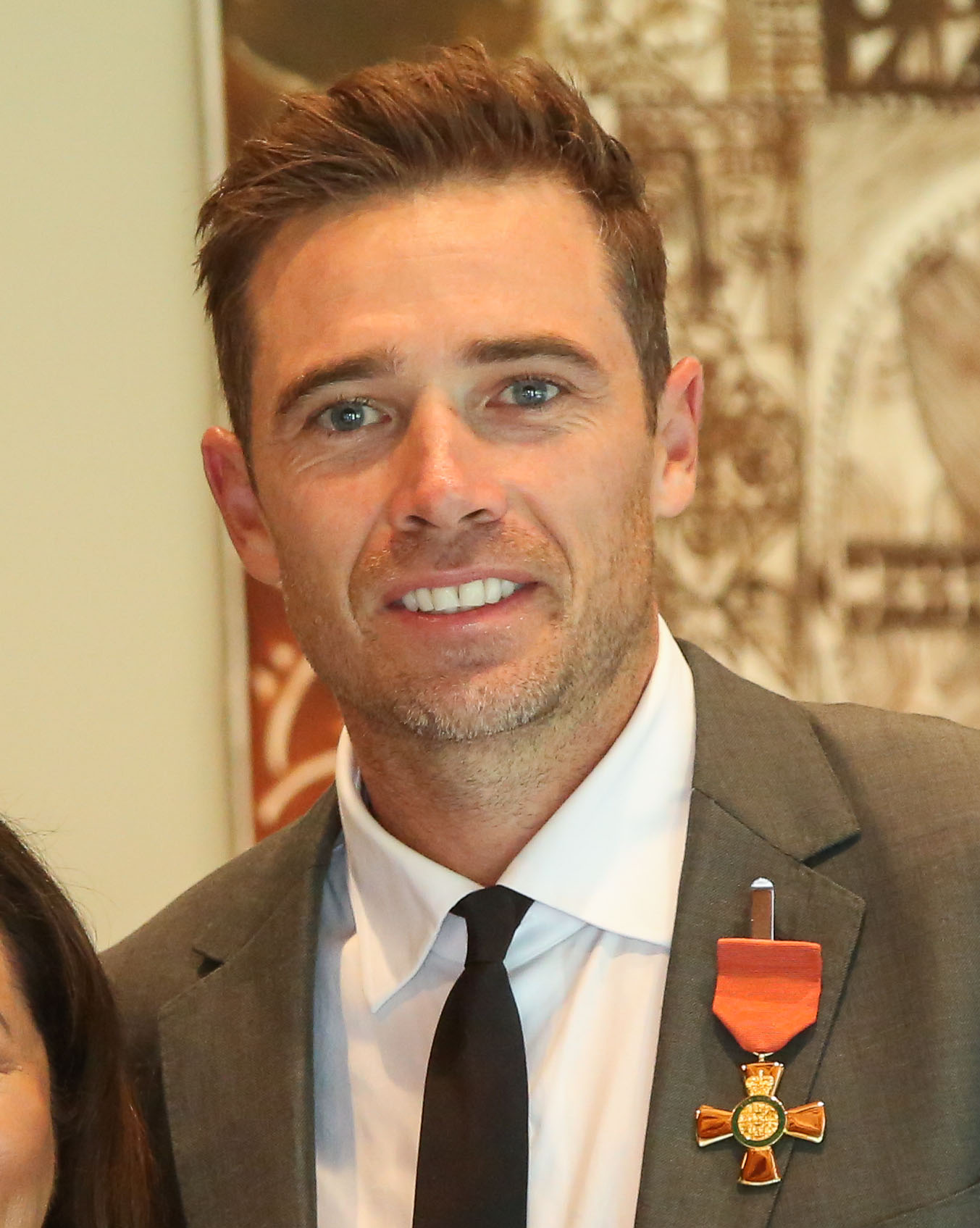
- Southee in 2025

Personal information
- Full name: Timothy Grant Southee
- Born: 11 December 1988 (age 37); Whangārei, New Zealand
- Height: 193 cm (6 ft 4 in)
- Batting: Right-handed
- Bowling: Right-arm medium-fast
- Role: Bowler

International information
- National side: New Zealand (2008–2024)
- Test debut (cap 237): 22 March 2008 v England
- Last Test: 14 December 2024 v England
- ODI debut (cap 149): 15 June 2008 v England
- Last ODI: 15 November 2023 v India
- ODI shirt no.: 38
- T20I debut (cap 30): 5 February 2008 v England
- Last T20I: 17 June 2024 v Papua New Guinea
- T20I shirt no.: 38

Domestic team information
- Years: Team
- 2006/07–2024/25: Northern Districts
- 2011: Chennai Super Kings
- 2011: Essex
- 2014–2015: Rajasthan Royals
- 2016–2017: Mumbai Indians
- 2017: Middlesex
- 2018–2019: Royal Challengers Bangalore
- 2021–2023: Kolkata Knight Riders
- 2023: London Spirit
- 2024–2025: Birmingham Phoenix

Career statistics
Competition	Test	ODI	T20I	FC
Matches	107	161	126	150
Runs scored	2,245	740	303	3,079
Batting average	15.48	12.13	11.22	16.03
100s/50s	0/6	0/1	0/0	1/9
Top score	77*	55	39	156
Balls bowled	23,490	8,075	2,753	31,110
Wickets	391	221	164	558
Bowling average	30.26	33.70	22.38	27.83
5 wickets in innings	15	3	2	26
10 wickets in match	1	0	0	1
Best bowling	7/64	7/33	5/18	8/27
Catches/stumpings	86/–	44/–	65/–	100/–
Medal record
Men's Cricket
Representing New Zealand
ICC Cricket World Cup
Runner-up	2015 Australia and New Zealand
Runner-up	2019 England and Wales
ICC World Test Championship
Winner	2019-2021
ICC T20 World Cup
Runner-up	2021 UAE and Oman
- Source: ESPNcricinfo, 19 November 2024

Timothy Grant Southee ONZM (born 11 December 1988) is a former New Zealand international cricketer who has captained New Zealand cricket team in all formats of the game. He is a right-arm medium-fast bowler and a hard-hitting lower order batsman. The third New Zealand bowler to take 300 Test wickets, he was one of the country's youngest cricketers, debuting at the age of 19 in February 2008. On his Test debut against England he took 5 wickets and made 77 off 40 balls in the second innings. He plays for Northern Districts in the Plunket Shield, Ford Trophy and Super Smash as well as Northland in the Hawke Cup. He was named as New Zealand's captain for the first T20I against West Indies in place of Kane Williamson, who was rested for that game. The Blackcaps won that match by 47 runs. Southee was a member of the New Zealand team that won the 2019–2021 ICC World Test Championship. Southee's Test batting strike rate of 82.68 is the third highest among batsmen with a minimum of 2000 career runs. He was also a part of the New Zealand squads to finish as runners-up in two Cricket World Cup finals in 2015 and 2019.

Southee is known for his ability to generate late outswing at a brisk pace, and later with off cutting slower balls almost like a faster off-spinner on a damp wicket and death bowling. He was the third-highest wicket-taker at the 2011 ICC World Cup (18 wickets at 17.33). He also impressed at the 2015 ICC World Cup, taking 7 wickets in a round robin league match against England. This performance was named Wisden's ODI spell of the decade. Southee announced his retirement from Test cricket in 2024, finishing with 98 sixes (equal fourth highest) and 391 wickets (third highest for New Zealand) in the format.

== Early and personal life ==
Southee was born in Whangārei, New Zealand, and grew up in Northland. He was educated at Whangārei Boys' High School and King's College, Auckland. While at school, he excelled at both cricket and rugby, playing representative rugby for the Auckland Secondary School and Northern Region teams.

Southee is married to Brya Fahy. The couple have two daughters.

== International youth representative ==
Southee played under-19 cricket for New Zealand from 2006 to 2009. His under-19 career included 13 one-day matches – 10 at ICC Under-19 World Cups – and a drawn three-match Youth Test series against India in early 2007. His last youth appearance was at the 2008 ICC Under-19 Cricket World Cup, where he was player of the tournament.

Southee was 17 years old when he debuted in the 2006 ICC Under-19 World Cup on 5 February, against Bangladesh in Colombo, Sri Lanka. He also played against Pakistan, Ireland, the United States and Nepal in that tournament. He ended with 5 wickets at an average of 38.8, and 113 runs at 22.6. New Zealand lost the Plate Final to Nepal.

In 2007, Southee played his only three Youth Tests when New Zealand hosted India. In the second match of the series, which New Zealand won, he took 6–36 and 6–56. He finished the drawn series with 20 wickets at an average of 18.2.

By the time Southee appeared at his second ICC Under-19 World Cup, in Malaysia in 2008, he had already played two full Twenty20 internationals for New Zealand. His bowling saw him named the player of the tournament. He took 5/11 in New Zealand's first match, against Zimbabwe, and went on to take 17 wickets in five matches, averaging only 6.64 and conceding only 2.52 runs an over. Only South Africa's Wayne Parnell took more wickets (18), although he played one more match. Southee's last under-19 appearance was New Zealand's semi-final loss to eventual champions India, a rain-affected match in which he took 4/29.

Within a month, Southee played in his debut test match. The youth squads he played in included other future internationals Kane Williamson, Martin Guptill, Trent Boult, Corey Anderson, Hamish Rutherford, and Hamish Bennett.

== International career ==
Southee began his international career as one of the youngest ever to feature for New Zealand. He has become a regular member of the international team in all three formats – Twenty20, one-day internationals, and test matches.

=== First Twenty20 matches for New Zealand ===
New Zealand's selectors and coaches took great interest in Southee while he was still playing youth cricket. In 2007 national bowling coach Dayle Hadlee took him to India. Hadlee later said that while there Dennis Lillee had compared Southee's talent to that of Glenn McGrath when he was young. Hadlee, brother of New Zealand Cricket Selection Manager Sir Richard Hadlee, also said that he'd been "whispering in Black Caps coach John Bracewell's ear about the possibility of taking Southee on the upcoming tour of England."

While in the selectors' eye Southee took 6/68 in the first innings of a first class match against Auckland in early December (the innings ended on his 19th birthday). Within a fortnight he was picked to play for a New Zealand XI team in a Twenty20 match against a Bangladesh team on 23 December 2007. The game, played at Northern Districts' home ground of Seddon Park in Hamilton, was a charity match for cyclone relief in Bangladesh, and not a full international. Southee bowled three overs and took 1/31.

On 30 January 2008, Southee was named in the New Zealand squad for two Twenty20 International games against England. Selection manager Sir Richard Hadlee said:

Why delay producing a player of some talent? Perhaps I could compare him with Brendon McCullum when he started – he had a lot of potential. It might take a lot of time for Tim to find his feet but why wait two or three years when someone is in a special category? The feedback we're getting is that this guy has got it.

Southee's international debut took place two years to the day after he had first played under-19 cricket for New Zealand, on 5 February 2008 in Auckland. He took 1/38. In the second match, Southee was New Zealand's best bowler with figures of 2/22 from four overs.

Most of the New Zealand squad stayed together for the first three one day matches that followed, but Southee rejoined the national Under-19 team for the 2008 Under-19 Cricket World Cup in Malaysia.

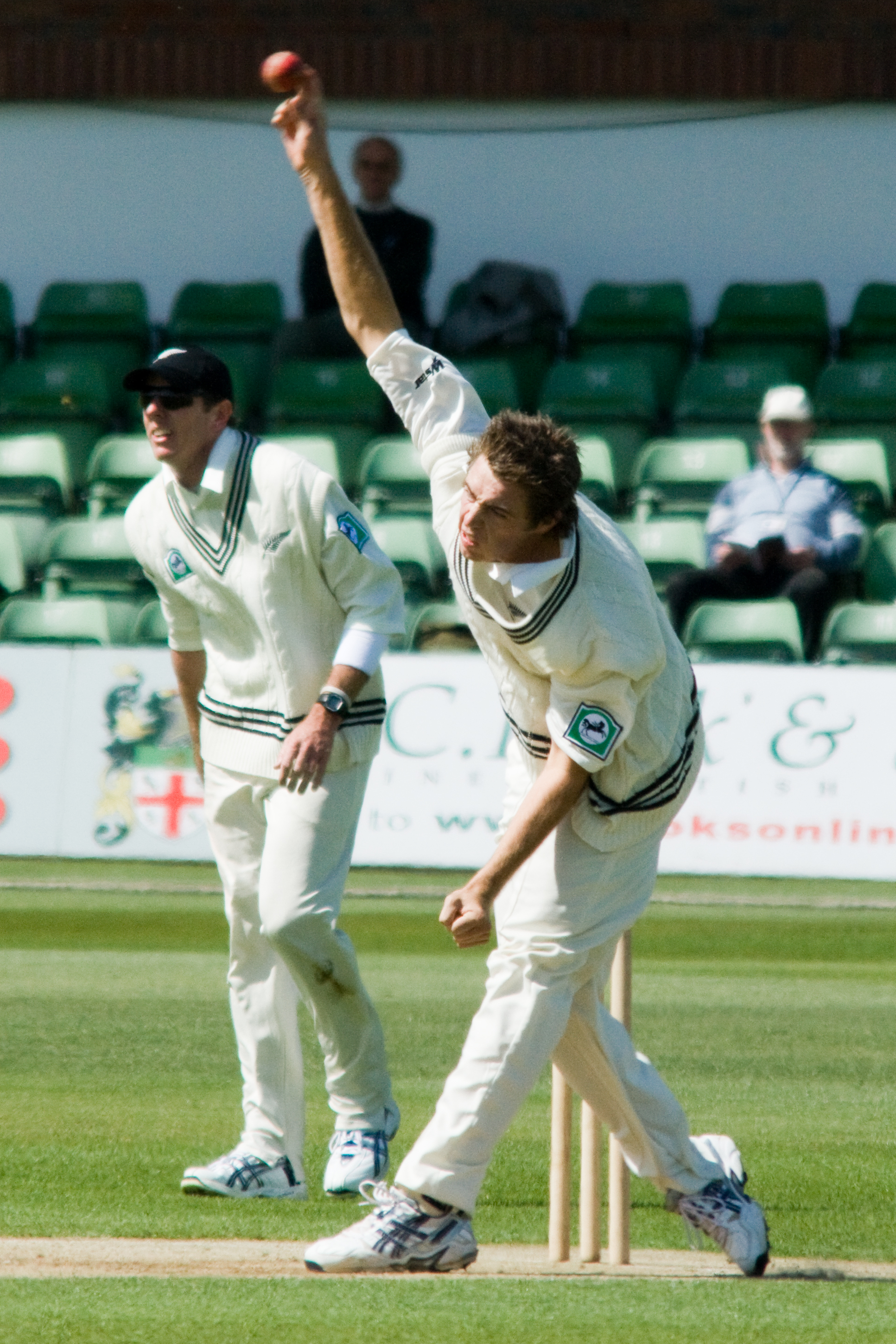
Southee bowling

=== Test match debut ===
England were still touring New Zealand when Southee returned home from the 2008 Under-19 World Cup as player of the tournament. The one-day series was over but the three-match test was about to begin. When injury ruled Kyle Mills out of the third Test match, in Napier, Southee was added to the squad and made his Test match debut on 22 March 2008. Aged only 19 years and 102 days, he was New Zealand's seventh-youngest test debutant.

He had an immediate impact in the first day, dismissing Michael Vaughan and Andrew Strauss in his second and third overs, and then later claiming the wicket of Kevin Pietersen. On the second day he took two more wickets and completed a debut five-wicket haul, finishing with 5–55. During New Zealand's second innings, chasing 553, Southee hit New Zealand's fastest half-century in 29 balls. His innings, which ended on 77* from just 40 balls, included nine sixes and four fours.

=== 2008 season (northern summer) ===
At the end of the 2007–08 season a survey of New Zealand's first class cricketers named Southee the country's most promising cricketer and in April he was awarded one of New Zealand Cricket's 20 player contracts, placing him among the players with "the greatest likely future value to the Black Caps in the next 12 months".

His rise was reflected in his selection for his first full international tour, to England, Ireland and Scotland from May to July. He played a single test match at Lord's, taking 0/59 in a drawn game, and seven one-day internationals (five against England and one each against the other two hosts). In the ODIs he took 16 wickets, averaging 16.93.

In October New Zealand visited Bangladesh to play three ODIs and two tests. Southee only played the ODIs, taking a combined two wickets for 114. Before the tests captain Daniel Vettori said that there was one position in the team for either Iain O'Brien or Southee. The position went to O'Brien.

=== 2008–09 New Zealand season ===
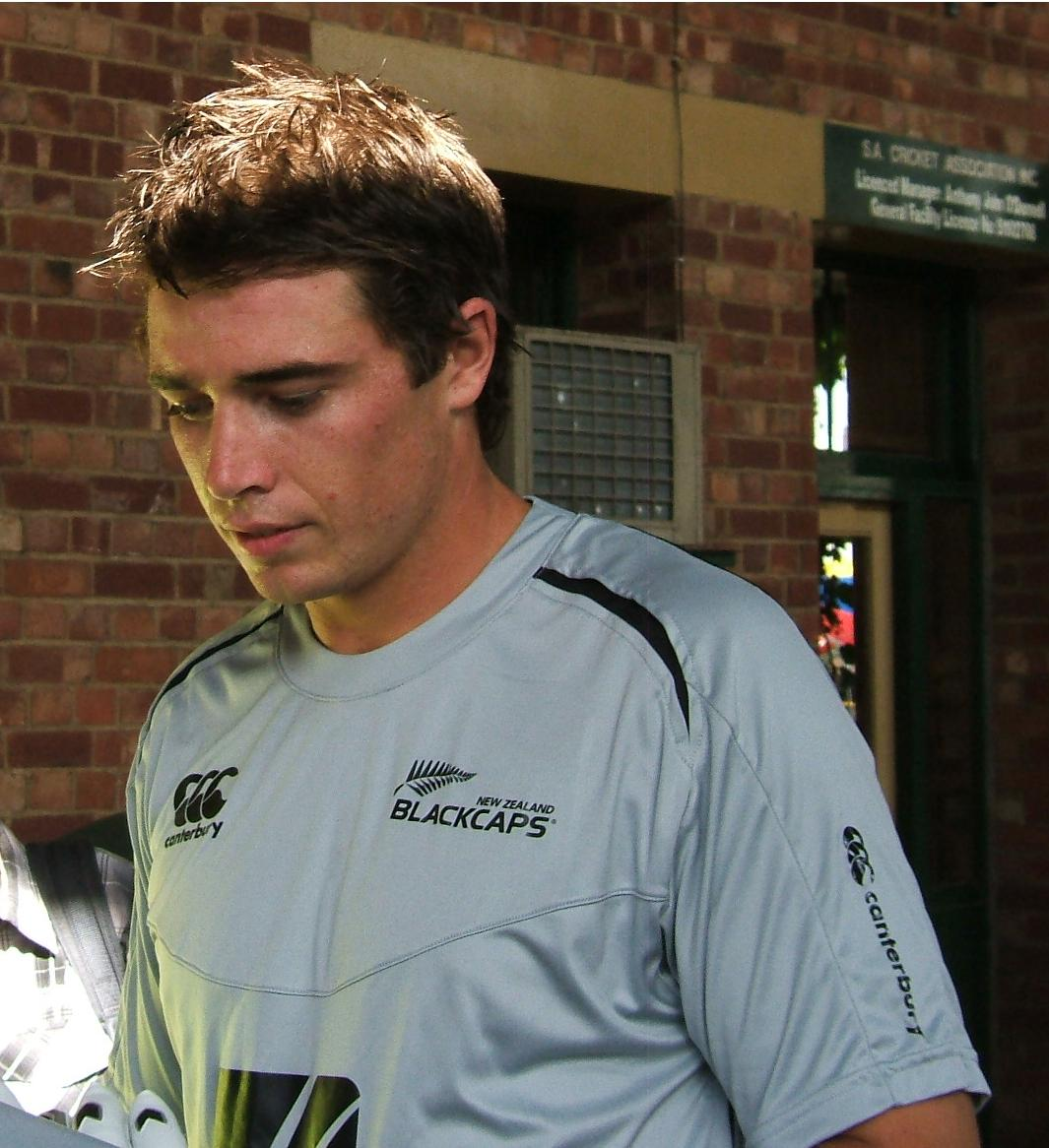
Southee at a training session in 2009

Through the 2008–09 summer Southee competed for a place in the New Zealand team with more experienced bowlers like Iain O'Brien and Ian Butler. Game-changing performances like the previous summer's five-wicket bags eluded him, though he played 19 matches for his country.

New Zealand's summer began with a short tour to Australia for two test matches. Southee took a combined 5/225 in those matches, going wicketless in the second. Australia won the series easily. Later in the summer New Zealand returned to Australia for five ODIs and a Twenty20 match.

The first inbound tourists of the summer were the West Indies, beginning with a test series for which Southee was dropped. He returned to Northern Districts for the first time since the previous season. The national team picked Southee again for two Twenty20s, across which he took 2/83, and five ODIs (5/180, with two matches being drawn due to rain).

In February 2009 New Zealand visited Australia for a five-match Chappell–Hadlee Trophy ODI series and a single Twenty20. Southee played all the one-day matches but only took three wickets, averaging 84.33. The series was drawn 2–2 and Australia retained the Chappell–Hadlee Trophy. The Twenty20 match, which was a 1-run win to Australia, saw Southee take 1/31.

New Zealand finished the summer hosting India for two Twenty20s, five ODIs and three tests. With Kyle Mills injured Southee played both Twenty20 matches, taking 1/42 and 1/36. New Zealand named a 12-man squad for the first three ODIs with Mills returning alongside Southee and fellow seam bowlers Iain O'Brien and Ian Butler. Initially, Southee and Butler were seen as competing for a starting spot. Butler played all three matches but Southee replaced Iain O'Brien in the third. He was hit for 105 runs without taking a wicket and then dropped from the squad.

Southee played only in the third of the tests, ahead of Mills and Jeetan Patel. India continued to dominate him, and his 30 overs across both innings cost 152 runs for only 3 wickets. The match was a draw, letting India win the series 1–0.

=== 2009 winter season – lower-level internationals ===
Southee retained one of New Zealand Cricket's 20 player contracts for the 12 months from 1 August 2009 but through the winter season was left out of Black Caps teams. Instead he played as a New Zealand emerging player, and for New Zealand A. His results were encouraging but Shane Bond's return to international cricket gave him another rival for international selection.

In late July and early August the Australian Institute of Sport hosted a four-team tournament including "emerging players" teams from New Zealand, India and South Africa. The tournament combined both Twenty20 matches (New Zealand played two) and one-day matches (six). Southee played all eight matches for New Zealand, finishing with 12 wickets – twice as many as any of his teammates – at 28.66. He scored runs quickly with 55 off 56 balls in the one-days matches. New Zealand won only one game.

Within a week of the tournament finishing in Australia, Southee arrived in Chennai, India to play four two-day games and a 50-over match with the New Zealand A team. Southee took only three wickets in the two-day matches (one in each of New Zealand's bowling innings, with one game ruined by rain). In the one-day match he took 3/37 off six overs.

=== 2009–2010 season ===
After missing the 2009 winter season Southee became a regular selection for New Zealand in the 2009–10 summer, playing 18 of the season's 22 international matches against Pakistan, Bangladesh and Australia. He also played ten HRV Cup matches for Northern Districts in January.

With bowler Daryl Tuffey unavailable due to a broken hand, Southee regained a place in the New Zealand team that travelled to Abu Dhabi and Dubai to play three ODIs and two Twenty20s against Pakistan. Before the series captain and stand-in coach Daniel Vettori said he hoped that Southee could "cement his place" in the team. Vettori picked him for all five matches, across which he took seven wickets (four in the ODIs, three in Twenty20s).

The teams moved to New Zealand for a three test series. Before the series Southee played for an invitational XI in a three-day match against the tourists but he "didn't think I bowled very well" and was omitted for the first two tests. He returned to Northern Districts and immediately took 8/27 in a Plunket Shield match against Wellington, the third-best figures in Northern Districts history. (The Wellington match was marred for Southee by a two-day suspension for swearing.) He was added to the New Zealand team for the third and final test, in Napier, opening the bowling and taking three wickets.

In February Bangladesh visited New Zealand for three ODIs, one Twenty20 and a test. Southee went wicketless in the Twenty20 and first ODI, then missed the second ODI. He returned with three wickets in the third. In the one-off test he opened the bowling and took four wickets across two innings. New Zealand won by 121 runs, giving them a clean sweep of the tour.

Australia's tour included two Twenty20s, five ODIs and two tests. Southee played all of these matches except the first Twenty20. His series began slowly, with only two wickets in his first five games. Although in the last ODI (which was a dead rubber) he took 4/36 and was man of the match in a 51-run victory.

Australia won the test series easily. In the first match New Zealand only took five wickets, none of them falling to Southee. In the second New Zealand started by bowling Australia out for 231. Southee had four first-innings wickets and added two more top-order scalps in the second. His two batting scores – 22 not out and 45 respectively – were his best since his debut test.

Building up to the 2011 World Cup, New Zealand's northern tours in 2010 focused on short forms of cricket. The team played five matches at the 2010 ICC World Twenty20 in the West Indies, a historic two-match Twenty20 series against Sri Lanka in the United States, four ODIs in a Tri-Series with Sri Lanka and India, a five-ODI series in Bangladesh, then five ODIs and three tests in India. The tour to India lasted until December.

Southee was a squad member for every series of the season, playing in 14 of these 24 matches.

Ten months after missing selection for the 2009 ICC World Twenty20 Southee played the first three of New Zealand's five games in the 2010 edition, taking a single wicket in each, but was dropped on form. New Zealand were knocked out at the "Super 8" stage.

New Zealand and Sri Lanka then played two matches at Central Broward Regional Park in Lauderhill, Florida. This was the first time full ICC members played each other in the United States. Across the two games Southee only bowled four overs, ending with a combined 0/25.

The three sub-continental countries that New Zealand toured to in 2010 were to host the ICC World Cup in March and April 2011. The tours were seen as important pre-cup practice but New Zealand lost every series. Southee took six wickets in seven ODIs (including four in one match), and four wickets in two tests.

In August New Zealand played a triangular one-day tournament hosted by Sri Lanka and including India. They played four matches, all in Dambulla, selecting Southee for the second (a loss to Sri Lanka) and fourth (a "comprehensive thrashing" against India), in which he took four wickets. New Zealand finished third.

It wasn't until October that New Zealand toured again, this time to Bangladesh for five ODIs in Dhaka. The tourists were "thoroughly outplayed throughout the series" and did not win a match. Southee played in two of the matches without taking a wicket.

The team to India played three tests (for the first time since March) and five ODIs. New Zealand did not win a game, though the first two tests were drawn. Southee missed the first test but replaced Jeetan Patel for the last two. He took four wickets at an average of 56. He played in three of the ODIs but didn't bowl in the last of them (India's chase only lasted 22 overs), and took a combined 1/97.

=== 2010–11 season: Pakistan in New Zealand ===
With the 2011 ICC World Cup starting in February, New Zealand only hosted one tour for the summer. Pakistan visited for three Twenty20s, two tests and six ODIs. Southee only missed one ODI, playing all the other matches. He became the third bowler (and second New Zealander) to take a hat-trick in a Twenty20 international, and also took his first ODI five-wicket bag.

The Twenty20 series began on Boxing Day in Auckland, where Southee was named man of the match. He finished the sixth over of the game with a wicket. In his next over he took a hat-trick – only the third in international Twenty20 cricket – giving him four top-order wickets in five balls. He ended with 5/18 in four overs – at the time his best figures in Twenty20 internationals. New Zealand won the match. Southee also took consecutive wickets in the second match, finishing with 2/26. In the third he took 1/53. His bowling average for the series was 12.1.

The first day of the first test saw Pakistan take seven wickets in 65 overs. Southee, batting at 8, played through to the end of the 90-over day with Kane Williamson in a partnership that "prevented Pakistan's complete domination", earning his second test half-century in the process. He was out the next morning for 56, making him joint top-scorer for the innings. Southee also took two first-innings wickets, but over the second and third days Pakistan easily won the match. Established as one of New Zealand's opening bowlers, Southee added two wickets in each innings of the second test. This gave his 6 for the series, averaging 40.5. He also scored another 23 runs in a drawn match. Both his batting and bowling averages for the series were better than his test career averages to date.

Southee played five of the six ODIs. One was washed out in the third over, effectively making it a five-match series. Pakistan won 3–2. In the first match Southee won another man of the match award for taking his first ODI five-wicket bag, including three in his opening spell. His 5/33 helped bowl Pakistan out for 134, leaving an easy chase for his team.

His figures faded through the series though, and in the last two matches he played (the fourth and sixth of the series) he didn't take any wickets. Across the series he took 7/217, averaging 31.

He was awarded the T20 Player of the Year by NZC for the 2010–11 season.

=== 2011 ICC Cricket World Cup ===
Southee was the third-highest wicket-taker at the 2011 World Cup, hosted by India, Sri Lanka and Bangladesh. He was named by the ICC as the 12th man, and only New Zealander, in the "team of the tournament" having finished with 18 wickets at 17.33 (Shahid Afridi and Zaheer Khan jointly topped the wicket-takers). He opened the bowling in seven of New Zealand's eight matches and was first change in the other. New Zealand used 12 bowlers in the tournament, with only Southee and Nathan McCullum bowling in all of their games.

Southee's best figures came in New Zealand's win against eventual semi-finalists Pakistan. He took 3/25, with each dismissed batsman playing in Pakistan's top five. He took wickets in all of New Zealand's matches, including three each against Kenya, Zimbabwe and Sri Lanka twice – in the group stages and in the first semi-final.

The New Zealand team employed former South African fast bowler Allan Donald as a bowling coach from January 2011. His work was credited as contributing a lot towards Southee's improvement and success at the world cup. Towards the end of the tournament Donald predicted that Southee could be the best swing bowler in world cricket:

The first thing I said to [Tim Southee] when I met him was, 'I want you to take the responsibility of leading this attack. As young as you are, I want you to take that responsibility because you could become the best swing bowler in world cricket in the next year or so' ... I haven't changed his style of bowling, although I think we can improve that. I think he can add the inswinger to right-handers and that's something I need to bring to his game to add some variety.

New Zealand ended the tournament as beaten semi-finalists. He was named as 12th man in the 'Team of the Tournament' for the 2011 World Cup by the ICC.

=== Twenty20s in India and England in 2011 ===
Southee had been passed over at the 2011 IPL player auction in January, but shortly after New Zealand were eliminated from the World Cup his form led to the Chennai Super Kings signing him for the IPL's 2011 season, which began on 8 April. The Super Kings coach Stephen Fleming's last test appearance for New Zealand had coincided with Southee's first. In his IPL debut Southee helped the Super Kings to a two-run victory over the Kolkata Knight Riders by conceding only 6 runs in the last over of the match. By playing the IPL Southee gave up the chance to join English county Essex for their domestic summer, but he did join them for the 2011 Friends Life t20 after the IPL. During a victory over Glamorgan, Southee took 6/16 including a hat-trick, establishing the record for best bowling figures for Essex in a t20.

On 26 August 2021, Southee was included in the Kolkata Knight Riders squad for the second phase of the 2021 Indian Premier League (IPL) in the United Arab Emirates.

=== 2011–12 season (southern summer) ===
New Zealand's season began with a short tour to Zimbabwe which included their first test match since January 2011, ten months before. Southee was injured out of that tour, with his knee not having recovered. Instead his season began with Northern Districts' first class matches, proving his fitness with a haul of 7–37 in the first innings against Wellington.

=== 2012 northern season ===
On the tour to West Indies there were 2 T20Is, 5 ODIs and 2 tests. On a difficult tour NZ won only 1 ODI, losing all the other internationals.

In the 5-match ODI series Southee was top New Zealand wicket-taker with 10.

Partnering Neil Wagner and Doug Bracewell, Trent Boult and Southee were called up for the 2nd test at Sabina Park and took 4 and 3 wickets respectively.

The schedule for New Zealand's tour to Sri Lanka included a Twenty20 match (abandoned due to rain), five ODIs (two abandoned, three rain-affected and won by Sri Lanka), and two test matches.

Southee played all three of the ODIs to count, taking only two wickets. In the fourth ODI he picked up three wickets before rain interrupted his over and ultimately led to the match being abandoned.

The test series was drawn one match all – including New Zealand's first win in Sri Lanka in over a decade – and Southee played a major part. He took 12 wickets at an average under 14. ESPNcricinfo rated him the best of the New Zealanders, saying that "on this series' evidence he can be an effective spearhead for New Zealand in the years to come."

=== 2012–13 season (southern summer) ===
By the start of the 2012–13 summer, national captain Brendon McCullum recognised Southee as "our number 1 bowler", an assessment that held even as New Zealand toured South Africa in December and January without Southee, who stayed behind for the birth of his first child and then injured his thumb in a domestic match.

On 14 February Southee returned to cricket after two months. Playing for Northern Districts in the Plunket Shield, he took 1 wickets and scored 3 runs. His form, and Mitchell McCleneghan being ruled out, led to a selection for the squad to play against the touring English team.

Southee returned to the New Zealand test team for the three match series against England. He took only one wicket in the first two matches, but in the third game at Eden Park Southee returned to form, taking 5 wickets as New Zealand fell one wicket short of a series win over the tourists.

=== 2013 season (northern summer) ===
In May 2013, New Zealand travelled to England to play two further test matches. Southee lead the New Zealand attack, bowling superbly to take a career best 10 wickets in the first test at Lord's (becoming the first New Zealander since Dion Nash to do so). He also bowled well in the second test at Headingley, and was widely regarded as unfortunate to finish with just 2 wickets.

=== 2014–15 and Cricket World Cup ===
In the first half of 2014, Southee continued to establish himself as one of the best new ball bowlers in the world, leading New Zealand to a test series victory over a touring Indian team with 11 wickets in a series of consistent performances. He followed this by once again leading the New Zealand bowlers in their tour of the West Indies. Southee again took 11 wickets as New Zealand won their first away series against major opposition in 12 years. By the end of the tour, Southee had risen to number 6 in the ICC world bowling rankings. For his performances in 2014, he was named in the World Test XI by ICC.

In the 2015 Cricket World Cup group match in Wellington, he took his career best bowling figures of 7/33 against England. The opponents were bowled out for 123 and the Black Caps won by 8 wickets with Southee being named Man of the Match.

=== 2016 onwards ===
Coming at no.10 against India at Dharamshala, Southee scored his first half century in ODIs. This was the fifth highest by any player in ODIs at no. 10 position. After getting dropped in the 1st test versus South Africa for Jeetan Patel he came on as a substitute fielder and caught Hashim Amla.

In May 2018, he was one of twenty players to be awarded a new contract for the 2018–19 season by New Zealand Cricket.

On 3 June 2018, he was selected to play for the Vancouver Knights in the players' draft for the inaugural edition of the Global T20 Canada tournament. In August 2019, in the series against Sri Lanka, Southee became the fourth bowler for New Zealand to take 250 wickets in Test cricket. In August 2019, Southee equaled the tally of sixes by the legend Sachin Tendulkar in test cricket with 69 sixes. On 29 December 2020, in the First Test of the series against Pakistan, Southee became the Third bowler for New Zealand to take 300 wickets in Test cricket.

Southee played his first match in the 2019 Cricket world cup against England on 3 July 2019 at the Riverside Ground. It was his only match played in the entire CWC 2019. In that match, he had bowled 9 overs (54 Balls) giving out 70 runs and taking 1 wicket at an economy of 7.78 in bowling. With the bat, he scored 7*(16) with no boundaries at the strike-rate of 43.75. In August 2021, Southee was named in New Zealand's squad for the 2021 ICC Men's T20 World Cup.

In November 2022, during India tour of New Zealand, Southee claimed his second hat-trick in T20Is and joined Sri Lankan bowling legend Lasith Malinga in an elite list of T20I bowlers who have taken more than one hat-trick in the shortest format of the game.

In February 2023, Tim Southee made history by becoming the first player from New Zealand to reach 700 international wickets. He achieved this unprecedented milestone during the 2nd Test of England's tour of New Zealand, 2023, when he dismissed Ben Duckett.

In May 2024, he was named in New Zealand's squad for the 2024 ICC Men's T20 World Cup tournament.

In November 2024, Southee announced his retirement from Test cricket at the end of the upcoming series against England. Southee played all 3 matches in the series, picking up 6 wickets to take him to 391 in Tests. His final tally is the second-highest for New Zealand in the format, behind Sir Richard Hadlee (431 wickets) and the eleventh-highest by any pace bowler.

In the 2025 King's Birthday Honours, Southee was appointed an Officer of the New Zealand Order of Merit, for services to cricket.

=== Captaincy ===
Southee was named stand-in T20I captain for the first T20I against West Indies. On 29 December 2017, he made his T20I captaincy debut. Under his captaincy, New Zealand won the match. Southee again captained New Zealand for first T20I against Pakistan as Kane Williamson was ruled out due to an injury. New Zealand won the match by 7 wickets.

Southee was named as the captain for the ODI series against England at home due to regular captain Kane Williamson was dropped from the squad due to injury. On 28 February against England, Southee made ODI captaincy debut for New Zealand In April 2019, he was named the vice-captain of New Zealand's squad for the 2019 Cricket World Cup. In August 2019, against Sri Lanka, he was named stand-in T20I captain for New Zealand as regular captain Kane Williamson was rested. In October 2019, Kane Williamson was ruled out of T20I series against England due to a hip injury, with Southee named as captain.

Southee was named the full time Blackcaps Test captain in December 2022 after the resignation of Kane Williamson from the role. In his first series as captain, he would lead New Zealand to a 0–0 draw against Pakistan. In New Zealand's first Test series at home following his appointment, the Blackcaps would split the honours with England in a two-Test series. On 28 February 2023, after defeat in the first Test, New Zealand won against England by a single run, having earlier been asked to follow-on. They became just the second team, after the West Indies, to win a Test match by this margin and the fourth team to win after following-on.

Southee stood down as New Zealand Test team captain in October 2024, after a 2–0 defeat against Sri Lanka at Galle.

=== Playing style ===
Southee is a right arm medium fast out-swing bowler and lower-order batsman. While not as quick as fellow new-ball bowler Trent Boult (and the fact that he does not keep bowling at 136–141 km/h for long spells in tests), Southee's meticulous accuracy and well disguised variations have allowed him to develop into a genuine spearhead. In 2008 when Southee was first selected in the national team Richard Hadlee remarked of him "He runs in relatively straight, he gets through his action nicely and he moves the ball, particularly away from the batsman". He also established himself as the new opening bowling attack partnership with Boult, having taken 46% of all wickets between them since 2013, especially since the retirement of Chris Martin. In seaming conditions or bowling with an older ball, he tends to bowl more cross-seam deliveries. In damp pitches, he tends to bowl off cutters akin to a fast off spin. In Tests, they have been ably complemented by Neil Wagner's short left-arm seam deliveries.

Despite not being considered a recognised batsman, Southee's aggressive lower order batting was often useful. He scored 7 Test half-centuries (with a highest of 77* from 40 balls on debut against England) and has a top score of 156 in First-Class cricket. His Test strike-rate of 82.68 is the third highest of all time (minimum 2000 career runs) and his 98 sixes (equal fourth highest of all time) came at an unmatched rate of one for every 27 balls faced.

== International cricket five-wicket hauls ==
Southee has taken 20 five-wicket hauls in international cricket. He took his first on his Test debut, against England at McLean Park, Napier in 2008, becoming the sixth New Zealander to take a five-wicket haul on Test debut, taking figures of 5/55 in the first innings. His best innings figures in Tests are 7/64, taken against India at Bangalore in 2012.

His best ODI figures are the 7/33 he took against England during the 2015 Cricket World Cup. His best figures in a T20I are 5/18, taken against Pakistan in 2010.

Five-wicket hauls in Test matches
No.	Date	Venue	Opponent	Inn	Overs	Runs	Wkts	Result
1	22 March 2008	McLean Park, Napier	England	1	23.1	55	5	Lost
2	31 August 2012	M. Chinnaswamy Stadium, Bengaluru	India	2	24	64	7	Lost
3	25 November 2012	Paikiasothy Saravanamuttu Stadium, Colombo	Sri Lanka	2	22	62	5	Won
4	16 May 2013	Lord's, London	England	3	19	50	6	Lost
5	25 November 2016	Seddon Park, Hamilton	Pakistan	2	21	80	6	Won
6	20 January 2017	Hagley Oval, Christchurch	Bangladesh	1	28.3	94	5	Won
7	30 March 2018	Hagley Oval, Christchurch	England	1	26	62	6	Drawn
8	15 December 2018	Basin Reserve, Wellington	Sri Lanka	1	27	68	6	Drawn
9	12 December 2019	Perth Stadium, Perth	Australia	3	21.1	69	5	Lost
10	21 February 2020	Basin Reserve, Wellington	India	3	21	61	5	Won
11	11 December 2020	Basin Reserve, Wellington	West Indies	2	17.4	32	5	Won
12	2 June 2021	Lord's, London	England	2	25.1	43	6	Drawn
13	25 November 2021	Green Park Stadium, Kanpur	India	1	27.4	69	5	Drawn
14	17 February 2022	Hagley Oval, Christchurch	South Africa	3	17.4	35	5	Won
15	9 March 2023	Hagley Oval, Christchurch	Sri Lanka	1	26.4	64	5	Won

Five-wicket hauls in One-Day Internationals
No.	Date	Venue	Opponent	Inn	Overs	Runs	Wkts	Result
1	22 January 2011	Wellington Regional Stadium, Wellington	Pakistan	1	9.3	33	5	Won
2	20 February 2015	Wellington Regional Stadium, Wellington	England	1	9	33	7	Won
3	20 February 2019	University Oval, Dunedin	Bangladesh	2	9.2	65	6	Won

Five-wicket hauls in T20Is
No.	Date	Venue	Opponent	Inn	Overs	Runs	Wkts	Result
1	26 December 2010	Eden Park, Auckland	Pakistan	1	4	18	5	Won
2	17 August 2023	Dubai International Cricket Stadium, Dubai	United Arab Emirates	1	4	25	5	Won

== See also ==
- List of New Zealand cricketers who have taken five-wicket hauls on Test debut
