= New Zealand cricket team against Sri Lanka in USA in 2010 =

New Zealand cricket team against Sri Lanka in USA
	New Zealand	Sri Lanka
- Dates: 22 May – 23 May
Captains	Daniel Vettori	Kumar Sangakkara

Twenty20 International series
- Results: 2-match series drawn 1–1
Most runs	Nathan McCullum (54)	Tillakaratne Dilshan (33)
Most wickets	Scott Styris (3)	Ajantha Mendis (4); Nuwan Kulasekara (4); Lasith Malinga (4)
- Player of the series: Daniel Vettori (NZ)

The New Zealand cricket team and the Sri Lanka cricket team toured the United States in May. This was the first time Full Members of the International Cricket Council met in an official match in the United States. All matches were played at Central Broward Regional Park in Lauderhill, Florida.

The tournament was scheduled to be of 3 Twenty20 Internationals between the teams but due to substandard lights in the stadium, the 1st match scheduled to be held on 20 May was cancelled as it was a Night game.

== Background ==
Both teams came straight from the 2010 ICC World Twenty20 in the West Indies to Florida.

== Squads ==
New Zealand
Batsmen All-rounders	Wicket-keepers Bowlers

Sri Lanka
Batsmen: Tillakaratne Dilshan; Mahela Jayawardene; Dinesh Chandimal; Chamara Kapugedera; Chinthaka Jayasinghe; All-rounders: Angelo Mathews; Sanath Jayasuriya	Wicket-keepers: Kumar Sangakkara (c); Bowlers: Muttiah Muralitharan; Thisara Perera; Nuwan Kulasekara; Ajantha Mendis; Lasith Malinga; Chanaka Welagedara; Suraj Randiv

== Twenty20 Series ==
=== 1st T20I ===
22 May
Scorecard

New Zealand; 120/7 (20 overs)	v	Sri Lanka; 92 (19.4 overs)
Ross Taylor 27 (30); Ajantha Mendis 2/18 (4 overs)		Angelo Mathews 27 (31); Scott Styris 3/10 (3 overs)

New Zealand won by 28 runs
Central Broward Regional Park, Lauderhill, Florida
Umpires: Marais Erasmus (SA) and Ian Gould (Eng)
Player of the match: Scott Styris (NZ)

- New Zealand won the toss and elected to bat

=== 2nd T20I ===
23 May
Scorecard

New Zealand; 81 (17.3 overs)	v	Sri Lanka; 86/3 (15.3 overs)
Nathan McCullum 36* (39); Nuwan Kulasekara 3/4 (3 overs)		Tillakaratne Dilshan 33* (49); Nathan McCullum 2/15 (4 overs)

Sri Lanka won by 7 wickets
Central Broward Regional Park, Lauderhill, Florida
Umpires: Marais Erasmus (SA) and Rod Tucker (Aus)
Player of the match: Nuwan Kulasekara (SRI)

- New Zealand won the toss and elected to bat

== Coverage ==
- Sky Sport – New Zealand
- Star Cricket – India
- ESPN – United Kingdom
- Supersport 2 – South Africa
- Caribbean Media Corporation – West Indies
- Star Cricket – Singapore
- Fox Sports – Australia
- Geo Super – Pakistan
- ESPN3 – USA

== See also ==
- United States v Canada (1844)
