= Pakistani cricket team in the West Indies in 2013 =

International cricket tour

Pakistan cricket team in the West indies in 2013
	West Indies	Pakistan
- Dates: 14 July 2013 – 28 July 2013
Captains	Dwayne Bravo	Misbah-ul-Haq

One Day International series
- Results: Pakistan won the 5-match series 3–1
Most runs	Marlon Samuels (243)	Misbah-ul-Haq (260)
Most wickets	Jason Holder (8)	Shahid Afridi (10)
- Player of the series: Misbah-ul-Haq (Pakistan)

Twenty20 International series
- Results: Pakistan won the 2-match series 2–0
Most runs	Kieron Pollard (72)	Umar Akmal (55)
Most wickets	Sunil Narine (4)	Zulfiqar Babar (5)
- Player of the series: Zulfiqar Babar (Pakistan)

The Pakistan cricket team toured the West Indies from 14 to 28 July 2013. The tour consisted of five One Day International and two Twenty20 International matches. The tour was initially to have included two Test matches, but the scheduling of a triangular series by the West Indies with India and Sri Lanka shortened the available window for the tour. The West Indies Cricket Board had asked the Pakistan Cricket Board to postpone the tour to August, but that interfered with Pakistan's plans to host India and complete a series against Zimbabwe that had been postponed from 2012.

In the first ODI game, Pakistan spinner Shahid Afridi finished with figures of 7/12, the second best ODI bowling figures of all time.

== Squads ==
ODIs		T20Is	
West Indies	Pakistan	West Indies	Pakistan
Dwayne Bravo; Tino Best; Darren Bravo; Johnson Charles; Chris Gayle; Jason Holder; Sunil Narine; Kieron Pollard; Kemar Roach; Darren Sammy; Marlon Samuels; Lendl Simmons; Devon Smith	Misbah-ul-Haq; Abdur Rehman; Ahmed Shehzad; Asad Ali; Asad Shafiq; Haris Sohail; Junaid Khan; Mohammad Hafeez; Mohammad Irfan; Mohammad Rizwan; Nasir Jamshed; Saeed Ajmal; Shahid Afridi; Umar Akmal; Umar Amin; Wahab Riaz		

== Tour matches ==
=== Guyana vs Pakistanis ===
11 July
9:30
Scorecard

Pakistanis; 246/9 (50 overs)	v	Guyana; 239 (43.4 overs)
Ahmed Shehzad 68 (79); Veerasammy Permaul 3/27 (10 overs)		Narsingh Deonarine 55 (70); Saeed Ajmal 5/37 (10 overs)

Pakistanis won by 7 runs
Bourda, Georgetown, Guyana
Umpires: Shannon Crawford (WI) and Imran Moakhan (WI)

- Guyana won the toss and elected to field.

== ODI series ==
=== 1st ODI ===
14 July
9:00
Scorecard

Pakistan; 224/9 (50 overs)	v	West Indies; 98 (41 overs)
Shahid Afridi 76 (55); Jason Holder 4/13 (10 overs)		Marlon Samuels 25 (75); Shahid Afridi 7/12 (9 overs)

Pakistan won by 126 runs
Providence Stadium, Providence, Guyana
Umpires: Paul Reiffel (Aus) and Joel Wilson (WI)
Player of the match: Shahid Afridi (Pak)

- West Indies won the toss and elected to field.
- Shahid Afridi broke numerous records in this match: his bowling figures (7/12) were the second best bowling figures in ODI cricket, His figures with bat and ball made him the only player in the history of cricket to take 5 wickets and score 50 runs against eight different teams, as well as the only player in the history of ODI cricket to take a 5-wicket haul and score 50 runs in the same match three times. He also became the first player in the history of cricket to score 7,000 runs and take 350 wickets. More than 4,500 of his runs (62% of his total score) came from boundaries, including a world record 311 sixes, and 659 fours.

=== 2nd ODI ===
16 July
9:00
Scorecard

West Indies; 232/8 (50 overs)	v	Pakistan; 195 (47.5 overs)
Darren Bravo 54 (81); Shahid Afridi 2/29 (10 overs)		Nasir Jamshed 54 (93); Sunil Narine 4/26 (10 overs)

West Indies won by 37 runs
Providence Stadium, Providence, Guyana
Umpires: Nigel Llong (Eng) and Peter Nero (WI)
Player of the match: Sunil Narine (WI)

- Pakistan won the toss and elected to field.

=== 3rd ODI ===
19 July
9:00
Scorecard

Pakistan; 229/6 (50 overs)	v	West Indies; 229/9 (50 overs)
Misbah-ul-Haq 75 (112); Jason Holder 2/40 (10 overs)		Lendl Simmons 75 (86); Saeed Ajmal 3/36 (10 overs)

Match tied
Beausejour Stadium, Gros Islet, St. Lucia
Umpires: Paul Reiffel (Aus) and Joel Wilson (WI)
Player of the match: Misbah-ul-Haq (Pak) and Lendl Simmons (WI)

- West Indies won the toss and elected to field.
- Haris Sohail (Pak) made his ODI debut.

=== 4th ODI ===
21 July
9:00
Scorecard

West Indies; 261/7 (49.0 overs)	v	Pakistan; 189/4 (30.0 overs)
Marlon Samuels 106 (104); Mohammad Irfan 2/60 (10 overs)		Mohammad Hafeez 59 (62); Kemar Roach 1/33 (6 overs)

Pakistan won by 6 wickets (D/L method)
Beausejour Stadium, Gros Islet, St. Lucia
Umpires: Steve Davis (Aus) and Peter Nero (WI)
Player of the match: Marlon Samuels (WI)

- Pakistan won the toss and elected to field
- Rain delayed the start of play and reduced each team's innings to 49 overs.
- Further rain reduced Pakistan's innings to 31 overs, with a revised target of 189

=== 5th ODI ===
24 July
9:00
Scorecard

West Indies; 242/7 (50 overs)	v	Pakistan; 243/6 (49.5 overs)
Dwayne Bravo 48 (27); Junaid Khan 3/48 (10 overs)		Ahmed Shehzad 64 (100); Tino Best 3/48 (10 overs)

Pakistan won by 4 wickets
Beausejour Stadium, Gros Islet, St. Lucia
Umpires: Paul Reiffel (Aus) and Joel Wilson (WI)
Player of the match: Misbah-ul-Haq (Pak)

- Pakistan won the toss and elected to field

== T20I series ==
=== 1st T20I ===
27 July
14:00
Scorecard

West Indies; 152/7 (20 overs)	v	Pakistan; 158/8 (20 overs)
Kieron Pollard 49* (36); Zulfiqar Babar 3/23 (4 overs)		Umar Amin 47 (34); Shannon Gabriel 3/44 (4 overs)

Pakistan won by 2 wickets
Arnos Vale Stadium, Kingstown, St. Vincent
Umpires: Gregory Brathwaite (WI) and Peter Nero (WI)
Player of the match: Shahid Afridi (Pakistan)

- West Indies won the toss and elected to bat.
- Umar Amin and Zulfiqar Babar (Pak) both made their T20I debuts.

=== 2nd T20I ===
28 July
14:00
Scorecard

Pakistan; 135/7 (20 overs)	v	West Indies; 124/9 (20 overs)
Umar Akmal 46* (36); Sunil Narine 3/26 (4 overs)		Dwayne Bravo 35 (44); Sohail Tanvir 2/20 (4 overs)

Pakistan won by 11 runs
Arnos Vale Stadium, Kingstown, St. Vincent
Umpires: Gregory Brathwaite (WI) and Joel Wilson (WI)
Player of the match: Umar Akmal (Pakistan)

- Pakistan won the toss and elected to bat.
- Asad Ali and Haris Sohail made their T20I debuts for Pakistan.

== Broadcasting Rights ==
TV Broadcaster(s)	Country	Notes
TEN Sports	Pakistan; West Indies; Sri Lanka	Official Broadcasters of the series.
TEN Cricket	Bangladesh; India	
PTV Sports	Pakistan	
Sky Sports	United Kingdom	
Super Sport	South Africa; Zimbabwe	
Fox Sports	Australia	
