= New Zealand cricket team against Pakistan in the UAE in 2009–10 =

Series of cricket matches

New Zealand cricket team against Pakistan in UAE in 2009-10
	New Zealand	Pakistan
- Dates: 3 November 2009 – 13 November 2009
Captains	DL Vettori (ODIs); BB McCullum (T20s)	Younis Khan (ODIs); Shahid Afridi (T20s)

One Day International series
- Results: New Zealand won the 3-match series 2–1
Most runs	BB McCullum 228	Khalid Latif 128
Most wickets	DL Vettori 5	Saeed Ajmal 6
- Player of the series: BB McCullum

Twenty20 International series
- Results: Pakistan won the 2-match series 2–0
Most runs	BB McCullum 66	Imran Nazir 77
Most wickets	IG Butler 3 TG Southee 3	Saeed Ajmal 3 Shahid Afridi 3
- Player of the series: Shahid Afridi

The New Zealand cricket team and the Pakistan cricket team played a three-match One Day International series and two Twenty20 Internationals from 3 November 2009 to 13 November 2009 in the UAE. The one-day matches were played in Sheikh Zayed Cricket Stadium, Abu Dhabi while the Twenty20s were played in Dubai Sports City Cricket Stadium. The series was originally scheduled to be held in Pakistan but due to security concerns, it was shifted to UAE although Pakistan still remained the home team.

== ODI series ==
=== 1st ODI ===
3 November
Scorecard

Pakistan; 287 (50 overs)	v	New Zealand; 149 (39.2 overs)
Shahid Afridi 70 (50); Daniel Vettori 2/34 (10 overs)		Aaron Redmond 52 (91); Saeed Ajmal 2/18 (7.2 overs)

Pakistan won by 138 runs
Sheikh Zayed Cricket Stadium, Abu Dhabi
Umpires: Asad Rauf (PAK) and Bruce Oxenford (AUS)
Player of the match: Shahid Afridi

=== 2nd ODI ===
6 November
Scorecard

New Zealand; 303/8 (50 overs)	v	Pakistan; 239 (47.2 overs)
Brendon McCullum 131(129); Shahid Afridi 2/49		Salman Butt 59(81); Scott Styris 3/23

New Zealand won by 64 runs
Sheikh Zayed Cricket Stadium, Abu Dhabi
Umpires: Bruce Oxenford (AUS) and Zameer Haider (PAK)
Player of the match: Brendon McCullum

=== 3rd ODI ===
9 November
Scorecard

New Zealand; 211 (46.3 overs)	v	Pakistan; 204 (49.1 overs)
Brendon McCullum 76 (78); Saeed Ajmal 4/33 (10 overs)		Mohammad Amir 73* (81); Jacob Oram 3/20 (9.1 overs)

New Zealand won by 7 runs
Sheikh Zayed Cricket Stadium, Abu Dhabi
Umpires: Nadeem Ghauri (PAK) and Bruce Oxenford (AUS)
Player of the match: Mohammad Amir

- Mohammad Amir's 73* is the highest score for a number 10 batsman in ODIs

== T20I Series ==
=== 1st T20I ===
12 November
Scorecard

Pakistan; 161/8 (20 overs)	v	New Zealand; 112 (18.3 overs)
Imran Nazir 58 (38); Tim Southee 3/28 (4 overs)		Bradley-John Watling 22 (36); Nathan McCullum 22 (21); Saeed Ajmal 2/18 (3 overs)

Pakistan won by 49 runs
Dubai Sports City Cricket Stadium, Dubai
Umpires: Nadeem Ghauri & Zaheer Haider (both PAK)
Player of the match: Imran Nazir

- BJ Watling (NZ) made his T20I debut.

=== 2nd T20I ===
13 November
(scorecard)

Pakistan; 153/5 (20 overs)	v	New Zealand; 146/5 (20 overs)
Umar Akmal 56 (49); Ian Butler 3/28 (4 overs)		Brendon McCullum 47 (41); Umar Gul 2/29 (4 overs)

Pakistan won by 7 runs
Dubai Sports City Cricket Stadium, Dubai
Umpires: Nadeem Ghauri and Zaheer Haider (both PAK)
Player of the match: Umar Akmal

== Media coverage ==
Television

- Ten Sports (live) – South Asia, Middle East and Pakistan
- Supersport (live) – South Africa
- Asian Television Network (live) – Canada
