= MCC Bicentenary Celebration match =

MCC Bicentenary Celebration match may refer to the following cricket matches:

- MCC Bicentenary match, 1987
- Bicentenary Celebration match, 2014
