= Bicentenary Celebration match =

Cricket match

Bicentenary Celebration Match
Rest of the World XI	Marylebone Cricket Club
293/7	296/3
50 overs	45.5 overs
- Date: 5 July 2014
- Venue: Lord's, London
- Player of the match: Aaron Finch (MCC)
- Umpires: Ian Gould (Eng); Richard Kettleborough (Eng)

The Bicentenary Celebration match was a 50-over exhibition cricket match played on 5 July 2014 at Lord's Cricket Ground, London, to mark the 200th anniversary of the ground, which was first used in 1814 and is considered the "home of cricket". The match was contested by the Marylebone Cricket Club (MCC), for whom Lord's is the home ground, and a Rest of the World team. The MCC team won the match by seven wickets, with Aaron Finch being named man of the match for his score of 181*.

An MCC Bicentenary match, celebrating the 200th anniversary of the MCC, was also played between MCC and the Rest of the World took place at Lord's in August 1987.

== Squads ==
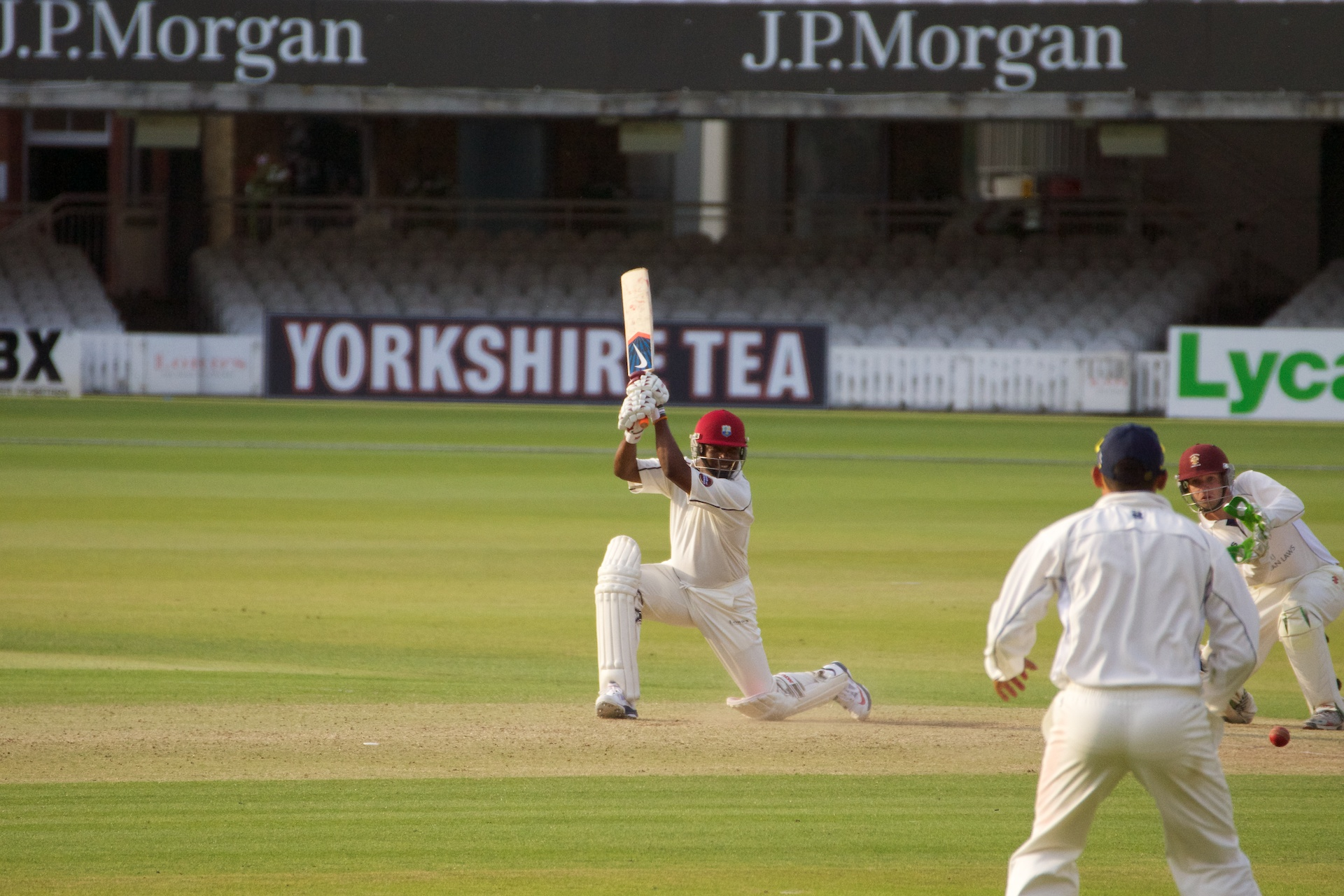
Brian Lara, batting for MCC, before the match, in a warm-up game against Hertfordshire.

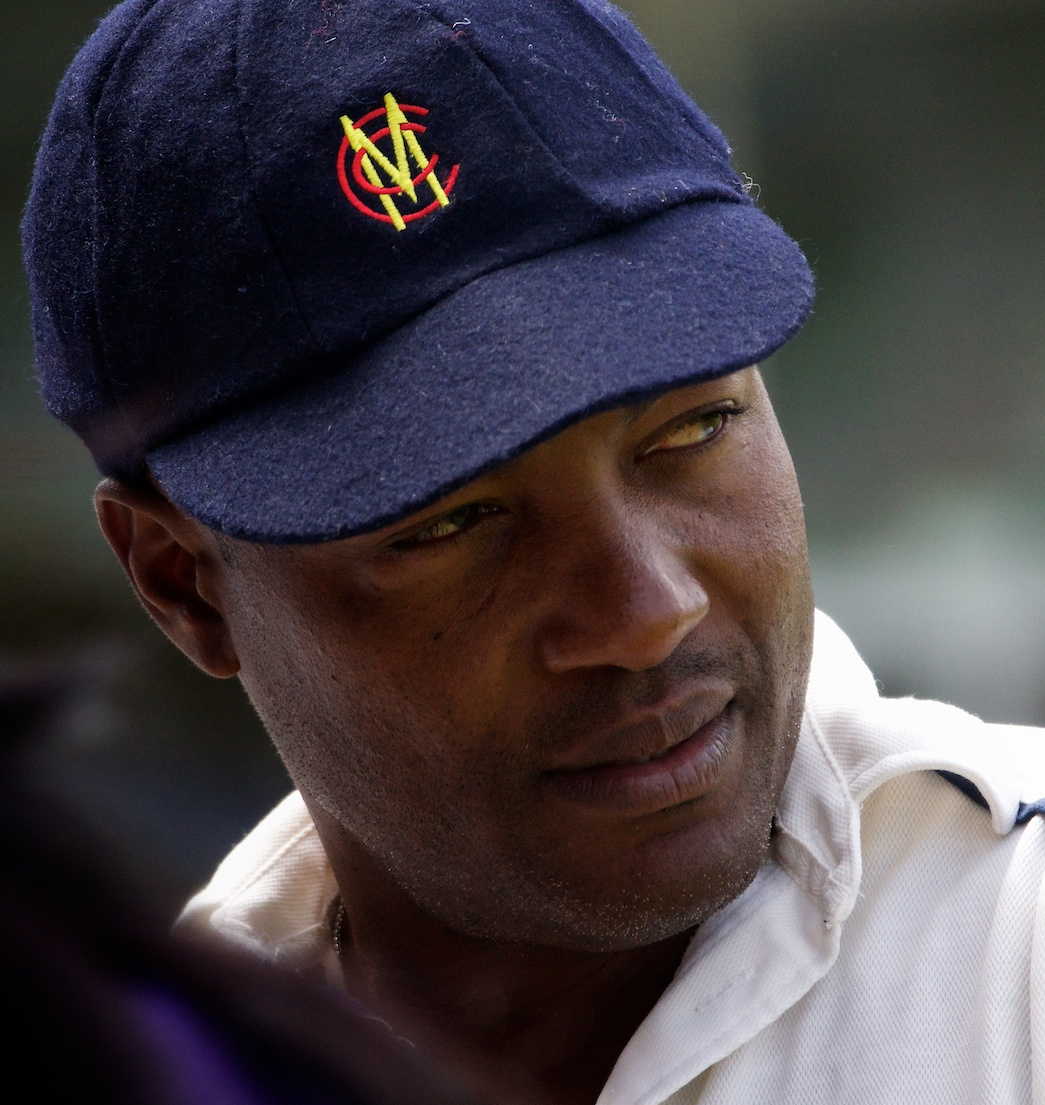
Close up of Brian Lara at the game

MCC	ROW
(India) Sachin Tendulkar (c); (Pakistan) Saeed Ajmal; (Cricket West Indies) Shivnarine Chanderpaul; (India) Rahul Dravid; (Australia) Aaron Finch; (Pakistan) Umar Gul; (Cricket West Indies) Brian Lara; (Australia) Brett Lee; (England) Chris Read; (Australia) Shaun Tait; (New Zealand) Daniel Vettori	(Australia) Shane Warne (c); (Pakistan) Shahid Afridi; (Cricket West Indies) Tino Best; (England) Paul Collingwood; (Australia) Adam Gilchrist; (Bangladesh) Tamim Iqbal; (Sri Lanka) Muttiah Muralitharan; (England) Kevin Pietersen; (India) Virender Sehwag; (Australia) Peter Siddle; (India) Yuvraj Singh; (South Africa) Shaun Pollock

== Match ==
=== Summary ===
Rest of the World captain Shane Warne won the toss and elected to bat. Adam Gilchrist and Virender Sehwag gave the ROW a quick start. The MCC's Pakistani bowler Umar Gul suffered a recurrence of a right knee injury, which meant he only bowled two overs before leaving the field. Pakistan spinner Saeed Ajmal was introduced during the power play and he struck immediately, removing Gilchrist, Kevin Pietersen, Tamim Iqbal and Shahid Afridi. However, this was then followed by a century stand between Yuvraj Singh and Paul Collingwood. Singh eventually scored a century as his late assault took the total to 293. Warne suffered a broken hand from the bowling of Brett Lee. Warne was replaced in the field by South African all-rounder Shaun Pollock. The MCC started well with both Sachin Tendulkar and Aaron Finch batting positively. Sri Lankan bowler Muttiah Muralitharan removed Tendulkar before Collingwood was able to dismiss Brian Lara and Rahul Dravid off consecutive deliveries. Finch along with Shivnarine Chanderpaul then took MCC home with Finch scoring 181 not out.

=== Details ===
5 July 2014
10:45
Scorecard

Rest of the World XI; 293/7 (50 overs)	v	Marylebone Cricket Club; 296/3 (45.5 overs)
Yuvraj Singh 132 (134); Saeed Ajmal 4/45 (10 overs)		Aaron Finch 181* (145); Paul Collingwood 2/25 (7 overs)

MCC won by 7 wickets
Lord's, London
Umpires: Ian Gould (Eng) and Richard Kettleborough (Eng)
Player of the match: Aaron Finch (MCC)

- Rest of the World XI won the toss and elected to bat

== Controversy ==
During commentary, former England cricketer Andrew Strauss described Kevin Pietersen as "a cunt" in what he believed to be an off-air conversation. While the comment did not go out on Sky Sports, it was broadcast to overseas viewers. Strauss later said "I apologise unreservedly, particularly to Kevin Pietersen. I am mortified and profusely sorry."
