= Tino Best =

West Indian cricketer

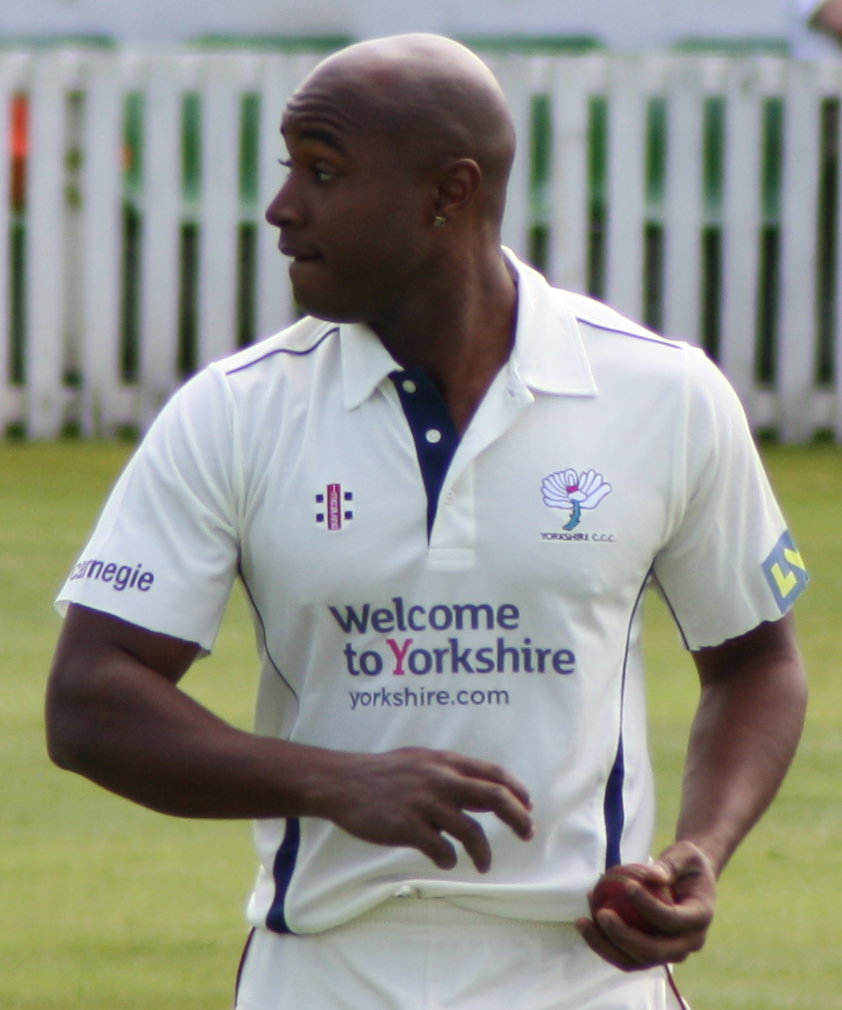

Personal information
- Full name: Tino la Bertram Best
- Born: 26 August 1981 (age 45); Saint Michael, Barbados
- Nickname: Animal, Bobski
- Height: 5 ft 8 in (1.73 m)
- Batting: Right-handed
- Bowling: Right-arm fast
- Role: Bowler
- Relatives: Carlisle Best (great-uncle)

International information
- National side: West Indies (2003–2014)
- Test debut (cap 251): 1 May 2003 v Australia
- Last Test: 19 December 2013 v New Zealand
- ODI debut (cap 123): 15 May 2004 v Bangladesh
- Last ODI: 4 January 2014 v New Zealand

Domestic team information
- Years: Team
- 2001/02–2015/16: Barbados
- 2010: Yorkshire
- 2013–2014: St Lucia Zouks
- 2016: Hampshire
- 2016: St Kitts & Nevis Patriots
- 2017: Barbados Tridents

Career statistics
| Competition | Test | ODI | FC | LA |
|---|---|---|---|---|
| Matches | 25 | 26 | 121 | 68 |
| Runs scored | 401 | 76 | 1,593 | 195 |
| Batting average | 12.53 | 9.50 | 12.06 | 10.83 |
| 100s/50s | 0/1 | 0/0 | 0/2 | 0/0 |
| Top score | 95 | 24 | 95 | 24 |
| Balls bowled | 3,716 | 1,300 | 15,609 | 2,902 |
| Wickets | 57 | 34 | 330 | 88 |
| Bowling average | 40.19 | 34.02 | 29.37 | 29.00 |
| 5 wickets in innings | 2 | 0 | 13 | 1 |
| 10 wickets in match | 0 | 0 | 2 | 0 |
| Best bowling | 6/40 | 4/35 | 7/33 | 5/24 |
| Catches/stumpings | 6/– | 4/– | 42/– | 15/– |
- Source: ESPNCricinfo

Tino la Bertram Best (born 26 August 1981) is a West Indian former cricketer. Since 2002, he has played domestic cricket for his native Barbados, with a season at English club Yorkshire in 2010. Best made his Test debut in May 2003 and played his first One Day International a year later. A back strain incurred in May 2004 prevented Best from playing cricket until March the following year. In 2008 Best signed to play in the Indian Cricket League because he had not played international cricket since 2006. He returned to the side when the West Indies fielded a side weakened by contract disputes between leading players and the West Indies Cricket Board but was dropped shortly after.

On his return to the Test side on 10 June 2012, he broke the record for highest score by a number 11 batsman, making 95 against England at Edgbaston. The 143-run partnership with Denesh Ramdin during that innings was also the third-highest Test stand with one wicket remaining. In 2013, Best's record was surpassed by Ashton Agar, who scored 98, also against England.

== Early career ==
Tino Best made his debut in first-class cricket on 25 January 2002, playing for Barbados against Guyana in the Busta Cup. He opened the bowling with Ian Bradshaw and in the first innings took four wickets for 50 runs (4/50), and Barbados won the match by 162 runs. Best finished his debut season with 17 wickets from 5 matches at an average of 24.29 with a single five-wicket haul.

== International breakthrough ==
At the time of his Test call up for the Test series against Australia, Best was Barbados' leading wicket-taker in the Carib Beer Cup for the 2002/03 season with 39 dismissals. Though Best was originally drafted in as cover for fast bowler Jermaine Lawson who had chicken pox, when Best made his debut in the third Test he opened the bowling with Lawson. The West Indies lost and Best bowled twenty overs without taking a wicket.

After an ineffective first Test, Best was overlooked for the West Indies' overseas tours and drifted out of contention with the emergence of fellow fast bowlers Fidel Edwards and Jerome Taylor. Back at domestic level, he fell out of favour and struggled to be selected for Barbados' Red Stripe Bowl side. While he was infrequently chosen for the one-day team, he improved on his previous season's wicket tally in the first-class competition and finished with 49 wickets including three five-wicket hauls, and was rewarded with a call up to the West Indies side to face England in March 2004. Best's first international wickets came in his second Test, the first in a four-match series against England; his maiden dismissal was that of batsman Graham Thorpe. England won the series 3–0 and Best finished as the West Indies' leading wicket-taker in the series (and third overall) with 12 from four matches at a cost of 25.08 runs each.

Between June and August 2004 the West Indies embarked on a return tour of England. Best played in the Lord's Test and was stumped off Ashley Giles' bowling after some banter from Andrew Flintoff wound him up sufficiently to try to slog the ball into the windows at Lord's. During the match Best suffered a back strain and was unable to take part in the rest of the series. It was hoped that the fast bowler would recover within a month, however the injury was more serious than initially hoped and he did not play cricket again until March 2005. In the Second Test against Pakistan in June 2005, after a wicketless first innings – where he had Kamran Akmal caught off a no-ball – and a second innings spell of 5-0-30-0, Best took four wickets in 11 balls, as Pakistan faltered from 223 for 4 to 309 all out. However, it was not enough to give West Indies the win.

Best was fined half his match fee in July 2005 for bowling three beamers during a Test against Sri Lanka. He was dropped from the Test side after the July 2005 tour of Sri Lanka. Tino appeared in the cricket movie Hit for Six playing a Barbados cricket player.

== International fringes ==
Despite successful performances for Barbados in domestic cricket by the time Best signed with the rebel Indian Cricket League in February 2008 he had not played international cricket since May 2006. Best played Twenty20 cricket for Mumbai Champs during his spell at ICL, he also played Twenty20 that season for Barbados.

In July 2009, there was a pay dispute between the West Indies players and the West Indies Cricket Board (WICB). As a result, an understrength squad was picked for the series against Bangladesh: of the 15 players named, which included Best, nine were uncapped. Sriram Veera of ESPNcricinfo noted of his performance on the second day of the first Test that "[Best] has, in the past, been guilty of trying to bowl faster than what he was capable of and being erratic as a result. Today, he repeatedly hit the short-of-length in the off-stump channel and slipped in the occasional bouncer." Those two wickets were his only scalps in the series and he ended up conceding 192 runs. The West Indies lost the series 2–0 as Bangladesh secured their first overseas series win. All the players who played for the West Indies during the contract dispute were given central contracts by the WICB, including Best.

Best signed a contract with Yorkshire County Cricket Club in April 2010 to represent them until the end of May. After some good performances, his contract was extended, but his form tailed off and he was demoted from opening the bowling, before being dropped from the team at the end of July. In nine first-class matches for the club, Best managed 18 wickets at a cost of 44.05 runs each. He was more successful in Yorkshire's one-day matches, taking ten wickets from five matches at an average of less than 20. In August 2010, Best's central contract was not renewed.

Best's domestic performance in the 2011/12 season, in which he took 17 first-class wickets at an average of 20.64, led to his recall to the international squad: in March 2012, Best was selected in the West Indies' ODI squad to face Australia at home. Though he did not play in the series, two months later when the West Indies toured England Best was drafted into the Test squad as cover for injured fast bowler Shannon Gabriel.

In July 2014, he played for the Rest of the World side in the Bicentenary Celebration match at Lord's.
