= Pakistani cricket team in the West Indies in 2005 =

International cricket tour

	Pakistan	West Indies
- Dates: 15 May 2005 – 6 June 2005
Captains	Inzamam-ul-Haq	Shivnarine Chanderpaul

Test series
- Result: 2-match series drawn 1–1
Most runs	Shahid Afridi 214	Brian Lara 331
Most wickets	Shabbir Ahmed 13	Corey Collymore 15
- Player of the series: Brian Lara (WI)

One Day International series
- Results: Pakistan won the 3-match series 3–0
Most runs	Mohammad Yousuf 101	Chris Gayle 189
Most wickets	Abdul Razzaq 8	Corey Collymore 6
- Player of the series: Shahid Afridi (Pak)

Pakistan toured West Indies for three ODIs and two Tests in May and June 2005. Pakistan got off to a great start in the warm-ups by beating the Antigua & Barbuda President's XI by 248 runs at Antigua and continued with a 59-run win in a low-scoring first match at St Vincent. The West Indian fans were to be disappointed again, though, as their team slumped to two successive losses in the ODIs at Gros Islet – losing the series 0–3, meaning that their home ODI record for 2005 read no wins, eight losses. They recuperated in the Tests, however, giving Pakistan eight and a half days of good cricket before imploding with the bat in the final innings to lose the second Test and thus having to settle with a drawn series, 1–1.

== Match details ==
=== Antigua & Barbuda Presidents XI v Pakistanis (15 May) ===
Pakistanis beat the President's XI by 248 runs

At the ARG, Pakistani all-rounder Shahid Afridi was the star as the visitors got off to a great start in their warm-up. A 46-ball century from Afridi and big partnerships with Salman Butt and Shoaib Malik built the foundation for a massive target of 366 for 7. The President's XI was then undone by the spin of Afridi and Malik, Wilden Cornwall the only one who offered some resistance with 46. Afridi, however, took four wickets for six Runs – including two no-balls and a wide – and was undoubtedly Man of the Match.

== ODI series ==
=== West Indies v Pakistan, 1st ODI (18 May) ===
18 May 2005
Scorecard

Pakistan; 192 (44.3 overs)	v	West Indies; 133 (45.2 overs)
Salman Butt 43 (63); CH Gayle 3/48 (10 overs)		DJ Bravo 27 (66); Abdul Razzaq 4/29 (9 overs)

Pakistan won by 59 runs
Arnos Vale Stadium, Kingstown, St Vincent
Umpires: EA Nicholls (WI) and DR Shepherd (ENG)
Player of the match: Abdul Razzaq (PAK)

- West Indies won the toss and decided to field.

West Indies had lost six straight One Day Internationals before this one, and were looking to avoid a seventh straight loss against Pakistan. Despite that, however, the selectors had chosen to rest Brian Lara, West Indies star batsman, for the ODI series, citing that he needed rests for the upcoming Test matches as a reason. However, the game started well for the Windies, Shivnarine Chanderpaul winning the toss and electing to bowl. Wickets fell with reasonable regularity, despite Daren Powell getting punished by Shahid Afridi and Salman Butt early on. Afridi was run out for a typical 24 off 21 balls – good co-operation between Corey Collymore and wicket-keeper Courtney Browne resulted in that, although it would never have been out if Afridi had not lost his bat in mid-run. The Pakistan team got runs off Powell, but never got the better of Ian Bradshaw, and his hard work and good swing bowling paid off as he got the wicket of Shoaib Malik for 13, who was deceived attempting a cut shot. The score was then slowly increased by the Pakistan team, who reached 108 for 3 after 25 overs – having lost Salman for 43 after a slice that was well taken by Xavier Marshall at point. But from then on, everything went down for Pakistan. Youhana ran himself out on 30 (133 for 4), and Chris Gayle got the big wickets of Inzamam-ul-Haq (23) and Younis Khan (9) to reduce Pakistan to 153 for 6. Only a ninth-wicket partnership between Abdul Razzaq (22) and Iftikhar Anjum (8*) gave Pakistan hope, as they were all out for 192 in 44.3 overs – a target that most saw as possible, even on an Arnos Vale Stadium ground where the average first-innings score is 207.

However, tight and intelligent bowling from Pakistan turned the match on its head. Xavier Marshall never looked comfortable at the crease, scoring three runs off sixteen balls before top-edging a short ball from Naved-ul-Hasan through to Pakistan's young wicket-keeper Kamran Akmal, who was to be one of the stars of the match. Naved-ul-Hasan got another victim with his short balls an over later, as Gayle mistimed it and edged it high to fine leg where Kamran dived thankfully – leaving West Indies at 26 for 2 with Ramnaresh Sarwan and Runako Morton trying to steady the ship. The West Indians were then frustrated by varied bowling from Pakistan, scoring six runs off the next seven overs, before Sarwan decided it was time to attack. He was probably out on 7, but the umpire declined the loud appeal, only for him to edge to slip two overs and two runs later. With the West Indies 44 for 3 after seventeen overs, it was time for captain Chanderpaul to try and save the innings. Instead, everyone fell around him – Runako Morton gone to Shahid Afridi's first delivery of the series, edging it to the keeper for 13, and persistent bowling on the off side paid off for Abdur Razzaq as he got Wavell Hinds to inside edge the ball through to the keeper for 11 – leaving West Indies at 76 for 5. In Razzaq's next over, Chanderpaul was dropped by Inzamam on the first ball, blocked the next three, then inside edged the fifth past his own stumps and into Kamran's waiting gloves. With the score 76 for 6, well behind Pakistan's at the time, it was only a question of whether they could survive 50 overs of this bowling. They could not – the last 20 overs were really just a display of pointless cricket. Dwayne Bravo offered some resistance with a gritty 27 that would not have been out of place in a Test match, but eventually was the last man to cave in to the pressure – attempting a big drive, he failed to connect well enough, and Shahid Afridi could catch the ball for Pakistan to win by 59 runs. Man of the Match was Abdul Razzaq, who turned the match with his four wickets and kept the pressure up on a pitch that became more and more difficult to read.

=== West Indies v Pakistan, 2nd ODI (21 May) ===
21 May 2005
Scorecard

Pakistan; 258/8 (50 overs)	v	West Indies; 218 (48.2 overs)
Shoaib Malik 51 (91); Inzamam-ul-Haq 51 (58); CD Collymore 3/40 (10 overs)		RS Morton 55 (98); Shahid Afridi 4/38 (10 overs)

Pakistan won by 40 runs
Beausejour Stadium, Gros Islet, St Lucia
Umpires: BR Doctrove (WI) and DB Hair (AUS)
Player of the match: Shoaib Malik (PAK)

- Pakistan won the toss and elected to bat.

A West Indies team in deep crisis were trying to avoid the series defeat at Gros Islet against Pakistan. The visitors won the toss and chose to bat on a grassy pitch, paying the price as Shahid Afridi mistimed a big cover drive (which had already given him runs from a six and a four so far in the day), off Daren Powell straight to Wavell Hinds, who took a grateful catch. A couple of overs later, Shoaib Malik attempted a quick single, but Powell was alert and grabbed the ball on his followthrough, pushing down the stumps at the wicketkeeper's end with relative ease and Salman Butt way out of the running to see him run out.

Shoaib Malik did struggle in this match, although he did get the runs eventually. Having run out his partner, he proceeded to struggle getting runs up – especially boundaries. Only a gift from Chris Gayle, who dropped a simple catch, ensured that he was still in and able to edge more runs. Yousuf Youhana from the other end, meanwhile, played a more calm and composed knock, before being controversially given out lbw by umpire Darrell Hair on 21 – some commentators argued that the sound heard was Youhana's bat hitting the pad, not the ball. However, a brisk knock from captain Inzamam-ul-Haq steadied the ship, and Shoaib Malik also found his footing eventually – before calling a too quick single, resulting in the second run out of the match and the fifth Pakistani run out of the series. With Shoaib gone for 51, Younis Khan joined Inzamam for a good partnership. It was abruptly shortened, though, when Inzamam got hit on the box by a straight full toss from Gayle, which could well have been lbw. As it was, Inzamam retired for 33, allowing a hard-hitting Abdul Razzaq to come to the crease. A blazing 20 followed before Corey Collymore reaped the rewards with his first ball of a return-spell – clean bowled. Inzamam thus returned to the crease with a runner – he chose Shoaib Malik, the man who had already caused two run outs earlier on in the morning. Three balls later, there could well have been a run-out, but the throw was off target and they saved the wicket. That turned out to be crucial, as Inzamam added a further sixteen runs to the Pakistan tally before slicing a drive off Gayle to backward point and a thankful Dwayne Bravo. Wicketkeeper Kamran Akmal then slashed a few boundaries to up the run rate, ending with 24 not out off 15 balls, but it was the fast bowler Corey Collymore who had the last laugh in the match – in the very final over, he dug out Younis Khan (caught well by Gayle for 48) and Naved-ul-Hasan (caught and bowled for 1) to finish with three wickets for 40, the best figures of the innings, while Pakistan set a very competitive target of 259, leaving the match hanging in the balance.

The Pakistan fielding effort started in jittery fashion, giving up three extras – two no-balls and a leg-bye – before letting an edge off Xavier Marshall run away for four. Then, Chris Gayle was suspected caught behind by all Pakistanis on 0, but the umpire turned down the appeal. Xavier Marshall was then out to a catch by Salman Butt for 6, and Ramnaresh Sarwan and Chris Gayle consolidated – not altogether willingly, as Naved-ul-Hasan served up some accurate swing bowling. Gayle, however, went back on the attack – which cost him dearly against Shabbir Ahmed. Playing across the line to an off-cutter, his off stump was exposed, and he was gone for 43.

With that, the West Indian innings imploded. Tight bowling frustrated Sarwan and the new batsman, Runako Morton, leading to Sarwan's run out – and when Morton finally found his footing, skipper Chanderpaul was run out for 3. After 25 overs, West Indies were 114 for 4 – with the relative inexperience of Runako Morton and Wavell Hinds at the crease. However, they were 13 ahead of Pakistan's score at the time. It was not to be, though – Shahid Afridi and Shoaib Malik frustrated them with spin, tying down the run rate, and eventually Afridi deceived the both of them – Morton with a slower ball that he attempted a big heave off, and Hinds with a clever googly. With Bravo looking clueless and gone for a duck, West Indies at one point needed 43 off 18 balls – a hopeless proposition. Shoaib Malik was Man of the Match, despite what many saw as being somewhat shaky at the crease for his 51 and not taking any wickets – some would have argued the case for Inzamam-ul-Haq, who made 51 as well, at a quicker rate, and was injured while batting.

=== West Indies v Pakistan, 3rd ODI (22 May) ===
22 May 2005
Scorecard

Pakistan; 303/6 (50 overs)	v	West Indies; 281 (49.3 overs)
Bazid Khan 66 (97); CD Collymore 2/51 (10 overs)		CH Gayle 124 (137); Abdul Razzaq 4/45 (6.3 overs)

Pakistan won by 22 runs
Beausejour Stadium, Gros Islet, St Lucia
Umpires: EA Nicholls (WI) and DR Shepherd (ENG)
Player of the match: Shahid Afridi (PAK)

- West Indies won the toss and elected to field.

Pakistan put in a second-string line-up in the third ODI, knowing that they had already won the series – opener Yasir Hameed came in for Salman Butt, Bazid Khan for a sore Inzamam-ul-Haq and off-spinner Arshad Khan for Iftikhar Anjum. Opener Xavier Marshall and fast bowler Daren Powell was dropped by the West Indies, young batsman Dwayne Smith and seam bowler Pedro Collins taking their places. However, the changes didn't matter much – Pakistan still won, although in a more relaxed fashion than the first two matches.

After early consolidation by Pakistan, with only the odd boundary from Shahid Afridi, the opener pair of Afridi and Yasir Hameed let the West Indies have it. Afridi lifted some massive drives over cover, leaving Pakistan 78 for 0 after ten overs. Yasir Hameed then added another couple of boundaries before hitting a single to leave Afridi on strike. A leg flick from Afridi two balls later saw him well caught by Dwayne Bravo off the bowling of Corey Collymore – out for 56 off 30 balls, but Pakistan were still 87 for 1 after 11 overs. The loss of the wicket stopped Pakistan somewhat, though, as Yasir Hameed didn't seem to have quite good enough control of the seam bowlers Collymore and Ian Bradshaw. They scored twenty off the next thirty-nine balls, Collins and Collymore tying them down enough before Hameed gave an edge that was caught by West Indian keeper Courtney Browne. However, Bazid Khan rebuilt with Yousuf Youhana, pairing up for 96 for the third wicket before Youhana was out caught off the medium pace of Wavell Hinds for 50. Younis Khan (40) and Abdul Razzaq (18) played quick knocks with many quick singles, and the cameo ended with Kamran Akmal, the young wicketkeeper, smacking three sixes off Ian Bradshaw to end with 24 not out off 9 balls. Bradshaw, despite taking two wickets and bowling a maiden over, conceded 78 runs from his ten overs, but all the West Indian bowlers were hit around as Pakistan notched up 303 for 6. Shoaib Malik – the usual number three – did not bat.

Slow accumulation was the word for the West Indian openers Chris Gayle and Wavell Hinds, as they were tied down by the Pakistani bowlers – as usual in this series. After ten overs, West Indies were 32 for 0, and needed nearly seven runs an over to win it. Chris Gayle realised the danger, and being gifted a no-ball by Naved-ul-Hasan, he slammed that over for 20 runs to bring the West Indians back on track. Things got more interesting when Wavell Hinds inside edged a pull shot off Abdur Razzaq to the Pakistani wicket-keeper, the score 90 for 1 after 16 overs. Two overs later, the new batsman Ramnaresh Sarwan tried to drive Abdur Razzaq over cover, but Younis Khan took an excellent catch, and many wondered whether the West Indies were about to see another collapse. However, captain Shivnarine Chanderpaul, struggling for form so far in the series, rebuilt well – and even bringing on Shahid Afridi, who had been devastating with the ball so far in the series, had little effect. At the end of 25 overs, the West Indies were 136 for 2, four ahead of the Pakistani score at the same time.

The West Indians didn't quite get the hang of the spinners, though, and eventually Shoaib Malik got Chanderpaul out caught for 33 – a solid innings from the captain, but he left the team in a struggling position. After that, the spinners tied the West Indians down, along with Gayle suffering from nervous nineties – although he did get his century, it was off 120 balls. With ten overs remaining, Runako Morton finally got his eye in – it was required, as the West Indians needed one hundred runs with seven wickets in hand. They did try – almost a bit too hard, because Morton was caught in the deep by Shabbir Ahmed off the bowling of Shoaib Malik for 27. The new batsman, Dwayne Smith, was gone in the next over, trying to hit across the line to Abdul Razzaq and judged lbw – ending with 0 off 3 balls, exactly what the hosts did not need. Razzaq got his third wicket with that ball, but gave away a few runs to Gayle and the new batsman Dwayne Bravo. Runs came to the new batsman Dwayne Bravo, but never enough to sustain the required rate of eleven per over, and trying to up the rate Chris Gayle launched another drive to cover fielder Younis Khan – out for a great 124, his eleventh one-day century. The new batsman, Courtney Browne, had smacked 39 off 27 balls in the last ODI, and continued in that vein today – smashing an expansive drive over extra cover for the West Indies' first six of the day, giving them some hope. However, with four overs remaining, there were still 43 runs to be hit. The pressure became too great for Dwayne Bravo, as he failed to read Naved-ul-Hasan's slower ball and was clean bowled for 16. That stopped the West Indies effectively, and their innings petered out to 281 all out as Browne (11), Collins (0), and Bradshaw (13) all became prey to the Pakistani bowlers.

Shahid Afridi was named Player of the Series.

== Test series ==
=== West Indies v Pakistan, 1st Test (26–29 May) ===
26–29 May 2005
(5-day match)
Scorecard

West Indies	v	Pakistan
345 (83.3 overs); BC Lara 130 (120); Abdul Razzaq 3/58 (17 overs)		144 (43.4 overs); Younis Khan 31 (59); FH Edwards 5/38 (14 overs)
371 (102 overs); S Chanderpaul 153* (254); Shahid Afridi 3/49 (17 overs)		296 (62.3 overs); Shahid Afridi 122 (95); CH Gayle 5/91 (18.3 overs)

West Indies won by 276 runs
Kensington Oval, Bridgetown, Barbados
Umpires: DB Hair (AUS) and DR Shepherd (ENG)
Player of the match: S Chanderpaul (WI)

- West Indies won the toss and elected to bat.
- The match was scheduled for five days but completed in four.
- Bazid Khan (PAK) made his Test debut.

A weakened Pakistan without Inzamam-ul-Haq (banned), Shoaib Malik (banned) and Yousuf Youhana (a sick father) went in with a bat-heavy team, with five pure batsmen and two all-rounders plus the wicketkeeper against a West Indies team who could field a first-choice eleven – only lacking all-rounder Dwayne Bravo. Nevertheless, Pakistan went in as favourites in most people's eyes, only to go down in spectacular fashion. The West Indians won the toss, and chose to bat first, nearly regretting it as they lost an out-of-form Chris Gayle early on as he was caught in close by Abdul Razzaq off Shabbir Ahmed. Three overs later, Devon Smith – West Indies' other opener – was let off by Test debutant Bazid Khan who fielded at second slip, as he could not react to a ball that came towards his stomach. However, Bazid Khan kept his nerve a bit later when he held an edge from the man at the other end, Ramnaresh Sarwan, who was outdone by an away-swinger from Shabbir Ahmed, reducing West Indies to 25 for 2. After a bit of a steady period, where Brian Lara in particular looked in control of the bowlers, another catch went to slip as Yasir Hameed could take the edge off Devon Smith's bat for 19. At lunch, however, Lara (44*) and Chanderpaul (14*) had restored some honour for the West Indies, lifting them to 102 for 3 on what looked like a fast outfield. The two continued after tea, Shabbir Ahmed sending down a particularly poor over with three no-balls, three boundaries and a run four, and Brian Lara eventually raced to a magnificent 130 off 120 balls, with 16 fours and four sixes before being bowled attempting a cover drive. Down the order, Wavell Hinds contributed with 28, wicketkeeper Courtney Browne made 12, and Daren Powell made 10, but Pakistan also served up 24 no-balls to help the West Indian cause. Two wickets with four balls – Powell and Chanderpaul (caught at cover for 92) marked the end of the West Indian fight-back, however, in what shaped up to be an excellent game of Test cricket. With King and Edwards both gone for 3, West Indies were all out for 345.

Shahid Afridi then started in the usual way, smacking a six over midwicket with his eighth ball, although Daren Powell bowled well and Fidel Edwards with considerable pace. However, nothing more specific happened, apart from Edwards notching up a 94 mph (151 km/h) delivery, and Pakistan went to stumps on day 1 with 22 for no loss, the match evenly balanced. The second day's cricket was moderately entertaining, though, especially for a crowd that had despaired over the West Indians' poor performance all summer. The 23-year-old Edwards bowled with reasonable accuracy, and although the Pakistanis helped him with some poorly chosen shots, which meant that wickets fell all too regularly. Shahid Afridi was first out, unsurprisingly, edging an outswinger to slip, and the embarrassment continued with no batsman reaching more than Younis Khan's 31. However, Younis's innings was marred by the way he got out. Coming out after lunch with the score 96 for 5, he attempted a pull shot off Edwards' bowling, but mistimed it and ended up with an easy edge to Corey Collymore at midwicket. In short, Pakistan never seemed to take in the dire situation they were actually in, and eventually were all out for 144 – trailing by 201, two short of the follow-on target. However, Shiv Chanderpaul decided to have another go at batting – owing in part to Fidel Edwards' injury and also to the fear of a big come-back, and he decided to send his openers in. It worked well against the new-ball bowlers Naved-ul-Hasan and Shabbir Ahmed, as the West Indies scored 59 for no loss in 16 overs, but Abdul Razzaq precipitated a mini-collapse when he got Devon Smith caught behind for 10. Two overs later, West Indies were 65 for 3, Ramnaresh Sarwan out for 1 and Chris Gayle gone for 50. It could, in fact, have been 65 for 4, had Chanderpaul not been lucky first ball – it was a poor inside-edge that landed between the off stump and the wicketkeeper. However, the West Indies recovered, with Lara making another good score of 48 before missing a drive and being stumped off Shahid Afridi. However, the West Indies were in control at the end of day 2, leading by 369 runs and with 6 wickets in hand.

The West Indies to push onwards on day three. Wavell Hinds, 28 not out overnight, batted well with captain Chanderpaul to add a further 103 runs before lunch – when Hinds was bowled by Kaneria. The new batsman, wicketkeeper Courtney Browne, only lasted three overs before edging to the young Pakistani keeper Kamran Akmal, who eventually held the catch for 1. Daren Powell, however, hung on with Chanderpaul for long enough that the captain could reach his century, his first against Pakistan and his fourteenth Test ton overall – making 5. Fidel Edwards then made a quickfire 20, Reon King 5 and Corey Collymore a duck, leaving Chanderpaul stranded on 153 not out – his second highest score in Test cricket. However, that was enough to lift the West Indies to 371 – setting Pakistan the highest target in the West Indies since 1930, and the highest in world cricket for 25 years, as they required 572 to win the game.

Pakistan, however, got the worst imaginable start. Three balls into the innings, Fidel Edwards served up a ball that Salman Butt felt he had to play at; he came down the ground, edged it, and a beautiful catch from Chris Gayle resulted in Pakistan being one down without scoring a run. Despite Edwards leaving the field an over later, West Indies put on the pressure, and Yasir Hameed and Younis Khan misunderstood each other to cause a run out. Then, Yasir Hameed gave a regulation outside edge to Courtney Browne, who said thank you and held the ball in his gloves as Pakistan were 16 for three after just over five overs – and with Asim Kamal (10 Tests) and Bazid Khan (debutant) at the crease. Luckily for Pakistan, rain intervened, but when the players came back, Corey Collymore bowled a beautiful inswinger that hit Bazid Khan sharply on the pads, and the umpire easily gave him out. 47 for 4, and despite Asim Kamal and Shahid Afridi giving them quick runs – aided by the West Indians giving up a few no-balls – they got to stumps without losing a further wicket, with the score up to 113 for 4.

The fourth day was dominated by one man – Shahid Afridi. With the West Indies lacking the sting of Fidel Edwards' pace, their bowlers were smacked to all corners by the violent Afridi, who brought up his third Test century off 78 balls – the second fastest in this century – and despite Asim Kamal going for 55 off the bowling of Gayle, there were genuine, if misguided, hopes that Pakistan would win the match. However, those hopes were dashed when Afridi lofted a massive drive straight to captain Chanderpaul – meaning that Pakistan would still need 299 runs for the last four wickets. There was never any threat, and when Abdul Razzaq went for 41 – stumped off the bowling of Chris Gayle after a call that went to the TV umpire – three overs after lunch, the question became how big the win would become. With Chris Gayle removing both Kamran Akmal (bowled for 21) and Danish Kaneria (caught behind for 0) within the space of three balls, West Indies ended up with a surprising 276-run victory.

=== West Indies v Pakistan, 2nd Test (3–7 June) ===
3–7 June 2005
(5-day match)
Scorecard

Pakistan	v	West Indies
374 (100.3 overs); Younis Khan 106 (190); CD Collymore 7/78 (27.3 overs)		404 (112 overs); BC Lara 153 (233); Shabbir Ahmed 4/64 (22 overs)
309 (77.5 overs); Inzamam-ul-Haq 117* (194); TL Best 4/46 (13 overs)		143 (52.5 overs); DS Smith 49 (109); Danish Kaneria 5/46 (20 overs)

Pakistan won by 136 runs
Sabina Park, Kingston, Jamaica
Umpires: DB Hair (AUS) and DR Shepherd (ENG)
Player of the match: Danish Kaneria (PAK)

- Pakistan won the toss and elected to bat.

The second Test between Pakistan and West Indies, at Kingston in Jamaica, was much more closely contested, but the return of Inzamam-ul-Haq and second-innings ducks for Brian Lara and Shivnarine Chanderpaul decided the match – and squared the Test series. Pakistan was strengthened by the return of Inzamam-ul-Haq, who came in for Bazid Khan, and also exchanged Shoaib Malik for Salman Butt, while West Indies lacked an injured Fidel Edwards – top wicket taker for the West Indies in the last game – who was replaced by fellow fast bowler Tino Best. Best made his debut in the series, a rather uninspiring one, although he did take four wickets in a frantic spell on the morning of the fourth day.

The visitors won the toss, and batted first, losing Yasir Hameed as he gave a regulation edge to first slip Gayle off the bowling of Powell. Fellow opener Shoaib Malik lasted for much longer, pairing up with Younis Khan for 27, but looked uncertain at the crease and it was no surprise when he departed for 13. Some inconsistent bowling, particularly from Reon King, and fielding lapses gave Pakistan's star batsmen Younis and Inzamam the edge, however, as they smashed 97 runs in twenty overs with Inzamam doing the brunt of the damage with a 60-ball fifty. A straight ball from Chris Gayle undid him, however, but Asim Kamal continued the work that Younis and Inzamam had started as they fluently and easily brought up 200. Younis eventually got a century, finishing on 106, but Collymore was the pick of the afternoon session – he took three wickets, those of Younis, Asim Kamal and Shahid Afridi, as he had a real workhorse's afternoon and bowled tempting balls that beat the outside edge of the bat numerous times. It could have been even better for the West Indies, had not Tino Best been no-balled when he had Kamran Akmal caught behind, but the first day gave Pakistan the edge as they made 336 for 6.

Six balls into the morning session, Abdul Razzaq was lbw to Corey Collymore, and the West Indians in the crowd hoped for a quick finish. Far from it, as Kamran Akmal and Naved-ul-Hasan added 19 before Naved-ul-Hasan was forced to retire with a smashed hand. That gave the West Indies some hope, as they wrapped up the innings ten overs into the morning session, but those 38 runs conceded could have proven costly. The West Indian reply was anything but cautious, as Chris Gayle started the innings with smashing three fours off the injured Naved-ul-Hasan, who bowled six overs for fifty runs on the day – he was taken off after two overs for 22 with the new ball, then bowled another spell of four overs for 28. They raced to 48 for 0 before Gayle was tricked by an away-swinger from Abdul Razzaq, giving an outside edge to Kamran Akmal. Devon Smith and Ramnaresh Sarwan slowed down, scoring only 11 before Devon Smith was out to a grubber from Abdul Razzaq, so the innings was finely poised at 59 for 2. The new batsman Brian Lara used the time to get his eye in, knowing that the game had gone along a bit too quickly.

However, after lunch it was time to open things. Lara smashed runs at a run-a-ball, as the score went from 100 to 200 with 142 Pakistani deliveries, and although Pakistan wrested back some of the initiative with the wicket of Sarwan for 55, it was the West Indians' day. Shiv Chanderpaul hung on with Lara for the fourth wicket, as the pair added 70 in 23.4 overs – but a googly from Danish Kaneria resulted in a thin edge from Chanderpaul, who was out for 28. Thus, the West Indies went to stumps with 275 for 4, Lara unbeaten on 125. The West Indians continued on day 3, wishing to get up a big lead in fairly short time, and getting punished by Shabbir Ahmed – who ripped out Lara (for 153), Courtney Browne (for 0) and Daren Powell (for 14) – all caught behind. Wavell Hinds' fine 63, however, lifted the West Indians to 404 and a lead of 30, but Pakistan had done well to come back from 326 for 4. After the innings break, Pakistan started well, accumulating runs against unthreatening bowling from Powell and Best, but the untiring Collymore came back and had Yasir Hameed caught at slip for 26, although admittedly not with the best of deliveries. Shoaib Malik and Younis Khan continued, however, Malik notching up 64 runs before giving an inside edge off Collymore to Browne, and Collymore was also responsible for the third wicket, Asim Kamal missing a straight one for 0. Then, Courtney Browne dropped Inzamam early on – a mistake that would prove costly, as he went on to make 104 not out, in good partnerships with Younis Khan and Shahid Afridi, as Pakistan moved to 223 for 4 at stumps and wrested control of the game.

Afridi and Inzamam added a further 44 runs for the fifth wicket before Pakistan decided to implode. Tino Best, returning after an opening spell of 5–0–30–0, got Shahid Afridi with his first delivery of the day, edging to Dwayne Smith. In his next over, he served up a beautiful inswinger that had Abdul Razzaq beaten completely, and the ball trickled onto his stumps. And before anyone noticed what had happened, Pakistan had lost five wickets for 28 runs, and Best had figures of 6–1–9–4 in his spell. Inzamam and Danish Kaneria saw it through to lunch, but shortly afterwards, Collymore served up a short ball to the tail-ender Kaneria, who supplied with an edge through to a diving Chris Gayle. Pakistan were all out for 309, setting the West Indies a target of 280 in five sessions – meaning that the match would definitely give a result.

On a pitch that slowly deteriorated, the chase would be interesting, and it became even more interesting when Chris Gayle edged a short-ball from Shabbir Ahmed to Yasir Hameed at slips, resulting in 27 for 1. Sarwan and Devon Smith recuperated, taking the chase to 38 for 1, before clouds shaded the light from the sun and the batsmen had to go off for poor light. Coming back after a two-hour break, Devon Smith immediately started to hit runs, but Sarwan looked more uncertain as he was possibly caught behind off Kaneria. Three balls later, he became the first West Indies batsman out hit wicket in over two years since Carlton Baugh managed it against Australia, as he stepped backwards to turn a short ball from Kaneria to leg but stepped too far. Then, Pakistan wrested the initiative when Brian Lara – the man who had made 155 earlier on – gave an edge to a ball from Kaneria that spun into him, out for a duck and the West Indies were 48 for 3. The next over from Shabbir Ahmed, however, yielded eight runs before light was again offered to the batsmen. Coming back, West Indies longed for a big partnership, but it was not to be – Kaneria got his third wicket of the day, with a ball that hit low and was given lbw by the umpire, resulting in 56 for 4, with still 224 runs required. It looked hopeless – however, Wavell Hinds, with no respect for Kaneria's figures of 5–1–6–3, smashed him for two fours in an over, as the West Indies plundered him for eleven runs and made the match more interesting for the spectators at least. Hinds and Smith looked to see it through to stumps, adding 38 runs in a little over 12 overs, but when Devon Smith edged a quicker ball from Kaneria through to Karman Akmal for his eighth catch of the Test and Kaneria's fourth wicket of the innings, all looked truly lost. Wavell Hinds also departed before the day ended, edging a wide ball from Abdul Razzaq, and with the score 114 for 6 overnight, everyone just expected the West Indies to meekly roll over, and that they did – losing three wickets within the space of seven balls as Powell, Browne and King were out in succession. Four overs later, Tino Best tried a massive drive off Shabbir Ahmed, and was easily out as Shahid Afridi took the final catch of the game to secure a Pakistan 136-run win. Strangely enough, Pakistan only made use of three bowlers in the second innings, as Naved-ul-Hasan was injured and Shahid Afridi banned for stepping on the pitch.

Brian Lara was named Man of the Series.

== Tour averages ==
=== Pakistan List-A ===
==== Batting ====
Pakistan – List-A batting averages
Name	M	I	NO	R	Ave	BF	SR	HS	100	50
Shahid Afridi	4	4	0	196	49.00		N/A	104	1	0
Yousuf Youhana	4	4	0	188	47.00		N/A	87	0	1
Younis Khan	4	4	0	150	37.50		N/A	62	0	1
Kamran Akmal	4	4	3	110	110.00		N/A	56*	0	1
Shoaib Malik	4	3	0	99	33.00		N/A	51	0	1
Inzamam-ul-Haq	3	3	0	74	24.66		N/A	51	0	1
Salman Butt	3	3	0	67	22.33		N/A	43	0	0
Bazid Khan	1	1	0	66	66.00		N/A	66	0	1
Abdul Razzaq	3	3	0	60	20.00		N/A	22	0	0
Yasir Hameed	1	1	0	41	41.00		N/A	41	0	0
Iftikhar Anjum	3	3	2	16	16.00		N/A	8*	0	0
Shabbir Ahmed	4	2	1	3	3.00		N/A	2*	0	0
Naved-ul-Hasan	3	3	1	2	1.00		N/A	1	0	0
Arshad Khan	2	0	0	0	N/A		N/A	0	0	0
Shahid Nazir	1	0	0	0	N/A		N/A	0	0	0

==== Bowling ====
Pakistan – List-A bowling averages
Name	M	O	M	R	W	BB	Ave	Econ	SR	4w	5w
Shahid Afridi	4	32.4	3	107	10	4–6	10.70	3.27	19.60	2	0
Abdul Razzaq	3	21.3	2	106	8	4–29	13.25	4.93	16.12	2	0
Naved-ul-Hasan	3	24.2	1	91	7	3–48	13.00	3.73	20.85	0	0
Shabbir Ahmed	4	31.2	3	140	6	2–19	23.33	4.46	31.33	0	0
Shoaib Malik	4	25	1	110	4	2–20	27.50	4.40	37.50	0	0
Iftikhar Anjum	3	21	1	91	2	1–26	45.50	4.33	63.00	0	0
Shahid Nazir	1	5	0	28	1	1–28	28.00	5.60	30.00	0	0
Arshad Khan	2	15	0	60	0	N/A	N/A	4.00	N/A	0	0

=== Pakistan ODI ===
==== Batting ====
Pakistan – ODI batting averages
Name	M	I	NO	R	Ave	BF	SR	HS	100	50
Yousuf Youhana	3	3	0	101	33.66	144	70.13	50	0	1
Younis Khan	3	3	0	97	32.33	98	98.97	48	0	0
Shahid Afridi	3	3	0	92	30.66	61	150.81	56	0	1
Inzamam-ul-Haq	2	2	0	74	37.00	91	81.31	51	0	1
Bazid Khan	1	1	0	66	66.00	97	68.04	66	0	1
Shoaib Malik	3	2	0	64	32.00	117	54.70	51	0	1
Abdul Razzaq	3	3	0	60	20.00	60	100.00	22	0	0
Salman Butt	2	2	0	59	29.50	83	71.08	43	0	0
Kamran Akmal	3	3	2	54	54.00	39	138.46	24*	0	0
Yasir Hameed	1	1	0	41	41.00	54	75.92	41	0	0
Iftikhar Anjum	2	2	2	9	N/A	18	50.00	8*	0	0
Naved-ul-Hasan	3	3	1	2	1.00	5	40.00	1	0	0
Shabbir Ahmed	3	1	0	1	1.00	1	100.00	1	0	0
Arshad Khan	1	0	0	0	N/A	0	N/A	0	0	0

==== Bowling ====
Pakistan – ODI bowling averages
Name	M	O	M	R	W	BB	Ave	Econ	SR	4w	5w
Abdul Razzaq	3	21.3	2	106	8	4–29	13.25	4.93	16.12	2	0
Naved-ul-Hasan	3	24	1	91	7	3–48	13.00	3.79	20.57	0	0
Shahid Afridi	3	26	1	101	6	4–38	16.83	3.88	26.00	1	0
Shabbir Ahmed	3	26.2	1	125	4	2–23	31.25	4.74	39.50	0	0
Shoaib Malik	3	19	1	90	2	2–41	45.00	4.73	57.00	0	0
Iftikhar Anjum	2	16	1	65	1	1–35	65.00	4.06	96.00	0	0
Arshad Khan	1	10	0	44	0	N/A	N/A	4.40	N/A	0	0

=== West Indies ODI (and List-A) ===
==== Batting ====
West Indies – ODI (and List-A) batting averages
Name	M	I	NO	R	Ave	BF	SR	HS	100	50
Chris Gayle	3	3	0	189	63.00	203	93.10	124	1	0
Runako Morton	3	3	0	95	31.66	185	51.35	55	0	1
Wavell Hinds	3	3	0	68	22.66	97	70.10	35	0	0
Shivnarine Chanderpaul	3	3	0	49	16.33	75	65.33	33	0	0
Dwayne Bravo	3	3	0	43	14.33	83	51.80	27	0	0
Courtney Browne	2	2	0	35	17.50	31	112.90	35	0	0
Ian Bradshaw	3	3	0	35	11.66	66	53.03	17	0	0
Ramnaresh Sarwan	3	3	0	30	10.00	71	42.25	17	0	0
Xavier Marshall	2	2	0	10	5.00	35	28.57	7	0	0
Daren Powell	2	2	0	9	4.50	21	42.85	6	0	0
Corey Collymore	3	3	3	1	N/A	5	20.00	1*	0	0
Dwayne Smith	1	1	0	0	0.00	3	0.00	0	0	0
Pedro Collins	1	1	0	0	0.00	3	0.00	0	0	0

==== Bowling ====
West Indies – ODI (and List-A) bowling averages
Name	M	O	M	R	W	BB	Ave	Econ	SR	4w	5w
Corey Collymore	3	27.4	2	115	6	3–40	19.16	4.15	27.66	0	0
Chris Gayle	3	30	0	152	4	3–48	38.00	5.06	45.00	0	0
Ian Bradshaw	3	25	2	132	4	2–27	33.00	5.28	37.50	0	0
Wavell Hinds	3	14	0	83	2	1–23	41.50	5.92	42.00	0	0
Dwayne Bravo	3	23.3	0	149	1	1–31	149.00	6.34	141.00	0	0
Daren Powell	2	14	1	65	1	1–27	65.00	4.64	84.00	0	0
Pedro Collins	1	10	0	49	1	1–49	49.00	4.90	60.00	0	0
Shivnarine Chanderpaul	3	0.2	0	0	0	N/A	N/A	0.00	N/A	0	0

=== Pakistan Test ===
==== Batting ====
Pakistan – Test batting averages
Name	M	I	NO	R	Ave	BF	SR	HS	100	50
Shahid Afridi	2	4	0	214	53.50	196	109.18	122	1	0
Younis Khan	2	4	0	180	45.00	343	52.47	106	1	0
Inzamam-ul-Haq	1	2	1	167	167.00	254	65.74	117*	1	1
Asim Kamal	2	4	0	106	26.50	228	46.49	55	0	2
Shoaib Malik	1	2	0	77	38.50	119	64.70	64	0	1
Kamran Akmal	2	4	0	75	18.75	107	70.09	49	0	0
Abdul Razzaq	2	4	0	72	18.00	176	40.90	41	0	0
Yasir Hameed	2	4	0	63	15.75	101	62.37	26	0	0
Bazid Khan	1	2	0	32	16.00	47	68.08	23	0	0
Naved-ul-Hasan	2	4	1	30	10.00	59	50.84	17	0	0
Salman Butt	1	2	0	27	13.50	59	45.76	27	0	0
Danish Kaneria	2	4	1	10	3.33	27	37.03	6	0	0
Shabbir Ahmed	2	4	1	6	2.00	24	25.00	6	0	0

==== Bowling ====
Pakistan – Test bowling averages
Name	M	O	M	R	W	BB	Ave	Econ	SR	5w	10w
Shabbir Ahmed	2	78.5	14	255	13	4–55	19.61	3.23	36.38	0	0
Danish Kaneria	2	99.2	20	269	11	5–46	24.45	2.70	54.18	1	0
Abdul Razzaq	2	69	16	214	8	3–58	26.75	3.10	51.75	0	0
Shahid Afridi	2	36.1	6	132	6	3–49	22.00	3.64	36.16	0	0
Naved-ul-Hasan	2	48	9	204	1	1–88	204.00	4.25	288.00	0	0
Shoaib Malik	1	19	2	52	0	N/A	N/A	2.73	N/A	0	0

=== West Indies Test ===
==== Batting ====
West Indies – Test batting averages
Name	M	I	NO	R	Ave	BF	SR	HS	100	50
Brian Lara	2	4	0	331	82.75	410	80.73	153	2	0
Shivnarine Chanderpaul	2	4	1	273	91.00	524	52.09	153*	1	1
Wavell Hinds	2	4	0	162	40.50	330	49.09	63	0	2
Devon Smith	2	4	0	103	25.75	242	42.56	49	0	0
Chris Gayle	2	4	0	102	25.50	117	87.17	50	0	1
Ramnaresh Sarwan	2	4	0	70	17.50	191	36.64	55	0	1
Daren Powell	2	4	0	41	10.25	117	35.04	14	0	0
Fidel Edwards	1	2	0	23	11.50	38	60.52	20	0	0
Courtney Browne	2	4	0	23	5.75	91	25.27	12	0	0
Tino Best	1	2	0	22	11.00	36	61.11	18	0	0
Reon King	2	4	0	12	3.00	27	44.44	5	0	0
Corey Collymore	2	4	3	9	9.00	26	34.61	7*	0	0

==== Bowling ====
West Indies – Test bowling averages
Name	M	O	M	R	W	BB	Ave	Econ	SR	5w	10w
Corey Collymore	2	72.2	12	234	15	7–78	15.60	3.23	28.93	1	1
Chris Gayle	2	53.3	6	211	7	5–91	30.14	3.94	45.85	1	0
Fidel Edwards	1	15.2	2	38	6	5–38	6.33	2.47	15.33	1	0
Daren Powell	2	64	9	252	4	2–47	63.00	3.93	96.00	0	0
Tino Best	1	25	2	105	4	4–46	26.25	4.20	37.50	0	0
Reon King	2	51.4	3	251	3	2–46	83.66	4.85	103.33	0	0
Wavell Hinds	2	1	0	1	0	N/A	N/A	1.00	N/A	0	0
Ramnaresh Sarwan	1	2	0	11	0	N/A	N/A	5.50	N/A	0	0

== External sources ==
- CricketArchive – itinerary of events
