= MCC Bicentenary match =

Cricket match

MCC Bicentenary Match
M.C.C.	Rest of the World
455/5d	421/7d
&	&
318/6d	13/1
- Match drawn
- Date: 20–25 August 1987
- Venue: Lord's Cricket Ground, London
- Player of the match: Sunil Gavaskar (batting); Malcolm Marshall (bowling); Clive Rice (fielding)
- Umpires: H.D. Bird; D.R. Shepherd (Eng)

The MCC Bicentenary match was a five-day first-class cricket exhibition match held at Lord's Cricket Ground in London from 20 to 25 August 1987 (with a rest day on 23 August). The match was in celebration of the 200th anniversary of the Marylebone Cricket Club (MCC), which had been founded in 1787, and was contested between an MCC team captained by Mike Gatting, and a "Rest of the World" team captained by Allan Border. It featured many notable international players: with the exception of Clive Rice of South Africa (who at the time were banned from international cricket), 21 of the 22 players had played Test cricket prior to the match.

== Teams ==
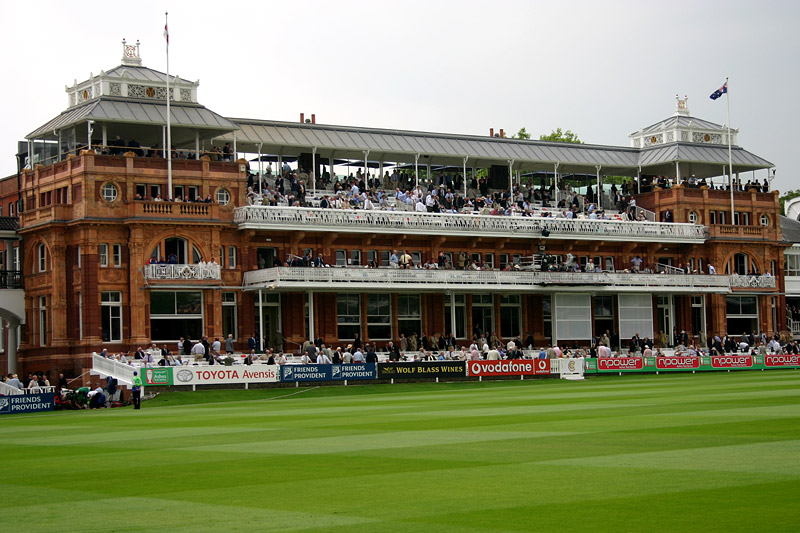
The pavilion at Lord's Cricket Ground, the home of MCC and venue for the match, seen in 2017

Marylebone Cricket Club	Rest of the World
(England) Mike Gatting (c); (Cricket West Indies) Gordon Greenidge; (England) Chris Broad; (England) Graham Gooch; (England) David Gower; (South Africa) Clive Rice; (New Zealand) Richard Hadlee; (India) Ravi Shastri; (England) John Emburey; (Cricket West Indies) Malcolm Marshall; (England) Bruce French (wk)	(Australia) Allan Border (c); (India) Sunil Gavaskar; (Cricket West Indies) Desmond Haynes; (India) Dilip Vengsarkar; (Pakistan) Javed Miandad; (Cricket West Indies) Jeff Dujon (wk); (Pakistan) Imran Khan; (India) Kapil Dev; (Cricket West Indies) Roger Harper; (Cricket West Indies) Courtney Walsh; (Pakistan) Abdul Qadir

The MCC team was chosen from players competing in the County Championship, either eligible for England or as overseas players. The Rest of the World team was formed of players from the other Test-playing sides. England all-rounder Ian Botham was unable to take part because of an injury, while West Indies batsman Viv Richards declined to participate because of commitments to his club, Rishton, in the Lancashire League.

== Match ==
20–25 August 1987
Scorecard

Marylebone Cricket Club	v	Rest of the World
455/5d (133.1 overs); Mike Gatting 179 (272); Abdul Qadir 1/30 (16.2 overs)		421/7d (124 overs); Sunil Gavaskar 188 (351); Malcolm Marshall 3/53 (20 overs)
318/6d (88 overs); Gordon Greenidge 122 (223); Abdul Qadir 2/112 (36 overs)		13/1 (4.3 overs); Roger Harper 9* (16); Malcolm Marshall 1/10 (2.3 overs)

Match drawn
Lord's Cricket Ground, London
Umpires: Harold Bird and David Shepherd
Player of the match: Sunil Gavaskar (batting), Malcolm Marshall (bowling), Clive Rice (fielding)

- MCC won the toss and elected to bat.

The match was drawn after no play was possible on the final day due to rain.

Notable performances in the match included centuries from Graham Gooch, Mike Gatting and Gordon Greenidge for MCC and Sunil Gavaskar (his first at Lord's, in his final first-class match) for the Rest of the World, as well as Roger Harper's run out of Gooch. Although the match did not have Test status, individual performances were recorded on the Lord's honours boards.
