= 2012–13 Quaid-e-Azam Trophy =

2012-2013 Pakistani cricket competition

- Dates: 28 December 2012 – 28 February 2013
- Administrator: Pakistan Cricket Board
- Cricket format: First-class
- Tournament format(s): Two round-robin group stages and final
- Host: Pakistan
- Champions: Karachi Blues (9th title)
- Participants: 14
- Matches: 62
- Most runs: Akbar-ur-Rehman (986)
- Most wickets: Atif Maqbool (55)
- Official website: www.pcb.com.pk

The 2012–13 Quaid-e-Azam Trophy was one of two first-class domestic cricket competitions that were held in Pakistan during the 2012–13 season. It was the 55th edition of the Quaid-e-Azam Trophy, and was contested by fourteen teams representing regional cricket associations. (Note: The top level of domestic cricket in Pakistan was historically played by teams representing regional cricket associations and departments, which were owned and run by corporations, institutions or government departments.) It was preceded in the schedule by the President's Trophy, which was contested by ten departmental teams.

The Pakistan Cricket Board made substantial changes to the structure of domestic first-class cricket for the 2012–13 season. Having competed together for the previous five seasons, the regional associations and departments were separated into their own competitions. The format of the Quaid-e-Azam Trophy was also changed, with two round-robin group stages and a final between the top sides in the "Super-Eight" to determine the winner.

Karachi Blues won the Quaid-e-Azam Trophy for the ninth time, and the twentieth by a Karachi team, beating Sialkot by nine wickets in the final.

== Structure and format ==
The Pakistan Cricket Board made substantial changes to the structure of domestic first-class cricket for the 2012–13 season. Having competed together for the previous five seasons, the regional associations and departments were separated into their own competitions. The regions remained in the Quaid-e-Azam Trophy and the departments were moved into a new President's Trophy competition. The format of the Quaid-e-Azam Trophy was also changed, with two round-robin group stages and a final between the top sides in the "Super-Eight" to determine the winner.

With the absence of departments from the competition, teams were permitted to recruit five departmental players to their squads, of which four could be named for any given match. Kookaburra cricket balls, commonly used in international cricket, were also introduced.

The fourteen teams, the thirteen who competed in 2011–12 plus Bahawalpur, were divided between two groups in the first stage of the competition. The top four teams from each group proceeded to the Super-Eight in the second stage, while the remaining six teams proceeded to the Plate-League. In both the Super-Eight and the Plate-League, the teams were split into two groups based on ranking in the first stage, with the top team in each second stage group contesting a final.

=== Standings and points ===
Positions in the tables were determined by total points, most matches won, fewest matches lost, followed by adjusted net run rate (matches with no result, i.e. those where both teams did not complete their first innings, were disregarded); matches finishing in a draw were decided on first innings scores, with points awarded as follows:

- Win having led on first innings = 9 points
- Win having tied or trailed on first innings = 6 points
- Tie having led on first innings = 5 points
- Draw having led on first innings = 3 points
- Draw having tied on first innings, or tie having trailed on first innings = 2 points
- Loss, draw having trailed or with no result on first innings, or abandoned without a ball bowled = 0 points

== Team locations ==
Locations of teams in Quaid-e-Azam Trophy 2012–13

== Group stage ==
=== Tables ===
Group I
Team	Pld	W	L	T	D	A	Pts
Karachi Blues	6	3	0	0	3	0	36
Islamabad	6	2	2	0	2	0	18
Lahore Ravi	6	1	0	0	5	0	12
Sialkot	6	1	1	0	4	0	12
Quetta	6	1	2	0	3	0	9
Multan	6	0	1	0	5	0	9
Peshawar	6	0	2	0	4	0	3

Group II
Team	Pld	W	L	T	D	A	Pts
Rawalpindi	6	3	1	0	2	0	30
Lahore Shalimar	6	3	1	0	2	0	30
Karachi Whites	6	2	1	0	3	0	24
Hyderabad	6	2	2	0	2	0	18
Abbottabad	6	1	2	0	3	0	15
Bahawalpur	6	0	1	0	5	0	3
Faisalabad	6	0	3	0	3	0	0

Legend
Top four teams advanced to the Super-Eight stage
Bottom three teams entered the Bottom six stage

=== Results ===
==== Group I ====
Source:Cricinfo

28–31 December 2012
Scorecard

Islamabad	v	Multan
1st innings forfeited		1st innings forfeited
209 (60.2 overs); Shan Masood 99 (184); Rahat Ali 4/73 (21 overs)		138 (43.3 overs); Rizwan Haider 52 (45); Shehzad Azam 5/21 (11 overs)

Islamabad won by 71 runs
Diamond Club Ground, Islamabad
Umpires: Ahsan Raza and Ehtesham-ul-Haq

- Multan won the toss and elected to field
- First-class debuts: Ahmed Rasheed, Ahsan Nazir, Maqbool Ahmed, Mohammad Rameez, Shehbaz Hasan and Usman Liaqat (Multan)
- Islamabad 6 points, Multan 0 points

28–31 December 2012
Scorecard

Karachi Blues	v	Quetta
502/9d (150.2 overs); Khurram Manzoor 162 (386); Jalat Khan 4/125 (37.2 overs)		242 (115.3 overs); Taimur Ali 76 (221); Azam Hussain 5/50 (29.3 overs)
14/1d (3 overs); Asad Baig 7* (8); Najaf Shah 1/8 (2 overs)		127/3 (54 overs); Ali Asad 63 (132); Akbar-ur-Rehman 2/50 (16 overs)

Match drawn
National Bank of Pakistan Sports Complex, Karachi
Umpires: Ghaffar Kazmi and Nadeem Iqbal

- Quetta won the toss and elected to field
- First-class debut: Umar Qasim (Quetta)
- Karachi Blues 3 points, Quetta 0 points

28–31 December 2012
Scorecard

Sialkot	v	Lahore Ravi
1st innings forfeited		1st innings forfeited
117/1d (63 overs); Naved Sarwar 50* (205); Asif Ashfaq 1/34 (10 overs)		28/1 (11 overs); Irfan Haider 23* (35); Mohammad Imran 1/20 (4 overs)

Match drawn
Zahoor Elahi Stadium, Gujrat
Umpires: Kamal Marchant and Raweed Khan

- Lahore Ravi won the toss and elected to field
- Points Sialkot 2 points, Lahore Ravi 2 points

2–5 January 2013
Scorecard

Karachi Blues	v	Peshawar
252 (75.2 overs); Akbar-ur-Rehman 96* (198); Waqar Ahmed 5/56 (22 overs)		166 (50.2 overs); Sajjad Ahmed 34 (89); Tariq Haroon 4/43 (13.2 overs)
10/0 (1.4 overs); Khurram Manzoor 6* (4)		95 (21.4 overs); Akbar Badshah 23 (56); Tanvir Ahmed 5/47 (11 overs)

Karachi Blues won by 10 wickets
National Stadium, Karachi
Umpires: Ghaffar Kazmi and Nadeem Iqbal

- Karachi Blues won the toss and elected to field
- Karachi Blues 9 points, Peshawar 0 points

2–5 January 2013
Scorecard

Islamabad	v	Lahore Ravi
352 (104 overs); Umair Khan 113 (222); Adnan Rasool 4/80 (31 overs)		216 (61 overs); Adnan Akmal 86* (136); Shehzad Azam 4/63 (17 overs)
		178/8 (58 overs); Adnan Akmal 71 (113); Imad Wasim 2/27 (12 overs)

Match drawn
Diamond Club Ground, Islamabad
Umpires: Kamal Merchant and Raweed Khan

- Lahore Ravi won the toss and elected to bat
- Islamabad 3 points, Lahore Ravi 0 points

3–6 January 2013
Scorecard

Multan	v	Quetta
77/3 (47.3 overs); Usman Liaqat 32 (110); Jalat Khan 1/11 (8 overs)		210 (72.5 overs); Jalat Khan 44 (68); Rahat Ali 4/62 (22 overs)

Match drawn
Multan Cricket Stadium, Multan
Umpires: Ahsan Raza and Majid Hussain

- Multan won the toss and elected to field
- Multan 0 points, Quetta 0 points

7–10 January 2013
Scorecard

Karachi Blues	v	Sialkot
354 (107.2 overs); Khurram Manzoor 63 (147); Abdur Rehman 4/127 (47 overs)		124 (47.2 overs); Faisal Khan 57 (105); Akbar-ur-Rehman 4/19 (10 overs)
22/0 (3 overs); Khurram Manzoor 21* (11)		249 f/o (57.2 overs); Ali Khan 82 (82); Akbar-ur-Rehman 4/65 (12.2 overs)

Karachi Blues won by 10 wickets
National Bank of Pakistan Sports Complex, Karachi
Umpires: Ghaffar Kazmi and Nadeem Iqbal

- Karachi Blues won the toss and elected to bat
- Karachi Blues 9 points, Sialkot 0 points

8–11 January 2013
Scorecard

Lahore Ravi	v	Quetta
414/4d (123 overs); Abid Ali 202* (386); Mohibullah 2/72 (20 overs)		236 (89.3 overs); Qaiser Abbas 117 (202); Adnan Rasool 5/67 (36.3 overs)
		106 (57.3 overs); Qaiser Abbas 27 (64); Mohammad Khalil 5/44 (16 overs)

Lahore Ravi won by an innings and 72 runs
Lahore City Cricket Association Ground, Lahore
Umpires: Kamal Merchant and Raweed Khan

- Quetta won the toss and elected to field
- First-class debuts: Ali Zahid, Ikhlaq Butt and Yasir Ajmal (Lahore Ravi)
- Lahore Ravi 9 points, Quetta 0 points

8–11 January 2013
Scorecard

Multan	v	Peshawar
340 (115.5 overs); Naved Yasin 141* (255); Sajjad Ahmed 6/62 (24.5 overs)		194 (55.3 overs); Mohammad Fayyaz 75 (123); Shahbaz Hussain 5/40 (15 overs)
		294/5 (89 overs); Israrullah 127 (233); Sohaib Maqsood 4/62 (17 overs)

Match drawn
Multan Cricket Stadium, Multan
Umpires: Aftab Gillani and Akram Raza

- Multan won the toss and elected to field
- Multan 3 points, Peshawar 0 points

13–16 January 2013
Scorecard

Lahore Ravi	v	Multan
248 (89.2 overs); Irfan Haider 81 (146); Rahat Ali 5/44 (25.2 overs)		309 (88.2 overs); Sohaib Maqsood 107 (142); Adnan Rasool 5/91 (29 overs)
252d (72 overs); Usman Liaqat 65 (113); Ali Manzoor 4/74 (23 overs)		219 (61 overs); Ikhlaq Butt 105 (153); Zulfiqar Babar 4/78 (27 overs)

Match drawn
Lahore City Cricket Association Ground, Lahore
Umpires: Akmal Hayat and Saqib Khan

- Lahore Ravi won the toss and elected to field
- First-class debuts: Qaumbar Iqbal (Lahore Ravi); Zeeshan Ashraf (Multan)
- Multan 3 points, Lahore Ravi 0 points

13–16 January 2013
Scorecard

Sialkot	v	Islamabad
202 (59 overs); Nayyer Abbas 67 (108 overs); Iftikhar Anjum 5/62 (19 overs)		193 (71.3 overs); Imad Wasim 70* (165); Nayyer Abbas 4/27 (17.3 overs)
212/1 (47.2 overs); Majid Jahangir 112* (137); Shehzad Azam 1/56 (10 overs)		217 (76 overs); Faizan Riaz 51 (92); Ali Khan 3/42 (18 overs)

Sialkot won by 9 wickets
Gaddafi Stadium, Lahore
Umpires: Ahsan Raza and Shozab Raza

- Sialkot won the toss and elected to field
- Sialkot 9 points, Islamabad 0 points

14–17 January 2013
Scorecard

Peshawar	v	Quetta
117/4 (41.3 overs); Naved Khan 32 (60); Gohar Faiz 5/39 (13.3 overs)		483/8d (140 overs); Ali Asad 210* (418); Akbar Badshah 2/54 (19 overs)
195f/o (41.2 overs); Gauhar Ali 59 (59); Arun Lal 5/69 (19 overs)

Quetta won by an innings and 171 runs
Arbab Niaz Stadium, Peshawar
Umpires: Akram Raza and Zameer Haider

- Peshawar won the toss and elected to field
- Quetta 9 points, Peshawar 0 points

19–22 January 2013
Scorecard

Multan	v	Karachi Blues
363 (107.1 overs); Saeed Anwar 76 (167); Tabish Khan 4/103 (24 overs)		410 (123.4 overs); Mohammad Waqas 150 (240); Zulfiqar Babar 6/149 (49.4 overs)
		203/4 (84 overs); Fakhar Zaman 83 (181); Sohaib Maqsood 2/55 (15 overs)

Match drawn
Multan Cricket Stadium, Multan
Umpires: Aftab Gillani and Akram Raza

- Multan won the toss and elected to field
- First-class debut: Fakhar Zaman (Karachi Blues)
- Karachi Blues 3 points, Multan 0 points

19–22 January 2013
Scorecard

Peshawar	v	Sialkot
346 (119.4 overs); Mohammad Rizwan 154* (301); Bilawal Bhatti 4/101 (28 overs)		269 (99.1 overs); Nayyer Abbas 54 (86); Afaq Ahmed 4/82 (32 overs)
209/5 (74.2 overs); Aftab Alam 100* (175); Faisal Rasheed 2/59 (25 overs)		32/0 (16 overs); Naved Sarwar 16* (52)

Match drawn
Arbab Niaz Stadium, Peshawar
Umpires: Ahmed Shahab and Qaiser Waheed

- Peshawar won the toss and elected to bat
- First-class debut: Umar Farooq (Peshawar)
- Peshawar 3 points, Sialkot 0 points

20–23 January 2013
Scorecard

Islamabad	v	Quetta
134 (47 overs); Raheel Majeed 31 (40); Gohar Faiz 8/50 (18 overs)		263 (69.1 overs); Qaiser Abbas 73 (83); Zohaib Ahmed 4/74 (16.1 overs)
250/1 (64.5 overs); Raheel Majeed 124* (211); Gohar Faiz 1/76 (17 overs)		122 (34.2 overs); Taimur Ali 40 (55); Nasrullah Khan 5/27 (12.2 overs)

Islamabad won by 9 wickets
Diamond Club Ground, Islamabad
Umpires: Saqib Khan and Tahir Shah

- Quetta won the toss and elected to bat
- First-class debut: Hamza Nadeem (Islamabad)
- Islamabad 6 points, Quetta 0 points

25–28 January 2013
Scorecard

Lahore Ravi	v	Karachi Blues
261 (81.4 overs); Imran Farhat 127 (164); Anwar Ali 3/44 (19 overs)		481 (139.2 overs); Akbar-ur-Rehman 225 (353); Adnan Rasool 5/133 (47 overs)
305 (96.1 overs); Adnan Akmal 108* (229); Misbah Khan 3/77 (18 overs)		69/5 (10 overs); Fakhar Zaman 25 (19); Imran ali 3/34 (5 overs)

Match drawn
Gaddafi Stadium, Lahore
Umpires: Akmal Hayat and Nadeem Iqbal

- Lahore Ravi won the toss and elected to bat
- First-class debut: Mohammad Salman (Lahore Ravi)
- Karachi Blues 3 points, Lahore Ravi 0 points

25–28 January 2013
Scorecard

Sialkot	v	Quetta
232 (86.3 overs); Shoaib Malik 77 (154); Najaf Shah 5/62 (31 overs)		225 (87.1 overs); Mohibullah 73 (184); Nayyer Abbas 4/70 (35 overs)
262 (87 overs); Mohammad Ayub Dogar 94* (217); Arun Lal 4/70 (25 overs)		193/3 (54 overs); Bismillah Khan 58 (93); Nabeel Malik 1/23 (6 overs)

Match drawn
Lahore City Cricket Association Ground, Lahore
Umpires: Ehteshamuddin and Shozab Raza

- Sialkot won the toss and elected to bat
- First-class debuts: Hamal Wahab (Quetta), Zahidullah (Sialkot)
- Sialkot 3 points, Quetta 0 points

26–29 January 2013
Scorecard

Peshawar	v	Islamabad
103 (34.3 overs); Nawaz Ahmed 53 (87); Iftikhar Anjum 5/28 (10 overs)		179 (69.5 overs); Fahad Iqbal 44 (66); Afaq Ahmed 3/12 (7 overs)
439/9d (122 overs); Israrullah 155 (311); Nasrullah Khan 4/98 (28 overs)		221/5 (89 overs); Imad Wasim 52* (113); Umar Farooq 2/75 (26 overs)

Match drawn
Arbab Niaz Stadium, Peshawar
Umpires: Akram Raza and Tahir Shah

- Peshawar won the toss and elected to bat
- Islamabad 3 points, Peshawar 0 points

31 January – 3 February 2013
Scorecard

Islamabad	v	Karachi Blues
197 (87 overs); Naeem Anjum 64 (150); Azam Hussain 6/53 (30 overs)		345 (80.1 overs); Khurram Manzoor 79 (79); Nasrullah Khan 4/73 (21.1 overs)
115 (42.2 overs); Naeem Anjum 39 (69); Akbar-ur-Rehman 3/63 (14.2 overs)

Karachi Blues won by an innings and 33 runs
Diamond Club Ground, Islamabad
Umpires: Ahmed Shahab and Sajid Afridi

- Karachi Blues won the toss and elected to field
- First-class debuts: Zeeshan Ali (Islamabad) and Jahangir Shah (Karachi Blues)
- Karachi Blues 9 points, Islamabad 0 points

31 January – 3 February 2013
Scorecard

Lahore Ravi	v	Peshawar
512/6d (149.3 overs); Imran Farhat 308 (429); Riaz Afridi 2/102 (33 overs)		209 (87.3 overs); Naved Khan 61 (188); Adnan Rasool 4/70 (39 overs)
		59/3f/o (37 overs); Israrullah 19* (111); Asif Ashfaq 1/6 (4 overs)

Match drawn
Lahore City Cricket Association Ground, Lahore
Umpires: Majid Hussain and Riazuddin

- Peshawar won the toss and elected to field
- First-class debut: Abdul Wahab Dar (Lahore Ravi)
- Lahore Ravi 3 points, Peshawar 0 points

31 January – 3 February 2013
Scorecard

Sialkot	v	Multan
189 (75.4 overs); Majid Jahangir 105 (214); Zulfiqar Babar 7/67 (30 overs)		428 (127 overs); Sohaib Maqsood 116 (193); Mohammad Abbas 3/106 (44 overs)
100/2 (50 overs); Faisal Khan 41* (125); Rizwan Haider 1/22 (9 overs)

Match drawn
Jinnah Stadium, Sialkot
Umpires: Shozab Raza and Zameer Haider

- Multan won the toss and elected to field
- First-class debuts: Hasan Iqbal (Multan), Adnan Sikhu and Sunny Pervez (Sialkot)
- Multan 3 points, Sialkot 0 points

==== Group II ====
Source:Cricinfo

28–31 December 2012
Scorecard

Faisalabad	v	Bahawalpur
120/4 (42 overs); Asif Ali 53 (87); Kamran Hussain 3/36 (13)		181 (63.4 overs); Usman Tariq 39 (104); Naseer Akram 5/45 (21 overs)

Match drawn
Iqbal Stadium, Faisalabad
Umpires: Qaiser Waheed and Shozab Raza

- Faisalabad won the toss and elected to field
- First-class debuts: Aamer Ijaz, Ataullah and Shahan Akram (Bahawalpur), Ghulam Dastagir and Moazzam Hayat (Faisalabad)
- Faisalabad 0 points, Bahawalpur 0 points

28–31 December 2012
Scorecard

Hyderabad	v	Abbottabad
170 (64.1 overs); Mir Ali 66 (111); Yasir Shah 4/68 (24.1 overs)		228 (80.5 overs); Yasir Hameed 84 (118); Zahid Mahmood 5/58 (24 overs)
225/4 (76.4 overs); Rizwan Ahmed 100* (217); Riaz Kail 1/2 (4 overs)		275 (102 overs); Yasir Shah 60 (125); Shoaib Laghari 4/61 (20 overs)

Match drawn
Niaz Stadium, Hyderabad
Umpires: Khalid Mahmood and Saleem Badar

- Hyderabad won the toss and elected to field
- First-class debut: Wasim Akhtar (Abbottabad)
- Abbottabad 3 points, Hyderabad 0 points

28–31 December 2012
Scorecard

Karachi Whites	v	Lahore Shalimar
170 (48.5 overs); Fawad Alam 53 (76); Aizaz Cheema 6/62 (17.5 overs)		254 (93.2 overs); Usman Salahuddin 63 (145); Mohammad Sami 5/77 (26.2 overs)
142 (41.5 overs); Saad Ali 58 (83); Aizaz Cheema 4/36 (12.5 overs)		59/0 22 overs); Imran Butt 36* (77)

Lahore Shalimar won by 10 wickets
National Stadium, Karachi
Umpires: Aftab Gillani and Sajid Afridi

- Karachi Whites won the toss and elected to bat
- First-class debuts: Mir Hamza and Saad Ali (Karachi Whites), Imran Butt and Umar Siddiq (Lahore Shalimar)
- Lahore Shalimar 9 points, Karachi Whites 0 points

2–5 January 2013
Scorecard

Hyderabad	v	Rawalpindi
177 (59.1 overs); Mir Ali 70 (94); Sadaf Hussain 5/25 (19.1 overs)		302 (105 overs); Awais Zia 87 (168); Zahid Mahmood 3/62 (24 overs)
320 (100.1 overs); Rizwan Ahmed 64 (198); Nasir Malik 4/105 (27.1 overs)		199/4 (52 overs); Babar Naeem 68 (104); Nauman Ali 2/74 (23 overs)

Rawalpindi won by 6 wickets
Niaz Stadium, Hyderabad, Sindh
Umpires: Khalid Mahmood and Saleem Badar

- Hyderabad won the toss and elected to bat
- First-class debut: Umar Waheed (Rawalpindi)
- Rawalpindi 9 points, Hyderabad 0 points

2–5 January 2013
Scorecard

Karachi Whites	v	Abbottabad
459/3d (126 overs); Khalid Latif 155 (266); Yasir Shah 2/162 (46 overs)		146 (61.2 overs); Hammad Ali 37 (71); Atif Maqbool 6/60 (25 overs)
		168 (41.2 overs); Yasir Hameed 39 (49); Atif Maqbool 7/59 (14.2 overs)

Karachi Whites won by an innings and 145 runs
National Bank of Pakistan Sports Complex, Karachi
Umpires: Sajid Afridi and Tahir Shah

- Abbottabad won the toss and elected to bat
- Karachi Whites 9 points, Abbottabad 0 points

3–6 January 2013
Scorecard

Lahore Shalimar	v	Bahawalpur
		65/1 (30 overs); Shahan Akram 39 (87); Aizaz Cheema 1/18 (9 overs)

Match drawn
Lahore City Cricket Association Ground, Lahore
Umpires: Riazuddin and Saqib Khan

- Lahore Shalimar won the toss and elected to field
- Lahore Shalimar 0 points, Bahawalpur 0 points

7–10 January 2013
Scorecard

Karachi Whites	v	Rawalpindi
185 (58.3 overs); Sarfraz Ahmed 38 (54); Sadaf Hussain 6/52 (18.3 overs)		153 (69.5 overs); Sohail Tanvir 37 (90); Atif Maqbool 5/62 (21.5 overs)
171/7 (48 overs); Khalid Latif 51 (113); Haseeb Azam 2/18 (10 overs)		199 (57.2 overs); Umar Amin 57 (95); Faraz Ahmed 4/10 (4.2 overs)

Karachi Whites won by 3 wickets
National Stadium, Karachi
Umpires: Akmal Hayat and Sajid Afridi

- Karachi Whites won the toss and elected to field
- Karachi Whites 9 points, Rawalpindi 0 points

8–11 January 2013
Scorecard

Lahore Shalimar	v	Faisalabad
458 (166.2 overs); Umar Akmal 107 (180); Asad Ali 4/117 (40.2 overs)		265 (104.5 overs); Mohammad Salman 76* (111); Aizaz Cheema 5/64 (29 overs)
		47/0 (9 overs); Asif Ali 37* (32)

Match drawn
Gaddafi Stadium, Lahore
Umpires: Riazuddin and Saqib Khan

- Lahore Shalimar won the toss and elected to field
- Lahore Shalimar 3 points, Faisalabad 0 points

8–11 January 2013
Scorecard

Abbottabad	v	Bahawalpur
337 (106.4 overs); Yasir Hameed 103 (171); Kamran Hussain 3/75 (21 overs)		216 (56.1 overs); Rehan Rafiq 55 (74); Ahmed Jamal 6/80 (23.1 overs)
70/2 (21 overs); Hammad Ali 37* (68); Mohammad Talha 2/26 (5 overs)		296 (83.4 overs); Kamran Hussain 79 (131); Ahmed Jamal 5/95 (28.4 overs)

Match drawn
Bahawal Stadium, Bahawalpur
Umpires: Khalid Mahmood and Saleem Badar

- Abbottabad won the toss and elected to field
- First-class debuts: Aziz-ur-Rehman and Khalilullah (Abbottabad)
- Abbottabad 3 points, Bahawalpur 0 points

13–16 January 2013
Scorecard

Hyderabad	v	Karachi Whites
305 (104.5 overs); Rizwan Ahmed 105 (227); Atif Maqbool 5/97 (38 overs)		496/8d (149 overs); Fawad Alam 153* (206); Mir Ali 3/25 (5 overs)
227 (76 overs); Rizwan Ahmed 104 (158); Atif Maqbool 3/94 (29 overs)

Match drawn
Niaz Stadium, Hyderabad
Umpires: Ghaffar Kazmi and Qaiser Waheed

- Hyderabad won the toss and elected to bat
- Karachi Whites 3 points, Hyderabad 0 points

13–16 January 2013
Scorecard

Rawalpindi	v	Faisalabad
132 (40.1 overs); Umar Waheed 39 (73); Waqas Maqsood 4/62 (19 overs)		226 (72.1 overs); Mohammad Salman 70* (114); Sadaf Hussain 4/63 (22 overs)
225/8 (85.4 overs); Umar Waheed 99* (236); Waqas Maqsood 6/93 (38 overs)		130 (41.3 overs); Mohammad Salman 42 (73); Sadaf Hussain 4/17 (5.3 overs)

Rawalpindi won by 2 wickets
Mirpur Cricket Stadium, Mirpur
Umpires: Ahmed Shahab and Ehtesham-ul-Haq

- Rawalpindi won the toss and elected to field
- First-class debut: Farhan Aftab (Faisalabad)
- Rawalpindi 6 points, Faisalabad 0 points

14–17 January 2013
Scorecard

Abbottabad	v	Lahore Shalimar
104 (34.5 overs); Ikramullah Khan 33 (67); Zia-ul-Haq 4/24 (10.5 overs)		199 (59.4 overs); Aamer Sajjad 60 (84); Khalid Usman 4/55 (16.4)
256 (69.1 overs); Yasir Hameed 51 (53); Mohammad Irfan 5/96 (25.1 overs)		385/4d (88.5 overs); Imran Butt 124 (171); Ahmed Jamal 3/104 (25 overs)

Lahore Shalimar won by 222 runs
Gohati Cricket Stadium, Swabi
Umpires: Majid Hussain and Nadeem Iqbal

- Abbottabad won the toss and elected to field
- Lahore Shalimar 9 points, Abbottabad 0 points

19–22 January 2013
Scorecard

Abbottabad	v	Faisalabad
135 (45.5 overs); Yasir Hameed 49 (75); Waqas Maqsood 7/40 (16.5 overs)		92 (40.5 overs); Usman Arshad 22 (58); Yasir Shah 6/20 (13.5 overs)
114/2 (27.1 overs); Hammad Ali 56 (74); Ammar Mahmood 1/21 (4 overs)		152 (48.2 overs); Ammar Mahmood 59 (100); Yasir Shah 6/49 (19.2 overs)

Abbottabad won by 8 wickets
Gohati Cricket Stadium, Swabi
Umpires: Ahsan Raza and Zameer Haider

- Abbottabad won the toss and elected to field

19–22 January 2013
Scorecard

Bahawalpur	v	Hyderabad
194 (66.1 overs); Usman Tariq 72 (131); Nauman Ali 3/25 (9.1 overs)		513/9d (140.3 overs); Rizwan Ahmed 157 (274); Ansar Javed 3/68 (23 overs)
173f/o (58.4 overs); Ansar Javed 59* (90); Nasir Awais 6/62 (24.4 overs)

Hyderabad won by an innings and 146 runs
Bahawal Stadium, Bahawalpur
Umpires: Khalid Mahmood and Saleem Badar

- Bahawalpur won the toss and elected to field
- First-class debut: Mohammad Zahir (Bahawalpur)
- Hyderabad 9 points, Bahawalpur 0 points

19–22 January 2013
Scorecard

Lahore Shalimar	v	Rawalpindi
116 (54 overs); Umar Siddiq 46 (145); Nasir Malik 4/31 (13 overs)		157 (55.3 overs); Haseeb Azam 46 (73); Aizaz Cheema 4/48 (17 overs)
215 (69.2 overs); Umar Akmal 52 (40); Hammad Azam 3/33 (13 overs)		198 (69 overs); Awais Zia 75 (116); Aizaz Cheema 4/52 (21 overs)

Rawalpindi won by 24 runs
Mirpur Cricket Stadium, Mirpur
Umpires: Akmal Hayat and Sajid Afridi

- Lahore Shalimar won the toss and elected to field
- First-class debut: Adil Gulbahar (Rawalpindi)
- Rawalpindi 9 points, Lahore Shalimar 0 points

25–28 January 2013
Scorecard

Faisalabad	v	Hyderabad
187 (80.2 overs); Naved Latif 61 (128); Rehan Riaz 3/26 (12 overs)		254 (75.5 overs); Lal Kumar 64 (108); Asad Ali 5/54 (20 overs)
122 (56.2 overs); Zeeshan Butt 38 (103); Nauman Ali 4/31 (16.2 overs)		142 (39.5 overs); Aqeel Anjum 38 (62); Asad Ali 6/53 (16.5 overs)

Hyderabad won by 87 runs
Iqbal Stadium, Faisalabad
Umpires: Majid Hussain and Zameer Haider

- Faisalabad won the toss and elected to field
- First-class debuts: Bilal Yousuf and Zeeshanullah (Faisalabad)
- Hyderabad 9 points, Faisalabad 0 points

25–28 January 2013
Scorecard

Abbottabad	v	Rawalpindi
146 (52.2 overs); Adnan Raees 49 (120); Hammad Azam 4/39 (9 overs)		498/9d (151 overs); Umar Waheed 183 (322); Ahmed Jamal 3/87 (26 overs)
110/5 (37 overs); Waqar Orakzai 34* (72); Hammad Azam 2/10 (6 overs)		289/8d (70 overs); Umar Amin 71 (137); Aziz-ur-Rehman 5/56 (18 overs)

Match drawn
Gohati Cricket Stadium, Swabi
Umpires: Ahmed Shahab and Qaiser Waheed

- Abbottabad won the toss and elected to field
- First-class debut: Sohail Akhtar (Abbottabad)
- Rawalpindi 3 points, Abbottabad 0 points

25–28 January 2013
Scorecard

Bahawalpur	v	Karachi Whites
362 (109.1 overs); Kamran Hussain 139 (231); Atif Maqbool 5/113 (33.1 overs)		351 (102 overs); Owais Rehmani 146* (299); Ansar Javed 3/67 (28 overs)
245/8d (92 overs); Kamran Hussain 118* (207); Faraz Ahmed 4/26 (12 overs)		65/2 (12 overs); Mohtashim Ali 29* (29); Usman Tariq 1/3 (2 overs)

Match drawn
Bahawal Stadium, Bahawalpur
Umpires: Raweed Khan and Saleem Badar

- Bahawalpur won the toss and elected to bat
- First-class debut: Shahid Majeed (Bahawalpur)
- Bahawalpur 3 points, Karachi Whites 0 points

31 January – 3 February 2013
Scorecard

Faisalabad	v	Karachi Whites
148 (47 overs); Zeeshan Butt 54* (99); Atif Maqbool 5/55 (14 overs)		297 (63 overs); Daniyal Ahsan 90 (132); Asad Ali 7/97 (22 overs)
213/6 (66 overs); Zeeshan Butt 90* (162); Abdul Ameer 2/49 (18 overs)		207 (48.1 overs); Khalid Latif 113 (117); Samiullah Khan 6/40 (17.1 overs)

Match drawn
Mirpur Cricket Stadium, Mirpur
Umpires: Akram Raza and Ehtesham-ul-Haq

- Faisalabad won the toss and elected to field
- First-class debut: Abdul Rehman (Faisalabad)
- Karachi Whites 3 points, Faisalabad 0 points

31 January – 3 February 2013
Scorecard

Lahore Shalimar	v	Hyderabad
346/9d (93.3 overs); Usman Salahuddin 101* (182); Rehan Riaz 5/60 (23.3 overs)		103 (43.1 overs); Sharjeel Khan 23 (20); Aizaz Cheema 5/33 (16 overs)
		218 (61.4 overs); Sharjeel Khan 60 (92); Wahab Riaz 4/53 (17 overs)

Lahore Shalimar won by an innings and 25 runs
Gaddafi Stadium, Lahore
Umpires: Aftab Gillani and Kamal Merchant

- Lahore Shalimar won the toss and elected to field
- First-class debut: Imam-ul-Haq (Lahore Shalimar)
- Lahore Shalimar 9 points, Hyderabad 0 points

31 January – 3 February 2013
Scorecard

Rawalpindi	v	Bahawalpur
404/7d (97 overs); Umar Amin 129 (114); Imranullah Aslam 2/32 (10 overs)		316 (87.5 overs); Usman Tariq 102 (122); Hammad Azam 3/54 (14.5 overs)
137/3 (31.5 overs); Umar Amin 44 (47); Imranullah Aslam 2/50 (12.5 overs)

Match drawn
Rawalpindi Cricket Stadium, Rawalpindi
Umpires: Ghaffar Kazmi and Tahir Shah

- Rawalpindi won the toss and elected to bat
- First-class debuts Hamid Ali (Bahawalpur) and Raza Shah (Rawalpindi)
- Rawalpindi 3 points, Bahawalpur 0 points

== Bottom six stage ==
=== Tables ===
Pool A
Team	Pld	W	L	T	D	A	Pts
Faisalabad	2	1	0	0	1	0	12
Multan	2	0	0	0	2	0	3
Abbottabad	2	0	1	0	1	0	0

Pool B
Team	Pld	W	L	T	D	A	Pts
Bahawalpur	2	0	0	0	2	0	6
Peshawar	2	0	0	0	2	0	2
Quetta	2	0	0	0	2	0	2

Legend
The top team advanced to the final

=== Results ===
==== Pool A ====
Source:Cricinfo

6–9 February 2013
Scorecard

Abbottabad	v	Multan
131 (46 overs); Khalid Usman 30 (45); Saeed Anwar jnr 5/14 (14 overs)		220/4 (54 overs); Saeed Anwar jnr 100* (117); Aziz-ur-Rehman 1/22 (5 overs)

Match drawn
Gohati Cricket Stadium, Swabi
Umpires: Ahmed Shahab and Kamal Merchant

- Multan won the toss and elected to field
- First-class debuts Abdul Muqeet, Mohammad Asif and Mohammad Imran (Multan)
- No play due to rain on day 1 and day 2
- Multan 3 points, Abbottabad 0 points

12–15 February 2013
Scorecard

Abbottabad	v	Faisalabad
203 (44.5 overs); Rameez Ahmed 87 (126); Samiullah Khan 5/47 (14 overs)		453 (104.5 overs); Khurram Shehzad 136 (181); Aziz-ur-Rehman 3/105 (26 overs)
306f/o (97.3 overs); Rameez Ahmed 131* (227); Naseer Akram 4/78 (24.3 overs)		60/2 (9.5 overs); Mohammad Salman 24* (24); Fazl-e-Rabbi 2/26 (5 overs)

Faisalabad won by 8 wickets
Mirpur Cricket Stadium, Mirpur
Umpires: Ehtesham-ul-Haq and Riazuddin

- Abbottabad won the toss and elected to field
- First-class debut: Mustansar Hussain and Zeeshan-ul-Haq (Faisalabad)
- Faisalabad 9 points, Abbottabad 0 points
- Abbottabad is eliminated as a result of this match

18–21 February 2013
Scorecard

Multan	v	Faisalabad
250 (80.5 overs); Sohaib Maqsood 65 (82 overs); Samiullah Khan 7/52 (26.5 overs)		256 (76.5 overs); Ali Waqas 105* (191); Zulfiqar Babar 6/77 (30 overs)
45/3 (18 overs); Zeeshan Ashraf 15 (48); Imran Khalid 1/2 (3 overs)		198 (72.1 overs); Mohammad Shahid 30 (65); Rizwan Haider 3/38 (13 overs)

Match drawn
Multan Cricket Stadium, Multan
Umpires: Aftab Gillani and Qaiser Waheed

- Faisalabad won the toss and elected to bat
- Faisalabad 3 points, Multan 0 points
- Faisalabad qualify for the Six Bottom Teams Final and Multan is eliminated as a result of this match

==== Pool B ====
Source:Cricinfo

6–9 February 2013
Scorecard

Peshawar	v	Quetta
1st innings forfeited		1st innings forfeited
322/7d (118 overs); Nawaz Ahmed 111 (202); Arun Lal 2/57 (24 overs)		261/8 (89.4 overs); Ali Asad 100 (209); Imran Khan 3/53 (16.4 overs)

Match drawn
Arbab Niaz Stadium, Peshawar
Umpires: Majid Hussain and Qaiser Waheed

- Quetta won the toss and elected to field
- First-class debut: Azizullah (Peshawar)
- No play due to rain on day 1
- Peshawar 2 points, Quetta 2 points

12–15 February 2013
Scorecard

Bahawalpur	v	Quetta
268 (105.4 overs); Kamran Hussain 123 (201); Jalat Khan 4/54 (26.4 overs)		159 (61.3 overs); Shahbaz Khan 30 (100); Bilal Khilji 5/23 (15.3 overs)
275/8d 69.4 overs); Rehan Rafiq 84 (138); Arun Lal 4/65 (19 overs)		241/6 (88 overs); Ata-ur-Rehman 68* (193); Ataullah 4/83 (21 overs)

Match drawn
Multan Cricket Stadium, Multan
Umpires: Akmal Hayat and Saqib Khan

- Quetta won the toss and elected to field
- Bahawalpur 3 points, Quetta 0 points
- Quetta is eliminated as a result of this match

18–21 February 2013
Scorecard

Bahawalpur	v	Peshawar
292 (82.5 overs); Hamid Ali 89 (130); Afaq Ahmed 6/46 (15.5 overs)		172 (67.4 overs); Jamaluddin 82 (126); Kamran Hussain 5/44 (16.4 overs)
376 (103.4 overs); Bilal Khilji 74 (188); Sajjad Ahmed 5/62 (17.4 overs)		149/4 (31 overs); Mohammad Rizwan 53 (69); Imranullah Aslam 2/43 (11 overs)

Match drawn
Mirpur Cricket Stadium, Mirpur
Umpires: Akmal Hayat and Shozab Raza

- Bahawalpur won the toss and elected to bat
- Bahawalpur 3 points, Peshawar 0 points
- Bahawalpur qualify for the Six Bottom Teams Final and Peshawar is eliminated as a result of this match

=== Final ===
24–28 February 2013
Scorecard

Faisalabad	v	Bahawalpur
273 (83.2 overs); Mohammad Salman 69 (123); Imranullah Aslam 5/83 (24 overs)		279 (84.3 overs); Bilal Khilji 131 (237); Samiullah Khan 5/73 (23.3 overs)
390 (101.1 overs); Khurram Shehzad 117 (188); Kamran Hussain 4/87 (27 overs)		262 (66.2 overs); Kamran Hussain 61 (83); Imran Khalid 4/38 (16.2 overs)

Faisalabad won by 122 runs
Multan Cricket Stadium, Multan
Umpires: Akram Raza and Raweed Khan

- Bahawalpur won the toss and elected to field
- First-class debuts: Rafay Ahmed (Bahawalpur), Bilal Butt and Faisal Yasin (Faisalabad)
- Faisalabad won Six Bottom Teams Final and Bahawalpur is Runner-up as a result of this match

== Super-Eight stage ==
=== Tables ===
Group A
Team	Pld	W	L	T	D	A	Pts
Sialkot	3	1	0	0	2	0	15
Rawalpindi	3	1	1	0	1	0	12
Islamabad	3	0	0	0	3	0	3
Karachi Whites	3	0	1	0	2	0	0

Group B
Team	Pld	W	L	T	D	A	Pts
Karachi Blues	3	3	0	0	0	0	27
Lahore Shalimar	3	1	1	0	1	0	12
Hyderabad	3	0	1	0	2	0	0
Lahore Ravi	3	0	2	0	1	0	0

Legend
The top team advanced to the final

=== Results ===
==== Group A ====
Source:Cricinfo

6–9 February 2013
Scorecard

Islamabad	v	Rawalpindi
196 (69.1 overs); Raheel Majeed 78 (139); Sohail Tanvir 4/47 (17.1 overs)		362 (92.4 overs); Shoaib Ahmed 147 (224); Nasrullah Khan 4/87 (26.4 overs)
		187/4 (51 overs); Umar Amin 63 (99); Nasrullah Khan 1/30 (8 overs)

Match drawn
Rawalpindi Cricket Stadium, Rawalpindi
Umpires: Ghaffar Kazmi and Sajid Afridi

- Islamabad won the toss and elected to field
- No play due to rain on day 1
- Rawalpindi 3 points, Islamabad 0 points

7–10 February 2013
Scorecard

Karachi Whites	v	Sialkot
238 (80 overs); Mohtashim Ali 69 (154); Nayyer Abbas 4/79 (23 overs)		254 (92 overs); Majid Jahangir 57 (114); Atif Maqbool 6/119 (37 overs)
		184/3 (45 overs); Majid Jahangir 101* (146); Mohtashim Ali 1/22 (4 overs)

Match drawn
Diamond Club Ground, Islamabad
Umpires: Akram Raza and Zameer Haider

- Karachi Whites won the toss and elected to field
- No play due to rain on day 1
- Sialkot 3 points, Karachi Whites 0 points

12–15 February 2013
Scorecard

Rawalpindi	v	Karachi Whites
292 (68.2 overs); Awais Zia 67 (121); Abdul Ameer 8/98 (24.2 overs)		69 (29 overs); Shahzaib Hasan 19 (26); Sohail Tanvir 5/20 (10 overs)
		200 (43 overs); Shahzaib Hasan 81 (69); Hammad Azam 7/46 (16 overs)

Rawalpindi won by an innings and 23 runs
Rawalpindi Cricket Stadium, Rawalpindi
Umpires: Akram Raza and Tahir Shah

- Rawalpindi won the toss and elected to field
- Rawalpindi 9 points, Karachi Whites 0 points
- Karachi Whites are eliminated as a result of this match

12–15 February 2013
Scorecard

Islamabad	v	Sialkot
303 (101.3 overs); Raheel Majeed 115 (249); Faisal Rasheed 5/71 (21.3 overs)		377/8 (113.4 overs); Zeeshan Mushtaq 133* (278); Iftikhar Anjum 3/83 (30 overs)

Match drawn
Diamond Club Ground, Islamabad
Umpires: Kamal Merchant and Khalid Mahmood

- Sialkot won the toss and elected to field
- Sialkot 3 points, Islamabad 0 points
- Islamabad is eliminated as a result of this match

18–21 February 2013
Scorecard

Rawalpindi	v	Sialkot
294 (88.2 overs); Umar Amin 75 (138); Bilawal Bhatti 4/71 (20.2)		563/7d (117 overs); Mohammad Ayub Dogar 160 (211); Saad Altaf 3/116 (33 overs)
209 (49 overs); Babar Naeem 71 (93); Shoaib Malik 5/64 (18 overs)

Sialkot won by an innings and 60 runs
Rawalpindi Cricket Stadium, Rawalpindi
Umpires: Khalid Mahmood and Tahir Shah

- Sialkot won the toss and elected to field
- Sialkot 9 points, Rawalpindi 0 points
- Sialkot qualify for the Final and Rawalpindi is eliminated as a result of this match

18–21 February 2013
Scorecard

Islamabad	v	Karachi Whites
414 (129.5 overs); Shan Masood 199 (372); Mohammad Sami 3/78 (25 overs)		209 (67.5 overs); Khalid Latif 59 (116); Iftikhar Anjum 3/31 (14 overs)
		325/5f/o (87.2 overs); Fawad Alam 127 (216); Hamza Nadeem 3/51 (16.2 overs)

Match drawn
Diamond Club Ground, Islamabad
Umpires: Ghaffar Kazmi and Zameer Haider

- Islamabad won the toss and elected to bat
- First-class debut: Qaiser Rehman (Islamabad)
- Islamabad 3 points, Karachi Whites 0 points

==== Group B ====
Source:Cricinfo

6–9 February 2013
Scorecard

Lahore Ravi	v	Lahore Shalimar
153 (48.1 overs); Yasir Ajmal 34* (52); Wahab Riaz 9/59 (20.1 overs)		322 (83.2 overs); Umar Akmal 77 (105); Adnan Rasool 4/117 (30 overs)
255 (53.5 overs); Ahmed Shehzad 66 (56); Mohammad Irfan 3/41 (13 overs)		87/0 (17.5 overs); Imam-ul-Haq 52* (56)

Lahore Shalimar won by 10 wickets
Lahore City Cricket Association Ground, Lahore
Umpires: Riazuddin and Saqib Khan

- Lahore Ravi won the toss and elected to bat
- Wahab Riaz (Lahore Shalimar) took a hat-trick with the wickets of Abid Ali, Ahmed Shehzad, Adnan Akmal
- Lahore Shalimar 9 points, Lahore Ravi 0 points

7–10 February 2013
Scorecard

Hyderabad	v	Karachi Blues
141 (36 overs); Rizwan Ahmed 48 (73); Tariq Haroon 4/24 (10 overs)		205 (80.4 overs); Khurram Manzoor 62 (144); Lal Kumar 5/49 (17.4 overs)
279 (74.4 overs); Sharjeel Khan 101 (80); Akbar-ur-Rehman 2/2 (2 overs)		329 (77.5 overs); Akbar-ur-Rehman 161 (200); Lal Kumar 3/80 (17 overs)

Karachi Blues won by 114 runs
Mirpur Cricket Stadium, Mirpur
Umpires: Raweed Khan and Shozab Raza

- Hyderabad won the toss and elected to field
- First-class debut: Siraj Ahmed (Hyderabad)
- Karachi Blues 9 points, Hyderabad 0 points

12–15 February 2013
Scorecard

Hyderabad	v	Lahore Ravi
584 (120.4 overs); Lal Kumar 109 (123); Mohammad Arshad 5/144 (32.4 overs)		353/5 (94.4 overs); Adnan Akmal 149* (246); Rehan Riaz 3/86 (22.4 overs)

Match drawn
National Ground, Islamabad
Umpires: Sajid Afridi and Saleem Badar

- Lahore Ravi won the toss and elected to field
- First-class debut: Mohammad Arshad (Lahore Ravi)
- Hyderabad (Pakistan) 0 points, Lahore Ravi 0 points
- Hyderabad and Lahore Ravi are eliminated as a result of this match

12–15 February 2013
Scorecard

Lahore Shalimar	v	Karachi Blues
137 (34.4 overs); Mohammad Irfan 62* (75); Zohaib Shera 7/42 (9 overs)		255 (62 overs); Fakhar Zaman 101 (123); Saad Nasim 3/20 (6 overs)
299 (86.4 overs); Saad Nasim 69 (92); Tabish Khan 3/68 (19.4 overs)		182/3 (34.4 overs); Wajihuddin 98 (112); Asif Raza 1/28 (6 overs)

Karachi Blues won by 7 wickets
Lahore City Cricket Association Ground, Lahore
Umpires: Majid Hussain and Nadeem Iqbal

- Karachi Blues won the toss and elected to field
- Karachi Blues 9 points, Lahore Shalimar 0 points

18–21 February 2013
Scorecard

Lahore Ravi	v	Karachi Blues
175 (55.2 overs); Adnan Akmal 56 (84); Tariq Haroon 3/48 (18.3 overs)		265 (67.2 overs); Fakhar Zaman 64 (75); Mohammad Irshad 5/81 (15 overs)
209 (66.4 overs); Jahangir Mirza 70 (127); Anwar Ali 5/61 (19 overs)		121/2 (28.2 overs); Fakhar Zaman 61* (74); Jahangir Mirza 1/12 (1.2 overs)

Karachi Blues won by 8 wickets
Gaddafi Stadium, Lahore
Umpires: Nadeem Iqbal and Sajid Afridi

- Karachi Blues won the toss and elected to field
- Karachi Blues 9 points, Lahore Ravi 0 points
- Karachi Blues qualify for the Final and Lahore Shalimar is eliminated as a result of this match

18–21 February 2013
Scorecard

Lahore Shalimar	v	Hyderabad
473/7d (103 overs); Imran Butt 126 (181); Lal Kumar 3/108 (22 overs)		258 (51 overs); Zahid Mahmood 60* (78); Mohammad Irfan 3/78 (14 overs)
309/4d (50 overs); Imran Butt 81 (95); Imran Chandio 2/50 (10 overs)		28/0 (5.4 overs); Sharjeel Khan 19* (23); Aizaz Cheema 0/6 (3 overs)

Match drawn
Lahore City Cricket Association Ground, Lahore
Umpires: Raweed Khan and Saleem Badar

- Hyderabad won the toss and elected to field
- First-class debuts: Salman Ghafoor and Waqas Saleem (Lahore Shalimar)
- Lahore Shalimar 3 points, Hyderabad (Pakistan) 0 points

=== Final ===
24–28 February 2013
Scorecard

Sialkot	v	Karachi Blues
229 (87.3 overs); Mohammad Ayub Dogar 72 (136); Anwar Ali 4/64 (23 overs)		428 (128.5 overs); Akbar-ur-Rehman 178 (277); Bilawal Bhatti 4/119 (32 overs)
248 (70 overs); Mohammad Ayub Dogar 69 (114); Tariq Haroon 5/74 (23 overs)		51/1 (7.5 overs); Fakhar Zaman 20 (17); Ali Khan 1/22 (3.5 overs)

Karachi Blues won by 9 wickets
Gaddafi Stadium, Lahore
Umpires: Ahsan Raza and Ghaffar Kazmi
Player of the match: Akbar-ur-Rehman (Karachi Blues)

- Karachi Blues won the toss and elected to field
- Karachi Blues won the 2012–13 Quaid-e-Azam Trophy and Sialkot is Runner-up as a result of this match

== Statistics ==
=== Most runs ===
Player	Team	Matches	Innings	Not Outs	Runs	Average	HS	100s	50s
Rizwan Ahmed	Hyderabad	9	16	2	815	58.21	157	5	1
Akbar-ur-Rehman	Karachi Blues	9	14	4	798	79.80	225	2	3
Imran Butt	Lahore Shalimar	9	14	2	740	61.66	126	2	5
Khalid Latif	Karachi Whites	9	15	0	660	44.00	155	3	3
Adnan Akmal	Lahore Ravi	8	11	3	646	80.75	149*	2	5

Last updated 22 February 2013

=== Highest scores ===
Runs	Balls	Player	Team	Opponent	Ground	Date of match
308	429	Imran Farhat	Lahore Ravi	Peshawar	Lahore City Cricket Association Ground	31 January 2013
225	353	Akbar-ur-Rehman	Karachi Blues	Lahore Ravi	Gaddafi Stadium	25 January 2013
210*	418	Ali Asad	Quetta	Peshawar	Arbab Niaz Stadium	14 January 2013
202*	386	Abid Ali	Lahore Ravi	Quetta	Lahore City Cricket Association Ground	8 January 2013
199	372	Shan Masood	Islamabad	Karachi Whites	Diamond Club Ground	18 February 2013

Last updated 22 February 2013

=== Most wickets ===
Player	Team	Matches	Overs	Wickets	Average	BBI	5wi	10wm
Atif Maqbool	Karachi Whites	9	397.1	55	22.45	7/59	7	1
Aizaz Cheema	Lahore Shalimar	9	245.4	43	17.48	6/62	3	1
Tabish Khan	Karachi Blues	9	242.2	34	23.11	5/48	1	0
Adnan Rasool	Lahore Ravi	8	344.0	34	24.73	5/67	3	0
Zulfiqar Babar	Multan	4	262.5	31	21.06	7/67	3	0

Last updated 22 February 2013

=== Best bowling ===
Figures	Overs	Player	Team	Opponent	Ground	Match date
9/59	20.1	Wahab Riaz	Lahore Shalimar	Lahore Ravi	Lahore City Cricket Association Ground	6 February 2013
8/50	18.0	Gohar Faiz	Quetta	Islamabad	Diamond Club Ground	20 January 2013
8/98	24.2	Abdul Ameer	Karachi Whites	Rawalpindi	Rawalpindi Cricket Stadium	12 February 2013
7/40	16.5	Waqas Maqsood	Faisalabad	Abbottabad	Gohati Cricket Stadium	19 January 2013
7/42	9.0	Zohaib Shera	Karachi Blues	Lahore Shalimar	Lahore City Cricket Association Ground	12 February 2013

Last updated 22 February 2013

- Wahab Riaz from Lahore Shalimar took a hat-trick against Lahore Ravi with the wickets of Abid Ali, Ahmed Shehzad and Adnan Akmal
