= 2014–15 Quaid-e-Azam Trophy =

- Dates: 12 October 2014 – 26 December 2014
- Administrator: Pakistan Cricket Board
- Cricket format: First-class
- Tournament format(s): Gold: round-robin and final; Silver: two round-robin groups and knockout
- Host: Pakistan
- Champions: SNG (2nd title)
- Participants: 26 (Gold: 12, Silver: 14)
- Matches: 116 (Gold: 67, Silver: 49)
- Official website: www.pcb.com.pk

The 2014–15 Quaid-e-Azam Trophy was the 57th edition of the Quaid-e-Azam Trophy, the premier domestic first-class cricket competition in Pakistan. It was contested by 26 teams representing 14 regional associations and 12 departments. (Note: The top level of domestic cricket in Pakistan was historically played by teams representing regional cricket associations and departments, which were owned and run by corporations, institutions or government departments.)

The Pakistan Cricket Board made major changes to the structure of the domestic first-class competitions for the 2014–15 season. For the first time in three years, all teams competed in the Quaid-e-Azam Trophy, which was split into two divisions – named as the Gold and Silver leagues; the departments had competed in their own President's Trophy for the previous two seasons. There was also a change to the ball, with Pakistan's Gray's of Cambridge replacing Kookaburra as the competition's supplier.

Sui Northern Gas Pipelines Limited (SNG) won the Quaid-e-Azam Trophy for the second time, defeating National Bank of Pakistan in the final although the match resulted in a draw; SNG had been set a nominal target of 208 runs to win late on the final day, but had only faced 10 overs before the game ended. They secured the title by virtue of having amassing a 301-run lead in the first innings.

== Format ==
The structure of the domestic first-class cricket in Pakistan changed significantly for the 2014–15 season, with both regional associations and departments competing in the Quaid-e-Azam Trophy for the first time since 2011–12. The format of the competition also changed, reintroducing a two tier Gold and Silver League system with promotion and relegation.

The top six associations and departments from the Quaid-e-Azam Trophy and President's Trophy in 2013–14 were placed in the Gold League, and the remaining eight associations and six departments were placed in the Silver League. The Gold League was a played as a single round-robin group with a final contested between the two top teams at the end of the season. Teams in the Silver League were divided into two round-robin groups, with the leading four from each advancing to a knockout phase to determine the winner.

Promotions and relegations were rendered moot as the Quaid-e-Azam Trophy underwent further restructuring prior to the 2015–16 season.

== Gold League ==
=== Group stage ===
Team	Pld	W	L	T	D	A	Pts
Sui Northern Gas Pipelines Limited (Q)	11	8	1	0	2	0	72
National Bank of Pakistan (Q)	11	6	1	0	4	0	65
Port Qasim Authority	11	6	1	0	4	0	59
Water and Power Development Authority	11	5	2	0	4	0	45
United Bank Limited	11	4	3	0	4	0	44
Karachi Dolphins	11	4	4	0	3	0	44
Islamabad Leopards	11	4	2	0	5	0	42
Rawalpindi Rams	11	4	4	0	3	0	36
Peshawar Panthers	11	2	7	0	2	0	25
Lahore Lions	11	2	8	0	1	0	21
Zarai Taraqiati Bank (R)	11	2	5	0	4	0	19
Multan Tigers (R)	11	0	9	0	2	0	3

(Q) The top two teams advanced to the final
(R) The lowest ranked region and department would have been relegated to the Silver League for the following season (Note: Further restructuring of the competition by the Pakistan Cricket Board meant that any promotions and relegations were rendered moot.)

Position determined by total points, most matches won, fewest matches lost, followed by adjusted net run rate (matches with no result, i.e. those where both teams did not complete their first innings, were disregarded); matches finishing in a draw were decided on first innings scores, with points awarded as follows:
- Win by an innings = 10 points
- Win having led on first innings = 9 points
- Win having tied or trailed on first innings = 6 points
- Tie having led on first innings = 5 points
- Draw having led on first innings = 3 points
- Draw having tied on first innings, or tie having trailed on first innings = 2 points
- Draw with no result on first innings, or abandoned without a ball bowled = 1 point
- Loss, or draw having trailed on first innings = 0 points

=== Final ===
22–26 December 2014
Scorecard

National Bank of Pakistan	v	Sui Northern Gas Pipelines Limited
242 (93.4 overs); Mohammad Nawaz 76 (139); Manzoor Khan 5/43 (21.4 overs)		543 (173.0 overs); Mohammad Rizwan 224 (399); Fawad Alam 3/33 (12.0 overs)
508 (160.3 overs); Kamran Akmal 137 (168); Imran Ali 5/85 (30.0 overs)		28/0 (10.0 overs); Khurram Shahzad 17* (32); Fawad Alam 0/8 (5.0 overs)

Sui Northern Gas Pipelines Limited won on first innings lead
National Stadium, Karachi
Umpires: Ahsan Raza and Shozab Raza
Player of the match: Anwar Khan

- Sui Northern Gas Pipelines Limited won the toss and elected to bat.

== Silver League ==
=== Group stage ===
Group I
Team	Pld	W	L	T	D	A	Pts
Pakistan Int'l Airlines (Q)	6	6	0	0	2	0	52
Khan Research Labs. (Q)	6	4	1	0	1	0	34
Pakistan Television (Q)	6	3	2	0	1	0	28
Hyderabad Hawks (Q)	6	2	3	0	1	0	18
Karachi Zebras	6	2	3	0	1	0	15
Lahore Eagles	6	0	4	0	2	0	6
Quetta Bears	6	0	4	0	2	0	3

Group II
Team	Pld	W	L	T	D	A	Pts
Habib Bank Ltd. (Q)	6	4	1	0	1	0	42
Sui Southern Gas Corp. (Q)	6	3	1	0	2	0	34
State Bank of Pakistan (Q)	6	2	1	0	3	0	28
Bahawalpur Stags (Q)	6	1	1	0	4	0	16
Sialkot Stallions	6	1	2	0	3	0	6
Faisalabad Wolves	6	1	3	0	2	0	6
Abbottabad Falcons	6	0	3	0	3	0	3

(Q) The top four teams in each group advanced to the knockout stage

Position determined by total points, most matches won, fewest matches lost, followed by adjusted net run rate (matches with no result, i.e. those where both teams did not complete their first innings, were disregarded); matches finishing in a draw were decided on first innings scores, with points awarded as follows:
- Win by an innings = 10 points
- Win having led on first innings = 9 points
- Win having tied or trailed on first innings = 6 points
- Tie having led on first innings = 5 points
- Draw having led on first innings = 3 points
- Draw having tied on first innings, or tie having trailed on first innings = 2 points
- Draw with no result on first innings, or abandoned without a ball bowled = 1 point
- Loss, or draw having trailed on first innings = 0 points

=== Knockout stage ===
Quarter-finals
II–1	Habib Bank Limited	138 & 423/5d.
I–4	Hyderabad Hawks	266 & 267
I–3	Pakistan Television	222 & 182
II–2	Sui Southern Gas Corporation	266 & 373
I–1	Pakistan International Airlines	104 & 132/4
II–4	Bahawalpur Stags	137 & 96
I–2	Khan Research Laboratories	176 & 171
II–3	State Bank of Pakistan	394

Semi-finals
Habib Bank Limited	417 & 201/4
Sui Southern Gas Corporation	415
Pakistan International Airlines	120 & 279
State Bank of Pakistan	172 & 229/7

Final
Habib Bank Limited	356 & 211/7
State Bank of Pakistan	162 & 527/8d.

==== Quarter-finals ====
23–26 November 2014
Scorecard

Bahawalpur Stags	v	Pakistan International Airlines
137 (38.5 overs); Moinuddin 49 (93); Kamran Sajid 4/14 (9.5 overs)		104 (41.1 overs); Fahad Iqbal 27 (83); Ansar Javed 4/32 (16.0 overs)
96 (38.0 overs); Faisal Mubashir 29 (55); Kamran Sajid 4/24 (9.0 overs)		132/4 (36.2 overs); Fahad Iqbal 52 (55); Zahir Siddiqi 3/46 (14.0 overs)

Pakistan International Airlines won by 6 wickets
Jinnah Stadium, Sialkot
Umpires: Javed Ashraf and Ijaz Ahmed

- Pakistan Airlines won the toss and elected to field.

23–26 November 2014
Scorecard

Habib Bank Limited	v	Hyderabad Hawks
128 (43.1 overs); Rameez Aziz 49 (117); Mir Ali 5/39 (15.0 overs)		266 (73.2 overs); Naeem-ur-Rehman 43 (39); Ashiq Ali 4/60 (15.0 overs)
423/5 dec. (86.1 overs); Bilal Shafayat 201 (257); Babar Khan 2/103 (17.1 overs)		267 (66.4 overs); Azeem Ghumman 201 (257); Umar Gul 3/64 (18.4 overs)

Habib Bank Limited won by 18 runs
Mirpur Cricket Stadium, Mirpur
Umpires: Riazuddin and Majid Hussain

- Hyderabad Hawks won the toss and elected to field.

23–26 November 2014
Scorecard

Khan Research Laboratories	v	State Bank of Pakistan
176 (59.4 overs); Nauman Ali 36 (54); Zafar Gohar 4/30 (10.4 overs)		394 (120.4 overs); Usman Salahuddin 154 (332); Usama Mir 4/133 (34.0 overs)
171 (48.1 overs); Ali Khan 73 (112); Kashif Bhatti 4/45 (11.0 overs)

State Bank of Pakistan won by an innings and 47 runs
Iqbal Stadium, Faisalabad
Umpires: Khalid Mahmood Sr. and Nasar Khan

- State Bank of Pakistan won the toss and elected to field.

23–26 November 2014
Scorecard

Sui Southern Gas Corporation	v	Pakistan Television
266 (72.3 overs); Usman Tariq 64 (161); Waqar Ahmed 5/53 (15.0 overs)		222 (67.5 overs); Hasan Raza 59 (135); Atif Maqbool 6/82 (23.5 overs)
373 (90.1 overs); Awais Zia 79 (102); Nawaz Ahmed 3/60 (22.0 overs)		182 (41.0 overs); Rehan Afridi 70 (70); Tabish Khan 5/55 (14.0 overs)

Sui Southern Gas Company won by 235 runs
National Ground, Islamabad
Umpires: Naushad Khan and Hakeem Shah

- Sui Southern Gas Company won the toss and elected to bat.

==== Semi-finals ====
28 November–1 December 2014
Scorecard

Pakistan International Airlines	v	State Bank of Pakistan
120 (33.1 overs); Shoaib Khan 22 (47); Rizwan Haider 6/57 (16.1 overs)		172 (53.0 overs); Naved Yasin* 55 (78); Ali Imran 4/40 (11.0 overs)
279 (77.1 overs); Fahad Iqbal 93 (169); Rizwan Haider 5/101 (28.0 overs)		229/7 (69.2); Usman Salahuddin* 82 (166); Ali Imran 6/47 (21.0 overs)

State Bank of Pakistan won by 3 wickets
Jinnah Stadium, Sialkot
Umpires: Javed Ashraf and Mohammad Sajid

- State Bank of Pakistan won the toss and elected to field.

28 November–1 December 2014
Scorecard

Habib Bank Limited	v	Sui Southern Gas Corporation
417 (121.3 overs); Rameez Aziz 169 (251); Atif Maqbool 3/94 (33 overs)		415 (122.2 overs); Asif Zakir 204* (374); Kamran Hussain 4/89 (24.2 overs)
201/4 (48 overs); Rameez Aziz 78 (125); Tabish Khan 2/63 (16 overs)

Match drawn; Habib Bank Limited won on first innings
Mirpur Cricket Stadium, Mirpur
Umpires: Mohammad Asif, Riazuddin

- Sui Southern Gas Company won the toss and elected to field.

==== Final ====
3–7 December 2014
Scorecard

State Bank of Pakistan	v	Habib Bank Limited
162 (40.4 overs); Aamer Yamin 54 (43); Abdur Rehman 4/35 (15.0 overs)		356 (128.2 overs); Kamran Hussain 76 (159); Kashif Bhatti 5/113 (44.0 overs)
527/8 dec. (152.5 overs); Babar Azam 266 (435); Abdur Rehman 4/222 (64.5 overs)		211/7 (114.0 overs); Imran Farhat 80 (217); Kashif Bhatti 4/74 (44.0 overs)

Habib Bank Limited won on first innings lead
Iqbal Stadium, Faisalabad
Umpires: Mohammad Asif and Riazuddin
Player of the match: Babar Azam

- State Bank of Pakistan won the toss and elected to bat.
