= 2013–14 Quaid-e-Azam Trophy =

- Dates: 23 October 2013 – 30 January 2014
- Administrator(s): Pakistan Cricket Board
- Cricket format: First-class
- Tournament format(s): Two round-robin group stages and final
- Host(s): Pakistan
- Champions: Rawalpindi (1st title)
- Participants: 14
- Matches: 61
- Official website: www.pcb.com.pk

The 2013–14 Quaid-e-Azam Trophy was one of two first-class domestic cricket competitions that were held in Pakistan during the 2013–14 cricket season. It was the 56th edition of the Quaid-e-Azam Trophy, and was contested by fourteen teams representing regional cricket associations. (Note: The top level of domestic cricket in Pakistan was historically played by teams representing regional cricket associations and departments, which were owned and run by corporations, institutions or government departments.) It ran concurrently with the President's Trophy, which was contested by ten departmental teams.

Rawalpindi won the Quaid-e-Azam Trophy for the first time, defeating Islamabad in the final.

== Format ==
The format of the Quaid-e-Azam Trophy remained unchanged from the previous season, with the fourteen regional teams divided into two groups. After a series of round-robin matches, the top four teams from each group proceeded to the Super-Eight stage of the competition, with the remaining six teams entering the "bottom six stage". In both final stages, the teams were split into two groups for a further set of round-robin matches, after which the final was contested by the top team from each Super-Eight group.

Unlike the previous season, no departmental players were available and as a result the standing of the Quaid-e-Azam Trophy was diminished, with the President's Trophy being considered the "premier first-class tournament" in 2013–14.

=== Standings and points ===
Positions in the tables were determined by total points, most matches won, fewest matches lost, followed by adjusted net run rate (matches with no result, i.e. those where both teams did not complete their first innings, were disregarded); matches finishing in a draw were decided on first innings scores, with points awarded as follows:

- Win having led on first innings = 9 points
- Win having tied or trailed on first innings = 6 points
- Tie having led on first innings = 5 points
- Draw having led on first innings = 3 points
- Draw having tied on first innings, or tie having trailed on first innings = 2 points
- Loss, draw having trailed or with no result on first innings, or abandoned without a ball bowled = 0 points

== Team locations ==
Locations of teams in 2013–14 Quaid-e-Azam Trophy

== Group stage ==
=== Tables ===
Group I
Team	Pld	W	L	T	D	A	Pts
Rawalpindi	6	4	0	0	2	0	38
Peshawar	6	3	0	0	3	0	35
Sialkot	6	2	1	0	3	0	23
Karachi Blues	6	2	2	0	2	0	19
Abbottabad	6	0	1	0	5	0	9
Lahore Ravi	6	0	3	0	3	0	6
Bahawalpur	6	0	4	0	2	0	3

Group II
Team	Pld	W	L	T	D	A	Pts
Karachi Whites	6	4	0	0	2	0	44
Lahore Shalimar	6	3	2	0	1	0	30
Islamabad	6	3	1	0	2	0	25
Multan	6	2	3	0	1	0	19
Faisalabad	6	1	2	0	3	0	18
Quetta	6	1	3	0	2	0	9
Hyderabad	6	0	3	0	3	0	6

Legend
Top four teams advanced to the Super-Eight stage
Bottom three teams entered the Bottom six stage

== Bottom six stage ==
=== Tables ===
Pool A
Team	Pld	W	L	T	D	A	Pts
Hyderabad	2	1	0	0	1	0	10
Faisalabad	2	0	0	0	2	0	4
Lahore Ravi	2	0	1	0	1	0	0

Pool B
Team	Pld	W	L	T	D	A	Pts
Bahawalpur	2	1	0	0	1	0	13
Quetta	2	1	0	0	1	0	6
Abbottabad	2	0	1	0	1	0	0

Legend
The top team advanced to the final

== Super-Eight stage ==
=== Tables ===
Group A
Team	Pld	W	L	T	D	A	Pts
Islamabad	3	1	0	0	2	0	10
Peshawar	3	1	1	0	1	0	9
Karachi Whites	3	1	2	0	0	0	9
Karachi Blues	3	1	1	0	1	0	9

Group B
Team	Pld	W	L	T	D	A	Pts
Rawalpindi	3	1	0	0	2	0	9
Lahore Shalimar	3	0	0	0	3	0	9
Multan	3	0	0	0	3	0	6
Sialkot	3	0	1	0	2	0	0

Legend
The top team advanced to the final

=== Final ===
26–30 January 2014
Scorecard

Rawalpindi	v	Islamabad
211 (86.4 overs); Awais Zia 76 (185); Junaid Nadir 4/49 (23.2 overs)		175 (64.4 overs); Afaq Raheem 85 (158); Nasir Malik 4/68 (23.4 overs)
398 (122.3 overs); Nasir Malik 177 (296); Mudassar Ali 3/48 (29 overs)		206 (64.5 overs); Imad Wasim 49 (100); Akhtar Ayub 5/67 (19 overs)

Rawalpindi won by 228 runs
Gaddafi Stadium, Lahore
Umpires: Shozab Raza and Zameer Haider
Player of the match: Shoaib Nasir (Rawalpindi)

- Islamabad won the toss and elected to field
- Rawalpindi won the 2013–14 Quaid-e-Azam Trophy
