= 2013–14 President's Trophy =

President's Trophy 2013–14
- Dates: 23 October 2013 – 15 March 2014
- Administrator: Pakistan Cricket Board
- Cricket format: First-class cricket (4 days)
- Tournament format(s): Round-robin and final
- Host: Pakistan
- Champions: Sui Northern Gas Pipelines (2nd title)
- Participants: 11
- Matches: 56
- Most runs: Abid Ali (850)
- Most wickets: Atif Maqbool (57)
- Official website: http://www.pcb.com.pk

The 2013–14 President's Trophy was one of two first-class cricket competitions that were held in Pakistan during the 2013–14 season, the other being the Quaid-e-Azam Trophy. It was the second edition of the President's Trophy.

It was contested by eleven departmental teams (Note: Cricket in Pakistan is played by teams representing associations or regions and departments; departmental teams are affiliated to corporations, institutions or government departments.), one more than the previous season with the addition of Pakistan Television who had won the previous season's Patron's Trophy Grade-II competition. Each team played ten 4-day matches in a round-robin league phase between 23 October 2013 and 22 January 2014, with the top two teams contesting the final on 12–15 March 2014.

Sui Northern Gas Pipelines Limited defended the title, winning six of their nine group matches and beating United Bank Limited, who had topped the group stage having finished in last place the previous season, in the final.

== Group stage ==
=== Points Table ===
Team	Pld	W	L	T	D	NR	Pts
United Bank Limited	10	7	2	0	1	0	60
Sui Northern Gas Pipelines	10	6	1	0	3	0	58
National Bank of Pakistan	10	5	0	0	5	0	53
Water and Power Development Authority	10	4	3	0	3	0	40
Zarai Taraqiati Bank	10	3	4	0	3	0	31
Port Qasim Authority	10	2	5	0	3	0	28
Pakistan International Airlines	10	3	4	0	3	0	27
Habib Bank Limited	10	2	3	0	5	0	27
Khan Research Laboratories	10	1	3	0	6	0	27
State Bank of Pakistan	10	2	5	0	3	0	16
Pakistan Television	10	2	7	0	1	0	15

The order in the table is determined by total points, followed by number of matches won, then fewest matches lost.

Points Allocation
- Win = 9 points
- Win by an innings = 10 points
- Win after being behind or tied on 1st innings = 6 points
- Tie after leading on 1st innings = 5 points
- Tie after being behind on 1st innings = 2 points
- Draw after leading on 1st innings = 3 points
- Draw after being tied on 1st innings = 2 points
- Draw after being behind on 1st innings = 0 points
- Abandoned without any play or no decision on 1st innings = 1 point

== Final ==
12–15 March 2014
Scorecard

Sui Northern Gas Pipelines	v	United Bank Limited
386 (all out, 147.1 overs); Naeemuddin 192 (429); Atif Maqbool 4/84 (33.1 overs)		144 (all out, 56.2 overs); Abid Ali 51 (151); Yasir Shah 5/41 (18.2 overs)
262 for 8 (declared, 80.1 overs); Adnan Akmal 99 (146); Tariq Haroon 3/54 (21 overs)		226 (all out, 50.2 overs); Wajihuddin 57 (91); Tariq Haroon 57 (70); Yasir Shah 4/48 (16.2 overs)

Sui Northern Gas Pipelines Limited won by 278 runs
Multan Cricket Stadium, Multan
Umpires: Mussadaq Rasool and Ahmed Shahab
Player of the match: Naeemuddin (Sui Northern Gas Pipelines Limited)

- United Bank Limited won the toss and elected to field
