= Ansar Javed =

Pakistani cricketer

Personal information
- Full name: Ansar Javed
- Born: 23 October 1980 (age 46); Tibbi Lal Beg, Punjab, Pakistan
- Batting: Right-handed
- Bowling: Left-arm fast-medium
- Role: Bowler

Domestic team information
- Years: Team
- 2007/08–2009/10: Multan
- 2007/08: State Bank of Pakistan
- 2012/13–2014/15: Bahawalpur Stags

Career statistics
Competition	First-class	List A	Twenty20
Matches	38	19	11
Runs scored	823	134	100
Batting average	17.14	14.88	20.00
100s/50s	0/1	0/0	0/0
Top score	59*	38*	35*
Balls bowled	5,317	621	126
Wickets	104	12	1
Bowling average	27.76	43.83	149.00
5 wickets in innings	2	0	0
10 wickets in match	0	0	0
Best bowling	6/34	2/28	1/12
Catches/stumpings	18/–	7/–	3/–
- Source: Cricinfo, 14 April 2026

Ansar Javed (born 23 October 1980) is a Pakistani cricket coach and former cricketer. Javed was a right-handed batsman who bowls left-arm fast-medium. He was born in Tibbi Lal Beg, Punjab.

Javed made his first-class debut for Multan against Faisalabad in the 2007–08 Quaid-e-Azam Trophy. He made his List A debut for Multan Tigers against Hyderabad Hawks in the 2007–08 ABN-AMRO Cup in March 2008, and made his Twenty20 debut for the Tigers against Sialkot Stallions in May 2009. He later played domestic cricket for State Bank of Pakistan and Bahawalpur, with his final senior appearances coming for Bahawalpur Stags in the 2014/15 season.

One of Javed's earliest notable performances came in the final of the 2007–08 Patron's Trophy Grade-II, when he scored 89 for State Bank of Pakistan and also took 4 wickets for 58 runs in Port Qasim Authority's second innings. In February 2012, playing for Bahawalpur in the Bottom Six stage of the 2011–12 Quaid-e-Azam Trophy, he made 41 against Peshawar.

By the 2014/15 season, Javed was a regular member of the Bahawalpur Stags side. In November 2014, he reached 100 first-class wickets while taking 4 wickets for 21 runs against Pakistan International Airlines in the quarter-finals of the Silver League of the Quaid-e-Azam Trophy. The following year, in the 2014–15 One Day Cup, he took 2 wickets for 28 runs as the Stags beat Sialkot Stallions by one wicket to reach the next round.

Javed played 38 first-class matches. In these, he took 104 wickets at a bowling average of 27.76, with best figures of 6/34 and 2 five-wicket hauls.
