= 2013 Champions League Twenty20 squads =

This is a list of the squads that qualified for the 2013 Champions League Twenty20.

== Brisbane Heat ==
No.	Player	Nat	Date of birth	Batting	Bowling style
39	James Hopes (c)	(Australia)	24 October 1978 (aged 34)	Right	Right-arm medium
62	Joe Burns	(Australia)	6 September 1989 (aged 24)	Right	Right-arm medium
54	Daniel Christian	(Australia)	4 May 1983 (aged 30)	Right	Right-arm fast-medium
31	Ben Cutting	(Australia)	30 January 1987 (aged 26)	Right	Right-arm fast-medium
0	Peter Forrest	(Australia)	15 November 1985 (aged 27)	Right	Right-arm medium
—	Dom Michael	(Australia)	8 October 1987 (aged 25)	Left	Right-arm medium-fast
18	Chris Hartley (wk)	(Australia)	24 May 1982 (aged 31)	Left	—
43	Nathan Hauritz	(Australia)	18 October 1981 (aged 31)	Right	Right-arm off break
32	Matthew Gale	(Australia)	28 November 1983 (aged 29)	Right	Right-arm fast-medium
50	Chris Lynn	(Australia)	10 April 1990 (aged 23)	Right	Slow left arm orthodox
8	Alister McDermott	(Australia)	7 June 1991 (aged 22)	Right	Right-arm fast-medium
—	Cameron Gannon	(Australia)	23 January 1989 (aged 24)	Right	Right-arm fast-medium
—	Alex Kemp	(Australia)	2 December 1988 (aged 24)	Right	Right-arm medium
24	Kemar Roach	(Barbados)	30 June 1988 (aged 25)	Right	Right-arm fast
22	Chris Sabburg	(Australia)	2 January 1990 (aged 23)	Left	Right-arm off break

== Chennai Super Kings ==
No.	Player	Nat	Date of birth	Batting	Bowling style
7	Mahendra Singh Dhoni (c & wk)	(India)	7 July 1981 (aged 32)	Right	Right-arm medium
3	Suresh Raina	(India)	27 November 1986 (aged 26)	Left	Right-arm off break
8	Murali Vijay	(India)	1 April 1984 (aged 29)	Right	Right-arm off break
6	Wriddhiman Saha	(India)	24 October 1984 (aged 28)	Right	—
99	Ravichandran Ashwin	(India)	17 September 1986 (aged 27)	Right	Right-arm off break
33	Subramaniam Badrinath	(India)	30 August 1980 (aged 33)	Right	Right-arm off break
—	Imtiyaz Ahmed	(India)	10 November 1985 (aged 27)	Right	Right-arm medium
12	Ravindra Jadeja	(India)	6 December 1988 (aged 24)	Left	Slow left arm orthodox
18	Mohit Sharma	(India)	18 September 1988 (aged 24)	Right	Right-arm medium
48	Michael Hussey	(Australia)	27 May 1975 (aged 38)	Left	Right-arm medium
47	Dwayne Bravo	(Trinidad and Tobago)	7 October 1983 (aged 29)	Right	Right-arm medium-fast
81	Albie Morkel	(South Africa)	10 June 1981 (aged 32)	Left	Right-arm medium-fast
98	Jason Holder	(Barbados)	5 November 1991 (aged 21)	Right	Right-arm medium-fast
18	Faf du Plessis	(South Africa)	13 July 1984 (aged 29)	Right	Leg break
20	Chris Morris	(South Africa)	30 April 1987 (aged 26)	Right	Right-arm fast-medium

== Faisalabad Wolves ==
No.	Player	Nat	Date of birth	Batting	Bowling style
22	Misbah-ul-Haq (c)	(Pakistan)	28 May 1974 (aged 39)	Right	Leg break
13	Asif Ali	(Pakistan)	1 October 1991 (aged 21)	Right	Right-arm medium-fast
98	Ali Waqas	(Pakistan)	26 December 1989 (aged 23)	Left	Right-arm off break
6	Khurram Shehzad	(Pakistan)	19 January 1982 (aged 31)	Right	—
5	Mohammad Salman (wk)	(Pakistan)	7 August 1981 (aged 32)	Right	Leg break
—	Waqas Maqsood	(Pakistan)	4 November 1987 (aged 25)	Left	Left-arm fast-medium
56	Samiullah Khan	(Pakistan)	4 August 1982 (aged 31)	Right	Left-arm medium-fast
72	Asad Ali	(Pakistan)	14 October 1988 (aged 24)	Right	Right-arm medium-fast
50	Saeed Ajmal	(Pakistan)	14 October 1977 (aged 35)	Right	Right-arm off break
91	Ehsan Adil	(Pakistan)	15 March 1993 (aged 20)	Right	Right-arm fast-medium
—	Hasan Mahmood	(Pakistan)	11 May 1988 (aged 25)	Right	Right-arm off break
—	Jahandad Khan	(Pakistan)	4 April 1983 (aged 30)	Right	—
—	Farrukh Shehzad	(Pakistan)	12 October 1984 (aged 28)	Right	Right-arm medium-fast
17	Imran Khalid	(Pakistan)	29 December 1982 (aged 30)	Left	Slow left arm orthodox
8	Ammar Mahmood	(Pakistan)	4 April 1979 (aged 34)	Right	Right-arm off break

== Highveld Lions ==
No.	Player	Nat	Date of birth	Batting	Bowling style
73	Alviro Petersen (c)	(South Africa)	25 November 1980 (aged 32)	Right	Right-arm off break
—	Temba Bavuma	(South Africa)	17 May 1990 (aged 23)	Right	Right-arm medium
—	Gulam Bodi	(South Africa)	4 January 1979 (aged 34)	Left	Slow left-arm wrist-spin
12	Quinton de Kock (wk)	(South Africa)	17 December 1992 (aged 20)	Left	—
44	Neil McKenzie	(South Africa)	24 November 1975 (aged 37)	Right	Right-arm medium
68	Lonwabo Tsotsobe	(South Africa)	7 March 1984 (aged 29)	Right	Left-arm fast-medium
—	Ethan O'Reilly	(South Africa)	27 December 1985 (aged 27)	Right	Right-arm fast
7	Hardus Viljoen	(South Africa)	6 March 1989 (aged 24)	Right	Right-arm fast-medium
72	Rassie van der Dussen	(South Africa)	7 February 1989 (aged 24)	Right	Leg break
69	Aaron Phangiso	(South Africa)	21 January 1984 (aged 29)	Right	Slow left arm orthodox
29	Dwaine Pretorius	(South Africa)	29 March 1989 (aged 24)	Right	Right-arm medium-fast
86	Jean Symes	(South Africa)	13 November 1986 (aged 26)	Left	Slow left arm orthodox
1	Imran Tahir	(South Africa)	27 March 1979 (aged 34)	Right	Leg break googly
33	Sohail Tanvir	(Pakistan)	12 December 1984 (aged 28)	Left	Left-arm medium-fast
—	Thami Tsolekile	(South Africa)	9 October 1980 (aged 32)	Right	Right-arm off break

== Kandurata Maroons ==
No.	Player	Nat	Date of birth	Batting	Bowling style
66	Lahiru Thirimanne (c)	(Sri Lanka)	8 September 1989 (aged 24)	Left	Right-arm medium-fast
—	Dhananjaya de Silva	(Sri Lanka)	6 September 1991 (aged 22)	Right	Right-arm off break
29	Lahiru Jayaratne	(Sri Lanka)	12 October 1991 (aged 21)	Right	Right-arm medium-fast
34	Shehan Jayasuriya	(Sri Lanka)	12 September 1991 (aged 22)	Left	Right-arm off break
37	Dilhara Lokuhettige	(Sri Lanka)	3 July 1980 (aged 33)	Right	Right-arm fast-medium
25	Thilina Kandamby	(Sri Lanka)	4 June 1982 (aged 31)	Left	Leg break
92	Nuwan Kulasekara	(Sri Lanka)	22 July 1982 (aged 31)	Right	Right-arm fast-medium
2	Kaushal Lokuarachchi	(Sri Lanka)	20 May 1982 (aged 31)	Right	Leg break
40	Ajantha Mendis	(Sri Lanka)	11 March 1985 (aged 28)	Right	Right-arm off break
—	Dhammika Prasad	(Sri Lanka)	30 May 1983 (aged 30)	Right	Right-arm fast-medium
88	Suraj Randiv	(Sri Lanka)	30 January 1985 (aged 28)	Right	Right-arm off break
11	Kumar Sangakkara (wk)	(Sri Lanka)	27 October 1977 (aged 35)	Left	Right-arm off break
5	Chamara Silva	(Sri Lanka)	14 December 1979 (aged 33)	Right	Leg break
84	Milinda Siriwardana	(Sri Lanka)	4 December 1985 (aged 27)	Left	Slow left arm orthodox
44	Upul Tharanga	(Sri Lanka)	2 February 1985 (aged 28)	Left	—

== Mumbai Indians ==
No.	Player	Nat	Date of birth	Batting	Bowling style
45	Rohit Sharma (c)	(India)	30 April 1987 (aged 26)	Right	Right-arm off break
14	Abu Nechim	(India)	5 November 1988 (aged 24)	Right	Right-arm medium-fast
18	Nathan Coulter-Nile	(Australia)	11 October 1987 (aged 25)	Right	Right-arm fast
1	Rishi Dhawan	(India)	19 February 1990 (aged 23)	Right	Right-arm medium-fast
3	Harbhajan Singh	(India)	3 July 1980 (aged 33)	Right	Right-arm off break
25	Mitchell Johnson	(Australia)	2 November 1981 (aged 31)	Left	Left-arm fast
19	Dinesh Karthik (wk)	(India)	1 June 1985 (aged 28)	Right	—
28	Glenn Maxwell	(Australia)	14 October 1988 (aged 24)	Right	Right-arm off break
30	Pragyan Ojha	(India)	5 September 1986 (aged 27)	Left	Slow left arm orthodox
—	Akshar Patel	(India)	20 January 1994 (aged 19)	Left	Slow left arm orthodox
55	Kieron Pollard	(Trinidad and Tobago)	12 May 1987 (aged 26)	Right	Right-arm medium-fast
9	Ambati Rayudu	(India)	23 September 1985 (aged 27)	Right	Right-arm off break
50	Dwayne Smith	(Barbados)	12 April 1983 (aged 30)	Right	Right-arm medium
27	Aditya Tare	(India)	7 November 1987 (aged 25)	Right	—
10	Sachin Tendulkar	(India)	24 April 1973 (aged 40)	Right	Right-arm off break

== Otago Volts ==
No.	Player	Nat	Date of birth	Batting	Bowling style
42	Brendon McCullum (c)	(New Zealand)	27 September 1981 (aged 31)	Right	Right-arm medium
90	Nick Beard	(New Zealand)	16 September 1989 (aged 24)	Left	Slow left arm orthodox
—	Michael Bracewell	(New Zealand)	14 February 1991 (aged 22)	Left	—
4	Neil Broom	(New Zealand)	20 November 1983 (aged 29)	Right	Right-arm medium
6	Ian Butler	(New Zealand)	24 November 1981 (aged 31)	Right	Right-arm fast
—	Mark Craig	(New Zealand)	23 March 1987 (aged 26)	Left	Right-arm off break
14	Derek de Boorder (wk)	(New Zealand)	25 October 1985 (aged 27)	Right	—
—	Jacob Duffy	(New Zealand)	2 August 1994 (aged 19)	Right	Right-arm fast-medium
8	Nathan McCullum	(New Zealand)	1 September 1980 (aged 33)	Right	Right-arm off break
15	James McMillan	(New Zealand)	14 June 1978 (aged 35)	Right	Right-arm fast-medium
5	Jimmy Neesham	(New Zealand)	17 September 1990 (aged 23)	Left	Right-arm medium
—	Aaron Redmond	(New Zealand)	23 September 1979 (aged 33)	Right	Leg break
17	Hamish Rutherford	(New Zealand)	27 April 1989 (aged 24)	Left	—
27	Ryan ten Doeschate	(Netherlands)	30 June 1980 (aged 33)	Right	Right-arm medium-fast
11	Neil Wagner	(New Zealand)	13 March 1986 (aged 27)	Left	Left-arm medium-fast

== Perth Scorchers ==
No.	Player	Nat	Date of birth	Batting	Bowling style
37	Simon Katich (c)	(Australia)	21 August 1975 (aged 38)	Left	Slow left-arm wrist-spin
18	Ashton Agar	(Australia)	14 October 1993 (aged 19)	Left	Slow left arm orthodox
19	Michael Beer	(Australia)	9 June 1984 (aged 29)	Right	Slow left arm orthodox
5	Jason Behrendorff	(Australia)	20 April 1990 (aged 23)	Right	Left-arm fast-medium
35	Hilton Cartwright	(Australia)	4 February 1992 (aged 21)	Right	Right-arm medium
—	Burt Cockley	(Australia)	3 April 1986 (aged 27)	Right	Right-arm fast-medium
1	Liam Davis	(Australia)	2 August 1984 (aged 29)	Right	Right-arm fast-medium
31	Brad Hogg	(Australia)	6 February 1971 (aged 42)	Left	Slow left-arm wrist-spin
15	Joe Mennie	(Australia)	24 December 1988 (aged 24)	Right	Right-arm fast-medium
26	Marcus North	(Australia)	28 July 1979 (aged 34)	Left	Right-arm off break
3	Joel Paris	(Australia)	11 December 1992 (aged 20)	Left	Left-arm fast-medium
8	Tom Triffitt (wk)	(Australia)	13 November 1990 (aged 22)	Right	—
17	Ashton Turner	(Australia)	25 January 1993 (aged 20)	Right	Right-arm off break
32	Adam Voges	(Australia)	4 October 1979 (aged 33)	Right	Slow left arm orthodox
9	Sam Whiteman	(Australia)	19 March 1992 (aged 21)	Left	—

== Rajasthan Royals ==
No.	Player	Nat	Date of birth	Batting	Bowling style
19	Rahul Dravid (c)	(India)	11 January 1973 (aged 40)	Right	Right-arm off break
84	Stuart Binny	(India)	3 June 1984 (aged 29)	Right	Right-arm medium
90	Kevon Cooper	(Trinidad and Tobago)	2 February 1989 (aged 24)	Right	Right-arm medium
44	James Faulkner	(Australia)	29 April 1990 (aged 23)	Right	Left-arm fast
7	Brad Hodge	(Australia)	29 December 1974 (aged 38)	Right	Right-arm off break
5	Vikramjeet Malik	(India)	9 May 1983 (aged 30)	Right	Right-arm medium
1	Ashok Menaria	(India)	29 October 1990 (aged 22)	Left	Slow left arm orthodox
3	Ajinkya Rahane	(India)	5 June 1988 (aged 25)	Right	Right-arm medium
9	Sanju Samson	(India)	11 November 1994 (aged 18)	Right	—
6	Rahul Shukla	(India)	28 August 1990 (aged 23)	Right	Right-arm medium
32	Shaun Tait	(Australia)	22 February 1983 (aged 30)	Right	Right-arm fast
2	Pravin Tambe	(India)	8 October 1971 (aged 41)	Right	Leg break
37	Siddharth Trivedi	(India)	4 September 1982 (aged 31)	Right	Right-arm medium
33	Shane Watson	(Australia)	17 June 1981 (aged 32)	Right	Right-arm fast-medium
77	Dishant Yagnik (wk)	(India)	22 June 1983 (aged 30)	Left	—

== Sunrisers Hyderabad ==
No.	Player	Nat	Date of birth	Batting	Bowling style
25	Shikhar Dhawan	(India)	5 December 1985 (aged 27)	Left	Right-arm off break
21	Jean-Paul Duminy	(South Africa)	14 April 1984 (aged 29)	Left	Right-arm off break
13	Clint McKay	(Australia)	20 February 1983 (aged 30)	Right	Right-arm fast-medium
99	Amit Mishra	(India)	24 November 1982 (aged 30)	Right	Leg break
42	Parthiv Patel (wk)	(India)	9 March 1985 (aged 28)	Left	—
16	Thisara Perera	(Sri Lanka)	3 April 1989 (aged 24)	Left	Right-arm medium-fast
—	Anand Rajan	(India)	17 April 1987 (aged 26)	Right	Right-arm medium
2	Ashish Reddy	(India)	24 February 1991 (aged 22)	Right	Right-arm medium
—	Biplab Samantray	(India)	14 December 1988 (aged 24)	Right	—
88	Darren Sammy	(Saint Lucia)	20 December 1983 (aged 29)	Right	Right-arm medium-fast
1	Ishant Sharma	(India)	2 September 1988 (aged 25)	Right	Right-arm fast-medium
33	Karan Sharma	(India)	23 October 1987 (aged 25)	Left	Leg break googly
8	Dale Steyn	(South Africa)	27 June 1983 (aged 30)	Right	Right-arm fast
—	Hanuma Vihari	(India)	13 October 1993 (aged 19)	Right	Right-arm off break
09	Cameron White	(c) style="text-align:center"| (Australia)	18 August 1983 (aged 30)	Right	Leg break googly

== Titans ==
No.	Player	Nat	Date of birth	Batting	Bowling style
19	Henry Davids (c)	(South Africa)	19 January 1980 (aged 33)	Right	Right-arm medium-fast
28	Farhaan Behardien	(South Africa)	9 October 1983 (aged 29)	Right	Right-arm fast-medium
90	Marchant de Lange	(South Africa)	13 October 1990 (aged 22)	Right	Right-arm fast
17	AB de Villiers	(South Africa)	17 February 1984 (aged 29)	Right	Right-arm medium
—	Cornelius de Villiers	(South Africa)	16 March 1986 (aged 27)	Right	Right-arm medium-fast
20	Heino Kuhn	(South Africa)	1 April 1984 (aged 29)	Right	—
—	Eden Links	(South Africa)	25 March 1989 (aged 24)	Right	Right-arm off break
—	Ethy Mbhalati	(South Africa)	18 November 1981 (aged 31)	Right	Right-arm medium-fast
65	Morne Morkel	(South Africa)	6 October 1984 (aged 28)	Left	Right-arm fast
33	Mangaliso Mosehle (wk)	(South Africa)	24 April 1990 (aged 23)	Right	—
8	Rowan Richards	(South Africa)	8 July 1984 (aged 29)	Left	Left-arm fast-medium
27	Jacques Rudolph	(South Africa)	4 May 1981 (aged 32)	Left	Leg break googly
—	Graeme van Buuren	(South Africa)	22 August 1990 (aged 23)	Right	Slow left arm orthodox
52	Roelof van der Merwe	(South Africa)	31 December 1984 (aged 28)	Right	Slow left arm orthodox
96	David Wiese	(South Africa)	18 May 1985 (aged 28)	Right	Right-arm medium-fast

== Trinidad and Tobago ==
No.	Player	Nat	Date of birth	Batting	Bowling style
80	Denesh Ramdin (c & wk)	(Trinidad and Tobago)	13 March 1985 (aged 28)	Right	—
7	Samuel Badree	(Trinidad and Tobago)	9 March 1981 (aged 32)	Right	Leg break
—	Adrian Barath	(Trinidad and Tobago)	14 April 1990 (aged 23)	Right	Right-arm off break
46	Darren Bravo	(Trinidad and Tobago)	6 February 1989 (aged 24)	Left	Right-arm medium-fast
51	Rayad Emrit	(Trinidad and Tobago)	8 March 1981 (aged 32)	Right	Right-arm medium-fast
—	Shannon Gabriel	(Trinidad and Tobago)	28 April 1988 (aged 25)	Right	Right-arm fast-medium
5	Sherwin Ganga	(Trinidad and Tobago)	13 February 1982 (aged 31)	Left	Right-arm off break
17	Evin Lewis	(Trinidad and Tobago)	27 December 1991 (aged 21)	Left	—
3	Jason Mohammed	(Trinidad and Tobago)	23 September 1986 (aged 26)	Right	Right-arm off break
24	Sunil Narine	(Trinidad and Tobago)	26 May 1988 (aged 25)	Left	Right-arm off break
11	Yannick Ottley	(Trinidad and Tobago)	7 September 1991 (aged 22)	Right	Slow left arm orthodox
81	Nicholas Pooran	(Trinidad and Tobago)	—	Left	—
14	Ravi Rampaul	(Trinidad and Tobago)	15 October 1984 (aged 28)	Left	Right-arm fast-medium
54	Lendl Simmons	(Trinidad and Tobago)	25 January 1985 (aged 28)	Right	Right-arm medium-fast
25	Navin Stewart	(Trinidad and Tobago)	13 June 1983 (aged 30)	Right	Right-arm fast-medium
