= Gohar Faiz =

Pakistani cricketer

Personal information
- Full name: Gohar Faiz
- Born: 27 September 1986 (age 40); Quetta, Balochistan, Pakistan
- Batting: Right-handed
- Bowling: Right-arm fast-medium
- Role: Bowler

Domestic team information
- Years: Team
- 2006/07–2024/25: Quetta
- 2006/07–2023/24: Quetta Bears
- 2017/18: Galle Cricket Club
- 2020/21–2021/22: Balochistan

Career statistics
Competition	First-class	List A	Twenty20
Matches	62	23	24
Runs scored	704	152	73
Batting average	11.00	9.50	6.63
100s/50s	0/0	0/0	0/0
Top score	49	27	16
Balls bowled	9,705	913	438
Wickets	171	24	14
Bowling average	32.68	37.08	45.50
5 wickets in innings	9	0	0
10 wickets in match	1	0	0
Best bowling	8/50	4/66	3/19
Catches/stumpings	19/–	1/–	3/–
- Source: Cricinfo, 14 April 2026

Gohar Faiz (born 27 September 1986) is a Pakistani former cricketer. Faiz was a right-handed batsman who bowled right-arm fast-medium. He was born in Quetta, Balochistan.

Faiz made his Twenty20 debut for Quetta Bears against Rawalpindi Rams in December 2006, his first-class debut for Quetta against Multan in January 2007, and his List A debut for Quetta Bears against Abbottabad Rhinos in February 2007. He later also played first-class cricket for Galle Cricket Club in Sri Lanka.

Faiz emerged as one of Quetta's leading bowlers in the 2012–13 Quaid-e-Azam Trophy. In January 2013, he recorded his best first-class innings figures to that date by taking 8 wickets for 50 runs against Islamabad. Later that season, he took a career-best match haul of 10 for 151 against Faisalabad, including 5 for 81 in the second innings, as Quetta completed their first win of the campaign.

In the 2015–16 Quaid-e-Azam Trophy, Faiz claimed five wickets in each innings against Larkana, finishing with match figures of 10 for 109 as Quetta won by 141 runs. He continued to represent Quetta in domestic cricket into the 2020s.

In August 2020, Faiz was named in Balochistan's squad for the 2020/21 domestic season, and in September 2021 he was named in Balochistan's squad for the 2021 National T20 Cup. In October 2022, playing for Balochistan in the Cricket Associations Championship, he took 5 wickets for 101 runs against Southern Punjab and finished with match figures of 8 for 150 in a nine-wicket victory.
