= 2011–12 Quaid-e-Azam Trophy =

- Dates: 6 October 2011 – 24 December 2011
- Administrator(s): Pakistan Cricket Board
- Cricket format: First-class
- Tournament format(s): Two division round-robin league and finals
- Host(s): Pakistan
- Champions: Pakistan International Airlines (7th title)
- Participants: 22
- Matches: 117
- Official website: www.pcb.com.pk

The 2011–12 Quaid-e-Azam Trophy was one of two first-class domestic cricket competitions that were held in Pakistan during the 2011–12 season. It was the 54th edition of the Quaid-e-Azam Trophy, contested by 22 teams representing regional cricket associations and departments, (Note: The top level of domestic cricket in Pakistan was historically played by teams representing regional cricket associations and departments, which were owned and run by corporations, institutions or government departments.) and was followed in the schedule by the Pentangular Cup, contested by five teams representing the four provinces and the federal areas.

The competition format was retained from the previous season, with the teams being split into two divisions: twelve teams (six regions and six departments) in Division One and the remaining ten teams (seven regions and three departments) in Division Two. Each division was played in a round-robin of 4-day matches starting on 23 October 2010, with 5-day finals between the top two teams to determine the winners. At the end of the season, the lowest ranked department and region in division one were to have been relegated to division two, with the equivalent top teams in division two being promoted and the lowest department being relegated to Grade II cricket, but the domestic structure changed prior to the 2012–13 season.

Pakistan International Airlines won the Quaid-e-Azam Trophy for the seventh time, beating Zarai Taraqiati Bank Limited by nine wickets in the Division One final, which like the previous season was a day/night match.

== Division standings ==
The top teams in each division (highlighted) advanced to the finals.

Division One
Team	Pld	W	L	T	D	A	Pts
Pakistan International Airlines	11	6	1	0	4	0	57
Zarai Taraqiati Bank Ltd.	11	6	4	0	1	0	57
Water and Power Dev. Auth.	11	6	3	1	1	0	53
State Bank of Pakistan	11	5	3	0	3	0	47
National Bank of Pakistan	11	4	1	0	6	0	41
Sialkot	11	4	4	0	3	0	39
Karachi Blues	11	4	5	0	2	0	36
Rawalpindi	11	4	5	0	2	0	36
Habib Bank Ltd. (R)	11	4	4	1	2	0	35
Abbottabad	11	3	7	0	1	0	27
Islamabad	11	2	4	0	5	0	27
Faisalabad (R)	11	1	8	0	2	0	12

Division Two
Team	Pld	W	L	T	D	A	Pts
Peshawar (P)	9	8	0	0	1	0	72
Sui Northern Gas Pipelines Ltd. (P)	9	8	1	0	0	0	72
Karachi Whites	9	6	2	0	1	0	57
Khan Research Labs.	9	5	4	0	0	0	42
United Bank Ltd. (R)	9	4	3	0	2	0	36
Lahore Ravi	9	3	3	0	3	0	33
Hyderabad	9	2	5	0	2	0	18
Quetta	9	1	5	0	3	0	15
Lahore Shalimar	9	1	7	0	1	0	9
Multan	9	0	8	0	1	0	0

bold Finalist
(P) Promoted
(R) Relegated

Position determined by total points, most matches won after having a lead on first innings, fewest matches lost, followed by adjusted net run rate (matches with no result, i.e. those where both teams did not complete their first innings, were disregarded); matches finishing in a draw were decided on first innings scores, with points awarded as follows:
- Win = 9 points
- Win having tied or trailed on first innings = 6 points
- Tie having led on first innings = 5 points
- Draw having led on first innings = 3 points
- Draw having tied on first innings, or tie having trailed on first innings = 2 points
- Loss, draw having trailed or with no result on first innings, or abandoned without a ball bowled = 0 points

== Finals ==
=== Division Two ===
8–11 December 2011
Scorecard

Sui Northern Gas Pipelines Limited	v	Peshawar
202 (56.2 Overs); Usman Arshad 41 (59); Riaz Afridi 4/55 (21.2 Overs)		351 (89.1 Overs); Jamaluddin 124 (154); Imran Ali 4/71 (19.1 Overs)
301 (83.4 Overs); Umar Akmal 93 (155); Waqar Ahmed 6/92 (27.4 Overs)		153/4 (50.5 Overs); Jamaluddin * 58 (99); Bilawal Bhatti 2/62 (18.5 Overs)

Peshawar won by 6 wickets
Arbab Niaz Stadium, Peshawar
Umpires: Ahsan Raza and Zameer Haider
Player of the match: Jamaluddin (Peshawar)

- Sui Northern Gas Pipelines Limited won the toss and chose to bat.
- Peshawar won the 2011/12 Quaid-e-Azam Trophy Division Two

=== Division One ===
20–24 December 2011 (D/N)
Scorecard

Zarai Taraqiati Bank Limited	v	Pakistan International Airlines
337 (120.3 Overs); Haris Sohail 112 (282); Anwar Ali 4/55 (29.3 Overs)		300 (106.1 Overs); Sarfraz Ahmed 70 (91); Iftikhar Anjum 4/78 (24.1 Overs)
70 (27 Overs); Haris Sohail 19 (27.2); Anwar Ali 4/31 (8.2 Overs)		110/1 (21.2 Overs); Agha Sabir 40* (64); Sohail Tanvir 1/25 (7 Overs)

Pakistan International Airlines won by 9 wickets
National Stadium, Karachi
Umpires: Ahsan Raza and Zameer Haider
Player of the match: Anwar Ali

- Pakistan International Airlines won the toss and chose to field.
- Pakistan International Airlines won the 2011/12 Quaid-e-Azam Trophy Division One
