= Afaq Ahmed (cricketer) =

Pakistani cricketer

Personal information
- Full name: Afaq Ahmed
- Born: 7 January 1990 (age 36); Malakand, North-West Frontier Province, Pakistan
- Batting: Right-handed
- Bowling: Right-arm medium-fast
- Role: Bowler

Domestic team information
- Years: Team
- Peshawar
- National Bank of Pakistan
- Peshawar Panthers

Career statistics
Competition	First-class	List A	Twenty20
Matches	39	19	1
Runs scored	243	20	6*
Batting average	9.00	6.66	–
100s/50s	0/0	0/0	0/0
Top score	37*	8*	6*
Balls bowled	6,478	826	18
Wickets	135	22	0
Bowling average	24.05	33.09	–
5 wickets in innings	3	0	0
10 wickets in match	0	0	0
Best bowling	6/46	4/54	–
Catches/stumpings	15/–	1/–	0/–
- Source: Cricinfo, 13 April 2026

Afaq Ahmed (born 7 January 1990) is a Pakistani former cricketer. Born in Malakand, North-West Frontier Province, he was a right-arm medium-fast bowler.

Ahmed made his List A debut for Peshawar Panthers against Lahore Lions in the ABN-AMRO Cup in March 2008. In August 2008, he was named in Peshawar's squad for the Inter-region Under-19 tournament. The following month, playing for NIB Bank in the AKU Twenty20 Ramazan cricket tournament, he took 3 wickets for 19 runs against Saudi Pak Bank and was named player of the match. He made his first-class debut for Peshawar against Multan in February 2009.

In December 2013, Ahmed and Azam Khan shared a last-wicket partnership of 95 for Peshawar against Karachi Blues, with Ahmed making what was then a career-best 34 not out. Earlier in the same season, he had taken 3 wickets for 62 runs in Peshawar's match against Rawalpindi. During the 2013–14 One Day Cup, a century from Adil Amin followed by incisive bowling from Ahmed and Azam Khan helped Peshawar Panthers rout Sialkot Stallions by 168 runs. He made his only Twenty20 appearance for Peshawar Panthers against Islamabad Leopards in the 2013–14 National T20 Cup, scoring 6 not out and bowling three overs.

Ahmed later played first-class and List A cricket for National Bank of Pakistan. In September 2016, he was named in the bank's squad for the 2016–17 Quaid-e-Azam Trophy.
