= Usman Tariq (cricketer, born 1983) =

Pakistani cricketer (born 1983)

Personal information
- Full name: Usman Tariq Chaudhry
- Born: 28 December 1983 (age 42); Bahawalpur, Punjab, Pakistan
- Batting: Left-handed
- Bowling: Right-arm slow
- Role: Top-order batter

Domestic team information
- Years: Team
- Bahawalpur
- Allied Bank Limited
- Multan
- Pakistan International Airlines
- Baluchistan
- Sui Southern Gas Corporation

Career statistics
Competition	First-class	List A	Twenty20
Matches	151	85	12
Runs scored	8,547	2,584	175
Batting average	35.61	33.55	15.90
100s/50s	14/51	5/16	0/0
Top score	223*	131	34
Balls bowled	4,550	1,014	–
Wickets	80	16	–
Bowling average	31.01	55.12	–
5 wickets in innings	2	0	–
10 wickets in match	0	–	–
Best bowling	5/103	4/31	–
Catches/stumpings	92/–	22/–	2/–
- Source: Cricinfo, 15 April 2026

Usman Tariq Chaudhry (born 28 December 1983) is a Pakistani former cricketer. Tariq was a left-handed top-order batsman who also bowled occasionally. He was born in Bahawalpur, Punjab, Pakistan.

A left-handed top-order batter, Tariq made his List A debut for Bahawalpur in the 1996–97 season when he was only 13, and made his first-class debut the following season. He later represented Bahawalpur, Allied Bank Limited, Multan, Pakistan International Airlines, Baluchistan and Sui Southern Gas Corporation in Pakistani domestic cricket, and also played for Pakistan Under-19s. His brother Hammad Tariq and father Tariq Abdullah also played first-class cricket for Bahawalpur.

In February 2002, Tariq became the eighth batter to complete 1,000 runs in the domestic season when he reached an unbeaten 163 for Bahawalpur against Sargodha in the Quaid-e-Azam Trophy. He converted that innings into 210 the following day, then a career-best score, in Bahawalpur's first innings total of 526 for eight declared. The next month, playing for Allied Bank against Pakistan International Airlines in the National One-day Championship, he made 131 from 130 balls, although Allied Bank lost by four wickets.

By 2002, he was playing club cricket in the Liverpool and District Cricket Competition in England. In November 2005, batting for Multan after being forced to follow on against defending champions Peshawar, he made 119 not out and helped his side wipe out the deficit to keep the match alive.

By the end of his career, Tariq had scored 8,547 runs in 151 first-class matches, including 14 centuries and 51 half-centuries, and taken 80 wickets with the ball, including two five-wicket hauls with best figures of 5 for 103. He also made 2,584 runs in 85 List A matches, including five centuries, with a highest score of 131.
