= Peshawar women's cricket team =

Pakistani women's cricket team

Peshawar Women
Personnel
- Captain: Salma Faiz

Team information
- Founded: Unknown First recorded match: 2005

History
- NWCC wins: 0

The Peshawar women's cricket team is the women's representative cricket team for Peshawar in domestic cricket in Pakistan. They competed in the National Women's Cricket Championship between 2004–05 and 2017.

== History ==
Peshawar joined the National Women's Cricket Championship for its inaugural season in 2004–05, losing to Hyderabad in the initial knock-out stage. The side went on to compete in every edition of the National Women's Cricket Championship until it ended in 2017. Their best finish came in 2005–06, when they won the Rawalpindi Zone of the competition to progress to the Final Stage group, where they finished third out of the three teams that qualified.

== Players ==
=== Notable players ===
The players who played for Peshawar and for Pakistan internationally are listed below, in order of first international appearance (given in brackets):

- (Pakistan) Qanita Jalil (2005)

== Seasons ==
=== National Women's Cricket Championship ===
Season	Division	League standings								Notes
Season	Division	P	W	L	T	A/C	Pts	NRR	Pos	Notes
2004–05	N/A	Eliminated in knock-out round								
2005–06	Rawalpindi Zone	2	2	0	0	0	8	+2.517	1st	3rd in Final Stage
2006–07	Group C	3	2	0	0	1	10	+2.057	2nd	
2007–08	Group B	3	1	2	0	0	4	–0.577	4th	
2009–10	Zone A	4	2	2	0	0	8	+0.976	3rd	
2010–11	Zone A	4	1	2	1	0	6	–1.137	4th	
2011–12	Zone B	4	1	3	0	0	4	–1.154	4th	
2012–13	Pool B Group 1	3	1	2	0	0	2	–0.549	3rd	
2014	Qualifying Group II	2	1	1	0	0	2	+0.620	2nd	
2015	Pool B	3	0	3	0	0	0	–2.121	4th	
2016	Pool C	3	0	2	0	1	1	–1.044	4th	
2017	Pool A	3	0	3	0	0	0	–2.070	4th	

== Honours ==
- National Women's Cricket Championship:
  - Winners (0):
  - Best finish: 3rd (2005–06)

== See also ==
- Peshawar cricket team
