= Usman Tariq (disambiguation) =

Usman Tariq (born 1995) is a Pakistani international cricketer.

Usman Tariq may also refer to:

- Usman Tariq (cricketer, born 1983), Pakistani cricketer
- Usman Khawaja (Usman Tariq Khawaja, born 1986), Australian cricketer

== See also ==
- Tarık Çamdal (Osman Tarık Çamdal, born 1991), Turkish footballer
