= Usman Liaqat =

Pakistani cricketer (born 1992)

Personal information
- Born: 2 May 1992 (age 34)
- Source: Cricinfo, 2 October 2018

Usman Liaqat (born 2 May 1992) is a Pakistani cricketer. He made his first-class debut for Multan in the 2012–13 Quaid-e-Azam Trophy on 28 December 2012.
