= Adnan Rasool =

Pakistani cricketer

Personal information
- Full name: Adnan Rasool
- Born: 1 May 1981 (age 45); Faisalabad, Punjab, Pakistan
- Batting: Right-handed
- Bowling: Right-arm off break
- Role: Bowler

Domestic team information
- Years: Team
- 2001/02–2002/03: Faisalabad
- 2006/07–2009/10: Sui Northern Gas Pipelines Limited
- 2010/11–2012/13: State Bank of Pakistan
- 2012/13: Lahore Ravi
- 2012/13: Lahore Eagles
- 2010/11–2014/15: Lahore Lions
- 2013/14–2015/16: National Bank of Pakistan
- 2015/16: Lahore Qalandars
- 2016/17–2017/18: Lahore Whites

Career statistics
Competition	First-class	List A	Twenty20
Matches	55	43	41
Runs scored	529	201	66
Batting average	10.79	11.82	9.42
100s/50s	0/0	0/0	0/0
Top score	36	36*	41*
Balls bowled	9,926	2,179	865
Wickets	183	53	45
Bowling average	25.04	31.73	21.46
5 wickets in innings	11	0	0
10 wickets in match	0	0	0
Best bowling	6/105	4/28	4/21
Catches/stumpings	23/–	9/–	7/–
- Source: Cricinfo, 13 April 2026

Adnan Rasool (born 1 May 1981) is a Pakistani former cricketer. Rasool was a right-handed batsman who bowled right-arm off break. He was born in Faisalabad, Punjab.

Rasool made his List A debut for Faisalabad in the 2001/02 season, before making his first-class debut for the side in the following season. In January 2003, playing only his second first-class match, he took 5 wickets for 62 runs against Zarai Taraqiati Bank Limited in the quarter-final of the Quaid-e-Azam Trophy. He later played first-class cricket for Punjab, Sui Northern Gas Pipelines Limited, State Bank of Pakistan, Lahore Ravi, National Bank of Pakistan and Lahore Whites, while in limited-overs cricket he also represented Lahore Eagles and Lahore Lions. He also appeared for Pakistan A in List A cricket in 2012/13.

During the 2012–13 Quaid-e-Azam Trophy, Rasool was one of Lahore Ravi's leading bowlers. In January 2013, he took match figures of 9 for 89 against Quetta, including innings analyses of 5 for 67 and 4 for 22, helping Lahore Ravi to an innings victory. Later that month, he took 5 for 133 against Karachi Blues.

Rasool represented Lahore Lions in Twenty20 cricket and was part of the side that retained the 2013–14 Faysal Bank T20 Cup, thereby qualifying for the Champions League Twenty20. He was named in Lahore Lions' squad for the 2014 Champions League Twenty20. Following Saeed Ajmal's suspension in 2014, Rasool was reported as one of the off-spinners being considered as a possible replacement. Later that month, during the Champions League Twenty20, he was reported for a suspect bowling action after Lahore Lions' match against Kolkata Knight Riders.

Rasool later played three matches for Lahore Qalandars in the inaugural season of the Pakistan Super League. He continued to appear in Pakistani domestic cricket for Lahore Whites until the 2017/18 season.
