= Sajjad Ahmed (cricketer, born 1980) =

Pakistani cricketer (born 1980)

Personal information
- Born: 2 April 1980 (age 46); Peshawar, Pakistan
- Source: Cricinfo, 14 November 2015

Sajjad Ahmed (born 2 April 1980) is a Pakistani first-class cricketer who played for Peshawar cricket team.
