= Mehran Ibrahim =

Pakistani cricketer (born 1993)

Personal information
- Born: 20 November 1993 (age 32); Peshawar, Khyber Pakhtunkhwa, Pakistan
- Batting: Right-handed
- Source: Cricinfo, 17 December 2015

Mehran Ibrahim (born 20 November 1993) is a Pakistani first-class cricketer who plays for Peshawar.
