= Atif Maqbool =

Pakistani cricketer

Personal information
- Full name: Atif Maqbool
- Born: 21 November 1981 (age 44); Karachi, Sindh, Pakistan
- Batting: Right-handed
- Bowling: Right-arm off break
- Role: Bowler

Domestic team information
- Years: Team
- Karachi
- Karachi Harbour
- Karachi Zebras
- Karachi Dolphins
- Pakistan Customs
- Public Works Department
- Pakistan International Airlines

Career statistics
Competition	First-class	List A	Twenty20
Matches	60	48	27
Runs scored	837	163	22
Batting average	12.68	7.76	3.66
100s/50s	0/0	0/0	0/0
Top score	45*	18	4*
Balls bowled	11,687	2,425	593
Wickets	255	71	34
Bowling average	25.77	26.38	19.50
5 wickets in innings	22	1	0
10 wickets in match	4	0	0
Best bowling	7/59	5/21	3/20
Catches/stumpings	26/–	11/–	6/–
- Source: Cricinfo, 13 April 2026

Atif Maqbool (born 21 November 1981) is a Pakistani former cricketer. Maqbool was a right-handed batsman who bowled right-arm off break. He was born in Karachi, Sindh.

Maqbool made his first-class and List A debuts in the 2001/02 Pakistani domestic season. He went on to play domestic cricket for Karachi, Karachi Harbour, Karachi Dolphins, Karachi Zebras, Pakistan Customs, Pakistan International Airlines, Public Works Department, and Pakistan A. In September 2007, he was named in Pakistan A's squad for the unofficial four-day series against Australia A, and in the preceding one-day series he took 2 wickets for 54 runs in Pakistan A's victory in the second unofficial ODI.

Maqbool's most notable domestic performances came in the 2012–13 Quaid-e-Azam Trophy. Against Abbottabad in January 2013, he first took 6 wickets for 60 runs and then improved on those figures with 7 for 59, finishing with match figures of 13 for 119 in Karachi Whites' innings victory. A few days later, he claimed his third successive five-wicket haul in the same competition when he took 5 for 62 against Rawalpindi.

By the 2013–14 President's Trophy, Maqbool was captaining United Bank Limited. Before the final, he had taken 53 wickets in nine matches at an average of 16.25, including six five-wicket hauls and two 10-wicket match hauls, helping drive United Bank Limited to the title match against Sui Northern Gas Pipelines Limited. In September 2014, he was considered among the possible replacements for Saeed Ajmal after Ajmal's suspension as he was the leading wicket-taker in the previous season's President's Trophy with 57 wickets at an average of 17.17.
