= Tariq Haroon =

Pakistani cricketer (born 1977)

Personal information
- Full name: Tariq Haroon
- Born: 3 February 1977 (age 49); Karachi, Sindh, Pakistan
- Batting: Right-handed
- Bowling: Right-arm medium-fast
- Role: All-rounder

Domestic team information
- Years: Team
- 2000/01–2016/17: Karachi Whites
- 2001/02: Pakistan Customs
- 2004/05: Karachi Zebras
- 2006/07–2011/12: Karachi Dolphins
- 2007/08–2012/13: Karachi Blues
- 2013/14–2017/18: Sui Southern Gas Corporation
- FC debut: 21 October 2001 Pakistan Customs v Public Works Department
- Last FC: 9 December 2017 Sui Southern Gas Corporation v Khan Research Laboratories
- Last LA: 27 January 2017 Karachi Whites v Peshawar

Career statistics
Competition	First-class	List A	Twenty20
Matches	80	64	36
Runs scored	2817	1362	409
Batting average	23.47	27.79	17.78
100s/50s	2/12	3/3	0/0
Top score	142*	120	48
Balls bowled	11724	1590	502
Wickets	240	34	19
Bowling average	25.15	42.82	33.47
5 wickets in innings	6	0	0
10 wickets in match	0	0	0
Best bowling	6/63	3/13	3/14
Catches/stumpings	46/–	19/–	8/–
- Source: ESPNCricinfo, 5 July 2026

Tariq Haroon (born 3 February 1977) is a Pakistani former cricketer. Haroon was a right-handed batsman who bowled right-arm medium-fast. He was born in Karachi, Sindh.

Haroon made his List A debut for Karachi Whites in the One Day Tournament (Associations) in the 2000/01 Pakistani season. He made his first-class debut for Pakistan Customs against Public Works Department in the 2001–02 Patron's Trophy on 21 October 2001, and made his Twenty20 debut for Karachi Zebras against Multan Tigers in the ABN-AMRO Twenty-20 Cup on 25 April 2005.

During his domestic career, Haroon represented Karachi Whites, Pakistan Customs, Karachi Blues, Karachi Zebras, Karachi Dolphins, Sui Southern Gas Corporation, United Bank Limited and Karachi Electric Supply Corporation Limited. He also represented Karachi Zone I, Karachi Zone IV, Karachi Zone VI, Karachi Greens and Karachi in Pakistan's domestic competitions.

Haroon established himself as a useful all-rounder in domestic cricket. In November 2007, playing for Karachi Blues in the Quaid-e-Azam Trophy, he scored an unbeaten 142 against Islamabad, his highest score in first-class cricket. Two years later, he took 6 wickets for 127 runs for Karachi Blues against Faisalabad in the 2009–10 Quaid-e-Azam Trophy.

Haroon was part of the Karachi Blues side that won the 2012–13 Quaid-e-Azam Trophy, taking 5 wickets for 74 runs in the final against Sialkot. In October 2014, playing for Sui Southern Gas Corporation in the 2014–15 Quaid-e-Azam Trophy Silver League, he scored a century from number eight in an innings victory over Faisalabad Wolves.

Haroon played 80 first-class, 64 List A and 36 Twenty20 matches between 2000 and 2017, scoring 2,817 first-class runs and taking 240 wickets in the format.
