= Mohibullah (cricketer) =

Pakistani cricketer (born 1989)

Personal information
- Born: 2 September 1989 (age 37); Pishin, Pakistan
- Source: Cricinfo, 28 November 2015

Mohibullah (born 2 September 1989) is a Pakistani first-class cricketer who plays for Quetta cricket team.
