= Rizwan Haider =

Pakistani cricketer (born 1985)

Personal information
- Full name: Rizwan Haider
- Born: 16 June 1985 (age 41); Renala Khurd, Punjab, Pakistan
- Batting: Left-handed
- Bowling: Left-arm medium-fast
- Role: Bowling all-rounder

Domestic team information
- Years: Team
- Regional XI (Multan & Bahawalpur)
- 2008/09–2018/19: Multan
- 2008/09–2014/15: Multan Tigers
- 2010/11–2011/12: Baluchistan
- 2010/11–2014/15: State Bank of Pakistan
- 2015/16–2016/17: Water and Power Development Authority
- 2016/17: Harare Metropolitan Eagles
- 2017/18: Saracens Sports Club
- 2018/19: Badureliya Sports Club

Career statistics
Competition	First-class	List A	Twenty20
Matches	70	56	34
Runs scored	2,270	960	341
Batting average	25.50	25.26	22.73
100s/50s	1/16	0/4	0/0
Top score	107	78*	42*
Balls bowled	9,635	2,042	532
Wickets	197	54	13
Bowling average	26.01	31.42	56.69
5 wickets in innings	8	1	0
10 wickets in match	2	0	0
Best bowling	7/42	5/31	2/23
Catches/stumpings	36/–	14/–	10/–
- Source: Cricinfo, 3 May 2026

Rizwan Haider (born 16 June 1985) is a Pakistani former cricketer. Haider was a left-handed batsman who bowled left-arm medium-fast. He was born in Renala Khurd, Punjab, and played domestic cricket in Pakistan for Multan, Multan Tigers, Baluchistan, State Bank of Pakistan and Water and Power Development Authority, later also appearing in Zimbabwe and Sri Lanka domestic cricket.

Haider made his first-class debut for Multan against Sialkot at Okara in January 2009. He later became a regular left-arm seamer in Pakistan domestic cricket, especially for State Bank of Pakistan. His only first-class century was 107, while as a bowler he took eight five-wicket hauls and twice claimed ten wickets in a match.

One of Haider's early standout performances came in the 2010–11 Quaid-e-Azam Trophy Division Two, when he ran through Karachi Whites for State Bank of Pakistan, helping his side to a ten-wicket victory inside three days. In the following season, he produced the best innings figures of his first-class career, taking 7 for 42 against Habib Bank Limited in the 2011–12 Quaid-e-Azam Trophy Division One, a spell that sealed a 12-run win for State Bank of Pakistan.

Haider's finest match performance came in the semi-final of the 2014–15 Quaid-e-Azam Trophy Silver League, when he took a career-best 11 for 158 and sent State Bank of Pakistan into the final with a three-wicket victory over Pakistan International Airlines. In List A cricket, his best bowling figures were 5 for 31, the only five-wicket haul of his senior limited-overs career.

Late in his career, Haider also played outside Pakistan. He appeared for Harare Metropolitan Eagles in Zimbabwe domestic cricket in 2016–17, for whom he scored 62 in a first-class match against Matabeleland Tuskers, and later played first-class cricket for Saracens Sports Club and Badureliya Sports Club in Sri Lanka.

Overall, Haider played in 70 first-class matches, scoring 2,270 runs at a batting average of 25.50 and taking 197 wickets at a bowling average of 26.01. In 56 List A matches, he scored 960 runs and took 54 wickets, while in 34 Twenty20 matches he scored 341 runs and took 13 wickets.
