= Mir Ali (cricketer) =

Pakistani cricketer (born 1988)

Personal information
- Full name: Mir Ali Khan Talpur
- Born: 29 October 1988 (age 38); Hyderabad, Pakistan
- Batting: Right-handed
- Bowling: Right-arm medium fast
- Source: Cricinfo, 1 November 2015

Mir Ali Khan Talpur (born 29 October 1988) is a Pakistani first-class cricketer who plays for Hyderabad. In the 2011–12 Quaid-e-Azam Trophy, he took a hat-trick against Multan.
