= Ikhlaq Butt =

Pakistani cricketer (born 1992)

Personal information
- Born: 21 September 1992 (age 34)
- Source: Cricinfo, 27 March 2021

Ikhlaq Butt (born 21 September 1992) is a Pakistani cricketer. He played in seventeen first-class and eleven List A matches between 2012 and 2016. He made his Twenty20 debut on 7 February 2014, for Lahore Eagles in the 2013–14 National T20 Cup.
