= Nayyer Abbas =

Pakistani cricketer (born 1990)

Personal information
- Born: 15 January 1990 (age 36); Abbas Nagar, Punjab, Pakistan
- Batting: Left-handed
- Bowling: Slow left-arm Orthodox

Career statistics
Competition	FC	LA	T20
Matches	80	50	13
Runs scored	2,609	480	82
Batting average	23.08	16.00	27.33
100s/50s	1/13	0/1	0/0
Top score	101	65	43*
Balls bowled	13,001	2,342	288
Wickets	239	50	14
Bowling average	24.61	35.52	21.42
5 wickets in innings	6	0	0
10 wickets in match	0	0	0
Best bowling	7/60	4/30	3/25
Catches/stumpings	62/–	15/–	3/–
Medal record
Men's Cricket
Representing Pakistan
South Asian Games
Bronze medal – third place	2010 Dhaka	Team
- Source: Cricinfo, 25 November 2015

Nayyer Abbas (born 15 January 1990) is a Pakistani first-class cricketer who played for Khan Research Laboratories. He also played club cricket for Wollaton of the Nottinghamshire Premier League and Knypersley of the North Staffordshire and South Cheshire League where he won the Cricket World Club Player of the Year award in 2011.

Abbas was part of the Pakistan team that won the bronze medal in the cricket event at the 2010 South Asian Games at Dhaka, Bangladesh.

== See also ==
- Abdul Ghaffar
- Aun Abbas
