= Akbar-ur-Rehman =

Pakistani cricketer

Personal information
- Full name: Akbar-ur-Rehman
- Born: 14 September 1983 (age 43); Karachi, Sindh, Pakistan
- Batting: Right-handed
- Bowling: Leg break googly
- Role: All-rounder

Domestic team information
- Years: Team
- 2008–2015/16: Karachi Zebras
- 2016–2017: Quetta Gladiators
- 2018–2020/21: Balochistan
Medal record
Representing Pakistan
Men's Cricket
Asian Games
| Bronze medal – third place | 2010 Guangzhou | Team |
- Source: ESPNcricinfo, 10 September 2020

Akbar-ur-Rehman (born 14 September 1983, Karachi) is an international cricketer from Pakistan, who plays as an all-rounder. He was part of the bronze medal-winning team at the 2010 Asian Games in Guangzhou, China.

== Career ==
In November 2010, Akbar was part of the Pakistan team at the Asian Games in Guangzhou, China which won a bronze medal by beating Sri Lanka in the 3rd-place playoffs.

In April 2018, he was named in Balochistan's squad for the 2018 Pakistan Cup. In January 2021, he was named in Balochistan's squad for the 2020–21 Pakistan Cup.
