= Mohammad Salman (cricketer) =

Pakistani cricketer

Personal information
- Full name: Mohammad Salman
- Born: 7 August 1981 (age 45); Karachi, Sindh, Pakistan
- Batting: Right-handed
- Bowling: Legbreak
- Role: Wicketkeeper

International information
- National side: Pakistan (2011)
- Test debut (cap 206): 12 May 2011 v West Indies
- Last Test: 20 May 2011 v West Indies
- ODI debut (cap 182): 23 April 2011 v West Indies
- Last ODI: 30 November 2011 v Ireland
- Only T20I (cap 41): 21 April 2011 v West Indies

Career statistics
Competition	Test	ODI	FC	LA
Matches	2	7	136	96
Runs scored	25	22	5,009	1,935
Batting average	6.25	11.00	26.93	30.23
100s/50s	0/0	0/0	4/29	2/11
Top score	13	19*	126*	113*
Balls bowled	–	–	188	6
Wickets	–	–	5	0
Bowling average	–	–	24.20	–
5 wickets in innings	–	–	0	–
10 wickets in match	–	–	0	–
Best bowling	–	–	2/4	–
Catches/stumpings	2/1	8/2	392/21	96/28
- Source: Cricinfo, 11 December 2013

Mohammad Salman (born 7 August 1981) is a Pakistani former cricketer who was a right-handed batsman and a wicketkeeper. He was brought in as a replacement for Kamran Akmal.

== International ==
Salman made his international debut (in all formats) versus West Indies in the only T20 played at Beausejour Stadium, Gros Islet, St Lucia on 21 April 2011. His first dismissal in international cricket was the stumping of Marlon Samuels of the bowling of Saeed Ajmal.

In his debut match on 21 April 2011 versus the West Indies, he took one catch (Darren Sammy) and initiated one stumping (Marlon Samuels) and made 5 runs.

On 23 April 2011, Salman along with Hammad Azam and Junaid Khan made their one-day international debuts against West Indies in St. Lucia. Salman scored 22 runs in 3 innings with the bat and took 2 catches in 5 matches and did not bat against Ireland.

Salman only managed 4 runs in his first test and 21 runs in the second one, with 2 catches and a stumping.
