= Quaid-e-Azam Stadium =

Cricket stadium in Pakistan

Coordinates: 33°8′37.50″N 73°44′48.11″E

Quaid-e-Azam Stadium قائدِ اعظم سٹیڈیم
- Mirpur Cricket Stadium
- Interactive map of Quaid-e-Azam Stadium قائدِ اعظم سٹیڈیم
- Location: Mirpur, Azad Kashmir, Pakistan
- Country: Pakistan
- Establishment: 10 October 2007; 18 years ago
- Capacity: 16,000
- Owner: Pakistan Cricket Board
- Tenants: AJK cricket team Pakistan cricket team
- As of 4 October 2022; Source: ESPNCricinfo

The Quaid-e-Azam Stadium (Urdu: قائدِ اعظم سٹیڈیم; also known as Mirpur Cricket Stadium) is a cricket stadium in sector F/2 Mirpur, Azad Kashmir, Pakistan. It is the home of Azad Jammu and Kashmir cricket team. The stadium has a seating capacity of 16,000, making it the largest stadium in Azad Kashmir.

On 11 July 2008, the Azad Jammu & Kashmir government handed over the Quaid-e-Azam Cricket Stadium to Pakistan Cricket Board (PCB) for holding national and international cricket matches. The PCB announced it would install an electrical scoreboard, floodlights and other required facilities for holding international and national one-day matches.

== Matches hosted ==
The Mirpur Stadium has hosted twenty first-class matches. It hosted six matches of the 2012–13 Faysal Bank One Day Cup. it has also hosted three Under-19 international matches against Australia in 2007. In this stadium on inauguration of stadium a match was held on which Makhdoom Abbas Played Extraordinary 50+Runs. Due to an earthquake in September 2019, forcing the It was due to host two Quaid-e-Azam Trophy Second XI matches in October 2019, but they were shifted to Karachi after an earthquake damaged the dressing room and the team hotel.

== See also ==
- Narol Cricket Stadium (Muzaffarabad Cricket Stadium)
- Sardar Muhammad Hussain Sport's Complex, Bagh, Azad Kashmir
- List of stadiums in Pakistan
- List of cricket grounds in Pakistan
- Kashmir Premier League (Pakistan)
- Kashmir Premier League (India)
