= Fahad Iqbal =

Pakistani cricketer (born 1986)

Personal information
- Born: 25 February 1986 (age 40); Karachi, Pakistan
- Source: Cricinfo, 14 November 2015

Fahad Iqbal (born 25 February 1986) is a Pakistani cricketer who played for Pakistan International Airlines. In March 2019, he was named in Punjab's squad for the 2019 Pakistan Cup.
