= Ali Shamsher Khan =

Personal information
- Born: 1 August 1989 (age 37); Sialkot, Punjab, Pakistan
- Batting: Right-handed
- Bowling: Right-arm medium fast
- Role: All Rounder

International information
- National side: Canada
- Only ODI: 11 August 2026 v United Arab Emirates

Career statistics
Competition	ODI	FC	LA
Matches	1	71	77
Runs scored	5	2671	1737
Batting average	-	27.25	36.18
100s/50s	0/0	4/12	0/10
Top score	5*	187	87*
Balls bowled	48	3176	925
Wickets	0	65	19
Bowling average	-	28.64	46.52
5 wickets in innings	0	1	0
10 wickets in match	0	0	0
Best bowling	-	8/50	3/32
Catches/stumpings	0/–	41/–	28/–
- Source: Cricinfo, 21 August 2026

Ali Shamsher Khan (Born August 1, 1989, Sialkot, Punjab) is a cricketer who plays for Canada..

He made his One Day International (ODI) debut for Canada on 11 August 2026, against the United Arab Emirates.
