= Ammar Mahmood =

Pakistani cricketer (1979–2021)

Personal information
- Born: 4 April 1979; Faisalabad, Pakistan
- Died: 29 October 2021 (aged 42)
- Source: Cricinfo, 12 November 2015

Ammar Mahmood (4 April 1979 – 29 October 2021) was a Pakistani first-class cricketer who played for Faisalabad and Pakistan Television between 2007 and 2015. He also played for Cleckheaton in the Bradford Premier League in England. He died from stomach cancer at the age of 42.
