= Nasir Malik =

Pakistani cricketer (born 1990)

Personal information
- Born: 22 November 1990 (age 35); Rawalpindi, Pakistan
- Source: Cricinfo, 18 March 2021

Nasir Malik (born 22 November 1990) is a Pakistani cricketer who plays as a left-arm medium bowler. He played in 36 first-class and 24 List A matches between 2008 and 2018.
