= Adnan Akmal =

Pakistani cricketer

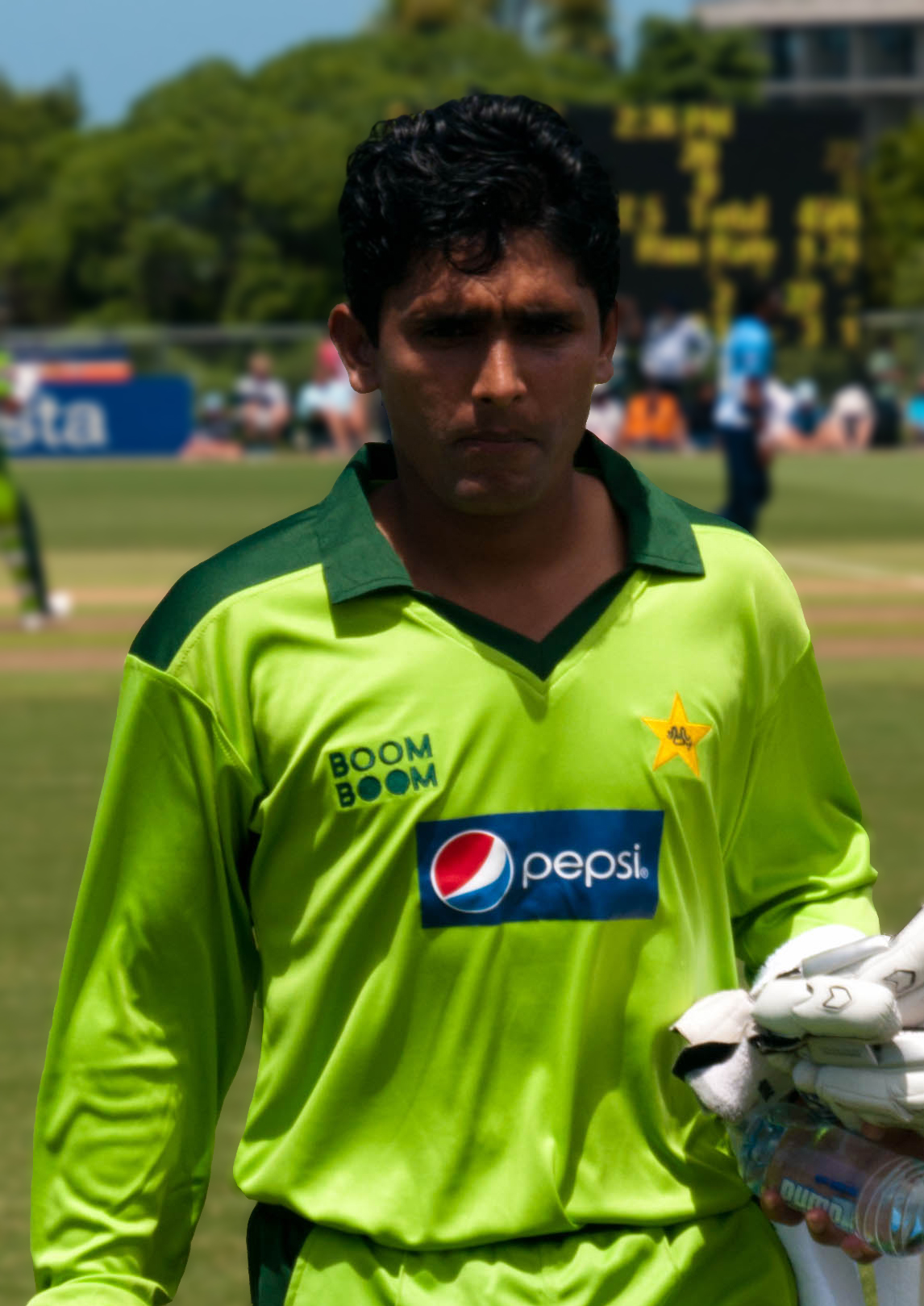

Personal information
- Full name: Adnan Akmal
- Born: 13 March 1985 (age 41); Lahore, Punjab, Pakistan
- Height: 1.65 m (5 ft 5 in)
- Batting: Right-handed
- Bowling: Right-arm medium
- Role: Wicket-keeper
- Relatives: Kamran Akmal (brother); Umar Akmal (brother); Babar Azam (cousin); Safeer Azam(cousin)

International information
- National side: Pakistan (2010–2013)
- Test debut (cap 203): 12 November 2010 v South Africa
- Last Test: 23 October 2013 v South Africa
- ODI debut (cap 186): 8 September 2011 v Zimbabwe
- Last ODI: 21 February 2012 v England

Domestic team information
- Years: Team
- 2007–present: SNGPL
- 2006–2007: Lahore Ravi
- 2003–2007: ZTBL
- 2005–2006: Multan
- 2004–2005: Lahore Blues
- 2003–2004: Lahore
- 2005–present: Lahore Eagles
- 2019–present: Southern Punjab

Career statistics
Competition	Test	ODI	FC	LA
Matches	21	5	170	101
Runs scored	591	62	6,519	1,629
Batting average	24.62	20.66	29.10	23.60
100s/50s	0/3	0/0	9/34	0/6
Top score	64	27	149*	85*
Catches/stumpings	66/11	3/0	546/32	112/33
- Source: ESPNcricinfo, 14 March 2021

Adnan Akmal (Urdu: عدنان اکمل; born 13 March 1985) is a Pakistani former cricketer. He is a right-handed batsman and wicket-keeper who plays for Zarai Taraqiati Bank Ltd Cricket Team and has represented his country at U-17 level. He was called up for Pakistan's tour against South Africa in the UAE, as a replacement for the first-choice keeper, Zulqarnain Haider.

== Personal life ==
Adnan Akmal was born in Lahore. His brothers, Kamran Akmal and Umar Akmal, both had central contracts with the Pakistan Cricket Board, and were regular fixtures in the national team.

== Domestic career ==
Adnan made his first-class debut for Zarai Traqiata Bank Limited against Karachi Port Trust at Peshawar on 15 December 2003.

In April 2018, he was named in Sindh's squad for the 2018 Pakistan Cup. In March 2019, he was named in Khyber Pakhtunkhwa's squad for the 2019 Pakistan Cup.

In September 2019, he represented Southern Punjab in the 2019–20 Quaid-e-Azam Trophy tournament. In January 2021, he was a part of Balochistan's squad for the 2020–21 Pakistan Cup.

== International career ==
Adnan was added to Pakistan's Test squad in replacement of Zulqarnain Haider, who announced his retirement from the international cricket after allegedly receiving threats from bookies. He made his Test debut against South Africa on 12 November 2010. He was Pakistan A's wicket keeper.
