= Final (competition) =

Last game of a competition to decide the winner

The final of a competition is the match or round in which the winner of the entire event is decided.

In sports competitions following a knockout system, where only two individuals or teams compete in each match, the final is usually played between the winners of two semifinals. However, if more than two entrants are required for each match, then qualification for the final may be through some other process such as winning heats.

The final is usually, but not always, the last match in a tournament to be played, and the winner of this match is declared the winner of the whole tournament. In many contests, the winner(s) and runner(s)-up receive gold and silver medals respectively. Another game, or competition, between the two players who lost in the semifinals is done to determine who receives the bronze medal. With multi-competitor finals, the grand final may determine medals placements, while the consolation final may set the lesser rankings.

If the final round is contested in a "best-of" format (like "best-of-7"), the term is sometimes called "finals," (playoffs) to denote that there is more than one game (like "the NBA Finals"). The NHL has referred to the "Stanley Cup Final" in the singular since the 2005–06 season, although media outlets have used the plural "Stanley Cup Finals" The NHL refers to its semifinal round as the Conference Finals, because there are two separate ones being contested.

== See also ==
- Championship
- Grand final
- Playoffs
