= Pakistan International Airlines cricket team =

Cricket team

Pakistan International Airlines

Personnel
- Captain: Sarfaraz Ahmed
- Owner: Pakistan International Airlines

Team information
- Colours
- Founded: 1960
- Dissolved: 2020
- Official website: www.piac.com.pk

Pakistan International Airlines (PIA) cricket team was a first-class cricket side sponsored by the national flag carrier, Pakistan International Airlines (PIA), and was based in Karachi before its disestablishment in 2020. The side has won the Quaid-e-Azam Trophy more times than anyone else except Karachi.

They played their first first-class match in May 1961, under the captaincy of Hanif Mohammad, and their last in November 2016, captained by Fahad Iqbal. They played 407 first-class matches, with 159 wins, 73 losses and 175 draws.

== Honours ==
Qaid-i-Azam Trophy (6)

- 1969-70
- 1979-80

PIA cricketer Shoaib Akhtar

- 1987-88
- 1989-90
- 1999-2000
- 2002-03
- 2011-12

National One Day Championship (11)

- 1980–81
- 1981–82
- 1982–83
- 1985–86
- 1987-88
- 1995–96
- 1999–2000
- 2001–02
- 2002–03
- 2008–09
- 2011–12 Division One

== Notable players ==
- Imran Khan
- Asif Mujtaba
- Anil Dalpat
- Wasim Akram
- Zaheer Abbas
- Wasim Bari
- Shoaib Akhtar
- Mohammad Yousuf
- Shoaib Malik
- Abdul Razzaq
- Najaf Shah
- Yasir Hameed
- Umar Gul
- Sarfaraz Ahmed
- Moin Khan
- Saqlain Mushtaq
