= Peshawar cricket team =

Pakistani first-class cricket team

Personnel
- Owner: Pakistan Cricket Board

Team information
- Founded: 2023; 3 years ago
- Home ground: Imran Khan Cricket Stadium

The Peshawar cricket team is a Pakistani first-class cricket team from Peshawar. The team's home ground is Arbab Niaz Stadium, Peshawar. They participate in the Quaid-e-Azam Trophy. It was refounded in the 2023/24 season after a revamp of the domestic structure.

== History ==
=== Before 2023 ===
The List A and Twenty20 side was known as the Peshawar Panthers.

Peshawar first played in first-class competitions in 1956–57, and they have competed in most seasons since then, except for a hiatus between 1977–78 and 1983–84. Apart from a few matches played by North-West Frontier Province in the 1970s, Peshawar was usually the only first-class team from Khyber Pakhtunkhwa province (formerly known as North-West Frontier Province) until the debut of Abbottabad in 2005–06.

Peshawar won the Quaid-i-Azam Trophy in 1998-99 and 2004–05, and the ABN-AMRO Cup National One-day Championship in 2006–07. They also won the 2011-12 Quaid-e-Azam Trophy Division Two.

In first-class cricket to the end of 2013 they had played 262 matches, with 82 wins, 99 losses, 80 draws and one tie. Their highest individual score is 300 not out, by Shoaib Khan against Quetta in 2003–04. Their best bowling figures are 9 for 62 by Safiullah Khan against Railways B in 1971–72.

In List A cricket they have played 73 times, with 22 wins, 49 losses, one tie and one no-result.

In January 2017, they won the 2016–17 Regional One Day Cup, beating Karachi Whites by 124 runs in the final.

=== Since 2023 ===
In 2023, the Peshawar cricket team was refounded as part of the restructuring of the Pakistani domestic system.

== Current squad ==
Players with international caps are listed in bold. List of players to have played for the First XI in First Class Cricket in the 2023-24 Season

Name	Birth date	Batting style	Bowling style	Notes
Batsmen
Abbas Ali	8 April 2004 (age 19)	Right-handed	Right-arm off spin	
Abuzar Tariq	2 July 2001 (age 22)	Right-handed		
Adil Amin	13 December 1990 (age 32)	Right-handed	Right-arm off spin	
Israrullah	15 May 1992 (age 31)	Left-handed		
Maaz Sadaqat	15 May 2005 (age 18)	Left-handed	Slow left-arm orthodox	
Mehran Ibrahim	20 November 1993 (age 29)	Right-handed		
Nabi Gul	1 March 1998 (age 25)	Right-handed		
Niaz Khan	12 December 2001 (age 21)	Right-handed	Right-arm medium	
**Sahibzada Farhan**	6 March 1996 (age 27)	Right-handed		
Waqar Ahmed	1 January 2000 (age 23)	Right-handed	Right-arm medium	
Zain Khan	24 October 2002 (age 20)	Right-handed	Right-arm medium	
All-Rounders
**Kamran Ghulam**	10 October 1995 (age 28)	Right-handed	Slow left-arm orthodox	
**Sajid Khan**	3 September 1993 (age 30)	Right-handed	Right-arm off spin	
Wicket-keepers
Gauhar Ali	5 May 1989 (age 34)	Right-handed		
Spin Bowlers
Ubaid Shah	5 February 2005 (age 19)	Right-handed	Right-arm leg spin	
Pace Bowlers
Abbas Afridi (cricketer)	5 April 2001 (age 22)	Right-handed	Right-arm medium-fast	
Mohammad Amir Khan	9 September 2001 (age 22)	Right-handed	Right-arm medium	
Mohammad Ilyas	21 March 1999 (age 24)	Right-handed	Right-arm medium-fast	
Imran Khan	15 July 1987 (age 36)	Right-handed	Right-arm medium-fast	
Mohammad Imran	20 January 2001 (age 22)	Right-handed	Left-arm medium-fast	
Taj Wali	21 March 1991 (age 32)	Left-handed	Left-arm medium-fast	
