= Quetta cricket team =

Cricket team

Quetta is a first-class cricket team based in Quetta, Balochistan, Pakistan. Quetta has participated in the Quaid-e-Azam Trophy irregularly since 1957–58. For Twenty20 and List A cricket they are sometimes known as the Quetta Bears and have participated in the Faysal Bank T20 Cup and National One-day Championship.

Quetta played their first first-class matches in the Quaid-e-Azam Trophy in 1957–58. They reached the quarter-finals in 1962–63 and 1963–64, and continued playing in the Quaid-e-Azam Trophy until 1969–70. They also took part in first-class matches between 1962–63 and 1986–87 for the Ayub Trophy, the BCCP Trophy, the BCCP Patron's Trophy, and the BCCP President's Cup.

Quetta played no first-class matches between January 1987 and February 2004, when they once again began to take part in the Quaid-e-Azam Trophy. After another hiatus they returned to first-class level in the 2024–25 Quaid-e-Azam Trophy. Their home ground is Bugti Stadium (formerly known as the Racecourse Ground) in Quetta, although for security reasons few first-class matches are played in Balochistan.

Quetta have usually been one of the weaker teams in Pakistan cricket. To the end of 2024 they have played 141 first-class matches for 22 wins, 81 losses and 38 draws. Their highest individual score is 237 by Fasihuddin in 1962–63, and the best bowling figures are 8 for 50 by Gohar Faiz in 2012–13.
