= Multan cricket team =

Pakistani first-class cricket team

Personnel
- Captain: Naseem Shah
- Coach: Taimur Azam
- Owner: Pakistan Cricket Board; Multan Sultans

Team information
- Founded: 2023; 2 years ago
- Home ground: Multan Cricket Stadium

The Multan cricket team is a first-class cricket team based in Multan, Punjab, Pakistan. Their home ground is the Multan Cricket Stadium. They participate in the Quaid-e-Azam Trophy. It was refounded in the 2023/24 season after a revamp of the domestic structure.

== History ==
=== Before 2023 ===
For List A and Twenty20 cricket the team were known as the Multan Tigers and they participated in the various Pakistan List A competitions and in the Faysal Bank T20 Cup.

They played first-class cricket in most seasons since 1958–59. At the end of 2013 they had played 205 first-class matches, with 40 wins, 89 losses and 76 draws. Their highest individual score is 225 by Aamer Yamin against Quetta in 2013–14. Their best innings bowling figures are 10 for 143 by Zulfiqar Babar against Islamabad in 2009–10.

=== Since 2023 ===
In 2023, the Multan cricket team was refounded as part of the restructuring of the Pakistani domestic system.

== Current Squad ==
Players with international caps are listed in bold. List of players to have played for the First XI in first class cricket in the 2023-24 season.

Name	Birth date	Batting style	Bowling style	Notes
Batsmen
Zain Abbas	2 November 1991 (age 31)	Left-handed	Right-arm bowler	
Sharoon Siraj	14 September 1997 (age 26)			
Mohammad Basit Ali	25 December 2000 (age 22)	Right-handed		
Imran Rafiq	3 November 1996 (age 26)	Left-handed		
Hamayun Altaf	5 March 1999 (age 24)	Right-handed		
Saim Ayyaz	12 August 2000 (age 23)	Right-handed	Right-arm off spin	
Yousuf Babar	10 December 1997 (age 25)	Left-handed		
Farhan Sarfraz	22 December 1995 (age 27)	Left-handed		
All-Rounders
**Aamer Yamin**	26 June 1990 (age 33)	Right-handed	Right-arm medium	
Mohammad Imran	25 December 1996 (age 26)	Right-handed	Right-arm medium	
Wicket-keepers
Haseebullah Khan	20 March 2003 (age 20)	Left-handed		
Rameez Alam	7 December 1988 (age 34)	Right-handed	Right-arm off spin	
Zeeshan Ashraf	11 May 1992 (age 31)	Left-handed	Right-arm off spin	
Spin Bowlers
Ali Usman	6 June 1993 (age 30)	Right-handed	Slow left-arm orthodox	
**Zahid Mahmood**	20 March 1988 (age 35)	Right-handed	Right-arm leg spin	
Pace Bowlers
Majid Ali	19 July 1994 (age 29)	Right-handed	Left-arm medium-fast	
Sirajuddin	2 January 2002 (age 21)	Right-handed	Right-arm medium	
Tahir Hussain	20 December 2002 (age 20)	Left-handed	Left-arm medium	
