= 2012–13 President's Trophy =

Cricket competition

President's Trophy 2012–13
- Dates: 3 October 2012 – 14 January 2013
- Administrator: Pakistan Cricket Board
- Cricket format: First-class cricket (4 days)
- Tournament format(s): Round-robin and final
- Host: Pakistan
- Champions: Sui Northern Gas Pipelines Limited (1st title)
- Participants: 10
- Matches: 46
- Most runs: Umar Amin (767)
- Most wickets: Zulfiqar Babar (62)
- Official website: http://www.pcb.com.pk

The 2012–13 President's Trophy was one of two first-class cricket competitions that were held in Pakistan during the 2012–13 season, the other being the Quaid-e-Azam Trophy. It was the inaugural edition of the President's Trophy. Ten departmental teams (Note: Cricket in Pakistan is played by teams representing associations or regions and departments; departmental teams are affiliated to corporations, institutions or government departments.) each played nine 4-day matches in a round-robin league phase between 3 October and 7 December 2012, with the top two teams contesting the final on 11–14 January 2013.

Sui Northern Gas Pipelines Limited went undefeated in claiming the title, winning six of their nine group matches and beating Habib Bank Limited in the final.

== Background ==
Before the start of the 2012–13 season, the Pakistan Cricket Board restructured the domestic system by separating the regional and department sides, who had both competed in the Quaid-e-Azam Trophy over the previous seasons, with the departments moving into a new President's Trophy competition and the regions remaining in the Quaid-e-Azam Trophy.

== Format ==
In 2012–13 season of the President's Trophy, ten departmental teams each played nine 4-day matches in a round-robin league phase, with the top two teams contesting the final.

== Group stage ==
=== Points Table ===
Teams	Pld	W	L	T	D	NR	Pts
Sui Northern Gas Pipelines Limited	9	6	0	0	3	0	57
Habib Bank Limited	9	6	1	0	2	0	51
Khan Research Laboratories	9	4	3	0	2	0	39
Pakistan International Airlines	9	4	2	0	3	0	33
Zarai Taraqiati Bank	9	4	4	0	1	0	33
Water and Power Development Authority	9	3	3	0	3	0	33
National Bank of Pakistan	9	3	4	0	2	0	27
State Bank of Pakistan	9	2	4	0	3	0	18
Port Qasim Authority	9	2	5	0	2	0	15
United Bank Limited	9	0	8	0	1	0	3

The order in the table is determined by total points, followed by number of matches won, fewest matches lost, and then net run rate.

Points Allocation
- Win = 9 points
- Win after being behind or tied on 1st innings = 6 points
- Tie after leading on 1st innings = 5 points
- Tie after being behind on 1st innings = 2 points
- Draw after leading on 1st innings = 3 points
- Draw after being tied on 1st innings = 2 points
- Draw after being behind on 1st innings = 0 points
- Loss = 0 points
- Abandoned without any play or no decision on 1st innings = 0 points

=== Results ===
==== Round 1 ====
Report

3–6 October	National Bank of Pakistan	v	Habib Bank Limited	Habib Bank Limited won by 5 wickets
Scorecard	329 (99 overs); Fawad Alam 113 (172); Ehsan Adil 4/102 (27 overs)		318 (92 overs); Imran Farhat 88 (116); Mohammad Imran 3/78 (21 overs)	Gaddafi Stadium, Lahore; Umpires: Zameer Haider and Ahmed Shahab
Scorecard	184 (56 overs); Bilal Munir 39 (84); Mohammad Aslam 4/32 (18 overs)		198/5 (56.2 overs); Kamran Hussain 50 (78); Mohammad Imran 3/43 (15 overs)	Gaddafi Stadium, Lahore; Umpires: Zameer Haider and Ahmed Shahab
Habib Bank Limited won the toss and elected to field.; Habib Bank Limited 6 points, National Bank of Pakistan 0 points; First-class debuts: Ehsan Adil (HBL), Mohammad Nawaz and Sami Aslam (NBP)

3–6 October	Khan Research Laboratories	v	Zarai Taraqiati Bank	Khan Research Laboratories won by an innings and 117 runs
Scorecard	496 (138.4 overs); Shoaib Ahmed 152 (230); Zohaib Khan 3/113 (42 overs)		194 (54.3 overs); Babar Azam 74 (145); Mohammad Irfan 4/73 (13.3 overs)	Jinnah Stadium, Sialkot; Umpires: Qaiser Waheed and Sajid Afridi
Scorecard			185 f/o (54.3 overs); Zohaib Khan 50 (59); Nayyer Abbas 5/75 (21 overs)	Jinnah Stadium, Sialkot; Umpires: Qaiser Waheed and Sajid Afridi
Zarai Taraqiati Bank Limited won the toss and elected to field.; Khan Research Laboratories 9 points, Zarai Taraqiati Bank Limited 0 points; First-class debuts: Tayyab Riaz (KRL)

3–6 October	Pakistan International Airlines	v	State Bank of Pakistan	Match drawn
Scorecard	321 (93.4 overs); Faisal Iqbal\ 100 (127); Mohammad Ali 3/57 (22 overs)		338 (112.2 overs); Usman Arshad 113 (206); Akhtar Waheed 3/76 (23 overs)	National Stadium, Karachi; Umpires: Kamal Merchant and Saleem Badar
Scorecard	261/4d (82 overs); Sarfraz Ahmed 66* (109); Hasan Mahmood 2/83 (35)		92/2 (26 overs); Usman Arshad 53* (65); Najaf Shah 1/8 (3 overs)	National Stadium, Karachi; Umpires: Kamal Merchant and Saleem Badar
State Bank of Pakistan won the toss and elected to field.; State Bank of Pakistan 3 points, Pakistan International Airlines 0 points

3–6 October	United Bank Limited	v	Port Qasim Authority	Match drawn
Scorecard	323 (101.5 overs); Ali Asad 59 (212); Mohammad Talha 4/83 (21 overs)		237 (88.5 overs); Khurram Manzoor 62 (211); Kashif Bhatti 2/55 (31 overs)	National Bank of Pakistan Sports Complex, Karachi; Umpires: Riazuddin and Khalid Mahmood
Scorecard	225/8d (72.1 overs); Imran Ali 50 (81); Azam Hussain 5/63 (22.1 overs)		232/6 (55 overs); Umar Amin 71 (100); Kashif Bhatti 5/105 (24 overs)	National Bank of Pakistan Sports Complex, Karachi; Umpires: Riazuddin and Khalid Mahmood
Port Qasim Authority won the toss and elected to field.; United Bank Limited 3 points, Port Qasim Authority 0 points

3–6 October	Water and Power Development Authority	v	Sui Northern Gas Pipelines Limited	Sui Northern Gas Pipelines Limited won by 3 wickets
Scorecard	200 (93.3 overs); Sohaib Maqsood 95 (173); Asad Ali 3/53 (23 overs)		266 (93 overs); Mohammad Rizwan 68 (136); Zulfiqar Babar 5/56 (31 overs)	Iqbal Stadium, Faisalabad; Umpires: Nadeem Ghauri and Majid Hussain
Scorecard	180 (60 overs); Waqar Ahmed 34 (75); Asad Ali 4/79 (20 overs)		115/7 (38.5 overs); Taufeeq Umar 32 (51); Junaid Khan 4/41 (11.5 overs)	Iqbal Stadium, Faisalabad; Umpires: Nadeem Ghauri and Majid Hussain
Sui Northern Gas Pipelines Limited won the toss and elected to field.; Sui Northern Gas Pipelines Limited 9 points, Water and Power Development Authority 0 points

==== Round 2 ====
Report

9–12 October	Habib Bank Limited	v	Water and Power Development Authority	Habib Bank Limited won by 184 runs
Scorecard	288 (95.5 overs); Shan Masood 94 (186); Junaid Khan 6/79 (26 overs)		235 (74 overs); Bilal Khilj 75 (145); Ehsan Adil 4/64 (19 overs)	Gaddafi Stadium, Lahore; Umpires: Tahir Shah and Ehtesham-ul-Haq
Scorecard	282 (84 overs); Hasan Raza 57 (107); Zulfiqar Babar 4/71 (27 overs)		151 (54.5 overs); Mohammad Ibrahim; Ehsan Adil 5/39 (11.5 overs)	Gaddafi Stadium, Lahore; Umpires: Tahir Shah and Ehtesham-ul-Haq
Water and Power Development Authority won the toss and elected to field.; Habib Bank Limited 9 points, Water and Power Development Authority 0 points

9–12 October	Sui Northern Gas Pipelines Limited	v	Khan Research Laboratories	Sui Northern Gas Pipelines Limited won by 219 runs
Scorecard	291 (95.1 overs); Mohammad Hafeez 68 (154); Yasir Ali 3/38 (17 overs)		183 (74.1 overs); Saeed Anwar 32 (85); Samiullah Khan 6/48 (18.1 overs)	Iqbal Stadium, Faisalabad; Umpires: Majid Hussain and Nadeem Iqbal
Scorecard	195/4d (59 overs); Mohammad Hafeez 95 (141); Rahat Ali 1/23 (10 overs)		84 (37 overs); Zulfiqar Jan 28 (34); Yasir Shah 6/30 (10 overs)	Iqbal Stadium, Faisalabad; Umpires: Majid Hussain and Nadeem Iqbal
Khan Research Laboratories won the toss and elected to field.; Sui Northern Gas Pipelines Limited 9 points, Khan Research Laboratories 0 points

9–12 October	Zarai Taraqiati Bank	v	National Bank of Pakistan	Zarai Taraqiati Bank Limited won by 84 runs
Scorecard	372 (101.4 overs); Sharjeel Khan 121 (104); Uzair-ul-Haq 4/82 (19 overs)		222 (64 overs); Sami Aslam 50 (96); Mohammad Khalil 4/43 (16 overs)	Jinnah Stadium, Sialkot; Umpires: Ahmed Shahab and Sajid Afridi
Scorecard	239/8d (63 overs); Afaq Raheem 92 (173); Wahab Riaz 3/47 (16 overs)		305 (80.1 overs); Fawad Alam 112* (146); Zohaib Khan 3/87 (22 overs)	Jinnah Stadium, Sialkot; Umpires: Ahmed Shahab and Sajid Afridi
Zarai Taraqiati Bank Limited won the toss and elected to bat.; Zarai Taraqiati Bank Limited 9 points, National Bank of Pakistan 0 points

9–12 October	Port Qasim Authority	v	State Bank of Pakistan	State Bank of Pakistan won by 6 wickets
Scorecard	218 (92.4 overs); Shahzaib Hasan 60 (150); Hasan Mahmood 4/59 (28 overs)		180 (45.4 overs); Gulraiz Sadaf 50 (82); Abdur Rauf 4/56 (12 overs)	National Stadium, Karachi; Umpires: Saleem Badar and Kamal Merchant
Scorecard	160 (54.1 overs); Mohammad Salman 64 (109); Hasan Mahmood 4/17 (10.1 overs)		202/4 (37.1 overs); Kashif Siddiq 73 (53); Tanvir Ahmed 4/63 (13 overs)	National Stadium, Karachi; Umpires: Saleem Badar and Kamal Merchant
Port Qasim Authority won the toss and elected to bat.; State Bank of Pakistan 6 points, Port Qasim Authority 0 points

9–12 October	Pakistan International Airlines	v	United Bank Limited	Pakistan International Airlines won by 69 runs
Scorecard	214 (78.1 overs); Sarfraz Ahmed 75 (105); Kashif Bhatti 3/51 (24.1 overs)		125 (57.4 overs); Ali Asad 36* (83); Aizaz Cheema 3/19 (12 overs)	United Bank Limited Sports Complex, Karachi; Umpires: Riazuddin and Khalid Mahmood
Scorecard	222 (68.2 overs); Kamran Sajid 62 (168); Shabbir Ahmed 4/22 (14 overs)		242/3 (80.1 overs); Saad Sukhail 93 (198); Aizaz Cheema 3/27 (14 overs)	United Bank Limited Sports Complex, Karachi; Umpires: Riazuddin and Khalid Mahmood
United Bank Limited won the toss and elected to field.; Pakistan International Airlines 9 points, United Bank Limited 0 points

==== Round 3 ====
Report

15–18 October	Habib Bank Limited	v	Zarai Taraqiati Bank	Habib Bank Limited won by 9 wickets
Scorecard	249 (64.3 overs); Ahmed Shehzad 55 (83); Saeed Ajmal 6/64 (18 overs)		106 (39.5 overs); Yasir Hameed 23 (44); Ehsan Adil 5/41 (12.5 overs)	Gaddafi Stadium, Lahore; Umpires: Ghaffar Kazmi and Qaiser Waheed
Scorecard	28/1 (6.1 overs); Shan Masood 18* (14)		168 (44.5 overs); Babar Azam 45* (101); Fahad Masood 4/37 (11.5 overs)	Gaddafi Stadium, Lahore; Umpires: Ghaffar Kazmi and Qaiser Waheed
Habib Bank Limited won the toss and elected to field.; Rain prevented play on Day 1; Habib Bank Limited 9 points, Zarai Taraqiati Bank Limited 0 points

15–18 October	Khan Research Laboratories	v	Water and Power Development Authority	Match drawn
Scorecard	331/9d (135.2 overs); Naved Yasin 89 (188); Zulfiqar Babar 6/108 (47.2 overs)		162 (83.5 overs); Sohaib Maqsood 74 (175); Rahat Ali 3/36 (18 overs)	Iqbal Stadium, Faisalabad; Umpires: Majid Hussain and Zameer Haider
Water and Power Development Authority won the toss and elected to field; Rain prevented play on Day 1; Khan Research Laboratories 3 points, Water and Power Development Authority 0 points

15–18 October	National Bank of Pakistan	v	Sui Northern Gas Pipelines Limited	Match drawn
Scorecard	343 (97.3 overs); Fawad Alam 93 (114); Yasir Shah 3/31 (9 overs)		195 (55.3 overs); Mohammad Hafeez 43 (52); Uzair-ul-Haq 6/58 (17.3 overs)	Jinnah Stadium, Sialkot; Umpires: Ahmed Shahab and Sajid Afridi
Scorecard			252/9 (118 overs); Umar Akmal 48 (68); Mohammad Imran 6/68 (26 overs)	Jinnah Stadium, Sialkot; Umpires: Ahmed Shahab and Sajid Afridi
National Bank of Pakistan won the toss and elected to field.; Play on Day 1 was reduced due to rain and bad light.; National Bank of Pakistan 3 points, Sui Northern Gas Pipelines Limited 0 points

15–18 October	Pakistan International Airlines	v	Port Qasim Authority	Pakistan International Airlines won by 113 runs
Scorecard	334 (110.3 overs); Shoaib Khan 67 (183); Mohammad Sami 7/61 (23.3 overs)		278 (72.2 overs); Umar Amin 61 (77); Najaf Shah 5/63 (21 overs)	National Stadium, Karachi; Umpires: Kamal Merchant and Saleem Badar
Scorecard	171 (62 overs); Sheharyar Ghani 39 (97); Abdur Rauf 4/39 (16 overs)		114 (27.1 overs); Shahzaib Hasan 47 (65); Najaf Shah 5/44 (11 overs)	National Stadium, Karachi; Umpires: Kamal Merchant and Saleem Badar
Port Qasim Authority won the toss and elected to field.; Pakistan International Airlines 9 points, Port Qasim Authority 0 points

15–18 October	United Bank Limited	v	State Bank of Pakistan	State Bank of Pakistan won by 4 wickets
Scorecard	252 (98 overs); Mohammad Sami 71* (184); Adnan Rasool 5/50 (30 overs)		369 (109.4 overs); Adnan Raees 115 (243); Akhtar Ayub 3/68 (21.4 overs)	United Bank Limited Sports Complex, Karachi; Umpires: Khalid Mahmood and Riazuddin
Scorecard	218 (94.2 overs); Abid Ali 94 (269); Hasan Mahmood 4/44 (35 overs)		105/6 (28.1 overs); Gulraiz Sadaf 26 (46); Mohammad Sami 2/25 (5.1 overs)	United Bank Limited Sports Complex, Karachi; Umpires: Khalid Mahmood and Riazuddin
State Bank of Pakistan won the toss and elected to field.; State Bank of Pakistan 9 points, United Bank Limited 0 points; Fahim Qureshi (United Bank Limited)

==== Round 4 ====
Report

21–24 October	Habib Bank Limited	v	State Bank of Pakistan	Habib Bank Limited won by 129 runs
Scorecard	327 (104.1 overs); Younis Khan 101 (202); Kashif Siddiq 4/39 (12.1 overs)		198 (81.5 overs); Usman Saeed 50 (112); Ahmed Shehzad 4/7 (2.5 overs)	Iqbal Stadium, Faisalabad; Umpires: Zameer Haider and Shozab Raza
Scorecard	148/5 (35 overs); Younis Khan 50 (71); Saad Altaf 3/64 (18 overs)		148 (58.4 overs); Mohtashim Ali 46 (109); Aftab Alam 4/39 (16 overs)	Iqbal Stadium, Faisalabad; Umpires: Zameer Haider and Shozab Raza
Habib Bank Limited won the toss and elected to bat.; Habib Bank Limited 9 points, State Bank of Pakistan 0 points

21–24 October	National Bank of Pakistan	v	Pakistan International Airlines	Match drawn
Scorecard	323 (83 overs); Qaiser Abbas 106 (166); Aizaz Cheema 4/81 (25 overs)		341 (101.3 overs); Shoaib Khan 121* (203); Qaiser Abbas 3/45 (18.3 overs)	Gaddafi Stadium, Lahore; Umpires: Ahsan Raza and Akram Raza
Scorecard	428 (120.2 overs); Amin-ur-Rehman 137 (168); Anwar Ali 5/115 (26.2 overs)		10/1 (2 overs); Shehzar Mohammad 6* (5); Imran Khan 1/9 (1 overs)	Gaddafi Stadium, Lahore; Umpires: Ahsan Raza and Akram Raza
Pakistan International Airlines won the toss and elected field.; First-class debut: Faraz Ali (Pakistan International Airlines); Pakistan International Airlines 3 points, National Bank of Pakistan 0 points

21–24 October	Port Qasim Authority	v	Sui Northern Gas Pipelines Limited	Sui Northern Gas Pipelines Limited won by 32 runs
Scorecard	244 (76.3 overs); Daniyal Ahsan 61 (114); Imran Ali 4/52 (18.3 overs)		266 (69.2 overs); Mohammad Rizwan 91 (117); Azam Hussain 4/41 (10.2 overs)	Jinnah Stadium, Sialkot; Umpires: Aftab Gillani and Raweed Khan
Scorecard	215 (73.1 overs); Umar Amin 28* (44); Mohammad Hafeez 4/37 (22.1 overs)		225 (67.1 overs); Taufeeq Umar 82 (178); Azam Hussain 6/50 (19.1 overs)	Jinnah Stadium, Sialkot; Umpires: Aftab Gillani and Raweed Khan
Port Qasim Authority won the toss and elected to field.; Sui Northern Gas Pipelines Limited 9 points, Port Qasim Authority 0 points

21–24 October	United Bank Limited	v	Khan Research Laboratories	Khan Research Laboratories won by 4 wickets
Scorecard	319 (111.5 overs); Abid Ali 130 (268); Mohammad Irfan 4/82 (30.5 overs)		290 (86 overs); Saeed Anwar 86 (183); Mohammad Irshad 5/94 (32 overs)	Khan Research Laboratory Ground, Rawalpindi; Umpires: Ahmed Shahab and Nadeem Iqbal
Scorecard	143 (64 overs); Kashif Bhatti 33 (43); Mohammad Irfan 3/32 (20 overs)		176/6 (39.4 overs); Bazid Khan 76 (76); Mohammad Irshad 3/61 (17 overs)	Khan Research Laboratory Ground, Rawalpindi; Umpires: Ahmed Shahab and Nadeem Iqbal
Khan Research Laboratories won the toss and elected to field; Khan Research Laboratories 6 points, United Bank Limited 0 points

21–24 October	Water and Power Development Authority	v	Zarai Taraqiati Bank	Match drawn
Scorecard	294 (84.4 overs); Sohaib Maqsood 110 (140); Abdul Razzaq 5/58 (19 overs)		283 (87.3 overs); Haris Sohail 115* (198); Nawaz Sardar 4/38 (9.3 overs)	Sports Stadium, Sargodha; Umpires: Ehtesham-ul-Haq and Tahir Shah
Scorecard	259 (89 overs); Aamer Sajjad 90 (126); Saeed Ajmal 6/56 (28 overs)		158/5 (57 overs); Haris Sohail 58* (106); Zulfiqar Babar 2/67 (25 overs)	Sports Stadium, Sargodha; Umpires: Ehtesham-ul-Haq and Tahir Shah
Zarai Taraqiati Bank Limited won the toss and elected to field; Water and Power Development Authority 3 points, Zarai Taraqiati Bank Limited 0 points

==== Round 5 ====
2–5 November	Habib Bank Limited	v	Pakistan International Airlines	Pakistan International Airlines won by 6 wickets
Scorecard	200 (76 overs); Shan Masood 42 (128); Aizaz Cheema 4/33 (21 overs)		172 (58.5 overs); Shoaib Malik 56 (170); Fahad Masood 6/33 (19.5)	Jinnah Stadium, Sialkot; Umpires: Ahsan Raza and Shozab Raza
Scorecard	147 (51.4 overs); Aftab Alam; Najaf Shah 5/38 (21 overs)		176/4 (53 overs); Shoaib Malik 94* (195); Fahad Masood 3/23 (17 overs)	Jinnah Stadium, Sialkot; Umpires: Ahsan Raza and Shozab Raza
Habib Bank Limited won the toss and elected to bat; Pakistan International Airlines 6 points, Habib Bank Limited 0 points

2–5 November	Khan Research Laboratories	v	State Bank of Pakistan	Match drawn
Scorecard	311 (107.2 overs); Yasir Arafat 80 (260); Ansar Javed 4/56 (20 overs)		188 (79.3 overs); Mohtashim Ali 70* (184); Nauman Ali 4/62 (30 overs)	Iqbal Stadium, Faisalabad; Umpires: Akmal Hayat and Nadeem Iqbal
Scorecard	183/5d (58 overs); Zain Abbas 76 (164); Zain Abbas 3/66 (20 overs)		207/4 (73 overs); Farrukh Shehzad 73 (205); Mohammad Irfan 2/47 (12 overs)	Iqbal Stadium, Faisalabad; Umpires: Akmal Hayat and Nadeem Iqbal
Khan Research Laboratories won the toss and elected to bat; Khan Research Laboratories 3 points, State Bank of Pakistan 0 points

2–5 November 2012	National Bank of Pakistan	v	Port Qasim Authority	National Bank of Pakistan won by 2 wickets
Scorecard	117 (27.2 overs); Sami Aslam 32 (56); Tanvir Ahmed 7/41 (9.2 overs)		150 (52.3 overs); Asim Kamal 30 (75); Imran Khan 6/40 (17.3 overs)	Gaddafi Stadium, Lahore; Umpires: Ahmed Shahab and Majid Hussain
Scorecard	211/8 (48.4 overs); Umair Khan 54 (107); Tanvir Ahmed 5/100 (19 overs)		177 (41.2 overs); Daniyal Ahsan 45 (68); Umaid Asif 5/55 (12.2 overs)	Gaddafi Stadium, Lahore; Umpires: Ahmed Shahab and Majid Hussain
Port Qasim Authority won the toss and elected to bat; National Bank of Pakistan 6 points, Port Qasim Authority 0 points

2–5 November	Sui Northern Gas Pipelines Limited	v	Zarai Taraqiati Bank	Sui Northern Gas Pipelines Limited won by 186 runs
Scorecard	250 (87.3 overs); Misbah-ul-Haq 110 (200); Abdul Razzaq 6/74 (23.3)		99 (32.3 overs); Zohaib Khan 21Not out (65); Samiullah Khan 6/31 (16 overs)	Rawalpindi Cricket Stadium, Rawalpindi; Umpires: Ahsan Raza and Sajid Afridi
Scorecard	256/2d (79 overs); Azhar Ali 129 (266); Sohail Tanvir 1/34 (15 overs)		221 (60.1 overs); Haris Sohail 117* (112); Samiullah Khan 4/56 (13.1 overs)	Rawalpindi Cricket Stadium, Rawalpindi; Umpires: Ahsan Raza and Sajid Afridi
Zarai Taraqiati Bank Limited won the toss and elected to field; Sui Northern Gas Pipelines Limited 9 points, Zarai Taraqiati Bank Limited 0 points

2–5 November	United Bank Limited	v	Water and Power Development Authority	Water and Power Development Authority won by an innings and 109 runs
Scorecard	121 (39.2 overs); Kashif Bhatti 39 (34); Zulfiqar Babar 3/15 (5 overs)		321 (100.1 overs); Kaleem Ahmed 70 (170); Rumman Raees 4/66 (25.1)	Sports Stadium, Sargodha; Umpires: Saqib Khan and Tahir Shah
Scorecard	91 (24.5 overs); Ali Asad 36 (39); Zulfiqar Babar 3/18 (6.5 overs)			Sports Stadium, Sargodha; Umpires: Saqib Khan and Tahir Shah
Water and Power Development Authority won the toss and elected to field; Water and Power Development Authority 9 points and United Bank Limited 0 points

PIA v HBL, KRL v SBP and ZTBL v SNGPL Report
NBP v PQA Report
WAPDA v UBL Report

==== Round 6 ====
8–11 November	Habib Bank Limited	v	Khan Research Laboratories	Habib Bank Limited won by 65 runs
Scorecard	161 (53.5 overs); Ehsan Adil 31 (51); Ali Khan 4/52 (13 overs)		253 (68.4 overs); Naved Yasin 40 (90); Ehsan Adil 6/58 (15.4 overs)	Khan Research Laboratory Ground, Rawalpindi; Umpires: Akmal Hayat and Kamal Merchant
Scorecard	399/8d (109 overs); Imran Farhat 102 (91); Nauman Ali 3/97 (31 overs)		242 (53.1 overs); Shoaib Ahmed 60 (106); Abdul Ameer 7/66 (19 overs)	Khan Research Laboratory Ground, Rawalpindi; Umpires: Akmal Hayat and Kamal Merchant
Khan Research Laboratories won the toss and elected to field; Habib Bank Limited 6 points, Khan Research Laboratories 0 points

8–11 November	National Bank of Pakistan	v	State Bank of Pakistan	National Bank of Pakistan won by an innings and 31 runs
Scorecard	304 (93.1 overs); Sami Aslam 89 (199); Saad Altaf 5/75 (23 overs)		136 (47.1 overs); Kashif Siddiq 27 (49); Wahab Riaz 7/29 (14.1 overs)	Gaddafi Stadium, Lahore; Umpires: Ahsan Raza and Shozab Raza
Scorecard			137(f/o) (45.4 overs); Mohtashim Ali 28 (52); Hammad Azam 3/13 (10 overs)	Gaddafi Stadium, Lahore; Umpires: Ahsan Raza and Shozab Raza
State Bank of Pakistan won the toss and elected to field; National Bank of Pakistan 9 points, State Bank of Pakistan 0 points

8–11 November	Pakistan International Airlines	v	Zarai Taraqiati Bank	Pakistan International Airlines won by 4 wickets
Scorecard	152 (45.5 overs); Jannisar Khan 28 (85); Mohammad Khalil 5/62 (15.5 overs)		212 (83.3 overs); Haris Sohail 120 (345); Najaf Shah 4/63 (21.3 overs)	Diamond Club Ground, Islamabad; Umpires: Qaiser Waheed and Riazuddin
Scorecard	192/6 (40 overs); Faisal Iqbal 44 (21); Mohammad Khalil 4/77 (14 overs)		131 (42.1 overs); Sohail Tanvir 31 (41); Aizaz Cheema 4/55 (12.1 overs)	Diamond Club Ground, Islamabad; Umpires: Qaiser Waheed and Riazuddin
Pakistan International Airlines won the toss and elected to field; Pakistan International Airlines 6 points, Zarai Taraqiati Bank Limited 0 points

8–11 November	Port Qasim Authority	v	Water and Power Development Authority	Port Qasim Authority won by 17 runs
Scorecard	215 (59.5 overs); Tanvir Ahmed 46 (64); Junaid Khan 5/68 (19 overs)		271 (89 overs); Ali Azmat 61 (116); Azam Hussain 4/68 (32 overs)	Iqbal Stadium, Faisalabad; Umpires: Ghaffar Kazmi and Saleem Badar
Scorecard	173 (55 overs); Mohammad Salman 36 (90); Zulfiqar Babar 5/40 (21 overs)		100 (39.2 overs); Sohaib Maqsood 20 (24); Tanvir Ahmed 4/12 (4.2 overs)	Iqbal Stadium, Faisalabad; Umpires: Ghaffar Kazmi and Saleem Badar
Port Qasim Authority won the toss and elected to bat; Port Qasim Authority 6 points, Water and Power Development Authority 0 points

8–11 November	Sui Northern Gas Pipelines Limited	v	United Bank Limited	Sui Northern Gas Pipelines Limited won by an innings and 216 runs
Scorecard	455/5d (116 overs); Mohammad Hafeez 193 (301); Shabbir Ahmed 2/49 (24 overs)		165 (47.1 overs); Abid Ali 82 (150); Mohammad Hafeez 4/13 (7 overs)	Rawalpindi Cricket Stadium, Rawalpindi; Umpires: Nadeem Iqbal and Saqib Khan
Scorecard			74 (16.3 overs); Faisal Athar 28 (38); Ali Asad 7/42 (8 overs)	Rawalpindi Cricket Stadium, Rawalpindi; Umpires: Nadeem Iqbal and Saqib Khan
Sui Northern Gas Pipelines Limited won the toss and elected to field; Sui Northern Gas Pipelines Limited 9 points, United Bank Limited 0 points; First-class debut: Zubair Khan (United Bank Limited)

Report

==== Round 7 ====
14–17 November	Habib Bank Limited	v	United Bank Limited	Habib Bank Limited won by 251 runs
Scorecard	193 (44.3 overs); Humayun Farhat 79 (81); Rumman Raees 5/70 (17 overs)		141 (37 overs); Imran Ali 50* (93); Ehsan Adil 4/28 (10 overs)	Rawalpindi Cricket Stadium, Rawalpindi; Umpires: Ghaffar Kazmi and Riazuddin
Scorecard	376/8d (96.4 overs); Younus Khan 133 (217); Shabbir Ahmed 4/100 (28.4 overs)		177 (50.3 overs); Kashif Bhatti 38 (42); Umar Gul 5/42 (15 overs)	Rawalpindi Cricket Stadium, Rawalpindi; Umpires: Ghaffar Kazmi and Riazuddin
United Bank Limited won the toss and elected to field; Habib Bank Limited 9 points, United Bank Limited 0 points

14–17 November	Khan Research Laboratories	v	Port Qasim Authority	Port Qasim Authority won by 6 wickets
Scorecard	289 (92.1 overs); Zulfiqar Jan 50 (107); Ahmed Jamal 3/46 (16 overs)		344 (93.1 overs); Khurram Manzoor 152 (276); Ali Khan 3/42 (11.1 overs)	Khan Research Laboratory Ground, Rawalpindi; Umpires: Raweed Khan and Saqib Khan
Scorecard	136 (33.1 overs); Tayyab Riaz 44 (35); Tanvir Ahmed 4/37 (11.1 overs)		83/4 (22 overs); Khurram Manzoor 22* (54); Yasir Ali 3/25 (9 overs)	Khan Research Laboratory Ground, Rawalpindi; Umpires: Raweed Khan and Saqib Khan
Port Qasim Authority won the toss and elected to field; Port Qasim Authority 9 points, Khan Research Laboratories 0 points

14–17 November	National Bank of Pakistan	v	Water and Power Development Authority	Water and Power Development Authority won by an innings and 9 runs
Scorecard	164 (62.1 overs); Kamran Akmal 37 (63); Zulfiqar Babar 4/86 (26 overs)		286 (100.2 overs); Zulfiqar Babar 78* (58); Imran Khan 4/70 (24 overs)	Iqbal Stadium, Faisalabad; Umpires: Ahsan Raza and Akmal Hayat
Scorecard	113 (33.2 overs); Nasir Jamshed 56 (83); Azhar Attari 3/19 (8.2 overs)			Iqbal Stadium, Faisalabad; Umpires: Ahsan Raza and Akmal Hayat
Water and Power Development Authority won the toss and elected to field; Water and Power Development Authority 9 points, National Bank of Pakistan 0 points

14–17 November	Pakistan International Airlines	v	Sui Northern Gas Pipelines Limited	Sui Northern Gas Pipelines Limited won by 143 runs
Scorecard	101 (35.5 overs); Faisal Iqbal 31 (35); Samiullah Khan 3/35 (7.5 overs)		234 (90.4 overs); Ali Waqas 105* (187); Anwar Ali 5/66 (30 overs)	Gaddafi Stadium, Lahore; Umpires: Aftab Gillani and Akram Raza
Scorecard	135 (44.2 overs); Anwar Ali 31* (47); Samiullah Khan 5/36 (15 overs)		145/5 (48 overs); Ali Waqas 64 (109); Aizaz Cheema 3/27 (12 overs)	Gaddafi Stadium, Lahore; Umpires: Aftab Gillani and Akram Raza
Pakistan International Airlines won the toss and elected to field; Sui Northern Gas Pipelines Limited 9 points, Pakistan International Airlines 0; Sui Northern Gas Pipelines Limited qualify for the Final as a result of this match.

14–17 November	State Bank of Pakistan	v	Zarai Taraqiati Bank	Zarai Taraqiati Bank Limited won by 4 wickets
Scorecard	298/8 (88.1 overs); Gulraiz Sadaf 69 (127); Sohail Tanvir 7/61 (25.1 overs)		239 (78.5 overs); Imran Nazir 63 (72); Saad Altaf 6/71 (27.5 overs)	Diamond Club Ground, Islamabad; Umpires: Tahir Shah and Zameer Haider
Scorecard	140 (52.5 overs); Rameez Raja 39 (55); Mohammad Khalil 5/48 (20 overs)		200/6 (42.2 overs); Haris Sohail 68* (98); Kashif Siddiq 4/32 (7 overs)	Diamond Club Ground, Islamabad; Umpires: Tahir Shah and Zameer Haider
Zarai Taraqiati Bank Limited won the toss and elected to field; Zarai Taraqiati Bank Limited 6 points. State Bank of Pakistan 0 points

Report

WAPDA v NBP

==== Round 8 ====
20–23 November	Habib Bank Limited	v	Sui Northern Gas Pipelines Limited	Match drawn
Scorecard	293 (72 overs); Ahmed Shehzad 94 (99); Zahoor Khan 4/51(14 overs)		232 (68.5 overs); Azhar Ali 56 (127); Abdul Ameer 3/57 (15.5 overs)	Diamond Club Ground, Islamabad; Umpires: Ahsan Raza and Shozab Raza
Scorecard	73/5 (36 overs); Imran Farhat 44 (66); Imran Khalid 2/6 (4 overs)		199 (73.4 overs); Azeem Ghumman 53 (128); Ehsan Adil 4/44 (15.4 overs)	Diamond Club Ground, Islamabad; Umpires: Ahsan Raza and Shozab Raza
Sui Northern Gas Pipelines Limited won the toss and elected to bat; Habib Bank Limited 3 points, Sui Northern Gas Pipelines Limited 0 points; Habib Bank Limited qualify for the Final as a result of this match.

20–23 November	Khan Research Laboratories	v	Pakistan International Airlines	Khan Research Laboratories won by 7 wickets
Scorecard	343 (100.5 overs); Shoaib Ahmed 177 (279); Aizaz Cheema 3/83 (24 overs)		268 (83 overs); Tahir Khan 57* (98); Rahat Ali 4/69 (19 overs)	Khan Research Laboratory Ground, Rawalpindi; Umpires: Aftab Gillani and Nadeem Iqbal
Scorecard	123/3 (27.1 overs); Tayyab Riaz 54 (67); Aizaz Cheema 2/23 (9 overs)		194 (65.3 overs); Sarfraz Ahmed 53* (76); Yasir Ali 3/34 (15 overs)	Khan Research Laboratory Ground, Rawalpindi; Umpires: Aftab Gillani and Nadeem Iqbal
Pakistan International Airlines won the toss and elected to bat; First-class debut Ali Nadeem (Khan Research Laboratories); Khan Research Laboratories 9 points, Pakistan International Airlines 0 points

20–23 November	National Bank of Pakistan	v	United Bank Limited	National Bank of Pakistan won by an innings and 49 runs
Scorecard	317/9d (80.2 overs); Nasir Jamshed 123* (186); Kashif Bhatti 4/39 (15.2 overs)		101 (39.5 overs); Saad Sukhail 33 (66); Imran Khan 5/38 (15.5 overs)	Rawalpindi Cricket Stadium, Rawalpindi; Umpires: Akmal Hayat and Akram Raza
Scorecard			167 (43.3 overs); Kashif Bhatti 41 (22); Wahab Riaz 5/62 (18 overs)	Rawalpindi Cricket Stadium, Rawalpindi; Umpires: Akmal Hayat and Akram Raza
National Bank of Pakistan won the toss and elected to field; National Bank of Pakistan 9 points, United Bank Limited 0 points

20–23 November	Port Qasim Authority	v	Zarai Taraqiati Bank	Zarai Taraqiati Bank Limited won by 9 wickets
Scorecard	148 (36.4 overs); Khurram Manzoor 54 (78); Zohaib Khan 3/15 (5 overs)		365 (78 overs); Imran Nazir 74 (69); Azam Hussain 7/99 (30 overs)	Marghzar Cricket Ground, Islamabad; Umpires: Raweed Khan and Saqib Khan
Scorecard	257 (54.2 overs); Umar Amin 60 (86); Sohail Tanvir 5/94 (20.2 overs)		41/1 (6.2 overs); Sharjeel Khan 22* (26); Tanvir Ahmed 1/15 (3.2 overs)	Marghzar Cricket Ground, Islamabad; Umpires: Raweed Khan and Saqib Khan
Zarai Taraqiati Bank Limited won the toss and elected to field; Zarai Taraqiati Bank Limited 9 points, Port Qasim Authority 0 points

20–23 November	State Bank of Pakistan	v	Water and Power Development Authority	Water and Power Development Authority won by 4 runs
Scorecard	156 (66.3 overs); Adnan Raees 39 (96); Junaid Khan 4/54 (23.3 overs)		202 (76.4 overs); Sohaib Maqsood 51 (77); Adnan Rasool 3/48 (28 overs)	Iqbal Stadium, Faisalabad; Umpires: Ehtesham-ul-Haq and Tahir Shah
Scorecard	160 (50.2 overs); Adnan Raees 46 (90); Zulfiqar Babar 7/74 (23.2 overs)		118 (57.5 overs); Mohammad Ayub 32* (75); Adnan Rasool 5/60 (23 overs)	Iqbal Stadium, Faisalabad; Umpires: Ehtesham-ul-Haq and Tahir Shah
Water and Power Development Authority won the toss and elected to bat; First-class debut: Shehzor Jumani (Water and Power Development Authority); Water and Power Development Authority 9 points, State Bank of Pakistan 0 points

ZTBL v PQA, NBP v UBL Report

WAPDA v SBP, KRL v PIA, SNGPL v HBL Report

==== Round 9 ====
26–29 November	Habib Bank Limited	v	Port Qasim Authority	Match drawn
Scorecard	198/2 (34 overs); Imran Farhat 97 (92); Umar Amin 2/49 (8 overs)		675/6d (171.4 overs); Umar Amin 281 (397); Imran Farhat 2/56 (13 overs)	Diamond Club Ground, Islamabad; Umpires: Qaiser Waheed and Raweed Khan
Habib Bank Limited won the toss and elected to field; First-class debuts: Ali Dawood (Port Qasim Authority); Habib Bank Limited 0 points, Port Qasim Authority 0 points

26–29 November	Khan Research Laboratories	v	National Bank of Pakistan	Khan Research Laboratories won by 10 wickets
Scorecard	239 (78.1 overs); Saeed Anwar 96 (192); Qaiser Abbas 4/40 (14.1 overs)		124 (44.4 overs); Anwaar Hafeez 45* (95); Ali Khan 5/11 (8 overs)	Khan Research Laboratory Ground, Rawalpindi; Umpires: Ghaffar Kazmi and Zameer Haider
Scorecard	39/0 (3.5 overs); Zain Abbas 23* (15)		151 (52.5 overs); Kamran Akmal 48 (88); Tayyab Riaz 4/23 (7.5 overs)	Khan Research Laboratory Ground, Rawalpindi; Umpires: Ghaffar Kazmi and Zameer Haider
Khan Research Laboratories won the toss and elected to field; Khan Research Laboratories 9 points, National Bank of Pakistan 0 points

26–29 November	Pakistan International Airlines	v	Water and Power Development Authority	Match drawn
Scorecard	94 (37.3 overs); Faisal Iqbal 30 (28); Zulfiqar Babar 5/17 (6.3 overs)		240 (65.5 overs); Saad Nasim 101* (141); Anwar Ali 5/83 (24.5 overs)	Quaid-e-Azam Stadium, Mirpur; Umpires: Akram Raza and Ehtesham-ul-Haq
Scorecard	291/5 ( 84 overs); Shoaib Khan 128* (164); Junaid Khan 4/64 (23 overs)		209 (50.3 overs); Ali Azmat 46 (75); Kamran Sajid 3/30 (6 overs)	Quaid-e-Azam Stadium, Mirpur; Umpires: Akram Raza and Ehtesham-ul-Haq
Pakistan International Airlines, won the toss and elected to field; Water and Power Development Authority 3 points, Pakistan International Airlines 0 points

26–29 November	State Bank of Pakistan	v	Sui Northern Gas Pipelines Limited	Match drawn
Scorecard	117 (39.3 overs); Kashif Siddiq 39 (67); Bilawal Bhatti 4/32 (10 overs)		310 (98.5 overs); Mohammad Rizwan 136* (207); Rizwan Haider 4/87 (27.5 overs)	National Ground, Islamabad; Umpires: Ahsan Raza and Shozab Raza
Scorecard			149/2 (36.5 overs); Umar Akmal 57* (113); Mohammad Ali 1/42 (8 overs)	National Ground, Islamabad; Umpires: Ahsan Raza and Shozab Raza
State Bank of Pakistan won the toss and elected to field; No play on day 4 due to rain; Sui Northern Gas Pipelines Limited 3 points, State Bank of Pakistan 0 points

26–29 November	United Bank Limited	v	Zarai Taraqiati Bank	Zarai Taraqiati Bank Limited won by an innings and 256 runs
Scorecard	179 (52.4 overs); Imran Ali 61 (86); Zohaib Khan 3/29 (12.4 overs)		643/6d (114.1 overs); Imran Nazir 185 (152); Shabbir Ahmed 2/79 (28 overs)	Marghzar Cricket Ground, Islamabad; Umpires: Aftab Gillani and Tahir Shah
Scorecard	208(f/o) (59 overs); Osama Shah 58* (113); Junaid Nadir 3/44 (12 overs)			Marghzar Cricket Ground, Islamabad; Umpires: Aftab Gillani and Tahir Shah
United Bank Limited won the toss and elected to field; Zarai Taraqiati Bank Limited 9 points, United Bank Limited 0 points

Report

== Final ==
14–18 January 2013
Scorecard

Habib Bank Limited	v	Sui Northern Gas Pipelines Limited
137 (56.4 overs); Ahmed Shehzad 79 (156); Mohammad Hafeez 4/16 (13.4 overs)		283 (119 overs); Misbah-ul-Haq 85 (193); Fahad Masood 5/67 (28 overs)
253 (80.1 overs); Asad Shafiq 58 (105); Mohammad Hafeez 3/62 (22 overs)		182 (56 overs); Umar Akmal 76 (121); Umar Gul 6/67 (22 overs)

Sui Northern Gas Pipelines Limited won by 75 runs
National Stadium, Karachi
Umpires: Riazuddin and Saleem Badar
Player of the match: Misbah-ul-Haq (Sui Northern Gas Pipelines Limited)

- Habib Bank Limited won the toss and elected to field
- Umar Gul took a hat-trick with the wickets of Umar Akmal, Imran Khalid, Imran Ali

== Statistics ==
=== Most runs ===
Player	Team	Matches	Innings	Not Outs	Runs	Average	HS	100s	50s
Umar Amin	Port Qasim Authority	9	17	0	767	45.11	281	1	4
Haris Sohail	Zarai Taraqiati Bank	5	9	4	673	134.60	152	4	2
Ali Waqas	Sui Northern Gas Pipelines Limited	8	15	3	646	53.83	105	1	4
Sohaib Maqsood	Water and Power Development Authority	9	15	0	618	41.20	110	1	6
Imran Farhat	Habib Bank Limited	7	12	0	616	51.33	102	1	5

Last updated 30 November 2012

=== Highest scores ===
Runs	Balls	Player	Team	Opponent	Ground	Date of match
281	397	Umar Amin	Port Qasim Authority	Habib Bank Limited	Diamond Club Ground	26 November 2012
193	301	Mohammad Hafeez	Sui Northern Gas Pipelines Limited	United Bank Limited	Rawalpindi Cricket Stadium	8 November 2012
185	152	Imran Nazir	Zarai Taraqiati Bank	United Bank Limited	Marghzar Cricket Ground	26 November 2012
177	279	Shoaib Ahmed	Khan Research Laboratories	Pakistan International Airlines	Khan Research Laboratory Ground	20 October 2012
152	230	Shoaib Ahmed	Khan Research Laboratories	Zarai Taraqiati Bank	Jinnah Stadium	3 October 2012

Last updated 30 November 2012

=== Most wickets ===
Player	Team	Matches	Overs	Wickets	Average	BBI	5wi	10wm
Zulfiqar Babar	Water and Power Development Authority	9	358.5	62	15.03	7/74	5	0
Ehsan Adil	Habib Bank Limited	9	255.5	53	17.00	6/58	3	0
Imran Khan	Sui Northern Gas Pipelines Limited	9	263.3	50	17.22	6/40	3	0
Aizaz Cheema	Pakistan International Airlines	9	296.4	46	18.82	4/33	0	0
Samiullah Khan	Sui Northern Gas Pipelines Limited	9	241.4	45	15.86	6/31	3	1

Last updated 30 November 2012

=== Best bowling ===
Figures	Overs	Player	Team	Opponent	Ground	Match date
7/29	14.1	Wahab Riaz	National Bank of Pakistan	State Bank of Pakistan	Gaddafi Stadium	8 November 2012
7/41	9.2	Tanvir Ahmed	Port Qasim Authority	National Bank of Pakistan	Gaddafi Stadium	2 November 2012
7/42	8.0	Asad Ali	Sui Northern Gas Pipelines Limited	United Bank Limited	Rawalpindi Cricket Stadium	8 November 2012
7/61	23.3	Mohammad Sami	Port Qasim Authority	Pakistan International Airlines	National Stadium	15 October 2012
7/61	25.1	Sohail Tanvir	Zarai Taraqiati Bank	State Bank of Pakistan	Diamond Club Ground	14 November 2012

Last updated 30 November 2012
