= Tayyib =

Tayyib (Arabic: طيب, also anglicized as Taib or Tayeb, among other romanizations and spellings) is an Arabic word meaning "good" or "pleasant". It is also a masculine given name. It may be borrowed into other languages, where its spelling and pronunciation is changed, like Tayyip in Turkish. The feminine form of Tayyib is Tayyiba which, in addition to being a feminine given name, has been the name of various places and organizations. Tayyib may refer to the following people:

== Given name ==
- Tayeb Abdallah (died 2007), Sudanese president of the Sudanese football (soccer) club Al-Hilal
- Tayeb Belaiz (1948–2023), Algerian jurist and politician
- Tayeb Berramla (born 1985), Algerian football player
- Tayeb Maroci (born 1985), Algerian football player
- Tayeb Salih (1929–2009), Sudanese writer
- Tayeb Saddiki (1939–2016), Moroccan playwright, writing in both Arabic and French
- Tayeb Zitouni (1956–2025), Algerian politician
- Tayyip Talha Sanuç (born 1999), Turkish professional footballer
- Tayyab Abbas (born 1994), Pakistani cricketer
- Tayyab Agha (born 1976), Afghan politician
- Tayyab Aslam (born 1996), Pakistani squash player
- Tayyab Riaz (born 1992), Pakistani cricketer
- Al Taib Mustafa (died 2021), Sudanese journalist, writer, and politician
- Al Tayeb Abdul Rahim (1944–2020), Palestinian politician
- Tayeb Salih (1929–2009), Sudanese writer, novelist, and journalist
- Sayed Tayib al-Madani, member of Al-Qaeda
- Tayyeb Tizini (1934–2019), Syrian philosopher

== Middle name ==
- Mohamed Tayeb Benouis (1948–2007), Algerian aviator, business executive, director general of Air Algérie from 2001 to 2007
- Said Tayeb Jawad (born 1958), the former Ambassador of Afghanistan to the United States
- Suleiman Tayeb Ahmed Salem, Ambassador of the Sahrawi Republic to Nicaragua
- Recep Tayyip Erdoğan (born 1954), Turkish politician, former Prime Minister current President of Turkey

== Surname ==
- Atef El Tayeb (1947–1995), Arab Egyptian film director
- Ninet Tayeb (born 1983), Israeli pop rock singer
- Nour El Tayeb, (born 1993), professional squash player who represented Egypt
- Omar al-Tayib (died 2023), Sudanese soldier and politician
- Muhammad ibn at-Tayib ar-Rudani, Moroccan judge
- Abdullah El Tayib (1921–2003), Sudanese writer and scholar of Sudanese literature and the Arabic language
- Griselda El Tayib (1925–2022), British visual artist and cultural anthropologist
- Tarik El Taib (born 1977), Libyan football midfielder

== See also ==
- Souk el Tayeb, open-air weekly farmers market in Lebanon that specializes in organic food products
- Tayba TV, Sudanese television channel
- Tayyibi Isma'ilism, sect of Ismaili Shi'ism
- Hapoel Tayibe F.C., Israeli football team
