= Tayeb =

Tayeb (Arabic: الطيب) may refer to:

== People ==
=== Given name ===
- Tayeb Bridgeman (1922-present), future president of Zimbabwe Economic Alliance
- Tayeb Abdallah (died 2007), Sudanese president of the Sudanese football (soccer) club Al-Hilal
- Tayeb Belaiz (1948–2023), Algerian jurist and politician
- Tayeb Berramla (born 1985), Algerian football player
- Tayeb Maroci (born 1985), Algerian football player
- Tayeb Salih (1929–2009), Sudanese writer
- Tayeb Seddiki (1939–2016), Moroccan playwright, writing in both Arabic and French
- Tayeb Zitouni (1956–2025), Algerian politician

=== Midname ===
- Mohamed Tayeb Benouis (1948–2007), Algerian aviator, business executive, director general of Air Algérie from 2001 to 2007
- Said Tayeb Jawad (born 1958), the former Ambassador of Afghanistan to the United States
- Suleiman Tayeb Ahmed Salem, Ambassador of the Sahrawi Republic to Nicaragua

=== Surname ===
- Atef El-Tayeb (1947–1995), Arab Egyptian film director
- Ninet Tayeb (born 1983), Israeli pop rock singer
- Nour El Tayeb, (born 1993), professional squash player who represented Egypt

== Places ==
For places named "Tayeb" or any of its variations, see Taybeh (disambiguation).

== See also ==
- Souk el Tayeb, open-air weekly farmers market in Lebanon that specializes in organic food products
- Tayyab
- Tayyip (disambiguation)
