= Tayyab =

Tayyab is an Arabic male given name and surname meaning "good-natured". Related names include Tayyib, Tayeb or Tayyip. Notable people with the name Tayyab include:

- Tayyab Abbas (born 1994), Pakistani cricketer
- Tayyab Mahmood Sheikh (born 2003), Young Pakistani Business Entrepreneur
- Tayyab Agha (born 1976), Afghan politician
- Tayyab Aslam (born 1996), Pakistani squash player
- Tayyab Riaz (born 1992), Pakistani cricketer

== See also ==
- El Taib
- Taybeh (disambiguation)
- Lashkar-e-Taiba, Islamist militant group in Kashmir
