= Operation El-Kseur =

- Part of Insurgency in the Maghreb (2002–present)
Date	June 2004
Location	El Kseur, Algeria
Result	Algerian victory

Belligerents
Algeria	(al-Qaeda) GSPC

Commanders and leaders
Unknown	(al-Qaeda) Nabil Sahraoui † (al-Qaeda) Si Abdelaziz † (al-Qaeda) Mourad Kettab †

Strength
Unknown	Unknown

Casualties and losses
Unknown	Unknown

Operation El-Kseur was a military confrontation between the Algerian People's National Army and the GSPC in El Kseur, Algeria in June 2004. It resulted in the death of GSPC leader Nabil Sahraoui.

== Background ==
On June 2, 2004, the GSPC launched a deadly assault on Algerian soldiers, killing 12 and injuring 26. In response, the Algerian army initiated a full-scale operation against the GSPC. The operation targeted a forested area in the Kabylia region, particularly in El Kseur, Béjaia Province. The mountains of Kabylia have been recognized as a hub for terrorism since the end of the Algerian Civil War in 2002.

== Operation ==
Following a three-day gun battle in the woods of El Kseur, the GSPC suffered defeat, signaling a victory for the Algerian army. Among the casualties were Nabil Sahraoui, the Emir of the GSPC, Abi Abdelaziz, his right-hand man, and Mourad Kettab, who was responsible for intelligence and communication. The bodies were then taken to the Frantz Fanon hospital morgue in Béjaia, where Nabil Sahraoui's family was informed of his death.
