= Adami (surname) =

Adami is a surname. Notable people with the surname include:

- Adam Adami (footballer) (born 1992), Brazilian football player
- Adam Adami (diplomat) (1603 or 1610 – 1663), German diplomat and priest
- Beppe Fenech Adami, Maltese politician
- Chris Adami (born 1962), German physicist and evolutionary theorist
- Eddie Fenech Adami (born 1934), Prime Minister of Malta 1987–1996 & 1998–2004
- Giuseppe Adami (1878–1946), Italian librettist, playwright and music critic
- Greta Adami (born 1992), Italian footballer
- Guy Adami, TV personality, one of the Fast Money (CNBC) five
- Joam Mattheus Adami (1576–1633), Italian Jesuit missionary
- João Spadari Adami (1897–1972), Brazilian historian
- Luigi Adami (1900–1985), Italian sports shooter
- Mohamed Adami, Algerian politician
- Pavol Adami (1739–1814), Slovak scientist and scholar
- Pietro Adami, 18th-century Italian painter
- Riccardo Adami (born 1973), Italian engineer
- Valerio Adami (born 1935), Italian painter
