= Amari Saifi =

Algerian Islamist leader

- عماري صيفي
- Born: 23 April 1968 (age 58); Guelma, Algeria
- Military career
- Allegiance: Algeria (1987–1993) (al-Qaeda) Al-Qaeda (1993–2004)
- Branch: (Algeria) ANP (1987–1993) (al-Qaeda) GIA (1993–1998) (al-Qaeda) GSPC (1998–2004)
- Service years: 1987–2004
- Rank: Emir
- Conflicts: Algerian Civil War; Sahel Islamist Insurgency

Amari Saifi (Arabic: عماري صيفي) (born 23 April 1968), also known under his aliases Abou Haidara or Abderrazak le Para, is one of the leaders of the Islamist militia Salafist Group for Preaching and Combat (GSPC).

According to Paris Match, Saifi claims to have been the head of the bodyguard of the Algerian defense minister Khaled Nezzar from 1990 to 1993. It is believed that he joined the armed Islamist movement in 1992 and later advanced to become the second-in-command of the GSPC, but his name did not appear on the GSPC website until 2004. His nickname "El Para" is derived from "paratrooper", as he is believed to have been a trained parachutist in the Algerian armed forces before integrating in the Islamist network.

Saifi became widely known when he was identified as one of the kidnappers who abducted in 2003 a group of 32 tourists, most of them German, in Algeria. It was then that the Algerian government claimed that the former military agent had switched sides and defected.

After the hostages were released in two groups - one liberated by the Algerian army, the other against ransom - Saifi and 50 of his men allegedly left northern Mali and were pursued through Niger by combined Algerian and Malian forces into northern Chad.

In March 2004, Saifi was captured by the Movement for Democracy and Justice in Chad (MDJT), a Chadian rebel group. The MDJT leaders tried to have him sent to Germany to stand trial, but finally handed him over to the Algerian secret services in October 2004. In June 2005, the Algerian government announced that he had been sentenced to life imprisonment.

An investigation by Le Monde diplomatique assured in 2005 that Saifi was not a true Islamist but an agent of the Algerian government who staged a false flag attack by kidnapping the tourists. The British writer Jeremy Keenan elaborated on this theory since 2006, speculating that the supposed presence of (false) Islamist extremist terror elements in southern Algeria would allow the US to broaden their counterterrorist agreements with several Sahel countries.

In March 2011, the Algerian justice minister Tayeb Belaiz stated that Hassan Hattab had been put in a safe place, whereas Amari Saifi or Abderezzak El Para had been imprisoned.
