= Hassan Hattab =

Algerian Islamist leader

- Native name: حسان حطاب
- Born: 14 January 1967 (age 58); Rouiba, Algeria
- Allegiance: Algeria (?–1989) (al-Qaeda) GIA (1992–1996) (al-Qaeda) GSPC (1998–2003)
- Rank: Emir
- Battles / wars: Algerian Civil War

Hassan Hattab (Arabic: حسان حطاب; born 14 January 1967), also known as Abu Hamza (Arabic: أبو حمزة), is the founder and first leader of the Algerian Jihadist rebel group Salafist Group for Preaching and Combat (GSPC) from 1998 to 2003.

== Early life and education ==
Born in Rouiba on 14 January 1967, Hattab received religious education in his hometown. Later, he was trained as a paratrooper in his national service in the Algerian army, in the course of which he met his future lieutenants Amari Saïfi and Abbi Abdelaziz. After leaving the army in 1989, he became a mechanic. He joined the most radical of the Islamist guerrilla movements, the Armed Islamic Group (GIA), after the cancellation of the 1992 elections. In 1994, he became "amir", or chief, in charge of what it called the "second zone" (Kabylia and the eastern part of the capital). As such, he notably was the signer of the document announcing that the GIA had assassinated the Kabyle singer Lounes Matoub.

== GSPC ==
Hattab left the GIA in 1996, rejecting its takfirist policy of massacring Algerian civilians en masse and accusing it of being infiltrated by the Algerian secret services. He formed a separate group, the Salafist Group for Preaching and Combat (GSPC), the same year. However, there is another report giving the year of foundation as 1998. The main objective of the GSPC, like the GIA, was to establish an Islamic state in Algeria, rejecting the current secular government. Hattab declared that the GSPC would refrain from attacking civilians. This policy enabled the GSPC to build a larger support network than that of the GIA, making it Algeria's most significant Islamist movement. In 2000, the GSPC embraced Al-Qaeda's ideology of global Jihad.

The GSPC was mainly active in the east of the country, notably in the forests of western Kabylie such as Mizrana, Boumehni, Sidi Ali Bounab, and Takhoukht. The GSPC soon eclipsed the GIA as the latter was torn apart by internal purges and army victories. Hattab lost his leadership position and on 23 October 2003, Nabil Sahraoui took over the group. This was as a result of Hattab's view that reconciliation with the government should be encouraged. A "repentant" ex-member reported that Hattab was killed by members of his own organization in summer 2003. However, his successor, the then GSPC leader Sahraoubi reported that Hattab had resigned "of his own accord".

On 9 February 2005, the GSPC announced that it had excluded Hattab entirely from the group and saw him as a "stranger to jihad" and a "suppliant before tyranny", according to El Watan, thus further suggesting that previous rumors of his death were incorrect. In March, he was reported to have called for the GSPC to end their fight.

== Surrender ==
On 22 March 2007, Agence France Presse reported that Hassan Hattab was under a death sentence in Algeria. On 5 October 2007, then-Algerian Minister of Interior Noureddine Yazid Zerhouni confirmed that Hattab had surrendered on 22 September. However, Hattab did not attend the court. In March 2011, then-Justice Minister Tayeb Belaiz stated that Hassan Hattab had been put in a safe place, whereas Abderezzak El Para had been imprisoned.
