= Belkacem Zeghmati =

Algerian politician

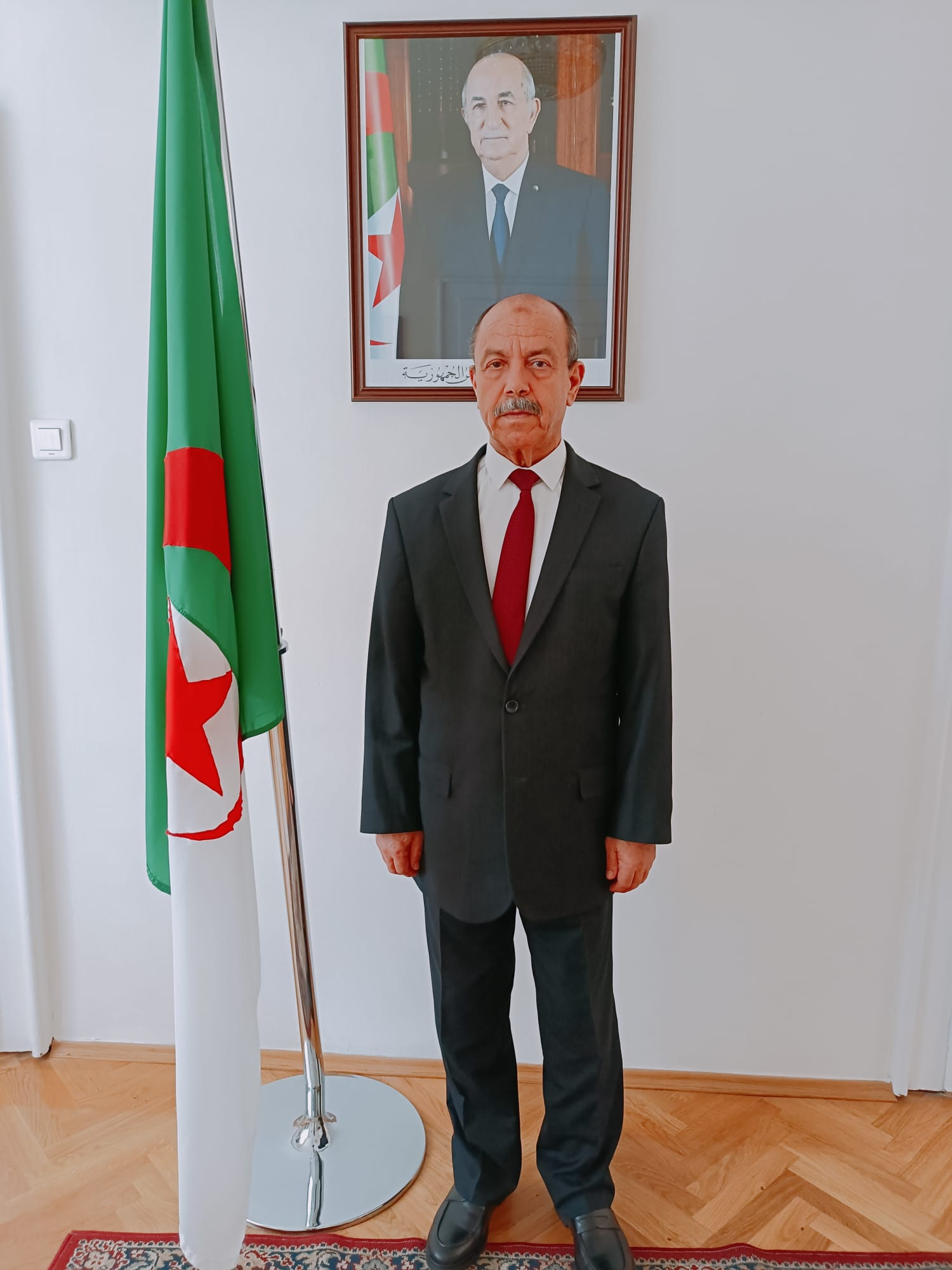

Minister of Justice and Keeper of the Seals
- In office 31 July 2019 – 7 July 2021
- President: Abdelaziz Bouteflika; Abdelkader Bensalah (acting); Abdelmadjid Tebboune
- Prime Minister: Ahmed Ouyahia; Noureddine Bedoui; Sabri Boukadoum; Abdelaziz Djerad; Aymen Benabderrahmane
- Succeeded by: Abderrachid Tabbi

Personal details
- Born: 2 January 1957 (age 69)
- Occupation: Politician

Belkacem Zeghmati (born 2 January 1957) is an Algerian politician who served as Minister of Justice and Keeper of the Seals from 2019 to 2021.
