= Tayyip =

Tayyip (pronounced [tajˈjip]) is a Turkish given name for males. Tayyip may refer to:

- Recep Tayyip Erdoğan (born 1954), Turkish politician, and Prime Minister of the Republic of Turkey from 2003 to 2014, and current President of Turkey since 2014
- Tayyip Talha Sanuç (born 1999), Turkish professional footballer

== Names with the same derivation from Arabic ==
- Tayyab
- El Taib/Al Taib
- Tayeb

== See also ==
- Taybeh (disambiguation)
