= 2003 Sahara hostage crisis =

Terrorist incident in Algeria

- Part of the Insurgency in the Maghreb (2002–present)
| Date | 19 February – 17 August 2003 |
| Location | Algerian Desert |
| Result | Algerian government victory: Raid on 17 May freed 17 hostages; The rest were freed on 18 August |

Belligerents
| Algeria | (al-Qaeda) Salafist Group for Preaching and Combat |

Strength
| 1,200 troops | Unknown |

Casualties and losses
| None | 9 killed |
- 1 hostage died from heatstroke

The 2003 Sahara hostage crisis concerns the events surrounding the abduction of 32 European tourists in seven separate groups in the Algerian Desert in 2003. They were released in two groups: one in Algeria and the other from neighbouring Mali, several months later.

== Kidnappings ==
Between February 19 and early April 2003, seven independently mobile parties of European tourists in 4WDs and on motorcycles, including 16 Germans, 10 Austrians, 4 Swiss, a Dutchman and a Swede, went missing in the UNESCO-listed Tassili N'Ajjer region of southeast Algeria, most while travelling along the popular 470-km 'Graveyard Piste' between Bordj Omar Driss and Illizi. On 13 April, Algerian military sources announced that the tourists had been kidnapped but were still alive, but the identity of kidnappers and their demands were not known. The 32 tourists had been divided into two groups.

A 1,200-strong force of Algerian army and police continued to comb the area using camels, road blocks and helicopters, assisted by a team of specialist officers from anti-terrorist Special Intervention Group. One of the Swiss tourists had called relatives on their satellite phone just after his disappearance, but was cut off in mid-sentence. Many commentators remained perplexed as to how preparations for such a large scale abduction could pass unnoticed in an area where mobility is limited to one highway and a few pistes and valleys frequented by nomads and other locals.

== Ransom demands ==
There had been no official word of any ransom demand from their kidnappers, believed to be members of the Salafist Group for Preaching and Combat (known by the French acronym GSPC - Groupe Salafiste pour la Predication et le Combat), a militant Islamic group with links to Al-Qaeda. On 4 May the Algerian government admitted that it had been in talks for some weeks. Although the statement by tourism minister Lakhdar Dorbani did not say to whom officials were talking, it indirectly confirmed for the first time that the tourists had been kidnapped, rather than reiterating the government’s former line that they may have been lost. The German Foreign Minister Joschka Fischer is reported to have held talks with the Algerian president on efforts to find the tourists.

== Release of the first group ==
A group of 17 hostages was freed in a raid on 17 May. The Algerian Army claimed its men freed the group after a ‘brief gunfight’, but the Algerian newspaper al-Watan reported that they had been freed after a battle that left nine of the captors dead in a clash that lasted several hours. The Army were said to have found the captives in two groups in canyons west of Illizi and in the Gharis region, southwest of Amguid army base and 300 km southeast of the town of In Salah. The Algerian Army said that the terrorists killed in the raid were members of the GSPC. They went on to acknowledge the second group of 15 hostages held in the Tamelrik plateau (Oued Samene), 60 km southwest of Ilizzi in southeastern Algeria, were now at much greater risk. The German and Swiss governments expressed dismay at the use of force.

== Release of the second group ==
The remaining 15 hostages left the Tamelrik plateau were on the move from mid-May, soon after the first group had been freed. They first headed north into the Erg Issassouane, then west to a plateau northwest of Amguid, spending a few weeks at each site. Algeria made contact with the kidnappers after using helicopters to drop leaflets over the area stating, ‘The authorities are ready to allow all the kidnappers to leave freely on the condition that the 15 hostages are liberated safe and well as soon as possible.’ A few days later the security forces were surprised to receive a reply saying that they were ‘ready to negotiate’ as long as their safety was guaranteed. In fact the GSPC were given safe passage with their captives by the Algerians leaving the south of the country, crossing into Mali near Timiaouine in late June or early July. In Mali it was thought negotiations for the hostages' release would be expedited. It was during this series of transits while at one of the hideouts southeast of In Salah that German hostage Michaela Spitzer suddenly died from heatstroke. The year 2003 was an exceptionally hot summer, both in Europe and the Sahara, and the low lying In Salah region is the hottest in Algeria.

After being moved between the Ifoghas region of northeast Mali and Taoudenni far to the northwest, with the help of go-betweens or negotiators from the Ifoghas Tuareg led by former rebel leader, Iyad Ag Ghali, after five months in captivity the remaining group were released on 17 August.

== Ransom payment ==
The German government refused to be drawn on allegations of a ransom payment but press reports stated that a ransom of around €5 million had been paid to the kidnappers by the Malian government on Germany’s behalf, to be repaid in the form of future development aid. It is now known that GSPC was in fact responsible for the kidnapping. After a few months in northern Mali, the leader of the kidnappers, former soldier Amari Saifi ('El Para') fled east across Niger but fought and was captured by MDJT rebels in the Tibesti of northern Chad. He was eventually handed over to the Algerians but to date has not been tried, raising accusations of at least partial complicity of the Algerian state or DRS secret service in the abductions. The GSPC is one of two Islamic terrorist groups that have been fighting to topple Algeria's military-backed government in a brutal insurgency over many years that has cost 100,000 lives. In 2007 the GSPC subsequently rebranded themselves as Al-Qaeda in the Islamic Maghreb (AQIM) and were responsible for the two car bombs in Algiers on 12 December 2007 aimed at the Supreme Court and the offices of the UN High Commission for Refugees.

This was the first such kidnapping of foreigners for ransom in the Sahara, but over the next decade scores more tourists, as well as others travelling or working in the Sahara have been abducted and held in northern Mali by AQIM and other jihadist groups. Most are released following ransom payments or prisoner exchanges.
