= List of members of the National Revolutionary Council, 1966 =

This is a list of members elected to the National Revolutionary Council elected by the Regional Command of the Ba'ath Party and appointed by President Amin al-Hafiz in 1966.

== Members ==
No.	Name	Party
1	Muhammad Amin al-Hafiz	Ba'ath Party
2	Michel Aflaq	Ba'ath Party
3	Mansur al-Atrash	Ba'ath Party
4	Shibli al-Isami	Ba'ath Party
5	Ibrahim Makhous	Ba'ath Party
6	Hafez al-Assad	Ba'ath Party
7	Salah al-Din al-Bitar	Ba'ath Party
8	Zayd Haydar	
9	Ilyas Farah	Ba'ath Party
10	Muhammad Abd al-Qadir al-Nayyal	
11	Suleiman al-Ali	
12	Khaled al-Jundi	
13	Jamil Thabit	
14	Nur al-Din al-Dardari	
15	Muhammad Asad al-Hamad	
16	Muhammad al-Soussi	
17	Ibrahim Nuweidar	
18	Hassan Sasila	
19	Muhammad Khalil Jawish	
20	Abd al-Rahman Abji	
21	Anwar Ajaj Iqrabi	
22	Ali Shihab al-Darwish	
23	Muhammad Arif Mard	
24	Abdallah Hakim	
25	Ali Taljabini	
26	Muhammad Murad Agha	
27	Rushdi al-Sheikha	
28	Nadhir al-Nabulsi	
29	Ahmad Hamdouni	
30	Ibrahim Shahada	
31	Youssef Abdallah Haddad	
32	Nayef Hajjar	
33	Dia al-Hajj Ali	
34	Mahmoud Abd al-Qadir	
35	Yahya Nassif	
36	Ali al-Ghadban	
37	Aziz Shurayqa	
38	Atiya Hannoush	
39	Faisal al-Najras	
40	Suleiman Khouri	
41	Ahmad Shallout	
42	Wasima Safarjalani	
43	Souad al-Abdallah	
44	Aisha al-Dabbagh	Ba'ath Party
45	Hayat Doualibi	
46	Furat Tleimat	
47	Shukriya Abd al-Ghani	
48	Nabila al-Razzaz	
49	Adila Bayhum	
50	Umayya al-Khair	
51	Loris Azar	
52	Jacqueline Bitar	
53	Franan Bali	
54	Sabah al-Rikabi	
55	Muhammad Wais	
56	Kamal Shahada	
57	Sharif al-Nabulsi	
58	Salah Omar Pasha	
59	Michel Mansour	
60	Mahmoud Saada	
61	Muhammad Said Mughrabal	
62	Ahmad al-Khatib	Ba'ath Party
63	Faiz Nasser	
64	Kamal Shawqi	
65	Abd al-Rahim Allaf	
66	Shawqi Sibai	
67	Khaled Ali	
68	Abd al-Ilah al-Assi	
69	Hassan Muryoud	Ba'ath Party
70	Abd al-Fattah al-Boushi	Ba'ath Party
71	Khairi Shalati	
72	Abdallah al-Banshi	
73	Muzhir al-Anbari	
74	Abd al-Rahman al-Kawakibi	
75	Samih Fakhouri	
76	Najah Saati	
77	Samih Atiya	
78	George Shahristan	
79	Mustafa al-Shammaa	
80	Mahmoud Arab Said	
81	Ghassan Rashad Haddad	Ba'ath Party
82	Muhammad Imran	Ba'ath Party
83	Fahmi al-Ashouri	
84	Kamal al-Hisni	
85	Salah Wazzan	
86	Hisham al-Ass	
87	Mahmoud Tujjar	
88	Mouaffaq al-Sharabji	
89	Youssef Khabbaz	Ba'ath Party
90	Haneen Siyaj	
91	Shakir Mustafa	
92	Muhammad al-Fadil	
93	Ahmad Badr al-Din	
94	Jamil Haddad	
95	Abd al-Wahhab Khayyata	
96	Bashir Qutb	
97	Nazzal al-Dairi	
98	Asaad al-Darqawi	
99	Adnan Shoman	
100	Rais al-Farhan al-Fayyad	
101	Abdallah Wathiq Shahid	
102	Karam Touma	
103	Adel al-Saadi	
104	Issa Asfour	
105	Marcel Dagher	
106	Mahmoud al-Jiyoush	Ba'ath Party
107	Issam al-Naib	
108	Darwish Dhuwaib	
109	Faiz Ismail	
110	Mustafa al-Hallaj	
111	Nur al-Din al-Rifai	
112	Sami Soufan	
113	Jamil Abd al-Qadir Alwani	
114	Abu al-Nour Tiyara	
115	Al-Walid Talib	
116	Siyah Mahoush	
117	Talib Dhamad	
118	Ahmad Houri	
119	Ahmad Hankoul	
120	Muhammad al-Sayoufi	
121	Najati al-Imam	
122	Hassan al-Faouri	
123	Youssef Nasser	
124	Hussein Hijli	
125	Ahmad Rustum	
126	Abd al-Khaliq al-Naqshbandi	
127	Madi al-Sheikh Hussein	
128	Abd al-Wahhab al-Khair	
129	Walid Ballana	
130	Suleiman al-Azan	
131	Fahmi al-Qai	
132	Muhammad Eid al-Awad	
133	Maarouf Qarqajiya	
134	Hassan al-Ahmad	
