= Katherine Smyth =

New Zealand studio potter

Katherine Smyth is a New Zealand studio potter. She has received many awards and grants for her work, and her pieces are held in national and international collections.

== Early life ==
Smyth was born in Christchurch. She initially trained as a chef at Otago Polytechnic, graduating in 1986.

== Career ==
She worked at Wellington restaurant Il Casino, then The Sugar Club alongside chef Peter Gordon. Between 1989 and 1991, she studied towards a Diploma of Fine Arts in Ceramics at Sydney’s National Art School in Australia. Between 1995 and 1999, she worked at The Sugar Club in London, and also produced some ceramic tableware for the restaurant.

In 1993, she worked in Taibeh, near Petra in Jordan, alongside English potter Jim Mason, teaching local women potting skills. “The experience of the ceramics, people and food there left an indelible mark on Smyth”, wrote Claire Regnault, “She began making tall vases and jugs inspired by Bronze Age serving and storage vessels.” In the 1990s, she made repeated trips to the Middle East.

== Recognition ==
In 2003, a Creative New Zealand Professional Development grant, and a New Work Grant the following year allowed Smyth to travel to London and the Middle East to research Bronze Age ceramics and traditional foods and create a body of work as a response. In 2012 she was awarded another Creative New Zealand grant to begin producing a series of work called Zoomorphic, based on animal forms.

In 2000, Smyth won a Merit Award at the New Zealand Society of Potters Royal Easter Show, winning the Premier Award at the Waiclay Awards. In 2007, she won a Merit Award in the Portage Ceramic Awards.

Douglas Lloyd Jenkins argues that Smyth’s work has become a highly significant part of the history of New Zealand studio pottery, “...she produces works that are delicate, but not fragile, utilitarian, but not dull...thus her ‘works have become part of the everyday life of many younger New Zealanders with a claim to some culinary skill or design consciousness.”

== Collections ==
Smyth’s works are held in the collections of Museum of New Zealand Te Papa Tongarewa, The Dowse Art Museum, the Auckland War Memorial Museum, the Wallace Arts Trust, the Museum of London and the British Institute for Archeology and History in Jordan.
