= Mohammad Imran =

Mohammad or Muhammad Imran can refer to:

- Mohammad Imran (cricketer, born 1989), Pakistani cricketer
- Mohammad Imran (cricketer, born 1990), Pakistani cricketer
- Mohammad Imran Randhawa (born 1996), Pakistani cricketer
- Mohammad Imran (cricketer, born 2001), Pakistani cricketer
- Muhammad Imran (footballer) (born 1986), Pakistani footballer
- Muhammad Imran (field hockey)
- Muhammad Imran (diplomat)
- Mohamed Imran, Maldivian footballer

== See also ==
- Imran Mohamed, Maldivian footballer
