= Tayyiba =

Tayyiba (from Arabic: طيبة, romanized: Ṭayyiba; Hebrew: טייבה; Persian: طیبه; Turkish: Tayyibe; Urdu: طیبہ) (Note: Also transliterated, with or without the definite article 'al-', 'at-', 'el-' or 'et-': 'Tayyibah', 'Tayibah', 'Tayiba', 'Tayyibeh', 'Tayyibe', 'Tayibeh', 'Tayibe', 'Taybah', 'Tayba', 'Taybe', 'Taiybeh', 'Taibah', 'Taiba', 'Taibeh', 'Taibe', 'Tibah', 'Tiba', 'Tibeh' or 'Tibe') is a feminine given name of Arabic origin. Notable people with the name include:

== Given name ==
=== Taiba ===
- Taiba Akhuetie (born 1991/92), British-Nigerian artist
- Taiba al-Mawali, Omani politician

=== Taibah ===
- Taibah Al-Ibrahim (1945–2011), Kuwaiti writer

=== Taybe ===
- Taybe Yusein (born 1991), Bulgarian wrestler

=== Tayebeh ===
- Tayebeh Safaei (born 1960), Iranian politician
- Tayyebeh Siavoshi (born 1966), Iranian politician

=== Tayyaba ===
- Tayyaba Hasan, Pakistani-American academic
- Tayyaba Zafar (born 1983), Pakistani astronomer and science communicator

=== Tayyiba ===
- Tayyiba Haneef-Park (born 1979), American volleyball player

=== Tayyibe ===
- Tayyibe Gülek (born 1968), Turkish politician and economist

=== Tiba ===
- Tiba (footballer) (born 1968), Brazilian football coach and player
- Tiba Al-Quraishi (born 1996), Iraqi football and futsal player
- Tiba Tomaj, Hungarian noble and assassin

== Places ==
=== Israel ===
- Taibe, Galilee, a village in the Jezreel Valley, Israel
- Tayibe, a city in central Israel

=== Jordan ===
- Taybeh, Petra, a village in the protected region of Petra, south of Wadi Musa on the road to Aqaba
- At-Taibah District, Irbid, district of the Irbid Governorate in northern Jordan
  - Taibah, Irbid, a town located in the above district, sharing its name with the district itself

=== Lebanon ===
- Taybeh, Marjayoun, a village in southern Lebanon
- Taybeh, Baalbek, a village in northeastern Lebanon

=== Palestine ===
- Al-Tayba, Jenin, a Palestinian village in the northern West Bank
- Taybeh, Ramallah, a mainly Christian Palestinian town situated in the Ramallah area, central West Bank
  - Taybeh Brewery, in Taybeh, central West Bank

=== Syria ===
- Al-Taybah, Daraa Governorate, a village in southwestern Syria, possibly biblical Tob
- Al-Taybah, Homs Governorate, a village in the Syrian Desert
- Al-Taybah, Rif Dimashq Governorate, a village near Damascus, southern Syria
- Al-Taybah, Deir ez-Zor Governorate, a village in Mayadin District, eastern Syria
- Al-Taybah al-Gharbiyah, a village near Homs, central Syria
- Taybat al-Imam, a town north of Hama, central Syria
- Taybat al-Ism, a village northeast of Hama, central Syria.
- Taybah al-Turki, a village east of Hama, central Syria

=== United Arab Emirates ===
- Tayyibah, United Arab Emirates, a village in the emirate of Fujairah

== See also ==
- Tayyib (disambiguation)
- Tayyip (disambiguation)
- Taibah University, university in Medina, Saudi Arabia
- Lashkar-e-Tayyiba, Islamist militant group in Kashmir
- Tayba TV, a Sudanese television channel
