= Hasan Mahmud =

Hasan Mahmud may refer to:

- Hasan Mahmud (cricketer) (born 1999), Bangladeshi cricketer
- Hasan Mahmud (politician) (born 1963), Bangladeshi politician
- Hasan Mahmood (born 1991), Pakistani cricketer
- Hassan Abdel-Fattah (Hassan Abdel-Fattah Mahmoud Al-Mahsiri, born 1982), Jordanian footballer
