= Ministry of Justice (Algeria) =

Government ministry of Algeria

Coordinates: 36°46′8″N 3°2′13″E

- وزارة العدل
- Ministry logo

Ministry overview
- Formed: July 5, 1962; 64 years ago
- Jurisdiction: Government of Algeria
- Headquarters: 8, Bir Hakem St, El-Biar, Algiers
- Minister responsible: Lotfi Boudjemaa
- Website: www.mjustice.dz

The Ministry of Justice (Arabic: وزارة العدل, romanized: Wizārat al-ʻAdl, French: Ministère de la Justice) is an Algerian government ministry. Its headquarters is in El-Biar, Algiers.

== List of ministers ==
- Amar Bentoumi (1962–1963)
- Mohamed El Hadi Hadj Smain (1963–1964)
- Mohamed Bedjaoui (1964–1970)
- Boualem Benhamouda (1972–1976)
- Abdelmalek Benhabyles (1977–1978)
- Lahcène Soufi (1979–1980)
- Boualem Baki (1980–1986)
- Mohamed Cherif Kherroubi (1986–1988)
- Ali Benflis (1989–1991)
- Hamdani Benkhelil (1992)
- Abdelhamid Mahi Bahi (1992)
- Mohamed Tegula (1993–1996)
- Mohamed Adami (1996–1998)
- El Ghouti Mekamcha (1999)
- Ahmed Ouyahia (2000–2002)
- Mohamed Charfi (2002–2003)
- Tayeb Belaiz (2003–2012)
- Ahmed Noui (2012)
- Mohamed Charfi (2012–2013)
- Tayeb Louh (2013–2019)
- Belkacem Zeghmati (2019–2021)
- Abdul Rashid Tabbi(2021–2024)
- Lotfi Boudjemaa (2024–present)

== See also ==
- Justice ministry
- Politics of Algeria
