= Nabil Sahraoui =

Algerian Islamist militant (1969–2004)

- Born: 26 September 1966/1969; Batna, Algeria
- Died: 20 June 2004 (aged 34-37); El-Kseur, Algeria
- Military career
- Allegiance: GSPC; Al-Qaeda
- Service years: ?–2004
- Rank: Emir of GSPC
- Conflicts: Insurgency in the Maghreb

Nabil Sahraoui (26 September 1969 – 20 June 2004), alias Mustapha Abou Ibrahim, was an Algerian Islamist militant, and the head of the radical Groupe Salafiste pour la Prédication et le Combat (GSPC, later renamed Al-Qaeda Organization in the Islamic Maghreb) from August 2003 until his death the following year.

== Early life ==
Sahraoui was born in Batna, Algeria, on 26 September 1966.

== GSPC ==
In 2003, Sahraoui replaced Hassan Hattab as the leader of the GSPC, since the latter was removed from the post due to his view that reconciliation with the government should be encouraged. In October 2003, Sahraoui pledged allegiance as GSPC leader to both Osama bin Laden's Al Qaeda organization and to the Taliban leader Mohammed Omar.

== Death ==
Sahraoui was killed in a shootout with the Algerian army in the Kabylie region on 20 June 2004 at age 34. His top aides were also killed in the military sweep.

Sahraoui was replaced as head of the GSPC by Abu Musab Abdel Wadoud over the objections of former leader Hassan Hattab.
