= Port Qasim Authority cricket team =

Cricket team

Port Qasim Authority cricket team was a first-class cricket team which plays in the domestic circuit of Pakistan. The team is sponsored by the Port Qasim Authority in Karachi. The team qualified for first-class cricket in May 2012, following success in the PCB Patron's Trophy (Grade II) tournament. Among the team's notable players is Mohammad Sami. The team is coached by former Pakistani cricketer, Rashid Latif.

In 2012–13, Port Qasim Authority finished ninth out of 10 teams in the President's Trophy. In 2013-14 they finished sixth out of 11 teams. The captain in both seasons was Khalid Latif.

The highest score so far is by Umar Amin, who scored 281 against Habib Bank Limited in 2012–13. The best bowling figures are 7 for 29 by G.A.Mustafa against National Bank of Pakistan in 2015–16. He took 12 for 83 in the match, which National Bank of Pakistan nevertheless won by two wickets.

== Notable players ==
- Shahzaib Ahmed
- Tanvir Ahmed
- Atif Ali
- Faraz Ali
- Umar Amin
- Shahzaib Hasan
- Azam Hussain
- Shadab Kabir
- Aariz Kamal
- Asim Kamal
- Khalid Latif
- Khurram Manzoor
- Abdur Rauf
- Mohammad Salman
- Mohammad Sami
- Zohaib Shera
- Mohammad Talha
- Usman Tariq
- Noor Wali
- Taj Wali
