= Abderrachid Tabbi =

Algerian politician

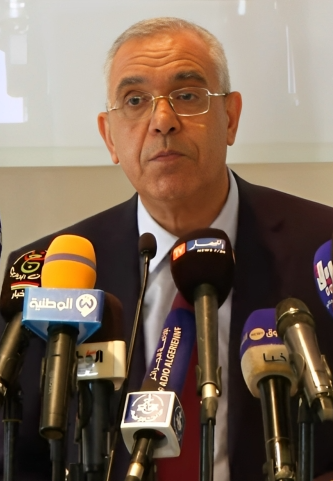

Minister of Justice and Keeper of the Seals
- In office 7 July 2021 – 18 November 2024
- President: Abdelmadjid Tebboune
- Prime Minister: Aymen Benabderrahmane; Nadir Larbaoui
- Preceded by: Belkacem Zeghmati
- Succeeded by: Lotfi Boudjemaa

Personal details
- Born: 31 December 1960 (age 65)
- Education: École nationale d'administration (D)

Abderrachid Tabbi (born 31 December 1960) was the Algerian Minister of Justice and Keeper of the Seals from 7 July 2021 to 18 November 2024.

== Education ==
Tabbi holds a Diploma (1983) from the École nationale d'administration.

== Career ==
Tabbi served as the chief of staff at the Ministry of Veterans (Moudjahidines) and the Ministry of Justice. Additionally, he was the public prosecutor at El Harrach court and worked as the General Secretary at the Bouira Court of Justice. In 2019, Tabbi was appointed first president of the Supreme Court.

Since 8 September 2021, Tabbi has been Minister of Justice and Keeper of the Seals.
