= Laid Rebiga =

Algerian politician

- العيد ربيقة
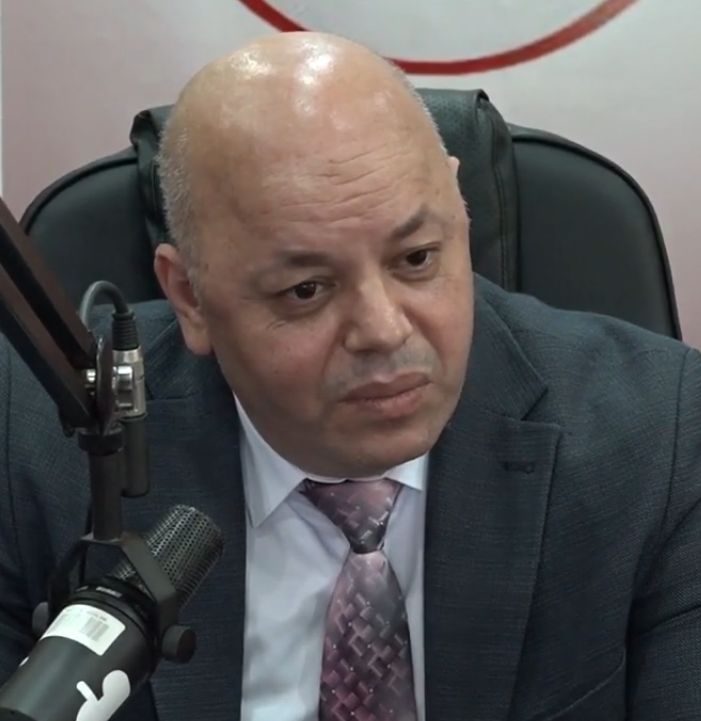

Minister of War Veterans and Rights Holders
- In office 30 June 2021 – 15 September 2025
- President: Abdelmadjid Tebboune
- Prime Minister: Aymen Benabderrahmane; Nadir Larbaoui; Sifi Ghrieb
- Preceded by: Tayeb Zitouni
- Succeeded by: Abdelmalek Tachrift

Personal details
- Born: December 28, 1973 (age 52)
- Education: National School of Administration (GDip)

Laid Rebiga (Arabic: العيد ربيقة; born 28 December 1973) is an Algerian politician that served as Minister of War Veterans and Rights Holders between 30 June 2021 and 15 September 2025.

== Education ==
Rebiga holds a Diploma in Administration from the National School of Administration (ENA).
