= Order of Manuel Amador Guerrero =

Highest honor of Panama

Order of Manuel Amador Guerrero Orden de Manuel Amador Guerrero
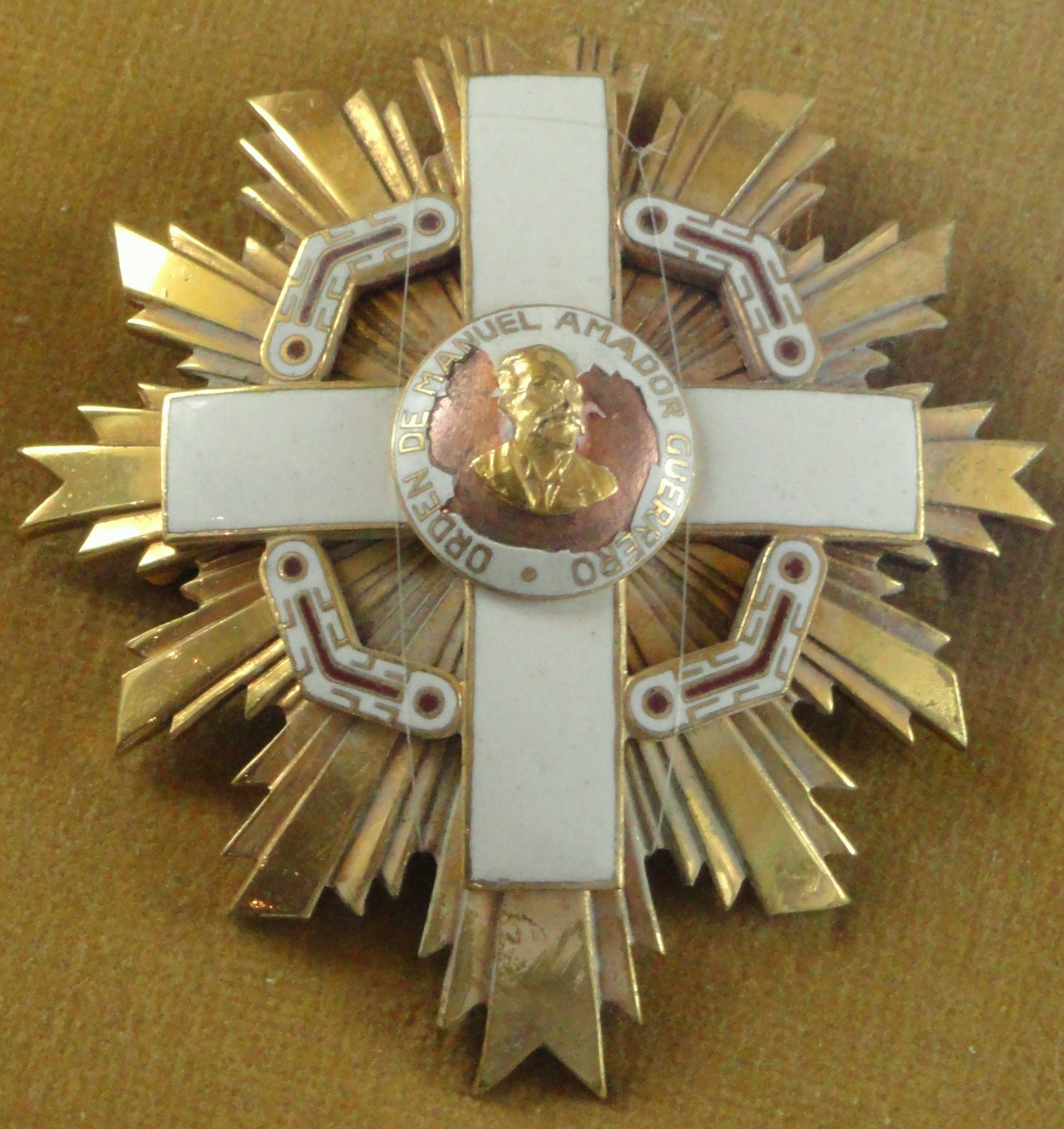
- Cross of the Order of Manuel Amador Guerrero
- Type: Order
- Country: Panama
- Gran Maestre: President of Panama
- Gran Canciller: Minister of Foreign Affairs

Precedence
- Next (lower): Order of Vasco Núñez de Balboa
- Ribbon of the order

The Order of Manuel Amador Guerrero (Spanish: Orden de Manuel Amador Guerrero) is the highest honour of Panama. Named after Manuel Amador Guerrero, the first president of Panama, the order was established on the 50th anniversary of Panama's independence on 29 October 1953. It is awarded to recognize distinguished people (Panamanians and non-Panamanians) in the sciences, arts, and politics.

== Grades ==
There are four grades of the order:

- Collar (Collar)
- Grand-Cross (Gran-Cruz)
- Grand-Officer (Gran-Oficial)
- Commander (Comendador)

Ribbons
Commander	Grand Officer	Grand Cross	Collar

== Awardees ==
=== Collar ===
- Elizabeth II, Queen of 7 States at the time of appointment, 29 November 1953
- Josip Broz Tito, Yugoslav Marshal and President of the Socialist Federal Republic of Yugoslavia, 15 March 1976
- Don Juan Carlos I, King of Spain, 16 September 1977
- Fidel Ramos, President of the Philippines, 18 September 1995
- Servant of God Fra' Andrew Bertie, 78th Prince and Grand Master of the Sovereign Military Hospitaller Order of Saint John of Jerusalem, of Rhodes and of Malta, 2000
- Fernando Henrique Cardoso, President of the Federative Republic of Brazil, 8 August 2001
- Akihito, Emperor of Japan
- Rainier III, Sovereign Prince of Monaco
- Julio María Sanguinetti Coirolo, former President of the Oriental Republic of Uruguay
- Juscelino Kubitschek de Oliveira, President of the Federative Republic of Brazil
- Nicos Anastasiades, President of Cyprus, 23 July 2013
- Ollanta Humala, President of Peru, 28 April 2014
- Rodrigo Chaves Robles, President of Costa Rica, 23 August 2024

=== Grand-Cross ===
- Prince Philip, Duke of Edinburgh, Prince Consort of 7 States at the time of appointment, 29 November 1953
- Carlos González Parrodi, 1981
- Carmen Romano, 1981
- Alfonso de Rosenzweig Díaz, 1981
- Luis G. Zorrilla, 1981
- Fredrick Chien, Minister of Foreign Affairs of the Republic of China, 1994
- Eduardo Valdés Escoffery, 1994
- Howard Baker Jr., 2001
- Dionisio de Gracia Guillén, 2001
- Suleiman Tayeb Ahmed Salem, 24 January 2008
- Juan Daniel Alemán, General Secretary of the Central American Integration System, 11 October 2010
- Juan Pablo de Laiglesia, 18 November 2011
- Patriarch Theophilos III of Jerusalem, 1 June 2012
- Yuan-Tseh Lee, 17 October 2012
- Lawrence Edward Chewning Fábrega, Ambassador to the Organization of American States and Vatican City 18 August 2014
- Dionisio Johnson, 30 December 2015
- Jimmy Carter, 39th President of the United States, 14 January 2016
- Elton D. Todd, who served as a manager for Pan American World Airways (Pan Am) in Panama,

=== Grand-Officer ===
- Anthony Bailey, interfaith campaigner, 2004
- Martin D. Young
- Sir Sean Connery, 11 March 2003
- Paxson Offield, 2005
- Robert Berry, 2005
- Elsie Alvarado de Ricord, 2005
- Eric Douglas Green, 17 October 2012
- Dwight D. Eisenhower, President of the United States of America

=== Commander ===
- Jorge Illueca, sometime President of the Republic of Panama
- José López Portillo, President of the Mexican United States, 1981
- Carlos Menem, President of the Argentine Republic, 1994
- Sebastián Piñera, later President of the Republic of Chile, 2013

=== Unknown grade ===
- Eugene N. S. Girard II
- Anil K. Dhingra, 1997
- Paul R. Noland, 1997
- Jorge Alessandri Rodríguez, President of Chile
- Enrique Berruga, 1 June 2001
- Fire Department of New York, 27 November 2001
- Harriet Mayor Fulbright
- Jimmy Carter, President of the United States of America
- Karl Johnson, 2001
- Ramiro Ordóñez Jonama, 2001
- Ricardo M. Alba, 2002
- Harold Bernstein, 2002
- Raul Orillac Arango, 2003
- Matt Kim, 2012
- David Rockefeller
- Harold Christian Hofmann 2007
- Luis Anderson McNeil
