= Mohamed Adami =

Algerian politician

Mohamed Adami was the minister for justice for Algeria in the 1995 government of Mokdad Sifi.

== See also ==
- Politics of Algeria
