= Uzair-ul-Haq =

Pakistani cricketer (born 1986)

Personal information
- Born: 15 April 1986 (age 40)
- Source: Cricinfo, 14 November 2015

Uzair-ul-Haq (born 15 April 1986) is a Pakistani first-class cricketer who played for Karachi cricket team.
