= Azam Hussain =

Pakistani cricketer (born 1985)

Personal information
- Full name: Azam Hussain
- Born: 7 September 1985 (age 41); Karachi, Sindh, Pakistan
- Batting: Left-handed
- Bowling: Slow left-arm orthodox
- Role: Bowler

Domestic team information
- Years: Team
- 2000/01–2012/13: Karachi Blues
- 2003/04–2004/05: Defence Housing Authority
- 2003/04: Karachi
- 2005/06: Pakistan Customs
- 2005/06–2014/15: Karachi Zebras
- 2006/07–2013/14: Karachi Dolphins
- 2006/07–2008/09: Sind
- 2008/09–2017/18: Karachi Whites
- 2012/13–2015/16: Port Qasim Authority
- Last FC: 27 October 2017 Karachi Whites v Federally Administered Tribal Areas
- Last LA: 27 January 2017 Karachi Whites v Peshawar

Career statistics
Competition	First-class	List A	Twenty20
Matches	107	73	60
Runs scored	1937	310	57
Batting average	16.14	9.11	6.33
100s/50s	0/4	0/0	0/0
Top score	77*	30	14*
Balls bowled	17198	3690	1293
Wickets	325	87	65
Bowling average	27.14	34.17	25.20
5 wickets in innings	14	0	0
10 wickets in match	4	0	0
Best bowling	8/113	4/35	4/17
Catches/stumpings	34/–	12/–	12/–
- Source: ESPNCricinfo, 5 July 2026

Azam Hussain (born 7 September 1985) is a Pakistani former cricketer. Hussain was a left-handed batsman who bowled slow left-arm orthodox. He was born in Karachi, Sindh.

Hussain represented Pakistan Under-19s in two Youth ODIs against Sri Lanka Under-19s in November 2001.

Hussain made his List A debut for Karachi Blues in the 2000/01 Pakistani season. The following season, he made his first-class debut for Karachi Blues. He made his Twenty20 debut for Karachi Zebras against Rawalpindi Rams in the ABN-AMRO Twenty-20 Cup on 24 February 2006.

During his domestic career, Hussain represented Karachi Blues, Defence Housing Authority, Karachi, Pakistan Customs, Karachi Zebras, Karachi Dolphins, Sind, Karachi Whites and Port Qasim Authority. He also represented Pakistan A and a number of Karachi regional sides.

Hussain established himself as a successful left-arm spinner in domestic cricket. In April 2004, playing for Karachi, he took career-best innings figures of 8 wickets for 113 runs against Rawalpindi and finished with match figures of 13 for 236 in the Quaid-e-Azam Trophy. In October 2007, playing for Karachi Blues, he took 6 wickets for 70 runs in the first innings and 4 for 40 in the second against Rawalpindi, finishing with a 10-wicket match haul.

In May 2008, Hussain played for Port Qasim Authority in the final of the Patron's Trophy, taking 6 wickets for 78 runs against State Bank of Pakistan as Port Qasim won the Grade-II title and secured promotion. In October 2012, again playing for Port Qasim Authority, he took 10 wickets for 91 runs in the match against Sui Northern Gas Pipelines Limited in the President's Trophy Grade-I. The following year, he returned his best Twenty20 figures of 4 wickets for 17 runs in a Ramazan T20 Cup match against Zarai Taraqiati Bank Limited.

Later in his career, Hussain helped Karachi Whites qualify for the Super Eight stage of the 2016–17 Quaid-e-Azam Trophy, taking 4 wickets for 103 runs against Lahore Whites.

Hussain played 107 first-class, 73 List A and 60 Twenty20 matches between the 2000/01 and 2017/18 seasons, taking 325 wickets in first-class cricket.
