= Daho Ould Kablia =

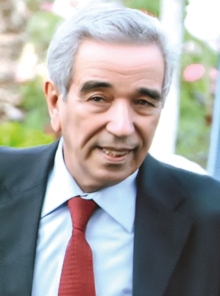
Ahoy Ould Kablia

Daho Ould Kablia (دحو ولد قابلية) (born May 4, 1933) is an Algerian politician who served as interior minister (Ministre de l'Intérieur et des Collectivités Locales).

In the mid-to-late-2000s, he was the Algerian Minister-Delegate to the Minister of State for the Interior and Local Authorities, responsible for Local Authorities.

In October 2024, he was appointed chairman of the committee responsible for amendments, with the aim of carrying out the administrative redistricting of Algeria.
