= Zohaib Khan =

Pakistani cricketer (born 1984)

Personal information
- Born: 20 March 1984 (age 42); Peshawar, Khyber Pakhtunkhwa, Pakistan
- Batting: Right-handed
- Bowling: Slow left-arm orthodox
- Role: All-Rounder

Domestic team information
- Years: Team
- 2011-2015: Peshawar Panthers
- 2016: Lahore Qalandars
- 2017: Islamabad United
- 2019–present: Khyber Pakhtunkhwa
- Source: Cricinfo, 20 January 2021

Zohaib Khan (born 20 March 1984) is a Pakistani former cricketer. On 4 November 2018, he was named the man of the match in the final of the 2018–19 Quaid-e-Azam One Day Cup, for his unbeaten innings of 68 runs helping Habib Bank Limited win the tournament. In March 2019, he was named in Khyber Pakhtunkhwa's squad for the 2019 Pakistan Cup.

In September 2019, he was named in Khyber Pakhtunkhwa's squad for the 2019–20 Quaid-e-Azam Trophy tournament. In February 2021, he began to undertake coaching courses with the Pakistan Cricket Board.
