= Sayed Tayib al-Madani =

Member of al-Qaeda

An alleged member of al-Qaeda, Sayed Tayib al-Madani (also Abu Fadhl al-Makkee, Sidi Tayyib) was said to have served on the initial Shura council of the group, and to have been a financial overseer who had to approve any expenditure over $1000 while the group was organising itself in the Sudan.

== Early activity ==
A veteran of the Soviet invasion of Afghanistan, al-Madani lost part of his lower leg during a battle. He began running operations at Taba farms, where he sold sugar, palm oil and soap from approximately 1991. By 1993, he was acting as the chief financial officer of al-Qaeda in the Sudan, and was noted instructing a member to travel through Baku, Azerbaijan to reach Chechnya to aid Ibn Khattab.

According to the testimony of Jamal Fadl, who claimed to share a Bank Shmal account with al-Madani, al-Madani was involved in a 1993 pursuit of nuclear weapons for the organisation and claimed to have found a source for uranium and asked Fadl to pass on his requisition for $1.5 million. Fadl also claimed that al-Madani had an account with Barclay's Bank in England. Approximately two years later, he also arranged the transport of Mujahideen to support Ibn Khattab's arrival in Chechnya.

== Arrest ==
In May 1997, al-Madani turned himself in to Saudi authorities in 1997, and was subsequently arrested. American efforts to interrogate him were rebuffed by the Saudis, and he was pardoned the same year in exchange for his cooperation. In September 1998, after al-Madani had already been released, Vice President Al Gore met with Crown Prince Abdullah, and again repeated the request for access.

Some have suggested that he was thereafter targeted for assassination by the National Islamic Front.

Following the September 11, 2001 attacks, Fox News reported that "the west" had recruited al-Madani post-1998.
