= Mohtashim Ali =

Pakistani cricketer (born 1981)

Personal information
- Full name: Syed Mohtashim Ali
- Born: 21 July 1981 (age 45); Karachi
- Batting: Left-handed
- Bowling: Slow left arm orthodox
- Source: Cricinfo, 16 July 2020

Mohtashim Ali (born 21 July 1981) is a Pakistani cricketer who has made more than 100 first-class appearances. He made his first-class debut on 2 January 2002, for Rest of Baluchistan in the 2001–02 Quaid-e-Azam Trophy. He made his Twenty20 debut on 1 December 2013, for State Bank of Pakistan in the 2013–14 Faysal Bank T20 Cup for Departments.
