= Tayeb Zitouni =

Algerian politician (1956–2025)

- الطيب زيتوني
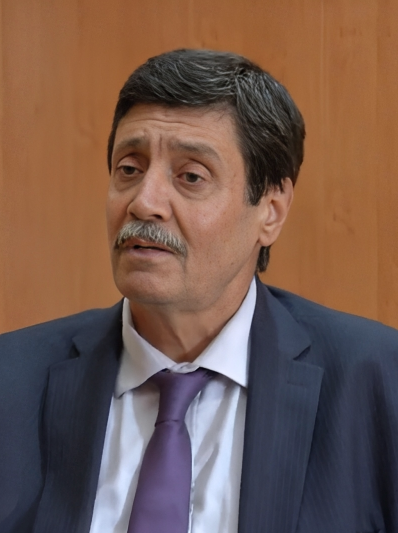

Minister of War Veterans and Rights Holders
- In office 25 May 2017 – 8 July 2021
- President: Abdelaziz Bouteflika; Abdelmadjid Tebboune
- Prime Minister: Abdelmadjid Tebboune; Ahmed Ouyahia; Noureddine Bedoui; Sabri Boukadoum (interim); Abdelaziz Djerad
- Preceded by: Mohamed Aïssa
- Succeeded by: Laid Rebiga

Personal details
- Born: 24 September 1956 Oran, French Algeria
- Died: 3 November 2025 (aged 69)

Tayeb Zitouni (Arabic: الطيب زيتوني; 24 September 1956 – 3 November 2025) was an Algerian politician who served as Minister of Moudjahidine (War Veterans) and Rights Holders from 2014 to 2021. He died on 3 November 2025, at the age of 69.
