= Pavol Adami =

Pavol Adami (Note: Slovakian; also Adámi Pál in Hungarian, Paul Adami in German) (9 July 1739, in Beluša – 21 September 1795) was a scientist and scholar, considered one of the world's first veterinarians. He was one of the first recorded experts in the infectious diseases of animals.
