= Tayeb Abdallah =

Al-Tayeb Abdallah (died 24 February 2007) was a former Sudanese president of the Sudanese football (soccer) club Al-Hilal (Omdurman).

== Career at Al Hilal ==
Abdallah started his career at Al Hilal as vice secretary of the club in 1963. After great organisational skills, Abdallah was appointed as secretary then president in 1968. In 1999 after spending 30 years with Al Hilal, Abdallah decided to step down due to his medical conditions.

== Medical Conditions ==
Abdallah had undergone a surgical operation in Egypt . Soon after that, he died on 24 February 2007 leaving a great legacy as the longest president of a sports club in Sudan. He was nicknamed as Al-zaeem, (the Leader), and The Spiritual Father of Al Hilal since he was greatly respected throughout the whole sports community in Sudan.
