= El Kseur =

El Kseur Leqṣeṛ (Kabyle)
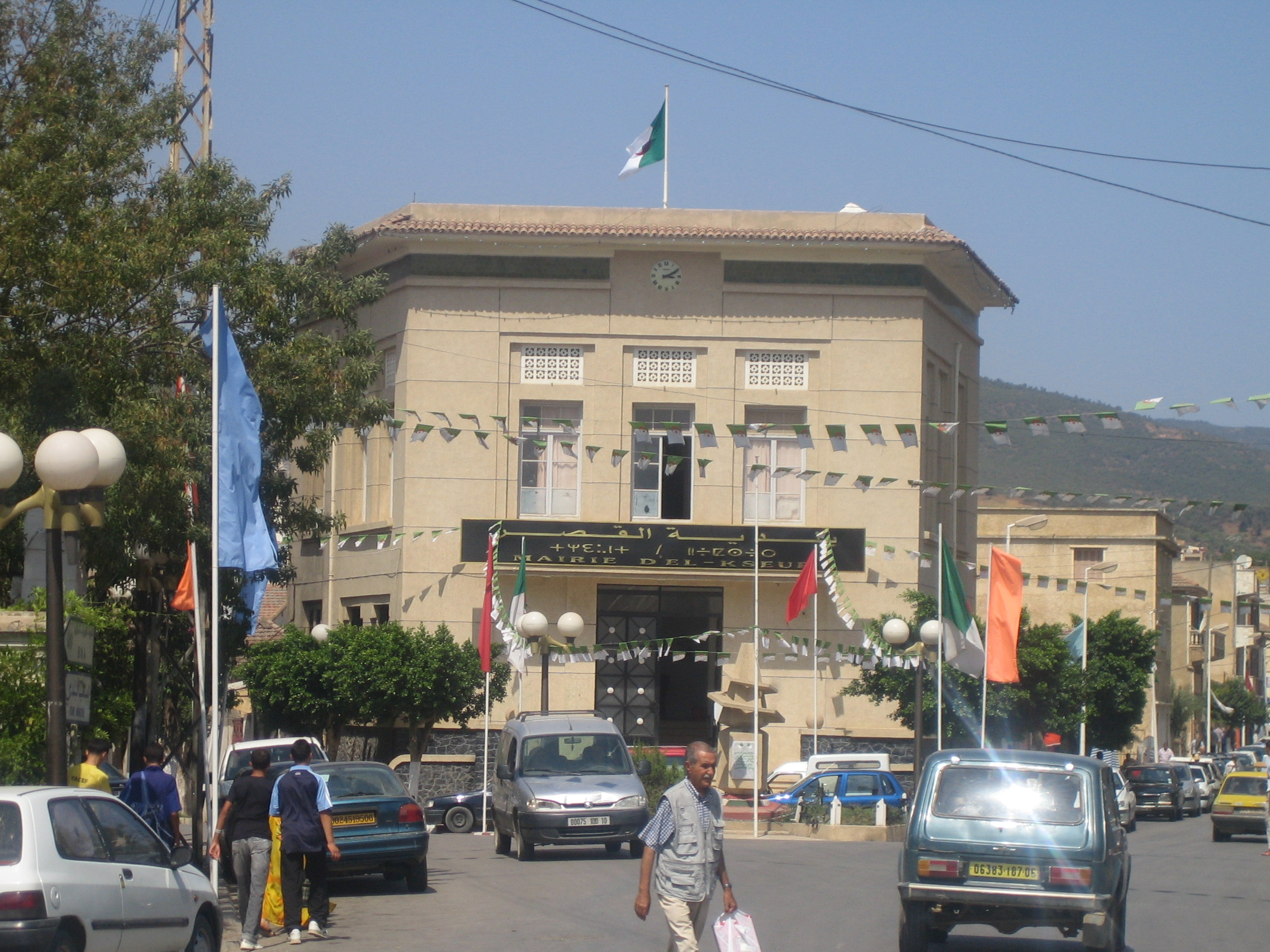

- Location within Algeria
- Coordinates: 36°41′4″N 4°51′8″E
- Country: Algeria
- Province: Bejaia
- Time zone: UTC+1 (West Africa Time)

El Kseur (Kabyle: Leqṣeṛ; Arabic: القصر) is a commune in northern Algeria in the Béjaïa Province. The Béni Mansour–Bejaïa railway serves this community with SNTF rail service.

== Environment ==
The relief of El Kseur is characterized by its mountainous aspect. Indeed, the town is located in a narrow valley between the Ibarissen massif (the last rocky massif of Djurdjura in the east before the Gouraya massif) and the first comforts of the Babors in the South East as well as a bed Of wadi important that separates the city center to the city Berchiche one of the oldest cities of the city.

=== Hydrography ===
The hydrographic network contains a large drainage basin, namely the Soummam basin. The town of El Kseur is supplied with water by the Tichy-Haf Dam located in the locality of Bouhamza. The dam is fed by the rain and melt water of the Djurdjura's nival coat. It has a storage capacity of 150 million m3 and supplies the wilaya of Béjaïa with 20,000 m3 / day.

=== Climate ===
The town of El Kseur enjoys a temperate and humid climate with a mild winter characteristic of the Mediterranean zones and an important rainfall, like all the towns of the eastern half of the Algerian coast. Due to the mountainous massifs surrounding the city, it snow every year in winter between December and February for high altitudes of over 600 m.

== Name ==
The indigenous people called the town of El Kseur Iɣil Mɛebed (in Berber). On the other hand, the name of El Kurs comes from the Arabic qasar, in Algerian Arabic qsar, plural qsur, meaning "palace" or "fortified village", berberized in Leqser; The municipality takes its name from a courthouse which gave its celebrity to the city. Another hypothesis, more probable, gives origin of the name the citadel (qasr) erected in 1327 during the siege of Bgayet by the Zianides. Ibn Khaldun speaks of it in his book "History of the Berbers".

== History ==
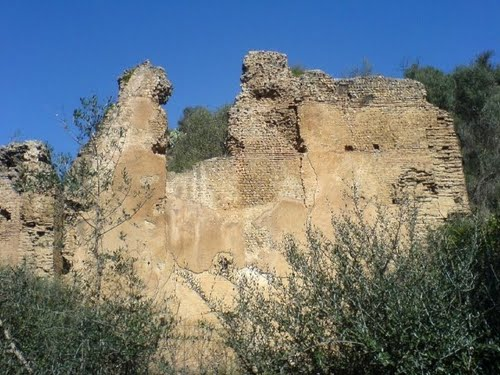
Roman ruins of Tubusuptu, Tiklat, El Kseur.

In Roman times, El Kseur was known as Tubusuctu (or even "Tubusuptu"). It was a Roman colony founded by Augustus for military veterans. Economically, the colony was known for its olive oil. Today, Roman ruins include baths, which are well preserved.

=== French Rule ===
During the colonization, El Kseur was in 1872 a center of European settlement. Many Alsatians and Lorrainers settled there, especially after the French defeat of 1870 against Prussia. Nearly 470 settlers settled in El Kseur, which took the name of Bitche. This name will not stay long since El Kseur or Ighil Maabed will take over. Today still the colonial district is present, it is on the national road, near the town hall in particular.

During the Algerian War, El Kseur was one of the first regions in Kabylie to join the FLN in 1954, a group of wanted militants of the FLN of the region joined the maquis; Salah Hocine, Tahar Amirouchen, Khatri Madjid, Arezki Oukmamou and his brother Hocine, Mokrane Harani, Kamel Chikhi, Larbi Touati and so many others have to quote their why say so much else they are cleaner. They will all become valuable officers in the ALN. El Kseur was the scene of several battles between the colonial army and the guerrillas of wilaya III. Faced with a threat France set up prohibited zones in order to cut the resistance of the population and thus deprive them of popular support. Thus, in 1955, in the Aures first, then in Kabylia, and then in the rest of Algeria, population regrouping camps were built. In El Koire, at first, the mountaineers who had been driven out of their villages, often in violence, had to settle near the river in makeshift camps made by their care. It was in 1959 and in 1960, in the context of the realization of the Plan of Constantine, that houses were erected. They were mostly made at Berchiche, that is, far from European settlers. These regroupment camps were for some appalling, Michel Rocard presented them in 1958 as concentration camps of slow death. In Ighzer Amokrane, in the Soummam valley, nearly 1,000 people were piled up in deplorable sanitary conditions, infant mortality was very high and hunger deaths were counted by hundreds each month.

=== Scouts ===
Born on June 14, 1928, in Ait Oussalah, Salhi Hocine made his early footsteps in revolutionary militancy in Khemis-Miliana, with his classmate Si M'Hamed Bougara (another future chahid). In 1944, on his return to his village of El-Kseur, he set himself the task of strengthening the structure of the Algerian Muslim Scouts movement, to which his contribution gave rise to considerable growth. His conduct and devotion quickly made him the driving force of this organization, which represents for him the framework of ideal expression of his patriotic convictions. He fell in the field of honor on May 5, 1958.

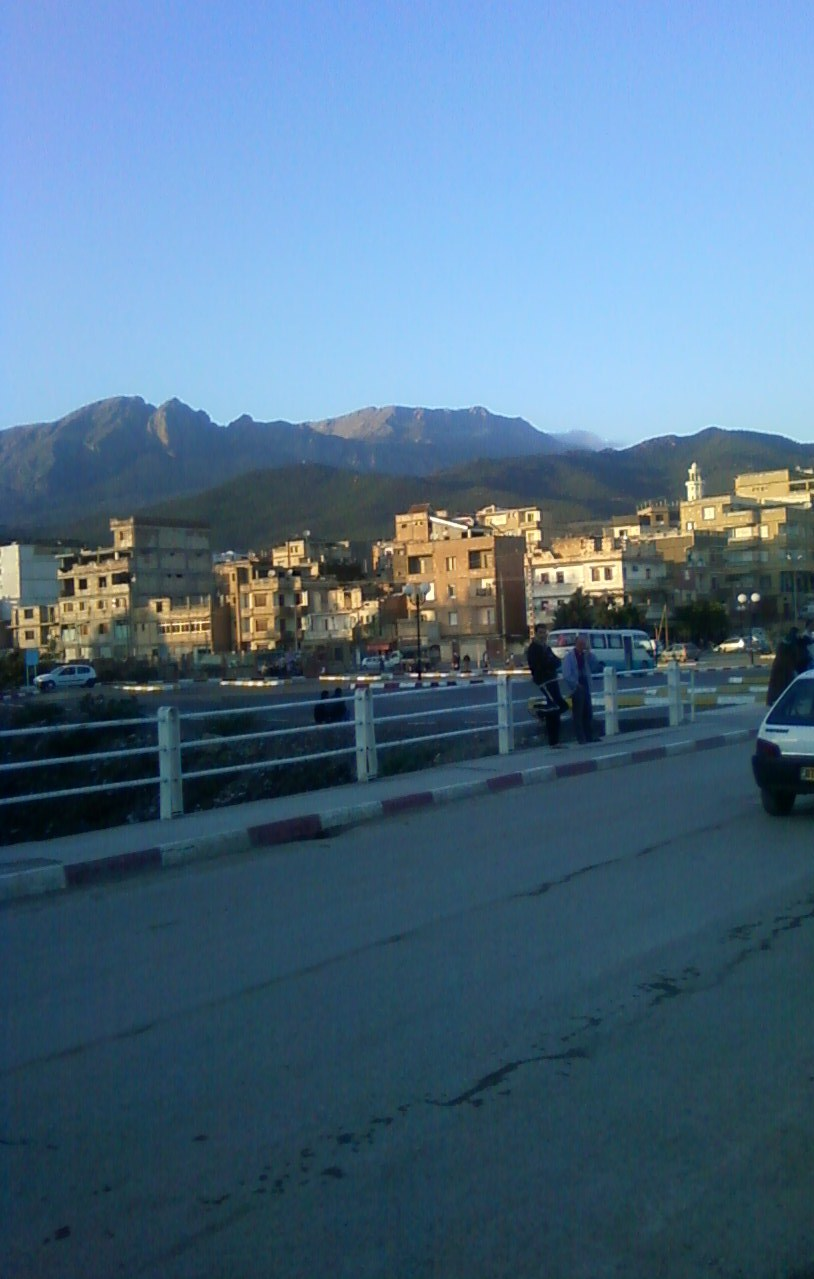
Berchiche, El-Kseur.

== Demographics ==
In 2008, the municipality had 29,842 inhabitants. The evolution of the number of inhabitants is known through the population censuses carried out in the municipality since 1980. The city of El Kseur is the fifth largest city of the wilaya of Béjaïa after the cities of Béjaïa, Akbou, Amizour and Kherrata . The city is also an important urban agglomeration of Kabylia.

== Culture ==
El Kseur has always been an important cultural, intellectual and architectural center. She maintained the customs. Thus, Yennayer, the feast day of the Berber year inherited from the Berber era, is always celebrated in El Kseur. The cultural scene is animated by its cultural centers and its associations such as: the association 4e art lehri association scientific Lefnar. Association green tunnel. Troop Tafat n Usirem. The Scout Salhi Hocine Group, which has always assured major events.
