= Tanvir Ahmed =

Pakistani cricketer

Personal information
- Full name: Tanvir Ahmed
- Born: 20 December 1978 (age 47); Kuwait City, Al Asimah, Kuwait
- Batting: Right-handed
- Bowling: Right-arm fast-medium
- Role: All-rounder

International information
- National side: Pakistan (2010–2013)
- Test debut (cap 204): 20 November 2010 v South Africa
- Last Test: 14 February 2013 v South Africa
- ODI debut (cap 183): 2 May 2011 v West Indies
- Last ODI: 28 May 2011 v Ireland
- Only T20I (cap 37): 30 December 2010 v New Zealand

Domestic team information
- Years: Team
- 1998/99–2009/10: Karachi Blues
- 2001/02–2004/05: Allied Bank Limited
- 2001/02: Public Works Department
- 2001/02–2010/11: Karachi Whites
- 2003/04: Karachi
- 2004/05-2009: Karachi Zebras
- 2005/06–2006/07: Karachi Urban
- 2005/06: ZTBL
- 2006/07–2008/09: Sind
- 2007/08: Baluchistan
- 2008/09–2009/10: Sind Dolphins
- 2008/09–2010/11: Karachi Dolphins

Career statistics
Competition	Test	ODI	FC	LA
Matches	5	2	132	71
Runs scored	170	18	3,665	494
Batting average	34.00	18.00	20.14	13.35
100s/50s	0/1	0/0	0/16	0/0
Top score	57	18	90	47
Balls bowled	707	60	23,866	3,082
Wickets	17	2	512	80
Bowling average	26.64	41.50	27.56	36.72
5 wickets in innings	1	0	28	0
10 wickets in match	0	0	8	0
Best bowling	6/120	1/38	8/53	3/27
Catches/stumpings	1/–	1/–	39/–	17/–
- Source: CricketArchive, 22 November 2013

Tanvir Ahmed (Urdu: تنويراحمد; born 20 December 1978) is a Pakistani former Test cricketer born in Kuwait. Ahmed mainly played as a fast-bowler. He played for Pakistan in a first-class match against Worcestershire in the tour of England in 2010. He was later chosen to play in the second Test in Pakistan's 2010 home series against South Africa in the UAE in which he took six wickets (6/120) during the first innings.

== Early life ==
He was born in Kuwait but his family returned to Karachi a little over a decade later because of the Gulf War, and he first began to play cricket in the city's streets at the age of 14.

== ODI ==
Tanvir made his ODI debut on 2 May 2011 in the 4th One Day International against the West Indies, along with Usman Salahuddin, taking 1 wicket for 45 runs off 6 overs.

== See also ==
- List of Pakistan Test cricketers who have taken five wickets on debut
- List of Test cricketers born in non-Test playing nations
