= Tayba TV =

Tayba TV Tayba Satellite Channel
- Type: satellite television network
- Country: Sudan
- Headquarters: Khartoum, Sudan

Programming
- Language: Arabic

Ownership
- Owner: Tayba Media Group

History
- Founded: 24 January 2008
- Launched: 24 January 2008

Links
- Website: tayba.tv

Tayba TV, better known as the Tayba Satellite Channel (قناة طيبة الفضائية), is a Sudanese television network owned by the Tayba Media Group. The channel has had administrative problems since January 2020, beginning with its alignment in favor of the former president, and has temporarily lost its operating status from within Sudan in that year alone. The channel also claimed to broadcast Islamist proselytism to Africa.

== History ==
Tayba TV started broadcasting on 24 January 2008. As of 31 December 2019, Al-Andalous operated ten channels, including Tayba, which were ruled as illegal by the Sudanese government, following the passing of an amended constitution. The channel was owned by Islamist cleric Abdelhay Youssef, who used the channel to broadcast speeches delivering his worldview, as well as support for Omar al-Bashir. Youssef also reportedly claimed to support Islamic terrorist groups in the region and had even condemned the first Sudanese women's football league in October that year.

On 7 January 2020, Tayba TV's headquarters in Khartoum were seized by the authorities. Its head Abdel Hai Yousef was taken into court after the channel was reportedly airing content denying accusations made by the deposed president Omar al-Bashir. Following these accusations, the channel issued an announcement claiming that it had monitored "attacks and ferocious accusations" against the former Sudanese president on some newspapers and social media platforms, without any justification, moral or legal base. In line with its seizure, the channel was forced to suspend its broadcasts and close its parent company, Al-Andalus Media Production, in turn owner of Tayba Media Group. A protest was staged outside its facilities on 10 February, with its staff claiming that they did not work based on ideological or political boundaries. The channel temporarily had to broadcast from Turkey in order to evade Sudanese authorities, resuming its broadcasts on 14 April. In an interview published on the Al-Intibaha newspaper on 9 April, "heavy debts" were removed as part of the relocation. Al-Andalus owned a channel there, Durar, and decided to use its satellite frequency to broadcast Tayba TV. The owners of the back-up were fugitives who fled the original channel in Sudan.
