= Tayyab Abbas =

Pakistani cricketer (born 1994)

Personal information
- Born: 6 September 1994 (age 32); Attock, Pakistan
- Batting: Left-handed
- Bowling: Left arm Medium fast

Domestic team information
- Years: Team
- 2013/2014–2017/18: Rawalpindi

Career statistics
Competition	FC	LA
Matches	5	3
Runs scored	32	26
Batting average	5.33	13.00
100s/50s	0/0	0/0
Top score	28*	21
Balls bowled	759	138
Wickets	11	2
Bowling average	36.09	76.00
5 wickets in innings	0	0
10 wickets in match	0	0
Best bowling	3/68	1/49
Catches/stumpings	1/–	2/–
- Source: ESPNcricinfo, 13 September 2018

Tayyab Abbas (born 6 September 1994) is a Pakistani cricketer. He made his List A debut on 14 January 2017 for Rawalpindi in the 2016–17 Regional One Day Cup.
