= Tayeb Belaiz =

Algerian jurist and politician (1948–2023)

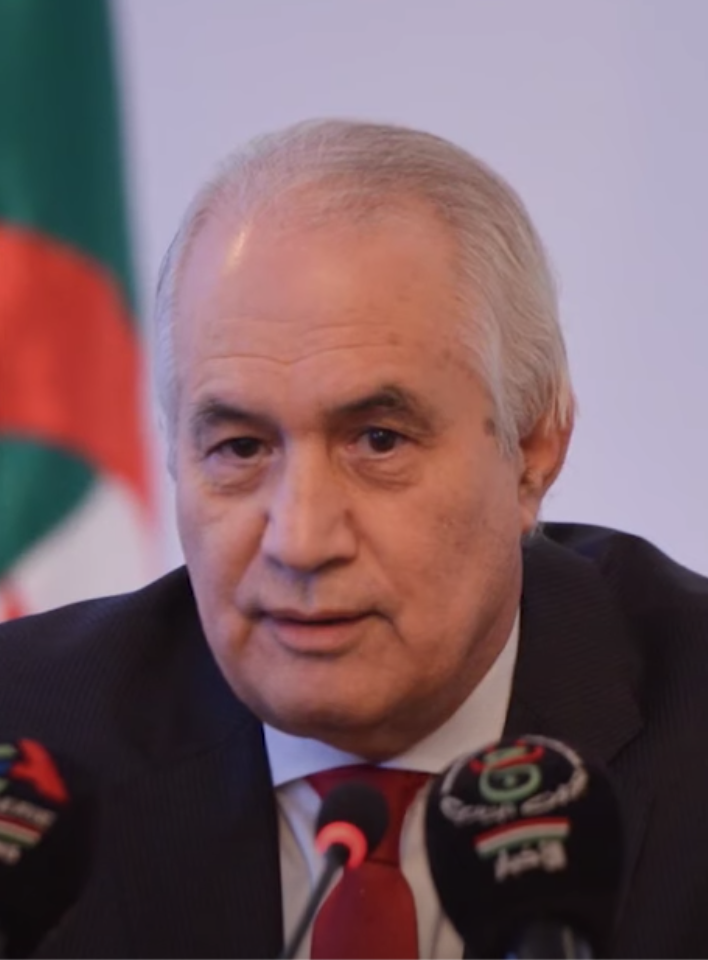
- Belaïz in 2019

Minister of Interior
- In office 11 September 2013 – 14 May 2015
- President: Abdelaziz Bouteflika
- Prime Minister: Abdelmalek Sellal
- Preceded by: Daho Ould Kablia
- Succeeded by: Noureddine Bedoui

Minister of Justice
- In office 6 September 2003 – 29 March 2012
- President: Abdelaziz Bouteflika
- Prime Minister: Abdelaziz Belkhadem; Ahmed Ouyahia

Minister of Employment and National Solidarity
- In office 2002–2004
- President: Abdelaziz Bouteflika
- Prime Minister: Ali Benflis

Personal details
- Born: 21 August 1948 Maghnia, French Algeria
- Died: 13 May 2023 (aged 74) Oran, Algeria
- Resting place: Ain Al Bayda cemetery, Oran

Tayeb Belaiz (Arabic: الطيب بلعيز; 21 August 1948 – 13 May 2023) was an Algerian jurist and politician who held different cabinet posts. He served as Algeria's minister of justice between 2004 and 2012 and minister of interior between 2013 and 2015.

== Early life and education ==
Belaiz was born in Maghnia on 21 August 1948. He held a bachelor's degree in law.

== Career ==
Belaiz started his career at the Ministry of Foreign Affairs and then joined the Algerian judiciary system. He served in various public posts before holding cabinet position, including presidential advisor, and court chair of Saida and Oran. He also worked as the president of the Algerian supreme court.

Belaiz served as the minister of employment and national solidarity in the cabinet formed by Prime Minister Ali Benflis in 2002. He was appointed minister of justice in the cabinet headed by Prime Minister Ahmed Ouyahia in April 2004. He was reappointed minister of justice in the cabinet of Prime Minister Abdelaziz Belkhadem on 25 May 2006.

While serving as minister of justice, Belaiz was also appointed president of the constitutional council on 30 March 2012 and served in that post until September 2013. In a September 2013 reshuffle Belaiz was appointed minister of interior in the cabinet led by Prime Minister Abdelmalek Sellal. Belaiz replaced Daho Ould Kablia in the post.

Belaiz was again named the head of the constitutional council in February 2019, and his second term ended in April 2019 when he resigned from the office.

== Death ==
Belaiz died in Oran on 13 May 2023, at the age of 74. He was buried the same day in Oran's Ain Al Bayda cemetery.
