= Taybeh, Petra =

Taybeh الطيبة
- Village
- Location in Jordan
- Coordinates: 30°14′57″N 35°27′43″E
- Country: Jordan
- Governorate: Ma'an
- Subdistrict: Petra

Population (2015)
  - Total: 5,747
- Time zone: GMT +2
  - Summer (DST): +3

Taybeh (Arabic: الطيبة) is a village in southern Jordan, administratively part of the Petra District of the Ma'an Governorate. It is located 10 kilometers (6.2 mi) southeast of Petra and is situated on a high hill overlooking the surrounding mountain range. In the 2015 census, it had a population 5,747, and is the second largest locality in the Petra District, after Wadi Musa.

Taybeh is best known for its Taybet Zaman Hotel and Resort, a tourist village accommodating visitors to Petra. The resort was established out of Taybeh's 19th-century old village, which was largely abandoned as its residents moved into more modern homes in the 1960s. Its traditional stone-built dwellings were converted into Bedouin-style lodging and includes a bazaar, hammam (Turkish bathhouse), museum, restaurant, and bakery. The tourist village is still owned and managed by the former residents.

== Bibliography ==
- Cohen-Mor, Dalya (2015). Out of Jordan: A Sabra in the Peace Corps Tells Her Story. Skyhorse Publishing. ISBN 978-1-5107-0037-6.
