= El Taib =

El Tayib or El Taib is a surname of Arabic origin. Notable people with the surname include:

- Abdullah El Tayib
- Griselda El Tayib
- Tarik El Taib
