= Mohammad Imran (cricketer, born 1989) =

Pakistani cricketer (born 1989)

Personal information
- Born: 26 April 1989 (age 37); Sialkot, Pakistan
- Source: ESPNcricinfo, 20 November 2016

Mohammad Imran (born 26 April 1989) is a Pakistani cricketer. He made his first-class debut for Sialkot in the 2007–08 Quaid-e-Azam Trophy on 25 November 2007.
