= Jeremy Keenan =

British social anthropologist

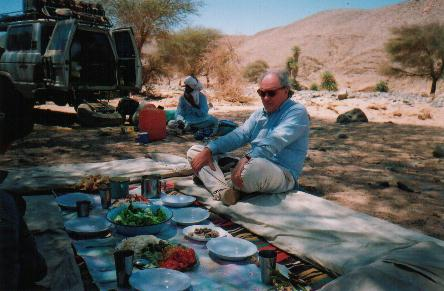
- Professor Jeremy Keenan
- Born: 1945 (age 80–81)
- Occupation: Social anthropologist
- Known for: Research on terrorism and security in the Sahara and Sahel regions
- Notable work: The Dark Sahara

Jeremy Keenan (born 1945) is a British social anthropologist. The regional focuses of his research are the Sahara, North Africa and the Sahel region, and he concentrates on anthropology of development, security and globalisation. He has published a number of books and articles about the approaches of the United States to counter terrorism in Africa.

Keenan has long argued that Islamist terror groups in North Africa are masterminded by Algeria, with the knowledge of the CIA and other intelligence services, which stage "false flag" attacks to expand Algerian and US political influence over the region and its economic resources. In his book The Dark Sahara, Keenan accuses the United States and Algeria of having conspired to fabricate evidence and exaggerate the threat of al-Qaeda terrorism in Northern Africa. He calls the "global war on terror" a deception and claims that it is causing immense damage to the peoples of the Sahara, namely the Tuareg.

On 22 May 2012, he alleged in a BBC interview that the Algerian government (despite being officially secular) was backing Ansar Dine, both because Ansar Dine justified the existence of the government's security apparatus, and because backing it allowed Algeria to "project power in what it sees as its sphere of influence".

== Works ==
- The Tuareg: People of Ahaggar, Allen Lane, 1977
- Sahara Man: Travelling with the Tuareg, John Murray Publishers, 2001
- The Lesser Gods of the Sahara: Social Change and Contested Terrain Amongst the Tuareg of Algeria, Frank Cass Publishers, 2004
- The Dark Sahara: America's War on Terror in Africa, Pluto Press, 2009
- The Dying Sahara: US Imperialism and Terror in Africa, Pluto Press, 2012
- "Report on in Amenas – Inquest Cover-up and Western Involvement in Algerian State Crimes", International State Crime Initiative (ISCI), 2016
