= Suleiman Tayeb Ahmed Salem =

Nicaraguan Ambassador

His Excellency Suleiman Tayeb Ahmed Salem الطيب أحمد سليمان سالم

Sahrawi Ambassador to Nicaragua
- Incumbent
- Assumed office 8 January 2010
- Prime Minister: Abdelkader Taleb Omar

Sahrawi Ambassador to Panama
- In office 20 November 1997 – 24 January 2008
- Prime Minister: Mahfoud Ali Beiba; Bouchraya Hammoudi Bayoun; Abdelkader Taleb Omar
- Succeeded by: Ali Mahamound

Personal details
- Party: POLISARIO
- Spouse: Mayra Luisa Sandoval de Tayeb
- Children: Salim Tayeb
- Occupation: Diplomat

Suleiman Tayeb Ahmed Salem (Arabic: الطيب أحمد سليمان سالم) is the current Sahrawi ambassador to Nicaragua, also accredited non-resident ambassador to Belize, with a base in Managua.

On August 30, 2000 he was injured in an accident, when the light aircraft he was travelling in crashed immediately after taking off from Albrook "Marcos A. Gelabert" International Airport.

== Diplomatic postings ==
On November 20, 1997 he presented his letter of credentials to President Ernesto Pérez Balladares as the new Sahrawi ambassador to the Republic of Panama. He was later in 1998 also accredited as non-resident ambassador to Costa Rica until 2000; and on November 7, 2005 he presented his credentials to Sir Colville Young, as the first Sahrawi non-resident ambassador to Belize.

On January 30, 2010, he presented his letter of credentials to President Daniel Ortega as the Sahrawi ambassador to the Republic of Nicaragua, with another four envoyees. He had previously presented the credentials on January 8 to Nicaraguan Foreign Affairs Minister Samuel Santos López.

== Honours and awards ==
On January 24, 2008, Suleiman Tayeb was awarded Panama's highest honour, the Order of Manuel Amador Guerrero (Grand Cross grade), given to him by vice president and Minister of Foreign Affairs Samuel Lewis Navarro, for professionalism in his decade of diplomatic service in the country.

Award or decoration	Country	Date	Place	Note	Ref
Grand Cross of the Order of Manuel Amador Guerrero	Panama	24 January 2008	Panama City	Panamanian highest honour.	
