= Souk el Tayeb =

Souk el Tayeb is a farmers' market located in Jisr El Wati, Tohwita, Lebanon. It is held on Saturdays from 9:00 a.m. to 2:00 p.m. and features products from more than 90 producers from across Lebanon. The site also includes a café serving breakfast and lunch, a dog park, a children's playground, and an urban garden. Admission is free.
