= Tayyab Riaz =

Pakistani cricketer (born 1992)

Personal information
- Born: 20 February 1992 (age 34)
- Source: Cricinfo, 17 September 2018

Tayyab Riaz (born 20 February 1992) is a Pakistani cricketer. He made his first-class debut for Khan Research Laboratories in the 2012–13 President's Trophy on 3 October 2012.
