= Noureddine Bedoui =

Prime Minister of Algeria in 2019

- نور الدين بدوي
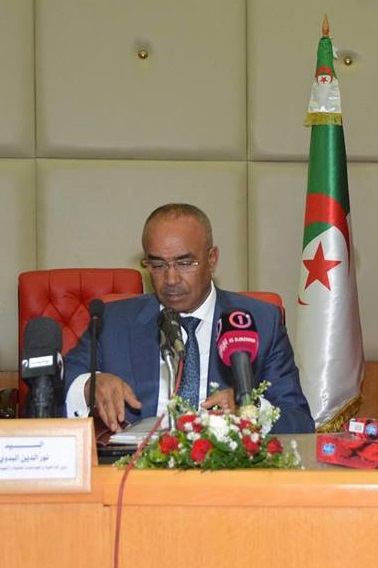
- Bedoui in 2018

17th Prime Minister of Algeria
- In office 12 March 2019 – 19 December 2019
- President: Abdelaziz Bouteflika; Abdelkader Bensalah (Acting)
- Preceded by: Ahmed Ouyahia
- Succeeded by: Sabri Boukadoum (Acting)

Personal details
- Born: 22 December 1959 (age 66) Aïn Taya, Algeria
- Party: Independent

Noureddine Bedoui (Arabic: نور الدين بدوي; born 22 December 1959) is an Algerian politician. He was Prime Minister of Algeria from 11 March 2019 to 19 December 2019.

== Biography ==
=== Origins and formation ===
Noureddine Bedoui was born on 22 December 1959 in Ain Taya, in the wilaya (state) of Algiers, in a family from Ouargla. In 1985, Noureddine Bedoui joined the National School of Administration (ENA) in the promotion Mohamed Laid Al Khalifa. He graduated from it, and later became auditor at the Court of Auditors, then wali (governor) of three different williyas, listed in succession:

- Sidi Bel-Abbès
- Bordj-Bou-Arreridj
- Setif and Constantine

=== Political career ===
Bedoui was Minister of Training and Professional Education from 11 September 2013 to 14 May 2015, before being appointed Minister of the Interior and Local Authorities on 14 May 2015. On 12 March 2019, he became Prime Minister, after the resignation of Ahmed Ouyahia and the withdrawal of Abdelaziz Bouteflika in the presidential election, as a result of mass demonstrations. On 14 March, the formation of the government was announced from the end of next week. The deadline was largely exceeded. The government was finally formed on 31 March. Two days later, on 2 April, President Abdelaziz Bouteflika resigned. Bedoui and his government later resigned as Prime Minister on 19 December 2019.

Government offices
Preceded by Ahmed Ouyahia	Prime Minister of Algeria; 2019	Succeeded by Sabri Boukadoum; Acting
