= 2008–09 National Twenty20 Cup =

Cricket tournament

- Dates: 4 – 8 October 2008
- Administrator: Pakistan Cricket Board
- Cricket format: Twenty20
- Tournament format(s): Round-robin and knockout
- Host: (Pakistan) Lahore
- Champions: Sialkot Stallions (3rd title)
- Participants: 13
- Matches: 18

The 2008–09 RBS Twenty-20 Cup was the fourth season of the RBS Twenty-20 Cup in Pakistan, sponsored by Royal Bank of Scotland. It was held in Lahore from 4 to 8 October 2008. The Sialkot Stallions won their third overall and consecutive title by defeating the Karachi Dolphins in the final. As the winners, the Stallions qualified for the 2008 Champions League Twenty20, which was later cancelled.

== Format ==
The format remained the same from the previous edition. The 13 teams were divided into four groups: Pool A with four teams, Pool B, C and D with three each. Each group played a single round-robin tournament and the top team from each group advanced to the semi-finals. The winners of the semi-finals played the final.

Awarded points
Result	Points
Won	2 points
No result	1 point
Loss	0 points

The position of the teams in the points table is determined by:

- Total points
- Won
- Lost (fewest)
- Net run rate

=== Prize money ===
The prize money was increased from the previous edition.

- Winners: Rs. 2,500,000
- Runners-up: Rs. 1,000,000

== Results ==
=== Teams and standings ===
The top team from each group qualify for the semi-finals.

Pool A
Team	Pld	W	L	NR	Pts	NRR
Karachi Dolphins	3	3	0	0	6	+1.052
Faisalabad Wolves	3	2	1	0	4	+0.454
Lahore Eagles	3	1	2	0	2	+0.153
Abbottabad Rhinos	3	0	3	0	0	–1.607

Pool B
Team	Pld	W	L	NR	Pts	NRR
Sialkot Stallions	2	2	0	0	4	+1.047
Hyderabad Hawks	2	1	1	0	2	+0.524
Karachi Zebras	2	0	2	0	0	–1.550

Pool C
Team	Pld	W	L	NR	Pts	NRR
Islamabad Leopards	2	1	1	0	2	+0.216
Multan Tigers	2	1	1	0	2	+0.089
Peshawar Panthers	2	1	1	0	2	–0.245

Pool D
Team	Pld	W	L	NR	Pts	NRR
Lahore Lions	2	2	0	0	4	+0.575
Rawalpindi Rams	2	1	1	0	2	+1.350
Quetta Bears	2	0	2	0	0	–1.925

Qualified for semi-finals

=== Knockout stage ===
Semifinals
A1	Karachi Dolphins	69/1
C1	Islamabad Leopards	68
B1	Sialkot Stallions	117/6
D1	Lahore Lions	111/6

Final
A1	Karachi Dolphins	125/9
B1	Sialkot Stallions	126/3

== Fixtures ==
=== Group stage ===
Group A

4 October
10:00
Scorecard

Karachi Dolphins; 184/7 (20 overs)	v	Lahore Eagles; 159/9 (20 overs)
Fawad Alam 55 (42); Mohammad Naved 3/33 (4 overs)		Asif Raza 53* (21); Anwar Ali 3/8 (3 overs)

Karachi Dolphins won by 25 runs
Bagh-e-Jinnah, Lahore
Umpires: Iqbal Butt and Zaheer Ahmed
Player of the match: Fawad Alam (Karachi Dolphins)

- Lahore Eagles won the toss and elected to field.
- Sohail Khan (Karachi Dolphins); Ahmed Butt, Ali Raza, Asif Khan, Mohammad Naved, Mohammad Saeed and Suleman Khan (Lahore Eagles) all made their T20 debuts.

4 October
10:00
Scorecard

Faisalabad Wolves; 148/6 (20 overs)	v	Abbottabad Rhinos; 128 (18.5 overs)
Mohammad Hafeez 62 (53); Khalid Usman 3/21 (4 overs)		Riaz Kail 25 (33); Mohammad Talha 3/26 (3.5 overs)

Faisalabad Wolves won by 20 runs
Lahore City Cricket Association Ground
Umpires: Ijaz Ahmed and Zameer Haider
Player of the match: Mohammad Talha (Faisalabad Wolves)

- Abbottabad Rhinos won the toss and elected to field.
- Armaghan Elahi, Ghulam Mohammad, Khalid Usman, Rashid Mansoor, Usman Khan, Yasir Shah (Abbottabad Rhinos); Mohammad Talha and Usman Arshad (Faisalabad Wolves) all made their T20 debuts.

5 October
17:00
Scorecard

Karachi Dolphins; 155 (20 overs)	v	Faisalabad Wolves; 147/5 (20 overs)
Khurram Manzoor 34 (32); Saeed Ajmal 3/37 (4 overs)		Misbah-ul-Haq 48* (31); Shahid Afridi 2/16 (4 overs)

Karachi Dolphins won by 8 runs
Gaddafi Stadium, Lahore
Umpires: Mohammad Aslam and Nadeem Ghauri
Player of the match: Shahid Afridi (Karachi Dolphins)

- Karachi Dolphins won the toss and elected to bat.
- Ammar Mahmood (Faisalabad Wolves) and Faraz Ahmed (Karachi Dolphins) both made their T20 debuts.

5 October
20:30
Scorecard

Abbottabad Rhinos; 87 (15.4 overs)	v	Lahore Eagles; 88/2 (12.5 overs)
Usman Khan 23 (21); Usman Malik 3/22 (3 overs)		Ashfaq Ahmed 31 (25); Noor-ul-Amin 1/9 (4 overs)

Lahore Eagles won by 8 wickets
Gaddafi Stadium, Lahore
Umpires: Khalid Mahmood and Riazuddin
Player of the match: Ashfaq Ahmed (Lahore Eagles)

- Abbottabad Rhinos won the toss and elected to bat.
- Azam Khan, Noor-ul-Amin (Abbottabad Rhinos) and Azhar Attari (Lahore Eagles) made their T20 debuts.

6 October
13:00
Scorecard

Lahore Eagles; 106/8 (20 overs)	v	Faisalabad Wolves; 112/4 (18.4 overs)
Ashfaq Ahmed 22 (15); Asad Ali 2/17 (3 overs)		Mohammad Salman 41 (42); Azhar Ali 2/13 (3 overs)

Faisalabad Wolves won by 6 wickets
Lahore City Cricket Association Ground
Umpires: Kaukab Butt and Saleem Badar
Player of the match: Mohammad Salman (Faisalabad Wolves)

- Lahore Eagles won the toss and elected to bat.
- Asad Zarar (Faisalabad Wolves); Ali Haider, Junaid Malik and Shahab Basharat (Lahore Eagles) made their T20 debuts.

6 October
13:00
Scorecard

Abbottabad Rhinos; 96/9 (20 overs)	v	Karachi Dolphins; 99/4 (16.3 overs)
Adnan Raees 30 (30); Faraz Ahmed 3/15 (4 overs)		Afsar Nawaz 33* (35); Rashid Mansoor 2/26 (4 overs)

Karachi Dolphins won by 6 wickets
Gaddafi Stadium, Lahore
Umpires: Aleem Dar and Rasheed Bhatti
Player of the match: Faraz Ahmed (Karachi Dolphins)

- Abbottabad Rhinos won the toss and elected to bat.
- Mohammad Kashif (Abbottabad Rhinos) and Asad Shafiq (Karachi Dolphins) made their T20 debuts.

Group B

4 October
17:00 (D/N)
Scorecard

Sialkot Stallions; 179/9 (20 overs)	v	Karachi Zebras; 147/6 (20 overs)
Qaiser Abbas 49 (34); Fahad Khan 4/21 (4 overs)		Asif Zakir 58* (51); Sarfraz Ahmed 3/16 (4 overs)

Sialkot Stallions won by 32 runs
Gaddafi Stadium, Lahore
Umpires: Ahsan Raza and Anis Siddiqi
Player of the match: Sarfraz Ahmed (Sialkot Stallions)

- Sialkot Stallions won the toss and elected to bat.
- Ahmed Zeeshan, Misbah Khan, Saeed Bin Nasir, Shahzaib Hasan (Karachi Zebras); Ali Khan, Kamran Younis, Mohammad Ali and Shakeel Ansar (Sialkot Stallions) made their T20 debuts.

5 October
13:00
Scorecard

Hyderabad Hawks; 169/4 (20 overs)	v	Karachi Zebras; 139/9 (20 overs)
Rizwan Ahmed 57 (43); Tabish Khan 2/26 (4 overs)		Shahzaib Hasan 61 (32); Faisal Athar 3/7 (2 overs)

Hyderabad Hawks won by 30 runs
Gaddafi Stadium, Lahore
Umpires: Aleem Dar and Zameer Haider
Player of the match: Rizwan Ahmed (Hyderabad Hawks)

- Hyderabad Hawks won the toss and elected to bat.
- Aslam Sattar, Mir Ali (Hyderabad Hawks); Abdul Ameer and Shahzaib Ahmed (Karachi Zebras) made their T20 debuts.

6 October
10:00
Scorecard

Hyderabad Hawks; 142/5 (20 overs)	v	Sialkot Stallions; 145/2 (19.1 overs)
Rizwan Ahmed 57* (34); Kashif Raza 2/23 (4 overs)		Kamran Younis 65* (56); Farhan Ayub 2/26 (4 overs)

Sialkot Stallions won by 8 wickets
Bagh-e-Jinnah, Lahore
Umpires: Iftikhar Malik and Jamil Kamran
Player of the match: Kamran Younis (Sialkot Stallions)

- Hyderabad Hawks won the toss and elected to bat.
- Naeemuddin (Sialkot Stallions) made his T20 debut.

Group C

4 October
20:30 (D/N)
Scorecard

Peshawar Panthers; 175/7 (20 overs)	v	Islamabad Leopards; 161/9 (20 overs)
Younis Khan 45* (26); Rauf Akbar 3/26 (4 overs)		Naeem Anjum 38 (20); Zohaib Khan 3/38 (4 overs)

Peshawar Panthers won by 14 runs
Gaddafi Stadium, Lahore
Umpires: Akbar Khan and Iftikhar Malik
Player of the match: Younis Khan (Peshawar Panthers)

- Peshawar Panthers won the toss and elected to bat.
- Umair Khan (Islamabad Leopards) and Zohaib Khan (Peshawar Panthers) made their T20 debuts.

5 October
14:00
Scorecard

Peshawar Panthers; 103 (19.3 overs)	v	Multan Tigers; 104/3 (16.5 overs)
Aftab Alam 52 (49); Kamran Hussain 3/10 (4 overs)		Sohaib Maqsood 39 (33); Fazl-e-Akbar 1/14 (4 overs)

Multan Tigers won by 7 wickets
Lahore City Cricket Association Ground
Umpires: Akbar Khan and Islam Khan
Player of the match: Kamran Hussain (Multan Tigers)

- Peshawar Panthers won the toss and elected to bat.
- Gulraiz Sadaf, Hammad Tariq, Mohammad Hafeez and Qaiser Shehzad (Multan Tigers) made their T20 debuts.

6 October
17:00 (D/N)
Scorecard

Multan Tigers; 141/8 (20 overs)	v	Islamabad Leopards; 142/4 (17.2 overs)
Sohaib Maqsood 44 (25); Imad Wasim 2/25 (4 overs)		Ashar Zaidi 42* (18); Kamran Hussain 1/21 (4 overs)

Islamabad Leopards won by 6 wickets
Gaddafi Stadium, Lahore
Umpires: Ahmed Shahab and Mohammad Aslam
Player of the match: Ashar Zaidi (Islamabad Leopards)

- Islamabad Leopards won the toss and elected to field.
- Ashar Zaidi (Islamabad Leopards) made his T20 debut.

Group D

4 October
13:00
Scorecard

Lahore Lions; 187/4 (20 overs)	v	Quetta Bears; 185/4 (20 overs)
Salman Butt 99* (67); Naseer Khan 2/22 (4 overs)		Shoaib Khan 85 (54); Waqas Ahmed 2/28 (3 overs)

Lahore Lions won by 2 runs
Gaddafi Stadium, Lahore
Umpires: Islam Khan and Saleem Badar
Player of the match: Salman Butt (Lahore Lions)

- Lahore Lions won the toss and elected to bat.
- Ahmed Shehzad, Umar Akmal (Lahore Lions); Nazar Hussain and Samiullah Agha (Quetta Bears) made their T20 debuts.

5 October
10:00
Scorecard

Rawalpindi Rams; 142 (20 overs)	v	Quetta Bears; 67 (15.3 overs)
Yasir Arafat 35 (26); Gohar Faiz 3/19 (4 overs)		Arun Lal 19 (21); Yasir Arafat 3/5 (3.3 overs)

Rawalpindi Rams won by 75 runs
Lahore City Cricket Association Ground
Umpires: Rasheed Bhatti and Shozab Raza
Player of the match: Yasir Arafat (Rawalpindi Rams)

- Quetta Bears won the toss and elected to field.
- Awais Zia, Jamal Anwar, Mohammad Amir, Umar Amin and Yasir Ali (Rawalpindi Rams) all made their T20 debuts.

6 October
20:30 (D/N)
Scorecard

Lahore Lions; 171/8 (20 overs)	v	Rawalpindi Rams; 150/7 (20 overs)
Kamran Akmal 49 (37); Mohammad Amir 3/13 (4 overs)		Umar Amin 50 (46); Sohail Ahmed 4/13 (4 overs)

Lahore Lions won by 21 runs
Gaddafi Stadium, Lahore
Umpires: Khalid Mahmood and Riazuddin
Player of the match: Sohail Ahmed (Lahore Lions)

- Lahore Lions won the toss and elected to bat.

=== Knockout stage ===
Semi-finals

7 October
17:00 (D/N)
Scorecard

Islamabad Leopards; 68 (16 overs)	v	Karachi Dolphins; 69/1 (10.4 overs)
Umair Khan 17 (19); Malik Aftab 3/17 (4 overs)		Khurram Manzoor 28* (26); Rauf Akbar 1/12 (3 overs)

Karachi Dolphins won by 9 wickets
Gaddafi Stadium, Lahore
Umpires: Mohammad Aslam and Zameer Haider
Player of the match: Malik Aftab (Karachi Dolphins)

- Islamabad Leopards won the toss and elected to bat.

7 October
21:00 (D/N)
Scorecard

Sialkot Stallions; 117/6 (20 overs)	v	Lahore Lions; 111/6 (20 overs)
Kamran Younis 36 (54); Sohail Ahmed 3/22 (4 overs)		Salman Butt 32 (38); Kamran Younis 2/16 (4 overs)

Sialkot Stallions won by 6 runs
Gaddafi Stadium, Lahore
Umpires: Riazuddin and Saleem Badar
Player of the match: Kamran Younis (Sialkot Stallions)

- Sialkot Stallions won the toss and elected to bat.
- Mohammad Ayub (Sialkot Stallions) made his T20 debut.

Final

8 October
18:00 (D/N)
Scorecard

Karachi Dolphins; 125/9 (20 overs)	v	Sialkot Stallions; 126/3 (19.4 overs)
Fawad Alam 40 (31); Sarfraz Ahmed 2/23 (4 overs)		Mansoor Amjad 39 (35); Shahid Afridi 1/19 (4 overs)

Sialkot Stallions won by 7 wickets
Gaddafi Stadium, Lahore
Umpires: Aleem Dar and Nadeem Ghauri
Player of the match: Shoaib Malik (Sialkot Stallions)

- Karachi Dolphins won the toss and elected to bat.

== Media coverage ==
- Geo Super (live)
