= 2009 National Twenty20 Cup =

Cricket tournament

- Dates: 25 – 29 May 2009
- Administrator: Pakistan Cricket Board
- Cricket format: Twenty20
- Tournament format(s): Round-robin and knockout
- Host: Pakistan
- Champions: Sialkot Stallions (4th title)
- Participants: 13
- Matches: 18

The 2009 RBS Twenty-20 Cup was the fifth edition of the RBS sponsored Twenty-20 Cup in Pakistan. Held in Lahore from 25 to 29 May 2009, the tournament was won by the Sialkot Stallions, who claimed their fourth overall and consecutive title by defeating the Lahore Lions in the final.

This tournament was held immediately before the 2009 ICC World Twenty20, which Pakistan won.

== Results ==
=== Teams and standings ===
The top team from each of the four groups qualified for the semi-finals.

Pool A
Team	Pld	W	L	NR	Pts	NRR
Lahore Lions	3	3	0	0	6	+3.064
Faisalabad Wolves	3	2	1	0	4	+1.407
Rawalpindi Rams	3	1	2	0	2	−0.212
Quetta Bears	3	0	3	0	0	−4.199

Pool B
Team	Pld	W	L	NR	Pts	NRR
Sialkot Stallions	2	2	0	0	4	+4.092
Multan Tigers	2	1	1	0	2	−1.837
Karachi Zebras	2	0	2	0	0	−2.236

Pool C
Team	Pld	W	L	NR	Pts	NRR
Islamabad Leopards	2	2	0	0	4	+0.922
Hyderabad Hawks	2	1	1	0	2	−0.202
Peshawar Panthers	2	0	2	0	0	−0.764

Pool D
Team	Pld	W	L	NR	Pts	NRR
Lahore Eagles	2	2	0	0	4	+0.414
Karachi Dolphins	2	1	1	0	2	+1.025
Abbottabad Rhinos	2	0	2	0	0	−1.448

Qualified for semi-finals

=== Knockout stage ===
Semifinals
A1	Lahore Lions	125/7
C1	Islamabad Leopards	123/7
B1	Sialkot Stallions	181
D1	Lahore Eagles	126

Final
A1	Lahore Lions	150/8
B1	Sialkot Stallions	151/6

== Fixtures ==
=== Group stage ===
Group A

25 May
09:00
Scorecard

Faisalabad Wolves; 218/2 (20 overs)	v	Quetta Bears; 117/8 (20 overs)
Qaiser Iqbal 80 (56); Shoaib Khan 1/24 (2 overs)		Shoaib Khan 55 (36); Mohammad Hafeez 3/5 (4 overs)

Faisalabad Wolves won by 101 runs
Lahore City Cricket Association Ground
Umpires: Islam Khan and Kaukab Butt
Player of the match: Mohammad Hafeez (Faisalabad Wolves)

- Quetta Bears won the toss and elected to field.
- Ali Raza, Kamran Naeem, Qaiser Iqbal, Zeeshan Butt (Faisalabad Wolves); Abdullah Jan, Bismillah Khan, Farhan Khan, Irfan Ismail, Khalil Ahmed and Taimur Ali (Quetta Bears) all made their T20 debuts.

25 May
17:30 (D/N)
Scorecard

Rawalpindi Rams; 135/9 (20 overs)	v	Lahore Lions; 136/2 (14.5 overs)
Awais Zia 43 (35); Jahangir Mirza 2/16 (4 overs)		Umar Akmal 39* (20); Faisal Iqbal 1/22 (3 overs)

Lahore Lions won by 8 wickets
Gaddafi Stadium, Lahore
Umpires: Iftikhar Malik and Rasheed Bhatti
Player of the match: Umar Akmal (Lahore Lions)

- Lahore Lions won the toss and elected to field.
- Faisal Iqbal, Mohammad Rameez and Qamar Abbas (Rawalpindi Rams) made their T20 debuts.

26 May
16:00
Scorecard

Faisalabad Wolves; 170/4 (20 overs)	v	Rawalpindi Rams; 143/7 (20 overs)
Mohammad Hafeez 79* (56); Sohail Tanvir 3/24 (4 overs)		Naved Malik 50 (27); Mohammad Hafeez 3/14 (4 overs)

Faisalabad Wolves won by 27 runs
Lahore City Cricket Association Ground
Umpires: Akram Raza and Jamil Kamran
Player of the match: Mohammad Hafeez (Faisalabad Wolves)

- Rawalpindi Rams won the toss and elected to field.

26 May
21:00 (D/N)
Scorecard

Lahore Lions; 214/6 (20 overs)	v	Quetta Bears; 140/9 (20 overs)
Abdul Razzaq 109 (51); Khalil Ahmed 3/31 (4 overs)		Taimur Ali 42 (34); Mohammad Naved 2/15 (3 overs)

Lahore Lions won by 74 runs
Gaddafi Stadium, Lahore
Umpires: Saleem Badar and Shozab Raza
Player of the match: Abdul Razzaq (Lahore Lions)

- Quetta Bears won the toss and elected to field.
- Fareeduddin and Mohammad Ali (Quetta Bears) made their T20 debuts.

27 May
09:00
Scorecard

Quetta Bears; 127/7 (20 overs)	v	Rawalpindi Rams; 128/1 (12.5 overs)
Taimur Ali 38 (44); Mohammad Amir 3/20 (4 overs)		Naved Malik 73* (37); Khalil Ahmed 1/32 (2 overs)

Rawalpindi Rams won by 9 wickets
Lahore City Cricket Association Ground
Umpires: Iqbal Butt and Shakeel Khan

- Quetta Bears won the toss and elected to bat.
- Faizullah, Maqbool Umaid (Quetta Bears); Fawad Hussain and Usama Shahroon (Rawalpindi Rams) made their T20 debuts.

27 May
17:30 (D/N)
Scorecard

Faisalabad Wolves; 124/8 (20 overs)	v	Lahore Lions; 126/5 (14.1 overs)
Naved Latif 41 (23); Abdul Razzaq 4/13 (4 overs)		Umar Akmal 44 (33); Mohammad Talha 3/26 (4 overs)

Lahore Lions won by 5 wickets
Gaddafi Stadium, Lahore
Umpires: Saleem Badar and Zameer Haider
Player of the match: Abdul Razzaq (Lahore Lions)

- Faisalabad Wolves won the toss and elected to bat.

Group B

25 May
14:00
Scorecard

Karachi Zebras; 133 (19.4 overs)	v	Sialkot Stallions; 137/2 (12.5 overs)
Fahad Iqbal 32 (26); Shoaib Malik 3/25 (4 overs)		Imran Nazir 68* (38); Akbar-ur-Rehman 1/28 (3.5 overs)

Sialkot Stallions won by 8 wickets
Gaddafi Stadium, Lahore
Umpires: Akram Raza and Tahir Shah
Player of the match: Imran Nazir (Sialkot Stallions)

- Sialkot Stallions won the toss and elected to field.
- Akbar-ur-Rehman, Javed Mansoor, Uzair-ul-Haq (Karachi Zebras); Kashif Daud and Naved Arif (Sialkot Stallions) all made their T20 debuts.

26 May
09:00
Scorecard

Karachi Zebras; 158/6 (20 overs)	v	Multan Tigers; 161/2 (18.3 overs)
Fahad Iqbal 58* (41); Kashif Naved 3/20 (3 overs)		Sohaib Maqsood 59 (40); Faraz Ahmed 1/25 (3.3 overs)

Multan Tigers won by 8 wickets
Lahore City Cricket Association Ground
Umpires: Akbar Khan and Iqbal Butt
Player of the match: Babar Ali (Multan Tigers)

- Multan Tigers won the toss and elected to field.
- Sheharyar Ghani (Karachi Zebras); Ali Moazzam, Babar Ali, Rameez Alam and Rizwan Haider (Multan Tigers) all made their T20 debuts.

27 May
21:00 (D/N)
Scorecard

Sialkot Stallions; 196/4 (20 overs)	v	Multan Tigers; 109 (19.5 overs)
Shoaib Malik 62* (37); Kashif Naved 2/20 (2 overs)		Rizwan Haider 27 (31); Kashif Daud 3/16 (3 overs)

Sialkot Stallions won by 87 runs
Gaddafi Stadium, Lahore
Umpires: Ehtesham-ul-Haq and Riazuddin
Player of the match: Shoaib Malik (Sialkot Stallions)

- Multan Tigers won the toss and elected to field.
- Ahmed Raza and Ansar Javed (Multan Tigers) both made their T20 debuts.

Group C

25 May
21:00 (D/N)
Scorecard

Peshawar Panthers; 152/4 (20 overs)	v	Islamabad Leopards; 153/4 (17.4 overs)
Younis Khan 70 (46); Saad Altaf 2/22 (4 overs)		Fayyaz Ahmed 58* (46); Younis Khan 1/2 (1 over)

Islamabad Leopards won by 6 wickets
Gaddafi Stadium, Lahore
Umpires: Saleem Badar and Zameer Haider
Player of the match: Fayyaz Ahmed (Islamabad Leopards)

- Peshawar Panthers won the toss and elected to bat.
- Faizan Riaz, Kamran Hussain (Islamabad Leopards); Fawad Ali, Mahfooz Sabri and Sajjad Ahmed (Peshawar Panthers) all made their T20 debuts.

26 May
14:00
Scorecard

Peshawar Panthers; 148/6 (20 overs)	v	Hyderabad Hawks; 150/2 (19 overs)
Younis Khan 38 (28); Nauman Ali 1/22 (4 overs)		Faisal Athar 55* (37); Mahfooz Sabri 2/32 (4 overs)

Hyderabad Hawks won by 8 wickets
Gaddafi Stadium, Lahore
Umpires: Ghaffar Kazmi and Rasheed Bhatti
Player of the match: Faisal Athar (Hyderabad Hawks)

- Hyderabad Hawks won the toss and elected to field.
- Ayaz Jamali, Azeem Ghumman, Ghulam Yasin, Mohammad Urs (Hyderabad Hawks); Imran Khan, Mohammad Rizwan and Nawaz Ahmed (Peshawar Panthers) all made their T20 debuts.

27 May
16:00
Scorecard

Hyderabad Hawks; 117 (19.5 overs)	v	Islamabad Leopards; 121/4 (18.1 overs)
Faisal Athar 28 (29); Saad Altaf 3/12 (3.5 overs)		Afaq Raheem 60* (51); Kashif Bhatti 2/19 (4 overs)

Islamabad Leopards won by 6 wickets
Lahore City Cricket Association Ground
Umpires: Anis Siddiqi and Ijaz Ahmed

- Islamabad Leopards won the toss and elected to field.
- Kashif Bhatti (Hyderabad Hawks) and Shehzad Azam (Islamabad Leopards) both made their T20 debuts.

Group D

25 May
16:00
Scorecard

Abbottabad Rhinos; 137 (20 overs)	v	Lahore Eagles; 140/3 (19.4 overs)
Adnan Raees 35 (25); Azhar Ali 2/21 (4 overs)		Abid Ali 42 (39); Yasir Shah 2/16 (4 overs)

Lahore Eagles won by 7 wickets
Lahore City Cricket Association Ground
Umpires: Khalid Mahmood and Zaheer Ahmed
Player of the match: Azhar Ali (Lahore Eagles)

- Abbottabad Rhinos won the toss and elected to bat.
- Inam Khan, Mir Azam (Abbottabad Rhinos) and Ahmed Dar (Lahore Eagles) all made their T20 debuts.

26 May
17:30 (D/N)
Scorecard

Karachi Dolphins; 209/5 (20 overs)	v	Abbottabad Rhinos; 157/7 (20 overs)
Khalid Latif 81 (50); Haris Bilal 1/25 (3 overs)		Adnan Raees 42 (33); Mohammad Sami 2/23 (3 overs)

Karachi Dolphins won by 52 runs
Gaddafi Stadium, Lahore
Umpires: Iftikhar Malik and Shakeel Khan
Player of the match: Khalid Latif (Karachi Dolphins)

- Karachi Dolphins won the toss and elected to bat.
- Haris Bilal and Rashid Nawaz (Abbottabad Rhinos) both made their T20 debuts.

27 May
14:00
Scorecard

Lahore Eagles; 167/9 (20 overs)	v	Karachi Dolphins; 156/8 (20 overs)
Khaqan Arsal 56 (30); Azam Hussain 2/33 (4 overs)		Fawad Alam 51 (36); Usman Malik 2/19 (4 overs)

Lahore Eagles won by 11 runs
Gaddafi Stadium, Lahore
Umpires: Ahmed Shahab and Nadeem Ghauri
Player of the match: Khaqan Arsal (Lahore Eagles)

- Karachi Dolphins won the toss and elected to field.

=== Knockout stage ===
Semi-finals

28 May
17:30 (D/N)
Scorecard

Islamabad Leopards; 123/7 (20 overs)	v	Lahore Lions; 125/7 (19.3 overs)
Naeem Anjum 37 (29); Mohammad Naved 2/15 (4 overs)		Imran Farhat 33 (27); Saad Altaf 2/19 (3.3 overs)

Lahore Lions won by 3 wickets
Gaddafi Stadium, Lahore
Umpires: Anis-ur-Rehman and Shakeel Khan
Player of the match: Kamran Akmal (Lahore Lions)

- Lahore Lions won the toss and elected to field.

28 May
21:00 (D/N)
Scorecard

Sialkot Stallions; 181 (19.5 overs)	v	Lahore Eagles; 126 (19.2 overs)
Shoaib Malik 45 (27); Junaid Zia 3/28 (4 overs)		Fahad Masood 39 (26); Naved Arif 2/13 (4 overs)

Sialkot Stallions won by 55 runs
Gaddafi Stadium, Lahore
Umpires: Akram Raza and Riazuddin
Player of the match: Shoaib Malik (Sialkot Stallions)

- Lahore Eagles won the toss and elected to field.

Final

29 May
20:00 (D/N)
Scorecard

Lahore Lions; 150/8 (20 overs)	v	Sialkot Stallions; 151/6 (19.1 overs)
Imran Farhat 47 (27); Abdur Rehman 2/21 (4 overs)		Imran Nazir 57 (26); Abdul Razzaq 2/37 (4 overs)

Sialkot Stallions won by 4 wickets
Gaddafi Stadium, Lahore
Umpires: Nadeem Ghauri and Zameer Haider
Player of the match: Imran Nazir (Sialkot Stallions)

- Lahore Lions won the toss and elected to bat.
- Shahbaz Butt (Lahore Lions) made his T20 debut.

== Media coverage ==
- Geo Super (live)
