= List of Sheikhupura cricketers =

This is a list of cricketers who played first-class or List A matches for Sheikhupura cricket team in Pakistan.

- Aaqib Javed
- Abdul Haseeb
- Ahmed Saleem
- Ahsan Virk
- Ali Raza
- Asif Raza
- Faisal Rasheed
- Faisal Virk
- Farrukh Majeed
- Humayun Ali
- Humayun Shaukat
- Imran Nazir
- Irfan Ashraf
- Irfan Imtiaz
- Jaffar Nazir
- Javed Hussain
- Kaleem Imran
- Kaleemullah
- Kashif Imran
- Kashif Raza
- Khalil Ahmed
- Majid Majeed
- Maqsood Raza
- Mohammad Arslan
- Mohammad Asif
- Mohammad Ayub
- Mohammad Azam
- Mohammad Haroon
- Mohammad Hasan
- Mohammad Ishaq
- Mohammad Islam
- Mohammad Javed
- Mohammad Naeem
- Mohammad Sarwar
- Mohammad Shafiq
- Mohammad Shehbaz
- Mohammad Usman
- Mohammad Yasin
- Mubarak Ali
- Mujahid Jamshed
- Mumtaz Ali
- Mushtaq Nazir
- Nadeem Iqbal
- Nadeem Javed
- Nadeem Karamat
- Nasim Abbas
- Naved-ul-Hasan
- Nawaz Sardar
- Qaiser Abbas
- Qamar Abbas
- Rashid Khan
- Sajjad Ali
- Sajjad Khan
- Saleem Mughal
- Sarfraz Kazmi
- Shahid Naseer
- Shakeel Ahmed
- Sohail Shehzad
- Tahir Amin
- Tahir Usman
- Umar Saleem
- Usman Akram
- Usman Azam
- Waqar Khan
- Waqas Chughtai
- Yasir Bashir
- Zahid Javed
- Zakaullah Khan
- Zubair Watto
