= List of Sialkot cricketers =

This is a list of cricketers who have played matches for the Sialkot cricket team, from the city of Sialkot in Punjab, Pakistan.

- Mohammad Abbas
- Nayyer Abbas
- Qaiser Abbas
- Ijaz Ahmed
- Hasan Ali
- Mohammad Ali
- Mansoor Amjad
- Shakeel Ansar
- Jamal Anwar
- Shaiman Anwar
- Naved Arif
- Bilal Asif
- Mohammad Asif
- Umaid Asif
- Mohammad Ayub
- Bilawal Bhatti
- Amad Butt
- Kashif Daud
- Bilal Hussain
- Mohammad Imran
- Inam-ul-Haq
- Majeed Jahangir
- Ali Khan
- Tahir Mahmood
- Shehzad Malik
- Shoaib Malik
- Tahir Mughal
- Usman Mushtaq
- Naeemuddin
- Naved-ul-Hasan
- Faisal Naved
- Imran Nazir
- Jaffar Nazir
- Kashif Raza
- Abdur Rehman
- Basit Saeed
- Zahid Saeed
- Naved Sarwar
- Obaidullah Sarwar
- Haris Sohail
- Imran Tahir
- Aamer Wasim
- Kamran Younis
- Shahid Yousuf
