= Basharat =

Basharat may refer to:

== Places ==
- Başarat, Azerbaijan
- Basharat, Chakwal, Pakistan
- Basharat Mosque, in Pedro Abad, Spain

== People ==
- Basharat Peer (born 1977), Indian writer
- Basharat Hassan (born 1944), Kenyan cricketer
- Shahab Basharat (born 1987), Pakistani cricketer
- Basharat Ahmad (1876–1943), member of the Lahore Ahmadiyya Movement
