= English cricket team in Pakistan in 2000–01 =

England in Pakistan in 2000–01
	England	Pakistan
- Dates: 20 October – 11 December 2000
Captains	Nasser Hussain	Moin Khan

Test series
- Result: England won the 3-match series 1–0
Most runs	Michael Atherton (341)	Yousuf Youhana (342)
Most wickets	Ashley Giles (17)	Saqlain Mushtaq (18)
- Player of the series: Yousuf Youhana (Pak)

One Day International series
- Results: Pakistan won the 3-match series 2–1
Most runs	Nasser Hussain (128)	Inzamam-ul-Haq (131)
Most wickets	Ashley Giles (3)	Saqlain Mushtaq (7)

The England cricket team toured Pakistan from 20 October to 11 December 2000 for a three-match One Day International series and a three-match Test series. England toured Pakistan after a gap of 13 years.

Pakistan won the ODI series 2–1 after losing the first ODI, while England won the Test series 1–0 after the first two Tests finished in draws. It was England's first Test victory against Pakistan in Pakistan since they toured in 1961–62.

It was England's first series victory in Pakistan for 39 years, and the first defeat in 35 Tests in Karachi for Pakistan.

== Squads ==
Tests		ODIs	
Pakistan	England	Pakistan	England
Moin Khan (c & wk); Inzamam-ul-Haq (vc); Abdul Razzaq; Arshad Khan; Danish Kaneria; Imran Nazir; Mushtaq Ahmed; Qaiser Abbas; Saeed Anwar; Saleem Elahi; Saqlain Mushtaq; Shahid Afridi; Waqar Younis; Wasim Akram; Yousuf Youhana	Nasser Hussain (c); Michael Atherton; Andy Caddick; Dominic Cork; Ashley Giles; Darren Gough; Graeme Hick; Matthew Hoggard; Paul Nixon (wk); Ian Salisbury; Alec Stewart (wk); Graham Thorpe; Marcus Trescothick; Alex Tudor; Michael Vaughan; Craig White	Moin Khan (c & wk); Inzamam-ul-Haq (vc); Abdul Razzaq; Azhar Mahmood; Faisal Iqbal; Imran Nazir; Mushtaq Ahmed; Saeed Anwar; Saleem Elahi; Saqlain Mushtaq; Shahid Afridi; Shoaib Malik; Waqar Younis; Wasim Akram; Yousuf Youhana	Nasser Hussain (c); Mark Alleyne; Andy Caddick; Dominic Cork; Mark Ealham; Andrew Flintoff; Ashley Giles; Darren Gough; Paul Grayson; Graeme Hick; Matthew Hoggard; Vikram Solanki; Alec Stewart (wk); Graham Thorpe; Marcus Trescothick; Craig White

== Tour matches ==
=== 50-over: Sind Governor's XI vs England XI ===
20 October 2000 (D/N)
Scorecard

England XI; 323/7 (50 overs)	v	Sind Governor's XI; 242 (46.4 overs)
Marcus Trescothick 102 (93); Shoaib Malik 3/59 (10 overs)		Saleem Elahi 120 (103); Darren Gough 5/32 (8.4 overs)

England XI won by 81 runs
National Stadium, Karachi
Umpires: Afzaal Ahmed (Pak) and Shakeel Khan (Pak)

- England XI won the toss and elected to bat.

=== 50-over: Pakistan A vs England XI ===
22 October 2000 (D/N)
Scorecard

Pakistan A 169/7 (50 overs)	v	England XI; 170/0 (29.4 overs)
Naumanullah 64 (88); Andy Caddick 3/15 (10 overs)		Marcus Trescothick 59* (55)

England XI won by 10 wickets
National Stadium, Karachi
Umpires: Feroze Butt (Pak) and Islam Khan (Pak)

- England XI won the toss and elected to field.

=== First-class: Pakistan Cricket Board Patron's XI vs England XI ===
1–4 November 2000
Scorecard

Pakistan Cricket Board Patron's XI	v	England XI
237 (102.1 overs); Qaiser Abbas 71 (140); Matthew Hoggard 5/62 (27 overs)		433 (120.5 overs); Craig White 120 (188); Mohammad Akram 4/105 (23.5 overs)
169 (65.3 overs); Qaiser Abbas 44 (81); Matthew Hoggard 4/40 (18 overs)

England XI won by an innings and 27 runs
Rawalpindi Cricket Stadium, Rawalpindi
Umpires: Kamal Merchant (Pak) and Zafar Iqbal (Pak)

- Pakistan Cricket Board Patron's XI won the toss and elected to bat.

=== First-class: North West Frontier Province Governor's XI vs England XI ===
8–11 November 2000
Scorecard

North West Frontier Province Governor's XI	v	England XI
224 (72.5 overs); Mohammad Hussain 65 (92); Darren Gough 3/54 (23 overs)		315 (107.5 overs); Marcus Trescothick 93 (162); Kashif Raza 3/66 (21 overs)
170 (60.5 overs); Akhtar Sarfraz 53 (127); Darren Gough 3/51 (15 overs)		80/2 (17.2 overs); Nasser Hussain 23* (28); Kashif Raza 2/38 (9 overs)

England XI won by 8 wickets
Arbab Niaz Stadium, Peshawar
Umpires: Iqbal Butt (Pak) and Sajjad Asghar (Pak)

- England XI won the toss and elected to field.

=== First-class: Pakistan Cricket Board XI vs England XI ===
23–25 November 2000
Scorecard

Pakistan Cricket Board XI	v	England XI
117 (42.3 overs); Shoaib Malik 27 (35); Matthew Hoggard 4/13 (11.3 overs)		237/7d (61.4 overs); Marcus Trescothick 50* (126); Stephen John 4/73 (21 overs)
71/6 (29 overs); Faisal Iqbal 27* (70); Matthew Hoggard 4/17 (11 overs)

Match drawn
Bagh-e-Jinnah, Lahore
Umpires: Asad Rauf (Pak) and Ehtesham-ul-Haq (Pak)

- England XI won the toss and elected to field.

== ODI series ==
=== 1st ODI ===
24 October 2000 (D/N)
Scorecard

Pakistan; 304/9 (50 overs)	v	England; 306/5 (47.2 overs)
Abdul Razzaq 75* (40); Mark Ealham 2/49 (10 overs)		Andrew Flintoff 84 (60); Abdul Razzaq 2/71 (10 overs)

England won by 5 wickets
National Stadium, Karachi
Umpires: Riazuddin (Pak) and Saleem Badar (Pak)
Player of the match: Andrew Flintoff (Eng)

- Pakistan won the toss and elected to bat.

=== 2nd ODI ===
27 October 2000 (D/N)
Scorecard

England; 211/9 (50 overs)	v	Pakistan; 214/2 (44.2 overs)
Marcus Trescothick 65 (74); Shahid Afridi 5/40 (10 overs)		Shahid Afridi 61 (69); Ashley Giles 2/45 (10 overs)

Pakistan won by 8 wickets
Gaddafi Stadium, Lahore
Umpires: Aleem Dar (Pak) and Mohammad Nazir (Pak)
Player of the match: Shahid Afridi (Pak)

- Pakistan won the toss and elected to field.

=== 3rd ODI ===
30 October 2000 (D/N)
Scorecard

England; 158 (42.5 overs)	v	Pakistan; 161/4 (43.3 overs)
Graham Thorpe 39 (71); Saqlain Mushtaq 5/20 (8 overs)		Inzamam-ul-Haq 60* (108); Andy Caddick 2/46 (9 overs)

Pakistan won by 6 wickets
Rawalpindi Cricket Stadium, Rawalpindi
Umpires: Mian Mohammad Aslam (Pak) and Zafar Iqbal (Pak)
Player of the match: Saqlain Mushtaq (Pak)

- Pakistan won the toss and elected to field.

== Test series ==
=== 1st Test ===
15–19 November 2000
Scorecard

England	v	Pakistan
480/8d (196 overs); Graham Thorpe 118 (301); Saqlain Mushtaq 8/164 (74 overs)		401 (163.3 overs); Yousuf Youhana 124 (308); Craig White 4/54 (24.3 overs)
77/4d (32.1 overs); Alec Stewart 27* (53); Wasim Akram 1/1 (6 overs)

Match drawn
Gaddafi Stadium, Lahore
Umpires: Darrell Hair (Aus) and Riazuddin (Pak)
Player of the match: Saqlain Mushtaq (Pak)

- England won the toss and elected to bat.
- Qaiser Abbas (Pak) made his Test debut.

=== 2nd Test ===
29 November – 3 December 2000
Scorecard

Pakistan	v	England
316 (108.1 overs); Yousuf Youhana 77 (227); Ashley Giles 5/75 (35 overs)		342 (136.4 overs); Graham Thorpe 79 (246); Saqlain Mushtaq 3/62 (30.4 overs)
269/3d (80.2 overs); Abdul Razzaq 100* (225); Ian Salisbury 1/32 (7 overs)		125/5 (57 overs); Michael Atherton 65* (178); Shahid Afridi 2/21 (12 overs)

Match drawn
Iqbal Stadium, Faisalabad
Umpires: Steve Bucknor (WI) and Mian Mohammad Aslam (Pak)
Player of the match: Abdul Razzaq (Pak)

- Pakistan won the toss and elected to bat.
- Danish Kaneria (Pak) made his Test debut.

=== 3rd Test ===
7–11 December 2000
Scorecard

Pakistan	v	England
405 (139.4 overs); Inzamam-ul-Haq 142 (257); Ashley Giles 4/94 (35 overs)		388 (179.1 overs); Michael Atherton 125 (430); Waqar Younis 4/88 (36 overs)
158 (70 overs); Saleem Elahi 37 (136); Darren Gough 3/30 (13 overs)		176/4 (41.3 overs); Graham Thorpe 64* (98); Saqlain Mushtaq 3/64 (17.3 overs)

England won by 6 wickets
National Stadium, Karachi
Umpires: Steve Bucknor (WI) and Mohammad Nazir (Pak)
Player of the match: Michael Atherton (Eng)

- Pakistan won the toss and elected to bat.
