= Sheikhupura cricket team =

Cricket team

Sheikhupura cricket team, from the city of Sheikhupura in Sheikhupura District in the north-east of Punjab province in Pakistan, played first-class cricket in the Quaid-e-Azam Trophy for three seasons from 2000–01 to 2002–03.

== Playing record ==
In the 2000–01 season, Sheikhupura won only one of their eleven matches and were due to be relegated to non-first-class status for 2001–02, but an expansion in the number of teams in the Quaid-e-Azam Trophy allowed their retention. In 2001–02 they won five of their eight matches and finished second in their group. However, several of their leading players left after the season, and in 2002–03 Sheikhupura won none of their five matches.

Overall, Sheikhupura played 24 first-class matches, with six wins, nine losses and nine draws.

== Current status ==
Sheikhupura was one of six regional teams absorbed by stronger teams for the 2003–04 season. Along with Gujranwala, they merged with the neighbouring Sialkot team. Over the next six seasons Sialkot won the Quaid-i-Azam Trophy twice and finished second twice.

Sheikhupura continue to play at sub-first-class level. Currently they take part in the Inter-District Senior Tournament, a three-day national competition, playing other teams from the Sialkot region.

== Leading players ==
Naved-ul-Hasan took 90 wickets at an average of 21.91 and made 776 runs at 29.84 for Sheikhupura in 2000–01 and 2001–02 before joining Water and Power Development Authority in 2002–03. His fellow opening bowler Jaffar Nazir took 96 wickets at 19.44 before joining Khan Research Laboratories in 2002–03. Qaiser Abbas also left after the 2001–02 season to play for National Bank of Pakistan. Saleem Mughal played in all three seasons, scoring more runs than any other Sheikhupura player: 866 at an average of 36.08.

== Individual records ==
Sheikhupura's highest individual score was 146 not out by Saleem Mughal against Lahore Whites in 2002–03. The best innings bowling figures were 7 for 46 by Jaffar Nazir against Bahawalpur in 2000–01. The best match figures were 11 for 77 (4 for 28 and 7 for 49) by Naved-ul-Hasan against Sialkot in 2001–02.

== List A cricket ==
Sheikhupura had more success in List A cricket, winning their first six matches in 2000–01 before losing the final. However, they won only one game in each of the next two seasons and dropped out of the top level of competition in 2003–04.

== Grounds ==
Sheikhupura's home matches have always been played at Sheikhupura Stadium, where Pakistan played two Test matches in the 1990s.

== Notable cricketers ==
- Qaiser Abbas
- Mohammad Asif
- Mohammad Ayub
- Mohammad Haroon
- Mujahid Jamshed
- Aaqib Javed
- Saleem Mughal
- Naved-ul-Hasan
- Imran Nazir
- Jaffar Nazir
- Kashif Raza
- Maqsood Raza

== Other sources ==
- Wisden Cricketers' Almanack 2002 to 2004
