= Qaiser =

Qaiser (Urdu: قیصر) is a given name and surname of Arabic origin. Notable people with the name include:

== Given name ==
- Qaiser Abbas (born 1982), Pakistani cricketer
- Qaiser Ali (born 1983), Canadian cricket player
- Rao Qaiser Ali Khan, Pakistani politician
- Qaiser Ashraf (born 1994), Pakistani cricketer
- Qaiser Hussain (born 1959), Pakistani former cricketer
- Qaiser Khan (born 1971), Indian politician
- Qaiser Mushtaq (born 1954), Pakistani mathematician and academic
- Qaiser Naqvi (born 1958), Pakistani actress
- Qaiser Rashid Khan (1961–2024), Pakistani jurist
- Qaiser Shehzad (born 1986), Pakistani cricketer
- Qaiser Ahmed Sheikh (born 1946), Pakistani politician
- Qaiser Waheed (born 1966), Pakistani former cricketer

== Family name ==
- Asad Qaiser (born 1969), Pakistani politician
- Azhar Shah Qaiser (1920–1985), Indian Islamic scholar, journalist and writer
- Ejaz Qaiser (1952–2020), Pakistani singer
- Farooq Qaiser (1945–2021), Pakistani artist, newspaper columnist, TV show director, puppeteer, script writer, and voice actor
- Iqbal Qaiser (born 1999), Pakistani Punjabi writer, historian and cultural activist
- Jamal A. Qaiser (born 1972), Pakistani-German international award-winning author, businessman and political advisor
- Khalil Qaiser (1930–1966), Pakistani film director, producer and screenwriter
- Sohail Qaiser (1965–2016), Pakistani squash player
- Zain Qaiser, British student
