= 2005–06 Quaid-e-Azam Trophy =

Cricket tournament

- Dates: 16 October 2005 – 8 December 2005
- Administrator: Pakistan Cricket Board
- Cricket format: First-class
- Tournament format(s): Two division league; round-robin and finals
- Host: Pakistan
- Champions: Sialkot (1st title)
- Participants: 13
- Matches: 22 (Gold), 16 (Silver)
- Most runs: Saeed Anwar (574)
- Most wickets: Samiullah Khan (40)
- Official website: www.pcb.com.pk

The 2005–06 Quaid-e-Azam Trophy was one of three first-class domestic cricket competitions that were held in Pakistan during the 2005–06 season. The Quaid-e-Azam Trophy was contested by thirteen teams representing regional associations; (Note: The top level of domestic cricket in Pakistan was historically played by teams representing regional cricket associations and departments, which were owned and run by corporations, institutions or government departments.) it was followed in the schedule by the Patron's Trophy Grade-I, contested by ten departmental teams, and the revived Pentangular Trophy, involving the top teams from each competition, later in the season.

There were significant changes from the previous season as the Pakistan Cricket Board reorganised the competition into two divisions, with seven teams in the top "Gold League" and six teams in the second "Silver League"; matches in both leagues were accorded first-class status. Each division was played in a round-robin of 4-day matches, with a final played over 5 days between the top two teams to determine the winner. The winner of the Gold League final received the Quaid-e-Azam Trophy, and the winner of the Silver League final gained promotion to the Gold league for the following season, with the last placed team in the Gold League being relegated to the Silver League.

Sialkot won the Quaid-e-Azam Trophy for the first time, after they beat Faisalabad by an innings and 44 runs in the Gold League final. Karachi Harbour won the Silver League final to earn promotion, and Multan were relegated from the top division.

== Group stage ==
The top two teams in the round-robin group stage (highlighted) advanced to the finals.

Gold League
Team	Pld	W	L	D	A	Pts
Faisalabad	6	5	1	0	0	42
Sialkot (C)	6	4	1	1	0	36
Rawalpindi	6	3	2	1	0	27
Lahore Shalimar	6	2	4	0	0	18
Peshawar	6	1	3	2	0	15
Karachi Urban	6	1	3	2	0	12
Multan (R)	6	1	3	2	0	9

Silver League
Team	Pld	W	L	D	A	Pts
Karachi Harbour (P)	5	4	1	0	0	36
Hyderabad	5	3	1	1	0	27
Lahore Ravi	5	2	1	2	0	24
Quetta	5	1	2	2	0	9
Islamabad	5	1	2	2	0	9
Abbottabad	5	0	4	1	0	3

Position determined by total points, most matches won, fewest matches lost, followed by adjusted net run rate (matches with no result, i.e. those where both teams did not complete their first innings, were disregarded); matches finishing in a draw were decided on first innings scores, with points awarded as follows:
- Win = 9 points
- Win having trailed on first innings = 6 points
- Draw having led on first innings = 3 points
- Loss, draw having trailed on first innings, or draw with no result based on the first innings = 0 points

== Finals ==
=== Silver League final ===
27–29 November 2005
Scorecard

Hyderabad	v	Karachi Harbour
72 (23.1 overs); Shoaib Laghari 23 (22); Malik Aftab 5/34 (11.1 overs)		602/8 dec. (145.4 overs); Moin Khan 200* (211); Kashif Raza 4/94 (30 overs)
325 (71.2 overs); Shahid Qambrani 104* (152); Fawad Alam 4/27 (10.2 overs)

Karachi Harbour won by an innings and 205 runs
Niaz Stadium, Hyderabad
Umpires: Iqbal Butt and ZI Pasha

- Karachi Harbour won the toss and elected to field.

=== Gold League final ===
4–6 December 2005
Scorecard

Faisalabad	v	Sialkot
111 (33.3 overs); Imran Ali 44 (78); Sarfraz Ahmed 6/28 (16.3 overs)		343 (92.5 overs); Shahid Yousuf 117 (170); Samiullah Khan 6/112 (30.5 overs)
188 (57 overs); Mohammad Hafeez 59 (120); Zahid Saeed 4/49 (16 overs)

Sialkot won by an innings and 44 runs
Gaddafi Stadium, Lahore
Umpires: Asad Rauf and Saleem Badar

- Sialkot won the toss and elected to field.
