= Samiullah =

Samiullah (Arabic: سمیع اللہ, romanized: Samī’ Allāh) is an Arabic male given name, meaning "listening to God" or "listener of God". It comes from the Arabic as-Samī’ (ٱلْسَّمِيعُ, "The All-Hearing"), one of the 99 Names of God.

The name is also spelled Samiollah, Samiulla, Semiulla.

Notable people with the name include:

- Samiullah (Afghan cricketer) (born 2003), Afghan cricketer
- Samiullah (Pakistani cricketer) (born 1996), Pakistani cricketer
- Samiullah Agha (born 1981), Pakistani cricketer
- Samiullah Beigh (born 1981), Indian cricketer
- Samiullah Ihsas (born 1997), Afghan cricketer
- Samiullah Jalatzai, Afghan detained in Bagram
- Samiulla Khan (1899–1967), Indian politician from Madhya Pradesh
- Samiullah Khan, governor of the state of Sahaspur in pre-partition India
- Samiullah Khan (cricketer), in full Samiullah Khan Niazi (born 1982), Pakistani cricketer
- Samiullah Khan (field hockey) (born 1951), Pakistani hockey player
- Sami Ullah Khan (born 1960), Pakistani politician
- Samiollah Hosseini Makarem, Iranian politician
- Samiullah Mehsud (born 1998), Pakistani cricketer
- Samiullah Shinwari (born 1987), Afghan cricketer
- Semiulla Wafin (1909–1983), Finnish Tatar businessman, cultural figure
