= Waseem Bhatti =

French cricketer of Pakistani origin

Personal information
- Full name: Waseem Ahmed Bhatti
- Born: 10 March 1978 (age 48); Sialkot, Punjab, Pakistan
- Batting: Right-handed
- Role: Wicket-keeper

International information
- National side: France (2004–2015)

Domestic team information
- Years: Team
- 1998–1999: Pakistan International Airlines

Career statistics
| Competition | First-class |
|---|---|
| Matches | 4 |
| Runs scored | 42 |
| Batting average | 14.00 |
| 100s/50s | 0/0 |
| Top score | 22 |
| Catches/stumpings | 9/3 |
- Source: CricketArchive (1); CricketArchive (2), 25 April 2015

Waseem Ahmed Bhatti (also spelled Wasim; born 10 March 1978) is a Pakistani cricketer who has played cricket for the French national team. Before emigrating to France, he played two seasons of senior Pakistani domestic cricket for Pakistan International Airlines (PIA). A wicket-keeper, he has played regularly for the French national side since 2004, and captained the team for several years.

Born in Sialkot, Bhatti first played at high levels during the 1997–98 season, when he turned out for Sibi District in the Grade-II Quaid-i-Azam Trophy. He made his first-class debut the following season, playing three Patron's Trophy matches for PIA in late 1998. On debut against Pakistan Customs he made what was to be his highest first-class score, 22 runs from 64 balls coming in ninth in the batting order. His maiden first-class dismissal was a stumping off the bowling of Shoaib Malik, a future Pakistani international. Bhatti played only a single game for PIA during the 1999–2000 season, a Quaid-i-Azam Trophy fixture against Gujranwala. Although he took a catch and two stumpings in that match, Ahmed Zeeshan and Javed Qadeer were preferred as keeper for the rest of the season.

Only 21 by the end of his last season in Pakistan, Bhatti reputedly "turned up in Paris in 2000 after failing to get a visa to play in England". His first recorded matches for the French national side came in Belgium in 2004, in Division Two of the European Cricket Championship. He led France's batting at that tournament, with a best of 69 not out against Israel, Bhatti did the same at the 2008 Division Two tournament, having been behind only Arun Ayyavooraju at the 2006 tournament. Bhatti took over France's captaincy at the 2008 tournament, replacing another Pakistani emigrant, Shabbir Hussain. At the 2013 European T20 Championship in England, by which time Bhatti had been replaced by Ayyavooraju as captain, he scored 196 runs from matches, more than any other French player. His best innings was 55 from 45 balls against Belgium. Outside of playing, Bhatti has also been active in promoting cricket in French primary schools.
