= Ahmed Raza =

Ahmed Raza can refer to:

- Ahmed Raza Khan Barelvi, 19th and 20th-century Islamic scholar and theologian from India
- Ahmad Raza Khan Kasuri, Pakistani politician, former Member of the National Assembly of Pakistan
- Ahmed Raza (Emirati cricketer)
- Ahmed Raza (Pakistani cricketer)
- Ahmed Raza (civil servant) (1910–1996), Pakistani civil servant and sportsman
