= Zahid Saeed =

Pakistani cricketer (born 1981)

Personal information
- Full name: Zahid Saeed
- Born: 5 July 1981 (age 45); Alo Mahar, Punjab, Pakistan
- Batting: Right-handed
- Bowling: Left-arm fast-medium
- Role: Bowler
- Relatives: Bilal Asif (nephew)

Domestic team information
- Years: Team
- Sialkot
- Gujranwala
- National Bank of Pakistan
- Pakistan Reserves

Career statistics
Competition	First-class	List A
Matches	75	58
Runs scored	880	244
Batting average	12.75	15.25
100s/50s	0/3	0/0
Top score	53	45
Balls bowled	12,528	2,787
Wickets	299	83
Bowling average	24.54	29.39
5 wickets in innings	14	2
10 wickets in match	4	0
Best bowling	6/77	6/23
Catches/stumpings	25/–	12/–
- Source: Cricinfo, 3 May 2026

Zahid Saeed (born 5 July 1981) is a Pakistani former cricketer. Saeed was a right-handed batsman who bowled left-arm fast-medium. He was born in Alo Mahar, Punjab, and played domestic cricket in Pakistan for Sialkot, Gujranwala, National Bank of Pakistan and Pakistan Reserves.

Saeed represented Pakistan Under-19s in both the 1998 Under-19 Cricket World Cup and the 2000 Under-19 Cricket World Cup. In the 2000 tournament he finished as the leading wicket-taker with 15 wickets. One of his best performances came against New Zealand Under-19s in the Super League, when he took 5 for 13 in a six-wicket win.

He made his senior domestic debut in the 1997–98 season, and later became a regular left-arm seamer in Pakistan's domestic circuit. One of his finest first-class performances came in the 2002–03 Quaid-e-Azam Trophy, when he took 6 for 77 for National Bank against Faisalabad at Iqbal Stadium, Faisalabad. In List A cricket, his best innings figures were 6 for 23.

In 2002, Saeed was one of six Pakistan domestic cricketers fined by the Pakistan Cricket Board for ball tampering during the Ramadan Cup. Two years later, he was among 22 probables called to a Pakistan training camp before the home series against India, although he did not make the final squad.

Overall, Saeed played 75 first-class matches, taking 299 wickets at a bowling average of 24.54, with 14 five-wicket hauls and four ten-wicket matches. In 58 List A matches, he took 83 wickets at an average of 29.39, including two five-wicket hauls. As a lower-order batsman, he scored 880 first-class runs with three half-centuries.

Later in his career, Saeed also played club cricket in England for Bromyard. In 2018, he scored 110 for the club in a Worcestershire County League match against Kempsey.
