= Suleman Khan =

Suleman Khan may refer to:

- Suleman Khan (cricketer) (born 1983), Pakistani cricketer
- Suleman Khan (doctor) (1939–1971), Bangladesh physician
- Suleiman Khan
- Sulaiman Khan Karrani, Sultan of Bengal
