= Mohammad Hafeez (disambiguation) =

Mohammad Hafeez is a Pakistani International cricketer.

Mohammad Hafeez may also refer to:

- Mohammad Hafeez (cricketer, born 1974), Pakistani first-class cricketer played for Multan
- Muhammad Hafeez (cyclist), former Pakistani cyclist
- Muhammad Hafeez Qureshi, Pakistani nuclear scientist
