= Pakistani cricket team in Sri Lanka in 2012 =

	Pakistan	Sri Lanka
- Dates: 1 June – 12 July
Captains	Misbah-ul-Haq (Tests & ODIs); Mohammad Hafeez (T20Is)	Mahela Jayawardene

Test series
- Result: Sri Lanka won the 3-match series 1–0
Most runs	Mohammad Hafeez (315)	Kumar Sangakkara (490)
Most wickets	Saeed Ajmal (15)	Rangana Herath (15)
- Player of the series: Kumar Sangakkara (SL)

One Day International series
- Results: Sri Lanka won the 5-match series 3–1
Most runs	Azhar Ali (217)	Kumar Sangakkara (164)
Most wickets	Mohammad Hafeez (6)	Thisara Perera (11)
- Player of the series: Thisara Perera (SL)

Twenty20 International series
- Results: 2-match series drawn 1–1
Most runs	Shahid Afridi (53)	Lahiru Thirimanne (48)
Most wickets	Sohail Tanvir (4)	Nuwan Kulasekara (4)
- Player of the series: Sohail Tanvir (Pak)

The Pakistani cricket team toured Sri Lanka from 1 June to 12 July 2012. The tour consists of two Twenty20 Internationals (T20Is), five One Day Internationals (ODIs) and three Test matches.

== Squads ==
Tests		ODIs		T20Is	
Sri Lanka	Pakistan	Sri Lanka	Pakistan	Sri Lanka	Pakistan
Mahela Jayawardene (c); Dinesh Chandimal; Tillakaratne Dilshan; Dilhara Fernando; Rangana Herath; Prasanna Jayawardene (wk); Nuwan Kulasekara; Angelo Mathews; Jeevan Mendis; Tharanga Paranavitana; Thisara Perera; Nuwan Pradeep; Suraj Randiv; Thilan Samaraweera; Kumar Sangakkara; Chanaka Welegedara	Misbah-ul-Haq (c); Abdur Rehman; Adnan Akmal (wk); Afaq Raheem; Aizaz Cheema; Asad Shafiq; Azhar Ali; Faisal Iqbal; Junaid Khan; Mohammad Ayub; Mohammad Hafeez; Mohammad Sami; Saeed Ajmal; Taufeeq Umar; Umar Gul; Younis Khan	Mahela Jayawardene (c); Dinesh Chandimal; Tillakaratne Dilshan; Dilhara Fernando; Rangana Herath; Nuwan Kulasekara; Lasith Malinga; Angelo Mathews; Jeevan Mendis; Thisara Perera; Nuwan Pradeep; Kumar Sangakkara (wk); Sachithra Senanayake; Upul Tharanga; Lahiru Thirimanne	Misbah-ul-Haq (c); Abdur Rehman; Aizaz Cheema; Asad Shafiq; Azhar Ali; Imran Farhat; Mohammad Hafeez; Mohammad Sami; Rahat Ali; Saeed Ajmal; Sarfraz Ahmed (wk); Shahid Afridi; Sohail Tanvir (Note: Sohail Tanvir replaced injured Nasir Jamshed.); Umar Akmal; Umar Gul; Younis Khan	Mahela Jayawardene (c); Dinesh Chandimal; Tillakaratne Dilshan; Chamara Kapugedera; Nuwan Kulasekara; Kaushal Lokuarachchi; Lasith Malinga; Angelo Mathews; Thisara Perera; Kumar Sangakkara (wk); Sachithra Senanayake; Upul Tharanga; Lahiru Thirimanne; Isuru Udana	Mohammad Hafeez (c); Ahmed Shehzad; Hammad Azam; Haris Sohail; Khalid Latif; Mohammad Sami; Raza Hasan; Saeed Ajmal; Shahid Afridi; Shakeel Ansar (wk); Shoaib Malik; Sohail Tanvir; Umar Akmal; Umar Gul; Yasir Arafat

== T20I series ==
=== 1st T20I ===
1 June 2012
18:00 (D/N)
Scorecard

Sri Lanka; 132/7 (20 overs)	v	Pakistan; 95 (17.4 overs)
Thisara Perera 32 (15); Sohail Tanvir 3/12 (4 overs)		Ahmed Shehzad 36 (42); Angelo Mathews 2/8 (4 overs)

Sri Lanka won by 37 runs
Mahinda Rajapaksa International Stadium, Hambantota
Umpires: Asoka de Silva (SL) and Ranmore Martinesz (SL)
Player of the match: Thisara Perera (SL)

- Sri Lanka won the toss and elected to bat.
- Shakeel Ansar (Pak) and Kaushal Lokuarachchi, Sachithra Senanayake and Lahiru Thirimanne (all SL) made their T20I debuts.

=== 2nd T20I ===
3 June 2012
18:00 (D/N)
Scorecard

Pakistan; 122/6 (20 overs)	v	Sri Lanka; 99 (19.2 overs)
Shahid Afridi 52 (33); Mohammed Sami 3/16 (3 overs)		Chamara Kapugedara 19 (23); Nuwan Kulasekara 2/13 (4 overs)

Pakistan won by 23 runs
Mahinda Rajapaksa International Stadium, Hambantota
Umpires: Ranmore Martinesz (SL) and Ruchira Palliyaguruge (SL)
Player of the match: Shahid Afridi (Pak)

- Pakistan won the toss and elected to bat.

== ODI series ==
=== 1st ODI ===
7 June 2012
14:30 (D/N)
Scorecard

Sri Lanka; 135/8 (42 overs)	v	Pakistan; 135/4 (34.1 overs)
Lahiru Thirimanne 42* (73); Umar Gul 3/24 (9 overs)		Mohammad Hafeez 37 (57); Nuwan Kulasekara 1/29 (9 overs)

Pakistan won by 6 wickets (D/L method)
Pallekele International Cricket Stadium, Kandy
Umpires: Ranmore Martinesz (SL) and Paul Reiffel (Aus)
Player of the match: Umar Gul (Pak)

- Sri Lanka won the toss and elected to bat.

=== 2nd ODI ===
9 June 2012
14:30 (D/N)
Scorecard

Sri Lanka; 280/4 (50 overs)	v	Pakistan; 204 (46.2 overs)
Tillakaratne Dilshan 119* (139); Mohammad Hafeez 1/30 (8 overs)		Azhar Ali 96 (119); Thisara Perera 6/44 (10 overs)

Sri Lanka won by 76 runs
Pallekele International Cricket Stadium, Kandy
Umpires: Ruchira Palliyaguruge (SL) and Paul Reiffel (Aus)
Player of the match: Thisara Perera (SL)

- Sri Lanka won the toss and elected to bat.

=== 3rd ODI ===
13 June 2012
14:30 (D/N)
Scorecard

Pakistan; 12/2 (6.2 overs)	v	Sri Lanka
Azhar Ali 7 (14); Nuwan Kulasekara 1/3 (3 overs)

No result
R. Premadasa Stadium, Colombo
Umpires: Asoka de Silva (SL) and Paul Reiffel (Aus)

- Pakistan won the toss and elected to bat.

=== 4th ODI ===
16 June
14:30 (D/N)
Scorecard

Sri Lanka; 243/8 (50 overs)	v	Pakistan; 199 (45 overs)
Kumar Sangakkara 97 (130); Mohammad Hafeez 2/37 (10 overs)		Azhar Ali 81* (126); Thisara Perera 4/42 (10 overs)

Sri Lanka won by 44 runs
R. Premadasa Stadium, Colombo
Umpires: Ranmore Martinesz (SL) and Paul Reiffel (Aus)
Player of the match: Thisara Perera (SL)

- Sri Lanka won the toss and elected to bat.
- Thisara Perera (SL) took his first ODI hat-trick.
- Azhar Ali (Pakistan) became the first player to carry his bat through a completed innings in an ODI since Javed Omar for Bangladesh against Zimbabwe in 2001.

=== 5th ODI ===
18 June 2012
14:30 (D/N)
Scorecard

Pakistan; 247/7 (50 overs)	v	Sri Lanka; 248/8 (49.4 overs)
Imran Farhat 56 (63); Jeevan Mendis 2/30 (9 overs)		Angelo Mathews 80* (76); Sohail Tanvir 3/42 (10 overs)

Sri Lanka won by 2 wickets
R. Premadasa Stadium, Colombo
Umpires: Ranmore Martinesz (SL) and Paul Reiffel (Aus)
Player of the match: Angelo Mathews (SL)

- Pakistan won the toss and elected to bat.

== Test series ==
=== 1st Test ===
22–26 June 2012
Scorecard

Sri Lanka	v	Pakistan
472 (153.2 overs); Kumar Sangakkara 199* (562); Saeed Ajmal 5/146 (46 overs)		100 (54.3 overs); Younis Khan 29 (91); Suraj Randiv 4/13 (9.3 overs)
137/5d (41 overs); Tillakaratne Dilshan 56 (58); Junaid Khan 3/44 (13 overs)		300 (114 overs); Younis Khan 87 (213); Nuwan Kulasekara 3/48 (23 overs)

Sri Lanka won by 209 runs
Galle International Stadium, Galle
Umpires: Steve Davis (Aus) and Ian Gould (Eng)
Player of the match: Kumar Sangakkara (SL)

- Sri Lanka won the toss and elected to bat.
- Mohammad Ayub (Pak) made his Test debut.

=== 2nd Test ===
30 June – 4 July 2012
Scorecard

Pakistan	v	Sri Lanka
551/6d (147 overs); Mohammad Hafeez 196 (331); Rangana Herath 3/164 (49 overs)		391 (124.4 overs); Kumar Sangakkara 192 (351); Junaid Khan 5/73 (28 overs)
100/2d (18 overs); Taufeeq Umar 42* (57); Suraj Randiv 2/28 (4 overs)		86/2 (22 overs); Tharanga Paranavitana 32 (72); Abdur Rehman 1/19 (9 overs)

Match drawn
Sinhalese Sports Club Ground, Colombo
Umpires: Ian Gould (Eng) and Simon Taufel (Aus)
Player of the match: Junaid Khan (Pak)

- Sri Lanka won the toss and elected to field.

=== 3rd Test ===
8–12 July 2012
Scorecard

Pakistan	v	Sri Lanka
226 (72.5 overs); Asad Shafiq 75 (158); Thisara Perera 4/63 (18 overs)		337 (100.2 overs); Thisara Perera 75 (86); Junaid Khan 5/70 (28.2 overs)
380/8d (104 overs); Azhar Ali 136 (284); Rangana Herath 4/99 (39.4 overs)		195/4 (62 overs); Kumar Sangakkara 74* (125); Saeed Ajmal 3/50 (26 overs)

Match drawn
Pallekele International Cricket Stadium, Kandy
Umpires: Steve Davis (Aus) and Simon Taufel (Aus)
Player of the match: Asad Shafiq (Pak)

- Sri Lanka won the toss and elected to field.
- No play was possible on day 2 due to rain.
