= Mohammad Haroon (cricketer) =

Pakistani cricketer (born 1968)

Muhammad Haroon
Personal information
- Born: 8 January 1968 (age 58); Sheikhupura, Punjab, Pakistan
- Batting: Right-handed
- Bowling: Right-arm leg spin
- Role: All-rounder

Domestic team information
- Years: Team
- 1999–2000: Lahore Division
- 2000–2002: Sheikhupura

Career statistics
Competition	FC	LA
Matches	11	11
Runs scored	661	259
Batting average	44.06	37.00
100s/50s	2/3	0/1
Top score	130	64*
Balls bowled	880	417
Wickets	13	13
Bowling average	43.53	25.15
5 wickets in innings	0	0
10 wickets in match	0	n/a
Best bowling	3/68	4/35
Catches/stumpings	5/–	15/–
- Source: CricketArchive, 2 September 2015

Muhammad Haroon (born 8 January 1968) is a Pakistani former cricketer who was the head coach of the Norwegian national side. A right-handed leg spinner and competent middle-to-lower-order batsman, his playing career included first-class matches for Lahore Division (from 1999 to 2000) and for Sheikhupura (from 2000 to 2002). Holding a level-4 ECB coaching qualification, Haroon was appointed the Norwegian cricket team's head coach in early 2014. He served Norwegian Cricket Federation as head coach and director of cricket from 2015 till December 2018.

== Playing career ==
Born in Sheikhupura, Haroon played for Lahore Division at the 1986–87 National Under-19 Championship, and made his grade-II Quaid-e-Azam Trophy debut during the 1990–91 season, for the same team. One of his most notable performances in that competition, which did not have first-class status, came in December 1995, when he took 8/138 and 5/153 in the final against the Karachi Greens (match figures of 13/291). During the 1998–99 season, Lahore Division won the grade-II Quaid-e-Azam final against Multan, winning through to the main division. Haroon consequently made his first-class debut during the 1999–00 season, scoring a half century, 51 runs, against Bahawalpur in his first match. He finished the season having played in only five of a possible nine matches, but scored 519 runs at a batting average of 86.50, the sixth-highest average in the competition. This included two centuries – 107 against Hyderabad, and then a career-high 130 against WPDA.

Haroon also made his limited-overs debut during the 1999–00 season, playing two Tissot Cup matches and four National Bank Cup matches for Lahore Division. The following season, however, he switched to playing for the new Sheikhupura team, which was largely a direct replacement for the disbanded Lahore Division. In that season's one-day tournament, he scored a maiden half-century, 64 not out against Gujranwala, and in the same match also took what was to be his best bowling figures, 4/35 from seven overs. In the other one-day matches, Haroon was less successful, and in the Quaid-e-Azam Trophy, he failed to score a single half-century from his five matches, as well as taking only three wickets. During the 2001–02 season, he played only once for Sheikhupura, against Rawalpindi in the Quaid-e-Azam, which was his final high-level competitive match. Haroon had spent the 2001 English season playing club cricket for Market Deeping in the Lincolnshire Premier League, and remained with the club through to the end of the 2006 season. After that, from 2007 to 2011, he switched to Nassington, a club in the Cambridgeshire and Huntingdonshire League.

After 2011 Haroon joined Ramsey Cricket Club and was a massive influence with both coaching and playing until his departure to coach Norway in 2014.

Haroon played for Falken Cricket klubb Norwegian League in season 2015/16 as an allrounder.

== Coaching career ==
While still playing club cricket, Haroon began to train as a coach, eventually becoming the first person from the Subcontinent to gain a level-4 qualification from the England and Wales Cricket Board (ECB). In early 2014, he was appointed head coach of Norway for an initial four-month term, which included the 2014 ICC European T20 Championship Division Two tournament. Haroon lead the team to win the tournament. After that Haroon was appointed as director of cricket and head coach and coached the team at the 2015 European Division One and the 2015 World Cricket League Division Six tournaments. He also lead the Norwegian team to win the ICC Europe Division 2 title in 2018 with a young side. During Haroon’s tenure as Director of Cricket and Head Coach of the Norwegian national team, the Norwegian Cricket Federation was granted ICC Accelerated Growth Member status in 2017, in recognition of its rapid progress in cricket development. He has also been involved in coaching the national under-19 side, organising a tour of Lincolnshire during the 2014 season using the connections from his playing career. In February 2023, Haroon was appointed as the Head Coach and Player Pathway Lead of the Qatar national cricket team. During his tenure, he led the team in several key tournaments, including the 2023 Gulf T20I Championship, the ICC Men’s T20 World Cup Asia Qualifier, and the 2024 ACC Premier Cup. Under his leadership, Qatar beat some higher ranking teams which enabled them to have stable ICC T20I ranking. In addition to that Qatar’s cricketing profile improved significantly, culminating in the QCA receiving the ICC Global Development Award for Initiative of the Year 2023–24. Haroon also played a pivotal role in establishing structured age-group pathways and expanding youth participation across the country.
