= Pakistani cricket team in Australia in 2002 =

The Pakistan national cricket team toured Australia in June 2002, well outside the normal Australian cricket season. They played 3 One Day Internationals. Pakistan won 2–1.

== LOI series summary ==
=== 1st ODI ===
12 June 2002 (D/N)
Scorecard

Pakistan; 176/8 (50 overs)	v	Australia; 177/3 (32.5 overs)
Imran Nazir 39* (53); AJ Bichel 3/30 (10 overs)		AC Gilchrist 56 (47); Mohammad Sami 2/53 (9 overs)

Australia won by 7 wickets
Colonial Stadium, Melbourne
Umpires: DJ Harper (AUS) and RB Tiffin (ZIM)
Player of the match: AC Gilchrist (AUS)

- Australia won the toss and elected to field.

=== 2nd ODI ===
15 June 2002 (D/N)
Scorecard

Australia; 167 (45.4 overs)	v	Pakistan; 168/8 (48.5 overs)
DR Martyn 56 (87); Wasim Akram 3/18 (8 overs)		Younis Khan 56* (76); B Lee 2/44 (10 overs)

Pakistan won by 2 wickets
Colonial Stadium, Melbourne
Umpires: DB Hair (AUS) and RB Tiffin (ZIM)
Player of the match: Younis Khan (PAK)

- Australia won the toss and elected to bat.

=== 3rd ODI ===
19 June 2002 (D/N)
Scorecard

Pakistan; 256/7 (50 overs)	v	Australia; 165 (40 overs)
Imran Nazir 66 (73); SK Warne 2/42 (10 overs)		SR Watson 44* (78); Shoaib Akhtar 5/25 (8 overs)

Pakistan won by 91 runs
Brisbane Cricket Ground, Woolloongabba, Brisbane
Umpires: SJA Taufel (AUS) and RB Tiffin (ZIM)
Player of the match: Shoaib Akhtar (PAK)

- Pakistan won the toss and elected to bat.
