= New Zealand cricket team against Afghanistan in India in 2024 =

International cricket tour

	Afghanistan	New Zealand
- Dates: 9 – 13 September 2024
Captains	Hashmatullah Shahidi	Tim Southee

Test series

The New Zealand cricket team toured India in September 2024 to play the Afghanistan cricket team. The tour consisted of one Test match, which was the first such match between the two teams and the first Test match to be played at Shaheed Vijay Singh Pathik Sports Complex in Greater Noida.

The scheduled Test match was abandoned without a ball bowled, due to a wet outfield and persistent heavy rain. This was the eighth instance of a Test match being abandoned without a single ball being bowled. It has been announced the two teams will play the one-off test in a future season in Doha.

== Squads ==
Afghanistan	New Zealand
Hashmatullah Shahidi (c); Khalil Ahmed; Qais Ahmad; Ikram Alikhil (wk); Riaz Hassan; Zahir Khan; Abdul Malik; Nijat Masood; Azmatullah Omarzai; Bahir Shah; Rahmat Shah; Shahidullah; Zia-ur-Rehman; Shamsurrahman; ~~Ibrahim Zadran~~; Afsar Zazai (wk)	Tim Southee (c); Tom Latham (vc); Tom Blundell (wk); Michael Bracewell; Devon Conway (wk); Matt Henry; Daryl Mitchell; William O'Rourke; Ajaz Patel; Glenn Phillips; Rachin Ravindra; Mitchell Santner; Ben Sears; Kane Williamson; Will Young

On 8 September 2024, Ibrahim Zadran was ruled out the series due to an ankle sprain in his left leg.

== Only Test ==
9–13 September 2024
Scorecard

Afghanistan	v	New Zealand

Match abandoned
Shaheed Vijay Singh Pathik Sports Complex, Greater Noida
Umpires: Kumar Dharmasena (SL) and Sharfuddoula (Ban)

- No toss.
- No play was possible on all five days due to rain and wet outfield.
