= Mujahid Jamshed =

Pakistani cricketer (born 1971)

Personal information
- Born: 1 December 1971 (age 54); Muridke, Punjab, Pakistan
- Batting: Right-handed
- Bowling: Right-arm medium

International information
- National side: Pakistan
- ODI debut (cap 116): 7 January 1997 v Australia
- Last ODI: 18 January 1997 v West Indies

Career statistics
Competition	ODI
Matches	4
Runs scored	27
Batting average	13.50
100s/50s	0/0
Top score	23
Balls bowled	24
Wickets	1
Bowling average	6.00
5 wickets in innings	0
10 wickets in match	0
Best bowling	1/6
Catches/stumpings	0/–
- Source: ESPNCricinfo, 3 May 2006

Mujahid Jamshed (born 1 December 1971) is a former Pakistani cricketer who played four One Day Internationals in 1997. A right-handed middle-order batsman, he was called into the squad and made his debut during the 1996–97 ODI triangular tournament in Australia. He was born at Muridke in Sheikhupura District of Punjab.

In domestic cricket, he played for a number of teams, including Gujranwala Cricket Association, Habib Bank Limited, Lahore, Pakistan Automobiles Corporation, Pakistan University Grants Commission, and Sheikhupura Cricket Association.
