= 2008 Champions League Twenty20 =

Cricket tournament; cancelled

- Administrators: BCCI; Cricket Australia; Cricket South Africa
- Cricket format: Twenty20
- Tournament format(s): Round-robin and knockout
- Participants: 8

The 2008 Champions League Twenty20 was scheduled to be the first edition of the Champions League Twenty20, an international club cricket tournament. It was due to be held in India between 3 and 10 December 2008, where the winners were to earn around US$6 million. The 2008 Mumbai attacks just one week prior to the tournament resulted in its postponement. It was proposed that the tournament be held in early 2009, but dates for its rearrangement could not be found and the tournament was cancelled on 12 December. The league's first season was held in 2009.

Eight teams from five nations were invited for the tournament.

Qualified teams
Team	Country	Domestic tournament	Position	Group
Chennai Super Kings	India	2008 Indian Premier League	Runner-up	A
Dolphins	South Africa	2007–08 Standard Bank Pro20	Runner-up	B
Middlesex Crusaders	England	2008 Twenty20 Cup	Winner	A
Rajasthan Royals	India	2008 Indian Premier League	Winner	B
Sialkot Stallions	Pakistan	2008–09 RBS Twenty-20 Cup	Winner	B
Titans	South Africa	2007–08 Standard Bank Pro20	Winner	A
Victorian Bushrangers	Australia	2007–08 KFC Twenty20 Big Bash	Winner	A
Western Warriors	Australia	2007–08 KFC Twenty20 Big Bash	Runner-up	B

The tournament organisers stated that any team competing would be banned from fielding players who had competed in the Indian Cricket League, a rival to the Indian Premier League, an annual T20 competition in India. As a result of this, the participation of English teams in the tournament was put in jeopardy: during the 2008 English season, 15 of the 18 county teams fielded players from the ICL. On 24 July 2008, IPL commissioner Lalit Modi confirmed their stance by stating that only Middlesex and Essex stood a chance of being invited to the Champions League because they did not have ICL links.
