= 2008–09 Quaid-e-Azam Trophy =

Cricket tournament

- Dates: 26 January 2009 – 7 March 2009
- Administrator: Pakistan Cricket Board
- Cricket format: First-class
- Tournament format(s): Two round-robin groups and final
- Host: Pakistan
- Champions: Sialkot (2nd title)
- Participants: 22
- Matches: 111
- Official website: www.pcb.com.pk

The 2008–09 Quaid-e-Azam Trophy was one of two first-class domestic cricket competitions that were held in Pakistan during the 2008–09 season. It was the 51st edition of the Quaid-e-Azam Trophy, contested by 22 teams representing regional cricket associations and departments, (Note: The top level of domestic cricket in Pakistan was historically played by teams representing regional cricket associations and departments, which were owned and run by corporations, institutions or government departments.) and was preceded in the schedule by the Pentangular Cup, contested by five teams representing the four provinces and the federal areas.

The format of the competition remained the same as the previous season, with the teams split into two groups of eleven playing four-day matches in a round-robin and a five-day final between the top teams in each group to determine the winner. There were, however, changes to the structure of the groups; whereas the regions are departments were divided evenly between the groups in 2007–08, in 2008–09 the nine departmental teams were in Group A and eleven of the regional teams were in Group B; since both Karachi and Lahore had two teams in the competition, in order to even the groups, one from each was placed in Group A. The Group B match between Quetta and Rawalpindi was completed in 20.1 overs, with a match aggregate of 85 runs being scored. It was the lowest run-aggregate for a completed first-class cricket match, although both sides had forfeited their first innings after no play was possible on the first two days due to bad weather.

Sialkot beat Khan Research Laboratories, who had reached the final on net run rate, by 4 wickets in the final to win the trophy for the second time.

== Group stage ==
The top teams in the round-robin group stage (highlighted) advanced to the final.

Group A
Team	Pld	W	L	D	A	Pts
Khan Research Labs.	10	5	0	5	0	51
National Bank of Pakistan	10	5	0	5	0	51
Pakistan International Airlines	10	4	2	4	0	42
Sui Northern Gas Pipelines Ltd.	10	4	2	4	0	36
Zarai Taraqiati Bank Ltd.	10	3	1	6	0	33
Habib Bank Ltd.	10	3	2	5	0	27
Water and Power Dev. Auth.	10	2	0	8	0	21
Sui Southern Gas Corp.	10	0	4	6	0	15
Karachi Whites	10	0	4	6	0	9
Lahore Shalimar	10	0	4	6	0	6
Pakistan Customs	10	0	7	3	0	0

Group B
Team	Pld	W	L	D	A	Pts
Sialkot	10	6	2	2	0	60
Rawalpindi	10	6	0	4	0	54
Islamabad	10	4	2	4	0	45
Abbottabad	10	3	2	5	0	27
Multan	10	3	3	4	0	27
Lahore Ravi	10	1	0	9	0	27
Faisalabad	10	2	1	7	0	24
Karachi Blues	10	2	3	5	0	24
Peshawar	10	2	4	4	0	18
Hyderabad	10	0	5	5	0	6
Quetta	10	1	8	1	0	6

Position determined by total points, most matches won after having a lead on first innings, fewest matches lost, followed by adjusted net run rate (matches with no result, i.e. those where both teams did not complete their first innings, were disregarded); matches finishing in a draw were decided on first innings scores, with points awarded as follows:
- Win = 9 points
- Win having tied or trailed on first innings = 6 points
- Draw having led on first innings = 3 points
- Loss, draw having trailed or with no result on first innings, or abandoned without a ball bowled = 0 points

== Final ==
3–7 March 2009
Scorecard

Khan Research Laboratories	v	Sialkot
296 (110.1 overs); Azhar Ali 99 (293); Nayyer Abbas 3/54 (28 overs)		386 (122.4 overs); Naeemuddin 135 (280); Saeed Ajmal 5/105 (38.4 overs)
247 (78.4 overs); Ali Naqvi 86 (115); Naved Arif 6/58 (24 overs)		158/6 (46.3 overs); Ayaz Tasawwar 53 (82); Yasir Ali 4/64 (20 overs)

Sialkot won by 4 wickets
Jinnah Stadium, Sialkot
Umpires: Riazuddin and Zameer Haider
Player of the match: Naeemuddin (Sialkot)

- Sialkot won the toss and elected to field.
