= Taimur Ali =

Pakistani cricketer (born 1991)

Personal information
- Born: 1 June 1991 (age 35); Usta Mohammad, Balochistan, Pakistan
- Batting: Right-handed
- Bowling: Right-arm Offbreak
Medal record
Men's Cricket
Representing Pakistan
South Asian Games
Bronze medal – third place	2010 Dhaka	Team
- Source: Cricinfo, 14 November 2015

Taimur Ali (born 1 June 1991) is a Pakistani cricketer who played for the Balochistan cricket team. In January 2021, he was named in Balochistan's squad for the 2020–21 Pakistan Cup.
