= Kamran Naeem =

Pakistani cricketer (born 1987)

Personal information
- Born: 18 May 1987 (age 39); Faisalabad, Pakistan
- Batting: Right-handed
- Role: Wicket-keeper
- Source: Cricinfo, 14 November 2015

Kamran Naeem (born 18 May 1987) is a Pakistani first-class cricketer who played for Faisalabad cricket team and Zarai Taraqiati Bank Limited.
