= 2002–03 Quaid-e-Azam Trophy =

Cricket tournament

- Dates: 21 December 2002 – 20 February 2003
- Administrator: Pakistan Cricket Board
- Cricket format: First-class
- Tournament format(s): 4 round-robin groups, pre-quarter-finals, quarter-finals, semi-finals and final
- Host: Pakistan
- Champions: Pakistan International Airlines (6th title)
- Participants: 24
- Matches: 75
- Most runs: Misbah-ul-Haq (963)
- Most wickets: Jaffar Nazir (44)
- Official website: www.pcb.com.pk

The 2002–03 Quaid-e-Azam Trophy was a first-class domestic cricket competition held in Pakistan during the 2002–03 season. It was contested by 24 teams representing departments and regional associations, divided into four qualifying groups of six teams each, with the top four teams in each group advancing to the pre-quarter-finals.

The knockout rounds were heavily affected by rain, and the semi-finals and final were shifted to Karachi. Pakistan International Airlines won the trophy for the sixth time, defeating Khan Research Laboratories by 10 wickets in the final at the National Stadium in Karachi. Misbah-ul-Haq was the competition's leading run-scorer with 963 runs, while Jaffar Nazir took 44 wickets, the most in the tournament.

== Group stage ==
The top four teams in each group (highlighted) advanced to the pre-quarter-finals.

=== Group I ===
Team	P	W	WLF	L	DWF	DLF	ND	Pts	NRR
National Bank of Pakistan	5	2	0	0	0	1	2	24	0.282
Water and Power Development Authority	5	1	0	0	3	0	1	21	0.574
Faisalabad	5	1	0	1	1	1	1	15	0.398
Sargodha	5	1	0	1	1	1	1	15	-0.366
Service Industries	5	0	0	2	1	0	2	3	0.277
Lahore Blues	5	0	0	1	0	3	1	0	-0.917

=== Group II ===
Team	P	W	WLF	L	DWF	DLF	ND	Pts	NRR
Allied Bank Limited	5	4	0	0	1	0	0	51	1.012
Bahawalpur	5	2	0	1	1	1	0	27	0.105
Public Works Department	5	1	0	0	2	2	0	18	-0.326
Multan	5	1	0	2	0	2	0	12	-0.321
Karachi Whites	5	0	0	1	3	1	0	9	0.645
Dadu	5	0	0	4	0	1	0	0	-1.138

=== Group III ===
Team	P	W	WLF	L	DWF	DLF	ND	Pts	NRR
Pakistan Customs	5	1	0	0	2	0	2	18	-0.112
Habib Bank Limited	5	0	1	0	1	1	2	12	0.526
Lahore Whites	5	1	0	0	0	3	1	12	-0.622
Sialkot	5	0	0	1	2	1	1	6	0.773
Gujranwala	5	0	0	1	1	1	2	3	-0.070
Sheikhupura	5	0	0	1	1	1	2	3	-0.324

=== Group IV ===
Team	P	W	WLF	L	DWF	DLF	ND	Pts	NRR
Pakistan International Airlines	5	4	0	0	0	1	0	48	0.687
Khan Research Laboratories	5	3	0	0	2	0	0	42	0.120
Rawalpindi	5	2	0	2	0	1	0	24	0.242
Zarai Taraqiati Bank Limited	5	1	0	2	1	1	0	15	-0.055
Karachi Blues	5	1	0	3	0	1	0	12	-0.665
Peshawar	5	0	0	4	1	0	0	3	-0.180

Position determined by total points, then net run rate. The official tables also included an Adj column for adjustments, but all teams had zero adjustments. Points were awarded as follows:
- Win = 12 points
- Win but lost on first innings = 9 points
- Draw having led on first innings = 3 points
- Draw having trailed on first innings = 0 points
- No decision on first innings = 0 points
- Loss = 0 points

== Knockout stage ==
A pre-quarter-final round was played from 22 to 25 January 2003 to reduce the field from sixteen qualifiers to eight quarter-finalists.

Date	Stage	Match	Result
28–31 January 2003	Quarter-final	Khan Research Laboratories v National Bank of Pakistan	Match drawn - Khan Research Laboratories qualified on first innings lead.
28–31 January 2003	Quarter-final	Pakistan International Airlines v Water and Power Development Authority	Match drawn - Pakistan International Airlines qualified on better run rate.
28–31 January 2003	Quarter-final	Rawalpindi v Sargodha	Match drawn - Rawalpindi qualified on better run rate.
28–31 January 2003	Quarter-final	Zarai Taraqiati Bank Limited v Faisalabad	Faisalabad won outright.
3–5 February 2003	Semi-final	Khan Research Laboratories v Faisalabad	Khan Research Laboratories won by 10 wickets.
6–8 February 2003	Semi-final	Pakistan International Airlines v Rawalpindi	Pakistan International Airlines won by an innings and 34 runs.
17–20 February 2003	Final	Khan Research Laboratories v Pakistan International Airlines	Pakistan International Airlines won by 10 wickets.

== Final ==
17–20 February 2003
Scorecard

Khan Research Laboratories	v	Pakistan International Airlines
263 (79.3 overs); Ali Naqvi 91 (181); Najaf Shah 4/108 (29.3 overs)		466 (140.4 overs); Yasir Hameed 207 (345); Jaffar Nazir 7/104 (34.4 overs)
214 (56 overs); Saeed Bin Nasir 65 (107); Umar Gul 5/69 (14 overs)		12/0 (13.4 overs); Kamran Sajid 5* (42)

Pakistan International Airlines won by 10 wickets
National Stadium, Karachi
Umpires: Asad Rauf and Riazuddin

- Pakistan International Airlines won the toss and elected to field.
- The match was scheduled for five days but completed in four.
