= Rashid Mansoor =

Pakistani cricketer (born 1979)

Personal information
- Born: 6 April 1979 (age 47); Kohat, Pakistan
- Batting: Right-handed
- Bowling: Right-arm medium fast
- Source: Cricinfo, 12 November 2015

Rashid Mansoor (born 6 April 1979) is a Pakistani first-class cricketer who played for the Abbottabad cricket team.
