= Mahfooz Sabri =

Pakistani cricketer (born 1985)

Personal information
- Born: 20 May 1985 (age 41); Peshawar, Pakistan
- Source: Cricinfo, 14 November 2015

Mahfooz Sabri (born 20 May 1985) is a Pakistani first-class cricketer who played for Peshawar cricket team.
