= Fawad Hussain =

Pakistani cricketer (born 1989)

Personal information
- Born: 28 August 1989 (age 37); Rawalpindi, Pakistan
- Source: Cricinfo, 14 November 2015

Fawad Hussain (born 28 August 1989) is a Pakistani first-class cricketer who played for Rawalpindi cricket team.
