= Farhan Khan (Quetta cricketer) =

Pakistani cricketer (born 1990)

Personal information
- Born: 3 March 1990 (age 36); Mastung, Pakistan
- Source: Cricinfo, 14 November 2015

Farhan Khan (born 3 March 1990) is a Pakistani first-class cricketer who played for Quetta cricket team.
