= Junaid Malik =

Pakistani cricketer (born 1990)

Personal information
- Born: 25 April 1990 (age 36); Lahore, Pakistan
- Source: Cricinfo, 12 November 2015

Junaid Malik (born 25 April 1990) is a Pakistani first-class cricketer who played for Lahore cricket team.
