= Naved Arif =

Pakistani cricketer

Personal information
- Full name: Naved Arif Gondal
- Born: 2 November 1981 (age 45); Mandi Bahauddin, Punjab, Pakistan
- Batting: Left-handed
- Bowling: Left-arm medium-fast

Domestic team information
- Years: Team
- 2001/02–2002/03: Gujranwala
- 2008/09–2009/10: Sialkot
- 2008/09–2009/10: Sialkot Stallions
- 2011–2012: Sussex

Career statistics
| Competition | FC | LA | T20 |
|---|---|---|---|
| Matches | 43 | 24 | 19 |
| Runs scored | 759 | 141 | 20 |
| Batting average | 18.07 | 17.62 | 5.00 |
| 100s/50s | 1/0 | 0/0 | 0/0 |
| Top score | 100* | 49 | 12 |
| Balls bowled | 7,941 | 811 | 345 |
| Wickets | 181 | 19 | 14 |
| Bowling average | 24.38 | 41.42 | 27.64 |
| 5 wickets in innings | 10 | 0 | 0 |
| 10 wickets in match | 1 | 0 | 0 |
| Best bowling | 7/66 | 3/19 | 3/12 |
| Catches/stumpings | 13/– | 10/– | 4/– |
- Source: Cricinfo, 18 December 2018

Naved Arif Gondal (born 2 December 1981) is a Pakistani former cricketer, who played as a left-handed batsman and left-arm medium-fast bowler. He played first-class cricket for Sussex in the English county championship. In 2014, the England and Wales Cricket Board banned Naved for life from all forms of cricket over match fixing.

== Career ==
=== Gujranwala Cricket Association ===
Naved began his career at Gujranwala in Pakistan. He made his first-class debut on 26 January 2002 against Hyderabad in the Quaid-e-Azam Trophy. He took 5–28 in his first innings. In his first season, he finished as the fourth highest wicket taker in his team despite only playing three matches. He took 19 wickets at an average of 16.05, with an economy rate of 2.64. Arif made his List A debut on 28 February 2003 in the NBP Patrons Cup against Sargodha. He took 1–71 in his 10 overs and scored 49 runs from 37 balls. In his second season of first-class cricket at Gujranwala, Arif took 18 wickets in four matches at an average of 20.11.

=== Sialkot Cricket Association ===
In the 2008/09 Quaid-e-Azam Trophy, he represented Sialkot and played a key part in their victorious trophy winning team, playing eleven matches and taking 62 wickets at an average of 22.38. In the final he took 6–58 in the second innings to help set up a target of 158 runs for Sialkot to win the trophy which they achieved for the loss of 6 wickets. His six wicket haul in the final made him the leading wicket taker in the 2008/09 Quaid-e-Azam Trophy by a single wicket. In the 2009/10 Quaid-e-Azam Trophy, Naved achieved his career best figures of 7–66. He also took 3 wickets in the second innings to achieve his first ever 10 wicket haul in a match with overall match figures of 10–96.

=== Rawtenstall Cricket Club ===
Naved Arif signed for Rawtenstall Cricket Club in the Lancashire League in Northern England during the 2010 season. Arif was largely described as a big success despite taking time to come to terms with English conditions. He took 64 wickets during the season with an average of 18.00 and a best of 8–35 against Lowerhouse Cricket Club. He was also a useful run scorer for the club. He scored 769 runs at 40.5 with five half centuries. It was at Rawtenstall CC that Arif was given his nickname 'Barry' (as in the Great Barry Arif) a nickname that was adopted by his next club, Sussex.

=== Sussex County Cricket Club ===
In February 2011, Sussex announced that they had signed Arif for the 2011 season, ironically on the same day as they signed New Zealander Lou Vincent, who would also later be banned for match fixing. They stated that he would qualify to play as a non-overseas player due to his Danish-born wife. Mark Robinson, the Sussex coach, said that, "Naved is a late developer, and with his background in Pakistan he's had to do it the tough way." He added, "His record out there on unhelpful wickets is outstanding and he's got the potential to change games". Naved Arif made his debut for Sussex in the County Championship match against Lancashire at Liverpool. Arif managed only 1 wicket in the match as Lancashire beat Sussex comfortably. He achieved cult hero status in his home debut at Hove. Once again, Sussex were facing almost certain defeat against Lancashire when Arif put on 90 runs with Monty Panesar for the 10th wicket to save the match. He also achieved his highest score in first-class cricket as he converted his first ever half century into an unbeaten century. Despite having the fourth best first-class average for Sussex in 2011, Naved Arif only played four matches. He took 15 wickets at 25.86. He made more of an impact in the List A campaign where he played twelve matches and took 9 wickets at 45.77 regularly bowling in tandem with fellow left handed fast bowler, Chris Liddle. In November 2011, Sussex announced that Naved Arif had signed a new one-year contract with Sussex. Naved stated, "I want to say thank you to Sussex for keeping faith in me. I know I have so much more to give the team in 2012 and I aim to establish myself as a regular". Cricket manager, Mark Robinson said, "I’m delighted that Naveed has agreed to come back for another year. Despite his age, he is still in many ways inexperienced. He is still learning and has got lots more to give."

== Corruption charge and life ban ==
In May 2015, he was charged by the ECB after spot-fixing allegations relating to Sussex's Clydesdale Bank 40 match against Kent in August 2011. He pleaded guilty to the charges a month later, and was handed a life ban from all international and domestic cricket.

== Personal life ==
Arif is married to a Danish citizen and therefore qualified to play for Sussex as a non-overseas player.

== See also ==
- List of cricketers banned for corruption
