= Ali Raza (cricketer, born 1987) =

Pakistani cricketer (born 1987)

Personal information
- Born: 28 May 1987 (age 39); Faisalabad, Punjab Province
- Batting: Left-handed
- Bowling: Right-arm Fast medium
- Source: Cricinfo, 14 November 2015

Ali Raza (born 28 May 1987) is a Pakistani first-class cricketer who plays for Faisalabad cricket team.
