= Noor-ul-Amin =

Pakistani cricketer (born 1975)

Personal information
- Born: 4 February 1975 (age 51); Mardan, Pakistan
- Batting: Left-handed
- Bowling: Slow left-arm orthodox
- Source: ESPNcricinfo, 12 November 2015

Noor-ul-Amin (born 4 February 1975) is a Pakistani former first-class cricketer who played for the Abbottabad cricket team.
