= Saleem Mughal =

Pakistani cricketer (born 1978)

Personal information
- Full name: Mohammad Saleem Mughal
- Born: 4 March 1978 (age 48); Sheikhupura, Punjab, Pakistan
- Batting: Right-handed
- Bowling: Right-arm off-spin

Domestic team information
- Years: Team
- 1998–99: Water and Power Development Authority
- 1999–2000: Lahore Division
- 2000–01 to 2002–03: Sheikhupura
- 2001–02 to 2013–14: Sui Northern Gas Pipelines

Career statistics
Competition	FC	List A
Matches	70	62
Runs scored	3142	1862
Batting average	32.72	45.71
100s/50s	6/18	1/14
Top score	193	133 not out
Balls bowled	2090	1702
Wickets	18	29
Bowling average	56.55	46.34
5 wickets in innings	0	0
10 wickets in match	0	–
Best bowling	3/40	3/30
Catches/stumpings	50/–	26/–
- Source: Cricinfo, 20 January 2015

Mohammad Saleem Mughal (born 4 March 1978) is a Pakistani former cricketer. A right-handed batsman and right-arm off-spin bowler, he played first-class cricket from 1998 to 2014.

Saleem Mughal's most successful first-class season was 1999–2000, when he scored 693 runs at an average of 53.76, with three centuries, including his highest score of 193 for Lahore Division in an innings victory over Hyderabad. His highest List A score was 133 not out, when he captained Sheikhupura against Public Works Department in 2002–03.
