= Sialkot Cricket Association =

Cricket association in Pakistan

Sialkot Cricket Association governs cricket in the district of Sialkot in Pakistan.

In April 2008, the association requested that the Pakistan Cricket Board (PCB) lifted its ban on cricketers taking part in the Indian Cricket League (ICL). In November of the same year, the association honoured the Sialkot Stallions for winning Pakistan's domestic Twenty20 competition for the third time. Four years later, the association criticised the PCB's decision on changing the manager of the team.

In March 2021, the president of the association, Malik Zulfiqar, announced that they would boycott the PCB's registration process.
