= Jaffar Nazir =

Pakistani cricketer (born 1977)

Personal information
- Full name: Jaffar Nazir
- Born: 16 August 1977 (age 49); Muridke, Punjab, Pakistan
- Batting: Right-handed
- Bowling: Right-arm fast-medium
- Role: Bowler

Domestic team information
- Years: Team
- 1997/98–1998/99: Rawalpindi
- 1997/98–2013/14: Khan Research Laboratories
- 2000/01–2001/02: Sheikhupura
- 2003/04–2005/06: Sialkot
- 2004/05: Quetta
- 2004/05: Quetta Bears
- 2005/06: Sialkot Stallions
- Last FC: 29 December 2013 Khan Research Laboratories v Zarai Taraqiati Bank Limited
- Last LA: 7 April 2008 Khan Research Laboratories v Sui Northern Gas Pipelines Limited

Career statistics
| Competition | First-class | List A |
|---|---|---|
| Matches | 134 | 70 |
| Runs scored | 2141 | 473 |
| Batting average | 14.66 | 16.31 |
| 100s/50s | 0/4 | 0/0 |
| Top score | 80 | 40 |
| Balls bowled | 23309 | 3286 |
| Wickets | 505 | 81 |
| Bowling average | 22.82 | 33.07 |
| 5 wickets in innings | 31 | 1 |
| 10 wickets in match | 2 | 0 |
| Best bowling | 8/40 | 5/30 |
| Catches/stumpings | 35/– | 16/– |
- Source: ESPNcricinfo, 5 July 2026

Jaffar Nazir (born 16 August 1977) is a Pakistani former cricketer who played as a right-arm fast-medium bowler. He played 134 first-class and 70 List A matches between the 1997/98 and 2013/14 seasons, taking 505 first-class wickets.

Nazir played most of his domestic cricket for Khan Research Laboratories (KRL). During his career, he also represented Rawalpindi, Sheikhupura, Sialkot, and Quetta, and appeared for sides including Pakistan A, Quetta Bears and Sialkot Stallions.

In January 2002, while playing for Sheikhupura, Nazir claimed a hat-trick against Rest of Punjab in the Quaid-e-Azam Trophy. He also scored 64 in Sheikhupura's first innings in the same match.

Nazir enjoyed one of his strongest domestic seasons in 2002–03. He finished as the leading wicket-taker in the 2002–03 Quaid-e-Azam Trophy, with 44 wickets, and in the final against Pakistan International Airlines he took 7 wickets for 104 runs in the first innings.

In November 2010, playing for KRL against Peshawar, Nazir recorded career best innings figures of 8 for 40 and match figures of 12 for 107 in a five-wicket victory.
