= Khalil Ahmed (cricketer) =

Afghan cricketer (born 2004)

Personal information
- Born: 21 December 2004 (age 21); Khost, Afghanistan
- Batting: Right-handed
- Bowling: Right-arm medium-fast
- Role: Bowler

Domestic team information
- Years: Team
- 2022: Kabul Eagles
- 2022/23–2024: Band-e-Amir Region
- 2024: Mah-e-Par Stars
- 2024: Band-e-Amir Dragons

Career statistics
| Competition | FC | LA | T20 |
|---|---|---|---|
| Matches | 6 | 7 | 10 |
| Runs scored | 43 | 7 | 0 |
| Batting average | 10.75 | 2.33 | – |
| 100s/50s | 0/0 | 0/0 | 0/0 |
| Top score | 26 | 5 | 0* |
| Balls bowled | 1,081 | 312 | 199 |
| Wickets | 20 | 3 | 12 |
| Bowling average | 30.60 | 134.66 | 21.41 |
| 5 wickets in innings | 0 | 0 | 0 |
| 10 wickets in match | 0 | 0 | 0 |
| Best bowling | 4/63 | 2/71 | 4/25 |
| Catches/stumpings | 3/– | 1/– | 0/– |
- Source: Cricinfo, 26 January 2025

Khalil Ahmed (born 21 December 2004) is an Afghan cricketer. In domestic cricket, he plays for the Band-e-Amir Dragons. He also played for Afghanistan under-19 cricket team in the 2022 and 2024 Under-19 Cricket World Cup.

== Career ==
He made his first-class debut for Band-e-Amir Region against Amo Region in the 2022 Ahmad Shah Abdali 4-day Tournament on 26 October 2022. He made his Twenty20 debut for Kabul Eagles against Mis Ainak Knights in the 2022 Shpageeza Cricket League on 22 July 2022. He made his List A debut for Junior Champions against Pamir Legends in the Green Afghanistan One Day Cup on 30 April 2023.

In September 2024, he was named in Afghanistan's squad for the one-off Test match against New Zealand.
