= Khaqan Arsal =

Pakistani cricketer (born 1984)

Personal information
- Born: 10 December 1984 (age 41); Lahore, Pakistan
- Source: Cricinfo, 27 November 2015

Khaqan Arsal (born 10 December 1984) is a Pakistani first-class cricketer who played for Lahore cricket team.
