= Mohammad Naved (cricketer) =

Pakistani cricketer (born 1988)

Personal information
- Full name: Mohammad Naved
- Born: 1 September 1988 (age 38); Lahore, Punjab, Pakistan
- Batting: Right-handed
- Bowling: Right-arm fast-medium
- Role: Bowler

Domestic team information
- Years: Team
- 2007/08–2009/10: Lahore Shalimar
- 2007/08–2009/10: Lahore Lions
- 2008/09–2009/10: Lahore Eagles
- 2010/11–2014/15: State Bank of Pakistan
- FC debut: 19 November 2007 Lahore Shalimar v Rawalpindi
- Last FC: 3 December 2014 State Bank of Pakistan v Habib Bank Limited
- LA debut: 20 March 2008 Lahore Lions v Khan Research Laboratories
- Last LA: 1 February 2015 State Bank of Pakistan v National Bank of Pakistan

Career statistics
Competition	First-class	List A	Twenty20
Matches	53	39	9
Runs scored	461	182	7
Batting average	9.03	10.70	7.00
100s/50s	0/1	0/0	0/0
Top score	75	29*	7*
Balls bowled	10951	1831	169
Wickets	218	49	11
Bowling average	26.10	32.61	18.81
5 wickets in innings	15	0	0
10 wickets in match	2	0	0
Best bowling	8/128	4/41	3/33
Catches/stumpings	15/–	10/–	4/–
- Source: ESPNCricinfo, 5 July 2026

Mohammad Naved (born 1 September 1988) is a Pakistani former cricketer. Naved was a right-handed batter who bowled right-arm fast-medium. He was born in Lahore, Punjab.

Naved made his first-class debut for Lahore Shalimar against Rawalpindi in the 2007–08 Quaid-e-Azam Trophy on 19 November 2007. He made his List A debut for Lahore Lions against Khan Research Laboratories in the 2007–08 ABN-AMRO Cup on 20 March 2008, and made his Twenty20 debut for Lahore Eagles against Karachi Dolphins in the 2008–09 RBS Twenty-20 Cup on 4 October 2008.

During his domestic career, Naved represented Lahore Shalimar, Lahore Lions, Lahore Eagles and State Bank of Pakistan. He also represented Pakistan Under-19s and Pakistan A, and appeared for Bahawalpur Stags, Railways and Dewan Farooq Motor Limited.

Naved established himself as a successful seam bowler in domestic cricket. In January 2009, playing for Lahore Shalimar in the Quaid-e-Azam Trophy, he took seven wickets against Khan Research Laboratories, and had taken 15 wickets in his previous two matches. Later that month, he took 5 wickets for 86 runs against Sui Northern Gas Pipelines Limited in another Quaid-e-Azam Trophy match.

In January 2011, playing for State Bank of Pakistan in the Division Two final of the Quaid-e-Azam Trophy, Naved took 7 wickets for 61 runs against Khan Research Laboratories as SBP secured promotion to Division One on first-innings lead.

Naved played 53 first-class, 39 List A and nine Twenty20 matches between the 2007–08 and 2014–15 seasons, taking 218 wickets in first-class cricket.
