= Basharat Ahmad =

Indian politician

Basharat Ahmad (Urdu: بشارت احمد; 1876– 1943), a member of the Lahore Ahmadiyya Movement, was the author of numerous publications about Islam and the Ahmadiyya movement. He was the father of Naseer Ahmad Faruqui and the father in law of Maulana Mohammad Ali.

Basharat Ahmad was born in Dharamsala, India, where he received his early education. He then studied at the King Edward Medical College, Lahore. He served as a doctor in East Africa as well as various cities of the Punjab.

On retirement he settled down in Lahore on the advice of Maulana Mohammad Ali and devoted himself to the cause of Islam.

He was a regular contributor for thirty years to Paigham-i Sulh, the Urdu periodical of the Lahore Ahmadiyya Movement. He is famous for his commentary of the 30th and 27th part of the Quran entitled Anwarul Quran and also for his three volume comprehensive biography, in Urdu, Mujaddid-i Azam, of Mirza Ghulam Ahmad, the founder of the Ahmadiyya Movement.

Prominent Publications by Dr. Basharat Ahmad:

- Anwaar-ul-Quran - Commentary, in Urdu, of Part 27 and 30 of the Quran
- Birth of Jesus — In the Light of the Quran AND In the Light of the Gospels
- The Great Mujaddid (Mujaddid-e-Azam) — 3 Volumes - Biography of Hazrat Mirza Ghulam Ahmad, the Mujadid of the 14th century of Islam and founder of the Ahmadiyya Movement
- Quranic View of Human Freedom
- Taqdir or Pre-Measurement in Islam
- Bashaaraat-e-Ahmadiyya (3 Volumes): A Compilation of Articles on Various Interesting Topics on Islam
- Position of Sufi-ism (Tasawwuf) in Islam
