= Samiullah Jalatzai =

- Arrested: USA
- Citizenship: Afghanistan
- Detained at: Bagram
- Other name
- ISN: 3633

On January 15, 2010, the Department of Defense complied with a court order and published a list of Captives held in the Bagram Theater Internment Facility that included the name Samiullah Jalatzai.

According to the International Press Service he and his brother Sighatullah Jalatzai have had habeas corpus petitions filed on their behalf. Samiullah was apprehended in his home without explanation, in February 2008. His brother Sibghatullah had worked as a translator for the US military, until his unexplained capture in mid-2008.
