= Başarat =

- Location within Azerbaijan
- Coordinates: 39°28′08.7″N 46°43′39.3″E
- Country: Azerbaijan
- District: Qubadli
- Time zone: UTC+4 (AZT)

Başarat (Basharat) is a village in the Qubadli District of Azerbaijan.

== History ==
The village was located in the Armenian-occupied territories surrounding Nagorno-Karabakh, coming under the control of ethnic Armenian forces during the First Nagorno-Karabakh War in August 1993, subsequently becoming part of the breakaway Republic of Artsakh as part of its Kashatagh Province, referred to as Amutegh (Armenian: Ամուտեղ). The village was recaptured by Azerbaijan on November 4, 2020 during the 2020 Nagorno-Karabakh war.
