= Fayyaz Ahmed (Pakistani cricketer) =

Pakistani cricketer (born 1988)

Personal information
- Born: 28 December 1988 (age 37); Islamabad, Pakistan
- Source: Cricinfo, 28 March 2021

Fayyaz Ahmed (born 28 December 1988) is a Pakistani cricketer. He played in 38 first-class and 20 List A matches between 2004 and 2011. He made his Twenty20 debut on 25 April 2005, for Rawalpindi Rams in the 2004–05 National Twenty20 Cup.
