= Ahmed Raza (Pakistani cricketer) =

Pakistani cricketer (born 1983)

Personal information
- Born: 18 March 1983 (age 43); Rahimyar Khan, Pakistan
- Source: Cricinfo, 14 November 2015

Ahmed Raza (born 18 March 1983) is a Pakistani first-class cricketer who played for Multan cricket team.
