= Mohammad Hafeez (cricketer, born 1974) =

Pakistani cricketer (born 1974)

Personal information
- Born: 8 September 1974 (age 52); Okara, Pakistan
- Source: Cricinfo, 14 November 2015

Mohammad Hafeez (born 8 September 1974) is a Pakistani first-class cricketer who played for Multan cricket team.
