= Samiullah Agha =

Pakistani cricketer (born 1981)

Personal information
- Born: 1 January 1981 (age 45); Pishin, Pakistan
- Source: Cricinfo, 14 November 2015

Samiullah Agha (born 1 January 1981) is a Pakistani first-class cricketer who played for Quetta cricket team.
