= Ahmed Zeeshan =

Pakistani cricketer (born 1979)

Personal information
- Born: 26 October 1979 (age 47); Karachi, Pakistan
- Source: Cricinfo, 12 November 2015

Ahmed Zeeshan (born 26 October 1979) is a Pakistani first-class cricketer who played for Karachi cricket team.
