= Shahab Basharat =

Pakistani cricketer (born 1987)

Personal information
- Born: 5 November 1987 (age 39); Lahore, Pakistan
- Source: Cricinfo, 12 November 2015

Shahab Basharat (born 5 November 1987) is a Pakistani first-class cricketer who played for Lahore cricket team.
