= Shakeel Ansar =

Pakistani cricketer (born 1978)

Shakeel Ansar شكيل عنصر
Personal information
- Full name: Shakeel Ansar
- Born: 11 November 1978 (age 48); Sialkot, Punjab, Pakistan
- Batting: Right-handed
- Role: Wicket-keeper

International information
- National side: Pakistan (2012)
- T20I debut (cap 47): 1 June 2012 v Sri Lanka
- Last T20I: 3 June 2012 v Sri Lanka

Domestic team information
- Years: Team
- 1997/98: ZTBL
- 2007–: Sialkot Stallions
- Pakistan Customs
- 2019: Multan Sultans

Career statistics
Competition	T20I	FC	LA	T20
Matches	2	60	45	51
Runs scored	0	1,022	503	461
Batting average	0.00	13.27	20.12	17.07
100s/50s	0/0	0/3	0/2	1/1
Top score	0	57	80*	100*
Catches/stumpings	1/1	182/10	59/10	30/18
- Source: ESPNCricinfo, 10 December 2013

Shakeel Ansar (Punjabi, Urdu: شكيل عنصر; born 11 November 1978) is a Pakistani former first-class cricketer. He is a wicketkeeper-batsman who bats right handed. He has represented Zarai Taraqiati Bank Limited, Pakistan Customs, Khan Research Laboratories; and Sialkot Stallions. He was selected in the national team for the Twenty20 International (T20I) series against Sri Lanka in the 2012 season.

He was the leading run-scorer for Zarai Taraqiati Bank Limited in the 2018–19 Quaid-e-Azam One Day Cup, with 246 runs in five matches.
