= Qaiser Shehzad =

Pakistani cricketer (born 1986)

Personal information
- Born: 1 December 1986 (age 39); Dipalpur, Pakistan
- Source: Cricinfo, 14 November 2015

Qaiser Shehzad (born 1 December 1986) is a Pakistani first-class cricketer who played for Multan cricket team.
