= Suleman Khan (cricketer) =

Pakistani cricketer (born 1983)

Personal information
- Born: 4 June 1983 (age 43); Lahore, Pakistan
- Source: Cricinfo, 12 November 2015

Suleman Khan (born 4 June 1983) is a Pakistani first-class cricketer who played for Lahore cricket team.
