= Maqsood Raza =

Pakistani cricketer (born 1966)

Personal information
- Born: 5 December 1966 (age 59); Lahore, Pakistan
- Batting: Right-handed
- Bowling: Right arm fast medium
- Source: ESPNcricinfo, 19 October 2016

Maqsood Raza (born 5 December 1966) is a Pakistani former cricketer. He played 44 first-class and 26 List A matches for several domestic teams in Pakistan between 1983 and 2003.

== See also ==
- List of Pakistan Automobiles Corporation cricketers
