= Kamran Younis =

Pakistani cricketer (born 1985)

Personal information
- Born: 20 January 1985 (age 41); Gujranwala, Pakistan
- Source: Cricinfo, 12 November 2015

Kamran Younis (born 20 January 1985) is a Pakistani former first-class cricketer who played in 76 first class cricket, 78 List A cricket, and 19 Twenty20 cricket matches between 1999 and 2016.
