= Anis Siddiqi =

Pakistani cricketer and umpire

Personal information
- Full name: Anis Siddiqi
- Born: 11 April 1959 (age 67); Lahore, Punjab, Pakistan
- Batting: Right-handed
- Bowling: Leg break

Career statistics
| Competition | First-class | List A |
|---|---|---|
| Matches | 23 | 5 |
| Runs scored | 689 | 52 |
| Batting average | 18.13 | 10.40 |
| 100s/50s | 0/3 | 0/0 |
| Top score | 79 | 32 |
| Balls bowled | 1,256 | 65 |
| Wickets | 13 | 0 |
| Bowling average | 53.15 | – |
| 5 wickets in innings | 0 | 0 |
| 10 wickets in match | 0 | 0 |
| Best bowling | 2/38 | – |
| Catches/stumpings | 13/– | 1/– |
- Source: Cricinfo, 14 April 2026

Anis Siddiqi (born 11 April 1959) is a Pakistani former cricketer and umpire. Siddiqi was a right-handed batsman who bowled leg break. He was born in Lahore, Punjab.

Siddiqi played Pakistani domestic cricket for Lahore, Pakistan Universities and Punjab. He played 23 first-class matches, scoring 689 runs at a batting average of 18.13, with 3 half-centuries and a highest score of 79. With the ball, he took 13 wickets at a bowling average of 53.15, with best figures of 2 for 38. In 5 List A matches, he scored 52 runs with a highest score of 32.

After his playing career, Siddiqi became an umpire. He stood in 17 first-class matches, 15 List A matches and 6 Twenty20 matches, and also officiated in 1 Under-19 One Day International.

In April 2013, the Pakistan Cricket Board banned Siddiqi for three years after an inquiry into an integrity case arising from a television sting operation.
