= Lahore City Cricket Association Ground =

Cricket Ground in Pakistan

- LCCA Ground
- Interactive map of Lahore City Cricket Association Ground

Ground information
- Location: Lahore, Punjab, Pakistan
- Country: Pakistan
- Coordinates: 31.512901216653297°N 74.33598141042009°E
- Establishment: 1980; 46 years ago
- Owner: Lahore Regional Cricket Association
- Operator: Lahore Regional Cricket Association
- Tenants: Lahore City Cricket Association

International information
- First women's ODI: 9 April 2025: Scotland v West Indies
- Last women's ODI: 19 April 2025: Pakistan v Bangladesh
- As of 19 April 2025; Source: ESPNcricinfo

The Lahore City Cricket Association Ground (formerly known as Punjab Cricket Association Ground) is a cricket ground located opposite the Gaddafi Stadium in Lahore, Pakistan. This ground is used for domestic first-class cricket, List A cricket, and Twenty20 cricket matches, as well as for women's One Day Internationals. Moreover, around ten cricket clubs also use the ground.

From 1980 to November 2012, 265 first-class cricket matches, 105 List A cricket matches, and 12 Twenty20 cricket matches were played on this ground. The ground has also hosted 7 WODIs as of mid-April 2025.

== Development and ownership ==
In 2002, the Pakistan Cricket Board spent more than Rs. 3 million on the upgradation of LCCA Ground as part of PCB Vision-2005. The project envisaged the club pavilion renovation, the building of the umpires' room and various other facilities, a total re-laying of the field, the establishment of a tube well, and the construction of an iron fence around the perimeter.

In October 2012, it was announced by the Lahore City Cricket Association that the floodlights would be installed there to develop a new culture of night cricket in the city.

In February 2021, the control of the ground was transferred from the Lahore City Cricket Association to the Pakistan Cricket Board, following the disbandment of all city associations across the country.

== Tournaments hosted ==
In 2012, the Pakistan Cricket Board decided to stage the 2012–13 Faysal Bank T20 Cup in Lahore between December 1 and 9, 2012. The tournament was played on three different grounds of Lahore which included Gaddafi Stadium, Bagh-e-Jinnah, and Lahore City Cricket Association Ground. Lahore City Cricket Association Ground hosted 14 Twenty20 cricket matches.

In 2024, the ground hosted all 21 matches of the National Women's U19 T20 Tournament 2024/25.

In 2025, the ground was one of the two hosts (along with the Gaddafi Stadium) for the 2025 Women's Cricket World Cup Qualifier, with the ground hosting seven of the fifteen matches.

== See also ==
- List of cricket grounds in Pakistan
- Gaddafi Stadium
