= Kashif Raza =

Pakistani cricketer

Personal information
- Full name: Kashif Raza
- Born: 26 December 1979 (age 46); Sheikhupura, Punjab, Pakistan
- Batting: Right-handed
- Bowling: Right-arm medium
- Role: Bowler

International information
- National side: Pakistan (2001)
- Only ODI: 13 April 2001 v Sri Lanka

Domestic team information
- Years: Team
- 2000/01: Sheikhupura
- 2003/04–2005/06: Hyderabad
- 2004/05–2005/06: Hyderabad Hawks
- 2006/07: Sialkot
- 2006/07: Punjab
- 2006/07–2008/09: Sialkot Stallions
- 2008/09–2011/12: WAPDA

Career statistics
| Competition | ODI | First-class | List A | Twenty20 |
|---|---|---|---|---|
| Matches | 1 | 104 | 74 | 10 |
| Runs scored | 2 | 1,394 | 223 | 28 |
| Batting average | – | 13.66 | 9.29 | 28.00 |
| 100s/50s | 0/0 | 0/2 | 0/0 | 0/0 |
| Top score | 2* | 64* | 24 | 20* |
| Balls bowled | 30 | 16,565 | 3,594 | 215 |
| Wickets | 1 | 353 | 106 | 8 |
| Bowling average | 36.00 | 22.99 | 25.24 | 28.00 |
| 5 wickets in innings | 0 | 17 | 1 | 0 |
| 10 wickets in match | 0 | 1 | 0 | 0 |
| Best bowling | 1/36 | 8/84 | 5/17 | 3/25 |
| Catches/stumpings | 0/– | 34/– | 9/– | 1/– |
- Source: Cricinfo, 1 May 2026

Kashif Raza (born 26 December 1979) is a Pakistani former cricketer. Raza was a right-handed batsman who bowled right-arm medium. He was born in Sheikhupura, Punjab.

Raza represented Pakistan Under-19s in Youth Test cricket in 1998 and 1998/99 before establishing himself in domestic cricket. He made his first-class debut for Sheikhupura against Lahore Blues in the 2000–01 Quaid-e-Azam Trophy, and took five wickets in Lahore Blues' second innings. He made his List A debut for Sheikhupura against Gujranwala in the 2000–01 One Day Tournament (Associations). He later played domestic cricket for Hyderabad, Hyderabad Hawks, Sialkot, Sialkot Stallions, Punjab and the Water and Power Development Authority, Lahore Division, Pakistan Reserves and REDCO Pakistan.

In the semi-final of the 2000/01 One Day Tournament (Associations), Raza took 4 wickets for 37 runs as Sheikhupura beat Rawalpindi by 68 runs at Lahore. He made his only One Day International appearance for Pakistan against Sri Lanka in the 2000–01 ARY Gold Cup at Sharjah on 13 April 2001. He made his Twenty20 debut for Hyderabad Hawks against Peshawar Panthers in the 2004–05 ABN-AMRO Twenty-20 Cup on 25 April 2005.

Later in his career, Raza played a decisive lower-order innings for WAPDA against Karachi Whites in the 2008–09 Quaid-e-Azam Trophy. After also taking 5 wickets for 44 runs in Karachi Whites' first innings, he made 33 from 31 balls in an unbroken last-wicket stand to seal a one-wicket victory.

Raza played 104 first-class matches. In these, he took 353 wickets at a bowling average of 22.99, with best figures of 8/84 and 17 five-wicket hauls. In 74 List A matches, he took 106 wickets at an average of 25.24, with best figures of 5/17.
