= Imran Nazir (cricketer) =

Pakistani cricketer

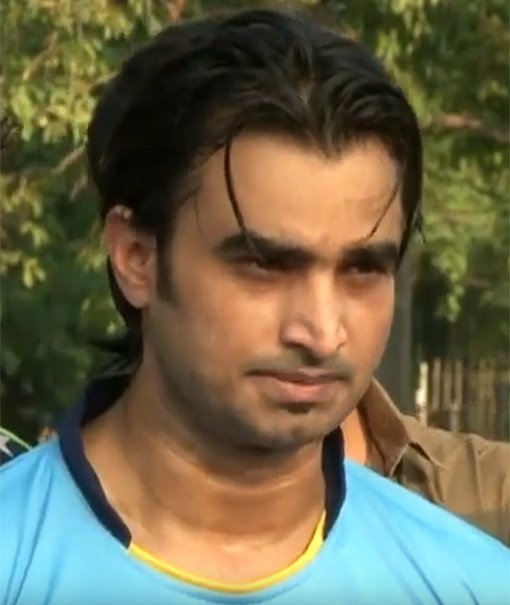

Personal information
- Born: 16 December 1981 (age 44); Gujranwala, Punjab, Pakistan
- Height: 171 cm (5 ft 7 in)
- Batting: Right-handed
- Bowling: Right-arm off-spin
- Role: Opening batter

International information
- National side: Pakistan (1999–2012)
- Test debut (cap 157): 8 March 1999 v Sri Lanka
- Last Test: 11 October 2002 v Australia
- ODI debut (cap 126): 27 March 1999 v Sri Lanka
- Last ODI: 3 October 2009 v New Zealand
- ODI shirt no.: 16
- T20I debut (cap 13): 2 February 2007 v South Africa
- Last T20I: 4 October 2012 v Sri Lanka
- T20I shirt no.: 16

Domestic team information
- Years: Team
- 1998/99: Water and Power Authority
- 1999/00–2007/08: National Bank of Pakistan
- 2000/01: Sheikhupura
- 2003/04–2006/07: Sialkot
- 2004/05–2013/14: Sialkot Stallions
- 2006/07: Punjab
- 2008/09–2013/14: Zarai
- 2009/10: Dhaka Division
- 2011/12: Dhaka Gladiators
- 2012: Nagenahira Nagas
- 2019: Lahore Qalandars

Career statistics
Competition	Test	ODI	T20I	FC
Matches	8	79	25	139
Runs scored	427	1,895	500	7,172
Batting average	32.84	24.61	21.73	33.20
100s/50s	2/1	2/9	0/3	10/44
Top score	131	160	72	185
Balls bowled	–	49	–	842
Wickets	–	1	–	11
Bowling average	–	48.00	–	58.00
5 wickets in innings	–	0	–	0
10 wickets in match	–	0	–	0
Best bowling	–	1/3	–	3/61
Catches/stumpings	4/–	26/–	11/–	105/–
- Source: ESPNcricinfo, 8 May 2017

Imran Nazir (Punjabi: عمران نذیر) (born 16 December 1981) is a Pakistani former cricketer who played for the Pakistan national cricket team between 1999 and 2012 and was widely known to be a hard hitting opening batter.

== Early life ==
Imran Nazir was born in Gujranwala, Punjab, Pakistan. As a youngster, Nazir says he admired many Pakistan stars but his first true cricketing idol was his elder brother Mushtaq, who guided him through lean spells and repeatedly reassured him. Like most kids of his generation he dominated street cricket, so by the time he played his first proper match at ten he already felt comfortable expressing himself with the bat. His first overseas stint came at 17 with Great Horton in England's Bradford Cricket League, an experience that accelerated his development as he adjusted from Pakistani pitches to very different English conditions.

== Franchise career ==
=== Indian Cricket League ===
In 2008, Nazir signed for the Indian Cricket League and played for the Lahore Badshahs. He scored 111 runs not out, off just 44 deliveries, against the Hyderabad Heroes in the third of the best of three finals of the tournament and helped his team achieve victory and lift the trophy. Another, earlier of his notable performances in the ICL was when he blitzed an unbeaten 83 off 38 balls, propelling Lahore Badshahs to 141/2 in 13.2 overs and an eight-wicket win over Mumbai Champs (who had made 140/5). His powerplay surge effectively settled the chase long before the finish.

After signing up for the Indian Cricket League, his chances of ever playing again for Pakistan looked slim. However, on 2 February 2009, a Pakistani court suspended the ban on Indian Cricket League players, which paved the way for Nazir to make a return to international cricket.

=== Other leagues and tournaments ===
Nazir has played two National T20 cups with Sialkot Stallions, and he was instrumental in his team winning the second edition in 2005–06, being the top-scorer from his team in the final against Karachi Dolphins with 46 off 31 balls including seven fours and a six.

He was selected for the Hong Kong Sixes tournament 2010 in Hong Kong as a member of the Pakistani squad. The final match, which was in Pakistan's favour, was lost due to Imran Nazir's bowling. 46 runs were required from the last 8-ball over but Imran Nazir gave away 48 runs in 7 balls. In Twenty20 games he has a bowling average of 1.00 and in his 8 deliveries he has 3 wickets a strike rate of less than 3.

He has also played for Dhaka Dynamites in Bangladesh's NCL T20 Bangladesh. He has played for Dhaka Gladiators in Bangladesh Premier League (BPL). He has played 7 matches in BPL and has scored 207 runs with an average of 41.4 runs per game. He has a strike rate of 150. His highest score is 58 and he has scored 2 half centuries in this tournament and has hit twenty one 4s and nine 6s.

He has played for Lahore Qalandars in 2018 Abu Dhabi T20 Trophy. He played his last game in 2018.

== International career ==
Nazir made his debut in Test cricket in March 1999 against Sri Lanka at Lahore in Pakistan, and his One Day International debut against the same opposition at Visakhapatnam in India. In June 2010, Imran Nazir reflected that debuting for Pakistan at 17 "did more harm than good," saying his early elevation left him underprepared and contributed to inconsistency later in his career.

He played in 8 Test matches between 1999–2002 and secured a spot in the Pakistan squad since 2002. He also played in One Day International arena, but he could never cement his place in the squad. The emergence of several Pakistan opening batsmen such as Imran Farhat, Mohammad Hafeez, Yasir Hameed, Taufeeq Umar, and Salman Butt kept him out of the national side. However, he displayed excellent cricketing performances in first-class cricket.

=== Early success ===
Writing after Pakistan's win over South Africa in the Coca-Cola Cup final at Sharjah (31 March 2000), in his piece Azam Maqbool Sheikh notes how Pakistan seized the big occasion, led up front by Nazir's rapid half-century in a 123-run opening stand with Shahid Afridi, which set the platform for a defendable total. He also wrote of Nazir that "the good thing about the lad is that he scores quickly without taking undue risks and doesn't fear to attack even against the strong opposition like South Africa. A gifted player like Imran Nazir deserves to be given proper chances, irrespective of his failures, as the boy has all the potential to become one of the finest players in the coming years."

A few months later, during Pakistan's 2000 tour of the West Indies, Nazir struck his maiden Test hundred at Bridgetown in just his second Test, surpassing his debut best of 64 (vs Sri Lanka, Lahore, 1998–99). Aged 18 years 157 days, he became the third-youngest batter to record a maiden Test century, behind Pakistan's Mushtaq Mohammad and India's Sachin Tendulkar. In this second innings of the second match, Nazir had hit 131 at a strike rate of 72 against a pace attack composed of Curtly Ambrose and Courtney Walsh.

In June 2002, in the third ODI of the tour in Australia, Nazir hit 66 off 73 deliveries, with a strike rate of 90, being the top scorer for his team as they'd score 256/7 and win by 91 runs, Australia ending up all out on 165. Nazir had dominated the bowling of Glenn McGrath and Shane Warne.

Following some bad performances, he would plays his last ODIs during the 2004 Asia Cup.

=== Comeback and 2007 World Cups ===
In September 2006, it was reported that Pakistan's revolving door at the top kept Nazir in contention for a recall despite four years out of Tests and more than two years since his last ODI. Fresh from a blazing hundred for Sialkot against Uttar Pradesh in the Mohammad Nissar Trophy at Dharamshala, Nazir said his shoulder fracture was healed and he was "perfectly fine and playing well," targeting a return in both formats. Chief selector Wasim Bari confirmed Nazir was being considered as a replacement for the suspended Inzamam-ul-Haq for the upcoming Champions Trophy in India, praising Nazir's fielding and energy but noting the role mismatch (opener vs middle order) and the complication that Nazir was not in the 30-man probables, which would require ICC approval.

In January 2007, the PCB named a 17-man squad for the five-match ODI series in South Africa and confirmed the recall of opener Imran Nazir. The move aimed to bolster Pakistan's frequently shuffled top order, with selectors citing the need for greater aggression in the powerplay after Nazir's strong domestic form (first-class average of 40.20). His return ended a two-plus-year gap since his last ODI and positioned him as a competing option at the top of the line-up for the away series. He impressed the Pakistan national selectors with his innings of 57 runs from just 33 deliveries, though he struggled to score runs during the rest of the tournament.

Nazir was named in Pakistan's squad for the 2007 World Cup. He scored 160 runs against Zimbabwe in Pakistan's last match during the 2007 Cricket World Cup, after being knocked out by Ireland. It was the second highest score by a Pakistani batter and the eighth highest score by any batter in World Cup history and his 8 sixes equalled the World Cup record of Australian batter, Ricky Ponting. It was also the highest runs he scored in List A cricket.

In September 2007, in the inaugural ICC World Twenty20's semi-final at Cape Town on 22 September 2007, Pakistan chased down 143 with ease, Imran Nazir's 59 off 41 deliveries at the top setting the tempo before the middle order closed out a six-wicket win over New Zealand.

=== Last return and final years ===
In July 2009, PCB chairman Ijaz Butt accepted Imran Nazir's written apology, clearing the opener for national selection again. The pardon effectively drew a line under his disciplinary issues linked to participation in the rebel Indian Cricket League, restoring his eligibility for Pakistan duty.

Having severed ties with the Indian Cricket League, Nazir was recalled to the One Day International and Twenty20 squads for Pakistan's tour of Sri Lanka in August 2009. In November 2009, he scored 58 from 38 balls in a Twenty20 against New Zealand claiming the man of the match award. However, after scores of 4 and 2 against England in early 2010 he was dropped from the side for the World Twenty20.

Nazir was recalled to the Pakistan team in September 2012 for the Twenty20 series against Australia and the following ICC World Twenty20 which was held in Sri Lanka. He scored 153 runs in 6 matches with a reasonable average of 25.50 and with a strike rate of 150.00 which included a match winning innings of 72 off 36 deliveries against Bangladesh. Nazir played his last international cricket in October 2012.

== Personal life ==
Nazir has been married to Amber Hafeez since 2009. While playing league cricket in England he has been described as "a relaxed character with Bollywood looks."

=== Health ===
Nazir suffered a joint problem which had him bedridden for four and a half years. "I couldn't use my hands. I was unable to fully bend my fingers, there was stiffness. If I was to bend my arm, there was a locking of the elbow joint Every joint in my body ached. I couldn't get up, I couldn't lie down, I couldn't sleep", said Nazir. He was able to resume playing cricket in 2018 after receiving stem cell therapy and platelet-rich plasma therapy.

=== Charity ===
In May 2011, Nazir made a surprise guest appearance at a charity cricket match at Luton Town Football Club between a football legends team and Luton Pakistanis CC. The event was staged to promote community cohesion in the town, as well as raise money for a cancer charity.

== Playing style ==
=== Batting ===
An attacking opening batsman, Nazir was mostly a back foot player known to be particularly lethal through the covers.

According to Cricinfo's Kashif Ahmed:

Imran [Nazir] showed in the tournament he has a great mature head, matched by a wide array of shots and despite being a lanky lad has enough power to clear boundaries. In fact, alongwith Hansie Cronje, he won the joint award for having hit the most sixes. The most positive point of his batting is the fact that he plays straight which explains why he was hard to dismiss. This is unlike most sub-continental batsmen who play wristy shots and tend to play across the line especially towards the legside. Having said that he can play wristy shots and improvise with the wicket.

— Kashif Ahmed, 2000

=== Fielding ===
At a time when Pakistan struggled to modernise outfielding basics, Nazir stood out at backward point, diving, leaping, even cartwheeling to cut off runs, and is often credited as Pakistan's first truly modern ring fielder, borrowing the Jonty Rhodes model of walking in from point and springing either side like a goalkeeper.

== Legacy ==
Writing in 2016 as a reflection on his legacy, Hassan Cheema argues that, by 19, Imran Nazir already had a Test hundred in the West Indies and three fifties in seven ODIs against South Africa, prompting hopes he was Pakistan's long-sought answer at the top: an opener who could handle high pace and, unusually for that era, a modern in-ring fielder. He also possessed the kind of aesthetic fluency rare among Pakistan's domestic dominators. Yet, as Hassan Cheema says, Nazir may have peaked early; by that age he had played half his Tests and over a third of his ODIs; he would add only two more international hundreds, average under 25 in ODIs, and nevertheless become a cult figure. His explosive displays in the Indian Cricket League and domestic cricket inflated the legend, even as his international game seemed to stall.

In a 2022 contribution, Cheema highlights how Nazir anticipated the modern T20 era: calling him the lynchpin of Pakistan's 2007 T20 World Cup side, he argues that Nazir might have had a very different career in today's franchise era; with his career T20 strike rate just under 150 screams modern T20 opener and would likely have made him a globe-trotting pick. While many of his runs came in the lower-standard ICL and Pakistan domestic circuit, Cheema notes that even at international level Nazir's method worked: up to 2010, only Yuvraj Singh and Andrew Symonds had scored more T20I runs at a higher strike rate.
