= Mohammad Ayub (cricketer) =

Pakistani cricketer

Personal information
- Full name: Mohammad Ayub Dogar
- Born: 13 September 1979 (age 47); Nankana Sahib, Punjab, Pakistan
- Batting: Right-handed
- Bowling: Right-arm off break
- Role: Batsman

International information
- National side: Pakistan (2012)
- Only Test (cap 209): 22 June 2012 v Sri Lanka

Domestic team information
- Years: Team
- 2001/02: Punjab
- 2007–: Sialkot Stallions

Career statistics
Competition	Test	FC	LA	T20
Matches	1	115	71	10
Runs scored	47	7,096	1,150	176
Batting average	23.50	41.98	26.74	19.55
100s/50s	0/0	18/36	1/6	0/1
Top score	25	200	108	62
Balls bowled	–	1,118	471	–
Wickets	–	16	10	–
Bowling average	–	44.06	48.30	–
5 wickets in innings	–	0	0	–
10 wickets in match	–	0	0	–
Best bowling	–	2/2	3/33	–
Catches/stumpings	1/–	83/–	25/–	3/–
- Source: ESPNCricinfo, 11 May 2012

Mohammad Ayub Dogar (Urdu: محمدايوب; born 13 September 1979) is a Pakistani former cricketer who played for the Pakistan national cricket team.

He has represented Punjab and the Sialkot Stallions. He has selected for the Test series against Sri Lanka in the 2012 season, playing his only Test against the Sri Lankans on 22 June 2012.
