= Qaiser Abbas =

Pakistani cricketer (born 1982)

Personal information
- Full name: Qaiser Abbas
- Born: 7 May 1982 (age 44); Farooqabad, Punjab, Pakistan
- Batting: Left-handed
- Bowling: Slow left-arm orthodox
- Role: All rounder

International information
- National side: Pakistan
- Only Test (cap 162): 15 November 2000 v England

Domestic team information
- Years: Team
- 1999/00–2017/18: National Bank of Pakistan
- 2000/01–2001/02: Sheikhupura
- 2003/04–2012/13: Sialkot Stallions
- 2009/10: Rajshahi Rangers
- 2011/12: Duronto Rajshahi

Career statistics
Competition	Test	First-class
Matches	1	174
Runs scored	2	8,224
Batting average	2.00	35.29
100s/50s	0/0	13/42
Top score	2	168
Balls bowled	96	11,226
Wickets	0	148
Bowling average	–	29.87
5 wickets in innings	–	2
10 wickets in match	–	0
Best bowling	–	5/20
Catches/stumpings	0/–	87/–
- Source: ESPNCricinfo, 11 September 2022

Qaiser Abbas (born 7 May 1982) is a Pakistani cricketer who played in one Test match in 2000. He has played first-class cricket, mostly for National Bank of Pakistan, since 1999. He has also played for Rajshahi Rangers in the Bangladesh T20 competition.
