= Gujranwala cricket team =

Cricket team

Gujranwala cricket team, from the city of Gujranwala in Gujranwala District in the east of Punjab province, played in Pakistan's domestic first-class cricket competitions from 1983–84 to 1986–87, and from 1997–98 to 2002–03.

== 1980s ==
For the 1983–84 season the Pakistan Cricket Board expanded the BCCP Patron's Trophy, and Gujranwala were one of several new teams to play at first-class level. Over the next four seasons they played 13 matches, winning two, losing six and drawing five.

Both their victories were against Lahore Division, in 1984-85 and 1985–86. In the 1985–86 victory, by an innings and 41 runs, Farhat Masood had match figures of 10 for 56 (6 for 37 and 4 for 19), which remained Gujranwala's best bowling figures for a match.

The Pakistan Cricket Board decided to cut back the number of first-class matches for the 1987–88 season, and Gujranwala returned to sub-first-class level.

== 1990s and 2000s ==
Gujranwala won the second division (non-first-class) of the Quaid-i-Azam Trophy in 1996–97, and were promoted to the first-class level of the Trophy in 1997–98. Over the next six seasons they played 50 matches, winning 12, losing 16 and drawing 22. Their best season was 2001–02, when they won four of their eight matches and finished second out of the nine teams in Pool A of the Trophy.

Overall, from 1983–84 to 2002–03, Gujranwala played 63 first-class matches, with 14 wins, 22 losses and 27 draws.

== Current status ==
Gujranwala were one of six regional teams that were absorbed by stronger teams for the 2003–04 season. Along with Sheikhupura, they merged with the neighbouring Sialkot team. Over the next six seasons Sialkot won the Quaid-i-Azam Trophy twice and finished second twice.

Gujranwala continue to play at sub-first-class level. Currently they take part in the Inter-District Senior Tournament, a three-day national competition, playing other teams from the Sialkot region.

== Individual records ==
Gujranwala's highest individual score was 201 not out (off 276 balls) by Zahid Fazal in an innings victory over Hyderabad in 1998–99. The best innings bowling figures were 7 for 100 by Tahir Mughal against Karachi Whites, also in 1998–99.

== Grounds ==
Gujranwala's home matches have always been played at Jinnah Stadium in Gujranwala (known as Municipal Stadium until the 1990s). This stadium has the capacity to accommodate up to 20,000 spectators.

== Other sources ==
- Wisden Cricketers' Almanack 1985 to 2004
