= Sialkot cricket team =

Pakistani cricket team

- One Day name: Sialkot Stallions

Personnel
- Captain: Babar Azam
- Coach: Mansoor Amjad

Team information
- Founded: 2002
- Home ground: Jinnah Stadium (Sialkot)
- Capacity: 25,000

History
- First-class debut: Sheikhupura in 2002 at Lahore Country Club
- Quaid-e-Azam Trophy wins: 3
- National T20 Cup wins: 5

The Sialkot cricket team is a cricket team from the city of Sialkot in Punjab, Pakistan.

Sialkot competed in Pakistan's domestic first-class competitions from 2001–02 to 2013–14, winning the Quaid-e-Azam Trophy in 2005–06 and 2008–09. It returned to first-class cricket when the Quaid-e-Azam Trophy competition was revamped in 2024–25, when it remained undefeated throughout the tournament and won the final by one wicket. The team play their home matches at Jinnah Stadium in Sialkot. At the end of the 2024–25 Quaid-e-Azam Trophy, Sialkot had played 135 first-class matches, winning 49, losing 38, and drawing 48.

In the shorter formats of the game, the team used the name Sialkot Stallions and enjoyed great success, winning six national Twenty20 titles. They also hold the record for the most consecutive wins in domestic Twenty20 cricket, with their 25-match winning streak stretching from 24 February 2006 to 10 October 2010.

Noted players to have represented Sialkot include Imran Nazir, Shoaib Malik, Naved-ul-Hasan and Mohammad Asif.

== Honours ==
=== Quaid-e-Azam Trophy ===
- 2005–06
- 2008–09
- 2024–25

=== National T20 Cup ===
- 2005–06
- 2006–07
- 2008–09
- 2009
- 2009–10
- 2011–12
