= 2012–13 National One Day Cup =

Cricket competition in Pakistan

- Dates: Tuesday, 5 March – Friday, 22 March
- Administrator: Pakistan Cricket Board
- Cricket format: List A cricket
- Tournament format: Round Robin
- Host: Pakistan
- Champions: Lahore Lions and Karachi Zebras
- Participants: 14
- Matches: 45
- Most runs: Sohaib Maqsood (475 runs)
- Most wickets: Bilawal Bhatti (14 wickets)

The Faysal Bank One Day Cup (aka National One-day Championship) is the premier List A cricket domestic competition in Pakistan, which was held from 5 to 22 March 2013.

== Venue ==
Locations of teams in 2013 Faysal Bank One Day Cup

== Fixtures and results ==
All times shown are in Pakistan Standard Time (UTC+05).

=== Group stage ===
==== Group A ====
Points Table

| Team | Pld | W | L | NR | NRR | Pts |
|---|---|---|---|---|---|---|
| Sialkot Stallions | 6 | 5 | 1 | 0 | +0.822 | 10 |
| Karachi Dolphins | 6 | 4 | 2 | 0 | +1.309 | 8 |
| Multan Tigers | 6 | 4 | 2 | 0 | +0.934 | 8 |
| Hyderabad Hawks | 6 | 3 | 3 | 0 | +0.724 | 6 |
| Lahore Eagles | 6 | 2 | 4 | 0 | -1.065 | 4 |
| Quetta Bears | 6 | 2 | 4 | 0 | -1.684 | 4 |
| Bahawalpur Stags | 6 | 1 | 5 | 0 | -0.784 | 2 |

5 March
09:15
Scorecard

| Hyderabad Hawks; 260/2 (50 overs) | v | Quetta Bears; 110 (33.5 overs) |
| Rizwan Ahmed 101* (88); Qaiser Abbas 1/33 (10 overs) | | Taimur Ali 36 (75); Kashif Bhatti 5/30 (7.5 overs) |

Hyderabad Hawks won by 150 runs
Shaheed Mohtarama Benazir Bhutto International Cricket Stadium, Garhi Khuda Bakhsh
Umpires: Kamal Merchant and Riazuddin

- Hyderabad Hawks won the toss and elected to bat
- List A debut: Hamal Wahab (Quetta Bears)
- Hyderabad Hawks 2 points, Quetta Bears 0 points

5 March
09:15
Scorecard

| Karachi Dolphins; 309/3 (50 overs) | v | Lahore Eagles; 206/9 (50 overs) |
| Sarfraz Ahmed 76 (72); Mohammad Salman 2/59 (10 overs) | | Jahangir Mirza 83 (122); Mohammad Sami 3/15 (7 overs) |

Karachi Dolphins won by 103 runs
Niaz Stadium, Hyderabad
Umpires: Raweed Khan and Sajid Afridi

- Lahore Eagles won the toss and elected to field
- List A debuts: Arsalan Arshad and Mohammad Salman (Lahore Eagles)
- Karachi Dolphins 2 points, Lahore Eagles 0 points

5 March
09:15
Scorecard

| Multan Tigers; 266/3 (44.4 overs) | v | Bahawalpur Stags; 264 (49.2 overs) |
| Sohaib Maqsood 82 (96); Ansar Javed 1/33 (7 overs) | | Bilal Khilji 79 (97); Aamer Yamin 5/65 (9.2 overs) |

Multan Tigers won by 7 wickets
Multan Cricket Stadium, Multan
Umpires: Khalid Mahmood and Saleem Badar

- Bahawalpur Stags won the toss and elected to bat
- List A debuts: Faisal Mubashir, Waqas Khan, Zaheer Saddique and Zaka-ul-Rashid (Bahawalpur Stags), Yasir Butt and Zeeshan Ashraf (Multan Tigers)
- Multan Tigers 2 points, Bahawalpur Stags 0 points

7 March
09:15
Scorecard

| Hyderabad Hawks; 199/4 (45.5 overs) | v | Karachi Dolphins; 196/9 (50 overs) |
| Faisal Athar 61* (62); Mohammad Sami 1/32 (9 overs) | | Daniyal Ahsan 66* (94); Rehan Riaz 3/33 (8 overs) |

Hyderabad Hawks won by 6 wickets
Shaheed Mohtarama Benazir Bhutto International Cricket Stadium, Garhi Khuda Bakhsh
Umpires: Raweed Khan and Sajid Afridi

- Karachi Dolphins won the toss and elected to bat
- List A debut: Babar Agha (Karachi Dolphins)
- Hyderabad Hawks 2 points, Karachi Dolphins 0 points

7 March
09:15
Scorecard

| Lahore Eagles; 208 (45.1 overs) | v | Sialkot Stallions; 322/5 (50 overs) |
| Adnan Akmal 85* (76); Mansoor Amjad 2/26 (7.1 overs) | | Mohammad Ayub Dogar 102* (77); Adnan Rasool 3/42 (10 overs) |

Sialkot Stallions won by 114 runs
National Stadium, Karachi
Umpires: Kamal Merchant and Riazuddin

- Sialkot Stallions won the toss and elected to bat
- List A debut: Mohammad Waleed (Lahore Eagles)
- Sialkot Stallions 2 points, Lahore Eagles 0 points

7 March
09:15
Scorecard

| Multan Tigers; 171/3 (29.2 overs) | v | Quetta Bears; 170/9 (50 overs) |
| Sohaib Maqsood 48 (44); Qaiser Abbas 1/12 (5 overs) | | Ali Asad 81 (103); Kashif Naved 3/19 (7 overs) |

Multan Tigers won by 7 wickets
Niaz Stadium, Hyderabad
Umpires: Khalid Mahmood and Saleem Badar

- Quetta Bears won the toss and elected to bat
- Multan Tigers 2 points, Quetta Bears 0 points

9 March
09:15
Scorecard

| Bahawalpur Stags; 145/4 (31.5 overs) | v | Quetta Bears; 144 (49 overs) |
| Imranullah Aslam 93 (88); Nazar Hussain 1/26 (8 overs) | | Abid Ali 48 (110); Faisal Elahi 4/31 (9 overs) |

Bahawalpur Stags won by 6 wickets
National Stadium, Karachi
Umpires: Riazuddin and Saleem Badar

- Bahawalpur Stags won the toss and elected to field
- List A debut: Fareed-ud-din (Quetta Bears)
- Bahawalpur Stags 2 points, Quetta Bears 0 points

9 March
09:15
Scorecard

| Hyderabad Hawks; 237 (50 overs) | v | Lahore Eagles; 241/6 (48 overs) |
| Rizwan Ahmed 73 (91); Adnan Rasool 4/38 (10 overs) | | Sami Aslam 71 (82); Rehan Riaz 2/17 (4 overs) |

Lahore Eagles won by 4 wickets
Niaz Stadium, Hyderabad
Umpires: Raweed Khan and Sajid Afridi

- Hyderabad Hawks won the toss and elected to bat
- Lahore Eagles 2 points, Hyderabad Hawks 0 points

9 March
09:15
Scorecard

| Multan Tigers; 234 (49.2 overs) | v | Sialkot Stallions; 235/5 (45.1 overs) |
| Sohaib Maqsood 91 (104); Bilawal Bhatti 2/26 (10 overs) | | Mansoor Amjad 103* (100); Aamer Yamin 2/40 (7 overs) |

Sialkot Stallions won by 5 wickets
Shaheed Mohtarama Benazir Bhutto International Cricket Stadium, Garhi Khuda Bakhsh
Umpires: Kamal Merchant and Khalid Mahmood

- Multan Tigers won the toss and elected to bat
- Sialkot Stallions 2 points, Multan Tigers 0 points

11 March
09:15
Scorecard

| Hyderabad Hawks; 290 (48.5 overs) | v | Bahawalpur Stags; 164 (38.2 overs) |
| Faisal Athar 68 (52); Zeeshan Khalid 5/44 (7.5 overs) | | Hammad Tariq 45 (58); Nasir Awais 3/17 (7.2 overs) |

Hyderabad Hawks won by 126 runs
Niaz Stadium, Hyderabad
Umpires: Raweed Khan and Sajid Afridi

- Hyderabad Hawks won the toss and elected to bat
- List A debut: Shahan Akram (Bahawalpur Stags)
- Hyderabad Hawks 2 points, Bahawalpur Stags 0 points

11 March
09:15
Scorecard

| Karachi Dolphins; 165 (40.3 overs) | v | Sialkot Stallions; 179 (45.4 overs) |
| Shahzaib Hasan 31 (45); Mansoor Amjad 31 (45) | | Shahid Yousuf 49 (72); Fawad Alam 3/30 (9.4 overs) |

Sialkot Stallions won by 14 runs
Shaheed Mohtarama Benazir Bhutto International Cricket Stadium, Garhi Khuda Bakhsh
Umpires: Ghaffar Kazmi and Nadeem Iqbal

- Sialkot Stallions won the toss and elected to bat
- Sialkot Stallions 2 points, Karachi Dolphins 0 points

11 March
09:15
Scorecard

| Lahore Eagles; 260/9 (50 overs) | v | Quetta Bears; 263/8 (49.1 overs) |
| Jahangir Mirza 59 (71); Nazar Hussain 3/57 (10 overs) | | Bismillah Khan 67 (66); Mohammad Irshad 3/46 (10 overs) |

Quetta Bears won by 2 wickets
Municipal Sports Complex, Mirpur Khas
Umpires: Akmal Hayat and Kamal Merchant

- Quetta Bears won the toss and elected to field
- List A debut: Farhan Khan (Quetta Bears)
- Quetta Bears 2 points, Lahore Eagles 0 points

13 March
09:15
Scorecard

| Hyderabad Hawks; 314/6 (50 overs) | v | Multan Tigers; 315/4 (47.2 overs) |
| Sharjeel Khan 86 (76); Saeed Anwar 2/47 (8 overs) | | Kashif Naved 98* (74); Mir Ali 1/36 (6 overs) |

Multan Tigers won by 6 wickets
Niaz Stadium, Hyderabad
Umpires: Akmal Hayat and Qaiser Waheed

- Multan Tigers won the toss and elected to field
- List A debuts: Adeel Hanif and Mohammad Azeem (Multan Tigers)
- Multan Tigers 2 points, Hyderabad Hawks 0 points

13 March
09:15
Scorecard

| Karachi Dolphins; 93/0 (6.2 overs) | v | Bahawalpur Stags; 91 (20 overs) |
| Shahzaib Hasan 53 (22) | | Ansar Javed 17 (12); Atif Maqbool 3/17 (4 overs) |

Karachi Dolphins won by 10 wickets
Shaheed Mohtarama Benazir Bhutto International Cricket Stadium, Garhi Khuda Bakhsh
Umpires: Ghaffar Kazmi and Nadeem Iqbal

- Bahawalpur Stags won the toss and elected to bat
- List A debuts: Arshad Fareed and Mohammad Wasim (Bahawalpur Stags)
- Karachi Dolphins 2 points, Bahawalpur Stags 0 points

13 March
09:15
Scorecard

| Quetta Bears; 179/9 (47.1 overs) | v | Sialkot Stallions; 176 (48.5 overs) |
| Abid Ali 39 (88); Adeel Malik 3/39 (10 overs) | | Ali Khan 51* (71); Shahzad Tareen 3/28 (10 overs) |

Quetta Bears won by 1 wicket
Municipal Sports Complex, Mirpur Khas
Umpires: Khalid Mahmood and Riazuddin

- Quetta Bears won the toss and elected chose to field
- Quetta Bears 2 points, Sialkot Stallions 0 points

15 March
09:15
Scorecard

| Bahawalpur Stags; 162 (39.1 overs) | v | Sialkot Stallions; 167/4 (41.2 overs) |
| Hammad Tariq 29 (46); Nabeel Malik 3/42 (10 overs); Adeel Malik 3/42 (10 overs) | | Mohammad Ayub Dogar 66* (87); Kamran Hussain 2/14 (8 overs) |

Sialkot Stallions won by 6 wickets
Shaheed Mohtarama Benazir Bhutto International Cricket Stadium, Garhi Khuda Bakhsh
Umpires: Akmal Hayat and Qaiser Waheed

- Sialkot Stallions won the toss and elected to field
- List A debut Ataullah (Bahawalpur Stags)
- Sialkot Stallions 2 points, Bahawalpur Stags 0 points

15 March
09:15
Scorecard

| Karachi Dolphins; 124/1 (15.3 overs) | v | Quetta Bears; 120 (40.3 overs) |
| Khalid Latif 65* (41); Faizullah 1/68 (53) | | Taimur Ali 36 (73); Atif Maqbool 3/16 (9 overs) |

Karachi Dolphins won by 9 wickets
Niaz Stadium, Hyderabad
Umpires: Ghaffar Kazmi and Nadeem Iqbal

- Karachi Dolphins won the toss and elected to field
- Karachi Dolphins 2 points, Quetta Bears 0 points

15 March
09:15
Scorecard

| Multan Tigers; 175/2 (27.3 overs) | v | Lahore Eagles; 174 (43.3 overs) |
| Sohaib Maqsood 87* (71); Junaid Zia 1/24 (5 overs) | | Mohammad Irshad 69 (79); Rizwan Haider 4/25 (10 overs) |

Multan Tigers won by 8 wickets
Multan Cricket Stadium, Multan
Umpires: Majid Hussain and Saleem Badar

- Multan Tigers won the toss and elected to field
- List A debuts: Abdul Wahab Dar, Asfand Mehran and Waqas Ahmed (jnr) (Lahore Eagles) and Imran Ali (Multan Tigers)
- Multan Tigers 2, Lahore Eagles 0

17 March
09:15
Scorecard

| Bahawalpur Stags; 202/7 (50 overs) | v | Lahore Eagles; 207/3 (47.3 overs) |
| Mustansar Hussain 54 (68); Asfand Mehran 3/45 (10 overs) | | Jahangir Mirza 55* (77); Faisal Mubashir 1/12 (2 overs) |

Lahore Eagles won by 7 wickets
Shaheed Mohtarama Benazir Bhutto International Cricket Stadium, Garhi Khuda Bakhsh
Umpires: Akmal Hayat and Saleem Badar

- Lahore Eagles won the toss and elected to field
- List A debuts: Nauman Akram and Rafay Ahmed (Bahawalpur Stags)
- Lahore Eagles 2 points, Bahawalpur Stags 0 points

17 March
09:15
Scorecard

| Hyderabad Hawks; 244 (50 overs) | v | Sialkot Stallions; 250/2 (38.3 overs) |
| Kashif Bhatti 53* (37); Bilawal Bhatti 4/59 (10 overs) | | Mansoor Amjad 100* (95); Sharjeel Khan 1/60 (7.3 overs) |

Sialkot Stallions won by 8 wickets
Niaz Stadium, Hyderabad
Umpires: Nadeem Iqbal and Qaiser Waheed

- Sialkot Stallions won the toss and elected to field
- Sialkot Stallions 2 points, Hyderabad Hawks 0 points

17 March
09:15
Scorecard

| Multan Tigers; 346/7 (50 overs) | v | Karachi Dolphins; 349/5 (48.5 overs) |
| Sohaib Maqsood 156 (95); Wajid Ali 2/28 (4 overs) | | Shahzaib Hasan 135 (106); Saeed Anwar jnr 4/62 (10 overs) |

Karachi Dolphins won by 5 wickets
Multan Cricket Stadium, Multan
Umpires: Ghaffar Kazmi and Majid Hussain

- Karachi Dolphins won the toss and elected to field
- List A debut: Usman Liaqat (Multan Tigers)
- Karachi Dolphins 2 points, Multan Tigers 0 points

==== Group B ====
Points Table Source:Cricinfo

| Team | Pld | W | L | NR | NRR | Pts |
|---|---|---|---|---|---|---|
| Karachi Zebras | 6 | 4 | 0 | 2 | +0.816 | 10 |
| Lahore Lions | 6 | 3 | 2 | 1 | +0.672 | 7 |
| Rawalpindi Rams | 6 | 3 | 2 | 1 | +0.552 | 7 |
| Abbottabad Falcons | 6 | 2 | 3 | 1 | -0.063 | 5 |
| Peshawar Panthers | 6 | 2 | 3 | 1 | -0.479 | 5 |
| Faisalabad Wolves | 6 | 2 | 4 | 0 | -0.832 | 4 |
| Islamabad Leopards | 6 | 1 | 3 | 2 | -0.547 | 4 |

5 March
09:15
Scorecard

| Abbottabad Falcons; 219/9 (50 overs) | v | Peshawar Panthers; 174 (44.1 overs) |
| Khalid Usman 80 (94); Zohaib Khan 4/21 (10 overs) | | Akbar Badshah 35 (40); Khalid Usman 3/31 (9 overs) |

Abbottabad Falcons won by 45 runs
Rawalpindi Cricket Stadium, Rawalpindi
Umpires: Shozab Raza and Zameer Haider

- Abbottabad Falcons won the toss and elected to bat
- List A debuts: Kamran Ghulam and Zeeshan Jadoon (Abbottabad Falcons)
- Abbottabad Falcons 2 points, Peshawar Panthers 0 points

5 March
09:15
Scorecard

| Islamabad Leopards; 272/9 (50 overs) | v | Rawalpindi Rams; 338/7 (50 overs) |
| Babar Azam 101 (114); Yasim Murtaza 3/49 (10 overs) | | Awais Zia 119 (100); Imad Wasim 2/68 (9 overs) |

Rawalpindi Rams won by 66 runs
Diamond Club Ground, Islamabad
Umpires: Ahsan Raza and Akram Raza

- Rawalpindi Rams won the toss and elected to bat
- Rawalpindi Rams 2 points, Islamabad Leopards 0 points

5 March
09:15
Scorecard

| Karachi Zebras; 314/6 (50 overs) | v | Lahore Lions; 222 (44.3 overs) |
| Fakhar Zaman 141 (118); Raza Ali Dar 3/63 (10 overs) | | Azhar Ali 56 (71); Rumman Raees 3/21 (8.3 overs) |

Karachi Zebras won by 92 runs
Mirpur Cricket Stadium, Mirpur
Umpires: Nadeem Iqbal and Saqib Khan

- Lahore Lions won the toss and elected to field
- List A debuts: Imran Butt and Umar Siddiq (Lahore Lions)
- Karachi Zebras 2 points, Lahore Lions 0 points

7 March
09:15
Scorecard

| Faisalabad Wolves; 276 (49.4 overs) | v | Peshawar Panthers; 280/4 (43 overs) |
| Zeeshan Butt 67 (62); Imran Khan 6/48 (8.4 overs) | | Nawaz Ahmed 167 (122); Imran Khalid 3/59 (10 overs) |

Peshawar Panthers won by 6 wickets
Diamond Club Ground, Islamabad
Umpires: Shozab Raza and Zameer Haider

- Faisalabad Wolves won the toss and elected to bat
- Peshawar Panthers 2 points, Faisalabad Wolves 0 points

7 March
09:15
Scorecard

| Islamabad Leopards; 281/7 (50 overs) | v | Karachi Zebras; 318/6 (50 overs) |
| Imad Wasim 72 (54); Azam Hussain 2/46 (10 overs) | | Khurram Manzoor 114 (123); Hamza Nadeem 3/52 (10 overs) |

Karachi Zebras won by 37 runs
Mirpur Cricket Stadium, Mirpur
Umpires: Ahsan Raza and Akram Raza

- Karachi Zebras won the toss and elected to bat
- List A debut: Hamza Nadeem (Islamabad Leopards)
- Karachi Zebras 2 points, Islamabad Leopards 0 points

7 March
09:15
Scorecard

| Rawalpindi Rams; 204 (43.4 overs) | v | Lahore Lions; 277/6 (50 overs) |
| Umar Amin 65 (68); Agha Salman 3/30 (8 overs) | | Fahad-ul-Haq 83 (83); Babar Naeem 2/52 (9 overs) |

Lahore Lions won by 73 runs
Rawalpindi Cricket Stadium, Rawalpindi
Umpires: Aftab Gillani and Majid Hussain

- Lahore Lions won the toss and elected chose to bat
- List A debut: Agha Salman (Lahore Lions)
- Lahore Lions 2 points, Rawalpindi Rams 0 points

9 March
09:15
Scorecard

| Faisalabad Wolves; 180/7 (43 overs) | v | Karachi Zebras; 215 (46 overs) |
| Zeeshan Butt 67* (87); Misbah Khan 2/35 (9 overs) | | Khurram Manzoor 56 (66); Samiullah Khan 3/32 (8 overs) |

Karachi Zebras won by 1 run (D/L method)
Rawalpindi Cricket Stadium, Rawalpindi
Umpires: Akram Raza and Tahir Shah

- Faisalabad Wolves won the toss and elected to field
- List A: debut Abdul Rauf (Faisalabad Wolves)
- Karachi Zebras 2 points, Faisalabad Wolves 0 points

9 March
09:15
Scorecard

| Islamabad Leopards; 275/9 (50 overs) | v | Abbottabad Falcons; 244/9 (47.1 overs) |
| Umair Khan 91* (105); Kamran Ghulam 3/29 (7 overs) | | Yasir Shah 66* (59); Raheel Majeed 3/53 (10 overs) |

Islamabad Leopards won by 20 runs (D/L method)
Diamond Club Ground, Islamabad
Umpires: Ahmed Shahab and Qaiser Waheed

- Islamabad Leopards won the toss and elected to bat
- List A debuts: Fawad Malook (Abbottabad Falcons) and Sajid Ali (Islamabad Leopards)
- Islamabad Leopards 2 points, Abbottabad Falcons 0 points

9 March
09:15
Scorecard

| Lahore Lions; 214 (47.4 overs) | v | Peshawar Panthers; 294/7 (50 overs) |
| Agha Salman 42 (36); Mohammad Adnan 5/46 (10 overs) | | Nawaz Ahmed 93 (103); Aizaz Cheema 5/61 (10 overs) |

Peshawar Panthers won by 80 runs
Gaddafi Stadium, Lahore
Umpires: Aftab Gillani and Majid Hussain

- Peshawar Panthers won the toss and elected to bat
- Peshawar Panthers 2 points, Lahore Lions 0 points

11 March
09:15
Scorecard

| Abbottabad Falcons; 302/5 (50 overs) | v | Rawalpindi Rams; 306/5 (48.1 overs) |
| Mir Azam 134 (113); Sadaf Hussain 2/36 (7 overs) | | Babar Naeem 92 (83); Ikramullah Khan 2/39 (8 overs) |

Rawalpindi Rams won by 5 wickets
Mirpur Cricket Stadium, Mirpur
Umpires: Akram Raza and Tahir Shah

- Abbottabad Falcons won the toss and elected to bat
- Rawalpindi Rams 2 points, Abbottabad Falcons 0 points

11 March
09:15
Scorecard

| Karachi Zebras; 213/4 (45.3 overs) | v | Peshawar Panthers; 210 (47.3 overs) |
| Faisal Iqbal 93* (95); Zohaib Khan 2/39 (9.3 overs) | | Nawaz Ahmed 66 (81); Misbah Khan 4/30 (9 overs) |

Karachi Zebras won by 6 wickets
Rawalpindi Cricket Stadium, Rawalpindi
Umpires: Qaiser Waheed and Zameer Haider

- Karachi Zebras won the toss and elected to field
- List A debut: Fawad Khan (Karachi Zebras)
- Karachi Zebras 2 points, Peshawar Panthers 0 points

11 March
09:15
Scorecard

| Lahore Lions; 195/4 (37.2 overs) | v | Faisalabad Wolves; 191/9 (50 overs) |
| Azhar Ali 84* (109); Khurram Shehzad | | Hasan Mahmood 41 (57); Qaiser Ashraf 3/39 (10 overs) |

Lahore Lions won by 6 wickets
Gaddafi Stadium, Lahore
Umpires: Aftab Gillani and Ehtesham-ul-Haq

- Faisalabad Wolves won the toss and elected to bat
- List A debuts: Munir Ahmed (Faisalabad Wolves), Qaiser Ashraf and Waqas Saleem (Lahore Lions)
- Lahore Lions 2 points, Faisalabad Wolves 0 points

13 March
09:15
Scorecard

| Abbottabad Falcons; 107/2 (14.5 overs) | v | Faisalabad Wolves; 104 (36.2 overs) |
| Mir Azam 54 (33); Samiullah Khan 2/35 (5 overs) | | Zeeshan Butt 17 (28); Yasir Shah 3/10 (9.2 overs) |

Abbottabad Falcons won by 8 wickets
Mirpur Cricket Stadium, Mirpur
Umpires: Ahmed Shahab and Ahsan Raza

- Abbottabad Falcons won the toss and elected to field
- List A debuts: Khalid Kail (Abbottabad Falcons) and Ghulam Dastagir (Faisalabad Wolves)
- Abbottabad Falcons 2, Faisalabad Wolves 0

13 March
09:15
Scorecard

| Lahore Lions | v | Islamabad Leopards |

Match abandoned without a ball bowled
Diamond Club Ground, Islamabad
Umpires: Aftab Gillani and Sajid Afridi

- No toss
- Lahore Lions 1 points, Islamabad Leopards 1 points

13 March
09:15
Scorecard

| Rawalpindi Rams | v | Karachi Zebras |

Match abandoned without a ball bowled
Rawalpindi Cricket Stadium, Rawalpindi
Umpires: Ehtesham-ul-Haq and Tahir Shah

- No toss
- Rawalpindi Rams 1 points, Karachi Zebras 1 points

15 March
09:15
Scorecard

| Abbottabad Falcons | v | Karachi Zebras |

Match abandoned without a ball bowled
Rawalpindi Cricket Stadium, Rawalpindi
Umpires: Ahmed Shahab and Ehtesham-ul-Haq

- No toss
- Abbottabad Falcons 1 points, Karachi Zebras 1 points

15 March
09:15
Scorecard

| Faisalabad Wolves; 229/4 (28 overs) | v | Rawalpindi Rams; 182 (25 overs) |
| Jahandad Khan 76* (36); Hammad Azam 2/31 (3 overs) | | Mohammad Nawaz 60 (41); Samiullah Khan 3/43 (4 overs) |

Faisalabad Wolves won by 47 runs
Mirpur Cricket Stadium, Mirpur
Umpires: Ahsan Raza and Raweed Khan

- Rawalpindi Rams won the toss and elected to field
- Faisalabad Wolves 2 points, Rawalpindi Rams 0 points

15 March
09:15
Scorecard

| Islamabad Leopards | v | Peshawar Panthers |

Match abandoned without a ball bowled
Diamond Club Ground, Islamabad
Umpires: Akram Raza and Tahir Shah

- No toss
- Islamabad Leopards 1 points, Peshawar Panthers 1 points

17 March
09:15
Scorecard

| Abbottabad Falcons; 130 (35 overs) | v | Lahore Lions; 327/7 (50 overs) |
| Rameez Ahmed 30 (46); Raza Ali Dar 2/14 (4 overs) | | Azhar Ali 107 (125); Ikramullah Khan 3/71 (10 overs) |

Lahore Lions won by 197 runs
Mirpur Cricket Stadium, Mirpur
Umpires: Aftab Gillani and Raweed Khan

- Abbottabad Falcons won the toss and elected to field
- List A debuts: Baber Khan (Abbottabad Falcons) and Mohammad Aftab (Lahore Lions)
- Lahore Lions 2 points, Abbottabad Falcons 0 points

17 March
09:15
Scorecard

| Faisalabad Wolves; 160/8 (45.4 overs) | v | Islamabad Leopards; 159 (40.5 overs) |
| Mohammad Salman 32* (32); Raheel Majeed 3/45 (10 overs) | | Babar Azam 49 (70); Imran Ahmed 4/22 (10 overs) |

Faisalabad Wolves won by 2 wickets
Rawalpindi Cricket Stadium, Rawalpindi
Umpires: Saqib Khan and Zameer Haider

- Islamabad Leopards won the toss and elected to bat
- Faisalabad Wolves 2 points, Islamabad Leopards 0 points

17 March
09:15
Scorecard

| Peshawar Panthers; 151 (36.5 overs) | v | Rawalpindi Rams; 316/9 (50 overs) |
| Gauhar Ali 41 (35); Mohammad Nawaz 2/9 (1.5 overs) | | Umar Waheed 96 (93); Jamaluddin 3/40 (10 overs) |

Rawalpindi Rams won by 165 runs
Diamond Club Ground, Islamabad
Umpires: Saqib Khan and Zameer Haider

- Rawalpindi Rams won the toss and elected to bat
- List A debuts: Mehran Ibrahim (Peshawar Panthers) and Adnan Mehmood (Rawalpindi Rams)
- Rawalpindi Rams 2 points, Peshawar Panthers 0 points

=== Knockout stage ===
Semifinals
A1 | Sialkot Stallions | 192 (42.5 overs)
B2 | Lahore Lions | 232 (44 overs)
B1 | Karachi Zebras | 239 (49.3 overs)
A2 | Karachi Dolphins | 158 (43.1 overs)

Final
SF1 | Lahore Lions
SF2 | Karachi Zebras

==== Semi-finals ====
1st Semi-Finals Match Report

20 March
09:30
Scorecard

| Sialkot Stallions; 192 (42.5 overs) | v | Lahore Lions; 232 (44 overs) |
| Shahid Yousuf 40 (48); Qaiser Ashraf 4/33 (8 overs) | | Umar Siddiq 59 (68); Nayyer Abbas 3/38 (9 overs) |

Lahore Lions won by 46 runs (D/L method)
Rawalpindi Cricket Stadium, Rawalpindi
Umpires: Khalid Mahmood and Riazuddin
Player of the match: Qaiser Ashraf and Saad Nasim (Lahore Lions)

- Sialkot Stallions won the toss and elected to field
- Rain stopped play: Lahore Lions 85/2 off 20 overs, 6 overs lost. Revised target: 239 in 44 overs.
- Lahore Lions qualify for the Final and Sialkot Stallions are eliminated as a result of this match

2nd Semi-Finals

21 March
09:30
Scorecard

| Karachi Zebras; 239 (49.3 overs) | v | Karachi Dolphins; 158 (43.1 overs) |
| Akbar-ur-Rehman 63 (84); Atif Maqbool 2/34 (10 overs) | | Shahzaib Hasan 42 (63); Akbar-ur-Rehman 3/13 (6.1 overs) |

Karachi Zebras won by 81 runs
Rawalpindi Cricket Stadium, Rawalpindi
Umpires: Ahsan Raza and Shozab Raza
Player of the match: Akbar-ur-Rehman (Karachi Zebras)

- Karachi Dolphins won the toss and elected to field
- Karachi Zebras qualify for the Final and Karachi Dolphins are eliminated as a result of this match

==== Final ====
23 March
14:30 (D/N)
Scorecard

| Lahore Lions; 37/1 (8.5 overs) | v | Karachi Zebras |
| Raza Ali Dar 15* (24); Rumman Raees 1/15 (4 overs) |

No result
Rawalpindi Cricket Stadium, Rawalpindi
Umpires: Sajid Afridi and Saqib Khan

- Lahore Lions won the toss and elected to bat
- Rain stopped play after 8.5 overs in Lahore Lions innings
- 2013 Faysal Bank One Day Cup shared by Lahore Lions and Karachi Zebras

== Statistics ==
=== Most runs ===
| Player | Team | Runs | Inns | Avg | Highest | 100s | 50s |
|---|---|---|---|---|---|---|---|
| Sohaib Maqsood | Multan Tigers | 475 | 6 | 95.00 | 156 | 1 | 3 |
| Shahzaib Hasan | Karachi Dolphins | 368 | 7 | 61.33 | 135 | 1 | 2 |
| Nawaz Ahmed | Peshawar Panthers | 367 | 5 | 73.40 | 167 | 1 | 2 |
| Rizwan Ahmed | Hyderabad Hawks | 356 | 6 | 71.20 | 101* | 1 | 3 |
| Azhar Ali | Lahore Lions | 336 | 7 | 67.20 | 107 | 1 | 2 |

=== Most wickets ===
| Player | Team | Inning | Overs | Wkts | Ave | Econ | BBI | 4 | 5 |
|---|---|---|---|---|---|---|---|---|---|
| Bilawal Bhatti | Sialkot Stallions | 7 | 61.3 | 14 | 18.57 | 4.22 | 4/59 | 1 | 0 |
| Aamer Yamin | Multan Tigers | 6 | 43.5 | 13 | 19.84 | 5.88 | 5/65 | 0 | 1 |
| Atif Maqbool | Karachi Dolphins | 7 | 58.5 | 13 | 20.15 | 4.45 | 3/16 | 0 | 0 |
| Misbah Khan | Karachi Zebras | 5 | 46.0 | 12 | 17.25 | 4.50 | 4/30 | 1 | 0 |
| Zohaib Khan | Peshawar Panthers | 5 | 48.1 | 12 | 18.08 | 4.50 | 4/21 | 1 | 0 |
| Mansoor Amjad | Sialkot Stallions | 7 | 55.5 | 12 | 21.16 | 4.54 | 4/25 | 1 | 0 |
