= Mumtaz Bhutto =

Pakistani politician (1933–2021)

- ڏهيسر سنڌھ ممتاز علي ڀٽو

13th & 18th Chief Minister of Sindh
- In office 7 November 1996 – 26 February 1997
- In office 1 May 1972 – 20 December 1973
- Governor: Mir Rasool Bux Talpur
- Preceded by: M. A. Khuhro
- Succeeded by: Ghulam Mustafa Jatoi

8th Governor of Sindh
- In office 22 December 1971 – 20 April 1972
- President: Zulfikar Ali Bhutto
- Preceded by: Lt Gen Rakhman Gul And Irfan Soomro
- Succeeded by: Mir Rasool Bux Talpur

Personal details
- Born: 28 November 1933 Pir Bux Bhutto, Bombay Presidency, British India (now Pakistan)
- Died: 18 July 2021 (aged 87) Karachi, Sindh, Pakistan
- Party: Pakistan Tehreek-e-Insaf (2017–2021)
- Other political affiliations: Pakistan Peoples Party (1967–1989); Sindh National Front (1989–2017)
- Relations: Ameer Buksh Khan Bhutto (son); Ali Haider Bhutto (son); Zulfikar Ali Bhutto (cousin); Shah Nawaz Bhutto (uncle); Ghulam Murtaza Bhutto (grandfather); Zahida Bhutto (daughter); Tasneem Bhutto (daughter); Syed Ghulam Qadir Shah Jamote (son in law)
- Parent: Nabi Bux Khan Bhutto (father)
- Profession: Chief of Bhutto Tribe, Politician

Mumtaz Ali Khan Bhutto (Urdu: ممتاز علی بھٹو, Sindhi: ممتاز علي ڀٽو) (28 November 1933 – 18 July 2021) was a Pakistani politician who served as 8th Governor of Sindh and later the 13th Chief Minister of Sindh. He was also the first cousin of late Zulfiqar Ali Bhutto, who was the Prime Minister of Pakistan from 1973 to 1977.

== Early life and education ==
Mumtaz Ali Bhutto was born on 28 November 1933 in the village of Pir Bux Bhutto, Larkana District, Sindh, British Raj. Before the partition his father Nawab Nabi Bux Khan Bhutto was a member of the legislative assembly and had a strong political background.

Bhutto attended St George's College in Mussoorie and then Lawrence College, Murree, after the independence of Pakistan. He earned his barrister degree from Lincoln's Inn, and undergraduate and master's degrees in 1959 from Oxford University in the United Kingdom.

He had four children including politician Ameer Bux Bhutto, journalist Ali Haider Bhutto, his other two daughters are less well known, Zahida Bhutto - the eldest child- and Tasneem Bhutto.

== Political career ==
Bhutto became a member of the National Assembly at the age of 32 years on 5 March 1965. When he and his cousin Zulfikar Ali Bhutto announced a new political party, Pakistan Peoples Party (PPP) on 30 March 1967, he also became the founding member and principal executive committee member of the party.

He and his cousin Zulfikar Ali Bhutto fought the election of 17 March 1970 against Muhammad Ayub Khuhro and Qazi Fazlullah Ubaidullah. He earned a victory against Qazi Fazlullah.

His cousin, Zulfikar Ali Bhutto, became the first democratically elected Prime Minister of Pakistan and Mumtaz Ali Bhutto became Governor of Sindh on 24 December 1971, then Chief Minister of Sindh Province on 1 May 1972. His cousin always used to call him a "talented cousin".

Citing differences with Benazir Bhutto, Bhutto split from Pakistan Peoples Party and created his own party, Sindh National Front (SNF) in 1989. In May 2012, prior to the 2013 Pakistani general election, he announced his party's alliance with the Pakistan Muslim League (N) (PML-N). In August 2016, Bhutto quit the PML-N and revived the Sindh National Front. In November 2017, prior to the 2018 Pakistani general election, he merged SNF with the Pakistan Tehreek-e-Insaf.

=== Chief Ministership ===
As a Chief Minister, he announced Sindhi language as the official language of the Province. Sindhi Language Bill, 1972 was introduced by the Chief Minister Mumtaz Bhutto on 3 July 1972, in the Sindh Assembly, Pakistan. The 1972 Language violence in Sindh occurred starting on 7 July 1972, when the Sindh Assembly passed The Sind Teaching, Promotion and Use of Sindhi Language Bill, 1972 which established Sindhi language as the sole official language of the province resulting in language violence in Sindh. Due to the clashes, Prime Minister Zulfikar Ali Bhutto, compromised and announced that Urdu and Sindhi will both be official languages of Sindh. The making of Sindhi as an equal language to Urdu for official purposes frustrated the Urdu-speaking people as they did not speak the Sindhi language. On 7 March 1977 he won a National Assembly seat and became a Federal Minister. In the year of 1977, his cousin nominated him as president of 'PPP-Sindh'. He was arrested during the struggle against the arrest of his cousin and then exiled by General Zia's government. On 31 March 1985 he announced a new political Alliance named "Sindhi–Baloch–Pashtun Front" at London to propagate ethnic nationalism in Pakistan. He also announced support for a new constitutional framework for Pakistan as a weak federation. He became the convenor of the alliance for Pakistan, returned to Pakistan, and once again was arrested by the military government of Zia. On 31 March 1989, he called the workers' convention at Hyderabad Sindh and announced a new political party named 'Sindh National Front'. He was elected to a seat in the provincial assembly from Larkana on 6 October 1993. On 6 November 1996, he became the caretaker Chief Minister of Sindh.

== Political views ==
Mumtaz Bhutto has been a critic of Asif Ali Zardari who he accused of corruption and usurping the Pakistan Peoples Party by using the Bhutto family name to gain power.

== Death ==
Mumtaz Bhutto was suffering from multiple diseases in lungs and cardiac issues and he was admitted in a private hospital of Karachi. He died on 18 July 2021 at Karachi and he was buried at his native graveyard at Larkana.

== Books ==
- Confederation, 1986, 87 p.
- Shattered Hopes, 2009, 229 p.

== See also ==
- Bhutto
- Bhutto family

Political offices
Preceded by Rakhman Gul	Governor of Sindh; 1971–1972	Succeeded by Mir Rasool Bux Talpur
Preceded by Muhammad Ayub Khuhro	Chief Minister of Sindh; 1972–1973	Succeeded by Ghulam Mustafa Jatoi
Preceded by Syed Abdullah Shah	Chief Minister of Sindh (caretaker); 1996–1997	Succeeded by Liaquat Ali Jatoi
Preceded by Nawab Nabi Bux Khan Bhutto	Chief of Bhutto Tribe; 1979–2021	Vacant
