= Songs of Blood and Sword =

Book by Fatima Bhutto

Songs of Blood And Sword
- First edition (UK)
- Author: Fatima Bhutto
- Language: English
- Genre: Memoir
- Published: 2010
- Publisher: Nation Books (US); Jonathan Cape (UK)
- Pages: 496 pages
- ISBN: 9788184753899

Songs of Blood and Sword (2010) is a memoir written by Pakistani writer and columnist Fatima Bhutto. The book recounts the murder of the author's father, Murtaza Bhutto, by the Pakistani police in Karachi in 1996, when she was a 14-year-old. The story covers the events she saw through her eyes in her young lifetime.

== Theme ==
Songs of Blood and Sword: A Daughter's Memoir chronicles the tragic life of a family of Pakistan– the Bhutto family of Pakistan. The author mainly describes the murder of her father, Murtaza Bhutto in a police encounter outside their home in Karachi when her aunt Benazir Bhutto was sitting prime minister. In the book, the author blamed her aunt and her husband Asif Ali Zardari for the murder of her father, who was the biggest threat for her government. The author also hinted that the mysterious poisoning of her uncle Shahnawaz Bhutto in 1985 was the work of some combination of the Zia regime, the CIA and Benazir.

Additionally, the book traces the history of four generations of Bhuttos and their political power, while also providing insights into the accusations of fraud and violence within Pakistani political circles.

== Response ==
=== Critics ===
Songs of Blood and Sword received mostly mixed reviews from critics. William Dalrymple published a review in the Financial Times saying: "Songs of Blood and Sword is moving, witty and well-written. It is also passionately partisan: this is not, and does not pretend to be, an objective account of Murtaza Bhutto, so much as a love-letter from a grieving daughter to her father and an act of literary vengeance and account-settling by a niece who believes her aunt had her father murdered." Thomas Lippman wrote a review of Songs of Blood and Sword for Washington Post in which he noted that "[I]t is at least 50 pages too long, larded with self-indulgent emotional outbursts and personality sketches of minor characters, and her reflexive anti-Americanism is tiresome", but he described it is a valuable read for those who want to understand why Pakistan is such an ungovernable mess.

The Guardian also published a review by Roderick Matthews, who wrote: "This book is not an explicit prosecution of the Pakistani government; there are no damning documentary revelations. But for those who like their history presented in personal terms, it will not disappoint. Hope, injustice, drama and grief are all ably captured and conveyed in what is a highly readable introduction to the grim realities of domestic politics in Pakistan." Arifa Akbar's noted in a review in The Independent: "As much as this is a loving portrait of Murtaza, it also reads as a hate-filled expose of Benazir and her husband. Once Fatima's favourite aunt, nicknamed Pinky, Benazir is shown as a rapacious woman who may have had a hand in her brothers' deaths. The trouble with these dichotomous portraits of good sibling/evil sibling is that they are crassly over-simplified."

Shobhan Saxena's review in The Times of India pointed out unconvincing attacks on Zardari and criticised the author for being slanted on historical fact. Saxena wrote: "In fact, the book is an attack on Zardari whom Fatima blames for everything wrong with Pakistan today. And that's the problem with the book. Fatima fails to see anything wrong with the Bhuttos. They are presented as martyrs who died for Pakistan. The fact that all of them died in either pursuit of power or during internal power struggles has been ignored by the writer. With their feudal, arrogant attitude, the Bhuttos have been part of the problem and not the solution. But the writer fails to address this issue."

== Controversy ==
The book created an angry reaction in Pakistan. Critics and several relatives accused Fatima of twisting history to make unverified allegations that give a negative impression to the memory of Benazir Bhutto, the country's only female prime minister. In the book, Fatima has suggested that Benazir also played a role in another family murder – the poisoning of her brother Shahnawaz in the south of France in 1985 – that has elicited the most vivid reaction. Benazir's sister and Fatima's aunt Sanam Bhutto published an article in Dawn accusing Fatima of disputing history and calling the book an "assault on her family, on reality and, above all, on the truth." Tariq Islam, nephew of Zulfiqar Ali Bhutto, also published an article on Dawn challenging Fatima's version of history. Amina Jilani, who served in parliament in Benazir's first term, has claimed that Fatima has disputed her opinion that she expressed during her interview with her.
