= Shah Nawaz Bhutto =

Pakistani politician (1888–1957)

Sir Shah Nawaz Bhutto CIE OBE
- شاہ نواز بھٹو

Personal details
- Born: 8 March 1888 Garhi Khuda Bakhsh, Sind, Bombay Presidency, British India
- Died: 19 November 1957 (aged 69) Larkana, West Pakistan
- Resting place: Bhutto family mausoleum
- Spouse(s): Khursheed Begum Bhutto, Lady Bhutto
- Children: 4, including Zulfikar
- Relatives: See Bhutto family
- Education: St Patrick's High School, Karachi
- Alma mater: Sindh Madressatul Islam University
- Occupation: Politician; landowner

Sir Shah Nawaz Bhutto (Note: Sindhi: شاھ نواز ڀِٽو, Urdu: شاہ نواز بھٹو) (8 March 1888 – 19 November 1957) was a Pakistani politician and landowner who was the head of the Bhutto family and served as the last prime minister (dewan) of Junagadh from 1947 to 1948, until its accession to India. He represented Sind in the Bombay Legislative Council from 1921 to 1936. He was the father of Zulfikar Ali Bhutto, the fourth president and ninth prime minister of Pakistan.

== Early life and education ==
Shah Nawaz Bhutto was born on 8 March 1888 in Garhi Khuda Bakhsh in Ratodero Taleka in the Larkana District of the Sind region, within the Bombay Presidency of British India (now in Sindh, Pakistan) into a Shia Muslim family of the Bhutto clan to father Ghulam Murtaza Bhutto. He was also the youngest brother of Nawab Nabi Bux Khan Bhutto.

The Bhutto family owned 250,000 acres of land spread across Sindh, in Larkana, Sukkur and Jacobabad. Shah Nawaz got his early education and later at St. Patrick's High School in Karachi, and then at Sindh Madressa, also in Karachi.

== Career and dewan of Junagadh ==
Bhutto entered the Legislative Council of the Bombay Province, of which Sindh was a part, in 1921 at the age of 33. He continued till 1936. During this time, he received the honours of CIE followed by knighthood. In 1934, he became a minister in the Bombay government.

Bhutto attended the Round Table Conference in 1931 as a leader of Sindhi Muslims demanding separation of Sind from the Bombay province. This was eventually granted in the Government of India Act 1935, with Sind becoming a separate province on 1 April 1936. Bhutto was appointed as a chief advisor to the Governor of Sind.

In preparation for the provincial elections in 1937, the Sind United Party was formed by Haji Abdullah Haroon and Bhutto joined it as the vice-chairman of the party. It was modeled after the Punjab Unionist Party and claimed to represent all Sindhis irrespective of religion. Nevertheless, Bhutto brought leading pirs (Sufi saints) to influence the voters 'religiously' to cast their votes in his favour. The Sind United Party emerged as the largest party in the elections, winning 21 out of 60 seats. However, both Harron and Bhutto failed to get elected. The Larkana seat, which Bhutto had contested, was won by Sheikh Abdul Majid Sindhi. The Governor invited Ghulam Hussain Hidayatullah, the leader of the Sind Muslim Party and a political rival of Bhutto in Sind, to form a government. Large scale defections took place in the Assembly, Bhutto resigned from the party and Haroon eventually merged his party into the All-India Muslim League. Bhutto returned to Bombay to become the Chairman of the Bombay-Sind Public Service Commission. Early in 1947, Bhutto joined the council of ministers of Muhammad Mahabat Khan III the Nawab of Junagadh in the modern-day province of Gujarat, becoming its Dewan, or prime minister in May. At the time of the independence of India in 1947, the princely states were asked by the British to decide whether to join the newly independent states of India or Pakistan or to remain autonomous and outside them. The Constitutional Advisor to the Nawab, Nabi Baksh, indicated to Lord Mountbatten that he was recommending that the State should join India. However, the Nawab did not make a decision. Early in 1947, Bhutto was invited to join the Council of Ministers of the Nawab. In May, when the Dewan Abdul Khadir Muhammad Hussain went abroad for medical treatment, Bhutto was appointed as the Dewan. On 15 August 1947, the State announced that it had acceded to Pakistan. On 13 September 1947, the Government of Pakistan accepted the accession.

However, the Hindu citizens of the State revolted which was followed by the Indian annexation of Junagadh, followed by a plebiscite, Nawab Muhammad Mahabat Khan III of Junagadh (erstwhile Babi Nawab dynasty of Junagadh) fled to Sindh, Pakistan.

Sir Shah Nawaz Bhutto moved to Larkana District, where his land-ownership made him among the wealthiest and most influential people in Sindh. Bhutto was a good friend of Governor General (later President) Iskander Mirza, who was a regular guest for the annual hunt in Larkana, staying at the Bhutto family home called Al-Murtaza. In the winter of 1955-1956, Mirza brought General Ayub Khan with him to Larkana for the hunt.

== Personal life ==
Bhutto was a first cousin once removed of Wahid Baksh Bhutto, who in 1924 was made a sardar and in 1926 was elected to the Imperial Legislative Assembly from Sindh, a constituency of the Bombay Presidency, becoming the first member of the Bhutto family to be elected to public office.

Shah Nawaz Bhutto was married to Khursheed Begum (born as Lakhi Bai), who was of a modest Gujarati or Kutchi Hindu family in Gujarat. She converted from Hinduism to Islam before her marriage. Their children included their first son, Sikandar, who died from pneumonia at the age of seven in 1914, their second child, Imdad Ali, died of cirrhosis at the age of thirty-nine in 1953. Their third son, Zulfikar Ali Bhutto, was born in his parents' residence near Larkana, and later became the Prime Minister of Pakistan. Their fourth child, a daughter, Mumtaz Sahiba Bhutto, was married to Brigadier Muhammad Mustafa Khan Bahadur of the Sidi clan.

== Honours and legacy ==
The British imperial government awarded Bhutto the title of Khan Sahib, subsequently raising it to Khan Bahadur. Bhutto was appointed an Officer of the Order of the British Empire, Civil Division (OBE) in the 1920 New Year Honours list, with a further appointment as a Companion of the Order of the Indian Empire (CIE) in the 1925 New Year Honours list. In the 1930 New Year Honours, Bhutto was knighted, and was invested with his knighthood on 27 February 1930 at Viceroy's House in New Delhi by the Viceroy of India, Lord Irwin.

- He was a Delegate to the Round Table Conference in London in 1930-31 as a leader of Sindhi Muslims demanding separation of Sindh from the Bombay Province
- Pakistan Postal Services issued a commemorative postage stamp in his honor in its 'Pioneers of Freedom' series.

== See also ==
- Bhutto family
- Shahnawaz Bhutto
