= Sindh National Front =

Sindh National Front سندھ نیشنل فرنٹ
- Sindhi name: سنڌ نيشنل فرنٽ
- Abbreviation: SNF
- Leader: Mumtaz Bhutto
- Vice Chairman: Ameer Bux Bhutto
- Founder: Mumtaz Bhutto
- Founded: 1989; 37 years ago
- Dissolved: 2017; 9 years ago
- Split from: PPP
- Merged into: PTI
- Ideology: Autonomy for Sindh; Sindhi nationalism Social democracy Democratic socialism Liberal socialism Progressivism; Secularism; Self-determination; Left-wing nationalism
- Political position: Centre-left to left-wing
- National affiliation: GDA
- Colors: Red and White

Party flag

Sindh National Front (S.N.F.) was a political party active in the province of Sindh, Pakistan. It was led by Mumtaz Bhutto, the cousin of Mr. Zulfiqar Ali Bhutto, ex-Prime Minister of Pakistan, who was hanged by President Muhammad Zia-ul-Haq. In 2017, the party merged with Pakistan Tehreek-e-Insaf.

== Ideology ==
The main objective of the party was a 'confederation' where each of the four provinces of Pakistan (Sindh, Punjab, Khyber-Pakhtunkhwa and Baluchistan) are semi-independent. The party had stated that it desires to bring about the same kind of autonomy federating units have in the United States, Canada, India, Australia, and the cantons in Switzerland. However, none of the aforementioned countries are de facto confederations.

Sindh National Front believed that the 'provincial autonomy' which presently exists in Pakistan, provided in accordance with the Government of India Act of 1935, was actually meant for the provinces of colonial India and not for the provinces of a free and independent Pakistan. But after that in 1940 (Lahore resolution) was the main theme of Independent Pakistan. The party stated that the Lahore Resolution is totally in favour of a Confederation, although varying interpretations exist such as the belief that Pakistan was originally believed to come into existence as three or more regions that would not have bordered each other and therefore would have to be autonomous for good governance. Later, in the 2002 general election, the party joined the National Alliance, later forming the Pakistan Muslim League, with other polictial parties, such as the National Peoples Party (NPP).

== Activities ==
Sindh National Front (SNF) has been engaged in Leftist sociol-political activism in Pakistan and strongly opposing Pakistan Peoples Party (PPP) government in Sindh since the Asif Ali Zardari become the president of Pakistan Peoples Party the SNF has been a criticized of Asif Ali Zardari who he accused of corruption and usurping the Pakistan Peoples Party by using the Bhutto family name to gain power and SNF joined Grand Democratic Alliance (GDA) to defeat the Pakistan Peoples Party in the Sindh province, which is considered a stronghold of the PPP The alliance has been seen as a major challenger to the PPP in Sindh. The SNF struggling against despotism, theocratic & fascist terrorism, and economic exploitation of smaller constituent units with a special focus on Sindh and Sindhi people. It is poised to play a pivotal role in parliamentary politics of Pakistan, by contesting elections and undertaking formal activities in political and developmental spheres as an organized institution.

== Dissolution and merger with PTI ==
In 2017, the party merged with Pakistan Tehreek-e-Insaf (PTI) on national level, The merger accord was signed by PTI vice chairman Shah Mehmood Qureshi and SNF vice chairman Ameer Bux Bhutto.Taking to the media regarding the merger, Shah Mehmood Quresh said that his party had been in talks with Mumtaz Bhutto for the past few months.The Bux Bhutto said youth of Sindh has welcomed Imran Khan with great valour," Qureshi said, adding that the merger of the SNF with PTI indicates that the party agrees with PTI's "national mindset" PTI is also ready for another breakthrough in Sindh before the month of November is over," Qureshi said, while adding that his party is in contact with a number of political bigwigs from Sindh.The people of Sindh are unhappy with the current government,"Bux Bhutto said while speaking to the media, However the party also decide to being still the part of Grand Democratic Alliance (GDA) for the regional political influence against Pakistan peoples party in Sindh.
