= Zulfikar Ali Bhutto Jr. =

Pakistani performance artist (born 1990)

- جونيئر ذوالفقار علي ڀٽو
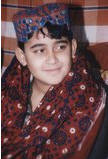
- Bhutto in 1997
- Born: Zulfikar Ali Bhutto; 1 August 1990 (age 36); Damascus, Syria
- Education: San Francisco Art Institute; University of Edinburgh
- Occupations: Politician, visual artist
- Organization: Founder of Bulhan Bachao
- Known for: Human rights activism, wildlife advocacy, drag, performance art
- Political party: PTI (2026-present)
- Parents: Murtaza Bhutto (father); Ghinwa Bhutto (mother)
- Relatives: Bhutto family
- Website: zulfikaralibhuttoart.org

Zulfikar Ali Bhutto Jr. (Note: Urdu: ذو الفقار علی بھٹو جونیئر, Sindhi: جونيئر ذوالفقار علي ڀٽو) (born 1 August 1990) is a Pakistani visual artist, politician, and human-rights activist. Born and raised in Syria by his Lebanese mother Ghinwa Bhutto, he is a member of the Bhutto family; and is the son of Murtaza Bhutto and a grandson of his namesake, former Pakistani president and prime minister Zulfikar Ali Bhutto. Bhutto lives in Karachi, Pakistan, and is active in politics.

== Life, family, and career ==
Bhutto was born on 1 August 1990 into the Sindhi Bhutto family in Damascus, Syria. He is the son of Murtaza Bhutto, a politician who was assassinated when he was six years old, and Ghinwa Bhutto, who leads the Pakistan Peoples Party of Shaheed Bhutto. He has a half-sister, Fatima Bhutto, from his father's first marriage. He is of Pakistani descent from his father and has Lebanese ancestry from his mother's side. Bhutto was named after his grandfather Zulfikar Ali Bhutto, the former Prime Minister and President of Pakistan, and is the only male inherent of the Bhutto's family. His grandmother, Nusrat Bhutto, is of Iranian-Kurdish descent. The former Prime Minister of Pakistan, Benazir Bhutto is his paternal aunt, and her husband and former President of Pakistan, Asif Ali Zardari, is his uncle-by-marriage, while his father's brother, Shahnawaz Bhutto, is his uncle. The politician, Bilawal Bhutto Zardari, is his first cousin.

Bhutto received his Master of Fine Arts degree in 2016 from the San Francisco Art Institute. He has two undergraduate degrees from the University of Edinburgh.

Bhutto has worked on creative projects such as Mussalmaan Musclemen (2017), The Third Muslim: Queer and Trans Muslim Narratives of Resistance and Resilience (2018), The Alif Series (2019), and Tomorrow We Inherit the Earth (2019). In 2015, he exhibited an artworks titled ‘The Shrine’, which dealt with the subject of marginalized minorities in Pakistan through photo manipulation, portraiture and conceptual art.

He is known for his performance art and drag performances. Artist and designer Hushidar Mortezaie has worked with Bhutto and designed some of his performance costumes.

In July 2022, he withdrew his participation from the Goethe Institute Film Fest in solidarity with Palestine, as Palestinian activist Mohammed El-Kurd was not invited. Additionally, writer Mohammed Hanif withdrew from the Goethe Institute conference.
