= Ayaz Soomro =

Pakistani politician and lawyer

- ایاز سومرو

Member of the National Assembly of Pakistan
- In office 1 June 2013 – 20 March 2018
- Preceded by: Shahid Hussain Bhutto
- Constituency: NA-204 (Larkana-I)
- Majority: 50,118

Member of the Provincial Assembly of Sindh
- In office 2008–2013
- Preceded by: Himself
- Succeeded by: Muhammad Ali Khan Bhutto
- Constituency: PS-37 (Larkana-III)
- Majority: 40,770
- In office 2002–2007
- Preceded by: Constituency established
- Succeeded by: Himself
- Constituency: PS-37 (Larkana-III)
- Majority: 29,187

Personal details
- Born: 31 December 1958 Larkana, Pakistan
- Died: 20 March 2018 (aged 59) New York City, New York, U.S.
- Party: Pakistan Peoples Party

Muhammad Ayaz Soomro (Urdu: محمد ایاز سومرہ; 31, Sindhi: محمد اياز سومرو December 1958 – 20 March 2018) was a Pakistani politician and lawyer, who had been a member of the National Assembly of Pakistan, from June 2013 to March 2018. Previously he had been a member of the Provincial Assembly of Sindh from 2002 to 2007 and again from 2008 to 2013. During his second tenure as member of the Provincial Assembly of Sindh, he served in the cabinet of Sindh as provincial minister in various positions.

== Early life and education ==
He was born on 31 December 1958 in Larkana to Sian Khuda Bakhsh Soomro (d. 2015), a local primary school teacher.

He received the degree of Bachelor of Arts, Bachelor of Laws and Master of Arts, all from the University of Sindh.

== Professional career ==
Soomro was a lawyer by profession.

He remained a member of the Supreme Court Bar Association of Pakistan from Larkana and served as president of Larkana District Bar for ten years.

== Political career ==
Soomro joined Peoples Students Federation during his student life and began his political career as counselor of the Municipal Committee Larkana in 1987.

He was elected to the Provincial Assembly of Sindh as a candidate of Pakistan Peoples Party (PPP) from Constituency PS-37 (Larkana-III) in the 2002 Pakistani general election. He obtained 29,187 votes and defeated Ameer Bux Bhutto, a candidate of the National Alliance.

He was re-elected to the Provincial Assembly of Sindh as a candidate of PPP from Constituency PS-37 (Larkana-III) in the 2008 Pakistani general election. He received 40,770 votes and defeated Ameer Bux Bhutto. In April 2008, he was inducted into the provincial Sindh cabinet of Chief Minister Syed Qaim Ali Shah and was made Provincial Minister of Sindh for Law, with the additional ministerial portfolio of Parliamentary Affairs, Sports and Youth Affairs. In March 2011, he was made Provincial Minister of Sindh for Law with the additional ministerial portfolio of Parliamentary Affairs. In November 2011, he was made Provincial Minister for Jail. In November 2012, he was allocated the additional ministerial portfolios of housing and livestock.

He was elected to the National Assembly of Pakistan as a candidate of PPP from Constituency NA-204 (Larkana-I) in the 2013 Pakistani general election. He received 50,118 votes and defeated a candidate of Pakistan Muslim League (F).

== Death ==
Soomro died on 20 March 2018 at a hospital in Manhattan, United States where he was receiving medical treatment.
