= Nabi Bux Khan Bhutto =

Pakistani lawyer and politician

Head of the Bhutto family
- In office 19 November 1957 – 6 December 1965
- Preceded by: Shah Nawaz Bhutto
- Succeeded by: Zulfikar Ali Bhutto

Personal details
- Born: 2 January 1887 Bombay, Bombay Presidency, British India
- Died: 6 December 1965 (aged 78) Sindh, West Pakistan, Pakistan
- Cause of death: Cardiac arrest
- Relations: Bhutto family
- Children: Mumtaz Bhutto (son)
- Parent: Ghulam Murtaza Bhutto (father)

Nawab Nabi Bux Khan Bhutto (2 January 1887 – 6 December 1965) was the Pakistani lawyer and political leader who was the member of legislative assembly before Partition of India till 14 August 1947. He was also the brother of Shah Nawaz Bhutto, who later became father of Zulfikar Ali Bhutto. He is also famous for being father of Mumtaz Bhutto and grandfather of Ameer Bux Bhutto.

== Relations ==
Bhutto was born on 2 January 1887 in Mumbai to Ghulam Murtaza Bhutto. He was married and he had a son Mumtaz Bhutto (1933–2021). Mumtaz Bhutto has also married and has a son Ameer Bux Bhutto. He was the eldest brother of Shah Nawaz Bhutto, who later became the father of Zulfiqar Ali Bhutto.
