= Constituency NA-204 =

Former constituency of the National Assembly of Pakistan

Constituency NA-204 (Larkana-I)
- Former constituency for the National Assembly of Pakistan
- Region: Larkana District

Former constituency
- Created: 2002
- Abolished: 2018

Constituency NA-204 (Larkana-I) (Urdu: این اے-۲۰۴، لاڑکانہ-۱) was a constituency for the National Assembly of Pakistan. It was abolished in the 2018 delimitation after the overlap between the constituencies of Larkana District and Qambar Shahdadkot District was undone. Now the two districts have separate constituencies: NA-200 (Larkana-I), NA-201 (Larkana-II), NA-202 (Qambar Shahdadkot-I), and NA-203 (Qambar Shahdadkot-II). And the area of the former NA-204 is divided between NA-200 and NA-201.

== Election 2002 ==
General elections were held on 10 October 2002. Muhammad Anwar Bhutto of the PPP won by 46,743 votes.

General election 2002: NA-204 (Larkana-I)
Party	Candidate	Votes	%	±%
PPP	Muhammad Anwar Bhutto	46,743	66.72	
PML(Q)	Syed Peer Shah Bukhari	11,062	15.79	
PML(N)	Babu Sarfraz Khan Jatoi	5,649	8.06	
MMA	Muhammad Ashique Dhamraho	2,887	4.12	
MQM	Riaz Hussain Kanasiro	2,129	3.04	
Others	Others (two candidates)	1,585	2.27	
Turnout		72,296	26.29	
Total valid votes		70,055	96.90	
Rejected ballots		2,241	3.10	
Majority		35,681	50.93	
Registered electors		275,041		

== Election 2008 ==
General elections were held on 18 February 2008. Shahid Hussain Bhutto of the PPP won by 81,439 votes.

General election 2008: NA-204 (Larkana-I)
Party	Candidate	Votes	%	±%
PPP	Shahid Hussain Bhutto	81,439	83.36	
PPP(SB)	Muhtarma Ghanwa Bhutto	12,271	12.56	
Others	Others (twelve candidates)	3,987	4.08	
Turnout		99,531	26.61	
Total valid votes		97,697	98.16	
Rejected ballots		1,834	1.84	
Majority		69,168	70.80	
Registered electors		374,076		

== Election 2013 ==
General elections were held on 11 May 2013. Mohammad Ayaz Soomro of the PPP won by 50,128 votes and became a member of National Assembly. On 27 December 2016, Soomro announced his resignation from the National Assembly to pave the way for Bilawal Bhutto Zardari to run for the seat.

General election 2013: NA-204 (Larkana-I)
Party	Candidate	Votes	%	±%
PPP	Mohammad Ayaz Soomro	50,118	37.15	
PML(F)	Mehtab Akbar Rashidi	32,006	23.73	
Independent	Moazzam Ali Knan	28,744	21.31	
PPP(SB)	Ghanva Bhutto	4,936	3.66	
Independent	Ghulam Umar Khan Unar	4,277	3.17	
Independent	Shahid Hussain Bhutto	3,801	2.82	
Independent	Mohammad Mohsan Mashori	3,549	2.63	
Others	Others (twelve candidates)	7,460	5.53	
Turnout		142,366	47.51	
Total valid votes		134,891	94.75	
Rejected ballots		7,475	5.25	
Majority		18,112	13.42	
Registered electors		299,653		
