= Pakistan Peoples Party (Shaheed Bhutto) =

Pakistan Peoples Party (Shaheed Bhutto) پاکستان پیپلز پارٹی (شہید بھٹو)
- Sindhi name: پاڪستان پيپلز پارٽي شهيد ڀٽو
- Abbreviation: PPP-SB
- Leader: Zulfikar Ali Bhutto Jr.
- Chairman: Ghinwa Bhutto
- Historical leader: Murtaza Bhutto †
- Founder: Murtaza Bhutto
- Founded: 1995
- Split from: Pakistan Peoples Party
- Ideology: Secularism; Democratic socialism Left-wing populism Left-wing nationalism
- Political position: Left-wing
- National affiliation: Grand Democratic Alliance

Election symbol
- Fist

Party flag

Website
- pppsb.org.pk

The Pakistan Peoples Party (Shaheed Bhutto) (Sindhi: پيپلز پارٽي شهيدڀٽو; abbreviated as PPP-SB Sindhi: پ پ شهيد ڀٽو) is a political party in Pakistan and one of three breakaway factions of the old Pakistan Peoples Party. The party is currently headed by Ghinwa Bhutto, the widow of Murtaza Bhutto.

In December 2012, Ghinwa Bhutto stated that her stepdaughter Fatima Bhutto would contest in the 2013 general elections for a seat in the National Assembly on behalf of the Pakistan Peoples Party (Shaheed Bhutto). Fatima was not present on the occasion. However, Fatima is known for her outspoken public stance in the past where she had several times expressed no desire to run for public office. She ruled a political career out "entirely because of the effect of dynasties on Pakistan"; this referred to the Bhutto family's involvement in politics that has continued through several generations of the family.
