= Kennedy Market =

John F. Kennedy Market
- Interactive map of the John F. Kennedy Market area

General information
- Type: Marketplace
- Location: Larkana, Sindh, Pakistan
- Coordinates: 27°33′38″N 68°12′40″E
- Named for: John F. Kennedy
- Opened: 1964

John F. Kennedy Market, commonly known as Kennedy Market, is a marketplace in Larkana, Sindh, Pakistan.

== History ==
Kennedy Market was developed as a modern shopping center following a fire in Shahi Bazar in August 1961. The fire, occurring in the hometown of then Foreign Minister Zulfikar Ali Bhutto, led to a fundraising effort for reconstruction. This initiative, led by Bhutto, raised funds from various sources including the government of Pakistan, local municipalities, industrialists, traders, and the US embassy, with a notable contribution of 300,000 rupees from the latter.

Constructed on a 28,080 square feet plot on Sir Shahnawaz Bhutto Road, the market was named after John F. Kennedy, reflecting the substantial aid received from the United States. It featured 38 shops and flats and was managed by a Public Charitable Trust formed by Bhutto on August 14, 1964. The trust was responsible for the market's administration and used the surplus funds for community welfare projects.

The market's management changed following Muhammad Zia-ul-Haq's martial law in 1977, transferring control from the trust to the municipal authorities.

In 1988, under the primership of Benazir Bhutto, the trust briefly regained control, and efforts were made to revitalize the market, including establishing a free dispensary for women.

The market also served as a political hub, hosting offices for the Pakistan Peoples Party and the Peoples Party (Shaheed Bhutto), formed after Murtaza Bhutto's assassination. However, over the years, the market's commercial activity diminished, with many shops closing or being repurposed for storage and parking.

The decline of the market was compounded by the loss of historical documents and photographs in the events of December 27, 2007.
