= Shahid Hussain Bhutto =

Pakistani politician

Member of the National Assembly of Pakistan
- In office 2002–2013
- Constituency: Constituency NA-204 (Larkana)

Shahid Hussain Bhutto (Sindhi:شاهد حسين ڀٽو) is a Pakistani politician who was a member of the National Assembly of Pakistan from 2002 to 2013.

== Political career ==
He was elected to the National Assembly of Pakistan from Constituency NA-207 (Larkana-IV) as a candidate of Pakistan Peoples Party (PPP) in the 2002 Pakistani general election. He received 54,349 votes and defeated Khalid Mehmood Soomro.

He was re-elected to the National Assembly from Constituency NA-204 (Larkana) as a candidate of PPP in the 2008 Pakistani general election. He received 81,439 votes and defeated Ghinwa Bhutto.

He ran for the seat of the National Assembly as an independent candidate from Constituency NA-204 (Larkana) in the 2013 Pakistani general election but was unsuccessful. He received 3,801 votes and lost the seat to Ayaz Soomro. In the same election, he ran for the seat of the Provincial Assembly of Sindh as an independent candidate from Constituency PS-36 (Larkana-II) but was unsuccessful. He received 1,067 and lost the seat to Nisar Ahmad Khuhro.
