= Misbah Khan =

Misbah Khan may refer to:

- Misbah Khan (cricketer)
- Misbah Khan (politician)
