= Fatima Bhutto =

Pakistani writer (born 1982)

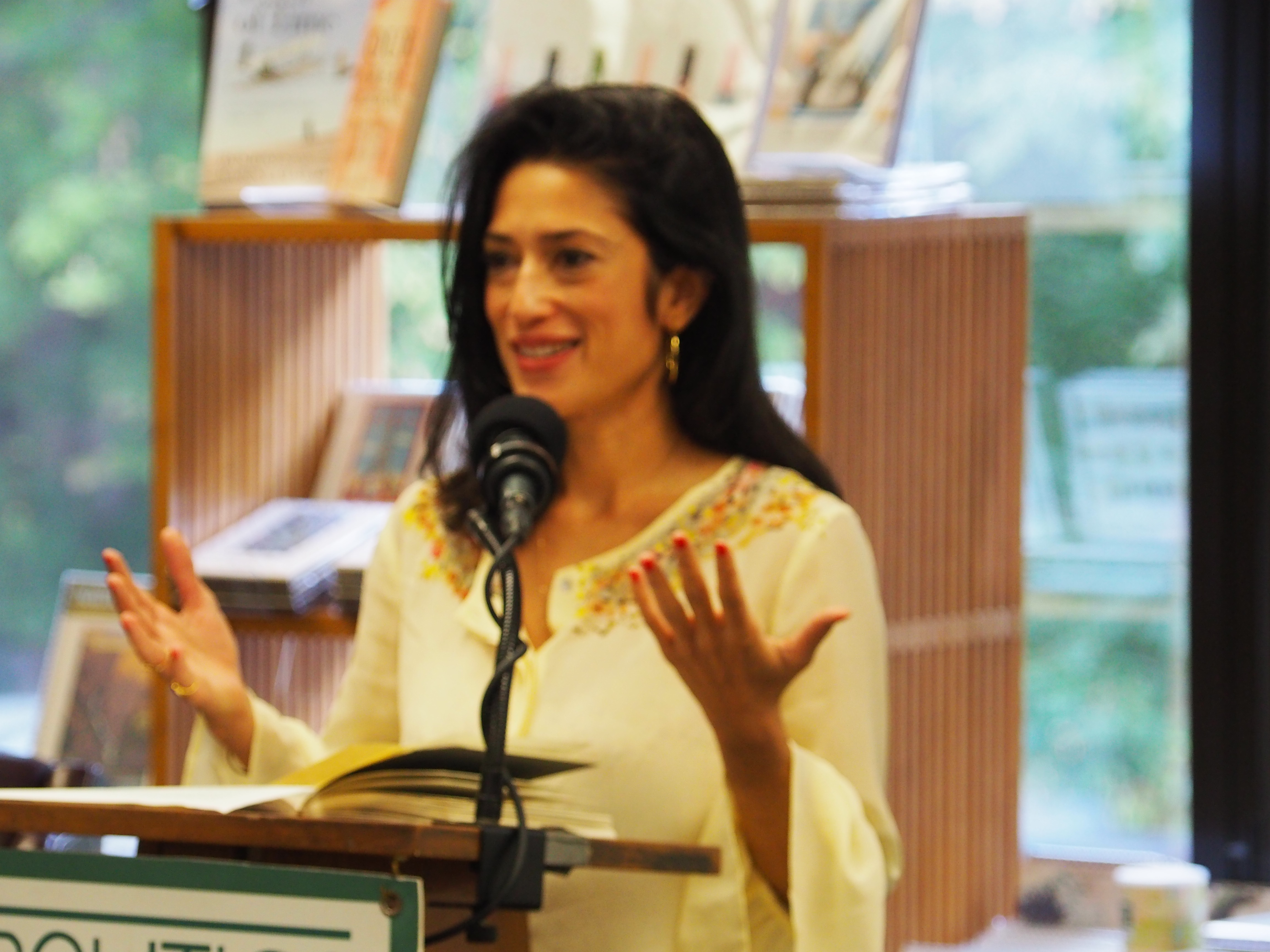
- Bhutto at an event in 2019
- Born: 29 May 1982 (age 44); Kabul, Afghanistan
- Education: Barnard College (BA); University of London (MA)
- Occupations: Writer, columnist
- Spouse: Graham Byra (m. 2023)
- Children: 2
- Parents: Murtaza Bhutto (father); Fauzia Fasihudin Bhutto (mother)
- Relatives: Bhutto family

Fatima Bhutto (Note: Urdu: فاطمہ بھُٹّو; Sindhi: فاطمه ڀٽو) (born 29 May 1982) is a Pakistani writer and columnist. She is the daughter of politician Murtaza Bhutto, and grand-daughter of former Pakistani prime minister and president Zulfiqar Ali Bhutto. Born in Kabul, she was raised in Syria and Karachi, and received her bachelor's degree from Barnard College in New York City, followed by a master's degree from the SOAS, University of London.

Bhutto is a critic of her aunt and former prime minister Benazir Bhutto and her husband Asif Ali Zardari, whom she accused of involvement in her father's murder. Her non-fiction book Songs of Blood and Sword, released in 2010, is about her family. Bhutto has written for The News and The Guardian among other publications.

== Early life and education ==
Bhutto was born on 29 May 1982 to Murtaza Bhutto and his Afghan wife, Fauzia Fasihudin Bhutto, the daughter of Afghanistan's former foreign affairs official in Kabul. Her father was in exile during the military regime of general Zia-ul-Haq. Her parents divorced when she was three years old and her father took Bhutto with him, moving from country to country and she grew up effectively stateless. Her father met Ghinwa Bhutto, a Lebanese ballet teacher in 1989 during his exile in Syria and they married. Bhutto considers Ghinwa as her real mother. Her half-brother Zulfikar Ali Bhutto Jr. is an artist.

Bhutto is the granddaughter of Zulfiqar Ali Bhutto and Nusrat Bhutto, an Iranian Kurd, niece of Benazir Bhutto and her husband Asif Ali Zardari, and Shahnawaz Bhutto. Her father was killed by the police in 1996 in Karachi during the premiership of his sister, Benazir Bhutto. Her biological mother Fauzia Fasihudin unsuccessfully tried to gain parental custody of Bhutto. She lives with her stepmother in Old Clifton, Karachi.

Bhutto received her secondary education at the Karachi American School. She received a B.A. degree summa cum laude, majoring in Middle Eastern and Asian languages and cultures from Barnard College in New York, United States, in 2004. She received her M.A. in South Asian Studies from the SOAS, University of London in 2005, there she wrote her dissertation on the resistance movement in Pakistan.

== Career ==
=== Publications and politics ===
In 1998, at the age of 15, Bhutto published her first book named Whispers of The Desert. Her second book 8.50 a.m. 8 October 2005 marks the moment of the 2005 Kashmir earthquake; it records accounts of those affected.

Bhutto's family memoir Songs of Blood and Sword was published in 2010. In the book Bhutto accuses her aunt Benazir and her husband Asif Zardari for killing her father Murtaza. The book got mixed to negative reviews from critics for being biased on the history of her family. Several family members have accused her of falsifying information.

In November 2013, her first fictional novel The Shadow Of The Crescent Moon was published. The book had been long-listed in 2014 for the Baileys Women's Prize for Fiction. In 2015 Bhutto's short story titled Democracy, an e-book, under Penguin Books was released.

In 2019, her second novel, The Runaways was published. The book explores three young Muslim men's journey to radicalization. The novel received critical acclaim for its subject. In October of the same year, New Kings of the World: Dispatches from Bollywood, Dizi and K-Pop was published. Tash Aw in the Financial Times described it as a "razor-sharp, intriguing introduction to the various pop phenomena emerging from Asia."

Following the assassination of her aunt, Benazir Bhutto in 2007, there was speculation over her entrance into politics. In an interview, she has stated that for now she prefers to remain active through her activism and writing, rather than through elected office and that she has to "rule a political career out entirely because of the effect of dynasties on Pakistan", referring to the Bhutto family dynasty and its ties to Pakistani politics. Although Bhutto is politically active, she is not affiliated with any political party.

Bhutto also mentors several South Asian writers as the Head of Climate Projects at the SouthAsia Speaks Literary Fellowship.

== Personal life ==
In 2009, it was reported that she was in a relationship with George Clooney, but neither she nor Clooney ever confirmed their relationship.

On 27 April 2023, Bhutto married American national Graham Byra, who adopted the name Gibran following his conversion to Islam. The ceremony was held in Fatima's ancestral home in Karachi. Byra holds a Master of Arts in organizational psychology from Columbia University.

Regarding her religious faith, Bhutto has stated that she is a cultural Muslim and describes herself as a secularist. She has defended Islam on many occasions and supported Muslim women's right to wear burqa.

== Bibliography ==
- Whispers of The Desert Karachi : Oxford University Press, 1998. ISBN 9780195778441, OCLC 633338081
- 8.50 a.m. 8 October 2005 Karachi : Oxford University Press, 2006. ISBN 9780195474039, OCLC 225160670
- Songs of Blood and Sword New York : Nation Books, 2011. ISBN 9781568586762, OCLC 720599400
- The Shadow of the Crescent Moon New York : Penguin Books, 2013. ISBN 9780670922987, OCLC 1062282246
- Democracy (2015)
- The Runaways London : Viking, 2018. ISBN 9780241347003, OCLC 090206617
- New Kings of the World: Dispatches from Bollywood, Dizi, and K-Pop New York : Columbia Global Reports, 2019. ISBN 9781733623704
- Mafroor, Urdu translation of The Runaways by Huma Anwar ISBN 9789696522041
