= Bhutto family mausoleum =

Mausoleum of Bhutto Family
- بھٹو خاندان کا مزار
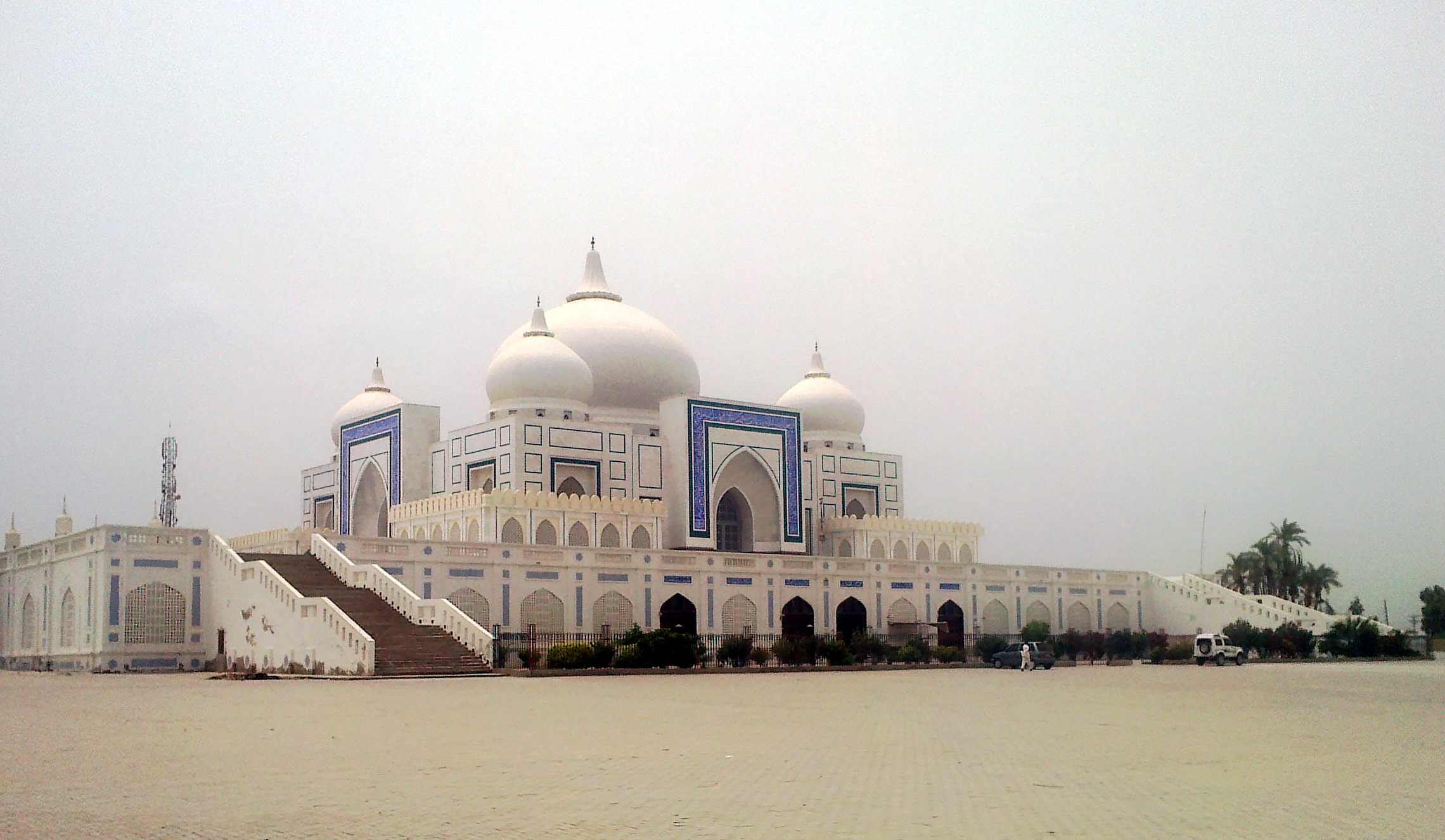

General information
- Type: Mausoleum
- Architectural style: Islamic
- Location: Garhi Khuda Bakhsh, Larkana District, Sindh, Pakistan
- Coordinates: 27°41′41″N 68°20′16″E
- Construction started: 1993

Technical details
- Material: White marble
- Grounds: 65,000 sq.ft

Design and construction
- Architects: Zaigham Jaffery (1993–1997); Waqar Akbar Rizvi (2003)
- Main contractor: National Construction Company

The Bhutto family mausoleum is situated at Garhi Khuda Bakhsh, in Larkana District, Sindh, Pakistan. The mazar contains the graves of the Bhutto family, and is the burial place of Zulfikar, Murtaza, Shahnawaz, Nusrat, and Benazir Bhutto.

Every year on the anniversary of Benazir Bhutto's death, large crowds gather at the site. The Shaheed Bhutto Mazar Committee oversees the arrangements of public gatherings at the venue.

== Construction ==
=== Planning ===
When Zulfikar Ali Bhutto was laid to rest here in 1979, the site was just an ancestral family graveyard dating back to before the British Raj. In 1993, Benazir Bhutto, the-then Prime Minister of Pakistan, approved plans to construct a 56,000-square-foot building at the burial ground. In March 1994, the Government of Sindh approved the construction of a mausoleum which was estimated to cost $9.4 million, while the Karachi Development Authority was to execute it. The total cost was to be equally borne by the federal and the Sindh governments.

The start of the construction was delayed after it was revealed that around 90% of the project site was occupied by the residents of Garhi Khuda Bakhsh. In November 1995, the site was evacuated, but design changes and complications resulted in an increase in the project cost.

=== First phase ===
Khursheed Junejo, former nazim of Larkana, oversaw its construction. A competition to select the best design was held after that. The first phase of construction spanned from 1993 to 1997, with the project being led by architect Zaigham Jaffery. The National Construction Company was awarded a contract for the construction in September 1994.He visited Ruhollah Khomeini and Mustafa Kemal Atatürk's mazars to seek inspiration, and also tried to incorporate elements from the Shalimar Gardens, Lahore. The construction paused for about six years after that, since Benazir Bhutto wanted to incorporate a design more in line with Islamic architecture.

=== Second phase ===
Construction resumed in 2003, after another competition was held to select a new design. The revised design, by Waqar Akbar Rizvi, included five domes and four iwans like the Taj Mahal. The building is covered with white marble. Glazed tiles inscribed with calligraphy and fresco work and based on Sindhi Hala patterns have been used.

== Tombs ==
Those buried here include:

- Shah Nawaz Bhutto
- Shah Nawaz's wife, Lady Khurshid
- Shah Nawaz's three children:
  - Sikander Bhutto
  - Imdad Ali
  - Zulfikar Ali Bhutto
- Zulfikar's children
  - Shahnawaz Bhutto
  - Murtaza Bhutto
  - Benazir Bhutto
- Zulfikar's wives Shireen Amir Begum and Nusrat Bhutto.

== See also ==
- List of mausolea
- Bhutto family
