= Pakistan International Airlines Flight 326 =

1981 airplane hijacking

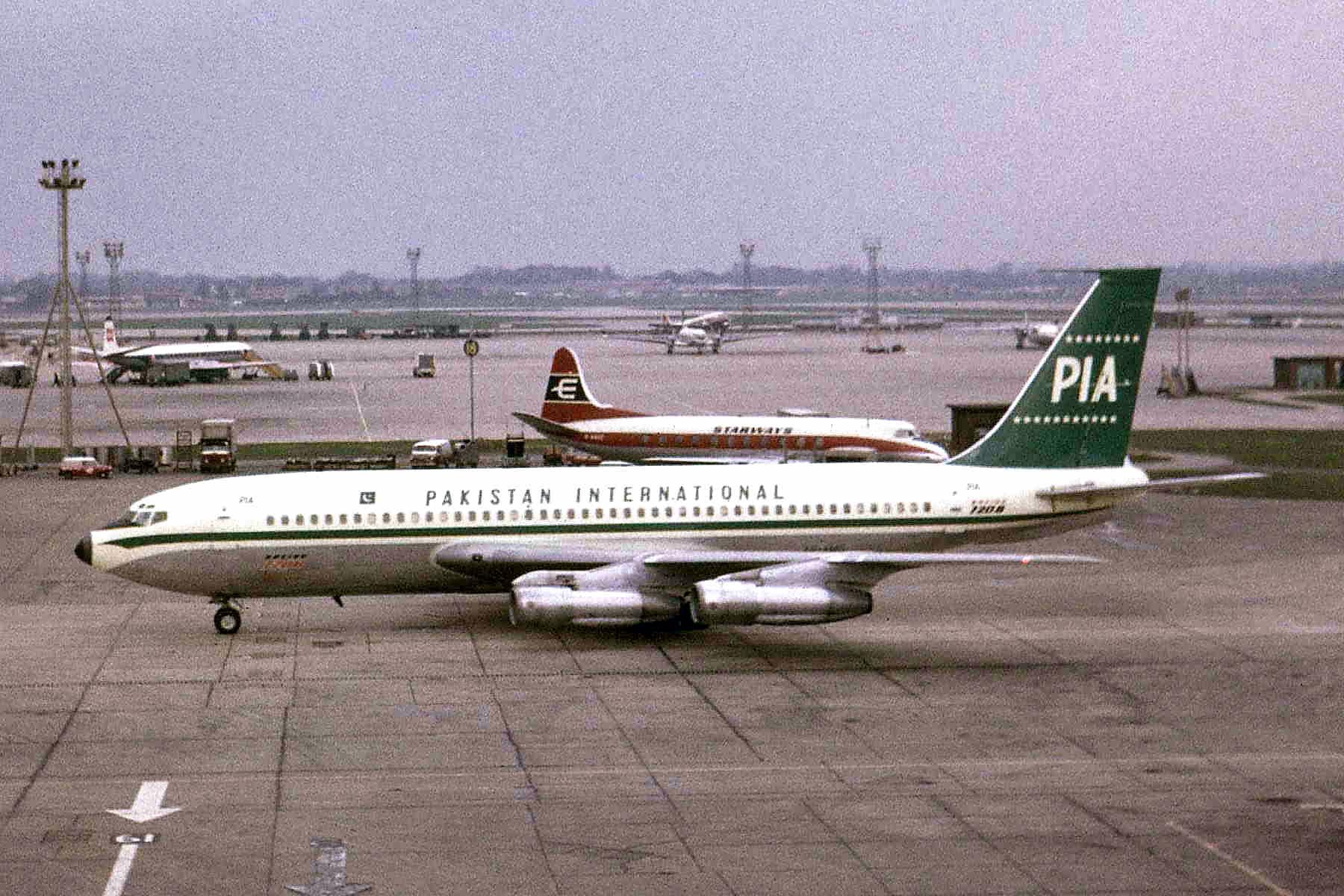
- A Pakistan International Airlines Boeing 720, similar to the aircraft involved

Hijacking
- Date: 2 March 1981
- Summary: Hijacking
- Site: en route

Aircraft
- Aircraft type: Boeing 720
- Operator: Pakistan International Airlines
- IATA flight No.: PK326
- ICAO flight No.: PIA326
- Registration: AP-AZP
- Flight origin: Karachi
- Stopover: Kabul (1st diversion)
- Last stopover: Damascus (2nd diversion)
- Destination: Peshawar
- Occupants: 144
- Passengers: 135 (including 3 hijackers)
- Crew: 9
- Fatalities: 1
- Survivors: 143

Pakistan International Airlines Flight 326 was a domestic scheduled passenger flight that was hijacked by the militant organisation Al Zulfiqar led by Murtaza Bhutto. Bhutto was the son of former Pakistani prime minister Zulfikar Ali Bhutto who was deposed in a coup and later executed by Zia-ul-Haq. It was a routine flight scheduled from Karachi to Peshawar, but the hijackers diverted it to Kabul, Afghanistan, and then Damascus, where the hostage situation ended with the release of prisoners by the Zia-ul-Haq government as demanded by the hijackers.

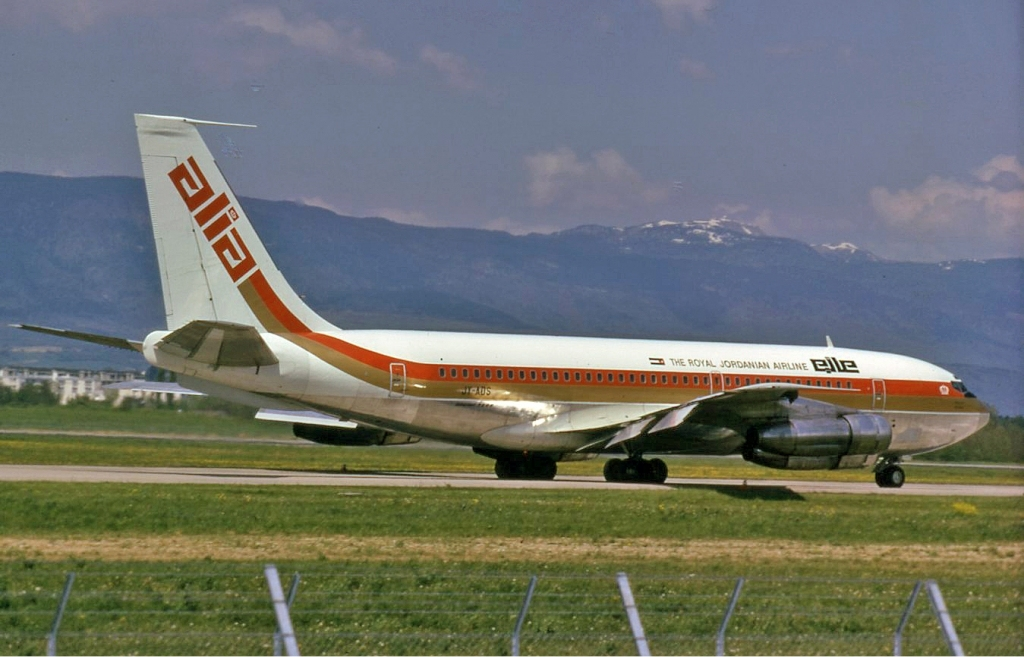
The aircraft involved in 1975, while still in service with Royal Jordanian Airlines

== Details ==
Al-Zulfiqar and PSF activist Salamullah Tipu and three other militants hijacked the plane.

The hijackers demanded that 54 political prisoners be released. These included PPP, PSF, NSF and some Marxist activists. At the time, military dictator Muhammad Zia-ul-Haq had installed himself as the president of Pakistan, after deposing Prime Minister Zulfikar Ali Bhutto in 1977. Zia hesitated to meet the hijackers demands and Tipu executed Major Tariq Rahim, whom he mistakenly believed to be the son of then-martial law administrator General Rahimuddin Khan on the plane accusing him of being a part of Zia's coup against Bhutto.

Some passengers were let off, but others were not, most notably Major Tariq Rahim, who al-Zulfikar leader and Prime Minister Bhutto's son Murtaza Bhutto felt had abandoned his father Zulfikar Ali Bhutto. The Pakistani diplomat was shot, and his body was thrown onto the tarmac. At first, the Zia-ul-Haq regime resisted negotiating with the hijackers. However, they eventually gave in, and released more than 50 prisoners, which included members of PPP, PSF, and NSF.

The plane was first forced to land at Kabul airport, and was then flown to Damascus. Although undertaken to 'avenge Zulfiqar Ali Bhutto's hanging by Zia', the hijacking was at once condemned by the young co-chairperson of the PPP, Benazir Bhutto, who was languishing in a Karachi jail.

Around 50 prisoners were eventually released by the Zia-ul-Haq regime. Tipu was thrown in a Kabul prison and eventually executed by firing squad in 1984 for murdering an Afghan national. His body was never returned, and he is said to have been buried somewhere near Kabul.

According to Vasili Mitrokhin, before the hijacking event Murtaza visited Kabul and met then head of KHAD Mohammad Najibullah on three occasions, together agreeing to fight the Pakistani regime through a plane hijacking in late 1980. Then during the hijacking when the plane was on the Kabul tarmac, Najibullah secretly met Murtaza in disguise at the plane. The KGB offered advice to Najibullah on exploiting the situation politically against Pakistan. Murtaza requested additional Al-Zulfiqar members to join them and Najibullah provided them with money, explosives, and weapons.

== Aftermath ==
The successful hijacking not only saw many of the released men join AZO, but the organization also welcomed a whole new batch of recruits who travelled across Pakistan's tribal areas and entered Afghanistan.

AZO described itself as a socialist guerrilla outfit, but its main purpose was avenging Bhutto's death. The organization was mostly made up of young PSF militants, and members of small left-wing groups such as the Communist Mazdoor Kissan Party.

One of the three American hostages on the flight, Fred Hubbell, ran for the position of governor of the state of Iowa in the 2018 election.

Flight attendant Naila Nazir was awarded the Flight Safety Foundation Heroism Award in 1985 for refusing to flee the airliner when the hijackers boarded the plane.

== See also ==
- Spillover of Soviet - Afghan war in Pakistan
