= Mohammad Waleed =

Pakistani cricketer (born 1995)

Personal information
- Born: 28 December 1995 (age 30)
- Source: Cricinfo, 22 September 2018

Mohammad Waleed (born 28 December 1995) is a Pakistani cricketer. He made his List A debut for Lahore Eagles in the 2012–13 National One Day Cup on 7 March 2013.
