= The Shadow of the Crescent Moon =

2013 novel by Fatima Bhutto

The Shadow Of The Crescent Moon
- First edition
- Author: Fatima Bhutto
- Language: English
- Genre: Fiction
- Published: 2013
- Publisher: Penguin Press
- Pages: 240
- ISBN: 9780670085705

The Shadow Of The Crescent Moon is a 2013 novel written by Fatima Bhutto. The novel is set over the course of one morning in a small town in Pakistan. The book was long-listed in 2014 for the Baileys Women's Prize for Fiction.

== Review ==
Lucy Beresford published a positive review in The Daily Telegraph by stating that the book offers an under-reported view of ordinary Pakistani women as strong and assertive. Beresford also wrote "The Shadow of the Crescent Moon captures so well is not just the trauma of war, but also the conflicts of contemporary Pakistanis, torn between remaining faithful to the legacy of previous generations, and their own dreams of choosing their own destiny".

Financial Times also published a positive review by Michael Prodger who noted "This [book], though, is not a geopolitical tract but a human story, with love as well as ideology. Bhutto blends the two adroitly".

New York Times published a mixed review by Lorraine Adams who stated "it's hard not to notice that she's [author] still learning the difficult art of story-making. Too often, she tries to build momentum through portentous foreshadowing and cryptic dialogue. She frequently withholds information from the reader to heighten the mystery, a technique that works best when applied sparingly. The innate tension and forward motion that come from setting a novel on a single morning — a fine premise — is squandered by a few too many flashbacks."

Razeshta Sethna publish a positive review in Dawn and wrote "Bhutto smartens her fiction by using her characters and their stories to explore the souring relationship between Pakistan and America and its implications at the height of the "war on terror".

The Express Tribune published a mixed review by Samra Muslim, who noted "A major disappointment is Bhutto's writing which is inconsistent and tends to vary from poetic to breezy, to extremely perceptive."
