= Al Zulfiqar =

Far-left terrorist organization

Al-Zulfikar
- الذُوالفِقار
- Founder: Murtaza Bhutto
- Founded: 1979; 47 years ago
- Dissolved: 1988; 38 years ago
- Country: Pakistan
- Headquarters: Kabul, Afghanistan
- Part of: Pakistan People's Party

Al-Zulfikar was a far-left militant organization formed in 1979 by Pakistani politician Murtaza Bhutto. Named after his father and former Pakistani prime minister Zulfikar Ali Bhutto, the group opposed the government of military dictator Muhammad Zia-ul-Haq, who had deposed Zulfikar in 1977 and installed himself as the president of Pakistan.

Al-Zulfiqar was formed to avenge Bhutto's killing by means of armed struggle against Zia-ul-Haq. Zia had deposed the Bhutto regime after mass protests across Pakistan that were related to the dissatisfaction of the masses with the rule of Bhutto (mismanagement of East Pakistan, alleged links of Bhutto to political murders, corruption, economic stagnation as a result of nationalization, deteriorating education system, etc.) in a military coup in July 1977.

Bhutto was hanged by the Zia regime. Bhutto's two sons, Murtaza Bhutto and Shahnawaz Bhutto went into exile in Afghanistan which was then being ruled by a Soviet-backed communist government. There the two sons formed the Al-Zulfiqar along with hundreds of Pakistan Peoples Party militants who had escaped Zia's persecution.

== History ==
The hijacking went on for thirteen days in which Lieutenant Tariq Rahim was shot, the hijackers mistakenly believing he was the son of General Rahimuddin Khan, the martial law administrator of Balochistan. This forced the Zia regime to accept the demands of the hijackers of releasing dozens of Pakistan Peoples Party and other leftist political prisoners languishing in Pakistani jails.

The hijacking was condemned by Bhutto's daughter, Benazir Bhutto, who was under house arrest in Pakistan and leading a political movement against the Zia dictatorship. The Al-Zulfiqar also attempted to assassinate Zia on a number of occasions and it tried to bomb a vigil Karachi held in honour of Pope John Paul II who was visiting Pakistan in 1980.

Cracks started to appear in Al-Zulfiqar after Murtaza Bhutto and one of his most trusted aides, Raja Anwar, developed differences. Raja wanted to return to Pakistan and help Benazir Bhutto in her political struggle against the Zia dictatorship. Murtaza asked his main hit man, Salamullah Tipu, to assassinate Raja and his supporters. Tipu was a former leftist student leader who had joined Al-Zulfiqar in 1980. Raja was thrown into a Kabul jail on Murtaza's request and eventually so was Tipu when in 1984 his wild antics became a security threat to Kabul and Murtaza.

Murtaza folded the organization's operations in Kabul when his younger brother, Shahnawaz Bhutto, died suddenly in Nice, in the French Riviera, in 1985, allegedly from poisoning. Both Benazir and Murtaza insisted that he was poisoned by his young Afghan wife who had become an agent of the Pakistani intelligence agency, the ISI.

Murtaza eventually moved to Syria and continued low-level Al-Zulfiqar operations from there.

== See also ==
- Left-wing terrorism
