= Muhammad Ali Khan Bhutto =

Pakistani politician

Member of the Provincial Assembly of Sindh
- In office 29 May 2013 – 28 May 2018

Personal details
- Born: 5 June 1966 (age 59) Garhi Khuda Bakhsh
- Party: Pakistan Peoples Party

Muhammad Ali Khan Bhutto is a Pakistani politician who had been a Member of the Provincial Assembly of Sindh, from May 2013 to May 2018.

== Early life and education ==
He was born on 5 June 1966 in Garhi Khuda Bakhsh.

He has degree of Bachelors of Arts from Shah Abdul Latif University.

== Political career ==
He was elected to the Provincial Assembly of Sindh as a candidate of Pakistan Peoples Party from Constituency PS-37 LARKANA-III in the 2013 Pakistani general election.
