= Hammad Tariq =

Pakistani cricketer (born 1980)

Personal information
- Born: 22 December 1980 (age 45); Bahawalpur, Pakistan
- Batting: Left-handed
- Bowling: Right arm Medium
- Source: Cricinfo, 14 November 2015

Hammad Tariq (born 22 December 1980) is a Pakistani first-class cricketer who played for Multan cricket team.
