= Shaheed Mohtarama Benazir Bhutto International Cricket Stadium =

Cricket ground in Sindh

- شہید محترمہ بینظیر بھٹو انٹرنیشنل کرکٹ سٹیڈیم
- Interactive map of Shaheed Mohtarama Benazir Bhutto International Cricket Stadium
- Location: Garhi Khuda Bakhsh, Sindh, Pakistan
- Coordinates: 27.692187652202055°N 68.33640939535195°E
- Owner: Pakistan Cricket Board
- Operator: Pakistan Cricket Board
- Capacity: 10,000
- Type: Stadium
- Surface: Grass

Construction
- Opened: 26 December 2012; 13 years ago

Shaheed Mohtarama Benazir Bhutto International Cricket Stadium is a cricket ground in Garhi Khuda Bakhsh, Sindh, Pakistan. It was inaugurated by then-President Asif Ali Zardari on 26 December 2012. The stadium was named after the late Benazir Bhutto, who twice served as the Prime Minister of Pakistan.

In 2013, the stadium hosted seven matches of the Faisal Bank One Day Cup, and four matches of the President's Cup One Day Tournament. It also hosted 12 matches of the Inter-Region/Department under-19 tournament from 2013 to 2015.

The first match played on this ground was in March 2013 when Hyderabad Hawks took on Quetta Bears.

== See also ==
- List of stadiums by capacity
- List of stadiums in Pakistan
- List of cricket grounds in Pakistan
