= Bhutto family =

Pakistani political family

Bhutto family ڀُٽو خاندان (Sindhi) بھُٹو خاندان (Urdu)
- Political family
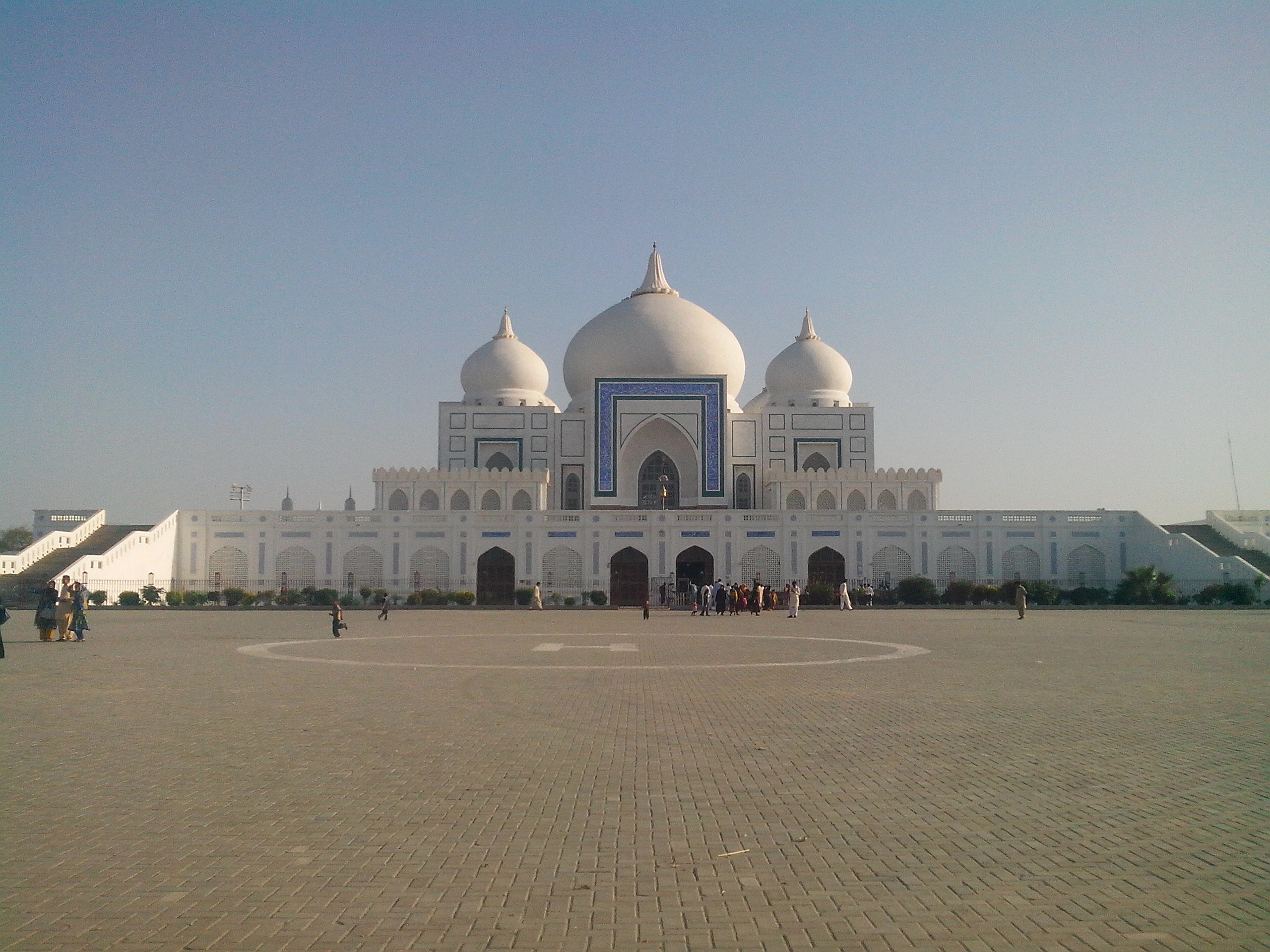
- Bhutto family mausoleum at Garhi Khuda Baksh
- Parent family: Bhutto clan
- Country: Pakistan
- Current region: Karachi, Sindh, Pakistan
- Etymology: Bhutto (clan name from the Bhatti tribe)
- Origin: Ratodero Taluka, Larkana, Sindh, Pakistan
- Founded: c. 1862; 164 years ago (Note: With the birth of Ghulam Murtaza Bhutto)
- Founder: Ghulam Murtaza Bhutto
- Current head: disputed (Note: While Ameer Buksh Bhutto is the chief of the Bhutto clan, his status as the head of the family is disputed.)
- Seat: Garhi Khuda Baksh
- Titles: President of Pakistan; Prime Minister of Pakistan
- Members: Full list: Ghulam Murtaza Bhutto; Shah Nawaz Bhutto; Khurshid Begum; Nabi Bux Khan Bhutto; Mumtaz Begum Sahiba Bhutto; Muhammad Mustafa Khan Bahadur; Zulfikar Ali Bhutto; Nusrat Ispahani; Imdad Ali Bhutto; Sikander Ali Bhutto; Mashoq Bhutto; Mumtaz Ali Khan Bhutto; Murtaza Bhutto; Ghinwa Bhutto; Fouzia Fasihuddin Bhutto; Benazir Bhutto; Shahnawaz Bhutto; Raehana Fasihuddin Bhutto; Sanam Bhutto; Ameer Bux Bhutto; Ali Haider Bhutto; Sassi Bhutto; Fatima Bhutto; Zulfikar Ali Bhutto Jr.
- Connected families: Zardari family
- Distinctions: Political prominence within the Pakistan People's Party
- Traditions: Shia Islam
- Estate: Garhi Khuda Baksh
- Website: bhutto.org

The Bhutto family (Note: /ˈbuːtoʊ/ BOO-toh; Sindhi: ڀُٽو خاندان, romanized: Bhuṭo khāndān; Urdu: بھُٹو خاندان, romanized: Bhuṭo khāndān) is a Pakistani political family of Sindhi background, belonging to the Bhutto clan. The Bhuttos have played a prominent role in Pakistani politics and government. The Bhuttos have been settled in Sindh for over three centuries and have held the leadership of the Pakistan People's Party since its inception in 1967.

Two members of the family, Zulfikar and Benazir Bhutto, have been the Prime Ministers of Pakistan, whereas Asif Ali Zardari, Benazir's widower, has been the President of Pakistan twice, from 2008 to 2013 and from 2024 to present.

== History ==
According to James P. Sterba of The New York Times, Bhutto family traces its origins to Rajput community from the region now known as Rajasthan, India. The family converted to Islam centuries ago and migrated southwest to the area near Larkana, in present-day Pakistan, along with their livestock. Mitho Khan Bhutto, an ancestor of the family, was the first to settle in the region. However, it was his descendant, Sardar Pirbuksh Bhutto, who expanded the family's landholdings. As a tribal chief, Sardar Pirbuksh Bhutto accumulated around 40,000 acres of land through various means, including military conquests, land purchases, and by providing labor for British canal construction projects in return for land grants.

According to another account by historian Stanley Wolpert, the Bhuttos originally migrated to Sindh in the early 18th century from the neighboring region of Gujratra (now Rajasthan in India). 'Sehto' was the first member of the Bhutto family, who converted to Islam during Mughal emperor Aurangzeb's reign. Following the conversion to Islam he took the title of Khan, becoming Sehto Khan. In Sindh, the Bhuttos under Sehto Khan first settled at Ratodero, a few miles north of Larkana.

Shah Nawaz Bhutto, a direct descendant of Sehto Khan, came to prominence during the British Raj as a dewan of the princely state of Junagadh in the southwestern part of Gujarat in India. During the Partition of India in 1947, the Muslim Nawab of Junagarh wanted to accede his state to the newly created Pakistan but faced a rebellion by the Hindu majority population of Junagadh. The Indian government thwarted the accession to Pakistan, and the Bhuttos had to flee to Sindh in modern-day Pakistan. Shah Nawaz Bhutto moved to Larkana District in Sindh, where his land-ownership made him one of the wealthiest and most influential persons in Sindh.

According to Benzair Bhutto their branch of the family was directly descended by famous tribal chief of Bhuttos, Sardar dodo Khan

Beginning the political dynasty, Shah Nawaz's third son Zulfikar Ali Bhutto (1928-1979) founded the Pakistan People's Party (PPP) in 1967 and served as the fourth President and later the ninth Prime Minister. He married an Iranian of Kurdish origin named Nusrat Ispahani. His daughter, Benazir (1953-2007), also served as Prime Minister, while his two sons, Shahnawaz Bhutto and Mir Murtaza Bhutto, were assassinated. Shahnawaz's daughter, Sassi Bhutto and Murtaza's children, Fatima Bhutto and Zulfikar Ali Bhutto Jr., are settled abroad along with their aunt Sanam Bhutto (Zulfikar Bhutto's second daughter). After Benazir's assassination on 27 December 2007, her son Bilawal Bhutto Zardari became co-chairperson in 2007 along with her widower Asif Ali Zardari.

== Family tree ==
Mohammad Khan
Fatah Mohammad Khan
Mittho Khan
Mohammad Qasim Khan
Abro Khan
Sahato Khan
Pir Bux Khan
Doda Khan
Khuda Bux Bhutto
Ghulam Murtaza Bhutto (1862 – 1940)
Shah Nawaz Bhutto (1888 – 1957)	Khursheed Begum (Lakhi Bai)	Nabi Bux Khan Bhutto (1887 – 1965)
Mumtaz Begum Sahiba Bhutto	Muhammad Mustafa Khan Bahadur	Zulfikar Ali Bhutto (1928 – 1979)	Nusrat Ispahani Bhutto (1929 – 2011)	Imdad Ali Bhutto	Sikander Ali Bhutto	Mashoq Bhutto	Mumtaz Ali Khan Bhutto (1933 – 2021)
Shahnawaz Bhutto (1958 – 1985)	Raehana Fassihuddin Bhutto	Sanam Bhutto (1957- )	Nasir Hussain	Fowzia Fassihuddin Bhutto	Murtaza Bhutto (1954 – 1996)	Ghinwa Itaoui Bhutto	Benazir Bhutto (1953 – 2007)	Asif Ali Zardari (1955- )	Ameer Bux Bhutto (1954-)	Ali Haider Bhutto
Sassi Bhutto	Shahmir Hussain	Azadi Hussain	Fatima Bhutto (1982- )	Zulfikar Ali Bhutto Jr. (1990- )	Bilawal Bhutto (1988- )	Bakhtawar Bhutto (1990- )	Aseefa Bhutto (1993- )

not direct relatives (only related by marriage)
- Titles

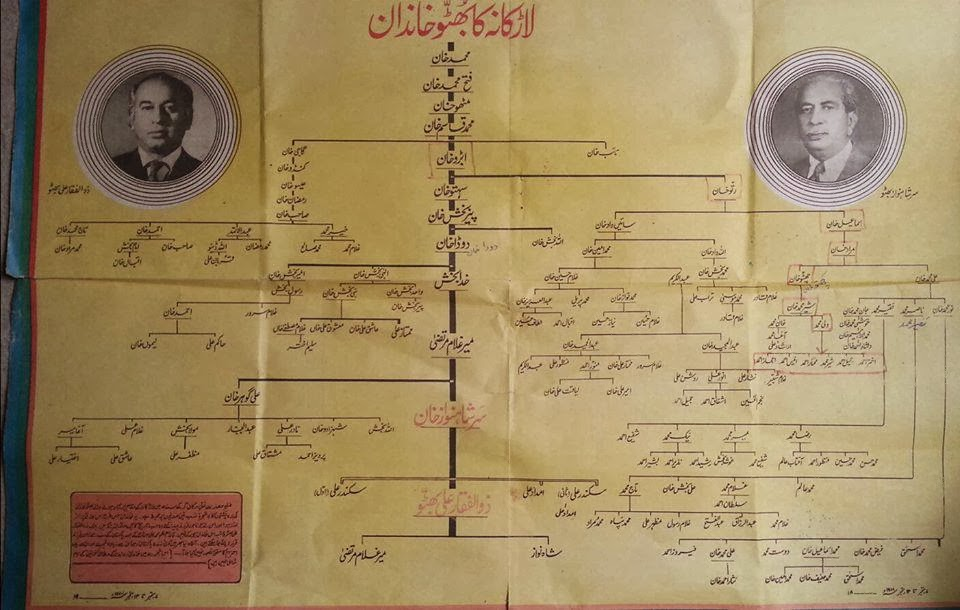
Family tree of Bhutto family

According to other authors, the family migrated from Sarsa to Hissar.

- Founding father Doda Khan of Pir Bakhsh Bhutto
- Khuda Bakhsh Bhutto, Ameer Bakhsh Bhutto, Illahi Bux Bhutto (Honorary Magistrate Larkana District)
- Ghulam Murtaza Bhutto, Rasul Bakhsh Bhutto
- Sir Shah Nawaz Bhutto (Member Bombay Council)
- Sardar Wahid Baksh Bhutto (Member, Central Legislative Assembly and Bombay Council, Chief of tribe)
- Nawab Nabi Bakhsh Bhutto (Member, Central Legislative Assembly)
- Khan Bahadur Ahmad Khan Bhutto

== See also ==
- Zardari family
- Shia Islam
