= Bhatti =

Rajput clan

Bhatti‌
- Religions: Hinduism; Sikhism; Islam
- Languages: Punjabi; Sindhi
- Country: India; Pakistan
- Region: Punjab; Sindh; Rajasthan; Haryana‌; Azad Kashmir
- Ethnicity: Punjabi; Sindhi

Bhatti is a Punjabi and Sindhi clan of Rajputs. They are linked to the Bhatias and Bhuttos, all of whom claim to originate from the Hindu Bhati Rajputs. They claim descent from the Chandravanshi dynasty.

== Etymology ==
Bhatti is considered a Punjabi and Sindhi form of Bhati.

== History ==
The Bhattis are Punjabi and Sindhi. The Bhattis are descended from a common ancestor, Rao Bhati, a 3rd-century Hindu monarch. The Muslim Bhattis had control over Bhatner and settlements around it. The Bhattis later lost Bhatner to the Rathores of Bikaner, who renamed Bhatner as Hanumangarh. In the years preceding the Indian rebellion of 1857, the British East India Company assigned pioneering Jat peasants proprietary rights over forested lands frequented by the Rajputs (Bhattis), Gurjars, Banjaras, Passis, and other wandering pastoral groups in Delhi and western Haryana regions.

== Sources ==
- Bayly, Christopher Alan (1990). Indian Society and the Making of the British Empire (Reprinted ed.). Cambridge University Press. pp. 143, 188–189. ISBN 978-0-521-38650-0.
- Davies, C. Collin (2012), "Bhaṭṭi", Encyclopaedia of Islam, Second Edition, Brill, doi:10.1163/1573-3912_islam_sim_1385
