= Imran Ahmed (cricketer) =

Bangladeshi cricketer (born 1981)

Personal information
- Born: 1 April 1981 (age 45); Mymensingh, Bangladesh
- Batting: Right-handed
- Bowling: Right arm offbreak

Domestic team information
- Years: Team
- 2011/12: Dhaka Division
- 2000/01–2009/10: Barisal Division
- 2003/04: Bangladesh Under-23s
- 1998/99: Bangladesh Cricket Board XI
- First-class debut: 22 November 2000 Barisal Division v Khulna Division
- Last First-class: 28 November 2011 Dhaka Division v Rajshahi Division
- List A debut: 4 April 1999 Bangladesh Cricket Board XI v Karachi Whites
- Last List A: 17 January 2009 Barisal Division v Chittagong Division

Career statistics
Competition	FC	LA
Matches	82	74
Runs scored	3746	1810
Batting average	25.65	25.13
100s/50s	5/15	1/9
Top score	177	115
Balls bowled	738	545
Wickets	5	12
Bowling average	76.60	34.50
5 wickets in innings	–	–
10 wickets in match	–	–
Best bowling	2/37	2/23
Catches/stumpings	39/–	25/–
- Source: Cricket Archive, 15 November 2016

Imran Ahmed is a First-class and List A cricketer from Bangladesh. He was born on 1 April 1981 in Mymensingh, made his debut for Barisal Division in 2000/01 and proved a stalwart member of the team through to the 2009/10 season. He also appeared for Bangladesh Under-23s in 2003/04, Bangladesh in 1998/99 and the Bangladesh Youth XI in 1999/00. A right-handed batsman, he has scored 5 first-class hundreds and 15 fifties with a best of 177 against Chittagong Division. He also scored 152* against Rajshahi Division. He has taken 5 first-class wickets with his occasional off breaks. His best first-class century, 115, came against Chittagong Division.
