= Zeeshan Butt =

Pakistani cricketer (born 1978)

Personal information
- Born: 20 February 1978 (age 48); Faisalabad, Pakistan

Domestic team information
- Years: Team
- 1995–2003: Faisalabad

Career statistics
Competition	FC	LA	T20
Matches	62	33	7
Runs scored	3,241	1,138	31
Batting average	34.84	40.64	7.75
100s/50s	6/16	1/9	0/0
Top score	221	170*	20
Balls bowled	1,355	96	12
Wickets	26	2	0
Bowling average	27.80	47.00	–
5 wickets in innings	0	0	–
10 wickets in match	0	0	–
Best bowling	3/14	2/18	–
Catches/stumpings	38/–	18/–	3/–
- Source: Cricinfo, 1 January 2019

Zeeshan Butt (born 20 February 1978) is a Pakistani former first-class cricketer who played for Faisalabad cricket team.
