= Ghinwa Bhutto =

Pakistani politician

- غنویٰ بھٹو غنوا ڀٽو غنوة بوتو
- Born: Lebanon
- Spouse: Murtaza Bhutto (m. 1989; died 1996)
- Children: Zulfikar Ali Bhutto Jr
- Relatives: Fatima Bhutto (step-daughter); Bhutto family (in-laws)

Ghinwa Bhutto (Urdu: غنویٰ بھٹو, Sindhi: غنوا ڀٽو, Arabic: غنوة بوتو; born Ghinwa Itaoui) is a Lebanese-Pakistani politician and the chairperson of Pakistan Peoples Party-Shaheed Bhutto. She is the widow of Murtaza Bhutto, and the daughter-in-law and sister-in-law of the former Prime Ministers of Pakistan, Zulfikar Ali Bhutto and Benazir Bhutto, respectively.

== Background ==
Murtaza Bhutto and his daughter Fatima spent time in exile in Syria, where Murtaza first met Ghinwa. Ghinwa had fled from the Lebanese Civil War back home and migrated to Syria, where she used to give ballet classes in the basement of a church. Fatima was one of her students. Murtaza and Ghinwa would later marry in 1989, and had a son Zulfikar Ali Bhutto Jr in 1990.

Ghinwa has been estranged from the powerful Bhutto family ever since she accused her sister-in-law Benazir Bhutto and her husband Asif Ali Zardari of conspiracy to the 1996 murder of her husband, and also accused Benazir and Zardari of corruption. Zardari was arrested as a suspect in the murder of Murtaza, but he was later released due to lack of evidence. Her husband's murderers were never brought to justice.

== Politics ==
In 1997, Ghinwa staked a claim to the Bhutto political legacy. She formed the Pakistan Peoples Party (Shaheed Bhutto) (PPP-SB), becoming the chairperson of the party, and ran for election from Larkana on 3 February 1997. Benazir convinced her mother Nusrat Bhutto, then president of the Pakistan Peoples Party, to run against her. Though her opponent suffered from Alzheimer's disease, Ghinwa was defeated.

Ghinwa lives in the Bhutto family home in Karachi with her son Zulfikar Ali Bhutto Jr (named after his grandfather Zulfikar Ali Bhutto) and her step-daughter Fatima Bhutto. Prior to marrying Murtaza, Ghinwa worked as a ballet dancer and teacher.

In 2002, Pakistani election authorities rejected her candidacy for 10 October election. Ghinwa was rejected on the grounds of not possessing the required minimum academic qualification of a university degree. In August 2007, Ghinwa Bhutto passed the BA exams from Punjab University in the First Division with 526 marks. Ghinwa, roll # 86604, appeared as a private candidate. To be eligible to contest elections, Ghinwa chose to take the Punjab University BA exam because the results were to be declared by the end of August, before the elections.

After the first suicide attack following Benazir's return to Pakistan in October 2007, Ghinwa remarked: "I think she has invited trouble herself." However, when Benazir was assassinated on 27 December 2007, Ghinwa put their differences aside. She attended the funeral with her step-daughter, Fatima Bhutto.

== See also ==
- Bhutto family
- Politics of Pakistan
- Pakistan Peoples Party (Shaheed Bhutto)
