= Nawaz Ahmed =

Pakistani cricketer (born 1986)

Personal information
- Full name: Nawaz Ahmed Jan
- Born: 10 December 1986 (age 39); Peshawar, North-West Frontier Province, Pakistan
- Batting: Right-handed
- Bowling: Right-arm medium-fast
- Role: Batsman

Domestic team information
- Years: Team
- Peshawar Panthers
- North West Frontier Province Panthers
- Peshawar
- Pakistan Ordnance Factories
- Pakistan Television
- Khan Research Laboratories

Career statistics
Competition	First-class	List A	Twenty20
Matches	46	33	9
Runs scored	1,844	1,088	151
Batting average	22.48	36.26	18.87
100s/50s	2/12	1/8	0/2
Top score	111*	167	53*
Balls bowled	1,183	339	6
Wickets	15	10	0
Bowling average	43.73	32.20	–
5 wickets in innings	0	0	0
10 wickets in match	0	0	0
Best bowling	4/14	3/44	–
Catches/stumpings	33/–	6/–	3/–
- Source: Cricinfo, 1 May 2026

Nawaz Ahmed Jan (born 10 December 1986) is a Pakistani former cricketer. Ahmed was a right-handed batsman who bowled right-arm medium-fast. He was born in Peshawar, North-West Frontier Province, and played domestic cricket in Pakistan for Peshawar, Peshawar Panthers, North West Frontier Province Panthers, Pakistan Ordnance Factories, Pakistan Television and Khan Research Laboratories.

Ahmed made his first-class debut for Peshawar against Sialkot in the 2005–06 Quaid-e-Azam Trophy. One of his earliest notable first-class innings came in the 2007–08 Quaid-e-Azam Trophy, when he scored 109 against Lahore Shalimar at Arbab Niaz Stadium.

His most notable List A innings came in March 2013, when he scored a career-best 167 for Peshawar Panthers against Faisalabad Wolves in the Faysal Bank One-Day Cup. Chasing 277, he struck 22 fours and three sixes and guided Peshawar Panthers to a six-wicket win with seven overs to spare. He also played in Pakistan's domestic Twenty20 competitions for Peshawar-based sides, making 151 runs in nine matches with two half-centuries.

Late in his career, playing for Khan Research Laboratories against United Bank Limited in October 2017, Ahmed produced the best bowling figures of his first-class career, taking 4 for 14 in the first innings at Rawalpindi. Overall, he played in 46 first-class matches, scoring 1,844 runs at a batting average of 22.48, with two centuries and 12 half-centuries. In List A cricket, he played 33 matches and scored 1,088 runs at 36.26, including one century and eight fifties.
