= Misbah Khan (cricketer) =

Pakistani cricketer (born 1986)

Personal information
- Born: 1 December 1986 (age 39); Karachi, Pakistan

Misbah Khan (born 1 December 1986) is a Pakistani first-class cricketer who played for the Karachi cricket team.
