= Ameer Buksh Khan Bhutto =

Pakistani politician

Ameer Buksh Khan Bhutto (, Urdu: امیر بخش خان بھٹو) is a Pakistani politician. He is a former president of the Pakistan Tehreek-e-Insaf Sindh and an ex-Member of the Sindh Assembly. He is the son of Mumtaz Bhutto.

He holds a Bachelor of Arts degree in Politics, Economics & Law from the University of Buckingham and a Master of Philosophy degree in International Relations from Cambridge University. He wrote a thesis titled "Of Knights and Harlots: The Role of the Superpowers in the 1971 Indo-Pakistan War." He has also written some articles published in English and Sindhi newspapers and magazines in Pakistan.

He ran for the seat of the Provincial Assembly of Sindh twice, in the 2002 general election and again in the 2008 election but was defeated twice by Muhammad Ayaz Soomro.

On 10 November 2017, Ameer Buksh Khan Bhutto while meeting with Shah Mehmood Qureishi, announced he was joining Pakistan Tehreek-e-Insaf.

He left PTI in 2023.

== See also ==
- Bhutto
- Bhutto family
