= Wahid Baksh Bhutto =

Pakistani politician

Wahid Baksh Bhutto (1898 – 25 December 1931) was a landowner of Sindh, and an elected representative to the Central Legislative Assembly of India.

== Books for further reading ==
- Rashidi, Ali Muhammad. Uhay Deehan, Uhay Sheehan.
- Wolpert, Stanley (1993). Zulfi Bhutto of Pakistan: His Life and Times. Oxford University Press. ISBN 978-0-19-507661-5.
- Bombay Council Debates, 1931.
- Indian Annual Register, 1927–1931.
- List of members the Legislative Assemblies of 1927 and 1935.
- Proceedings of the Central Legislative Assembly, 1926–1931.
