= Garhi Khuda Bakhsh =

Village in Pakistan

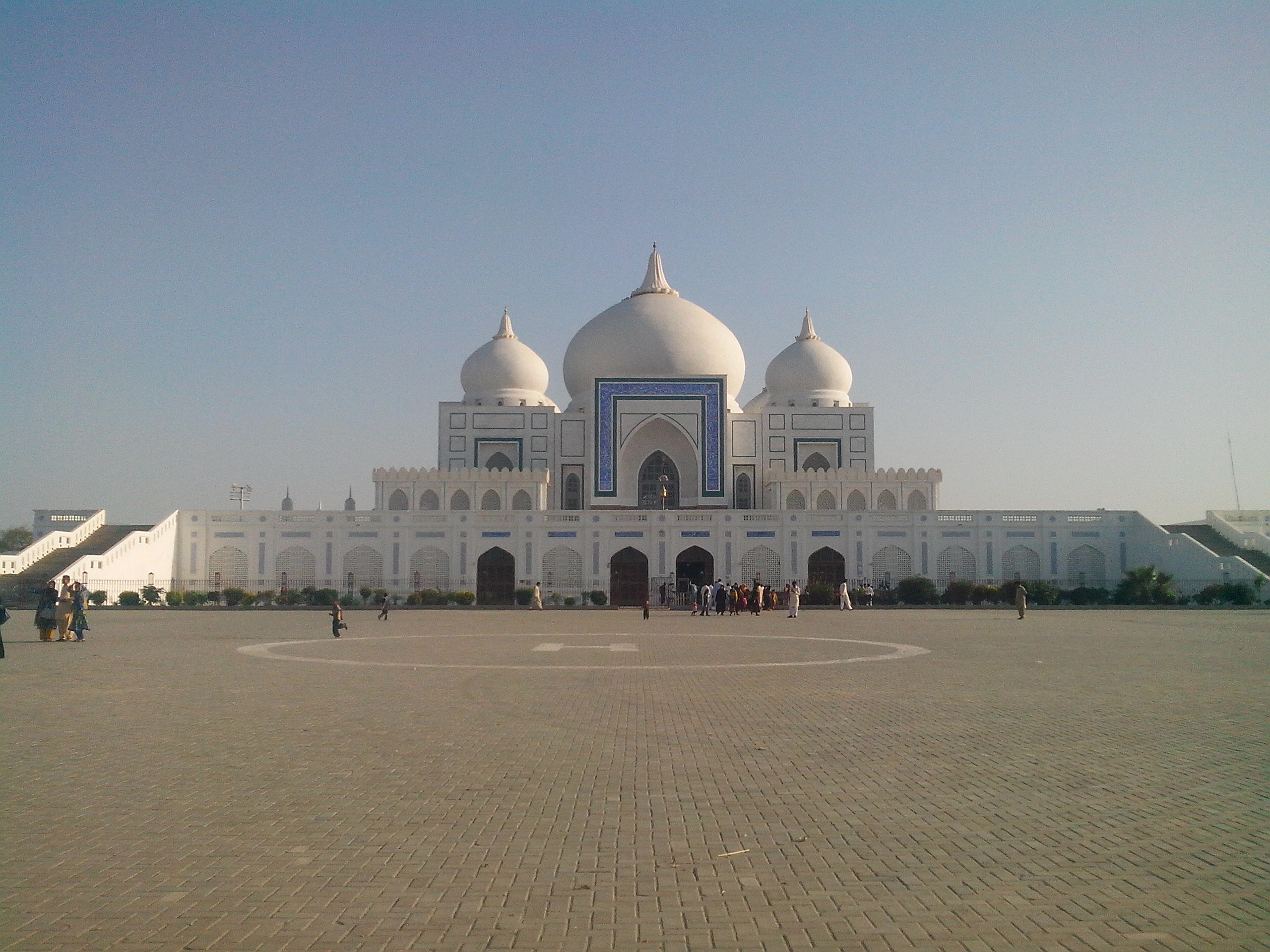
Bhutto family Mausoleum contains the graves of Zulfiqar Ali Bhutto, Shahnawaz Bhutto, Murtaza Bhutto, Benazir Bhutto and several members of the family in Garhi Khuda Bakhsh, Sindh, Pakistan

Garhi Khuda Bakhsh (Sindhi: ڳڙهي خدابخش) is a village in Ratodero Taluka near Naudero, in Larkana District of Sindh province, Pakistan. It contains the family graveyard of the Bhutto family and is the burial place of Zulfiqar, Murtaza, and Benazir Bhutto, in the mausoleum. It was founded by Khuda Bakhsh Khan Bhutto. This was a family of feudal lords that headed the Bhutto clan.

Zulfiqar Ali Bhutto, the father of Benazir, was buried in the village after being executed following a military coup that removed him from power. On 27 October 2007, nine days after the first assassination attempt against her after returning from exile, Benazir Bhutto arrived in the village amidst tight security to visit her father's mausoleum—she was greeted by 4,000 supporters in the village.

Two months later on 28 December, following her assassination, she was buried in the mausoleum where hundreds of thousands of mourners had gathered. The following year on what would have been her 55th birthday, party activists arranged a function to pay tribute to her.

== See also ==
- Bhutto family mausoleum
- Mausoleum of Zulfiqar Ali Bhutto
- Shaheed Mohtarama Benazir Bhutto International Cricket Stadium
