= Shahnawaz Bhutto =

Pakistani politician

- Born: 21 November 1958; Karachi, West Pakistan, Pakistan
- Died: 18 July 1985 (aged 26); Nice, France
- Resting place: Bhutto Family Mausoleum, Larkana, Sindh, Pakistan
- Known for: Political Activism against the Military Regime of Zia-Ul-Haq
- Political party: Pakistan Peoples Party
- Movement: Al-Zulfiqar
- Spouse: Rehana Fasihuddin (m. 1980)
- Children: 1
- Parent(s): Zulfiqar Ali Bhutto; Begum Nusrat Bhutto
- Relatives: Bhutto family

Shahnawaz Bhutto (21 November 1958 – 18 July 1985; Sindhi: شاھنواز ڀٽو) was the son of Zulfiqar Ali Bhutto, the former President and Prime Minister of Pakistan from 1971 to 1977 and Begum Nusrat Bhutto, who was of Kurdish descent. Shahnawaz Bhutto was the youngest of Bhutto's four children, including the former Prime Minister of Pakistan Benazir Bhutto. Shahnawaz was schooled in Pakistan (at the Aitchison College in Lahore and Rawalpindi American School - renamed the International School of Islamabad (ISOI) in 1979, after the school was stormed during the uprising), where he graduated in 1976 and later travelled abroad to complete his higher education.

Shahnawaz was studying in Switzerland when Zia ul Haq's military regime executed his father in 1979. Prior to the execution, Shahnawaz and his elder brother Murtaza Bhutto had embarked on an international campaign to save their father's life, but it was to no avail. The two brothers continued to resist the military abrogation of the 1973 constitution in exile.

Shahnawaz and his brother Murtaza Bhutto married two Afghan sisters, Rehana and Fauzia. After the alleged involvement of Shahnawaz's wife Rehana in the murder of Shahnawaz, Murtaza Bhutto divorced his wife.

On 18 July 1985, the 26-year-old Shahnawaz was found dead in Nice, France. He died under mysterious circumstances, and the Bhutto family firmly believed he was poisoned. No one was brought to trial for murder, but Shahnawaz's wife Rehana was considered a suspect by the French authorities and remained in their custody for some time. She was found not guilty and later allowed to travel, and went to the United States. Pakistani media, which was under Zia's control, attributed death to drug and alcohol abuse.

Shahnawaz is believed to have helped organize a group dedicated to overthrowing the regime of President Mohammed Zia ul-Haq, through links to Al-Zulfiqar increasingly active in Pakistan at that time. The funeral of Shahnawaz turned into a defiant show of opposition to Zia's military rule. It was held in a Larkana sports stadium, attended by an estimated 25,000 people. He is buried at the Bhutto family mausoleum in Garhi Khuda Baksh in Sindh. Shahnawaz's daughter Sassi Bhutto lives with her mother in the United States.
