= Murtaza Bhutto =

Pakistani politician and militant (1954–1996)

- مُرتضٰی بُھٹّو
- Born: 18 September 1954; Karachi, Dominion of Pakistan
- Died: 20 September 1996 (aged 42); Karachi, Sindh, Pakistan
- Cause of death: Police encounter
- Resting place: Bhutto family mausoleum
- Education: Harvard University (BA); University of Oxford (MA)
- Occupation: Politician
- Political party: PPP–Shaheed Bhutto
- Spouses: Fauzia Bhutto (divorced); Ghinwa Bhutto
- Children: 2 (Fatima and Zulfikar)
- Parent(s): Zulfikar Ali Bhutto; Nusrat Ispahani
- Relatives: See Bhutto family
- Allegiance: Al-Zulfiqar
- Motive: Overthrow of Zia regime
- Convictions: 1981 by military tribunal
- Criminal charges: Airplane hijacking, terrorism
- Penalty: Death

Murtaza Bhutto (Note: Sindhi: مير غلام مرتضيٰ ڀٽو; Urdu: مُرتضٰی بُھٹّو) (18 September 1954 – 20 September 1996) was a Pakistani politician and leftist activist who led Al-Zulfiqar, a left-wing militant organization, against Zia-ul-Haq's military regime. He was a member of the Bhutto family as the son of Zulfikar Ali Bhutto, and earned a bachelor's degree from Harvard University and a master's degree from the University of Oxford. Murtaza founded al-Zulfiqar after his father was overthrown and executed in 1979 by the military regime of General Zia-ul-Haq. In 1981, he claimed responsibility for the assassination of conservative politician Chaudhry Zahoor Elahi, and the hijacking of a Pakistan International Airlines airplane from Karachi, during which a hostage was killed. In exile in Afghanistan, Murtaza was sentenced to death in absentia by a military tribunal.

He returned to Pakistan in 1993 and was arrested for terrorism on the orders of his sister, then-Prime Minister Benazir Bhutto. Released on bail, Murtaza successfully contested elections to the Sindh Provincial Assembly, becoming a vocal critic of Benazir and her husband Asif Ali Zardari. After increasing tensions between the two, he was shot dead along with six associates in a police encounter near his home in Karachi on 20 September 1996. Benazir's government was dismissed a month later by President Farooq Leghari, primarily citing Murtaza's death and corruption. Zardari was arrested and indicted for Murtaza's murder, but acquitted in 2008. Murtaza's own faction of his father's Pakistan People's Party–Shaheed Bhutto, remains active in politics.

== Early life and education ==
Born into the Bhutto family in Karachi on 18 September 1954, to Zulfiqar Ali Bhutto and Nusrat Bhutto, he received his early education at St. Mary's Academy. He was born in a Sindhi Rajput Bhutto family, and has three siblings: Benazir, Shahnawaz and Sanam. He later passed his 'O' levels from the Karachi Grammar School in 1971. In 1972, Murtaza went off to Harvard University where he took his bachelor's degree. For a period of time, he was the roommate of Texas gubernatorial candidate and former mayor of Houston, Bill White. In 1976, Bhutto graduated with his thesis entitled "Modicum of Harmony". His thesis dealt with the spread of nuclear weapons in general, and the implications of India's nuclear weapons on Pakistan in particular. Murtaza went on to attend Christ Church Oxford, his father's alma mater, for a three-year Master of Letters (MLitt) degree course. Bhutto submitted his master thesis, containing a vast argumentative work on Nuclear strategic studies, where he advocated for Pakistan's right to develop its nuclear deterrence programme to counter Indian nuclear programme.

== Leadership of Al-Zulfiqar ==
The Al-Zulfiqar Organization (AZO) was born at this point, and disgruntled elements among the younger members of the PPP, disappointed in the party's leadership, flocked to Murtaza's side. The AZO, however, went on to earn the title of terrorist organisation due to its various terrorist activities throughout the country, a label which dogged Murtaza till he died. For his part, Murtaza always denied the charge that he espoused the politics of terrorism.

=== 1981 PIA hijacking ===
Al-Zulfiqar hijacked a Pakistan International Airlines flight after and diverted it to Kabul in March 1981. From Kabul the journey went on to Damascus, Syria. The hijacking went on for thirteen days, during which Murtaza shot Major Tariq Rahim for being an Army officer. Rahim was executed following Murtaza's conferring with Afghan Intelligence (KHAD) chief Mohammad Najibullah. The Zia government had to accept the demands of the hijackers, releasing dozens of prisoners languishing in Pakistani jails and flying them to Tripoli.

According to Vasili Mitrokhin, before the hijacking event Bhutto visited Kabul and met Najibullah on three occasions, together agreeing to fight the Pakistani regime through a plane hijacking in late 1980. Then during the hijacking when the plane was on the Kabul tarmac, Najibullah secretly met Bhutto in disguise at the plane. The KGB offered advice to Najibullah on exploiting the situation politically against Pakistan. Bhutto requested additional Al-Zulfiqar members to join them and Najibullah provided them with money, explosives, and weapons.

== Rift with Benazir and Zardari ==
He was not happy with the ways of Benazir's husband Asif Ali Zardari and wanted him removed from influence in the PPP. When Benazir decided to side with her husband, Murtaza became a strong critic of the PPP government and the ongoing corruption. It is widely believed in Pakistan that this incident drove Zardari to rage and he used police machinery to assassinate Murtaza Bhutto. Benazir became highly unpopular after this incident and her limo was stoned by PPP workers when she tried to visit Murtaza's funeral ceremonies. After Benazir's government was dismissed in 1996, Zardari was detained for having a part in Murtaza's assassination. However, no charges were ever proven due to lack of evidence.

== Personal life ==
Bhutto fell in love with an Afghan girl named Fauzia Fasihuddin in Afghanistan. He married Fauzia in 1980, and his brother Shahnawaz married her sister Rehana Fasihuddin. They had a daughter, Fatima Bhutto. The marriage ended in divorce, and Bhutto along with his daughter moved to Syria, where he married the Lebanese ballet instructor Ghinwa Bhutto in 1989. Bhutto, with his wife Ghinwa and daughter Fatima, later moved to Karachi in 1990, where the couple's son Zulfikar Ali Bhutto Jr was born.

== Police trial ==
During the 13 years that the trial for his murder dragged on, a number of judges were appointed to hear the murder case. The change of judges is one of the many reasons behind the delay in disposal of the present case. Other reasons include a lack of interest of the prosecution witnesses and long adjournments sought by the counsel for President Asif Ali. The acquitted included Mazhar Memon, Asghar Ali, Asif Ali Jatoi, Mehmood Bhallai, Ghulam Mustafa Chandio and Akhter Ali Mirani. The police personnel acquitted include Shoaib Suddle, Wajid Durrani, Masood Sharif, Rai Tahir and others who were prosecution witnesses in this case.

== See also ==
- Pakistan Peoples Party
- Pakistan Peoples Party (Shaheed Bhutto)
