= Bhutto (clan) =

Sindhi clan of Pakistan

ڀُٽو

Regions with significant populations
- Pakistan

Languages
- Sindhi language

Religion
- Islam

Related ethnic groups
- Sindhi

Bhutto (Sindhi: ڀُٽو) is a Sindhi Rajput clan in Sindh, Pakistan. The Bhuttos along with Bhattis and other subclans are said to be linked to the Bhati Rajputs. The politically influential Bhutto family of Pakistan hails from this clan.
