= January 2007 in sports =

<<	January 2007					>>
Su	Mo	Tu	We	Th	Fr	Sa
	1	2	3	4	5	6
7	8	9	10	11	12	13
14	15	16	17	18	19	20
21	22	23	24	25	26	27
28	29	30	31
Canada; Sports

January 2007 in sports provides an overview of all events related to sports in the month of January 2007.

== Deaths ==
- 1 – Darrent Williams
- 7 – Bobby Hamilton
- 9 – Ken Cranston
- 16 – Benny Parsons
- 26 – Gump Worsley
- 27 – Bing Devine
- 29 – Barbaro

== Sporting seasons ==
- Auto racing 2007:
  - A1 Grand Prix
- Basketball 2006–07:
  - Australian National Basketball League
  - Euroleague
  - National Basketball Association
  - NCAA Men's Basketball
  - Philippine Basketball Association
  - ULEB Cup
- Cricket 2006–07:
  - Australia
  - South Africa
- Cyclo-cross: 2006/07 Cyclo-cross World Cup
- Football (soccer) 2006–07:
  - 2006–07 UEFA Champions League
  - 2006–07 UEFA Cup
  - England (general)
    - FA Premier League 2006–07
  - Scotland (general)
    - Scottish Premier League 2006–07
- Golf:
  - 2007 PGA Tour
  - 2007 European Tour
- Ice hockey 2006–07:
  - National Hockey League
- Rugby union 2007:
  - 2006–07 Heineken Cup
  - 2006–07 English Premiership
  - 2006–07 Top 14
  - 2006–07 Celtic League
  - 2007 Rugby World Cup qualifying
  - 2006–07 IRB Sevens
- Speed skating 2006–07:
  - Essent Cup 2006–07
  - World Cup
- Volleyball 2007:
  - Men's CEV Champions League 2006–07
  - Women's CEV Champions League 2006–07

== 31 January 2007 (Wednesday) ==
- Cricket:
  - West Indies in India, fourth ODI in Vadodara:
    - India 341 (50 overs; Sachin Tendulkar 100*, Rahul Dravid 78, Sourav Ganguly 68) beat West Indies 181 (41.4 overs; Marlon Samuels 55) by 160 runs. India win the series 3:1.
  - 2007 ICC World Cricket League Division One in Nairobi, Kenya:
    - Kenya 133/3 (32.1 overs) beat Netherlands 131 (46.2 overs) by 7 wickets (with 107 balls remaining).
    - Scotland 276/4 (50 overs; Fraser Watts 70, Gavin Hamilton 64*, Dougie Brown 50*) beat Canada 269/9 (50 overs; Ashish Bagai 137*, Ashif Mulla 48) by 7 runs.
    - Ireland 276/6 (48.4 overs; William Porterfield 112*, Kevin O'Brien 54) beat Bermuda 275/8 (50 overs; Clay Smith 52, Dean Minors 51) by 4 wickets (with 8 balls remaining).
- Football (soccer):
  - 2007 ASEAN Football Championship, final, first leg:
    - Singapore 2 Thailand 1.
  - FC Bayern Munich sack their coach Felix Magath, replacing him with Magath's predecessor Ottmar Hitzfeld after a string of poor performances in their defence of their Bundesliga title.
- Basketball:
  - Euroleague, Group C
    - CSKA Moscow (Russia) , already assured of topping the group, win their 11th straight group match, manhandling Fenerbahçe Ülker (Turkey) 85–66 and ending Fener's very faint hopes of advancing to the Top 16. (Euroleague)
    - Benetton Treviso (Italy) , already qualified for the Top 16, come from behind to defeat Eldo Napoli (Italy) 64–62 away. The result leaves Eldo's hopes of the Top 16 hanging by a thread. (Euroleague)
    - Pau-Orthez (France) punch their ticket to the Top 16 with a 68–56 win over Žalgiris (Lithuania) . (Euroleague)
    - Although Aris TT Bank (Greece) lose 82–75 at home in overtime to Winterthur FCB (Spain) , they back into the Top 16 courtesy of Benetton's win over Eldo. (Euroleague)
  - US men's college basketball:
    - (1) Florida 74, (24) Vanderbilt 64
    - Indiana 71, (2) Wisconsin 66
    - (3) North Carolina 105, Miami (FL) 64
    - (4) Ohio State 78, Purdue 60
    - (10) Texas A&M 73, Iowa State 49
    - NC State 70, (16) Virginia Tech 59
    - Gonzaga 90, (23) Stanford 86 (2 OT)

== 30 January 2007 (Tuesday) ==
- Cricket:
  - 2006–07 Commonwealth Bank Series in Perth:
    - New Zealand 318/7 (Lou Vincent 76, Ross Taylor 71, Jacob Oram 54*) beat England 260/8 (Ed Joyce 66, Paul Nixon 49) by 58 runs. New Zealand qualify to the final.
  - 2007 ICC World Cricket League Division One in Nairobi, Kenya:
    - Netherlands 201/2 (35 overs; Bas Zuiderent 77 not out) beat Canada 200 (44 overs; Ashish Bagai 74) by 8 wickets (with 90 balls remaining)
    - Scotland 284/7 (50 overs; Neil McCallum 100) beat Ireland 280/7 (50 overs; Jeremy Bray 116) by 3 wickets (with 0 balls remaining)
- Football (soccer):
  - 18th Arabian Gulf Cup in United Arab Emirates:
    - Final: United Arab Emirates 1 Oman 0.
- Team handball – Men's World Championship in Germany:
  - Quarter finals:
    - Germany 27 Spain 25.
    - France 21 Croatia 18.
    - Poland 28 Russia 27.
    - Denmark 42 Iceland 41 (OT).
  - Placement matches:
    - 9th/10th Place: Hungary 34 Slovenia 33.
    - 11th/12th Place: Tunisia 25 Czech Republic 21.

== 29 January 2007 (Monday) ==
- Cricket:
  - 2007 ICC World Cricket League Division One in Nairobi, Kenya:
    - Kenya 137 for 0 (18.1 overs; David Obuya 74*, Morris Ouma 56*) beat Bermuda 133 (39.3 overs; Dean Minors 52) by ten wickets.
- Horse racing:
  - The 2006 Kentucky Derby winner Barbaro is euthanized due to complications from the broken leg he suffered in that year's Preakness.
- Men's US college basketball:
  - (8) Kansas 76, Nebraska 56
  - (9) Pittsburgh 65, Villanova 59

== 28 January 2007 (Sunday) ==
- Tennis – 2007 Australian Open:
  - Men's singles – Final:
    - Roger Federer (Switzerland) [1] def Fernando González (Chile) [10] 7–6(2) 6–4 6–4.
      Federer becomes the first man to win a Grand Slam event without losing a set since Björn Borg accomplished the feat in the 1980 French Open.
  - Mixed doubles – Final:
    - Daniel Nestor (Canada) /Elena Likhovtseva (Russia) def Max Mirnyi (Belarus) /Victoria Azarenka (Belarus) 6–4 6–4
- Cricket:
  - Pakistan in South Africa, third Test in Cape Town, day 3:
    - Pakistan 157 & 186, South Africa 183 & 161/5 (64 overs; Ashwell Prince 59 not out, Jacques Kallis 51). South Africa win by 5 wickets and win the series 2–1. Kallis is named both player of the match and player of the series.
  - 2006–07 Commonwealth Bank Series in Perth:
    - Australia 343/5 (Matthew Hayden 117, Ricky Ponting 111) beat New Zealand 335/5 (Jacob Oram 101*, Lou Vincent 66) by 8 runs.
- Football (soccer):
  - 2007 ASEAN Football Championship, semifinal, second leg:
    - Thailand 0 Vietnam 0. Thailand win 2–0 on aggregate.
- Team handball – Men's World Championship in Germany:
  (Bold teams qualify to quarter finals)
  - Group M I:
    - Germany 33 Iceland 28.
    - Poland 38 Slovenia 27.
    - France 28 Tunisia 26.
  - Group M II:
    - Croatia 29 Spain 28.
    - Russia 26 Hungary 25.
    - Denmark 33 Czech Republic 29.
  - Placement Matches:
    - 13th/14th place: Norway 32 Ukraine 22.
    - 15th/16th place: (South Korea) Korea 38 Argentina 31.
    - 17th/18th place: Egypt 26 Kuwait 22.
    - 19th/20th Place: Brazil 36 Morocco 29.
    - 21st/22nd place: Angola 29 Greenland 28.
    - 23rd/24th place: Qatar 36 Australia 22.
- Golf:
  - Tiger Woods wins his 7th consecutive PGA Tour event at the Buick Invitational in San Diego, California. This is the longest PGA Tour winning streak since Byron Nelson won 11 consecutive events in 1945.
- US college basketball:
  - Men's
    - (2) Wisconsin 57, Iowa 46
    - Stanford 75, (3) UCLA 68
    - (10) Duke 75, Boston College 61
    - Virginia 64, (19) Clemson 63
    - Georgia 57, (21) LSU 54
  - Women's
    - (2) North Carolina 84, (3) Maryland 71.
- Cyclo-cross – UCI Cyclo-cross World Championships:
  - Men: (gold) (Belgium) Erwin Vervecken, (silver) (United States) Jonathan Page, (bronze) (Italy) Enrico Franzoi
  - Women: (gold) (France) Maryline Salvetat, (silver) (United States) Katie Compton, (bronze) (France) Laurence Leboucher

== 27 January 2007 (Saturday) ==
- Tennis – 2007 Australian Open:
  - Women's singles – Final:
    - Serena Williams (United States) def Maria Sharapova (Russia) [1] 6–1 6–2
  - Men's doubles – Final:
    - Bob Bryan (United States) / Mike Bryan (United States) [1] def Jonas Björkman (Sweden) / Max Mirnyi (Belarus) [2] 7–5 7–5
  - Boys' singles – Final:
    - Brydan Klein (Australia) def Jonathan Eysseric (France) [2] 6–2 4–6 6–1
  - Girls' singles – Final:
    - Anastasia Pavlyuchenkova (Russia) [1] def Madison Brengle (United States) [16] 7–6(6) 7–6(3)
- Cricket:
  - Pakistan in South Africa, third Test in Cape Town, day 2:
    - Pakistan 157 & 186 all out (51.2 overs; Yasir Hameed 35), South Africa 183 all out (53.0 overs; Graeme Smith 64) & 36/2 (Graeme Smith 33 not out). South Africa trail by 124 runs with 8 wickets remaining in the 2nd innings.
  - West Indies in India, 3rd ODI in Chennai:
    - West Indies 270 for 7 (43.4 overs; Marlon Samuels 98, Brian Lara 83) beat India 268 (48 overs; Robin Uthappa 70, Sachin Tendulkar 66, Rahul Dravid 57) by 3 wickets. India lead the series 2:1.
- Football (soccer):
  - 2007 ASEAN Football Championship, semifinal, second leg:
    - Singapore 1 Malaysia 1 (AET) 5–4 (PSO).
  - 18th Arabian Gulf Cup in United Arab Emirates, semifinals:
    - Oman 1 Bahrain 0.
    - United Arab Emirates 1 Saudi Arabia 0.
- Figure skating – European Championships in Warsaw, Poland:
  - Carolina Kostner (Italy) wins the gold in the ladies' event, silver goes to Sarah Meier (Switzerland) and bronze to Kiira Korpi (Finland) . For the first time in 25 years, Russian skaters failed to win any of the titles.
- Team handball – Men's World Championship in Germany:
  (Bold teams qualify to quarter finals)
  - Group M I:
    - Germany 29 France 26.
    - Iceland 32 Slovenia 31.
    - Poland 40 Tunisia 31.
  - Group M II:
    - Croatia 31 Czech Republic 29.
    - Spain 33 Hungary 31.
    - Denmark 26 Russia 24.
  - Presidents Cup:
    - Ukraine 23 Argentina 22.
    - Norway 34 (South Korea) Korea 32.
    - Brazil 30 Australia 23.
    - Morocco 32 Angola 28.
- Rugby union:
  - For the fourth time in four Top 14 fixtures at Stade de France, Stade Français sets an all-time attendance record for a regular-season match in French sport, drawing 79,741 to see Stade defeat Toulouse 22–20. (Le Monde, in French)
- Men's US college basketball
  - (1) Florida 91, Auburn 66
  - (3) UCLA 62, California 46
  - (4) North Carolina 92, (17) Arizona 64. The Tar Heels hand Arizona its worst home loss ever under Lute Olson.
  - (5) Ohio State 66, Michigan State 64
  - (6) Texas A&M 70, Oklahoma 61
  - (7) Oregon 77, (20) Washington State 74 (OT)
  - (8) Kansas 97, Colorado 74
  - (9) Pittsburgh 72, St. Joihn's 46
  - Arkansas 63, (12) Alabama 57
  - BYU 61, (16) Air Force 52
- Athletics:
  - (Ethiopia) Tirunesh Dibaba set a world indoor record of 14 minutes, 27.42 seconds to win the women's 5,000 meters at the Boston Indoor Games.
- Cyclo-cross – UCI Cyclo-cross World Championships:
  - Juniors: (gold) (Belgium) Joeri Adams, (silver) (United States) Danny Summerhill, (bronze) (Czech Republic) Jiří Polnický
  - Under 23s: (gold) (Netherlands) Lars Boom, (silver) (Belgium) Niels Albert, (bronze) (France) Romain Villa

== 26 January 2007 (Friday) ==
- Tennis – 2007 Australian Open:
  - Men's singles – semi final:
    - Fernando González (Chile) [10] def Tommy Haas (Germany) [12] 6–1 6–3 6–1
  - Women's doubles – final:
    - Cara Black (Zimbabwe) /Liezel Huber (South Africa) [3] def Yung-Jan Chan (Chinese Taipei) /Chia-Jung Chuang (Chinese Taipei) 6–4 6–7(4) 6–1
- Cricket:
  - Pakistan in South Africa, third Test in Cape Town, day 1:
    - Pakistan 157 all out (43.1 overs; Mohammad Yousuf 83), South Africa 131/5 (39.0 overs; Graeme Smith 64). South Africa trail by 26 runs with 5 wickets remaining in the 1st innings.
  - 2006–07 Commonwealth Bank Series in Adelaide:
    - England 110 (34.3 overs); Australia 111/1 (24.3 overs). Australia win by 9 wickets (with 153 balls remaining).
- Football (soccer): Michel Platini, 51, is elected President of UEFA, defeating 77-year-old incumbent Lennart Johansson who was seeking a fifth term of office. Platini is seeking to limit countries to a maximum of three entries in the UEFA Champions League. (Playfuls.com)
- Figure skating – European Championships in Warsaw, Poland:
  - Isabelle Delobel and Olivier Schoenfelder (France) win the gold medal in ice dance, beating Oksana Domnina and Maxim Shabalin (Russia) by just 0.31 pts. World champions Albena Denkova and Maxim Staviski (Bulgaria) get the bronze.

== 25 January 2007 (Thursday) ==
- Tennis – 2007 Australian Open:
  - Men's singles – semi final:
    - Roger Federer (Switzerland) [1] def Andy Roddick (United States) [6] 6–4 6–0 6–2
  - Women's singles – semi finals:
    - Maria Sharapova (Russia) [1] def Kim Clijsters (Belgium) [4] 6–4 6–2
    - Serena Williams (United States) def Nicole Vaidišová (Czech Republic) [10] 7–6(5) 6–4
- Team handball – Men's World Championship in Germany:
  - Group M I:
    - Germany 35 Tunisia 28.
    - Poland 35 Iceland 33.
    - France 33 Slovenia 19.
  - Group M II:
    - Russia 30 Czech Republic 26.
    - Croatia 25 Hungary 18.
    - Denmark 27 Spain 23.
  - Presidents Cup:
    - Argentina 28 Kuwait 25.
    - (South Korea) Korea 36 Egypt 30.
    - Brazil 33 Greenland 30.
    - Morocco 44 Qatar 27.
- Figure skating – European Championships in Warsaw, Poland:
  - Brian Joubert (France) wins the gold in the men's event, Tomáš Verner (Czech Republic) the silver, and Kevin van der Perren (Belgium) the bronze.
- Basketball:
  - Euroleague
    - Eldo Napoli (Italy) keep their hopes of a spot in the Top 16 alive with a 93–88 overtime win over Fenerbahçe Ülker (Turkey) , a result that all but eliminates the losers from Top 16 contention. (Euroleague)
    - Dynamo Moscow (Russia) defeat fellow Top 16 qualifier Olympiacos (Greece) 84–69, securing top spot in Group A for TAU Cerámica (Spain) . (Euroleague)
  - Men's US college basketball
    - (3) UCLA 62, California 46
    - Washington 89, (7) Oregon 77
    - (10) Duke 68, (19) Clemson 66
    - Stanford 65, (25) USC 50

== 24 January 2007 (Wednesday) ==
- Tennis – 2007 Australian Open:
  - Men's singles – quarter finals:
    - Fernando González (Chile) [10] def Rafael Nadal (Spain) [2] 6–2 6–4 6–3
    - Tommy Haas (Germany) [12] def Nikolay Davydenko (Russia) [3] 6–3 2–6 1–6 6–1 7–5
  - Women's singles – quarter finals:
    - Maria Sharapova (Russia) [1] def Anna Chakvetadze (Russia) [12] 7–6(5) 7–5
    - Kim Clijsters (Belgium) [4] def Martina Hingis (Switzerland) [6] 3–6 6–4 6–3
- Cricket:
  - West Indies in India, second ODI in Cuttack:
    - India 189 (48.2 overs; Dinesh Karthik 63) beat West Indies 169 (48.2 overs; Shivnarine Chanderpaul 67) by 20 runs. India lead the 4-match series 2:0.
  - ICC Tri-series in Mombasa, Kenya:
    - Canada 213/9 (50 overs; Abdool Samad 50) beat Kenya 144 (35.1 overs; Ravi Shah 48) by 69 runs.
- Football (soccer):
  - 2007 ASEAN Football Championship, semifinal, first leg:
    - Vietnam 0 Thailand 2.
  - 18th Arabian Gulf Cup in United Arab Emirates:
    - Bahrain 2 Qatar 1.
    - Saudi Arabia 1 Iraq 0. Saudi Arabia and Bahrain qualify to the semifinals.
- Team handball – Men's World Championship in Germany:
  - Group M I:
    - Germany 35 Slovenia 29.
    - Iceland 36 Tunisia 30.
    - France 31 Poland 22.
  - Group M II:
    - Hungary 28 Czech Republic 25.
    - Spain 33 Russia 29.
    - Croatia 28 Denmark 26.
  - Presidents Cup:
    - Ukraine 33 Kuwait 23.
    - Norway 27 Egypt 18.
    - Greenland 34 Australia 25.
    - Angola 33 Qatar 27.
- Basketball:
  - Euroleague
    - Benetton Treviso (Italy) punches its ticket to the Top 16 phase, thrashing Pau-Orthez (France) 87–66 at home. (Euroleague)
  - Men's US college basketball
    - (1) Florida 70, Mississippi State 67
    - (2) Wisconsin 71, Michigan 58
    - (4) North Carolina 88, Wake Forest 60
    - (5) Ohio State 59, Northwestern 50
    - Texas Tech 70, (6) Texas A&M 68
    - (8) Kansas 82, Baylor 56
    - (9) Pittsburgh 67, Cincinnati 51
    - Vanderbilt 64, (21) LSU 53
- Ice hockey:
  - The Western Conference beat the Eastern Conference 12–9 in the 2007 NHL All-Star Game in Dallas, Texas.
- Figure skating – European Championships in Warsaw, Poland:
  - Aljona Savchenko and Robin Szolkowy (Germany) win the gold medal in the pairs event, breaking the sequence of 11 straight wins for Russia. Maria Petrova and Alexei Tikhonov win the silver medal, their 6th medal in a row, and Dorota Siudek and Mariusz Siudek (Poland) delight the home crowd with their bronze.

== 23 January 2007 (Tuesday) ==
- Tennis – 2007 Australian Open:
  - Men's singles – quarter finals:
    - Roger Federer (Switzerland) [1] def Tommy Robredo (Spain) [7] 6–3 7–6(2) 7–5
    - Andy Roddick (United States) [6] def Mardy Fish (United States) 6–2 6–2 6–2
  - Women's singles – quarter finals:
    - Nicole Vaidišová (Czech Republic) [10] def Lucie Šafářová (Czech Republic) 6–1 6–4
    - Serena Williams (United States) def Shahar Pe'er (Israel) [16] 3–6 6–2 8–6
- Cricket:
  - 2006–07 Commonwealth Bank Series in Adelaide:
    - New Zealand 210 (50 overs; Jacob Oram 86), England 120 (37.5 overs). New Zealand win by 90 runs.
  - ICC Tri-series in Mombasa, Kenya:
    - Canada 208 (44.3 overs), Scotland 209/8 (47.2 overs). Scotland win by 2 wickets (with 16 balls remaining).
- Football (soccer):
  - 2007 ASEAN Football Championship, semifinal, first leg:
    - Malaysia 1 Singapore 1.
  - Caribbean Nations Cup 2007 in Trinidad and Tobago:
    - 3rd place play off: Cuba 2 Guadeloupe 1.
    - Final: Haiti 2 Trinidad and Tobago 1.
  - 18th Arabian Gulf Cup in United Arab Emirates:
    - Oman 2 Yemen 1.
    - United Arab Emirates 3 Kuwait 2. Oman and UAE qualify to semifinals.
- Men's US college basketball:
  - Auburn 81, (12) Alabama 57
  - St. John's 71, (22) Notre Dame 68
  - Illinois 51, (23) Indiana 43

== 22 January 2007 (Monday) ==
- Tennis – 2007 Australian Open:
  - Men's singles – fourth round:
    - Rafael Nadal (Spain) [2] def Andy Murray (United Kingdom) [15] 6–7(3) 6–4 4–6 6–3 6–1
    - Nikolay Davydenko (Russia) [3] def Tomáš Berdych (Czech Republic) [13] 5–7 6–4 6–1 7–6(5)
    - Fernando González (Chile) [10] def James Blake (United States) [5] 7–5 6–4 7–6(4)
    - Tommy Haas (Germany) [12] def David Nalbandian (Argentina) [8] 4–6 6–3 6–2 6–3
  - Women's singles – fourth round:
    - Maria Sharapova (Russia) [1] def Vera Zvonareva (Russia) [22] 7–5 6–4
    - Kim Clijsters (Belgium) [4] def Daniela Hantuchová (Slovakia) [15] 6–1 7–5
    - Martina Hingis (Switzerland) [6] def Li Na (China) [19] 4–6 6–3 6–0
    - Anna Chakvetadze (Russia) [12] def Patty Schnyder (Switzerland) [8] 6–4 6–1
- American football: NFL
  - Bill Parcells announces his retirement as head coach of the Dallas Cowboys after three seasons.
  - The Oakland Raiders name former Southern California offensive coordinator Lane Kiffin, at age 31, their new head coach, making him the youngest head coach in NFL history.
- Cricket:
  - Pakistan in South Africa, second Test in Port Elizabeth, day 4:
    - South Africa 124 & 331, Pakistan 265 & 191/5 (57.3 overs; Younis Khan 67 not out, Kamran Akmal 57 not out). Pakistan win by 5 wickets and levels the series to 1:1. Player of the match: Inzamam-ul-Haq, Pakistan.
- Team handball:
  - 2007 World Men's Handball Championship in Germany:
    (bold teams qualified to the main round)
    - Kuwait 39 Greenland 27.
    - Slovenia 34 Tunisia 27.
    - Ukraine 37 Australia 18.
    - Iceland 32 France 24.
    - Poland 27 Germany 25.
    - Argentina 22 Brazil 20.
    - Egypt 35 Qatar 24.
    - Spain 35 Czech Republic 29.
    - Hungary 34 Angola 31.
    - Denmark 27 Norway 25.
    - South Korea 32 Morocco 19.
    - Croatia 32 Russia 27.
- U.S. thoroughbred horse racing: 2006 Eclipse Awards
  - Invasor is named Outstanding Older Male and Horse of the Year.
  - Bernardini wins 3-year-old colt honors.
  - Edgar Prado, who rode Barbaro to a win in the Kentucky Derby, is named Outstanding Jockey.
  - Todd Pletcher, whose stable set a North American record for prize money won in a year, wins his third straight Outstanding Trainer award.
- Women's US college basketball:
  - (1) Duke 74, (4) Tennessee 70

== 21 January 2007 (Sunday) ==
- Tennis – 2007 Australian Open:
  - Men's singles – third round:
    - Tommy Haas (Germany) [12] def Florian Mayer (Germany) 7–6(3) 6–3 6–3
    - Tomáš Berdych (Czech Republic) [13] def Dmitry Tursunov (Russia) [21] 6–2 6–1 6–1
  - Men's singles – fourth round:
    - Roger Federer (Switzerland) [1] def Novak Djokovic (Serbia) [14] 6–2 7–5 6–3
    - Andy Roddick (United States) [6] def Mario Ančić (Croatia) [9] 6–3 3–6 6–1 5–7 6–4
    - Tommy Robredo (Spain) [7] def Richard Gasquet (France) [18] 6–4 6–2 3–6 6–4
    - Mardy Fish (United States) def David Ferrer (Spain) [16] 6–1 7–6(4) 2–6 7–5
  - Women's singles – third round:
    - Li Na (China) [19] def Dinara Safina (Russia) [9] 6–2 6–2
    - Anna Chakvetadze (Russia) [12] def Jelena Kostanić Tošić (Croatia) 6–4 6–4
    - Daniela Hantuchová (Slovakia) [15] def Ashley Harkleroad (United States) 6–7(6) 7–5 6–4
  - Women's singles – fourth round:
    - Lucie Šafářová (Czech Republic) def Amélie Mauresmo (France) [2] 6–4 6–3
    - Shahar Pe'er (Israel) [16] def Svetlana Kuznetsova (Russia) [3] 6–4 6–2
    - Nicole Vaidišová (Czech Republic) [10] def Elena Dementieva (Russia) [7] 6–3 6–3
    - Serena Williams (United States) def Jelena Janković (Serbia) [11] 6–3 6–2
- American football:
  - NFL Conference championships:
    - NFC: Chicago Bears 39, New Orleans Saints 14. The Bears take advantage of early Saints fumbles and powerful running from Thomas Jones to take a 16–0 lead in the second quarter. New Orleans pulls within two points in the third when Reggie Bush turns a short slant pattern into an 88-yard score. But Bernard Berrian makes a terrific catch for a touchdown to make the score 25–14, then the Bears take advantage of two more Saints turnovers to pull away in the final period. Chicago advances to its first Super Bowl in 21 years. Also notable is that Bears head coach Lovie Smith becomes the first African American head coach to take his team to the Super Bowl.
    - AFC: Indianapolis Colts 38, New England Patriots 34. After years of playoff disappointments, Peyton Manning throws for 349 yards to lead the Colts to their first Super Bowl appearance since moving to Indianapolis in 1984. The Patriots pull out to a 21–3 lead in the second quarter when Asante Samuel returns a Manning interception for a touchdown. But Manning scores on a 1-yard run, then throws a 1-yard pass to Dan Kłecko and hits a two-point conversion to tie the game. The teams exchange another touchdown and field goal before Joseph Addai runs in from 3 yards out to put on the Colts on top for the first time. Marlin Jackson picks off a Tom Brady pass to seal the victory. Colts head coach Tony Dungy joins Smith as the first pair of African American head coaches in Super Bowl history.
  - In off-the-field news, the Pittsburgh Steelers named former Minnesota Vikings defensive coordinator Mike Tomlin as their new head coach.
- Cricket:
  - Pakistan in South Africa, second Test in Port Elizabeth, day 3:
    - South Africa 124 & 331 (133.2 overs; Jacques Kallis 91), Pakistan 265 & 8/0 (6 overs). Pakistan need 183 runs to win.
  - 2006–07 Commonwealth Bank Series in Sydney:
    - New Zealand 218 all out (47.4 overs), Australia 224/8 (48.4 overs). Australia win by 2 wickets with 8 balls remaining.
  - West Indies in India, first ODI in Nagpur:
    - India 338/3 (50 overs; Sourav Ganguly 98), West Indies 324/8 (50 overs; Shivnarine Chanderpaul 149 not out). India win by 14 runs.
  - ICC Tri-series in Mombasa, Kenya:
    - Kenya 259/9 (50 overs; Ravi Shah 113), Scotland 253/8 (50 overs). Kenya win by 6 runs.
- Football (soccer):
  - 18th Arabian Gulf Cup in United Arab Emirates:
    - Bahrain 1 Iraq 1.
    - Saudi Arabia 1 Qatar 1.
  - To commemorate the 80th anniversary of the first BBC Radio football commentary (Arsenal–Sheffield United, 21 January 1927), BBC Radio 5 Live Sports Extra commentates the Arsenal–Manchester United FA Premier League match in 1927 style, complete with the pitch divided into eight numbered squares. Meanwhile, BBC Radio 5 Live commentates the same match in 2007 style. Arsenal won 2–1 through a Thierry Henry header in stoppage time, United remain 6 points in the lead in the Championship race. (BBC)
- Team handball:
  - 2007 World Men's Handball Championship in Germany:
    (bold teams qualified to the main round)
    - Tunisia 36 Greenland 20.
    - Slovenia 33 Kuwait 23.
    - France 47 Australia 10.
    - Ukraine 32 Iceland 29.
    - Poland 31 Brazil 23.
    - Germany 32 Argentina 20.
    - Spain 41 Qatar 18.
    - Czech Republic 31 Egypt 30.
    - Denmark 39 Angola 20.
    - Hungary 25 Norway 22.
    - Russia 35 Morocco 19.
    - Croatia 41 South Korea 23.
- Field hockey:
  - 2007 Women's Champions Trophy in Quilmes, Argentina:
    - 5th place: Japan 2 Spain 0.
    - 3rd place: Germany 2 Australia 0.
    - Final: Netherlands 1 Argentina 0.
- Rugby union – Heineken Cup:
  - Llanelli Scarlets (Wales) , already assured of a home quarterfinal, become only the fifth team in the history of the competition to win all their matches in pool play, defeating London Irish (England) 20–16 at home.
  - The Scarlets are joined in this exclusive club about two hours later by Biarritz (France) , who defeat Northampton Saints (England) 17–8 away to win Pool 6. Both clubs were already assured of quarterfinal berths.
- Men's US college basketball:
  - (24) Marquette 77, (6) Pittsburgh 74 (OT)
  - (20) Notre Dame 82, South Florida 58

== 20 January 2007 (Saturday) ==
- Tennis – 2007 Australian Open:
  - Men's singles – third round:
    - Rafael Nadal (Spain) [2] def Stanislas Wawrinka (Switzerland) [31] 6–2 6–2 6–2
    - Nikolay Davydenko (Russia) [3] def Fabrice Santoro (France) 7–6(1) 6–2 6–2
    - James Blake (United States) [5] def Robby Ginepri (United States) 7–6(7) 7–5 6–2
    - David Nalbandian (Argentina) [8] def Sébastien Grosjean (France) [28] 5–7 4–6 7–6(4) 6–4 6–1
    - Fernando González (Chile) [10] def Lleyton Hewitt (Australia) [19] 6–2 6–2 5–7 6–4
    - Andy Murray (United Kingdom) [15] def Juan Ignacio Chela (Argentina) 6–3 6–2 6–4
  - Women's singles – third round:
    - Maria Sharapova (Russia) [1] def Tathiana Garbin (Italy) [30] 6–3 6–1
    - Kim Clijsters (Belgium) [4] def Alona Bondarenko (Ukraine) [29] 6–3 6–3
    - Martina Hingis (Switzerland) [6] def Aiko Nakamura (Japan) 6–2 6–1
    - Patty Schnyder (Switzerland) [8] def Alicia Molik (Australia) 3–6 6–2 6–0
    - Vera Zvonareva (Russia) [22] def Ana Ivanovic (Serbia) [13] 6–1 6–2
- Cricket:
  - Pakistan in South Africa, second Test in Port Elizabeth, day 2:
    - South Africa 124 & 115/3 (52.0 overs; Jacques Kallis 50 not out), Pakistan 265 (Inzamam-ul-Haq 92 not out). South Africa trail by 26 runs with 7 wickets remaining. Makhaya Ntini becomes the 22nd bowler, and third South African, to reach 300 Test wickets.
  - ICC Tri-series in Mombasa, Kenya:
    - Kenya win by walkover without a ball being bowled, after Canada forfeited the match due to player illness.
- Football (soccer):
  - 18th Arabian Gulf Cup in United Arab Emirates:
    - Oman 2 Kuwait 1. Oman qualify to the semifinals.
    - United Arab Emirates 2 Yemen 1.
  - Caribbean Nations Cup 2007 in Trinidad and Tobago, semifinals:
    - Trinidad and Tobago 3 Cuba 1.
    - Haiti 3 Guadeloupe 1.
- Team handball:
  - 2007 World Men's Handball Championship in Germany:
    - Slovenia 35 Greenland 21.
    - Tunisia 34 Kuwait 23.
    - Iceland 45 Australia 20.
    - France 32 Ukraine 21.
    - Poland 29 Argentina 15.
    - Czech Republic 37 Qatar 23.
    - Spain 33 Egypt 29.
    - Norway 41 Angola 13.
    - Hungary 30 Denmark 29.
    - Croatia 35 Morocco 22.
    - Russia 32 South Korea 32.
- Field hockey:
  - 2007 Women's Champions Trophy in Quilmes, Argentina:
    - Netherlands 1 Germany 1.
    - Japan 1 Spain 0.
    - Argentina 3 Australia 0. Argentina qualify to the final against Netherlands.
- Rugby union – Heineken Cup:
  - In a showdown for first place in Pool 1, London Wasps (England) secure a home quarterfinal with a 16–13 away win over Castres (France) .
  - In Pool 3, Stade Français (France) crush Calvisano (Italy) 47–6 at home to win the pool.
  - Also in Pool 3, Ospreys (Wales) defeat Sale Sharks (England) 18–7 away. However, Ospreys' failure to earn a bonus point left their hopes of a quarterfinal berth hanging by a thread, and also assured Northampton Saints (England) a quarterfinal berth.
  - Leicester Tigers (England) win Pool 4 and a home quarterfinal by defeating Munster (Ireland) 13–6. This result eliminates Ospreys from further contention, as Munster now takes one of the two quarterfinal berths for second-place teams in pool play. The Tigers become the first visiting team ever to win at Munster's Thomond Park in Heineken Cup play.
- Men's college basketball:
  - (1) Florida 79, Ole Miss 70
  - (2) Wisconsin 71, Illinois 64
  - (3) UCLA 73, (11) Arizona 69
  - (4) North Carolina 77, Georgia Tech 61
  - Texas Tech 69, (5) Kansas 64
  - (7) Ohio State 82, Iowa 63
  - (8) Texas A&M 67, (12) Oklahoma 49
  - (9) Oregon 92, California 84
  - (10) Alabama 78, Georgia 76
  - New Mexico State 80, (15) Nevada 73
  - Arkansas 72, (16) LSU 52
  - Villanova 76, (21) Texas 69
  - Vanderbilt 72, (25) Kentucky 67

== 19 January 2007 (Friday) ==
- Tennis – 2007 Australian Open:
  - Men's singles – third round:
    - Roger Federer (Switzerland) [1] def Mikhail Youzhny (Russia) [25] 6–3 6–3 7–6(5)
    - Andy Roddick (United States) [6] def Marat Safin (Russia) [26] 7–6(2) 2–6 6–4 7–6(2)
    - Tommy Robredo (Spain) [7] def Sam Querrey (United States) 6–4 6–7(5) 6–2 6–1
    - Mario Ančić (Croatia) [9] def Dominik Hrbatý (Slovakia) [22] 6–3 6–2 6–1
    - Novak Djokovic (Serbia) [14] def Danai Udomchoke (Thailand) 6–3 6–4 5–7 6–1
    - David Ferrer (Spain) [16] def Radek Štěpánek (Czech Republic) [20] 6–7(5) 4–6 6–0 6–4 6–3
    - Richard Gasquet (France) [18] def Gaël Monfils (France) 6–0 4–6 7–5 6–3
    - Mardy Fish (United States) def Wayne Arthurs (Australia) 3–0 ret.
  - Women's singles – third round:
    - Amélie Mauresmo (France) [2] def Eva Birnerová (Czech Republic) 6–3 6–1
    - Svetlana Kuznetsova (Russia) [3] def Maria Kirilenko (Russia) [26] 6–1 6–4
    - Serena Williams (United States) def Nadia Petrova (Russia) [5] 1–6 7–5 6–3
    - Elena Dementieva (Russia) [7] def Maria Elena Camerin (Italy) 6–1 6–3
    - Nicole Vaidišová (Czech Republic) [10] def Katarina Srebotnik (Slovenia) [21] 6–4 6–4
    - Jelena Janković (Serbia) [11] def Victoria Azarenka (Belarus) 6–3 6–4
    - Shahar Pe'er (Israel) [16] def Tatiana Golovin (France) [20] 3–6 7–5 7–5
    - Lucie Šafářová (Czech Republic) def Anastasiya Yakimova (Belarus) 6–3 ret.
- Cricket:
  - Pakistan in South Africa, second Test in Port Elizabeth, day 1:
    - South Africa won the toss and chose to bat first.
      South Africa 124 all out (40 overs), Pakistan 135/6 (40.2 overs). Pakistan led by 11 runs with 4 wickets remaining in the 1st innings.
  - 2006–07 Commonwealth Bank Series in Brisbane:
    - England 155 (42 overs), Australia 156/6 (38.4 overs). Australia won by 4 Wickets.
- Team handball:
  - 2007 World Men's Handball Championship in Germany:
    - Germany 27 Brazil 22.
- National Football League:
  - The Miami Dolphins hire San Diego Chargers offensive coordinator Cam Cameron as their new head coach. (ESPN)
  - USC quarterbacks coach Steve Sarkisian turns down the head coaching vacancy with the Oakland Raiders. (ESPN)
- Major League Baseball:
  - Former Notre Dame wide receiver Jeff Samardzija, projected as a first-round pick in the 2007 NFL draft, abandons football in favor of a five-year, $10 million deal to pitch in the Chicago Cubs organization. (ESPN)
  - Two free agents agree to contracts with new teams. Trot Nixon leaves the Boston Red Sox and signs with the Cleveland Indians, and David Wells agrees to remain with the San Diego Padres, pending a physical and minor contract details. Both agree to one-year deals for $3 million, with Wells' deal giving him the chance at an extra $4 million in incentives. (ESPN, Nixon) (ESPN, Wells)
- Rugby union – Heineken Cup:
  - In Pool 2, Leinster (Ireland) lose away 19–13 to Gloucester (England) . Although the Irish side had already secured top spot in the pool and a quarterfinal place, the loss effectively cost them a home quarterfinal.
  - This result secures a home quarterfinal for Llanelli Scarlets (Wales) , already assured of first place in Pool 5.

== 18 January 2007 (Thursday) ==
- Tennis – 2007 Australian Open:
  - Men's singles – second round:
    - Rafael Nadal (Spain) [2] def Philipp Kohlschreiber (Germany) 7–5 6–3 4–6 6–2
    - Nikolay Davydenko (Russia) [3] def Gilles Müller (Luxembourg) 6–4 6–0 6–3
    - James Blake (United States) [5] def Alex Kuznetsov (United States) 6–4 6–1 6–2
    - David Nalbandian (Argentina) [8] def Nicolás Lapentti (Ecuador) 6–4 6–4 6–4
    - Fernando González (Chile) [10] def Juan Martín del Potro (Argentina) 7–6(7) 4–6 6–7(3) 6–4 4–0 ret.
    - Tommy Haas (Germany) [12] def Ilija Bozoljac (Serbia) 7–6(3) 6–1 6–3
    - Tomáš Berdych (Czech Republic) [13] def Robert Smeets (Australia) 6–3 6–2 6–4
    - Andy Murray (United Kingdom) [15] def Fernando Verdasco (Spain) 7–6(4) 7–5 6–4
    - Juan Ignacio Chela (Argentina) def Jarkko Nieminen (Finland) [17] 6–3 2–6 6–4 6–4
    - Lleyton Hewitt (Australia) [19] def Frank Dancevic (Canada) 6–4 6–4 3–6 6–4
    - Dmitry Tursunov (Russia) [21] def Max Mirnyi (Belarus) 6–2 6–3 7–6(4)
    - Sébastien Grosjean (France) [28] def Olivier Rochus (Belgium) 4–6 6–1 6–3 4–6 6–4
    - Stanislas Wawrinka (Switzerland) [31] def Paul Capdeville (Chile) 6–4 6–3 6–2
    - Fabrice Santoro (France) def Arnaud Clément (France) 6–2 6–4 6–4
    - Robby Ginepri (United States) def Mischa Zverev (Germany) 6–4 7–5 6–1
    - Florian Mayer (Germany) def Andreas Seppi (Italy) 5–7 7–5 6–2 6–2
  - Women's singles – second round:
    - Maria Sharapova (Russia) [1] def Anastassia Rodionova (Russia) 6–0 6–3
    - Kim Clijsters (Belgium) [4] def Akiko Morigami (Japan) 6–3 6–0
    - Martina Hingis (Switzerland) [6] def Alla Kudryavtseva (Russia) 6–2 6–2
    - Patty Schnyder (Switzerland) [8] def Peng Shuai (China) 7–5 6–3
    - Dinara Safina (Russia) [9] def Youlia Fedossova (France) 6–3 6–2
    - Anna Chakvetadze (Russia) [12] def Laura Granville (United States) 6–2 5–7 6–1
    - Ana Ivanovic (Serbia) [13] def Agnieszka Radwańska (Poland) 6–2 3–6 6–2
    - Daniela Hantuchová (Slovakia) [15] def Émilie Loit (France) 4–6 6–3 6–4
    - Ashley Harkleroad (United States) def Anna-Lena Grönefeld (Germany) [17] 6–2 6–2
    - Li Na (China) [19] def Lourdes Domínguez Lino (Spain) 6–0 6–2
    - Vera Zvonareva (Russia) [22] def Tamira Paszek (Austria) 6–1 6–3
    - Jelena Kostanić Tošić (Croatia) def Samantha Stosur (Australia) [24] 6–4 2–6 6–2
    - Alona Bondarenko (Ukraine) [29] def Virginie Razzano (France) 6–3 6–4
    - Tathiana Garbin (Italy) [30] def Renata Voráčová (Czech Republic) 6–1 7–5
    - Alicia Molik (Australia) def Kaia Kanepi (Estonia) 1–6 6–3 6–2
    - Aiko Nakamura (Japan) def Sania Mirza (India) 6–3 6–2
- Football (soccer):
  - 18th Arabian Gulf Cup in United Arab Emirates:
    - Saudi Arabia 2 Bahrain 1.
    - Iraq 1 Qatar 0.
  - Caribbean Nations Cup 2007 in Trinidad and Tobago:
    - Cuba 0 Guyana 0.
    - Guadeloupe 1 Saint Vincent and the Grenadines 0. Guadeloupe and Cuba qualify to SF and to 2007 CONCACAF Gold Cup.
- Field hockey:
  - 2007 Women's Champions Trophy in Quilmes, Argentina:
    - Germany 2 Spain 1.
    - Netherlands 1 Australia 0. Netherlands qualify to the final.
    - Argentina 3 Japan 1.
- Basketball:
  - Euroleague
    - Maccabi Tel Aviv (Israel) secure a place in the Top 16 with a 91–83 home win over Cibona (Croatia) . (Euroleague)
    - RheinEnergie Köln (Germany) are mathematically eliminated from Top 16 contention after losing 72–61 to Prokom Trefl Sopot (Poland) . (Euroleague)
    - Le Mans (France) are also mathematically eliminated from the Top 16 thanks to a 70–69 loss to Dynamo Moscow (Russia) , Le Mans' sixth straight in the Euroleague. (Euroleague)
  - Men's college basketball:
    - (3) UCLA 60, Arizona State 50
    - (9) Oregon 66, Stanford 59
    - Southern California 80, (11) Arizona 73
- Cricket:
  - ICC Tri-series in Mombasa, Kenya:
    - Canada 292/5 (50 overs), Scotland 293/8 (49.5 overs). Scotland win by 2 wickets with 1 ball remaining.

== 17 January 2007 (Wednesday) ==
- Tennis – 2007 Australian Open:
  - Men's singles – second round:
    - Roger Federer (Switzerland) [1] def Jonas Björkman (Sweden) 6–2 6–3 6–2
    - Andy Roddick (United States) [6] def Marc Gicquel (France) 6–3 7–6(4) 6–4
    - Tommy Robredo (Spain) [7] def Jürgen Melzer (Austria) 6–1 6–3 6–3
    - Mario Ančić (Croatia) [9] def Guillermo García López (Spain) 3–6 7–5 6–2 6–2
    - Gaël Monfils (France) def Marcos Baghdatis (Cyprus) [11] 7–6(5) 6–2 2–6 6–0
    - Novak Djokovic (Serbia) [14] def Feliciano López (Spain) 6–2 7–5 6–1
    - David Ferrer (Spain) [16] def Thomas Johansson (Sweden) 6–2 6–7(5) 6–2 6–2
    - Richard Gasquet (France) [18] def Amer Delić (United States) 6–1 6–2 6–4
    - Radek Štěpánek (Czech Republic) [20] def Lukáš Dlouhý (Czech Republic) 4–6 4–6 6–4 6–1 6–4
    - Dominik Hrbatý (Slovakia) [22] def Vincent Spadea (United States) 5–7 6–4 6–4 6–3
    - Danai Udomchoke (Thailand) def Juan Carlos Ferrero (Spain) [24] 7–6(0) 7–5 4–6 6–1
    - Mikhail Youzhny (Russia) [25] def Yen-Hsun Lu (Chinese Taipei) 7–5 6–4 6–4
    - Marat Safin (Russia) [26] def Dudi Sela (Israel) 6–3 5–7 4–6 7–6(4) 6–0
    - Mardy Fish (United States) def Nicolas Mahut (France) 7–5 6–4 3–6 6–4
    - Sam Querrey (United States) def Florent Serra (France) 6–3 6–4 6–3
    - Wayne Arthurs (Australia) def Zack Fleishman (United States) 6–7(5) 6–1 6–4 6–4
  - Women's singles – first round:
    - Patty Schnyder (Switzerland) [8] def Madison Brengle (United States) 6–3 6–4
    - Dinara Safina (Russia) [9] def Ekaterina Bychkova (Russia) 7–6(5) 6–1
    - Daniela Hantuchová (Slovakia) [15] def Alizé Cornet (France) 6–4 6–1
    - Anna-Lena Grönefeld (Germany) [17] def Sandra Záhlavová (Czech Republic) 6–4 6–1
    - Li Na (China) [19] def Elena Bovina (Russia) 6–4 6–3
    - Vera Zvonareva (Russia) [22] def Tzipora Obziler (Israel) 6–3 6–4
  - Women's singles – second round:
    - Amélie Mauresmo (France) [2] def Olga Puchkova (Russia) 6–2 6–2
    - Svetlana Kuznetsova (Russia) [3] def Monique Adamczak (Australia) 6–2 6–1
    - Nadia Petrova (Russia) [5] def Gisela Dulko (Argentina) 6–1 6–2
    - Elena Dementieva (Russia) [7] def Martina Müller (Germany) 7–5 3–6 6–0
    - Nicole Vaidišová (Czech Republic) [10] def Milagros Sequera (Venezuela) 6–2 6–1
    - Jelena Janković (Serbia) [11] def Virginia Ruano Pascual (Spain) 6–2 6–2
    - Lucie Šafářová (Czech Republic) def Francesca Schiavone (Italy) [14] 6–3 6–3
    - Shahar Pe'er (Israel) [16] def Meilen Tu (United States) 6–3 6–0
    - Victoria Azarenka (Belarus) def Marion Bartoli (France) [18] 6–0 7–5
    - Tatiana Golovin (France) [20] def Zuzana Ondrášková (Czech Republic) 6–2 6–0
    - Katarina Srebotnik (Slovenia) [21] def Iveta Benešová (Czech Republic) 7–6(0) 6–7(6) 6–1
    - Anastasiya Yakimova (Belarus) def Ai Sugiyama (Japan) [23] 6–2 2–6 10–8
    - Maria Kirilenko (Russia) [26] def Julia Vakulenko (Ukraine) 4–6 6–3 6–4
    - Maria Elena Camerin (Italy) def Elena Vesnina (Russia) 4–6 6–3 8–6
    - Serena Williams (United States) def Anne Kremer (Luxembourg) 7–6(4) 6–2
    - Eva Birnerová (Czech Republic) def Julia Schruff (Germany) 6–2 2–6 6–2
- Football (soccer):
  - 2007 ASEAN Football Championship, group B in Singapore:
    - Singapore 2 Indonesia 2.
    - Vietnam 9 Laos 0. Singapore and Vietnam qualify for semifinals.
  - 18th Arabian Gulf Cup in United Arab Emirates:
    - Oman 2 United Arab Emirates 1.
    - Kuwait 1 Yemen 1.
  - Caribbean Nations Cup 2007 in Trinidad and Tobago:
    - Martinique 3 Barbados 2.
    - Trinidad and Tobago 3 Haiti 1. Trinidad & Tobago and Haiti qualify to the SF and 2007 CONCACAF Gold Cup.
- Basketball:
  - Euroleague:
    - Unicaja Málaga (Spain) hand Panathinaikos (Greece) their first Euroleague loss of the season, 67–61. (Euroleague)
    - Efes Pilsen (Turkey) manhandle Olympiacos (Greece) on the road 91–72, putting the Istanbul side in the Top 16. (Euroleague)
  - Men's college basketball:
    - (2) Wisconsin 69, Purdue 64
    - (4) North Carolina 77, (19) Clemson 55
    - (7) Ohio State 73, Northwestern 41
    - Vanderbilt 94, (10) Alabama 73
    - Villanova 102, (20) Notre Dame 87
    - Auburn 83, (22) Tennessee 80
    - Florida State 82, (23) Virginia Tech 73
- Cricket:
  - ICC Tri-series in Mombasa, Kenya:
    - Kenya 328/5 (50 overs), Scotland 138 all out (38.2 overs). Kenya win by 190 runs.

== 16 January 2007 (Tuesday) ==
- Tennis – 2007 Australian Open:
  - Men's singles – first round:
    - Rafael Nadal (Spain) [2] def Robert Kendrick (United States) 7–6(6) 6–3 6–2
    - Nikolay Davydenko (Russia) [3] def Sergio Roitman (Argentina) 6–2 7–5 6–2
    - James Blake (United States) [5] def Carlos Moyá (Spain) 7–6(8) 6–2 6–4
    - David Nalbandian (Argentina) [8] def Janko Tipsarević (Serbia) 6–7(5) 4–6 7–6(2) 6–0 2–1 Ret.
    - Fernando González (Chile) [10] def Evgeny Korolev (Russia) 6–7(4) 7–6(6) 6–3 6–2
    - Tommy Haas (Germany) [12] def Álbert Montañés (Spain) 7–5 6–1 7–6(3)
    - Tomáš Berdych (Czech Republic) [13] def Hyung-Taik Lee (South Korea) 6–1 6–2 6–2
    - Andy Murray (United Kingdom) [15] def Alberto Martín (Spain) 6–0 6–0 6–1
    - Jarkko Nieminen (Finland) [17] def Paul Goldstein (United States) 5–7 6–2 7–6(4) 6–4
    - Lleyton Hewitt (Australia) [19] def Michael Russell (United States) 3–6 2–6 6–3 6–3 6–3
    - Dmitry Tursunov (Russia) [21] def Alexander Waske (Germany) 5–7 6–4 6–3 6–4
    - Florian Mayer (Germany) def Robin Söderling (Sweden) [23] 3–6 6–4 3–6 6–4 6–0
    - Sébastien Grosjean (France) [28] def Christophe Rochus (Belgium) 6–2 4–1 Ret.
    - Arnaud Clément (France) def Xavier Malisse (Belgium) [29] 6–3 3–6 7–5 6–4
    - Stanislas Wawrinka (Switzerland) [31] def Kevin Kim (United States) 6–1 2–6 6–4 6–2
    - Robby Ginepri (United States) def Nicolás Almagro (Spain) [32] 4–6 6–2 4–6 7–5 6–3
  - Women's singles – first round:
    - Maria Sharapova (Russia) [1] def Camille Pin (France) 6–3 4–6 9–7
    - Kim Clijsters (Belgium) [4] def Vasilisa Bardina (Russia) 6–0 6–0
    - Martina Hingis (Switzerland) [6] def Nathalie Dechy (France) 6–0 6–2
    - Anna Chakvetadze (Russia) [12] def Sybille Bammer (Austria) 6–4 7–5
    - Ana Ivanovic (Serbia) [13] def Vania King (United States) 6–2 6–0
    - Samantha Stosur (Australia) [24] def Klára Zakopalová (Czech Republic) 6–3 6–1
    - Kaia Kanepi (Estonia) def Flavia Pennetta (Italy) [28] 7–5 7–6(3)
    - Alona Bondarenko (Ukraine) [29] def Stéphanie Cohen-Aloro (France) 6–1 7–6(6)
    - Tathiana Garbin (Italy) [30] def Emmanuelle Gagliardi (Switzerland) 3–6 6–2 6–1
    - Aiko Nakamura (Japan) def Eleni Daniilidou (Greece) [32] 6–4 6–0
- Cricket:
  - 2006–07 Commonwealth Bank Series in Hobart:
    - New Zealand 205/9 (50 overs), England 206/7 (49.5 overs). England won by 3 wickets (with 1 ball remaining).
- American football:
  - Former Denver Broncos tight end coach Tim Brewster signs as the head coach of the Minnesota Golden Gophers football team.
- Auto racing:
  - NASCAR
    - Benny Parsons former NASCAR Winston Cup Champion dies of lung cancer at the age of 65.
- Football (soccer):
  - 2007 ASEAN Football Championship, group A in Bangkok:
    - Philippines 0 Myanmar 0.
    - Thailand 1 Malaysia 0. Thailand and Malaysia qualify to semifinals.
  - Caribbean Nations Cup 2007 in Trinidad and Tobago:
    - Guyana 4 Guadeloupe 3.
    - Cuba 3 Saint Vincent and the Grenadines 0.
- Field hockey:
  - 2007 Women's Champions Trophy in Quilmes, Argentina:
    - Spain 2 Australia 2.
    - Germany 1 Japan 0.
    - Netherlands 3 Argentina 0.
- Men's college basketball:
  - (6) Pittsburgh 63, UConn 54
  - (11) Oklahoma State 105, (21) Texas 103 (3 OT)
  - Utah 85, (13) Air Force 79

== 15 January 2007 (Monday) ==
- Tennis – 2007 Australian Open:
  - Men's singles – first round:
    - Roger Federer (Switzerland) [1] def Björn Phau (Germany) 7–5 6–0 6–4
    - Mardy Fish (United States) def Ivan Ljubičić (Croatia) [4] 4–6 7–6(2) 6–4 6–4
    - Andy Roddick (United States) [6] def Jo-Wilfried Tsonga (France) 6–7(18) 7–6(2) 6–3 6–3: The first-set tiebreak, which Tsonga won 20–18, was the longest in Australian Open history.
    - Tommy Robredo (Spain) [7] def Rubén Ramírez Hidalgo (Spain) 6–4 6–4 6–0
    - Mario Ančić (Croatia) [9] def Go Soeda (Japan) 6–4 6–3 6–2
    - Marcos Baghdatis (Cyprus) [11] def Rainer Schüttler (Germany) 6–4 2–6 6–3 6–2
    - Novak Djokovic (Serbia) [14] def Nicolás Massú (Chile) 6–1 6–1 6–0
    - David Ferrer (Spain) [16] def Kristian Pless (Denmark) 7–5 6–4 6–3
    - Richard Gasquet (France) [18] def Filippo Volandri (Italy) 6–4 6–4 6–2
    - Radek Štěpánek (Czech Republic) [20] def Michaël Llodra (France) 6–2 6–4 6–0
    - Dominik Hrbatý (Slovakia) [22] def Jiří Vaněk (Czech Republic) 6–7(7) 7–6(1) 6–1 6–3
    - Juan Carlos Ferrero (Spain) [24] def Jan Hájek (Czech Republic) 3–0 Ret.
    - Mikhail Youzhny (Russia) [25] def Jan Hernych (Czech Republic) 7–6(6) 6–2 6–0
    - Marat Safin (Russia) [26] def Benjamin Becker (Germany) 5–7 7–6(2) 3–6 6–3 6–4
    - Sam Querrey (United States) def José Acasuso (Argentina) [27] 6–7(2) 6–4 6–1 6–3
    - Zack Fleishman (United States) def Agustín Calleri (Argentina) [30] 7–5 4–6 6–3 6–4
  - Women's singles – first round:
    - Amélie Mauresmo (France) [2] def Shenay Perry (United States) 6–3 6–4
    - Svetlana Kuznetsova (Russia) [3] def Jessica Moore (Australia) 6–2 6–0
    - Nadia Petrova (Russia) [5] def Tamarine Tanasugarn (Thailand) 6–3 6–2
    - Elena Dementieva (Russia) [7] def Stéphanie Foretz (France) 6–1 6–2
    - Nicole Vaidišová (Czech Republic) [10] def Jill Craybas (United States) 6–4 5–7 6–1
    - Jelena Janković (Serbia) [11] def Aleksandra Wozniak (Canada) 6–3 6–3
    - Francesca Schiavone (Italy) [14] def Sandra Klösel (Germany) 6–4 6–4
    - Shahar Pe'er (Israel) [16] def Romina Oprandi (Italy) 6–1 6–3
    - Marion Bartoli (France) [18] def Vera Dushevina (Russia) 6–0 6–3
    - Tatiana Golovin (France) [20] def Anna Smashnova (Israel) 6–3 6–1
    - Katarina Srebotnik (Slovenia) [21] def Casey Dellacqua (Australia) 4–6 6–2 7–5
    - Ai Sugiyama (Japan) [23] def Sofia Arvidsson (Sweden) 6–3 6–4
    - Elena Vesnina (Russia) def Anabel Medina Garrigues (Spain) [25] 6–7(7) 6–1 6–1
    - Maria Kirilenko (Russia) [26] def Karolina Šprem (Croatia) 3–6 6–3 6–1
    - Serena Williams (United States) def Mara Santangelo (Italy) [27] 6–2 6–1
    - Julia Schruff (Germany) def Zheng Jie (China) [31] 4–6 7–6(1) 6–4
- Cricket:
  - Pakistan in South Africa, first Test in Centurion, day 5:
    Pakistan 313 & 302, South Africa 417 & 199/3 (60.5 overs). South Africa win by 7 wickets. Player of the match: Hashim Amla, South Africa.
- Football (soccer):
  - 2007 ASEAN Football Championship, group B in Singapore:
    - Indonesia 1 Vietnam 1.
    - Singapore 11 Laos 0. Noh Alam Shah scores 7 goals as Singapore nets 6 goals in the last 20 minutes.
  - Caribbean Nations Cup 2007 in Trinidad and Tobago:
    - Haiti 2 Barbados 0. Haiti qualify to semifinals.
    - Trinidad and Tobago 5 Martinique 1.
- College basketball:
  - Men's:
    - (6) Kansas 70, Missouri 67
  - Women's:
    - (2) North Carolina 82, (7) UConn 76

== 14 January 2007 (Sunday) ==
- American football: National Football League divisional playoffs:
  - NFC: Chicago Bears 27, Seattle Seahawks 24 (OT). Robbie Gould's 49-yard field goal 4:58 into overtime allows the Bears to host New Orleans next Sunday (21 January) in the NFC Championship Game.
  - AFC: New England Patriots 24, San Diego Chargers 21: Stephen Gostkowski kicks a 31-yard field goal with 1:10 left, then Nate Kaeding misses a 54-yarder that would have sent the game into overtime. The Chargers commit five turnovers, which lead to 14 New England points. The Patriots will play the Indianapolis Colts next week for the AFC championship.
- In off-the-field news, the Arizona Cardinals name former Pittsburgh Steelers offensive coordinator Ken Whisenhunt as their new head coach.
- Cricket:
  - Pakistan in South Africa, first Test in Centurion, day 4:
    Pakistan 313 & 302 all out, South Africa 417 & 69/2. South Africa need 130 more runs to win with 8 wickets remaining.
  - 2006–07 Commonwealth Bank Series in Hobart:
    - Australia 289/8 (50 overs), New Zealand 184 all out (38.3 overs). Australia win by 105 runs.
- Darts: 2007 BDO World Darts Championship:
  - Martin Adams (England) wins one version of the World Professional Darts Championship at his fourteenth attempt. Having won the first six sets, he lost the next six sets but prevailed 7–6 against fellow 50-year-old Phill Nixon (England) in Surrey (England) .
- Football (soccer):
  - 2007 ASEAN Football Championship, group A in Bangkok:
    - Malaysia 0 Myanmar 0.
    - Thailand 4 Philippines 0
  - Caribbean Nations Cup 2007 in Trinidad and Tobago:
    - Guadeloupe 2 Cuba 1.
    - Saint Vincent and the Grenadines 2 Guyana 0.
- Field hockey:
  - 2007 Women's Champions Trophy in Quilmes, Argentina:
    - Netherlands 3 Japan 0.
    - Australia 2 Germany 1.
    - Argentina 4 Spain 1.
- Rugby union – Heineken Cup:
  - Munster (Ireland) become the latest club to secure a quarterfinal berth with a 30–27 win over Bourgoin (France) .
- Men's college basketball:
  - (15) Oregon 79, (10) Arizona 77

== 13 January 2007 (Saturday) ==
- American football:
  - National Football League divisional playoffs:
    - AFC: Indianapolis Colts 15, Baltimore Ravens, 6. Adam Vinatieri's post-season record tying five field goals puts the Colts into the AFC Championship Game in their ancestral home. The Colts' defense had another solid game, forcing four turnovers and holding the Ravens to 87 rushing yards. Ray Lewis has 15 total tackles for Baltimore.
    - NFC: New Orleans Saints 27, Philadelphia Eagles 24. The Saints, who put up 208 rushing yards, go on top on two second-half Deuce McAllister touchdowns. New Orleans wastes a chance to put the game away when Reggie Bush botches a pitch from Drew Brees, but a costly penalty forces the Eagles to punt with less than two minutes left. Three more McAllister runs clinch the victory and the first conference-championship appearance in Saints history.
- Tennis:
  - ATP Tour:
    - Medibank International in Sydney, Australia:
      Final: (3) James Blake (United States) beat Carlos Moyá (Spain) 6:3 5:7 6:1.
    - Heineken Open in Auckland, New Zealand:
      Final: (3) David Ferrer (Spain) beat (1) Tommy Robredo (Spain) 6:4 6:2.
  - AAMI Kooyong Classic in Melbourne, Australia:
    Final: (3) Andy Roddick (United States) beat (1) Roger Federer (Switzerland) 6:2 3:6 6:3.
- Cricket:
  - Pakistan in South Africa, first Test in Centurion, day 3:
    Pakistan 313 & 103/2 (33.0 overs), South Africa 417 all out (Ashwell Prince 138, Herschelle Gibbs 94). Pakistan trail by 1 run with 8 wickets remaining.
- Football (soccer):
  - 2007 ASEAN Football Championship, group B in Singapore:
    - Indonesia 3 Laos 1.
    - Singapore 0 Vietnam 0.
- Field hockey:
  - 2007 Women's Champions Trophy in Quilmes, Argentina:
    - Netherlands 3 Spain 1.
    - Australia 3 Japan 0.
    - Argentina 2 Germany 0.
- Rugby union – Heineken Cup:
  - Two more clubs book their places in the quarterfinals. Leinster (Ireland) secure their berth with a 49–10 demolition of Edinburgh (Scotland) , and Llanelli Scarlets (Wales) do the same with a 35–11 romp over Ulster (Ireland).
- College basketball:
  - Men's:
    - Virginia Tech 94, (1) North Carolina 88. Eight days after the Hokies stun Duke, they claim the scalp of the top-ranked Tar Heels at home.
    - (2) Florida 84, South Carolina 50
    - (3) Wisconsin 56, Northwestern 50
    - (4) UCLA 65, USC 64. Arron Afflalo scores the winning basket with 4 seconds left.
    - (5) Ohio State 68, (16) Tennessee 66
    - (6) Kansas 68, Iowa State 64 (OT)
    - (7) Pittsburgh 74, Georgetown 69
    - (8) Texas A&M 87, Colorado 69
    - (9) Oklahoma State at Nebraska, postponed (ice storm)
    - Maryland 92, (17) Clemson 87. The last unbeaten team in Division I men's basketball falls.
    - Marquette 81, (21) West Virginia 63
    - Stanford 71, (22) Washington State 68 (OT)
  - Women's:
    - (3) Duke 81, (1) Maryland 62. In a rematch of last season's national title game won by Maryland, the Blue Devils take revenge in front of the Cameron Crazies.

== 12 January 2007 (Friday) ==
- American football:
  - The New York Daily News reports in today's editions that the NFL plans to stage a regular season game during the 2007 regular season at New Wembley Stadium in London, England between the New York Giants and the Miami Dolphins.
- Tennis:
  - 2007 WTA Tour:
    - Medibank International in Sydney, Australia:
      Final: (3) Kim Clijsters (Belgium) beat Jelena Janković (Serbia) 4:6 7:6(1) 6:4.
    - Moorilla Hobart International in Hobart, Australia:
      Final: (1) Anna Chakvetadze (Russia) beat (Q) Vasilisa Bardina (Russia) 6:3 7:6(3).
- Cricket:
  - Pakistan in South Africa, first Test in Centurion, day 2:
    - Pakistan 313 all out, South Africa 254/4 (75.0 overs). South Africa trail by 59 runs with 6 wickets remaining in the 1st innings.
  - 2006–07 Commonwealth Bank Series in Melbourne:
    - England 242/8 (50 overs), Australia 243/2 (45.2 overs). Australia win by 8 wickets with 28 balls remaining.
- Football (soccer):
  - 2007 ASEAN Football Championship, group A in Bangkok, Thailand:
    - Malaysia 4 Philippines 0.
    - Thailand 1 Myanmar 1.
  - Caribbean Nations Cup 2007 in Trinidad and Tobago:
    - Trinidad and Tobago 1 Barbados 1.
    - Haiti 1 Martinique 0.
- Rugby union – Heineken Cup:
  - Biarritz (France) become the first club to secure a quarterfinal berth with a 45–3 thrashing of Parma (Italy) .
- Basketball: Philippine Basketball Association Philippine Cup Wildcard Playoffs: The Sta. Lucia Realtors def. the Air21 Express, 121–118 via overtime to advance to the quarterfinals.

== 11 January 2007 (Thursday) ==
- Football (Soccer)
  - Real Madrid announces that David Beckham will leave the team when his contract expires on 30 June, and has already signed a contract to play for the Los Angeles Galaxy of Major League Soccer in the United States beginning 1 July, with a five-year deal worth $50 million (US; £25.6 million UK) in direct salary with a potential total payoff of $250 million/£128 million. The deal is believed to be largest for one player in history.(MLSNET.com)(Sportal)
- Cricket:
  - Pakistan in South Africa, First Test in Centurion, day 1:
    Pakistan won the toss and elected to bat first.
    Pakistan 242/5 (84.0 overs)
- Basketball:
  - Euroleague:
    - Dynamo Moscow (Russia) defeat Prokom Trefl Sopot (Poland) 95–74. The win, combined with Olympiacos' (Greece) 80–76 home win over Le Mans (France) , assures Dynamo of a spot in the Top 16. (Euroleague)
    - DKV Joventut (Spain) also punch their ticket to the Top 16 with a 98–92 win over Maccabi Tel Aviv (Israel) . (Euroleague)
    - Panathinaikos (Greece) become the first club to secure top spot in their group with a 79–69 away win over Lottomatica Roma (Italy) . (Euroleague)
    - Žalgiris (Lithuania) lose at home 83–70 to Fenerbahçe Ülker (Turkey) , becoming the first club to be mathematically eliminated from advancement to the Top 16. (Euroleague)
  - Men's college basketball:
    - (10) Arizona 83, Oregon State 72

== 10 January 2007 (Wednesday) ==
- College basketball:
  - Men's
    - (1) North Carolina 79, Virginia 69
    - (6) Kansas 87, (9) Oklahoma State 57
    - (7) Pittsburgh 59, DePaul 49
    - Georgia Tech 74, (11) Duke 63. The Yellow Jackets send Duke to an 0–2 start in the ACC.
    - UIC 73, (12) Butler 67 (OT)
    - Vanderbilt 82, (16) Tennessee 81
    - Marquette 73, (24) UConn 69
  - Women's
    - (8) Oklahoma 76, (9) Baylor 63

== 9 January 2007 (Tuesday) ==
- Baseball:
  - Cal Ripken Jr. and Tony Gwynn are elected to the Baseball Hall of Fame by the Baseball Writers' Association of America (ESPN) (AP).
- Football (soccer):
  - 2006–07 Carling Cup quarter-final:
    For the first time in 77 years, Liverpool concedes six goals at home in an astonishing 3–6 defeat by Arsenal, which will play archrival Tottenham Hotspur in the semifinal. (BBC)
- Cricket:
  - England in Australia, Twenty20 International in Sydney:
    Australia 221 for 5 (Gilchrist 48, Ponting 47, White 40*) beat England 144 for 9 (Dalrymple 32) by 77 runs. Australia crushes England after piling up the largest total at international level.
  - Rain ruins the deciding ODI between New Zealand and Sri Lanka as the match is abandoned without a ball being bowled. The two sides were tied 2–2 after the first four games of the five match series.
- Men's college basketball:
  - (3) Wisconsin 72, (5) Ohio State 69

== 8 January 2007 (Monday) ==
- American football: NCAA Bowl Championship Series
  - BCS Championship Game: (2) Florida 41, (1) Ohio State 14. The Gators shock the previously undefeated Buckeyes to win the national championship. Florida holds the Buckeyes to 82 yards of total offense; Ohio State's quarterback, Heisman Trophy winner Troy Smith, goes 4-for-14. Half of Ohio State's points come on Ted Ginn Jr.'s return of the opening kickoff for a touchdown, but Ginn injures his ankles in the celebration that follows and does not return.
  - Boise State, the only undefeated team in Division I college football in 2006–07, wins one first-place vote in the year-end Associated Press poll, robbing the Gators of unanimity, and also becoming the second team in 3 seasons that was undefeated but not champion. Ohio State finishes number two despite the championship debacle.
- Basketball:
  - The WNBA holds its dispersal draft from the roster of the defunct Charlotte Sting. The Chicago Sky make Monique Currie the top pick.
- Freestyle skiing:
  - The International Ski Federation and the local organizing committee at Madonna di Campiglio agree to postpone the Freestyle Skiing World Championships. The event was originally scheduled for 22–27 January but will be now held on 5–11 March.

== 7 January 2007 (Sunday) ==
- American football:
  - NFL Wild Card Games:
    - AFC: New England Patriots 37, New York Jets 16. Asante Samuel's return of a Chad Pennington interception for a touchdown seals the win for the Patriots, who will play the San Diego Chargers in the next round.
    - NFC: Philadelphia Eagles 23, New York Giants 20. A 38-yard field goal by David Akers as time expires sends the Eagles to New Orleans for a divisional playoff against the Saints. Tiki Barber rushes for 137 yards in his apparent final game.
  - NFL Coaching Changes:
    - The Atlanta Falcons announce the hiring of Louisville head coach Bobby Petrino as their new head coach, giving him a five-year, $24-million contract.
  - College football:
    - GMAC Bowl at Mobile, Alabama: Southern Miss 28, Ohio 7.
- Tennis:
  - ATP Tour – Next Generation Adelaide International in Adelaide, Australia:
    - Final: (1) (Serbia) Novak Djokovic beat (WC) (Australia) Chris Guccione 6:3 6:7(6) 6:4.
  - ATP Tour – Chennai Open in Chennai, India:
    - Final: (3) (Belgium) Xavier Malisse beat (Austria) Stefan Koubek 6:1 6:3.
- Ski Jumping:
  - (Norway) Anders Jacobsen wins the most prestigious title in ski jumping, the Four Hills Tournament, after finishing second behind teenager (Austria) Gregor Schlierenzauer in Bischofshofen.
- Cross-country skiing:
  - (Germany) Tobias Angerer and (Finland) Virpi Kuitunen win the inaugural Tour de Ski with commanding performances in the concluding pursuits at Val di Fiemme in Italy.
- Golf:
  - PGA Tour: (Fiji) Vijay Singh wins his 30th PGA Tour title at the first event of the year, the Mercedes-Benz Championship in Kapalua, Hawaii. It is also his 18th PGA Tour win after turning 40, breaking Sam Snead's record. (ESPN)
- Alpine Skiing:
  - Four-time Olympic champion (Norway) Kjetil André Aamodt announces his retirement. Aamodt won 20 Olympic and world championship medals, the most of any male skier.
- Athletics:
  - Bahrain revokes the citizenship of Kenyan-born Mushir Salem Jawher after he took part in a marathon in Israel without permission. Jawher, whose original name is Leonard Mucheru Maina, won the Tiberias Marathon on 4 January.

== 6 January 2007 (Saturday) ==
- American football:
  - NFL Wild Card Games:
    - AFC: Indianapolis Colts 23, Kansas City Chiefs 8. The much-ridiculed Colts defense holds the Chiefs to 126 yards. Indianapolis is to play at Baltimore next week.
    - NFC: Seattle Seahawks 21, Dallas Cowboys 20. The Cowboys have a chance to take the lead with a short field goal with 1:14 left, but holder Tony Romo mishandles the snap. Seattle will play the Chicago Bears in the next round.
  - NFL non-playoff news:
    - Sean Payton of the New Orleans Saints is named NFL Coach of the Year. (ESPN)
  - College football:
    - International Bowl at Rogers Centre in Toronto:
      Cincinnati 27, Western Michigan 24
    - Greg Schiano of Rutgers is honored with the Eddie Robinson Coach of the Year Award by the Football Writers Association of America.
- Tennis:
  - ATP Tour – Qatar ExxonMobil Open in Doha, Qatar:
    - Final: (2) Ivan Ljubičić (Croatia) beat (4) Andy Murray (United Kingdom) 6:4 6:4.
  - WTA Tour – Mondial Australian Women's Hardcourts in Gold Coast, Australia:
    - Final: (2) Dinara Safina (Russia) beat (1) Martina Hingis (Switzerland) 6:3 3:6 7:5.
  - WTA Tour – ASB Classic in Auckland, New Zealand:
    - Final: (1) Jelena Janković (Serbia) beat (5) Vera Zvonareva (Russia) 7:6(9) 5:7 6:3.
- Cricket:
  - India in South Africa:
    - Third and Final Test in Cape Town, day 5:
      India 414 & 169, South Africa 373 & 211/5 (64.1 overs). South Africa win by 5 wickets and win the Test series 2:1.
  - Sri Lanka in New Zealand:
    - Fourth One Day International in Auckland:
      Sri Lanka 262–6 (50 overs), New Zealand 73–10 (26.3 overs). Sri Lanka win by 189 runs and levels the 5-match series 2:2.
- College basketball:
  - Men's:
    - (17) Oregon 68, (1) UCLA 66. Two days after the Ducks suffer their first loss to Southern California, they return the favor to the top-ranked Bruins at home. (ESPN)
    - Virginia Tech 69, (5) Duke 67 (OT)
    - Washington State 77, (7) Arizona 73 (OT). The Cougars pounce in the Palouse, winning over Arizona for the first time since 1986.
    - Arkansas 88, (8) Alabama 61
    - (19) LSU 66, (14) UConn 49
    - In NCAA Division III, Caltech defeats Bard 81–52, snapping a 60-game losing streak against all competition and a 207-game losing streak against NCAA opposition dating to 1996. (ESPN)
  - Women's:
    - (4) Tennessee 70, (5) UConn 64. The Lady Vols win the latest round in arguably the biggest rivalry in women's basketball.

== 5 January 2007 (Friday) ==
- American football:
  - Bill Cowher resigns as head coach of the Pittsburgh Steelers after 15 seasons. (ESPN)
  - The San Diego Chargers' LaDainian Tomlinson, already named as NFL MVP, is named NFL Offensive Player of the Year. (ESPN)
  - Jason Taylor of the Miami Dolphins is named NFL Defensive Player of the Year. (ESPN)
- Cricket:
  - England in Australia:
    - 2006–07 Ashes series, Fifth Test in Sydney, day 4:
      England 291 & 147 all out (58.0 overs), Australia 393 & 46 for 0 (10.5 overs). Australia win by 10 wickets and completes the first Ashes 5–0 whitewash since the tour of 1920/21.
  - India in South Africa:
    - Third and Final Test in Cape Town, day 4:
      India 414 & 169 all out (64 overs), South Africa 373 & 55–2 (16.2 overs). South Africa need 156 runs with 8 wickets remaining to win the match and series.
- Tennis – 2007 Hopman Cup in Perth, Australia:
  - Final: Russia (Nadia Petrova and Dmitri Tursunov) beat Spain (Anabel Medina Garrigues and Tommy Robredo) 2:1.
- Ice hockey – 2007 World Junior Ice Hockey Championships at Ejendals Arena in Leksand, Sweden:
  - Final: Canada beat Russia 4:2.
  - Bronze medal match: USA (United States) beat Sweden 2:1.

== 4 January 2007 (Thursday) ==
- American football:
  - The Oakland Raiders fire head coach Art Shell. (AP via Yahoo)
  - LaDainian Tomlinson wins the Associated Press' National Football League Most Valuable Player Award. (AP via Yahoo)
- Cricket:
  - England in Australia:
    - 2006–07 Ashes series, Fifth Test in Sydney, day 3:
      England 291 & 114 for 5 (43.0 overs), Australia 393. England led by 12 runs with 5 wickets left in the second innings.
  - India in South Africa:
    - Third and Final Test in Cape Town, day 3:
      First innings: India 414, South Africa 373.
- Basketball – Euroleague:
  - Greek power Olympiacos (Greece) becomes the latest team to secure a place in the Top 16 phase with a 73–64 away win over Prokom Trefl Sopot (Poland) . (Euroleague)
- Ski Jumping – 2006–07 Four Hills Tournament:
  - (Norway) Anders Jacobsen wins the 3rd leg at Innsbruck, ahead of (Austria) Thomas Morgenstern and (Switzerland) Simon Ammann. Jacobsen also leaps to the top of the overall standing, 10.7 points ahead of (Finland) Arttu Lappi.
- Tennis:
  - Women's world Number 1 Justine Henin-Hardenne pulls out of the 2007 Australian Open, citing undisclosed family issues. (ESPN)

== 3 January 2007 (Wednesday) ==
- Cricket:
  - England in Australia:
    - 2006–07 Ashes series, Fifth Test in Sydney, day 2:
      First innings: England bowled out for 291 (103.4 overs), Australia 188 for 4 (55.0 overs).
  - India in South Africa:
    - Third and Final Test in Cape Town, day 2:
      First innings: India 414 all out, South Africa 114–1 in 41.0 overs.
- American college football:
  - Nick Saban, head coach of the Miami Dolphins of the NFL, agrees to become head coach at Alabama. Contract details are still pending, but the contract is believed to be the most lucrative ever for a college football coach. (ESPN)
  - BCS: Allstate Sugar Bowl, (8) LSU 41, (11) Notre Dame 14.
- Basketball:
  - Euroleague:
    - Two Spanish clubs punch their tickets to the Top 16 phase – TAU Cerámica (Spain) with a 97–68 home victory over RheinEnergie Köln (Germany) and Winterthur FCB (Spain) with an 84–67 home win over Žalgiris Kaunas (Lithuania) . (Euroleague – TAU), (Euroleague – Barça)
  - WNBA:
    - The Charlotte Sting, one of the league's eight original franchises, fold. The Charlotte Bobcats, who had owned the team since being awarded the NBA's newest franchise in 2004, gave up control of the team three weeks earlier, and the WNBA could not find a buyer. (ESPN)
    - Van Chancellor, who coached the Houston Comets since the league's inception in 1997 and coached the team to the first four WNBA championships, resigns. (ESPN)
- Ice hockey – 2007 World Junior Ice Hockey Championships:
  - Canada and Russia advance to the gold medal game, with victories over USA (United States) and Sweden respectively in the semifinals.

== 2 January 2007 (Tuesday) ==
- Cricket:
  - England in Australia:
    - 2006–07 Ashes series, Fifth Test in Sydney, day 1:
      Australia leads the series 4–0. England won the toss and decided to bat first.
      England first innings, at stumps: 234 for 4 (80.0 overs). Ian Bell paced England with 71 runs, including a 108-run partnership with Kevin Pietersen. Andrew Flintoff and Paul Collingwood stood on an unbeaten 67 at stumps. Glenn McGrath, in his final Test, bowled 2/57, taking the wickets of Bell and Pietersen in five balls. (BBC), (Cricinfo scorecard)
  - India in South Africa:
    - Third and Final Test in Cape Town, day 1:
      Series tied 1–1. India won the toss and chose to bat first.
      India 254–3 (90.0 overs). India's opening batsmen, Wasim Jaffer (116) and Dinesh Karthik (95), shared a first-wicket stand of 153.
  - Sri Lanka in New Zealand:
    - Third One Day International in Christchurch:
      Sri Lanka 112 in 35.2 overs (D/L target: 110 for 46), New Zealand 110–6 in 24.3 overs.
      New Zealand win by 4 wickets and lead the 5-match series 2–1.
- American college football:
  - Bowl Championship Series: FedEx Orange Bowl, (5) Louisville 24, (15) Wake Forest 13

== 1 January 2007 (Monday) ==
- American football:
  - College football – New Year's Day bowl games:
    - BCS Games:
      - Rose Bowl, (8) Southern California 32, (3) Michigan 18. Dwayne Jarrett (11 receptions, 204 yards, 2 TDs) and John David Booty (27–45, 390 yards, 4 TDs) shred the Wolverines secondary.
      - Fiesta Bowl, (9) Boise State 43, (7) Oklahoma 42 (OT). In a game that "will go down as one of best games in college football history", according to Arash Markazi, writer for SI.com, the Broncos send it into overtime with a hook-and-ladder play on 4th and 18, score a touchdown in overtime on a halfback pass, then run a Statue of Liberty play to score the winning two-point conversion.
    - Non-BCS Games:
      - Outback Bowl, Penn State 20, (17) Tennessee 10. Nittany Lions cornerback Tony Davis breaks a fourth-quarter tie with an 88-yard fumble return for a touchdown.
      - Capital One Bowl, (6) Wisconsin 17, (12) Arkansas 14. John Stocco throws two first-half touchdowns, and the Badgers defense holds on.
      - Gator Bowl, (13) West Virginia 38, Georgia Tech 35. Pat White throws for two third-quarter touchdowns and rushes for a third to erase an 18-point hole.
      - Cotton Bowl Classic, Auburn 17, Nebraska 14.
  - NFL News:
    - Denver Broncos cornerback Darrent Williams is killed in a drive-by shooting outside a Denver nightclub.
    - Two coaches are fired: Jim Mora of the Atlanta Falcons and Dennis Green of the Arizona Cardinals.
    - Domanick Davis, the franchise-leading rusher of the Houston Texans who sat out the 2006 NFL season with knee issues, changes his name to Domanick Williams, and is permitted to change his number from 37 to 31. Williams is his mother's maiden name, whereas Davis was the last name of his half-brother's father. 31 was the number he had in high school and college. (ESPN)
- College basketball: Texas Tech defeats New Mexico, 70–68 in coach Bob Knight's 880th career victory. Knight passes Dean Smith for first place all-time.
- Darts: 2007 PDC World Darts Championship:
  - Raymond van Barneveld battles from 3 sets to 0 down to win his first PDC title and fifth world title overall 7–6 in the sudden-death leg versus Phil Taylor who maintains his record of reaching every single PDC World Championship final to date.
- Ski jumping: 2006–07 Four Hills Tournament:
  - Andreas Küttel (Switzerland) wins the second competition in windy and rainy conditions in the traditional 1 January ski jumping meeting in Garmisch-Partenkirchen. Due to the wind and rain the second jump of the day was cancelled, which saw Küttel reducing the gap to leader Gregor Schlierenzauer (Austria) to three points.
- Tennis: 2007 ATP Tour:
  - In the Next Generation Adelaide International for the first time in history besides the Tennis Masters Cup a round-robin competition is in use to replace the normally used 32 player brackets. The new system will be used in several other tournaments throughout the season.

== See also ==
- Portal:Sports
