= Pakistan cricket team performance in 2010 =

This is a list of the Pakistan cricket team's performance in 2010. The year began poorly for the national team with the retirement of Zulqarnain Haider. 2010 was also notable as the year of the Pakistan cricket spot-fixing scandal that occurred during a Test match between England and Pakistan at Lord's, London, in August 2010.

== Team performance in 2010 in Tests ==
| Rank | Team | Matches | Won | Lost | Draw | % Won |
|---|---|---|---|---|---|---|
| 6 | Pakistan | 10 | 2 | 6 | 2 | 20.00 |

| vs | Matches | Won | Lost | Draw | % Won |
|---|---|---|---|---|---|
| Australia | 4 | 1 | 3 | 0 | 25.00 |
| England | 4 | 1 | 3 | 0 | 25.00 |
| South Africa | 2 | 0 | 0 | 2 | 0.00 |

== Team performance in 2010 in ODIs ==
| Rank | Team | Matches | Won | Lost | Tie | N/R | % Won |
|---|---|---|---|---|---|---|---|
| 6 | Pakistan | 18 | 5 | 13 | 0 | 0 | 27.78 |

| vs | Matches | Won | Lost | Tie | N/R | % Won |
|---|---|---|---|---|---|---|
| Australia | 5 | 0 | 5 | 0 | 0 | 0.00 |
| Bangladesh | 1 | 1 | 0 | 0 | 0 | 100.00 |
| England | 5 | 2 | 3 | 0 | 0 | 40.00 |
| India | 1 | 0 | 1 | 0 | 0 | 0.00 |
| South Africa | 5 | 2 | 3 | 0 | 0 | 40.00 |
| Sri Lanka | 1 | 0 | 1 | 0 | 0 | 0.00 |

== Team performance in 2010 T20s ==
| Rank | Team | Matches | Won | Lost | Tied | N/R | % Won |
|---|---|---|---|---|---|---|---|
| 1 | Pakistan | 18 | 6 | 12 | 0 | 0 | 33.33 |

| vs | Matches | Won | Lost | Tied | N/R | % Won |
|---|---|---|---|---|---|---|
| Australia | 5 | 2 | 3 | 0 | 0 | 40.00 |
| Bangladesh | 1 | 1 | 0 | 0 | 0 | 100.00 |
| England | 5 | 1 | 4 | 0 | 0 | 20.00 |
| New Zealand | 4 | 1 | 3 | 0 | 0 | 25.00 |
| South Africa | 3 | 1 | 2 | 0 | 0 | 33.33 |

== Pakistan overall performance in 2010 ==
| Rank | Team | Matches | Won | Lost | Tied | Draw/N/R | % Won |
|---|---|---|---|---|---|---|---|
| 6 | Pakistan | 46 | 13 | 31 | 0 | 2 | 28.26 |

== See also ==
- Pakistan cricket team performance in 2011
