= English cricket team in Australia in 2006–07 =

International cricket tour

	Australia	England
- Dates: 10 November 2006 – 11 February 2007
Captains	Ricky Ponting	Andrew Flintoff

Test series
- Result: Australia won the 5-match series 5–0
Most runs	Ricky Ponting (576)	Kevin Pietersen (490)
Most wickets	Stuart Clark (26)	Matthew Hoggard (13)
- Player of the series: Ricky Ponting

The England cricket team toured Australia from November 2006 to February 2007 for a five-match Test series that formed The Ashes, a triangular One Day International series with Australia and New Zealand, one Twenty20 International against Australia, and tour matches against Australian domestic sides and select XIs.

Australia regained the Ashes fifteen months after relinquishing them by winning the first three Test matches, sealing the series with a 206-run victory in the third Test at the WACA Ground. Australia went on to win the series 5-0, the first such Ashes whitewash since 1920-21. Australia were winners in a one-off Twenty20 International at Sydney Cricket Ground, the hosts prevailing by 77 runs. England were triumphant, however, in the Commonwealth Bank Series, beating Australia 2-0 in a best-of-three final.

== Squads ==
Tests		ODIs		
Australia	England	Australia	England	New Zealand
Ricky Ponting (c); Adam Gilchrist (vc) & (wk); Stuart Clark; Michael Clarke; Matthew Hayden; Michael Hussey; Mitchell Johnson; Justin Langer; Brett Lee; ~~Damien Martyn~~; Glenn McGrath; Andrew Symonds; Shaun Tait; Adam Voges; Shane Warne; Shane Watson	Andrew Flintoff (c); Andrew Strauss (vc); James Anderson; Ian Bell; Paul Collingwood; Alastair Cook; Jamie Dalrymple; ~~Ashley Giles~~; Steve Harmison; Matthew Hoggard; Geraint Jones (wk); Ed Joyce; Sajid Mahmood; Monty Panesar; Kevin Pietersen; Liam Plunkett; Chris Read (wk); ~~Marcus Trescothick~~	Ricky Ponting (c); Adam Gilchrist (vc) & (wk); Nathan Bracken; Stuart Clark; Michael Clarke; Matthew Hayden; Ben Hilfenhaus; Brad Hogg; Michael Hussey; Mitchell Johnson; Brett Lee; Glenn McGrath; Andrew Symonds; Shaun Tait; Shane Watson; Cameron White	Michael Vaughan (c); James Anderson; Ian Bell; Ravi Bopara; Stuart Broad; Paul Collingwood; Jamie Dalrymple; Andrew Flintoff; Ed Joyce; Jon Lewis; Mal Loye; Sajid Mahmood; Paul Nixon (wk); Monty Panesar; Kevin Pietersen; Liam Plunkett; Chris Read (wk); Andrew Strauss; Chris Tremlett	Stephen Fleming (c); Andre Adams; Nathan Astle; Shane Bond; James Franklin; Peter Fulton; Mark Gillespie; Hamish Marshall; Michael Mason; Brendon McCullum (wk); Craig McMillan; Jacob Oram; Jeetan Patel; Scott Styris; Ross Taylor; Daniel Vettori; Lou Vincent

On 14 November, Marcus Trescothick left the tour due to a “recurrence of a stress-related illness”, with Ed Joyce named as his replacement. On 16 December, Ashley Giles returned home for personal reasons; Jamie Dalrymple was called up in his place.

On 18 November, Michael Clarke was brought into the Australia squad as injury cover for Shane Watson. On 8 December, Damien Martyn announced his retirement from all forms of cricket with immediate effect. Andrew Symonds and Adam Voges were brought into the team as replacements.

== Tour matches ==
10 November 2006
Scorecard

Prime Minister's XI; 347/5 (50 overs)	v	England; 181 (38.4 overs)
PA Jaques 112 (110); AF Giles 1/53 [8]		AJ Strauss 67 (67); SW Tait 3/21 [8]

Prime Minister's XI won by 166 runs
Manuka Oval, Canberra
Umpires: WF Ruse and RJ Tucker
Player of the match: PA Jaques (Prime Minister's XI)

12–14 November 2006
Scorecard

New South Wales	v	England
9/355d (101.1 overs); PA Jaques 107 (157); SJ Harmison 3/95 [20]		349 (90.4 overs); KP Pietersen 122 (171); SR Clark 3/50 [17]
6/194 (51 overs); MJ Clarke 68 (105); JM Anderson 3/40 [10]

Match drawn
Sydney Cricket Ground, Sydney
Umpires: RD Goodger and DL Orchard

17–19 November 2006
Scorecard

South Australia	v	England
7/247d (81.1 overs); DS Lehmann 99 (143); MJ Hoggard 3/40 [13]		415 (124.1 overs); IR Bell 132 (240); SW Tait 3/87 [25.4]
2/164 (46 overs); DJ Harris 71* (126); KP Pietersen 1/24 [3]

Match drawn
Adelaide Oval, Adelaide
Umpires: AR Collins and SJ Davis

8 December 2006
Scorecard

England XI; 8/259 (50 overs)	v	Cricket Australia Chairman's XI; 3/260 (40.1 overs)
AJ Stewart 69 (69); CD Matthews 3/38 [7]		L Ronchi 89 (49); MS Panesar 2/63 [10]

Cricket Australia Chairman's XI won by 7 wickets
Lilac Hill, Perth
Umpires: PJ Loader and DG Weser
Player of the match: L Ronchi (Cricket Australia Chairman's XI)

9–10 December 2006
Scorecard

Western Australia	v	England
8/322d (97.3 overs); LA Pomersbach 101 (139); JM Anderson 3/53 [24.3]		5/356 (88 overs); AN Cook 106 (171); AK Heal 2/61 [20]

Match drawn
WACA Ground, Perth
Umpires: B Bennett and JK Brookes

== Twenty20 International ==
9 January 2007
Scorecard

Australia; 5/221 (20 overs)	v	England; 9/144 (20 overs)
AC Gilchrist 48 (29); MS Panesar 2/40 [4]		JWM Dalrymple 32 (27); BW Hilfenhaus 2/16 [4]

Australia won by 77 runs
Sydney Cricket Ground, Sydney
Umpires: PD Parker and RL Parry
Player of the match: CL White (Aus)
