= Mike Vincent =

Australian journalist

- Occupations: print, radio and television journalist, radio personality
- Employer: ABC Radio

Mike Vincent is an Australian print, radio and television journalist. He is also the father of New Zealand cricketer Lou Vincent.

Mike has worked as a radio and newspaper journalist for more than 20 years in Brisbane, Sydney, Canberra, Hobart, and Perth, but mostly in his hometown of Adelaide.

He has spent a period of time working for Radio New Zealand in Auckland.

In early 2001 Mike rejoined the ABC as sports producer-presenter for ABC NewsRadio.

He used his right knee to stop Australian prime minister Malcolm Fraser from closing his Commonwealth car passenger door to get in one more question.

In 2009 Mike began hosting Rock Dinosaurs on Big River FM in New Zealand. It's every Wednesday night August–March 7-9pm. http://bigriverfm.co.nz/

In 2014 he began a new show on Big River FM called Radio Jimi Hendrix every Wednesday night March–August 7-9pm.

In 2016 Vincent self-published his first book The Dead Philosophers Society (SPAV: Socrates Plato Aristotle Vincent). He describes it as attempted satire but is probably just a collection of rants and cheap shots from his radio shows. There have been several more volumes that have evolved into The War on Dickheads. https://thewarondickheads.nz/
