= Pakistan cricket team performance in 2011 =

This is the list of Pakistan cricket team performance in 2011. Pakistan was defeated by India in the 2011 Cricket World Cup.

== Team Performance in 2011 in Tests ==
Rank	Team	Matches	Won	Lost	Draw	% Won
6	Pakistan	10	6	1	3	60.00

vs	Matches	Won	Lost	Draw	% Won
New Zealand	2	1	0	1	50.00
(Cricket West Indies) West Indies	2	1	1	0	50.00
Zimbabwe	1	1	0	0	100.00
Sri Lanka	3	1	0	2	33.33
Bangladesh	2	2	0	0	100.00

== Team Performance in 2011 in ODIs ==
Rank	Team	Matches	Won	Lost	Tie	N/R	% Won
6	Pakistan	32	24	7	0	1	75.00

vs	Matches	Won	Lost	Tie	N/R	% Won
Australia	1	1	0	0	0	100.00
Canada	1	1	0	0	0	100.00
Kenya	1	1	0	0	0	100.00
New Zealand	7	3	3	0	1	42.86
Sri Lanka	6	5	1	0	0	83.33
Zimbabwe	4	4	0	0	0	100.00
(Cricket West Indies) West Indies	6	4	2	0	0	66.67
India	1	0	1	0	0	0.00
(Republic of Ireland) Ireland	2	2	0	0	0	100.00
Bangladesh	3	3	0	0	0	100.00

== Team Performance in 2011 in T20s ==
Rank	Team	Matches	Won	Lost	Tie	N/R	% Won
N/A	Pakistan	5	4	1	0	0	80.00

vs	Matches	Won	Lost	Tie	N/R	% Won
(Cricket West Indies) West Indies	1	0	1	0	0	0.00
Zimbabwe	2	2	0	0	0	100.00
Sri Lanka	1	1	0	0	0	100.00
Bangladesh	1	1	0	0	0	100.00

== Pakistan Overall Performance in 2011 ==
Rank	Team	Matches	Won	Lost	Tied	Draw/N/R	% Won
6	Pakistan	47	34	11	0	2	72.34

== See also ==
- Pakistan cricket team performance in 2010
