= Sajid Mahmood =

English cricketer (born 1981)

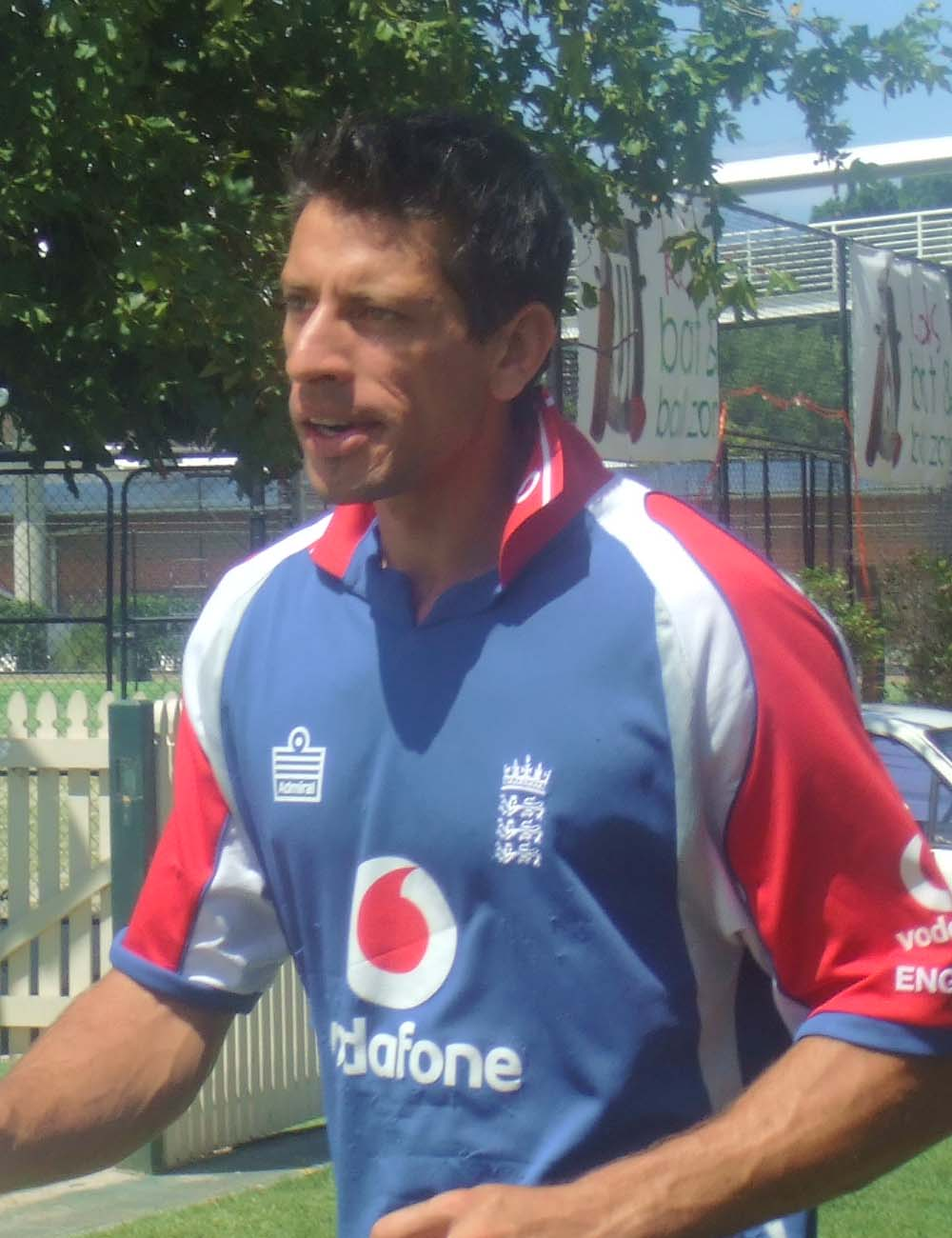

Personal information
- Full name: Sajid Iqbal Mahmood
- Born: 21 December 1981 (age 44); Bolton, Greater Manchester, England
- Nickname: Saj, Makkers
- Height: 6 ft 4 in (1.93 m)
- Batting: Right-handed
- Bowling: Right-arm fast-medium
- Role: Bowler

International information
- National side: England (2004–2010)
- Test debut (cap 633): 11 May 2006 v Sri Lanka
- Last Test: 5 January 2007 v Australia
- ODI debut (cap 182): 4 July 2004 v New Zealand
- Last ODI: 22 November 2009 v South Africa
- ODI shirt no.: 19
- T20I debut (cap 15): 15 June 2006 v Sri Lanka
- Last T20I: 15 November 2009 v South Africa
- T20I shirt no.: 19

Domestic team information
- Years: Team
- 2002–2012: Lancashire (squad no. 19)
- 2010/11: Western Australia
- 2012: Somerset (on loan)
- 2013–2014: Essex

Career statistics
Competition	Test	ODI	FC	LA
Matches	8	26	121	153
Runs scored	81	85	2,178	541
Batting average	8.10	7.72	15.78	9.16
100s/50s	0/0	0/0	0/10	0/0
Top score	34	22*	94	29
Balls bowled	1,130	1,197	17,205	6,683
Wickets	20	30	329	210
Bowling average	38.10	38.94	32.82	28.50
5 wickets in innings	0	0	9	1
10 wickets in match	0	0	2	0
Best bowling	4/22	4/50	6/30	5/16
Catches/stumpings	0/–	1/–	30/–	23/–
- Source: Cricinfo, 30 October 2017

Sajid Iqbal Mahmood (Note: Urdu: ساجد اقبال محمود, romanized: Sājid Iqbāl Maḥmūd) (born 21 December 1981) is a former English cricketer, who played all formats of the game. He is a right-arm fast-medium bowler who played international cricket for England and county cricket for Lancashire and Essex.

== Youth and early career ==
Sajid Iqbal Mahmood's grandfather, Lal Khan Janjua, emigrated from Rawalpindi in Pakistan to England with his family in 1958 after being discharged from the Pakistan Army. The family settled in Halliwell, a residential area of Bolton. Mahmood was born in Bolton, Greater Manchester on 21 December 1981, the son of Shahid Mahmood, and grew up with his family. He has a sister and two brothers and is first cousin to boxer Amir Khan. Khan is five years younger than Mahmood and the two cousins stay close, having grown up living near to each other.

Mahmood began playing club cricket in the Bolton Leagues, and played well enough to be signed by Lancashire in 2002. He made his debut for Lancashire in 2002 whilst on a scholarship with the club.

== Breakthrough ==
He won the NBC Denis Compton Award in 2003; in the same year, he inadvertently broke the hands of Lancashire teammate Andrew Flintoff and England A teammate Alex Gidman, an early indicator of his pace. In September 2003, Mahmood was one of England 14 cricketers selected to train with the England Cricket Board's National Academy during the winter.

Despite having taken only six first-class wickets, Mahmood was chosen for England A's tour to India and Malaysia in 2003–04.

== Return to the county circuit ==
In a County Championship match against Kent, Mahmood suffered a chest injury that threatened to prematurely end his 2008 season.

On 26 November 2008, Mahmood was drafted into England's squad for the last two ODI matches against India in their seven match tour. He and bowler Amjad Khan were called up as replacements for the injured Stuart Broad and Andrew Flintoff. Mahmood and Khan were in Bangalore with England's Performance Programme Squad. The final two ODIs were cancelled after the 2008 Mumbai attacks and the England squad returned home due to safety concerns. Mahmood was part of the England Lions for the winter tour of New Zealand. While Khan debuted for England over the winter, Mahmood did not feature in any matches for the full England side. Despite this, he was selected in England's 25-man performance squad, and was identified by national selector Geoff Miller as being close to playing for England. Although he was part of England's 30-man preliminary squad for the 2009 ICC World Twenty20, he did not make the final squad of 15.

In April, Mahmood was selected to represent the England Lions against the West Indies. Despite being overlooked by England for the first Test of the summer, in May Mahmood secured his career-best bowling figures and his maiden 10-wicket haul. In a Lancashire victory over Worcestershire by six wickets, Mahmood took 6/75 and finished with match figures of 10/140. Mahmood was one of several Lancashire bowlers unable to play in August 2009. He, Glen Chapple, Steven Cheetham, and Tom Smith were injured and Andrew Flintoff and James Anderson were on England duty. As a stop-gap measure, Tom Lungley was loaned by Lancashire from Derbyshire County Cricket Club. After he finished the season with 41 first-class wickets at an average of 34.00, and 24 list A wickets at an average of 23.33, Mahmood was recalled to the England One Day International squad for their tour of South Africa in the winter of 2009.

Mahmood joined Western Australia as an overseas player for the domestic T20 competition during the 2010–11 season. He played in five matches for them, taking five wickets at an average of 30.2.

In June 2011, in a match against Durham, Mahmood took his second ten-wicket haul in first-class cricket. Mahmood attributed his bowling success in 2011 to being more focused on playing for Lancashire; he said that before he had been distracted by trying to earn selection for England and that he performs better when relaxed.

In August 2012, after being dropped from the Lancashire side Mahmood joined injury depleted Somerset until the end of the 2012 season. At the end of the season Mahmood was released by Lancashire. He then joined Essex for the 2013 English domestic season. Later in the 2013 season after an unsuccessful spell Sajid was dropped and was allowed to join Ainsdale CC in the LDCC league until the end of the season where he enjoyed a successful spell of wicket taking and confidence building. Sajid returned to the Essex squad for the 2014 season before being released.

== International career ==
He made his One Day International debut for England against New Zealand at Bristol in July 2004, but his seven overs proved expensive, conceding 56 runs without a wicket. More recently, he toured India with England in early 2006, playing in the third, sixth and seventh ODIs and taking several wickets.

He was included in the Test squad against Sri Lanka in 2006 following injuries to Steve Harmison, James Anderson and Simon Jones, and earned his first cap on 11 May 2006 in the first Test at Lord's, becoming England's 633rd Test player. England reached an imposing first-innings score of 551, and Mahmood took three wickets in his first four overs in Test cricket at the end of the second day, as the Sri Lankan team disintegrated to 91 for 6 at the close. He was unable to add to his tally before Sri Lanka were forced to follow on early on the third day, but added two further wickets in Sri Lanka's more composed second innings on the fourth day.

Mahmood was replaced by Jon Lewis for the third Test against Sri Lanka. However, on 27 July 2006 he was selected ahead of Lewis for the second Test against Pakistan at Old Trafford after Liam Plunkett was ruled out due to injury. Although the pitch at Old Trafford favoured seamers, Mahmood performed relatively poorly. However, he was retained for the Third Test at Headingley. He contributed 34 runs with the bat in England's first innings, but then went for 108 runs over 24 overs, albeit with two wickets, in a high-scoring Pakistan first innings. In the second innings, he took 4 wickets for only 22 runs in 8 overs, contributing significantly to England's series-clinching victory. He featured in the final match of the series, dubbed Ovalgate. He took 2–101 in Pakistan's first innings before the game was forfeited by Pakistan for refusing to take the field during England's second innings.

=== The Ashes 2006–07 ===
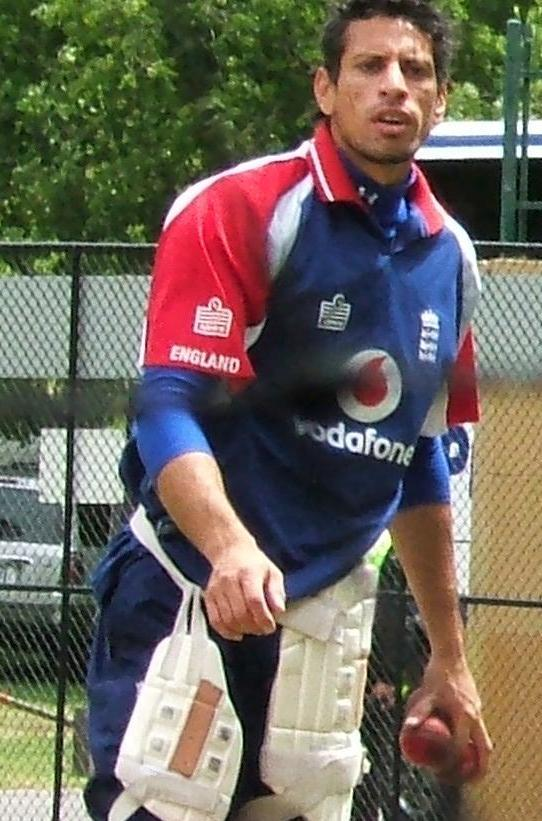
Sajid Mahmood in the nets during the 2006–07 Ashes series in Australia

Mahmood was selected for England's 2006–07 Ashes squad, but James Anderson was selected ahead of him for the first and second tests. For the third Test in Perth Mahmood and Monty Panesar replaced Anderson and Ashley Giles. He featured sporadically in the test, bowling just 7 overs in Australia's first innings and 10 in their second, taking no wickets. He later expressed his unhappiness about not bowling more during the test. Mahmood also played in the ODI match against Australia on 2 February 2007 in Sydney, taking 2 wickets for 38 runs, and sharing the new ball with fellow fast bowler Liam Plunkett. He took the wicket of Brad Hodge by bowling him. He also took the wicket of destructive batsman Matthew Hayden after Hayden had scored 51. Hayden hit the ball straight to Jamie Dalrymple. He has appeared in a Bollywood film called Victory.

=== 2007 World Cup ===
After his successful performances in the Commonwealth Bank Series victory over Australia, Mahmood was shortlisted for the 15-man England squad for the World Cup. Although he wasn't selected for the first few matches, he came into the side against Canada. Against Sri Lanka in the Super Eight stage he produced his best figures in an ODI match, taking the wickets of Sanath Jayasuriya and Kumar Sangakkara in his spell of 4–50. After his successful bowling figures against Sri Lanka, he was picked for the match against Australia. Despite being England's most expensive bowler in that match, he was picked for the following match against Bangladesh, in which he took 3 wickets for 27 runs. England won and Mahmood was awarded Man of the Match.

Although Mahmood emphasised the work he put into improving his consistency in his two years out of the international squad, he was expensive on his come back and conceded 92 runs and took 2 wickets from the 7 overs he bowled in England's two Twenty20 Internationals against South Africa, and played in just one of the ODIs, in which he took 1/41.

== Post-playing career ==
In 2016 Mahmood was director of a clothing company.

Mahmood has coached at Roehampton and Fulham Cricket Club in South London, and as of September 2018, has been Head of Cricket at William Perkin Church of England High School in Greenford, Middlesex.
