= 2006–07 Commonwealth Bank Series =

- Part of the English cricket team in Australia in 2006–07
- Date: 12 January 2007 – 11 February 2007
- Location: Australia
- Result: Won by England (2–0 in final series)
- Player of the series: Ricky Ponting (Aus)
Teams
Australia	England	New Zealand
Captains
Ricky Ponting	Michael Vaughan; Andrew Flintoff	Stephen Fleming
Most runs
Ponting (438) Hayden (382) Clarke (268)	Collingwood (379); Bell (292); Joyce (288)	Taylor (282); Vincent (263); Oram (261)
Most wickets
McGrath (13) Lee (12) Bracken (12)	Flintoff (12); Plunkett (12); Panesar (9)	Bond (11); Franklin (10); Vettori (10)

The Commonwealth Bank Series was the name of the One Day International cricket tournament in Australia for the 2006–07 season. It was a tri-nation series between Australia, England and New Zealand.

Australia booked a place in the final after just seven matches in the tournament, and having participated in just five, with five games left to play. The other place in the final came down to the last match of the series as New Zealand and England both had won only 2 games; England won this semi-final of sorts.

England won the final series by two games to nil to lift the trophy, making it their first major one-day tournament win since 1997 and their first Australian tri-series win since 20 years previous, when they also won the Ashes.

== Fixtures ==
Matches played in the series were as follows:

No.	Date	Team 1	Team 2	Stadium	Location
Group Stage Schedule
1	12 January 2007	AUS	ENG	Melbourne Cricket Ground	Melbourne
2	14 January 2007	AUS	NZ	Bellerive Oval	Hobart
3	16 January 2007	ENG	NZ	Bellerive Oval	Hobart
4	19 January 2007	AUS	ENG	The 'Gabba	Brisbane
5	21 January 2007	AUS	NZ	Sydney Cricket Ground	Sydney
6	23 January 2007	ENG	NZ	Adelaide Oval	Adelaide
7	26 January 2007	AUS	ENG	Adelaide Oval	Adelaide
8	28 January 2007	AUS	NZ	WACA Ground	Perth
9	30 January 2007	ENG	NZ	WACA Ground	Perth
10	2 February 2007	AUS	ENG	Sydney Cricket Ground	Sydney
11	4 February 2007	AUS	NZ	Melbourne Cricket Ground	Melbourne
12	6 February 2007	ENG	NZ	The 'Gabba	Brisbane
Finals Schedule
Final 1	9 February 2007	AUS	ENG	Melbourne Cricket Ground	Melbourne
Final 2	11 February 2007	AUS	ENG	Sydney Cricket Ground	Sydney

== Squads ==
Australia
Name	Style	Domestic team
Captain and Middle Order Batsman
Ricky Ponting	RHB, RM	Tasmania
Vice Captain, Opening Batsman Wicketkeeper
Adam Gilchrist	LHB	Western Australia
Opening Batsman
Matthew Hayden	LHB, RM	Queensland
Middle Order Batsmen
Michael Hussey	LHB, RM	Western Australia
Michael Clarke	RHB, SLA	New South Wales
All-rounders
Andrew Symonds	RHB, RFM / ROB	Queensland
Shane Watson	RHB, RFM	New South Wales
Cameron White	RHB, LB	Victoria
Spin Bowlers
Brad Hogg	LHB, SLC	West Australia
Fast Bowlers
Nathan Bracken	RHB, LFM	New South Wales
Stuart Clark	RHB, RFM	New South Wales
Mitchell Johnson	LHB, LFM	Queensland
Brett Lee	RHB, RF	New South Wales
Glenn McGrath	RHB, RMF	New South Wales
Ben Hilfenhaus	RHB, RFM	Tasmania
Shaun Tait	RHB, RF	South Australia

England
Name	Style	Domestic team
Captain and Opening Batsman
Michael Vaughan	RHB, OB	Yorkshire
Wicketkeepers
Paul Nixon	LHB	Leicestershire
Chris Read	RHB	Nottinghamshire
Opening Batsmen
Mal Loye	RHB, OS	Lancashire
Andrew Strauss	LHB, LM	Middlesex
Middle Order Batsmen
Ian Bell	RHB, RM	Warwickshire
Ravi Bopara	RHB, RMF	Essex
Ed Joyce	LHB, RM	Middlesex
Kevin Pietersen	RHB, OB	Hampshire
All-rounders
Paul Collingwood	RHB, RMF	Durham
Andrew Flintoff	RHB, RF	Lancashire
Spin Bowlers
Jamie Dalrymple	RHB, OB	Middlesex
Monty Panesar	LHB, SLA	Northamptonshire
Fast Bowlers
James Anderson	LHB, RFM	Lancashire
Stuart Broad	LHB, RFM	Leicestershire
Jon Lewis	RHB, RMF	Gloucestershire
Sajid Mahmood	RHB, RFM	Lancashire
Liam Plunkett	RHB, RFM	Durham
Chris Tremlett	RHB, RFM	Hampshire

New Zealand
Name	Style	Domestic team
Captain and Middle-Order Batsman
Stephen Fleming	LHB	Wellington
Wicketkeeper and Opening Batsman
Brendon McCullum	RHB	Canterbury
Opening Batsman
Nathan Astle	RHB, RM	Canterbury
Lou Vincent	RHB, RM	Auckland
Middle Order Batsmen
Peter Fulton	RHB, RM	Canterbury
Hamish Marshall	RHB, RM	Northern Districts
Ross Taylor	RHB, OB	Central Districts
All-rounders
Andre Adams	RHB, RFM	Auckland
Craig McMillan	RHB, RM	Canterbury
Jacob Oram	LHB, RFM	Central Districts
Scott Styris	RHB, RM	Auckland
Spin Bowlers
Daniel Vettori	LHB, SLA	Northern Districts
Jeetan Patel	RHB, OB	Wellington
Fast Bowlers
Shane Bond	RHB, RF	Canterbury
James Franklin	LHB, LFM	Wellington
Mark Gillespie	RHB, RFM	Wellington
Michael Mason	RHB, RFM	Central Districts

== Group stage table ==
Commonwealth Bank Series after 12 matches
Pos	Team	Pld	W	L	T	NR	BP	Pts	NRR	For	Against
1	Australia	8	7	1	0	0	3	31	0.667	1860/355.3	1826/400
2	England	8	3	5	0	0	1	13	−0.608	1655/399.5	1702/358.3
3	New Zealand	8	2	6	0	0	1	9	−0.007	2016/400	2003/396.5

Source: Points table from Cricinfo, retrieved 6 February 2007

=== Points system ===
A win earns 4 points, a tie or no result = 2 points, a bonus = 1 point and a loss = 0 points.

If the team batting first match and restricts its opponents to 80% of its total, it gains a bonus point. If the team batting second wins the match in 40 overs, it gains a bonus point.

A team's run rate will be calculated by reference to the runs scored in an innings divided by the number of overs faced.

In the event of teams finishing on equal points, the right to play in the final will be determined as follows:

1. The team with the most wins
2. If still equal, the team with the most wins over the other team(s) who are equal on points and have the same number of wins
3. If still equal, the team with the most bonus points
4. If still equal, the team with the highest net run rate

== Group stage matches ==
=== Match 1: Australia v England, 12 January ===
12 January 2007
14:15 (D/N)
Scorecard

England; 8/242 (50 overs)	v	Australia; 2/246 (45.2 overs)
KP Pietersen 82 (91); NW Bracken 3/46 [9]		RT Ponting 82* (96); JWM Dalrymple 1/38 [10]

Australia won by 8 wickets
Melbourne Cricket Ground, Melbourne
Attendance:79,000
Umpires: IL Howell (SA) and SJA Taufel (Aus)
Player of the match: AC Gilchrist (Aus)

England won the toss and elected to bat. Kevin Pietersen was the only England player to get settled, scoring 82. It was debated whether this effected his dismissal getting out caught playing a big shot, slightly after a Glenn McGrath bouncer which injured Pietersen for the rest of the tour. In the end England scored a mediocre total of 242. The English team's bowling attack couldn't have got to a worse start after Gilchrist and Hayden smashed 16 off the first over. After Hayden and Gilchrist got out, Ponting and Clarke took over both going above 50. Australia cruised to an 8 wicket victory with 5 overs remaining.

=== Match 2: Australia v New Zealand, 14 January ===
14 January 2007
10:00
Scorecard

Australia; 8/289 (50 overs)	v	New Zealand; 184 (38.3 overs)
A Symonds 69 (70); SE Bond 4/61 [10]		RL Taylor 84 (82); MG Johnson 2/27 [7]

Australia won by 105 runs
Bellerive Oval, Hobart
Umpires: Asad Rauf (Pak) and DJ Harper (Aus)
Player of the match: A Symonds (Aus)

All of the Australian batsman scored reasonable scores that gave Australia a big first innings total. Shane Bond got a one-day hat trick while cleaning up the tail. New Zealand couldn't chase down Australia, Andrew Symonds named man of the match.

=== Match 3: England v New Zealand, 16 January ===
16 January 2007
10:00
Scorecard

New Zealand; 9/205 (50 overs)	v	England; 7/206 (49.5 overs)
NJ Astle 45 (63); JM Anderson 4/42 [10]		A Flintoff 72* (75); JS Patel 2/34 [10]

England won by 3 wickets
Bellerive Oval, Hobart
Umpires: Asad Rauf (Pak) and SJ Davis (Aus)
Player of the match: A Flintoff (Eng)

Man of the match Andrew Flintoff scored 72 and hit the winning run with just one ball remaining to get their first win on tour.

=== Match 4: Australia v England, 19 January ===
19 January 2007
13:15 (D/N)
Scorecard

England; 155 (42 overs)	v	Australia; 6/156 (38.4 overs)
MB Loye 36 (36); GD McGrath 3/24 [8]		MEK Hussey 46* (73); J Lewis 4/36 [10]

Australia won by 4 wickets
The Gabba, Brisbane
Umpires: IL Howell (SA) and DJ Harper (Aus)
Player of the match: MEK Hussey (Aus)

England were bowled out for a low score and got early wickets and slowed the run rate to even up the match. Mike Hussey had a controversial decision being not out after nicking a ball to Nixon. He went on to become the man of the match for his 46 including a slog sweep which went for six.

=== Match 5: Australia v New Zealand, 21 January ===
21 January 2007
14:15 (D/N)
Scorecard

New Zealand; 218 (47.4 overs)	v	Australia; 8/224 (48.4 overs)
CD McMillan 89 (87); SR Clark 4/54 [10]		MJ Clarke 75 (111); MR Gillespie 2/34 [10]

Australia won by 2 wickets
Sydney Cricket Ground, Sydney
Umpires: Asad Rauf (Pak) and SJA Taufel (Aus)
Player of the match: MJ Clarke (Aus)

Craig McMillan saved the Kiwis from a low score after they had lost early wickets. New Zealand bowled well early with Clarke and Hussey rescuing the Aussies. This was also Nathan Astle's last match, retiring due to poor form.

=== Match 6: England v New Zealand, 23 January ===
23 January 2007
13:45 (D/N)
Scorecard

New Zealand; 210 (50 overs)	v	England; 120 (37.5 overs)
JDP Oram 86 (89); A Flintoff 4/21 [10]		EC Joyce 47 (70); DL Vettori 4/24 [9]

New Zealand won by 90 runs
Adelaide Oval, Adelaide
Umpires: DJ Harper (Aus) and IL Howell (SA)
Player of the match: JDP Oram (NZ)

=== Match 7: Australia v England, 26 January ===
26 January 2007
13:45 (D/N)
Scorecard

England; 110 (34.3 overs)	v	Australia; 1/111 (24.3 overs)
IR Bell 35 (31); MG Johnson 4/45 [10]		RT Ponting 51* (61)

Australia won by 9 wickets
Adelaide Oval, Adelaide
Umpires: SJ Davis (Aus) and IL Howell (SA)
Player of the match: MG Johnson (Aus)

England reached a new low bowled out for 110 in what was regarded as their worst performance on tour.

=== Match 8: Australia v New Zealand, 28 January ===
28 January 2007
13:30 (D/N)
Scorecard

Australia; 5/343 (50 overs)	v	New Zealand; 5/335 (50 overs)
ML Hayden 117 (111); CD McMillan 1/26 [3]		JDP Oram 101* (72); MJ Clarke 2/48 [9]

Australia won by 8 runs
WACA Ground, Perth
Umpires: Asad Rauf (Pak) and SJA Taufel (Aus)
Player of the match: RT Ponting (Aus)

Hayden and Ponting both smashed hundreds to give Australia a huge first innings score. New Zealand did well chasing, falling just short with Oram also getting a century.

=== Match 9: England v New Zealand, 30 January ===
30 January 2007
13:30 (D/N)
Scorecard

New Zealand; 7/318 (50 overs)	v	England; 8/260 (50 overs)
L Vincent 76 (111); LE Plunkett 3/54 [9]		EC Joyce 66 (82); CD McMillan 2/38 [7]

New Zealand won by 58 runs
WACA Ground, Perth
Umpires: Asad Rauf (Pak) and SJ Davis (Aus)
Player of the match: L Vincent (NZ)

=== Match 10: Australia v England, 2 February ===
2 February 2007
14:15 (D/N)
Scorecard

England; 7/292 (50 overs)	v	Australia; 200 (38.5 overs)
EC Joyce 107 (142); GD McGrath 2/51 [10]		ML Hayden 51 (62); LE Plunkett 3/23 [9.5]

England won by 92 runs
Sydney Cricket Ground, Sydney
Umpires: DJ Harper (Aus) and IL Howell (SA)
Player of the match: EC Joyce (Eng)

England finally beat Australia with Ed Joyce scoring a 100 as England almost reached 300. Plunkett bowled Gilchrist on the first ball, while Symonds had to retire hurt.

=== Match 11: Australia v New Zealand, 4 February ===
4 February 2007
14:15 (D/N)
Scorecard

New Zealand; 7/290 (50 overs)	v	Australia; 5/291 (48.2 overs)
L Vincent 90 (113); MJ Clarke 2/45 [9]		RT Ponting 104 (113); JEC Franklin 2/56 [10]

Australia won by 5 wickets
Melbourne Cricket Ground, Melbourne
Umpires: Asad Rauf (Pak) and SJ Davis (Aus)
Player of the match: RT Ponting (Aus)

=== Match 12: England v New Zealand, 6 February ===
6 February 2007
13:15 (D/N)
Scorecard

England; 7/270 (50 overs)	v	New Zealand; 8/256 (50 overs)
PD Collingwood 106 (121); SE Bond 4/46 [10]		SP Fleming 106 (149); LE Plunkett 3/60 [10]

England won by 14 runs
The Gabba, Brisbane
Umpires: DJ Harper (Aus) and IL Howell (SA)
Player of the match: PD Collingwood (Eng)

Paul Collingwood was back in form getting his first 100 since the Adelaide Test match. The captain Fleming then led from the front scoring a 100 despite controversially running out his partner.

== Final series ==
=== First match: Australia vs England, 9 February ===
9 February 2007
14:15 (D/N)
Scorecard

Australia; 252 (48.3 overs)	v	England; 6/253 (49.3 overs)
ML Hayden 82 (102); A Flintoff 3/41 [10]		PD Collingwood 120* (133); B Lee 3/41 [10]

England won by 4 wickets
Melbourne Cricket Ground, Melbourne
Umpires: Asad Rauf (Pak) and DJ Harper (Aus)
Player of the match: PD Collingwood (Eng)

=== Second match: Australia vs England, 11 February ===
11 February 2007
14:15 (D/N)
Scorecard

England; 8/246 (50 overs)	v	Australia; 8/152 (27 overs)
PD Collingwood 70 (90); NW Bracken 2/38 [10]		BJ Hodge 49 (46); LE Plunkett 3/43 [6]

England won by 34 runs (D/L method)
Sydney Cricket Ground, Sydney
Umpires: SJ Davis (Aus) and IL Howell (SA)
Player of the match: PD Collingwood (Eng)

English achieved slightly above average score, but it was expected Australia should chase it down. However, rain interrupted Australia's innings several times, and the interruptions, the lost wickets, the adjusted target and slow outfield made the required run rate difficult. England ensured victory with further wickets as Australia tried to progress the score. It was a huge victory for England, who had otherwise had a terrible tour and who at the start of the series were playing poor cricket. The defeat of Australia was a significant blow to the reigning world champions, they also lost their next three matches in New Zealand.
