= Zulqarnain Haider (cricketer) =

Pakistani cricketer (born 1986)

Personal information
- Full name: Zulqarnain Haider
- Born: 23 April 1986 (age 40); Lahore, Punjab, Pakistan
- Batting: Right-handed
- Role: Wicket-keeper-batter

International information
- National side: Pakistan (2007-2010)
- Only Test (cap 201): 6 August 2010 v England
- ODI debut (cap 179): 29 October 2010 v South Africa
- Last ODI: 5 November 2010 v South Africa
- T20I debut (cap 15): 3 February 2007 v South Africa
- Last T20I: 27 October 2010 v South Africa

Career statistics
Competition	Test	ODI	FC	LA
Matches	1	4	92	69
Runs scored	88	48	3,656	702
Batting average	44.00	24.00	30.21	16.32
100s/50s	0/1	0/0	3/20	0/2
Top score	88	19*	161	90
Catches/stumpings	2/0	1/1	279/9	76/18
- Source: ESPN Cricinfo, 12 December 2013

Zulqarnain Haider (Urdu: ذولقرنین حیدر, born 23 April 1986) is a Pakistani former cricketer who has played for the national team. He had a very short international career and dramatically announced his retirement after a cameo innings of last wicket victory in the fourth ODI of the series against South Africa in 2010. He fled to London fearing threats from bookies.

Having played for Pakistan Under-19s, Zulqarnain was called up to the senior national side in 2010 as a cover for wicketkeeper Kamran Akmal during the tour of England. Zulqarnain made his Test debut during the tour, but a broken finger limited him to just one match. Later that year, he made his One Day International (ODI) debut against South Africa, against whom he has played all four of his ODIs to date. After the fourth match, Zulqarnain fled to London amid fears for his safety.

A right-handed batsman, Zulqarnain, has represented both Lahore Blues and Pakistan Telecommunication Company Limited in Pakistani domestic cricket, and now plays for Zarai Taraqiati Bank Ltd.

== Early and personal life ==
Haider was born in the Pakistani city of Lahore. His mother died from cancer in 1998 when he was 12. He decided to donate half his match fee from his test debut to the Shaukat Khanum Memorial Cancer Hospital & Research Centre. In August 2010, Haider's father, who was suffering from hepatitis C, slipped into a coma.

== International career ==
With regular wicketkeeper Kamran Akmal suffering from a prolonged period of poor form in both his roles as wicketkeeper and batsman, Pakistan were searching for a backup. Zulqarnain was drafted into Pakistan's 17-man squad for the tour to South Africa in January 2007. He made his Twenty20 International debut on the tour, assuming wicketkeeping duties from Akmal who acted as a specialist batsman. South Africa won by ten wickets, and Zulqarnain contributed just five runs to Pakistan's total of 129 all out.

Zulqarnain had to wait more than three years for his next international match. In July 2010, Pakistan toured England for four Tests, five ODIs, and two T20Is; Haider was included in the touring squad. After a pair and several missed chances behind the stumps, Akmal was dropped in favour of Zulqarnain. In the first match, Zulqarnain was dismissed off the first ball by fast bowler Stuart Broad, and nearly succumbed to his first ball in the second match. Initially, he was given out to spinner Graeme Swann, Zulqarnain then reviewed the decision and survived. He exploited the opportunity and made 88 runs before getting dismissed, and enthusiastically celebrated his half-century. Days later, it was revealed that Haider had suffered a fractured finger that could have been exacerbated after being hit on the hand by a throw from Stuart Broad. He played no further part in the series. When Pakistan played South Africa in October 2010 for two T20Is and five ODIs, Zulqarnain was included in the 15-man squad as the only wicketkeeper. In the first four ODIs, he took three catches and scored just 48 runs.

== Threats and international retirement ==
On the morning of 8 November, before the fifth ODI against South Africa started, Zulqarnain left the team without permission. Later that day, he arrived in London. Zulqarnain decided to seek asylum in the United Kingdom, a move which was not supported by Pakistan's government which insisted Zulqarnain should have turned to them first. The Pakistan Cricket Board (PCB) suspended Haider's contract. On 10 November, Haider announced his retirement from international cricket. He explained that he had been asked to lose the fourth ODI on 4 November and that after hitting the winning runs he had received threats against his life and family. In April 2011, Zulqarnain withdrew his application for asylum and returned to Pakistan after receiving assurances from Rehman Malik, Pakistan's interior minister, about his safety. Malik stated that Zulqarnain Haider would be given "full security".

== Return to cricket ==
On 12 May 2011, Haider announced that he was withdrawing his retirement from international cricket. The PCB set up a disciplinary committee, which imposed a fine of 500,000 rupees on Haider for breaching the team's code of conduct by going to London without permission. According to the PCB, Haider "had no proof of any wrongdoing against any player or official of the board, and withdrew all his allegations".

He was passed over for selection during Faysal Bank T20, but was included by Zarai Taraqiati Bank Limited for the first-class season. He played his first match for the team on 6 October, taking three catches but failing to score a run in his single innings.

== See also ==
- One Test Wonder
