= West Indian cricket team in India in 2006–07 =

International cricket tour

West Indies cricket team in India in 2006–07
	West Indies	India
- Dates: 21 January – 31 January 2007
Captains	Brian Lara	Rahul Dravid

One Day International series
- Results: India won the 4-match series 3–1
Most runs	Shivnarine Chanderpaul (229)	Rahul Dravid (211)
Most wickets	Dwayne Bravo (6)	Ajit Agarkar (7)
- Player of the series: Sachin Tendulkar (Ind)

The West Indies cricket team toured India for 4-match ODI series from 21 January 2007 to 31 January 2007.

== Squads ==
ODIs
India	West Indies
Rahul Dravid (c); Sachin Tendulkar; Ajit Agarkar; MS Dhoni (wk); Gautam Gambhir; Sourav Ganguly; Dinesh Karthik; Zaheer Khan; Ramesh Powar; Suresh Raina; Joginder Sharma; Harbhajan Singh; R. P. Singh; S. Sreesanth; Robin Uthappa	Brian Lara (c); Ian Bradshaw; Dwayne Bravo; Shivnarine Chanderpaul; Rayad Emrit; Chris Gayle; Runako Morton; Daren Powell; Denesh Ramdin (wk); Marlon Samuels; Lendl Simmons; Dwayne Smith; Devon Smith; Jerome Taylor

== ODI series ==
=== 1st ODI ===
21 January 2007
Scorecard

India; 338/3 (50 overs)	v	West Indies; 324/8 (50 overs)
Sourav Ganguly 98 (110); Chris Gayle 2/51 (9 overs)		Shivnarine Chanderpaul 149*; Zaheer Khan 2/48 (10 overs)

India won by 14 runs
Vidarbha Cricket Association Ground, Nagpur,
Umpires: Billy Bowden (NZ) and Suresh Shastri (Ind)
Player of the match: Shivnarine Chanderpaul (WI)

- West Indies won the toss and elected to field.

=== 2nd ODI ===
24 January 2007
Scorecard

India; 189 (48.2 overs)	v	West Indies; 169 (48.2 overs)
Dinesh Karthik 63 (87); Daren Powell 4/27 (10 overs)		Shivnarine Chanderpaul 67 (125); Ramesh Powar 3/42 (10 overs)

India won by 20 runs
Barabati Stadium, Cuttack
Umpires: Billy Bowden (NZ) and Amiesh Saheba (Ind)
Player of the match: Dinesh Karthik (Ind)

- India won the toss and elected to bat.

=== 3rd ODI ===
27 January 2007
Scorecard

India; 268 (48 overs)	v	West Indies; 270/7 (43.4 overs)
Robin Uthappa 70 (41); Dwayne Bravo 4/39 (9 overs)		Marlon Samuels 98 (95); Ajit Agarkar 3/45 (10 overs)

West Indies won by 3 wickets
M. A. Chidambaram Stadium, Chennai
Umpires: Billy Bowden (NZ) and Suresh Shastri (Ind)
Player of the match: Marlon Samuels (WI)

- West Indies won the toss and elected to field first.
- Rayad Emrit (WI) made his ODI debut.

=== 4th ODI ===
31 January 2007
Scorecard

India; 341/3 (50 overs)	v	West Indies; 181 (41.4 overs)
Sachin Tendulkar 100*; Chris Gayle 1/34 (8 overs)		Marlon Samuels 53 (63); Anil Kumble 2/27 (7 overs)

India won by 160 runs
IPCL Sports Complex Ground, Vadodara
Umpires: Billy Bowden (NZ) and Amiesh Saheba (Ind)
Player of the match: Sachin Tendulkar (Ind)

- West Indies won the toss and elected to field first.
