= Pakistani cricket team in South Africa in 2006–07 =

2007 Series of Pakistani cricket in South Africa

Pakistan in South Africa 2006-07
	South Africa	Pakistan
- Dates: 6 January 2007 – 14 February 2007
Captains	Graeme Smith	Inzamam-ul-Haq

Test series
- Result: South Africa won the 3-match series 2–1
Most runs	Jacques Kallis (272)	Younis Khan (226)
Most wickets	Makhaya Ntini (19)	Mohammad Asif (19)
- Player of the series: Jacques Kallis

One Day International series
- Results: South Africa won the 5-match series 3–1
Most runs	AB de Villiers (231)	Mohammad Yousuf (245)
Most wickets	Shaun Pollock (9)	Shahid Afridi (5)
- Player of the series: Shaun Pollock

Twenty20 International series
- Results: South Africa won the 1-match series 1–0
Most runs	Graeme Smith (71)	Mohammad Hafeez (25)
Most wickets	Alfonso Thomas (3)	
- Player of the series: Loots Bosman

The Pakistan national cricket team toured South Africa for three Tests, five ODIs and one T20 from 6 January to 14 February 2007.

South Africa won the Test series 2–1.

South Africa also won the T20.

South Africa won the 5-match ODI series 3–1 with one game ending with no result.

== Tour match ==
6–8 January 2007
Scorecard

Pakistanis	v	Rest of South Africa
485/9dec (111.1 overs); Mohammad Hafeez 108 (119); Albie Morkel 5/113 (26 overs)		383 (113.1 overs); Arno Jacobs 143 (227); Shahid Nazir 5/61 (21 overs)
96/2 (20 overs); Mohammad Hafeez 48* (56); Yusuf Abdullah 2/21 (5 overs)

Match drawn
De Beers Diamond Oval, Kimberley
Umpires: Brian Jerling (SA) and Rudi Koertzen (SA)

- Pakistanis won the toss and elected to bat.
- This match was not first-class. 13 players on each side (11 bat, 11 bowl)

== Test series ==
=== Squads ===
==== Pakistan ====
1. Inzamam-ul-Haq (captain)
2. Younis Khan (vice captain)
3. Mohammad Hafeez
4. Imran Farhat
5. Yasir Hameed
6. Faisal Iqbal
7. Kamran Akmal (wicket keeper)
8. Shahid Nazir
9. Naved-ul-Hasan
10. Danish Kaneria
11. Mohammad Asif
12. Asim Kamal
13. Mohammad Sami
14. Mohammad Yousuf
15. Shoaib Akhtar
16. Umar Gul
17. Zulqarnain Haider (wicket keeper)

==== South Africa ====
1. Graeme Smith (captain)
2. Jacques Kallis (vice captain)
3. AB de Villiers
4. Hashim Amla
5. Ashwell Prince
6. Herschelle Gibbs
7. Mark Boucher (wicket keeper)
8. Shaun Pollock
9. Paul Harris
10. André Nel
11. Makhaya Ntini
12. Paul Adams
13. Andrew Hall
14. Morné Morkel
15. Jacques Rudolph
16. Dale Steyn

=== 1st Test ===
Pakistan won the toss and elected to bat first.
Day 1: Pakistan 242/5.
Day 2: Pakistan 313, South Africa 254/4.
Day 3: Pakistan 313 & 103/2, South Africa 417.
Day 4: Pakistan 313 & 302, South Africa 417 & 69/2.

11–15 January 2007
Scorecard

Pakistan	v	South Africa
313 (96.5 overs); Younis Khan 68 (110); Makhaya Ntini 5/83 (24 overs)		417 (117.5 overs); Ashwell Prince 138 (214); Mohammad Asif 5/89 (27.5 overs)
302 (96.2 overs); Imran Farhat 68 (168); Paul Harris 4/46 (20.2 overs)		199/3 (60.5 overs); Hashim Amla 64* (166); Mohammad Asif 2/56 (14 overs)

South Africa won by 7 wickets
Centurion Park, Centurion
Umpires: Steve Bucknor (WI) and Billy Doctrove (WI)
Player of the match: Hashim Amla (SA)

- Pakistan won the toss and elected to bat.
- Mark Boucher (SA) played in his 100th Test.

=== 2nd Test ===
South Africa won the toss and chose to bat first.
Day 1: South Africa 124, Pakistan 135/6.
Day 2: South Africa 124 & 115/3, Pakistan 265. Makhaya Ntini becomes the 22nd bowler, and third South African, to reach 300 Test wickets.
Day 3: South Africa 124 & 331, Pakistan 265 & 8/0.

19–22 January 2007
Scorecard

South Africa	v	Pakistan
124 (40.0 overs); Mark Boucher 35 (52); Shoaib Akhtar 4/36 (11 overs)		265 (76.0 overs); Inzamam-ul-Haq 92* (142); Makhaya Ntini 6/59 (21 overs)
331 (133.2 overs); Jacques Kallis 91 (226); Mohammad Asif 5/76 (38 overs)		191/5 (57.3 overs); Younis Khan 67* (125); Shaun Pollock 2/47 (13 overs)

Pakistan won by 5 wickets
St. George's Park, Port Elizabeth
Umpires: Billy Doctrove (WI) and Peter Parker (Aus)
Player of the match: Inzamam-ul-Haq (Pak)

- South Africa won the toss and elected to bat.
- The match was scheduled for five days but completed in four.

=== 3rd Test ===
South Africa won the toss and chose to field first.
Day 1: Pakistan 157, South Africa 131/5.
Day 2: Pakistan 157 & 186, South Africa 183 & 36/2.

26–28 January 2007
Scorecard

Pakistan	v	South Africa
157 (43.1 overs); Mohammad Yousuf 83 (90); Jacques Kallis 4/42 (11 overs)		183 (53.0 overs); Graeme Smith 64 (79); Danish Kaneria 3/44 (20 overs)
186 (51.2 overs); Yasir Hameed 35 (57); Dale Steyn 3/47 (13 overs)		161/5 (64.0 overs); Ashwell Prince 59 (141); Mohammad Asif 2/43 (21 overs)

South Africa won by 5 wickets
Newlands Cricket Ground, Cape Town
Umpires: Steve Bucknor (WI) and Peter Parker (Aus)
Player of the match: Jacques Kallis (SA)

- South Africa won the toss and elected to field.
- The match was scheduled for five days but completed in three.

== T20I series ==
=== Only T20I ===
2 February 2007 (N)
Scorecard

Pakistan; 129/8 (20 overs)	v	South Africa; 132/0 (11.3 overs)
Mohammad Hafeez 25 (21); Alfonso Thomas 3/25 (4 overs)		Graeme Smith 71* (40)

South Africa won by 10 wickets
Wanderers Stadium, Johannesburg
Umpires: Brian Jerling (SA) and Rudi Koertzen (SA)
Player of the match: Loots Bosman (SA)

- South Africa won the toss and elected to field.

== ODI series ==
=== Squads ===
==== Pakistan ====
1. Inzamam-ul-Haq (captain)
2. Younis Khan (vice captain)
3. Abdul Razzaq
4. Abdur Rehman
5. Imran Farhat
6. Imran Nazir
7. Kamran Akmal (wicket keeper)
8. Mohammad Asif
9. Mohammad Hafeez
10. Mohammad Sami
11. Mohammad Yousuf
12. Naved-ul-Hasan
13. Shabbir Ahmed
14. Shahid Afridi
15. Umar Gul
16. Yasir Hameed
17. Zulqarnain Haider (wicket keeper)

==== South Africa ====
1. Graeme Smith (captain)
2. Jacques Kallis (vice captain)
3. Loots Bosman
4. Mark Boucher (wicket keeper)
5. Abraham de Villiers (wicket keeper)
6. Herschelle Gibbs
7. Andrew Hall
8. Justin Kemp
9. Charl Langeveldt
10. André Nel
11. Makhaya Ntini
12. Robin Peterson
13. Shaun Pollock
14. Ashwell Prince
15. Roger Telemachus

=== 1st ODI ===
4 February 2007
Scorecard

South Africa; 392/6 (50 overs)	v	Pakistan; 228 (46.4 overs)
Jacques Kallis 88* (85); Shahid Afridi 2/42 (10.0)		Shoaib Malik 52* (84); Jacques Kallis 3/34 (5.0)

South Africa won by 164 runs
Centurion Park, Centurion
Umpires: Rudi Koertzen (SA) and Peter Parker (Aus)
Player of the match: Jacques Kallis (SA)

- Pakistan won the toss and elected to field

=== 2nd ODI ===
7 February 2007 (D/N)
Scorecard

Pakistan; 351/4 (50 overs)	v	South Africa; 210 (40 overs)
Mohammad Yousuf 101* (111); Graeme Smith 1/36 (7.0)		AB de Villiers 43 (46); Shahid Afridi 3/25 (9.0)

Pakistan won by 141 runs
Kingsmead Cricket Ground, Durban
Umpires: Steve Bucknor (WI) and Brian Jerling (SA)
Player of the match: Younis Khan (Pak)

- Pakistan won the toss and elected to bat.

=== 3rd ODI ===
9 February 2007 (D/N)
Scorecard

Pakistan; 245/8 (49.5 overs)	v	South Africa
Mohammad Yousuf 79 (98); Andrew Hall 4/35 (10.0)

No result
St George's Park Cricket Ground, Port Elizabeth
Umpires: Steve Bucknor (WI) and Rudi Koertzen (SA)

- Pakistan won the toss and elected to bat.

=== 4th ODI ===
11 February 2007
Scorecard

Pakistan; 107 (45.4 overs)	v	South Africa; 113/0 (14 overs)
Inzamam-ul-Haq 45* (97); Shaun Pollock 2/13 (10.0)		Graeme Smith 56* (44)

South Africa won by 10 wickets
Newlands Cricket Ground, Cape Town
Umpires: Russell Tiffin (Zim) and Brian Jerling (SA)
Player of the match: Shaun Pollock (SA)

- South Africa won the toss and elected to field.

=== 5th ODI ===
14 February 2007 (D/N)
Scorecard

Pakistan; 153 (40.5 overs)	v	South Africa; 156/1 (28.2 overs)
Shoaib Malik 43* (70); Shaun Pollock 5/23 (10.0)		AB de Villiers 71* (86); Jacques Kallis 71* (89); Mohammed Asif 1/24 (5.0)

South Africa won by 9 wickets
Wanderers Stadium, Johannesburg
Umpires: Russell Tiffin (Zim) and Rudi Koertzen (SA)
Player of the match: Shaun Pollock (SA)

- Pakistan won the toss and elected to bat.
