= Lou Vincent =

New Zealand cricketer

Personal information
- Born: 11 November 1978 (age 48); Warkworth, Auckland, New Zealand
- Batting: Right-handed
- Bowling: Right-arm medium
- Role: Opening batsman

International information
- National side: New Zealand (2001–2007)
- Test debut (cap 217): 30 November 2001 v Australia
- Last Test: 16 November 2007 v South Africa
- ODI debut (cap 121): 6 February 2001 v Sri Lanka
- Last ODI: 16 December 2007 v Australia
- ODI shirt no.: 40
- T20I debut (cap 19): 16 February 2006 v West Indies
- Last T20I: 11 December 2007 v Australia

Domestic team information
- Years: Team
- 1997/98–2012/13: Auckland
- 2005: Suffolk
- 2006: Worcestershire
- 2008: Lancashire
- 2010: Northamptonshire
- 2011: Sussex County Cricket Club
- 2013: Khulna Royal Bengals

Career statistics
Competition	Test	ODI	FC	LA
Matches	23	102	98	220
Runs scored	1,332	2,413	5,184	6,079
Batting average	34.15	27.11	34.56	30.70
100s/50s	3/9	3/11	10/29	11/30
Top score	224	172	224	172
Balls bowled	6	20	1,009	257
Wickets	0	1	10	7
Bowling average	–	25.00	53.50	37.00
5 wickets in innings	–	0	0	0
10 wickets in match	–	0	0	0
Best bowling	–	1/0	2/37	3/7
Catches/stumpings	19/–	41/–	113/–	128/3
- Source: ESPNcricinfo, 18 May 2014

Lou Vincent (born 11 November 1978) is a former New Zealand cricketer and opening batsman. He represented New Zealand in Test match, One Day International and Twenty20 International cricket as well as playing for Auckland in New Zealand domestic cricket and Worcestershire and Lancashire in English domestic cricket.

In December 2013, it emerged that Vincent was being investigated by the International Cricket Council's anti-corruption unit (ACSU) in relation to allegations of his involvement in the spot-fixing of dozens of professional cricket matches, including matches in the Indian Cricket League, the ECB 40, the Bangladesh Premier League and the Champions League Twenty20.

In June 2014, the Bangladesh Cricket Board found him guilty for not alerting authorities that he had been approached and banned him for three years. On 1 July 2014, he accepted that he was involved in match fixing on many occasions. The England and Wales Cricket Board imposed a lifetime ban on Vincent playing in any form of cricket, applying to sanctioned matches by the ECB, the International Cricket Council or any other national cricket federation. On 8 December 2023, his ban from domestic cricket was lifted, it remains in place for international cricket. In March 2026 he joined Ibiza Cricket Club as captain, winning the Balearic Cup in May 2026.

== Early and personal life ==
Vincent was born in Warkworth, New Zealand, and is the son of well known ABC NewsRadio sports announcer Mike Vincent. Vincent became interested in cricket at an early age as his father used to represent Eden Roskill Cricket Club of Auckland in first grade cricket and took Lou to all the international matches at Eden Park.

At the age of 15, his parents separated with Mike and Lou moving to Adelaide in Australia where Lou began playing in the age-tournaments. After Vincent was left out of several important age-group games by his coach, he decided to move back to New Zealand at the age of 18.

When Vincent returned to New Zealand he had the opportunity to play for New Zealand in the 1998 Under 19 Cricket World Cup. He played for Esholt Cricket Club of the Bradford Cricket League in England during the off season while continuing to play for Auckland in New Zealand domestic cricket. He also considered jockeying as a career and has umpired Australian rules football.

In 2023, Vincent was living in the Southland town of Lumsden.

== Domestic career ==
=== First-class cricket ===
Vincent played for Auckland from 1997 to 2008, competing in the Plunket Shield First Class competition, the Ford Trophy Domestic One Day competition and the HRV Cup Twenty20 competition. In 2006, Vincent signed for Worcestershire to play county cricket for part of the English season. He had an excellent debut on 25 June, making 83 from 91 balls to help set up a 50-run win over Yorkshire in the C&G Trophy.

Lancashire League team Ramsbottom announced that they had signed Vincent as a professional for the 2008 season despite strong interest from the Australian domestic team Southern Redbacks in signing him. Vincent replaced the previous club professional, Sunil Joshi. Vincent had also played for Central Lancashire Cricket League team Rochdale in 2005 where he had an impressive league tally for the season of 656 before having to miss the last 10 games of the league after being called up for New Zealand's training camp ahead of a series in Zimbabwe.

While playing for Ramsbottom, Vincent signed for Lancashire as a replacement overseas player for the 2008 Twenty20 tournament. He replaced Mohammed Yousuf as the club's overseas player, who himself had replaced the Australian Brad Hodge – both were on international duty. Lancashire's cricket manager, Mike Watkinson, said that the club "have brought in a player with a great reputation in the format who will add firepower to our top order. He is an exciting player and excellent fielder, just what we need for Twenty20 cricket".

Vincent made his debut during the Championship game at Old Trafford between Lancashire and Nottinghamshire. He made 5 in the first innings and 19 in the second innings with the match finishing in a draw. Vincent made his Lancashire Twenty20 debut against Leicestershire hitting 31 from 26 balls with Lancashire winning the game by 52 runs.

During Lancashire's seventh Twenty20 group game against Derbyshire at Old Trafford, Vincent hit 102 from 63 balls including 11 fours and three sixes with a strike rate of 161.90. Lancashire won the game by 9 wickets and Vincent was named man of the match. Through this innings, Vincent became the fourth Lancashire player to hit a Twenty20 century, the previous players being Mal Loye, Stuart Law and Brad Hodge. The innings came after Vincent was controversially dropped for the Yorkshire home game 72 hours earlier which Lancashire lost by 4 runs at Old Trafford.

Vincent followed this up with 56 from 36 balls in Lancashire's eighth Twenty20 group game against Nottinghamshire at Old Trafford. The innings included 9 fours and one six with a strike rate of 155.56. Vincent won the man of the match award for the second time in three days and helped secure Lancashire's qualification to the Quarter Finals where they were drawn to play Middlesex. Lancashire succumbed to a narrow defeat by 12 runs and were eliminated from the tournament.

Lancashire announced that Vincent was to stay on at the club as their overseas player for the remainder of the 2008 season. Brad Hodge, Lancashire's Australian designated overseas player for the 2008 season, could not return to play for Lancashire due to the ill health of his wife. Hodge had been playing in the Indian Premier League and for Australia during their tour of the West Indies and was due to return to Lancashire.

In 2010, Vincent played for Northants in the T20 competition.

In the 2011 season, Vincent represented Sussex in all forms of the game.

In 2025, he would make his return to cricket as the first recruit for Team Cricket for the annual Black Clash T20 charity match, held in Hagley Oval, Christchurch on 18 January 2025.

== International career ==
A right-handed batsman, Vincent made his Test match debut in 2001–02 when he opened the batting against Australia at the Perth. The New Zealand first innings of 534/9 declared saw four players make hundreds but no one else reach double figures. Vincent made 104. He followed this up with 54 in the second innings.

In 2005–06, Vincent hit 172 in a One Day International against Zimbabwe at Harare to set a new record for the highest individual innings for New Zealand in ODIs, beating Glenn Turner's 171 not out against East Africa in the 1975 World Cup. Vincent's innings came off just 120 balls, and included 16 fours and nine sixes.

Vincent was recalled into the New Zealand squad for the Commonwealth Bank Tri Series due to the sudden retirement of veteran Nathan Astle midway through the series. Once in Australia, he became New Zealand's most prolific run scorer, with three consecutive half centuries, contributing to three consecutive team totals of over 290.

Vincent played in the early stages of the 2007 World Cup in the Caribbean but after scoring a century and fielding well he caught a blow in the nets from Shane Bond and fractured his wrist. He was replaced in the squad by Hamish Marshall.

After being dropped from the national team due to the implementation of a rotation policy and despite his good form, Vincent suffered from Major depressive disorder and his contract with New Zealand Cricket was then later terminated with his signing for the Chandigarh Lions of the Indian Cricket League cited as the reason. Some commentators have mentioned unfair treatment of Vincent by the then New Zealand coach John Bracewell as the main cause for his departure from the national team.

== Awards ==
- Vincent has won five One Day International and one Test match Man of the Match awards.
- Vincent has won two Twenty20 Man of the Match awards while playing for Lancashire in English domestic cricket.
- Vincent won Lancashire's Player of the Month award for June 2008.

== Achievements and records ==
- Vincent equalled the most runs scored in boundaries (118 runs in boundaries) by a batsman in an ODI innings, when he scored 172 against Zimbabwe on 24 August 2005.
- Vincent became only the sixth New Zealander to make a hundred on Test debut, and only the second to achieve the feat on foreign soil.
- Vincent was chosen to represent the ICL World XI team during the 2008 ICL season.

== Ban for match fixing ==
Lou Vincent was banned from cricket for life on 1 July 2014 by the England and Wales Cricket Board for match fixing, after he admitted 18 breaches of the regulations including fixing the outcome of Sussex's match against Kent in 2011, along with Naved Arif, who received a life ban one month before him. Vincent released a statement on the day he received the life ban, admitting his involvement in match fixing. On 8 December 2023, after an appeal, his lifetime ban from domestic cricket was lifted, although it remains in place for international cricket. This allowed him to return to playing and coaching in domestic cricket.
