= December 2006 in sports =

<<	December 2006					>>
Su	Mo	Tu	We	Th	Fr	Sa
					1	2
3	4	5	6	7	8	9
10	11	12	13	14	15	16
17	18	19	20	21	22	23
24	25	26	27	28	29	30
31
Canada; Sports

This list shows notable sports-related deaths, events, and notable outcomes that occurred in December of 2006.

== Deaths ==
- 31 – Yaacov Hodorov
- 21 – Scobie Breasley
- 16 – Cecil Travis
- 15 – Clay Regazzoni
- 13 – Lamar Hunt
- 12 – Paul Arizin
- 8 – José Uribe
- 7 – Kim Hyung-chil

== Sporting seasons ==
- Auto racing 2006:
  - A1 Grand Prix
- Basketball 2006–07:
  - Euroleague
  - Philippine Basketball Association
  - Australian National Basketball League
- Cricket 2006–07:
  - Australia
  - South Africa
- Cyclo-cross: 2006/07 Cyclo-cross World Cup
- Football (soccer) 2006–07:
  - 2006–07 UEFA Champions League
  - 2006–07 UEFA Cup
  - England (general)
    - FA Premier League 2006–07
  - Scotland (general)
    - Scottish Premier League 2006–07
- Golf:
  - 2007 European Tour

- Rugby union 2006:
  - 2006–07 Heineken Cup
  - 2006–07 English Premiership
  - 2006–07 Top 14
  - 2006–07 Celtic League
  - 2007 Rugby World Cup qualifying
  - 2006–07 IRB Sevens
- Speed skating 2006–07:
  - Essent Cup 2006–07
  - World Cup
- Volleyball 2006:
  - Men's CEV Champions League 2006–07
- U.S. and Canadian sports 2006–07:
  - NCAA Division I football bowl games
  - 2006 NFL season
  - 2006–07 NHL season
  - 2006–07 NBA season

== 31 December 2006 (Sunday) ==
- American football:
  - NFL Week 17:
    - New York Jets 23, Oakland Raiders 20 – The Jets clinch a wild-card spot, while Oakland gets next year's first draft pick by virtue of having this season's worst record in the NFL (2–14).
    - Pittsburgh Steelers 23, Cincinnati Bengals 17, OT – After Cincinnati's Shayne Graham misses a 39-yard field-goal attempt at the close of regulation, Santonio Holmes takes a Ben Roethlisberger pass 67 yards to knock the Bengals out of playoff contention.
    - Kansas City Chiefs 35, Jacksonville Jaguars 30 – Larry Johnson rushes for 138 yards and three touchdowns. The win, combined with the Broncos' loss to the 49ers later that day, gives the Chiefs a playoff spot.
    - New England Patriots 40, Tennessee Titans 23 – After a Titans comeback attempt sputters, Bill Belichick allows Vinny Testaverde to throw a touchdown pass, making him the first to throw at least one in 20 straight seasons.
    - Detroit Lions 39, Dallas Cowboys 31 – The Lions' shocking victory gives the Eagles the NFC East title. Jon Kitna throws for four touchdowns, and Paris Lenon tackles Tony Romo on fourth-and-goal to preserve the win.
    - Carolina Panthers 31, New Orleans Saints 21
    - Seattle Seahawks 23, Tampa Bay Buccaneers 7
    - St. Louis Rams 41, Minnesota Vikings 21
    - Houston Texans 14, Cleveland Browns 6
    - Indianapolis Colts 27, Miami Dolphins 22 – The Colts do their part in their bid for a first-round bye, but fail when the Ravens win.
    - San Diego Chargers 27, Arizona Cardinals 20 – The Chargers secure home-field advantage throughout the AFC playoffs.
    - Baltimore Ravens 19, Buffalo Bills 7 – The Ravens' win gives them second seed in the AFC playoffs and a first-round bye.
    - San Francisco 49ers 26, Denver Broncos 23 (OT) – The Broncos, needing only a tie to secure a wild-card berth, blow an early 13–0 lead, fail to score on three trips inside the Niners 5 in regulation, and eventually lose the game and a playoff berth on a Joe Nedney field goal.
    - Philadelphia Eagles 24, Atlanta Falcons 17
    - Green Bay Packers 26, Chicago Bears 7 – In what many analysts speculate will be Brett Favre's last game, he throws for 285 yards and a TD to help lead the Pack to a rout of the Bears, who had little to play for as they had already clinched home field throughout the NFC playoffs. Bears QB Rex Grossman goes 2-for-12 with three interceptions, two returned for TDs, in the first half, and is pulled in favor of Brian Griese.
  - College football: MPC Computers Bowl – Miami (Florida) 21, Nevada 20

== 30 December 2006 (Saturday) ==
- American football:
  - NFL Week 17: New York Giants 34, Washington Redskins 28: In what he says will be his last regular-season game, Tiki Barber rushes for a team-record 234 yards and scores three touchdowns. The Giants clinch the last playoff spot in the NFC.
  - College football:
    - Meineke Car Care Bowl: (23) Boston College 25, Navy 24 – After a Navy fumble, BC's Steve Aponavicius kicks a 37-yard field goal as time expires.
    - Alamo Bowl: (18) Texas 26, Iowa 24 – Colt McCoy throws for 308 yards and leads the Longhorns back from a 14–0 deficit.
    - Chick-fil-A Bowl: Georgia 31, (14) Virginia Tech 24 – The Bulldogs score 28 unanswered second-half points.
- Golf: Tiger Woods and his wife Elin announce that they are expecting their first child in the summer of 2007. He will skip the first three official events of the 2007 PGA Tour season to spend time with her. (ESPN)
- Ski jumping: 16-year-old Gregor Schlierenzauer wins the first of four competitions in the 2006–07 Four Hills Tournament. The Austrian came 1.5 metres short to break the hill record in his third World Cup win in only five career appearances.

== 29 December 2006 (Friday) ==
- American college football:
  - Gaylord Hotels Music City Bowl presented by Bridgestone – Kentucky 28, Clemson 20. The Wildcats win a bowl for the first time since 1984.
  - Brut Sun Bowl – Oregon State 39, Missouri 38. The Beavers win on a gamble, cashing in on a two-point conversion attempt with 22 seconds left.
  - AutoZone Liberty Bowl – South Carolina 44, Houston 36
  - Insight Bowl – Texas Tech 44, Minnesota 41 (OT). The Red Raiders spot the Golden Gophers a 38–7 lead midway through the third quarter, and then go on the biggest comeback in Division I-A postseason history to win in overtime.
  - Champs Sports Bowl – Maryland 24, Purdue 7

== 28 December 2006 (Thursday) ==
- 2006–07 Ashes series, Fourth Test, day 3: Australia vs. England, in Melbourne.
  - England second innings: 161 all out (65.5 overs). Australia win the match by an innings and 99 runs, stretching their lead in the five-match series to 4–0. Shane Warne, in his final Test at the MCG, is named Man of the Match for his bowling figures of 5–39 and 2–46, and his 40 not out with the bat in the first innings. His final dismissal, of Steve Harmison, puts him on 999 total Test and ODI wickets, trailing only Muttiah Muralitharan. (BBC)
- American college football:
  - Independence Bowl – Oklahoma State 34, Alabama 31
  - Texas Bowl – Rutgers 37, Kansas State 10. The Scarlet Knights win a bowl game for the first time in their history.
  - Holiday Bowl – California 45, Texas A&M 10

== 27 December 2006 (Wednesday) ==
- American college football:
  - Emerald Bowl – Florida State 44, UCLA 27

== 26 December 2006 (Tuesday) ==
- 2006–07 Ashes series:
  - Shane Warne becomes the first cricketer to take 700 test wickets.
- American college football:
  - Motor City Bowl – Central Michigan 31, Middle Tennessee 14

== 25 December 2006 (Monday) ==
- Basketball: NBA Christmas Game: Miami Heat 101, Los Angeles Lakers 85. Dwyane Wade scores 40 as the defending NBA Champions breeze to victory.
- NFL Christmas Day Games:
  - Philadelphia Eagles 23, Dallas Cowboys 7. The Eagles victory clinches a playoff spot, and puts them atop the NFC East.
  - Monday Night Football: New York Jets 13, Miami Dolphins 10. Mike Nugent's 30-yard field goal with ten seconds left in regulation allows the Jets to control their destiny in the AFC.

== 24 December 2006 (Sunday) ==
- American football (all times US EST/-5 UTC):
  - NFL Week 16 Sunday Games:
    - Baltimore Ravens 31, Pittsburgh Steelers 7. The Ravens take a 1-game lead over the Colts for the number-two spot in the AFC, thus rendering the Steelers unable to repeat as Super Bowl champions.
    - Carolina Panthers 10, Atlanta Falcons 3. The Panthers stay alive in the chase for a wild-card spot.
    - Chicago Bears 26, Detroit Lions 21. In a planned move, Brian Griese replaces Rex Grossman in the fourth quarter, and leads the Bears to two fourth-quarter drives ending with Robbie Gould field goals for the win.
    - Houston Texans 27, Indianapolis Colts 24. Kris Brown's game-winning 48-yard field goal drops the Colts into third place in the AFC.
    - New England Patriots 27, Jacksonville Jaguars 24. The Patriots clinch the game, and the AFC East title, when Jarvis Green strips David Garrard of the ball with 1:55 left.
    - New Orleans Saints 31, New York Giants 7. Both Reggie Bush and Deuce McAllister rush for more than 100 yards, while the Giants do not run a play in Saints territory all game.
    - Tampa Bay Buccaneers 22, Cleveland Browns 7. The Buccaneers win their first road game in over a year as they trounce the equally pathetic Browns.
    - Tennessee Titans 30, Buffalo Bills 29. The Titans win their sixth straight and stay alive in the playoff hunt, while the Bills are eliminated.
    - St. Louis Rams 37, Washington Redskins 31 (OT). The Rams join the logjam at 7–8 in the NFC after Steven Jackson's game-ending 21-yard touchdown.
    - Arizona Cardinals 26, San Francisco 49ers 20. The 49ers' loss eliminates themselves from playoff contention, and clinches the NFC West for Seattle.
    - Denver Broncos 24, Cincinnati Bengals 23. The Broncos move a step close to a wild-card spot when the Bengals botch an extra-point attempt with 37 seconds remaining.
    - San Diego Chargers 20, Seattle Seahawks 17. The Chargers win on a 37-yard touchdown pass from Philip Rivers to Vincent Jackson with 27 seconds left
  - College football:
    - Sheraton Hawaiʻi Bowl – Hawaiʻi 42, Arizona State 24. Warriors QB Colt Brennan sets a new NCAA record for most touchdown passes thrown in a season with 58, including five in this game.

== 23 December 2006 (Saturday) ==
- American football (All times US EST/-5 UTC):
  - College football:
    - Papajohns.com Bowl – South Florida 24, East Carolina 7.
    - New Mexico Bowl – San Jose State 20, New Mexico 12.
    - Bell Helicopters Armed Forces Bowl – Utah 25, Tulsa 13.
  - NFL Week 16 Saturday game: Kansas City Chiefs 20, Oakland Raiders 9. Larry Johnson rushes for 132 yards as the Chiefs kept their faint wild card hopes alive.
- College basketball:
  - Bob Knight ties Dean Smith's NCAA Division I record for most wins with his 879th win as Texas Tech defeats Bucknell, 72–60.
  - In what many called a prelude to the Final Four in December, Florida defeats Ohio State in Gainesville, 86–60.

== 22 December 2006 (Friday) ==
- NBA:
  - The Washington Wizards, thanks to Gilbert Arenas' 54 points, snapped the Phoenix Suns' 15-game winning streak, defeating the hosts 144–139 in overtime.
  - Allen Iverson made his debut with the Denver Nuggets, not starting the game but entering with less than four minutes in the first quarter, contributing 22 points and 10 assists, but the Sacramento Kings spoiled his party, winning 101–96.
- American college football: R+L New Orleans Bowl – Troy 41, Rice 17.

== 21 December 2006 (Thursday) ==
- American football (all times EST/-5 UTC):
  - NFL Week 16 Thursday Night Game: Green Bay Packers 9, Minnesota Vikings 7. In a game that saw neither team score an offensive touchdown, Brett Favre, in what could be his last home game, rallies the Packers to a game-winning field goal by Dave Rayner with 1:34 left.
  - College football: Pioneer Pure Vision Las Vegas Bowl, BYU 38, Oregon 8
- Cricket: Australian cricketing legend Shane Warne announces his retirement from international and domestic cricket after the end of the current Test series against England.
- Basketball: Euroleague
  - Panathinaikos of Athens becomes the first club to secure a berth in the Top 16 phase with a 78–75 away win over Cibona of Zagreb. (Euroleague)
  - Later that evening, an 89–67 win by Pau-Orthez (France) over Fenerbahçe Ülker (Turkey) secures a Top 16 berth for defending Euroleague champion CSKA Moscow. (Euroleague)

== 20 December 2006 (Wednesday) ==
- NHL: The Pennsylvania Gaming Control Board unanimously rejects a bid by Isle of Capri Casinos for a slot machine-casino license in Pittsburgh. Isle of Capri had committed to building the Pittsburgh Penguins a $290 million (US$) arena if they had received the license. The vote leaves the Penguins' future in Pittsburgh in serious doubt. (ESPN)

== 19 December 2006 (Tuesday) ==
- NBA: The Philadelphia 76ers end the Allen Iverson era, trading the All-Star guard to the Denver Nuggets. The Sixers get in return point guard Andre Miller, forward Joe Smith and the Nuggets' two first round draft choices in the 2007 NBA draft. (NBA.com)
- American college football:
  - San Diego County Credit Union Poinsettia Bowl – TCU 37, Northern Illinois 7.
- Football (soccer): Carling Cup
  - Charlton Athletic 0–1 Wycombe Wanderers
    - The League Two team shocks the Premiership squad in The Valley, and will meet another Premier League squad in the two-legged semi-finals.

== 18 December 2006 (Monday) ==
- Athletics: India's Santhi Soundarajan fails a gender test taken during the 2006 Asian Games and was stripped of her silver medal in the women's 800 meters. (BBC)
- Cricket
  - England in Australia, 2006–07 Ashes series, Third Test, day 5: Australia vs. England, in Perth, Western Australia.
    - England second innings: 350 all out (122.2 overs) Australia wins the match by 206 runs, and regain the Ashes at the earliest possible opportunity, leading the five-match series by 3–0. (BBC), (BBC Scorecard)
  - India v. South Africa, First Test at Johannesburg:
    - India wins its first-ever Test in South Africa, defeating South Africa by 123 runs. Shanthakumaran Sreesanth is named Player of the Match for his bowling effort (5/40 and 3/59). India leads the three-Test series 1–0. (Scorecard)
  - New Zealand v. Sri Lanka, Second Test at Wellington:
    - Sri Lanka defeats New Zealand by 217 runs to draw the two-Test series 1–1. Sri Lanka's Chamara Silva (61 and 152 not out) is named Player of the Match. Other top performers included Kumar Sangakkara (156 not out in the First Innings), Lasith Malinga (5/68 and 2/62), Muttiah Muralitharan (4/31 and 6/87) and Daniel Vettori (3/53 and 7/130). (Scorecard)
- American football:
  - NFL: Terrell Owens is fined $35,000 (US$) for spitting in Atlanta Falcons defensive back DeAngelo Hall's face during the Dallas Cowboys' 38–28 win over the Falcons on Saturday. (NFL.com)
  - Monday Night Football: Indianapolis Colts 34, Cincinnati Bengals 17. Marvin Harrison catches three of Peyton Manning's four touchdown passes, and allows the Baltimore Ravens to clinch the AFC North with the Bengals' loss.
- NBA: In the aftermath of the brawl involving the Denver Nuggets and New York Knicks on Saturday, the Nuggets' Carmelo Anthony gets a 15-game suspension without pay from commissioner David Stern. In addition, J.R. Smith (Denver) and Nate Robertson (New York) were each given 10-game suspensions, Mardy Collins (NYK) received a six-game suspension, Jared Jeffries (NYK) will sit out four games, and Nenê (DEN) and Jerome James (NYK) each will miss one game for coming off the bench during the fracas. Additionally, both teams were fined $500,000 (US). (NBA.com)

== 17 December 2006 (Sunday) ==
- NBA: In the second highest scoring game this season, Gilbert Arenas sets a franchise record of 60 points as the Washington Wizards defeated the Los Angeles Lakers in overtime, 147–141. The previous record was set by Earl Monroe, when the team was known as the Baltimore Bullets on 13 February 1968 with 56 points against the Lakers, in overtime. Kobe Bryant scored 48 points for the Lakers in the loss to Washington.
- Cricket – England in Australia
  - 2006–07 Ashes series, Third Test, day 4: Australia vs. England, in Perth, Western Australia.
    - England second innings: 265 for 5 (96.0 overs) Australia still have the advantage, but England held them off all day, however losing two wickets in the last few overs. (BBC), (BBC Scorecard)
- Football (soccer):
  - 2006 FIFA Club World Cup final:
    - Internacional 1–0 Barcelona
  - Third-place game:
    - América 1–2 Al Ahly
- American football: NFL Week 15 Sunday Games:
  - Baltimore Ravens 27, Cleveland Browns 17. The Ravens clinch a playoff spot.
  - Green Bay Packers 17, Detroit Lions 9. Brett Favre passes Dan Marino for the most completions in NFL history in the Packers' win.
  - New England Patriots 40, Houston Texans 7. The Pats' rout of the Texans keeps them in the front of the AFC East.
  - Tennessee Titans 24, Jacksonville Jaguars 17. The Titans gain only 98 yards and hold the ball for barely 15 minutes but return two interceptions and a fumble for touchdowns.
  - Buffalo Bills 21, Miami Dolphins 0. For the second straight week, the Bills beat a divisional rival, and in the process, eliminate the Dolphins from post-season contention with the season sweep.
  - New York Jets 26, Minnesota Vikings 13. Chad Pennington threw for 339 yards in the Jets' win.
  - Pittsburgh Steelers 37, Carolina Panthers 3. Willie Parker has 132 rushing yards in the Steelers' blowout win.
  - Chicago Bears 34, Tampa Bay Buccaneers 31 (OT). Despite blowing a 21-point lead, the Bears clinch the number-one seed in the NFC playoffs thanks to Robbie Gould's 25-yard field goal with 3:37 left in the extra period.
  - Washington Redskins 16, New Orleans Saints 10. In spite of the loss, the Saints clinch the NFC South title with losses by Atlanta and Carolina.
  - Denver Broncos 35, Arizona Cardinals 13. Jay Cutler throws for two touchdowns in his first NFL win.
  - Philadelphia Eagles 36, New York Giants 22. Trent Cole, whose personal foul cost the Eagles their Week Two loss to the Giants, seals the game with an interception return for a touchdown as they take sole possession of second place in the NFC East.
  - St. Louis Rams 20, Oakland Raiders 0. The Raiders are shut out for the third time this season as they commit five turnovers and Steven Jackson capitalizes for two rushing touchdowns.
  - San Diego Chargers 20, Kansas City Chiefs 9. LaDainian Tomlinson rushes for 199 yards and scores two touchdowns to set the NFL's single season scoring record previously held by Paul Hornung of the Green Bay Packers in 1960. His second rushing touchdown broke the record for most rushing touchdowns in a season shared by Priest Holmes (set in 2003) and Shaun Alexander (last season) and the record for consecutive multiple touchdown games (eight, breaking John Riggins' mark set in 1983).

== 16 December 2006 (Saturday) ==
- NBA: Ten players – including league scoring leader Carmelo Anthony – are ejected in a game between the New York Knicks and the Denver Nuggets due to brawling, the worst since the Pacers–Pistons brawl on 19 November 2004 in Auburn Hills, Michigan. The Nuggets won the game, 123–100.
- Cricket – England in Australia
  - 2006–07 Ashes series, Third Test, day 3: Australia vs. England, in Perth, Western Australia.
    - Australia second innings: 527 for 5 (declared, 112.0 overs)
    - England second innings: 19 for 1 (6.0 overs) Australia lead by 537 runs. England will need a record score (or unexpected bad weather) to save the series. (BBC), (BBC Scorecard)
- Football (American): NFL Week 15 Saturday Game: Dallas Cowboys 38, Atlanta Falcons 28. The Cowboys win on two second-half touchdowns from running back Marion Barber. Falcons kicker Morten Andersen passes Gary Anderson as the NFL's all-time scoring leader with his second extra point, while Michael Vick breaks Bobby Douglass' 34-year-old record for yards rushing by a quarterback in a season, reaching 990 by game end.
- Cycling: Theo Bos sets a new world record at the 200 metres sprint distance in track cycling. His time of 9.722 seconds was 0.120 faster than Canadian Curt Harnett cycled in 1995. Harnett's record was set in Bogotá, Colombia at a high-altitude track, while Bos' record was set on a low-altitude track in Moscow during a 2007 UCI Track Cycling World Cup Classics meeting.

== 15 December 2006 (Friday) ==
- Cricket – England in Australia
  - 2006–07 Ashes series, Third Test, day 2: Australia vs. England, in Perth, Western Australia.
    - England first innings: 215 all out (64.1 overs)
    - Australia second innings: 119 for 1 (36.0 overs) Australia lead by 148 runs. (BBC), (BBC Scorecard)
- Golf
  - 2006 Lexus Cup – Asia and the International teams are tied 3–3 after day one.

== 14 December 2006 (Thursday) ==
- Alpine skiing: Only one day after Andreas Schifferer announced his retirement from international skiing competitions his fellow countryman Werner Franz does the same. Franz who faced many longterm injuries won one European Cup and two World Cup meetings during his career.
- Cricket – England in Australia
  - 2006–07 Ashes series, Third Test, day 1: Australia vs. England, in Perth, Western Australia.
    - Australia leads the series, 2–0. England must at least draw this test to keep the Ashes from returning to Australia. Australia won the toss and decided to bat first.
    - Australia first innings: 244 all out (71.0 overs). Monty Panesar took 5 Australian wickets for 92 runs off 24 overs.
    - England first innings: 51 for 2 (14.0 overs). (BBC), Scoreboard (BBC)
- Football (soccer):
  - 2006–07 UEFA Cup, Matchday 5: (Teams who are qualified for the Round of 32 after Matchday 5 are in **bold**, teams that have already qualified before Matchday 5 are in italics.)
    - Group A Rangers 1–0 Partizan Belgrade (Rangers are winners of Group A)
    - Group A AJ Auxerre 0–1 **Livorno**
    - Group B Tottenham Hotspur 3–1 Dinamo Bucharest (Tottenham Hotspur are winners of Group B)
    - Group B **Bayer Leverkusen** 2–1 Beşiktaş
    - Group C **Braga** 2–0 Grasshoppers
    - Group C Sevilla 1–2 AZ Alkmaar (AZ Alkmaar are winners of Group C)
    - Group D Parma 0–3 **Osasuna** (Parma are winners of Group D)
    - Group D Heerenveen 1–0 **Lens**
  - 2006 FIFA Club World Cup semi-final:
    - América 0–4 Barcelona
      - The Catalan squad, defending UEFA Champions League holders, easily advanced to the final on Sunday. Goal scorers are Eiður Guðjohnsen, Rafael Márquez, Ronaldinho and Deco.
- Football (American): NFL Week 15 Thursday Game
  - San Francisco 49ers 24, Seattle Seahawks 14. After going almost the entire first half without a third down conversion, the 49ers spoil the Seahawks' second bid to clinch the NFC West and sweep the season series. Alex Smith throws for two touchdowns, and ran for a third in the win.
- Snooker: 2006 UK Snooker Championship:
  - Ronnie O'Sullivan surprises opponent Stephen Hendry, the audience, referees and many others watching the live broadcasting of his match as he concedes the match at a 4–1 score. Henry was awarded the remaining frames and won the match by 9–1. Only several hours later O'Sullivan gave the reason for his decision. He said "Today I got so annoyed with myself that I lost my patience and walked away from a game that, with hindsight, I should have continued."

== 13 December 2006 (Wednesday) ==
- Major League Baseball: The Boston Red Sox and former Seibu Lions pitcher Daisuke Matsuzaka agree in principle on a six-year, $52 million (US$) contract. (AP via Yahoo)
- NFL Football:
  - Kansas City Chiefs owner Lamar Hunt dies due to complications from prostate cancer in Dallas, Texas, at the age of 74. While best known for founding the American Football League and naming the Super Bowl, Hunt was also heavily involved in professional soccer as a founder of the North American Soccer League and Major League Soccer, basketball with a minority ownership of the Chicago Bulls and tennis, bringing about the creation of the Open Tennis era with the creation of World Championship Tennis. (Fox Sports)
- Alpine skiing: Downhill specialist Andreas Schifferer ends his career. During his career Schifferer won eight Alpine skiing World Cup meetings and the 1997–98 overall downhill World Cup. He also won a bronze medal at the 1997 World Championships (Giant slalom) and the 2002 Winter Olympics (Super G).
- Football:
  - 2006–07 UEFA Cup, Matchday 5: (Teams who are qualified for the Round of 32 after Matchday 5 are in **bold**, teams that have already qualified before Matchday 5 are in italics.)
    - Group E Blackburn Rovers 1–0 **Nancy** (Blackburn Rovers are winners of Group E)
    - Group E **Feyenoord** 3–1 Wisła Kraków
    - Group F Espanyol 1–0 Austria Vienna (Espanyol are winners of Group F)
    - Group F Zulte-Waregem 0–3 **Ajax**
    - Group G **Paris Saint-Germain** 4–0 Panathinaikos (Panathinaikos are winners of Group G)
    - Group G **Hapoel Tel Aviv** 1–1 Mladá Boleslav
    - Group H Palermo 1–1 **Celta Vigo**
    - Group H **Fenerbahçe** 2–2 Eintracht Frankfurt
  - FIFA Club World Cup 2006: Semi final
    - Al Ahly 1–2 Sport Club Internacional
      - Alexandre Pato gave the Brazilian team an early lead, but Flávio Amado equalised after 54 minutes. Luiz Adriano's goal 18 minutes before time was the final clinching goal.
- Golf: Tiger Woods wins the Jack Nicklaus Trophy for the eighth time after being chosen by his fellow golfers. Trevor Immelman became rookie of the year, while Steve Stricker made the comeback of the year.
- Tennis: Former World #1 Lindsay Davenport, winner of three Grand Slam events and 51 tournaments in all, announces that she and husband Jon Leach are expecting their first child in May 2007. Although she did not officially retire, she strongly hinted that she would not play again. (ESPN)

== 12 December 2006 (Tuesday) ==
- Football (soccer):
  - The Brazilian Football Confederation (CBF) officially announces their interest in hosting the FIFA World Cup 2014. President Ricardo Teixeira said Brazil will host the World Cup for the first time in 64 years. FIFA members already announced that the World Cup will be most likely held in South America. All other CONMEBOL members support Brazil in hosting the event.

== 11 December 2006 (Monday) ==
- NFL Monday Night Football: Chicago Bears 42, St. Louis Rams 27.
  - Bears return specialist Devin Hester sets a new NFL single-season record with his fifth (94 yards on a kickoff in the first quarter) and sixth (96 yards on a fourth quarter kickoff) kick returns for a touchdown. The two kickoff returns for touchdowns tie the NFL single-game record for the sixth time, last done by Chad Morton with the New York Jets against the Buffalo Bills on 8 September 2002. (NFL.com)
- NBA: Commissioner David Stern announces that the league's widely criticized new microfiber composite ball will be replaced by the league's old leather ball, effective 1 January 2007. (ESPN)
- Football (soccer):
  - FIFA Club World Cup 2006:
    - Club América 1–0 Jeonbuk Hyundai Motors 1–0
      - Ricardo Francisco Rojas was the only goalscorer and América will now face Barcelona in the semi-finals.
  - General news: West Ham United fires manager Alan Pardew due to weak performances in the league. Last weekend "The Hammers" were beaten 4–0 by Bolton Wanderers and dropped down to the 18th position.
- Tennis: Jan Siemerink is appointed as the new manager of the Dutch Davis Cup Team to replace Tjerk Bogtstra.

== 10 December 2006 (Sunday) ==
- American football: NFL Week 14 Sunday Games:
  - Cincinnati Bengals 27, Oakland Raiders 10. Carson Palmer's two touchdowns outweigh his three interceptions as the Raiders offense fails to capitalize.
  - Minnesota Vikings 30, Detroit Lions 20. Artose Pinner ran roughshod on the Lions' nonexistent defense for 125 yards and three touchdowns.
  - Baltimore Ravens 20, Kansas City Chiefs 10. Trent Green throws two costly interceptions to Ed Reed that sink the Chiefs.
  - Miami Dolphins 21, New England Patriots 0. The Dolphins surprise Tom Brady, holding him to 78 passing yards.
  - Atlanta Falcons 17, Tampa Bay Buccaneers 6. Demorrio Williams' 54-yard return of a Bucs fumble and Justin Griffith's 21-yard run for touchdowns provided the cushion needed for the Falcons.
  - Philadelphia Eagles 21, Washington Redskins 19. Jeff Garcia throws two touchdowns, then the Eagles manage to hold off the surging Redskins, burning time successfully on their final drive.
  - New York Giants 27, Carolina Panthers 13. Eli Manning throws for three touchdowns. Chris Weinke, in his first start in four years due to Jake Delhomme's thumb injury, threw for 423 yards, but was intercepted three times.
  - Jacksonville Jaguars 44, Indianapolis Colts 17. Maurice Jones-Drew (166 yards rushing) and Fred Taylor (131 yards) expose the Colts' utter inability to defend the run. Jones-Drew has two rushing TDs and returns a punt for a third. The Jaguars' 375 rushing yards are a team single-game record, with the previous record of 246 being broken before halftime, while a third Jag, Alvin Pearman (77 yards), joined Jones-Drew and Taylor outrushing the whole Colts team (34 yards total).
  - Tennessee Titans 26, Houston Texans 20 (OT). Vince Young's 39-yard touchdown run in overtime give Tennessee its fourth straight win.
  - Arizona Cardinals 27, Seattle Seahawks 21. Thanks to three Seahawks fumbles resulting in 14 Cardinal points, the visitors failed to clinch the NFC West title.
  - Green Bay Packers 30, San Francisco 49ers 19. On the site of his many triumphs, Brett Favre threw for 298 yards in the Pack's win.
  - Buffalo Bills 31, New York Jets 13. Willis McGahee's 57-yard run, J. P. Losman's 77-yard pass to Lee Evans and Nate Clements' 58-yard return of a Chad Pennington interception, all for touchdowns, stunned the Jets at The Meadowlands.
  - San Diego Chargers 48, Denver Broncos 20. LaDainian Tomlinson's third rushing touchdown, his 29th of the year, breaks Shaun Alexander's year-old record for TDs in a season as the Chargers clinch the AFC West.
  - New Orleans Saints 42, Dallas Cowboys 17. Drew Brees threw for five touchdowns, an all-time Cowboys worst in the Saints' rout.
- Athletics: 2006 European Cross Country Championships:
  - men: (gold) (United Kingdom) Mo Farah, (silver) (Spain) Juan Carlos de la Ossa, (bronze) (Sweden) Mustafa Mohamed (second placed Fernando Silva from Portugal was disqualified because of doping with erythropoietin)
  - women: (gold) (Ukraine) Tetyana Holovchenko, (silver) (Russia) Mariya Konovalova, (bronze) (Serbia) Olivera Jevtić
- Auto racing: 2006–07 A1 Grand Prix of Nations, Indonesia:
  - sprint race: (1) (New Zealand) Jonny Reid, (2) (Mexico) Salvador Duran, (3) (United Kingdom) Robbie Kerr
  - main race: (1) (New Zealand) Jonny Reid, (2) (Germany) Nico Hülkenberg, (3) (France) Nicolas Lapierre
- Billiards: 2006 Mosconi Cup:
  - Team America wins six out of nine matches over the last two session versus Team Europe to overcome their trailing score of 9–6 to a 12–12 final standings. This draw means Team America, who were the 2005 Mosconi Cup winners will keep the cup for another year.
- Football (soccer):
  - FIFA Club World Cup 2006:
    - Al Ahly 2–0 Auckland City FC
      - The Egyptian team claims their place in the semi-finals where they will meet Sport Club Internacional, and was too strong for the New Zealand side. The goals were scored by Flávio Amado and Mohamed Aboutreika.
- Mexico: Chivas de Guadalajara defeat Club Toluca in Toluca's home stadium Estadio Nemesio Díez, winning the game 2–1 (3–2 aggrate) and becoming the champions in the Mexico Apertura (opening tournament).
- Golf:
  - 2007 European Tour: Alfred Dunhill Championship:
    - (1) (Spain) Álvaro Quirós (13 under), (2) (South Africa) Charl Schwartzel (12 under), (3) (England) Lee Westwood (9 under). It was Quiros' first European Tour win in his career.
  - 2006 WGC – Barbados World Cup:
    - Team Germany, consisting of Bernhard Langer and Marcel Siem defeat the Scottish team of Colin Montgomerie and Marc Warren in the play-offs to claim the title. Swedes Carl Pettersson and Henrik Stenson also participated in the play-offs but only finished in third position.
- Sailing: 2006 Tornado World Championship:
  - (gold) (Australia) Darren Bundock / Glenn Ashby, (silver) (Argentina) Santiago Lange / Carlos Espinola, (bronze) (Austria) Roman Hagara / Hans Peter Steinacher
- Swimming: European Short Course Swimming Championships 2006:
  - Stefan Nystrand, Petter Stymne, Marcus Piehl and Jonas Tilly of Sweden swim a new World record on the 4x50m freestyle relay in 1:24.89, swimming 0.14 faster than The Netherlands did in 2005.
  - Alena Popchanka sets a new European record as her time of 1:54.25 is 0.28 faster than the previous record held by British Melanie Marshall.
  - Antje Buschschulte loses her European record at the 200m backstroke to French Esther Baron who finishes 0.15 seconds before the previous record in a new time of 2:04.08 to claim the gold.

== 9 December 2006 (Saturday) ==
- American College football: The 2006 Heisman Trophy is won by Ohio State quarterback Troy Smith in the second biggest margin of victory in the award's history, topped by O. J. Simpson's margin of victory in 1968. The win gives The Ohio State University their seventh Heisman winner, tying Southern California and Notre Dame for the most trophies won by a single school. (Washington Post)
- Cricket – Sri Lanka v. New Zealand:
  - First Test in Christchurch: New Zealand defeats Sri Lanka by five wickets. A low-scoring match: only one century (Kumar Sangakkara 100 not out) and one half-century (Daniel Vettori 63) were scored during the three days of play. Shane Bond wins the Player of the Match award for his bowling effort (3/43 and 4/63). (Scorecard)
- Cyclo-cross: 2006 UCI Cyclo-cross European Championships:
  - Men: (gold) (Netherlands) Gerben de Knegt, (silver) (Belgium) Bert Arnouts, (bronze) (Netherlands) Wilant van Gils
  - Women: (gold) (Netherlands) Daphny van den Brand, (silver) (Germany) Hanka Kupfernagel, (bronze) (Netherlands) Marianne Vos
- Rugby union: 2006 South Africa Sevens, final:
  - New Zealand 24–17 South Africa
- Swimming: European Short Course Swimming Championships 2006:
  - Yury Prilukov trashes his own European record at the 1500m freestyle by more than seven seconds, bringing the time down from 14:23.92 to 14:16.13 in Helsinki. Prilukov's record is now six seconds away from the 14:10.10 World record set by Grant Hackett.
  - Laure Manaudou swims a new World record at the 400m freestyle. The old record, which was also hers was swum in 3:56.79, while 3:56.09 is the new best time.

== 8 December 2006 (Friday) ==
- Baseball: Former San Francisco Giants shortstop José Uribe, 47, is killed in an automobile accident approximately 30 miles west of Santo Domingo, Dominican Republic.
- Football (American): West Virginia University head coach Rich Rodriguez announces that he has agreed to a new contract with the university, despite rumors he had accepted the job as head coach of the University of Alabama.

== 7 December 2006 (Thursday) ==
- Baseball: MLB.com reports that the San Francisco Giants and Barry Bonds have agreed on a one-year, $16 million (US$) contract.
- Football (American):
  - NFL Week 14 Thursday night game: Pittsburgh Steelers 27, Cleveland Browns 7. Willie Parker broke the Steelers' all-time record for most yards rushing in a game by a running back with 223 yards on 32 carries. By comparison, the Browns had a total of 18 yards on 11 carries as a team.
- NBA: In a game that tied for the fourth-highest combined scoring game in league history, the Phoenix Suns defeated the New Jersey Nets in double overtime, 161–157. Steve Nash led all scorers with 42 points for the Suns, while the Nets' Jason Kidd had his 89th triple double (38 points, 14 assists and 14 rebounds) in a losing effort, tying him with Wilt Chamberlain for third place on the all-time list.
- Asian Games:
  - Tragedy struck the Asian Games when South Korean equestrian athlete Kim Hyung-chil died after falling off his horse during the cross country competition which took place in the rain. The accident occurred at jump number eight during the cross-country stage of the three-day eventing competition. After the horse rolled over him, he was taken to the hospital, with his death later confirmed by the organizing committee. Kim won a silver medal at the 2002 Asian Games in Busan on the same horse.
- Football (soccer):
  - The UEFA gives Feyenoord Rotterdam a fine of €125,000, because of the crowd trouble that occurred during their match versus AS Nancy on 30 November. Feyenoord also has to pay to repair the Stade Marcel Picot and will play two home matches without any supporters if something similar happens within the next three years.
- Swimming: European Short Course Swimming Championships 2006:
  - The German relay team, Helge Meeuw, Johannes Neumann, Thomas Rupprath and Jens Schreiber beats the World Record at the 4x50m Medley relay. The time of 1:34.06 was 0.40 faster than the old record, which was also swum by a German team.
  - Arkady Vyatchanin swims a new European record at the 200m backstroke. The Russian became the first European to swim under 1:50.00, finishing 0.02 underneath the time. The previous European record was 1:50.43 held by Markus Rogan.
  - Otylia Jędrzejczak beats Annika Mehlhorn's European record of 2:05.77 to 2:04.94, becoming the first European to swim under 2:05.00 at the 200m butterfly. Mehlhorn herself only finished in fifth position.

== 6 December 2006 (Wednesday) ==
- American football: Ohio State quarterback Troy Smith, Notre Dame quarterback Brady Quinn and Arkansas running back Darren McFadden have been named the three finalists for the 2006 Heisman Trophy. (Bloomberg)
- Football:
  - 2006–07 UEFA Champions League Matchday 6 (Teams advancing in **Boldface**; teams progressing to the UEFA Cup in italics):
    - Group E: Dynamo Kyiv 2–2 **Real Madrid**
    - Group E: **Lyon** 1–1 Steaua Bucharest
    - Group F: København 3–1 **Celtic**
    - Group F: **Manchester United** 3–1 Benfica
    - Group G: Hamburg 3–2 CSKA Moscow
    - Group G: **Porto** 0–0 **Arsenal**
    - Group H: **A.C. Milan** 0–2 **Lille**
    - Group H: Anderlecht 2–2 AEK Athens (UEFA.com)

== 5 December 2006 (Tuesday) ==
- Asian Games
  - Badminton
    - Men's Team Final: (gold) China 3–2 (silver) South Korea
    - Women's Team Final: (gold) China 3–0 (silver) Japan
  - Cue Sports
    - Men's Snooker (Team): India, China, Hong Kong, and Malaysia advance to the medal round.
    - Men's English Billiards (singles): (gold) Pankaj Arjan Advani (India) ; (silver) Ashok Harishankar Shandil Ya (India) ; (bronze) Peter Gilchrist (Singapore)
    - Men's Snooker (Doubles): (gold) Ding Junhui and Tian Pengfei (China) ; (silver) Marco Fu Ka Chun and Chan Wai Ki (Hong Kong) ; (bronze) Phaithoon Phonbun and Atthasit Mahitthi (Thailand)
  - Cycling
    - Men's Road Time Trial: (gold) Song Baoqing (China) ; (silver) Evgeny Vakker (Kyrgyzstan) ; (bronze) Andrey Mizurov (Kazakhstan)
    - Women's Road Time Trial: Li Meifang (China) ; (silver) Zulfiya Zabirova (Kazakhstan) ; (bronze) Lee Min Hye (South Korea)
  - Equestrian
    - Dressage (Indiv.): (gold) Choi Jun Sang on Dancing Boy II (South Korea) ; (silver) Yukiko Noge on Lanchester Kouko (Japan) ; (bronze) Mohd Qabil Mahamad Fathil on Charming 8 (Malaysia)
  - Football
    - Men's: Thailand, Uzbekistan, and South Korea advance to the quarterfinals.
  - Gymnastics
    - Men's Floor: (gold) Zou Kai (China) ; (silver) Liang Fuliang (China) ; (bronze) Kim Soo Myun (South Korea)
    - Men's Pommel Horse: (gold) Hiroyuki Tomita (Japan) , Kim Soo Myun (South Korea) , Jo Jong Chol (North Korea)
    - Men's Rings: (gold) Chen Yibing (China) , Yang Wei (China) ; (bronze) Timur Kurbanbayev (Kazakhstan)
    - Women's Vault: (gold) Cheng Fei (China) ; (silver) Hong Su Jong (North Korea) ; (bronze) Hong Un Jong (North Korea)
    - Women's Uneven Bars: (gold) Hong Su Jong (North Korea) ; (silver) He Ning (China) ; (bronze) Cha Yong Hwa (North Korea)
  - Handball
    - Men's: Bahrain, Qatar, Iran and Japan advance to the quarterfinals.
  - Judo
    - Men's 60 kg.: (gold) Tatsuaki Egusa (Japan) ; (silver) Cho Nam Suk (South Korea) ; (bronze) Masoud Haji Akhondzadeh (Iran) , Salamat Utarbayev (Kazakhstan)
    - Men's Open: (gold) Kim Sung Bum (South Korea) ; (silver) Seyed Mahmoudreza Miran Fashandi (Iran) ; (bronze) Yohei Takai (Japan) , Askhat Zhitkeyev (Kazakhstan)
    - Women's 48 kg: (gold) Gao Feng (China) ; (silver) Kim Young Ran (South Korea) ; (bronze) Misato Nakamura (Japan) , Kelbet Nurgazina (Kazakhstan)
    - Women's Open: (gold) Liu Huanyuan (China) ; (silver) Tserenkhand Dorjgotov (Mongolia) ; (bronze) Mai Tateyama (Japan) , Gulzhan Issanova (Kazakhstan)
  - Kabaddi
    - India and Pakistan advance to the gold medal game while Iran and Bangladesh advance to the bronze medal game.
  - Sepaktakraw
    - Men's Team Semifinals – Losers win bronze
      - Malaysia 3–0 Indonesia (China)
      - Thailand 3–0 Myanmar
    - Women's Team Semifinals – Losers win bronze
      - Thailand 2–1 China
      - Vietnam 3–0 South Korea
- Chess:
  - Deep Fritz wins the confrontation with World Champion Vladimir Kramnik 4–2 in Bonn, Germany. Kramnik tried to tie the result 3–3 in the last game, but the computer won it within 47 moves.
- Cricket:
  - The Ashes 2006–07: Australia wins the Second Test in Adelaide, defeating England by six wickets. The match was dominated by high scores in the first two innings – England scoring 6/551 declared (Collingwood 206, Pietersen 158), Australia responding with 513 all out (Ponting 142, Clarke 124, Hoggard 7/109). England collapsed on the final day, dismissed for 129, leaving Australia 168 runs to win with just over two hours play remaining. The home side's victory came three overs before the close of play. Australia leads the series 2–0, with three Tests to play. (Scorecard)
  - An appeals committee acquits Pakistani fast bowlers Shoaib Akhtar and Mohammad Asif of doping charges, lifting the bans imposed on the duo in November. Both players tested positive to banned steroid nandrolone on the eve of the 2006 ICC Champions Trophy in India. The World Anti-Doping Agency labels the ruling as unreasonable and announces it will take up the case with the Pakistan Cricket Board.
- Football:
  - 2006–07 UEFA Champions League Matchday 6 (Teams advancing in **Boldface**; teams progressing to the UEFA Cup in italics):
    - Group A: **Barcelona** 2–0 Werder Bremen
    - Group A: **Chelsea** 2–0 Levski Sofia
    - Group B: Sporting 1–3 Spartak Moscow
    - Group B: **Bayern München** 1–1 **Inter Milan**
    - Group C: Galatasaray 3–2 **Liverpool**
    - Group C: **PSV Eindhoven** 1–3 Bordeaux
    - Group D: **Roma** 1–0 **Valencia**
    - Group D: Olympiakos 1–1 Shakhtar Donetsk UEFA.com

== 4 December 2006 (Monday) ==
- Asian Games
  - Badminton
    - Men's Team – Semifinals (Losers are joint bronze)
      - China 3–1 Indonesia
      - South Korea 3–1 Malaysia
    - Women's Team – Semifinals (Losers are joint bronze)
      - Japan 3–0 Singapore
      - China 3–0 South Korea
  - Bowling
    - Men's Doubles (six games): (gold) Bader Al Alshaikh & Hassan Al Alshaikh (Saudi Arabia) ; (silver) Abdulla Al Qatan & Saed Al Hajri (Qatar) and Jamal Ali Mohammad and Nayef Eqab Al Abadla (United Arab Emirates)
  - Chess
    - Men's Rapid Swiss: (gold) Murtas Kazhgaleyev (Kazakhstan) ; (silver) Dao Thien Hai (Vietnam) ; (bronze) Bu Xiangzhi China
    - Women's Rapid Swiss: (gold) Humpy Koneru (India) ; (silver) Zhao Xue (China) ; (bronze) Zhu Chen (Qatar)
  - Cue Sports
    - Men's Snooker (Doubles) – Semifinal Matches
      - Atthasit Mahitthi & Phaithoon Phonbun (Thailand) 2–3 Ding Junhui & Tian Pengfei (China)
      - Lai Chee Wei & Moh Keen Hoo (Malaysia) 0–3 Chan Wai Ki & Marco Fu Ka Chun (Hong Kong)
  - Cycling
    - Women's Road Race: (gold) Mayuko Hagiwara (Japan) ; (silver) Zhao Na (China) ; (bronze) Han Song Hee (South Korea)
  - Gymnastics
    - Men's All Around: (gold) Yang Wei (China) ; (silver) Hisashi Mizutori (Japan) ; (bronze) Hiroyuki Tomita (Japan)
    - Women's All Around: (gold) He Ning (China) ; (silver) Zhou Zhuoru (China) , (bronze) Hong Su Jong (North Korea)
  - Judo
    - Men's 66 kg.: (gold) Tsagaanbaatar Haskhbaatar (Mongolia) ; (silver) Arash Miresmaili (Iran) ; (bronze) Hiroyuki Akimoto (Japan) , Kim Kwang Sub (South Korea)
    - Men's 73 kg.: (gold) Lee Won Hee (South Korea) , (silver) Masahiro Takamatsu (Japan) ; (bronze) Rasul Boqiev (Uzbekistan) , Shokir Muminov (Tajikistan)
    - Women's 52 kg.: (gold) An Kum Ae (North Korea) ; (silver) Bundmaa Munkhbaatar (Mongolia) , (bronze) Li Ying (China) , Yuki Yokosawa (Japan)
    - Women's 57 kg.: (gold) Xu Yan (China) ; (silver) Aiko Sato (Japan) ; (bronze) Kang Sin Young (South Korea) , Hong Ok Song (North Korea)
  - Sepaktakraw
    - Women's Team: China and South Korea advance to the medal round.
  - Shooting
    - Men's 50m Rifle Prone (Indiv.): (gold) Liu Gang (China) ; (silver) Igor Pirekeev (Turkmenistan) ; (bronze) Sergey Belyayev (Kazakhstan)
    - Men's 50m Rifle Prone (Team): (gold) Kazakhstan; (silver) South Korea; (bronze) China
    - Women's 10m Running Target (Indiv.): (gold) Xu Xuan (China) ; (silver) Natalya Gurova (Kazakhstan) ; (bronze) Dang Hong Ha (Vietnam)
    - Women's 10m Running Target (Team): (gold) Kazakhstan; (silver) Vietnam; (bronze) Qatar
    - Women's 50m Rifle Prone (Indiv.): (gold) Olga Dovgun (Kazakhstan) ; (silver) Thanyalak Chotpaibunsin (Thailand) ; (bronze) Wang Chengyi (China)
    - Women's 50m Rifle Prone (Team): (gold) Thailand; (silver) China; (bronze) Kazakhstan
  - Soft Tennis
    - Mixed Doubles: (gold) We Hyu Hwan & Kim Ji Eun (South Korea) ; (silver) You Young Dong & Kim Kyung Ryun (South Korea) ; (bronze) Tsuneo Takagawa & Harumi Gyokusen (Japan)
  - Swimming
    - Men's 50m Freestyle: (gold) Rafd Zyad Almasri (Syria) ; (silver) Makoto Ito (Japan) ; (bronze) Cai Li (China)
    - Men's 100m Breaststroke: (gold) Kosuke Kitajima (Japan) ; (silver) Makoto Yamashita (Japan) ; (bronze) Vladislav Polyakov (Kazakhstan)
    - Men's 200m Backstroke: (gold) Ryosuke Irie (Japan) ; (silver) Ouyang Kunpeng (China) ; (bronze) Takashi Nakano
    - Men's 800m Freestyle Relay: (gold) Japan; (silver) China; (bronze) South Korea
    - Women's 50m Backstroke: (gold) Zhao Jing (China) ; (silver) Gao Chang (China) ; (bronze) Reiko Nakamura (Japan)
    - Women's 200m Butterfly: (gold) Yurie Yano (Japan) ; (silver) Choi Hye-Ra (South Korea) ; (bronze) Yuko Nakanishi (Japan)
    - Women's 400m Freestyle: (gold) Yang Jieqiao (China) , (silver) Zhu Wenrui (China) ; (bronze) Lee Ji-Eun (South Korea)
- NFL Monday Night Football: Philadelphia Eagles 27, Carolina Panthers 24. Two Lito Sheppard interceptions keeps the Eagles above .500 with a win at home.

== 3 December 2006 (Sunday) ==
- College football: Amid controversy, The Bowl Championship Series pairings are announced:
  - Rose Bowl, 1 Jan.: Michigan vs. Southern California
  - Fiesta Bowl, 1 Jan.: Oklahoma vs. Boise State
  - Orange Bowl, 2 Jan.: Louisville vs. Wake Forest
  - Sugar Bowl, 3 Jan.: LSU vs. Notre Dame
  - BCS National Championship Game, 8 Jan: Ohio State vs. Florida
- Asian Games
  - Badminton
    - Men's (Team): Indonesia qualifies for the medal round.
    - Women's (Team): South Korea qualifies for the medal round.
  - Bowling
  - Men's (six-game): (gold) Ryan Leonard Lalisang (Indonesia) ; (silver) Mahmood Ahmed Al Attar (United Arab Emirates) ; (bronze) Cheng Chao Sheng (Chinese Taipei)
  - Women's (six-game): (gold) Esther Cheah (Malaysia) ; (silver) Putty Armein (Indonesia) ; (bronze) Angkana Netrviseth (Thailand)
  - Cycling
    - Road Race (Men): (gold) Wong Kam Po (Hong Kong) ; (silver) Mehdi Sohrabi (Iran) ; (bronze) Park Sung Baek (South Korea)
  - Gymnastics
    - Women's (Team): (gold) China; (silver) DPR Korea (North Korea) ; (bronze) Japan
  - Judo
    - Men's (81 kg): (gold) Nyamkhuu Damdinsuren (Mongolia) ; (silver) Almas Atayev (Kazakhstan) ; (bronze) Takashi Ono (Japan) , Guo Lei (China)
    - Men's (90 kg): (gold) Hwang Hee Tae (South Korea) ; (silver) Maxim Rakov (Kazakhstan) ; (bronze) Hiroshi Izumi (Japan) , Ramziddin Sayidov (Uzbekistan)
    - Women's (63 kg): (gold) Xu Yuhua (China) ; (silver) Kong Ja Young (South Korea) ; (bronze) Won Ok Im (North Korea) , Ayumi Tanimoto (Japan)
    - Women's (70 kg): (gold) Masae Ueno (Japan) ; (silver) Bae Eun Hye (South Korea) ; (bronze) Liu Shu Yun (Chinese Taipei) , Qin Dongya (China)
  - Sepaktakraw
    - Men's (Team): Thailand, Indonesia, Myanmar, and Malaysia qualify for the medal round.
    - Women's (Team): Vietnam and Thailand qualify for the medal round.
  - Shooting
    - Men's 10m Air Pistol: (gold) Tan Zongliang (China) ; (silver) Kim Jong Su (North Korea) ; (bronze) Jin Jong Oh (South Korea)
    - Men's Trap: (gold) Naser Meqlad (Kuwait) ; (silver) Manavjit Singh Sandhu (Kuwait) , (bronze) Khaled Almudhaf (Kuwait)
    - Women's 10m Air Pistol: (gold) Tao Luna (China) ; (silver) Guo Wenjun (China) ; (bronze) Kim Byung Hee (South Korea)
  - Soft Tennis
    - Men's (Team): Medal Round
      - Japan 2–0 South Korea
      - Mongolia 0–2 Chinese Taipei (Taiwan)
      - Bronze Medal Match: South Korea 2–0 Mongolia
      - Gold Medal Match: Japan 2–1 Chinese Taipei (Taiwan)
    - Women's (Team): Medal Round
      - South Korea 2–0 Chinese Taipei (Taiwan)
      - China 0–2 Japan
      - Bronze Medal Match: Chinese Taipei (Taiwan) 2–0 China
      - Gold Medal Match: South Korea 2–1 Japan
- NFL Week 13 Sunday Games:
  - Arizona Cardinals 34, St. Louis Rams 20. Edgerrin James showed the form he had with the Colts, rushing for 115 yards, his fiftieth career 100-yard game.
  - Atlanta Falcons 24, Washington Redskins 14. Jerious Norwood's 69-yard touchdown run was the straw that broke the Redskins' back.
  - New England Patriots 28, Detroit Lions 21. Corey Dillon scored three touchdowns, and the Pats win with a comeback thanks to three late Lions turnovers.
  - Tennessee Titans 20, Indianapolis Colts 17. Rob Bironas wins the game on a 60-yard field goal, preventing the Colts from clinching the AFC South.
  - Cleveland Browns 31, Kansas City Chiefs 28 (OT). After Charlie Frye leaves with a wrist injury, backup quarterback Derek Anderson leads the Browns back from a 28–14 deficit. Phil Dawson's 33-yard field goal was the margin of victory.
  - Chicago Bears 24, Minnesota Vikings 14. The Bears thanks to Devin Hester's record-tying fourth kick return and Ricky Manning, Jr.'s return of one of four Brad Johnson interceptions for touchdowns clinch the NFC North division for the second straight year. Johnson had a 10.3 quarterback rating, while Bears' counterpart Rex Grossman finished with a 1.3 rating after having a zero for the first three quarters.
  - New York Jets 38, Green Bay Packers 10. Three drives of 70-plus yards for touchdowns in the second quarter propelled the Jets to victory over the Packers.
  - San Diego Chargers 24, Buffalo Bills 21. LaDainian Tomlinson rushes for 178 yards and two touchdowns, bringing his season total to 26 overall, two short of the league record.
  - New Orleans Saints 34, San Francisco 49ers 10. Reggie Bush has his breakout game, scoring four touchdowns with nine receptions for 131 yards in the Saints victory.
  - Jacksonville Jaguars 24, Miami Dolphins 10. The Dolphins' four game winning streak was snapped by a pair of David Garrard-led 90-plus yard touchdown drives.
  - Houston Texans 23, Oakland Raiders 14. The Texans won despite a net of minus-five yards passing.
  - Dallas Cowboys 23, New York Giants 20. Newly signed placekicker Martin Gramatica kicks three field goals, including the game-winning 46-yarder with one second left as the Cowboys improve to 8–4 in the NFC East.
  - Pittsburgh Steelers 20, Tampa Bay Buccaneers 3. The Steelers capitalized on five Buccaneers errors in their win.
  - Seattle Seahawks 23, Denver Broncos 20. Josh Brown kicks a 50-yard field goal with four seconds left, his fourth game-winning score in the final minute, spoiling Jay Cutler's debut as Broncos QB.
- Athletics: Marathon, Fukuoka, Japan:
  - Haile Gebrselassie wins the marathon of Fukuoka in 2.06.52, finishing about a minute above his personal record. Gebrselassie ran away from 2005 winner Dmitri Baranovski and two-time world champion Jaouad Gharib after 38 kilometres.
- Golf: Blue Chip New Zealand Open:
  - Nathan Green has his first ever European Tour win by finishing five under par in Whangaparaoa. He had an advantage of two strokes on seven opponents.
- Tennis: 2006 Davis Cup Final: Russia 3–2 Argentina
  - In the final day's reverse singles matches, (Argentina) David Nalbandian equalled for the Argentinians by winning his match versus (Russia) Nikolay Davydenko 6–2, 6–2, 4–6, 6–4, but (Russia) Marat Safin was too strong for (Argentina) José Acasuso in the decisive match: 6–3, 3–6, 6–3, 7–6
- Volleyball: 2006 FIVB Men's World Championship, finals:
  - Gold medal match: Poland 12–25, 22–25, 17–25 Brazil
  - Bronze medal match: Serbia and Montenegro 25–22, 23–25, 23–25, 23–25 Bulgaria

== 2 December 2006 (Saturday) ==
- Asian Games
  - Badminton
    - Men (Team) – Malaysia and China qualify for the medal round.
    - Women (Team) – Japan qualifies for the medal round.
  - Baseball
    - South Korea 7–10 Japan – Sets up game on 7 December between Japan and Chinese Taipei (Taiwan) which will almost certainly be for gold.
  - Gymnastics
    - Men (Team) (gold) China; (silver) Japan; (bronze) South Korea
  - Judo
    - Men's (100 kg): (gold) Jang Sung Ho (South Korea) ; (silver) Satoshi Ishii (Japan) ; (bronze) Utkir Kurbanov (Uzbekistan) , Askhat Zhitkeyev (Kazakhstan)
    - Men's (100 kg+): (gold) Yasuyuki Muneta (Japan) ; (silver) Mohammad Reza Rodaki (Iran) ; (bronze) Yeldos Ikhsangaliyev (Kazakhstan) , Abdullo Tangriev (Uzbekistan)
    - Women's (78 kg): (gold) Sae Nakazawa (Japan) ; (silver) Lee So Yoon (South Korea) ; (bronze) Lkhamdegd Purevjargal (Mongolia) , Yang Xiuli (China)
    - Women's (78+kg): (gold) Tong Wen (China) ; (silver) Tserenkhand Dorjgotov (Mongolia) ; (bronze) Midori Shintani (Japan) , Kim Na Young (South Korea)
  - Shooting
    - Men's 10m Air Rifle: (gold) Liu Tianyou (China) ; (silver) Zhu Qinan (China) ; (bronze) Yu Jaechul (South Korea)
    - Women's 10m Air Rifle: (gold) Du Li (China) ; (silver) Zhao Yinghui (China) ; (bronze) Wu Liuxi (China)
    - Women's Trap: (gold) Chen Li (China) ; (silver) Zhu Mei (China) ; (bronze) Lin Yin Chun (Chinese Taipei)
  - Swimming
    - Men's 200m Butterfly: (gold) Wu Peng (China) ; (silver) Takeshi Matsuda (Japan) Ryuichi Shibata (Japan)
    - Men's 400m Ind. Medley: (gold) Hidemasa Sano (Japan) ; (silver) Shinya Taneguchi (Japan) ; (bronze) Han Kyul Chul (South Korea)
    - Women's 50m Breaststroke: (gold) Ji Liping (China) ; (silver) Asami Kitagawa (Japan) ; (bronze) Wang Qun (China)
    - Women's 100m Butterfly: (gold) Zhou Yafei (China) ; (silver) Xu Yanwei (China) ; (bronze) Tao Li (Singapore)
    - Women's 200m Freestyle: (gold) Pang Jiaying (China) ; (silver) Yang Yu (China) ; (bronze) Maki Mita (Japan)
    - Women's 400m Medley Relay: (gold) China; (silver) Japan; (bronze) South Korea
  - Soft Tennis
    - Men (Team) – Chinese Taipei (Taiwan), Mongolia, South Korea, and (Japan) advance to the medal round.
    - Women (Team) – South Korea, Chinese Taipei (Taiwan), (Japan) , (China) advance to the medal round.
  - Table Tennis
    - Men (Team) – Semifinals
      - (China) 3–0 Chinese Taipei (Taiwan)
      - South Korea 3–0 Hong Kong
    - Women (Team) – Semifinals
      - (North Korea) DPR Korea 2–3 Singapore
      - South Korea 0–3 China
  - Weightlifting
    - Men (56 kg) (gold) Li Zheng (China) ; (silver) Hoang Anh Tuan (Vietnam) ; (bronze) Lee Jong Hoon (South Korea)
    - Women (48 kg) (gold) Wang Mingjuan (China) ; (silver) Pensiri Laosirikul (Thailand) ; (bronze) Thongyim Bunphithak (Thailand)
    - Women (53 kg) (gold) Li Ping (China) ; (silver) Junpim Kuntatean (Thailand) ; (bronze) Yu Wei Li (Hong Kong)
- Athletics:
  - Nathan Deakes sets a new World Record on the 50 km road walking in Geelong. He was 16 seconds faster than Robert Korzeniowski's record, resulting in a 3:35.47 finish time. At 40 km Deakes was two and a half minutes faster than Korzeniowski, but lost most of it in the final kilometres.
- Basketball (U.S. College):
  - At the Division III Salem University Invitational consolation game in Salem, West Virginia, Lincoln University beats Ohio State-Marion, 201–78. The 123-point margin of victory by the Lions is the largest in NCAA history; Lincoln's Sami Wylie sets an all-division record with 21 three-pointers in 24 minutes played, also setting a school record with 69 points. In addition, the Lions set records for most points in a half (104 in the second half), most field goal attempts and made in a game (141 and 79 respectively). ESPN
  - After sitting out seven months with a wrist injury, highly touted freshman Greg Oden makes his debut for Ohio State, racking up a double-double with 14 points and 10 rebounds in 23 minutes as the Buckeyes waltz to a 78–58 home win over Valparaiso. (ESPN)
- American college football (BCS Top 25 ranking in parentheses:):
  - (6) Louisville 48, UConn 17
  - (15) West Virginia 41, (13) Rutgers 39 (3 OT): A failed two-point-conversion attempt in triple overtime ends the Scarlet Knights' Cinderella campaign for a Big East title and sends Louisville to the BCS.
  - Navy 26, Army 14
  - (18) California 26, Stanford 17
  - UCLA 13, (2) Southern California 9: Eric McNeal's tip and interception of a John David Booty pass ends the Trojans' comeback bid and shot at the national championship. Now, Southern California will play in the Rose Bowl on New Years' Day instead.
  - (25) Oregon State 35, (24) Hawaiʻi 32
  - Conference Championships:
    - ACC in Jacksonville, Florida: (17) Wake Forest 9, (22) Georgia Tech 6. The win gives the Demon Deacons their first ACC title since 1970, and the automatic bid to the Orange Bowl.
    - SEC in Atlanta, Georgia: (4) Florida 38, (9) Arkansas 28: Wondy Pierre-Louis' end-zone fumble recovery of a muffed punt off Wayne Fish and two Percy Harvin touchdowns including a 67-yard run gave the Gators their first SEC football title since 1999. Florida will play in the Sugar Bowl if not chosen for the BCS National Championship Game against Ohio State.
    - Big 12 in Kansas City, Missouri: (12) Oklahoma 21, Nebraska, 7: The Sooners win their fourth Big 12 title and a berth in the Fiesta Bowl to face Boise State. Malcolm Kelly catches 10 passes for 143 yards and two touchdowns.
  - In another game: Troy 26, Florida International 13. With this win, the Trojans share the Sun Belt title with Middle Tennessee, but on the head-to-head tiebreaker, Troy will play in the New Orleans Bowl against Rice on 22 December, and MTSU will face Central Michigan in the Motor City Bowl 26 December in Detroit.
- Rugby union: 2006 Dubai Sevens, final:
  - South Africa 26–12 New Zealand
- Swimming: Swimming World Swimmers of the Year
  - Leisel Jones wins the Swimming World Female Swimmer of the Year award for the second consecutive time, while Michael Phelps wins the male award for the third time in a four-year period.
- Tennis: 2006 Davis Cup Final:
  - Russia leads Argentina 2–1.
    - (Russia) Dmitri Tursunov and Marat Safin beat (Argentina) David Nalbandian and Agustín Calleri 6–2 6–3 6–4
- Volleyball: 2006 FIVB Men's World Championship, semi finals:
  - Poland 25–20, 26–28, 25–23, 25–23 Bulgaria
  - Serbia and Montenegro 19–25, 25–15, 22–25, 12–25 Brazil
- Boxing: Miguel Cotto defeats fellow Puerto Rican Carlos "The Indian" Quintana with a fifth-round knockout to win the WBA Welterweight Championship-which had been vacated by Ricky Hatton earlier in the year-and Mexico's Antonio Margarito outpoints Ghana's Joshua Clottey to retain his WBO Welterweight title, in Atlantic City.

== 1 December 2006 (Friday) ==
- American college football: Conference USA Championship at Houston
  - Houston 34, Southern Miss 20
- Cricket: West Indies in Pakistan:
  - Pakistan defeats West Indies by 199 runs in the Third Test at Karachi to claim the three-Test series 2–0. Pakistani batsmen Mohammad Yousuf breaks a 30-year-old Test cricket record of most runs in a calendar year, eclipsing Sir Viv Richards' 1,710 runs made in 1976. Yousuf now has 1,788 runs in 2006. (Scorecard) (Cricinfo article)
- Football (soccer):
  - Henrik Larsson will play on loan for Manchester United from January until March 2007. Larsson left FC Barcelona last season to end his career at Helsingborgs IF in his home country.
- Horse racing:
  - Russell Baze becomes the winningest jockey in thoroughbred racing history, surpassing Laffit Pincay, Jr. with 9,531 career wins. He was aboard Butterfly Belle for the record-setting win in the fourth race at Bay Meadows. (ESPN)
- Squash:
  - The two-year suspension of Karen Kronemeyer who was tested positive on using benzylpiperazine is reduced to one year. While appealing the suspension she convinced the jury that she did not use the doping substance on purpose. The jury however still believes Kronemeyer should have paid more attention and reduced the suspension with 50%. Kronemeyer's suspension started in February 2006 and will be able to compete again in February 2007.
- Tennis: 2006 Davis Cup final:
  - Russia and Argentina are still equal after the first day of tennis in Moscow.
    - Nikolay Davydenko (Russia) won in four sets, 6–1, 6–2, 5–7, 6–4 against (Argentina) Juan Ignacio Chela, while (Argentina) David Nalbandian was the better side in straight sets, 6–4 6–4 6–4 over (Russia) Marat Safin.
