= Sepak takraw at the 2006 Asian Games =

- Venue: Al-Sadd Indoor Hall
- Dates: 2–13 December 2006
- Competitors: 171 from 11 nations

Sepak takraw was contested at the 2006 Asian Games in Doha, Qatar by both men and women. The sepak takraw competition included Team, Regu, and Doubles events, with all games taking place at Al-Sadd Indoor Hall.

== Schedule ==
P	Preliminary round	½	Semifinals	F	Final

Event↓/Date →	2nd Sat	3rd Sun	4th Mon	5th Tue	6th Wed	7th Thu	8th Fri	9th Sat	10th Sun		11th Mon	12th Tue	13th Wed	
Men's doubles											P	P	½	F
Men's regu							P	P	½	F				
Men's team regu	P	P	P	½	F									
Women's doubles											P	P	½	F
Women's regu							P	P	½	F				
Women's team regu	P	P	P	½	F									

== Medalists ==
=== Men ===
Event	Gold	Silver	Bronze
Doubles	Thailand; Rawat Parbchompoo; Purich Pansira; Rattikorn Pealun	Myanmar; Zaw Latt; Aung Cho Myint; Si Thu Lin	Malaysia; Azman Nasruddin; Saiful Nizam Mohd; Saufi Salleh
Doubles	Thailand; Rawat Parbchompoo; Purich Pansira; Rattikorn Pealun	Myanmar; Zaw Latt; Aung Cho Myint; Si Thu Lin	Indonesia; Yudi Purnomo; Jusri Pakke; Husni Uba
Regu	Thailand; Suebsak Phunsueb; Panomporn Aiemsaard; Pornchai Kaokaew; Somporn Jaisinghol; Singha Somsakul	Malaysia; Normanizam Ahmad; Sulaiman Salleh; Futra Abd Ghani; Azlan Abdul Mubin; Zulkarnain Arif	Myanmar; Yazar Tun; Zaw Latt; Oaka Soe; Aung Cho Myint; Zaw Zaw Aung
Regu	Thailand; Suebsak Phunsueb; Panomporn Aiemsaard; Pornchai Kaokaew; Somporn Jaisinghol; Singha Somsakul	Malaysia; Normanizam Ahmad; Sulaiman Salleh; Futra Abd Ghani; Azlan Abdul Mubin; Zulkarnain Arif	Indonesia; Yudi Purnomo; Muhammad Nasrum; Jusri Pakke; Husni Uba; Edy Suwarno
Team regu	Thailand; Sakol Jandoung; Suebsak Phunsueb; Panomporn Aiemsaard; Sarawut Inlek; Pornchai Kaokaew; Rangsirod Sirisamutsarn; Worapot Thongsai; Terdsak Pilae; Somporn Jaisinghol; Suriyan Peachan; Singha Somsakul; Prasert Pongpung	Malaysia; Normanizam Ahmad; Sulaiman Salleh; Saifudin Hussin; Ahmad Sufi Hashim; Futra Abd Ghani; Azlan Abdul Mubin; Azman Nasruddin; Noor Ariffin Pawanteh; Zulhafizazudin Rosslan; Zulkarnain Arif; Rukman Mustapha; Saufi Salleh	Myanmar; Thein Zaw Min; Yazar Tun; Zaw Latt; Oaka Soe; Zaw Zaw Aung; Aung Cho Myint; Sithu Linn; Aung Myo Swe; Kyaw Thi Ha Oo; Zaw Zaw Aung; Tun Tun Naing
Team regu	Thailand; Sakol Jandoung; Suebsak Phunsueb; Panomporn Aiemsaard; Sarawut Inlek; Pornchai Kaokaew; Rangsirod Sirisamutsarn; Worapot Thongsai; Terdsak Pilae; Somporn Jaisinghol; Suriyan Peachan; Singha Somsakul; Prasert Pongpung	Malaysia; Normanizam Ahmad; Sulaiman Salleh; Saifudin Hussin; Ahmad Sufi Hashim; Futra Abd Ghani; Azlan Abdul Mubin; Azman Nasruddin; Noor Ariffin Pawanteh; Zulhafizazudin Rosslan; Zulkarnain Arif; Rukman Mustapha; Saufi Salleh	Indonesia; Abrian Sihab Aldilatama; Suko Hartono; Yudi Purnomo; Wisnu Dwi Suhantoro; Muhammad Nasrum; Triaji; Jusri Pakke; Husni Uba; Muhammad Suardi; Edy Suwarno; Nurkholis; Stephanus Sampe

=== Women ===
Event	Gold	Silver	Bronze
Doubles	Vietnam; Nguyễn Đức Thu Hiền; Lưu Thị Thanh; Nguyễn Hải Thảo	Myanmar; Kyu Kyu Thin; May Zin Phyoe; Khin Aye Maw	Japan; Sawa Aoki; Chiharu Oku; Mari Nakagawa
Doubles	Vietnam; Nguyễn Đức Thu Hiền; Lưu Thị Thanh; Nguyễn Hải Thảo	Myanmar; Kyu Kyu Thin; May Zin Phyoe; Khin Aye Maw	China; Sun Xiaodan; Wang Xiaohua; Wang Jianshuang
Regu	Thailand; Areerat Takan; Nitinadda Kaewkamsai; Tidawan Daosakul; Pinporn Klongbungkar; Phutsadi Suancharun	Vietnam; Lưu Thị Thanh; Nguyễn Thị Thúy An; Nguyễn Thị Bích Thủy; Nguyễn Thịnh Thu Ba; Nguyễn Hải Thảo	China; Zhou Ronghong; Sun Xiaodan; Wang Xiaohua; Wang Jianshuang; Lu Jiajia
Regu	Thailand; Areerat Takan; Nitinadda Kaewkamsai; Tidawan Daosakul; Pinporn Klongbungkar; Phutsadi Suancharun	Vietnam; Lưu Thị Thanh; Nguyễn Thị Thúy An; Nguyễn Thị Bích Thủy; Nguyễn Thịnh Thu Ba; Nguyễn Hải Thảo	Myanmar; Kyu Kyu Thin; May Zin Phyoe; Naing Naing Win; Khin Aye Maw
Team regu	Vietnam; Nguyễn Đức Thu Hiền; Lưu Thị Thanh; Nguyễn Thị Thúy An; Nguyễn Thị Hoa; Nguyễn Thị Bích Thủy; Nguyễn Thịnh Thu Ba; Nguyễn Hải Thảo; Lê Thị Hạnh; Đỗ Thị Thu Hiền; Cao Thị Yến; Nguyễn Bạch Vân	Thailand; Areerat Takan; Nitinadda Kaewkamsai; Nittaya Tukaew; Anchalee Suvanmajo; Nisa Thanaattawut; Tidawan Daosakul; Payom Srihongsa; Pinporn Klongbungkar; Phutsadi Suancharun; Sahattiya Faksra; Chotika Boonthong; Viparat Ruangrat	China; Zhou Ronghong; Sun Xiaodan; Wang Xiaohua; Wang Jianshuang; Lu Jiajia; Song Cheng; Chen Caiping; Feng Zhiying; Wang Yan; Li Yajing
Team regu	Vietnam; Nguyễn Đức Thu Hiền; Lưu Thị Thanh; Nguyễn Thị Thúy An; Nguyễn Thị Hoa; Nguyễn Thị Bích Thủy; Nguyễn Thịnh Thu Ba; Nguyễn Hải Thảo; Lê Thị Hạnh; Đỗ Thị Thu Hiền; Cao Thị Yến; Nguyễn Bạch Vân	Thailand; Areerat Takan; Nitinadda Kaewkamsai; Nittaya Tukaew; Anchalee Suvanmajo; Nisa Thanaattawut; Tidawan Daosakul; Payom Srihongsa; Pinporn Klongbungkar; Phutsadi Suancharun; Sahattiya Faksra; Chotika Boonthong; Viparat Ruangrat	South Korea; Lee Myung-eun; Park Keum-duk; Jung Ji-yung; Ahn Soon-ok; Jeong In-seon; Yu Yeong-sim; Kim Hee-jin; Park Na-yeon; Song Jung-a; Kim Mi-jeong

== Medal table ==
Rank	Nation	Gold	Silver	Bronze	Total
1	Thailand (THA)	4	1	0	5
2	Vietnam (VIE)	2	1	0	3
3	Myanmar (MYA)	0	2	3	5
4	Malaysia (MAS)	0	2	1	3
5	China (CHN)	0	0	3	3
5	Indonesia (INA)	0	0	3	3
7	Japan (JPN)	0	0	1	1
7	South Korea (KOR)	0	0	1	1
Totals (8 entries)		6	6	12	24

== Participating nations ==
A total of 171 athletes from 11 nations competed in sepak takraw at the 2006 Asian Games:

- China (10)
- India (24)
- Indonesia (12)
- Iran (4)
- Japan (18)
- Malaysia (13)
- Myanmar (15)
- Philippines (7)
- South Korea (22)
- Thailand (30)
- Vietnam (16)
