= Weightlifting at the 2006 Asian Games =

- Venue: Al-Dana Banquet Hall
- Dates: 2–6 December 2006
- Competitors: 173 from 34 nations

Weightlifting was contested by both men and women at the 2006 Asian Games in Doha, Qatar from December 2 to December 6, 2006. There are seven weight categories for the women and eight for the men. All competition took place at the Banquet Hall, Al-Dana Club.

India did not take part in this weightlifting events after the government failed to pay a USD50,000 fine to the International Weightlifting Federation (IWF) to lift their suspension. The IWF suspended India's weightlifting team from any sports events after they failed doping tests during the 2006 Commonwealth Games in Melbourne, Australia.

Iran also had same sanctions after 9 weightlifters failed doping test before the World Championships in Dominican Republic, but after Iran Weightlifting Federation agreed to pay US$400,000, Iran clear to compete.

== Schedule ==
B	Group B	A	Group A

Event↓/Date →	2nd Sat		3rd Sun		4th Mon		5th Tue		6th Wed	
Men's 56 kg	B	A								
Men's 62 kg			B	A						
Men's 69 kg			B	A						
Men's 77 kg					B	A				
Men's 85 kg							B	A		
Men's 94 kg							A			
Men's 105 kg									B	A
Men's +105 kg									A	
Women's 48 kg	A									
Women's 53 kg	A									
Women's 58 kg			A							
Women's 63 kg					A					
Women's 69 kg					A					
Women's 75 kg							A			
Women's +75 kg									A	

== Medalists ==
=== Men ===
Event	Gold	Silver	Bronze
56 kg	Li Zheng; China	Hoàng Anh Tuấn; Vietnam	Lee Jong-hoon; South Korea
62 kg	Qiu Le; China	Mao Jiao; China	Im Yong-su; North Korea
69 kg	Zhang Guozheng; China	Shi Zhiyong; China	Kim Sun-bae; South Korea
77 kg	Li Hongli; China	Lee Jeong-jae; South Korea	Harem Taha; Iraq
85 kg	Vyacheslav Yershov; Kazakhstan	Lu Yong; China	Kim Seon-jong; South Korea
94 kg	Ilya Ilyin; Kazakhstan	Lee Ung-jo; South Korea	Hsieh Wei-chun; Chinese Taipei
105 kg	Ahed Joughili; Syria	Mohammed Jasim; Iraq	Bakhyt Akhmetov; Kazakhstan
+105 kg	Hossein Rezazadeh; Iran	Jaber Saeed Salem; Qatar	Andrey Martemyanov; Uzbekistan

=== Women ===
Event	Gold	Silver	Bronze
48 kg	Wang Mingjuan; China	Pensiri Laosirikul; Thailand	Thongyim Bunphithak; Thailand
53 kg	Li Ping; China	Junpim Kuntatean; Thailand	Yu Weili; Hong Kong
58 kg	Chen Yanqing; China	Wandee Kameaim; Thailand	Pak Hyon-suk; North Korea
63 kg	Pawina Thongsuk; Thailand	Ouyang Xiaofang; China	Thaw Yae Faw; Myanmar
69 kg	Liu Haixia; China	Yar Thet Pan; Myanmar	Kim Mi-kyung; South Korea
75 kg	Cao Lei; China	Kim Soon-hee; South Korea	Sinta Darmariani; Indonesia
+75 kg	Mu Shuangshuang; China	Jang Mi-ran; South Korea	Annipa Moontar; Thailand

== Medal table ==
Rank	Nation	Gold	Silver	Bronze	Total
1	China (CHN)	10	4	0	14
2	Kazakhstan (KAZ)	2	0	1	3
3	Thailand (THA)	1	3	2	6
4	Iran (IRI)	1	0	0	1
4	Syria (SYR)	1	0	0	1
6	South Korea (KOR)	0	4	4	8
7	Iraq (IRQ)	0	1	1	2
7	Myanmar (MYA)	0	1	1	2
9	Qatar (QAT)	0	1	0	1
9	Vietnam (VIE)	0	1	0	1
11	North Korea (PRK)	0	0	2	2
12	Chinese Taipei (TPE)	0	0	1	1
12	Hong Kong (HKG)	0	0	1	1
12	Indonesia (INA)	0	0	1	1
12	Uzbekistan (UZB)	0	0	1	1
Totals (15 entries)		15	15	15	45

== Participating nations ==
A total of 173 athletes from 34 nations competed in weightlifting at the 2006 Asian Games:

- Bahrain (4)
- Bangladesh (1)
- China (14)
- Chinese Taipei (6)
- Hong Kong (1)
- Indonesia (5)
- Iran (1)
- Iraq (4)
- Japan (6)
- Jordan (2)
- Kazakhstan (15)
- Kuwait (1)
- Kyrgyzstan (6)
- Lebanon (5)
- Macau (2)
- Malaysia (3)
- Mongolia (3)
- Myanmar (5)
- Nepal (1)
- North Korea (7)
- Oman (3)
- Pakistan (5)
- Palestine (2)
- Philippines (2)
- Qatar (7)
- Saudi Arabia (6)
- South Korea (12)
- Sri Lanka (2)
- Syria (6)
- Thailand (11)
- Timor-Leste (2)
- Turkmenistan (8)
- Uzbekistan (8)
- Vietnam (7)
