= Sepak takraw at the 2006 Asian Games – Women's regu =

Women's regu at the 2006 Asian Games
- Venue: Al-Sadd Indoor Hall
- Date: 8–10 December 2006
- Competitors: 37 from 8 nations

Medalists
gold medal	Thailand
silver medal	Vietnam
bronze medal	China
bronze medal	Myanmar

The women's regu sepak takraw competition at the 2006 Asian Games in Doha was held from 8 December to 10 December at the Al-Sadd Indoor Hall.

== Squads ==
China	India	Japan	Myanmar
Zhou Ronghong; Sun Xiaodan; Wang Xiaohua; Wang Jianshuang; Lu Jiajia	Ronibala Chanu; Meri Devi Moirangthem; Bilashini Devi Oinam; Romita Devi Maibam; Rasheshwari Devi Elangbam	Keiko Ishikawa; Sawa Aoki; Chiharu Oku; Mari Nakagawa; Aika Hara	Kyu Kyu Thin; May Zin Phyoe; Naing Naing Win; Khin Aye Maw
Philippines	South Korea	Thailand	Vietnam
Deseree Autor; Irene Apdon; Jean Rose Babilonia	Lee Myung-eun; Park Keum-duk; Jung Ji-yung; Ahn Soon-ok; Jeong In-seon	Areerat Takan; Nitinadda Kaewkamsai; Tidawan Daosakul; Pinporn Klongbungkar; Phutsadi Suancharun	Lưu Thị Thanh; Nguyễn Thị Thúy An; Nguyễn Thị Bích Thủy; Nguyễn Thịnh Thu Ba; Nguyễn Hải Thảo

== Results ==
All times are Arabia Standard Time (UTC+03:00)

=== Preliminary ===
==== Group X ====
Pos	Team	Pld	W	L	SF	SA	SD	Pts	Qualification
1	Thailand	3	3	0	6	0	+6	6	Semifinals
2	Myanmar	3	2	1	4	3	+1	4	Semifinals
3	Japan	3	1	2	3	4	−1	2	
4	Philippines	3	0	3	0	6	−6	0	

Source: Official website

Date	Time		Score		Set 1	Set 2	Set 3
08 Dec	09:00	Thailand	2–0	Philippines	21–5	21–6	
08 Dec	10:00	Japan	1–2	Myanmar	14–21	23–21	11–15
08 Dec	19:00	Thailand	2–0	Myanmar	23–21	21–13	
08 Dec	20:00	Japan	2–0	Philippines	21–9	21–5	
09 Dec	10:00	Philippines	0–2	Myanmar	10–21	12–21	
09 Dec	14:00	Thailand	2–0	Japan	21–7	21–14	

==== Group Y ====
Pos	Team	Pld	W	L	SF	SA	SD	Pts	Qualification
1	Vietnam	3	3	0	6	1	+5	6	Semifinals
2	China	3	2	1	4	3	+1	4	Semifinals
3	South Korea	3	1	2	4	4	0	2	
4	India	3	0	3	0	6	−6	0	

Source: Official website

Date	Time		Score		Set 1	Set 2	Set 3
08 Dec	15:00	China	2–0	India	21–5	21–11	
08 Dec	16:00	Vietnam	2–1	South Korea	21–16	22–24	15–8
08 Dec	19:00	China	2–1	South Korea	18–21	21–12	15–10
08 Dec	20:00	Vietnam	2–0	India	21–9	21–5	
09 Dec	09:00	India	0–2	South Korea	15–21	13–21	
09 Dec	15:00	China	0–2	Vietnam	18–21	12–21	

=== Knockout round ===
Semifinals
10 December
Thailand	2
China	0
10 December
Vietnam	2
Myanmar	0

Final
10 December
Thailand	2
Vietnam	1

==== Semifinals ====
Date	Time		Score		Set 1	Set 2	Set 3
10 Dec	09:00	Thailand	2–0	China	21–11	21–10	
10 Dec	10:00	Vietnam	2–0	Myanmar	21–12	21–12	

==== Final ====
Date	Time		Score		Set 1	Set 2	Set 3
10 Dec	16:00	Thailand	2–1	Vietnam	19–21	23–21	15–9
