= Sepak takraw at the 2006 Asian Games – Men's doubles =

Men's doubles at the 2006 Asian Games
- Venue: Al-Sadd Indoor Hall
- Date: 11–13 December 2006
- Competitors: 30 from 10 nations

Medalists
gold medal	Thailand
silver medal	Myanmar
bronze medal	Malaysia
bronze medal	Indonesia

The men's double regu sepak takraw competition at the 2006 Asian Games in Doha was held from 11 December to 13 December at the Al-Sadd Indoor Hall.

== Squads ==
India	Indonesia	Iran	Japan
Surjit Singh Waikom; Jotin Singh Khangembam; Kiran Kumar Singh	Yudi Purnomo; Jusri Pakke; Husni Uba	Armin Farazmand; Majid Salmani; Jamil Kor	Susumu Teramoto; Yuichi Matsuda; Takeshi Terashima
Malaysia	Myanmar	Philippines	South Korea
Azman Nasruddin; Saiful Nizam Mohd; Saufi Salleh	Zaw Latt; Aung Cho Myint; Si Thu Lin	Jolly Aglubo; Danilo Alipan; Metodio Suico	Lee Gyu-nam; Lee Jun-ho; Hwang Yong-kwan
Thailand	Vietnam		
Rawat Parbchompoo; Purich Pansira; Rattikorn Pealun	Trịnh Đình Kiên; Đỗ Trung Hiếu; Nguyễn Trọng Thủy		

== Results ==
All times are Arabia Standard Time (UTC+03:00)

=== Preliminary ===
==== Group A ====
Pos	Team	Pld	W	L	SF	SA	SD	Pts	Qualification
1	Myanmar	4	4	0	8	0	+8	8	Semifinals
2	Indonesia	4	3	1	6	3	+3	6	Semifinals
3	Japan	4	2	2	5	4	+1	4	
4	Vietnam	4	1	3	2	7	−5	2	
5	Iran	4	0	4	1	8	−7	0	

Source: Official website

Date	Time		Score		Set 1	Set 2	Set 3
11 Dec	09:00	Japan	2–0	Iran	21–14	21–8	
11 Dec	10:00	Vietnam	0–2	Indonesia	16–21	11–21	
11 Dec	14:00	Japan	0–2	Myanmar	19–21	18–21	
11 Dec	15:00	Indonesia	2–0	Iran	21–9	21–15	
11 Dec	18:00	Vietnam	0–2	Myanmar	14–21	19–21	
12 Dec	09:00	Vietnam	2–1	Iran	21–15	17–21	15–13
12 Dec	10:00	Myanmar	2–0	Indonesia	21–19	23–21	
12 Dec	14:00	Japan	2–0	Vietnam	25–23	21–10	
12 Dec	15:00	Myanmar	2–0	Iran	21–8	21–11	
12 Dec	18:00	Japan	1–2	Indonesia	21–16	14–21	12–15

==== Group B ====
Pos	Team	Pld	W	L	SF	SA	SD	Pts	Qualification
1	Thailand	4	4	0	8	1	+7	8	Semifinals
2	Malaysia	4	3	1	6	3	+3	6	Semifinals
3	Philippines	4	2	2	4	5	−1	4	
4	South Korea	4	1	3	5	6	−1	2	
5	India	4	0	4	0	8	−8	0	

Source: Official website

Date	Time		Score		Set 1	Set 2	Set 3
11 Dec	09:00	Philippines	2–1	South Korea	15–21	23–21	15–9
11 Dec	10:00	Malaysia	0–2	Thailand	15–21	16–21	
11 Dec	14:00	Philippines	2–0	India	21–15	21–15	
11 Dec	15:00	Thailand	2–1	South Korea	21–18	17–21	17–15
11 Dec	19:00	Malaysia	2–0	India	21–7	21–15	
12 Dec	09:00	Malaysia	2–1	South Korea	21–14	14–21	15–11
12 Dec	10:00	India	0–2	Thailand	11–21	12–21	
12 Dec	14:00	Philippines	0–2	Malaysia	14–21	18–21	
12 Dec	15:00	India	0–2	South Korea	18–21	15–21	
12 Dec	18:00	Philippines	0–2	Thailand	13–21	16–21	

=== Knockout round ===
Semifinals
13 December
Myanmar	2
Malaysia	1
13 December
Thailand	2
Indonesia	0

Final
13 December
Myanmar	0
Thailand	2

==== Semifinals ====
Date	Time		Score		Set 1	Set 2	Set 3
13 Dec	11:00	Myanmar	2–1	Malaysia	21–16	23–25	15–12
13 Dec	13:00	Thailand	2–0	Indonesia	21–18	25–24	

==== Final ====
Date	Time		Score		Set 1	Set 2	Set 3
13 Dec	17:00	Myanmar	0–2	Thailand	17–21	15–21	
