= Weightlifting at the 2006 Asian Games – Women's 69 kg =

Women's 69 kg at the 2006 Asian Games
- Venue: Al-Dana Banquet Hall
- Date: 4 December 2006
- Competitors: 5 from 5 nations

Medalists
gold medal	Liu Haixia	China
silver medal	Yar Thet Pan	Myanmar
bronze medal	Kim Mi-kyung	South Korea

The women's 69 kilograms event at the 2006 Asian Games took place on December 4, 2006 at Al-Dana Banquet Hall in Doha.

== Schedule ==
All times are Arabia Standard Time (UTC+03:00)

Date	Time	Event
Monday, 4 December 2006	16:00	Group A

== Records ==
Prior to this competition, the existing world, Asian and Games records were as follows.

World Record	Snatch	Oxana Slivenko (RUS)	123 kg	Santo Domingo, Dominican Rep.	4 October 2006
World Record	Clean & Jerk	Zarema Kasaeva (RUS)	157 kg	Doha, Qatar	13 November 2005
World Record	Total	Liu Chunhong (CHN)	275 kg	Athens, Greece	19 August 2004
Asian Record	Snatch	Liu Chunhong (CHN)	122 kg	Athens, Greece	19 August 2004
Asian Record	Clean & Jerk	Liu Haixia (CHN)	154 kg	Doha, Qatar	13 November 2005
Asian Record	Total	Liu Chunhong (CHN)	275 kg	Athens, Greece	19 August 2004
Games Record	Snatch	Liu Chunhong (CHN)	115 kg	Busan, South Korea	6 October 2002
Games Record	Clean & Jerk	Liu Chunhong (CHN)	148 kg	Busan, South Korea	6 October 2002
Games Record	Total	Liu Chunhong (CHN)	262 kg	Busan, South Korea	6 October 2002

== Results ==
Rank	Athlete	Group	Body weight	Snatch (kg)				Clean & Jerk (kg)				Total
Rank	Athlete	Group	Body weight	1	2	3	Result	1	2	3	Result	Total
1st place, gold medalist(s)	Liu Haixia (CHN)	A	68.47	~~110~~	110	115	115	135	142	150	150	265
2nd place, silver medalist(s)	Yar Thet Pan (MYA)	A	68.42	97	100	105	105	120	126	130	130	235
3rd place, bronze medalist(s)	Kim Mi-kyung (KOR)	A	68.69	93	~~98~~	~~98~~	93	118	126	130	130	223
4	Ranya Soliman (SYR)	A	67.23	70	~~75~~	75	75	90	95	98	98	173
DQ	Elmira Ramileva (UZB)	A	65.77	65	70	~~75~~	70	80	90	~~103~~	90	~~160~~

- Elmira Ramileva of Uzbekistan originally finished 5th, but was disqualified after she tested positive for Stanozolol.

== New records ==
The following records were established during the competition.

Clean & Jerk	150	Liu Haixia (CHN)	GR
Total	265	Liu Haixia (CHN)	GR
