= Sepak takraw at the 2006 Asian Games – Men's team regu =

Men's team regu at the 2006 Asian Games
- Venue: Al-Sadd Indoor Hall
- Date: 2–6 December 2006
- Competitors: 80 from 7 nations

Medalists
gold medal	Thailand
silver medal	Malaysia
bronze medal	Myanmar
bronze medal	Indonesia

The men's team regu sepak takraw competition at the 2006 Asian Games in Doha was held from 2 December to 6 December at the Al-Sadd Indoor Hall.

== Squads ==
India	Indonesia	Japan	Malaysia
Rakeshor Singh Ngasepam; Sanathoi Singh Akoijam; Vikesh Kumar Minam; Chinganbam Geskant; Surjit Singh Waikom; Premananda Singh; Srikanth Ramakrishnan; Biken Singh Chabungbam; Durjit Singh Pangambam; Deepak Saxena; Jotin Singh Khangembam; Kiran Kumar Singh	Abrian Sihab Aldilatama; Suko Hartono; Yudi Purnomo; Wisnu Dwi Suhantoro; Muhammad Nasrum; Triaji; Jusri Pakke; Husni Uba; Muhammad Suardi; Edy Suwarno; Nurkholis; Stephanus Sampe	Susumu Teramoto; Yuichi Matsuda; Takeshi Terashima; Yoshitaka Iida; Tomoyuki Nakatsuka; Ritsuya Hirase; Jun Motohashi; Kenji Tajiri; Shohei Miyadera	Normanizam Ahmad; Sulaiman Salleh; Saifudin Hussin; Ahmad Sufi Hashim; Futra Abd Ghani; Azlan Abdul Mubin; Azman Nasruddin; Noor Ariffin Pawanteh; Zulhafizazudin Rosslan; Zulkarnain Arif; Rukman Mustapha; Saufi Salleh
Myanmar	South Korea	Thailand	
Thein Zaw Min; Yazar Tun; Zaw Latt; Oaka Soe; Zaw Zaw Aung; Aung Cho Myint; Sithu Linn; Aung Myo Swe; Kyaw Thi Ha Oo; Zaw Zaw Aung; Tun Tun Naing	Chong Yun-hong; Lee Gyu-nam; Kim Dong-a; Gwak Young-duk; Kim Hyun-jun; Lee Jun-ho; Han Sang-hwi; Joo Hyun-jin; Ko Myung-suk; Hwang Yong-kwan; Shim Jae-chul; Seo Hae-yun	Sakol Jandoung; Suebsak Phunsueb; Panomporn Aiemsaard; Sarawut Inlek; Pornchai Kaokaew; Rangsirod Sirisamutsarn; Worapot Thongsai; Terdsak Pilae; Somporn Jaisinghol; Suriyan Peachan; Singha Somsakul; Prasert Pongpung	

== Results ==
All times are Arabia Standard Time (UTC+03:00)

=== Preliminary ===
==== Group A ====
Pos	Team	Pld	W	L	MF	MA	MD	Pts	Qualification
1	Thailand	2	2	0	6	0	+6	4	Semifinals
2	Indonesia	2	1	1	2	4	−2	2	Semifinals
3	South Korea	2	0	2	1	5	−4	0	

Source: Official website

Date	Time		Score		Regu 1			Regu 2			Regu 3		
Date	Time		Score		Set 1	Set 2	Set 3	Set 1	Set 2	Set 3	Set 1	Set 2	Set 3
02 Dec	09:00	South Korea	1–2	Indonesia	0–2			0–2			2–1		
02 Dec	09:00	South Korea	1–2	Indonesia	14–21	17–21		13–21	17–21		21–18	19–21	15–12
03 Dec	09:00	Thailand	3–0	South Korea	2–0			2–0			2–0		
03 Dec	09:00	Thailand	3–0	South Korea	21–11	21–12		21–14	21–10		21–16	21–11	
04 Dec	09:00	Thailand	3–0	Indonesia	2–0			2–0			2–0		
04 Dec	09:00	Thailand	3–0	Indonesia	21–12	21–11		21–12	21–10		21–17	21–17	

==== Group B ====
Pos	Team	Pld	W	L	MF	MA	MD	Pts	Qualification
1	Malaysia	3	3	0	9	0	+9	6	Semifinals
2	Myanmar	3	2	1	6	3	+3	4	Semifinals
3	Japan	3	1	2	2	7	−5	2	
4	India	3	0	3	1	8	−7	0	

Source: Official website

Date	Time		Score		Regu 1			Regu 2			Regu 3		
Date	Time		Score		Set 1	Set 2	Set 3	Set 1	Set 2	Set 3	Set 1	Set 2	Set 3
02 Dec	09:00	Malaysia	3–0	India	2–0			2–0			2–0		
02 Dec	09:00	Malaysia	3–0	India	21–7	21–10		21–12	21–7		Walkover		
02 Dec	09:00	Myanmar	3–0	Japan	2–0			2–0			2–0		
02 Dec	09:00	Myanmar	3–0	Japan	21–17	21–19		21–17	21–15		21–12	21–12	
03 Dec	09:00	Malaysia	3–0	Japan	2–0			2–0			2–0		
03 Dec	09:00	Malaysia	3–0	Japan	21–16	21–13		21–14	21–8		21–14	21–12	
03 Dec	09:00	Myanmar	3–0	India	2–0			2–0			2–0		
03 Dec	09:00	Myanmar	3–0	India	24–22	21–11		21–14	21–18		Walkover		
04 Dec	09:00	India	1–2	Japan	2–0			0–2			0–2		
04 Dec	09:00	India	1–2	Japan	21–19	21–18		6–21	12–21		16–21	13–21	
04 Dec	09:00	Malaysia	3–0	Myanmar	2–0			2–0			2–1		
04 Dec	09:00	Malaysia	3–0	Myanmar	21–6	21–17		21–10	21–18		21–9	19–21	15–8

=== Knockout round ===
Semifinals
5 December
Thailand	3
Myanmar	0
5 December
Malaysia	3
Indonesia	0

Final
6 December
Thailand	2
Malaysia	0

==== Semifinals ====
Date	Time		Score		Regu 1			Regu 2			Regu 3		
Date	Time		Score		Set 1	Set 2	Set 3	Set 1	Set 2	Set 3	Set 1	Set 2	Set 3
05 Dec	15:00	Thailand	3–0	Myanmar	2–0			2–0			2–0		
05 Dec	15:00	Thailand	3–0	Myanmar	21–13	21–12		21–12	21–14		Walkover		
05 Dec	18:00	Malaysia	3–0	Indonesia	2–0			2–0			2–0		
05 Dec	18:00	Malaysia	3–0	Indonesia	21–9	21–11		21–16	21–16		21–17	21–13	

==== Final ====
Date	Time		Score		Regu 1			Regu 2			Regu 3		
Date	Time		Score		Set 1	Set 2	Set 3	Set 1	Set 2	Set 3	Set 1	Set 2	Set 3
06 Dec	16:00	Thailand	2–0	Malaysia	2–0			2–0					
06 Dec	16:00	Thailand	2–0	Malaysia	21–15	21–15		22–20	21–12				
