= Weightlifting at the 2006 Asian Games – Women's 63 kg =

Women's 63 kg at the 2006 Asian Games
- Venue: Al-Dana Banquet Hall
- Date: 4 December 2006
- Competitors: 7 from 7 nations

Medalists
gold medal	Pawina Thongsuk	Thailand
silver medal	Ouyang Xiaofang	China
bronze medal	Thaw Yae Faw	Myanmar

The women's 63 kilograms event at the 2006 Asian Games took place on December 4, 2006 at Al-Dana Banquet Hall in Doha.

== Schedule ==
All times are Arabia Standard Time (UTC+03:00)

Date	Time	Event
Monday, 4 December 2006	13:00	Group A

== Records ==
Prior to this competition, the existing world, Asian and Games records were as follows.

World Record	Snatch	Pawina Thongsuk (THA)	116 kg	Doha, Qatar	12 November 2005
World Record	Clean & Jerk	Svetlana Shimkova (RUS)	141 kg	Władysławowo, Poland	3 May 2006
World Record	Total	Pawina Thongsuk (THA)	256 kg	Doha, Qatar	12 November 2005
Asian Record	Snatch	Pawina Thongsuk (THA)	116 kg	Doha, Qatar	12 November 2005
Asian Record	Clean & Jerk	Pawina Thongsuk (THA)	140 kg	Doha, Qatar	12 November 2005
Asian Record	Total	Pawina Thongsuk (THA)	256 kg	Doha, Qatar	12 November 2005
Games Record	Snatch	Lei Li (CHN)	107 kg	Bangkok, Thailand	10 December 1998
Games Record	Clean & Jerk	Liu Xia (CHN)	135 kg	Busan, South Korea	3 October 2002
Games Record	Total	Liu Xia (CHN)	240 kg	Busan, South Korea	3 October 2002

== Results ==
Rank	Athlete	Group	Body weight	Snatch (kg)				Clean & Jerk (kg)				Total
Rank	Athlete	Group	Body weight	1	2	3	Result	1	2	3	Result	Total
1st place, gold medalist(s)	Pawina Thongsuk (THA)	A	61.96	105	110	~~115~~	110	132	137	142	142	252
2nd place, silver medalist(s)	Ouyang Xiaofang (CHN)	A	62.37	110	~~115~~	115	115	132	~~137~~	~~137~~	132	247
3rd place, bronze medalist(s)	Thaw Yae Faw (MYA)	A	59.80	95	100	~~103~~	100	120	125	127	127	227
4	Nguyễn Thị Thiết (VIE)	A	62.77	98	101	102	102	120	123	~~125~~	123	225
5	Kim Soo-kyung (KOR)	A	62.68	93	~~96~~	~~97~~	93	121	~~128~~	~~128~~	121	214
6	Lu Ying-chi (TPE)	A	62.97	92	~~95~~	~~95~~	92	120	~~125~~	—	120	212
7	Irina Nekrassova (KAZ)	A	62.62	90	95	~~98~~	95	115	~~120~~	~~120~~	115	210

== New records ==
The following records were established during the competition.

Snatch	110	Ouyang Xiaofang (CHN)	GR
Snatch	115	Ouyang Xiaofang (CHN)	GR
Clean & Jerk	137	Pawina Thongsuk (THA)	GR
Clean & Jerk	142	Pawina Thongsuk (THA)	WR
Total	242	Pawina Thongsuk (THA)	GR
Total	247	Ouyang Xiaofang (CHN)	GR
Total	252	Pawina Thongsuk (THA)	GR
