= Sepak takraw at the 2006 Asian Games – Women's doubles =

Women's doubles at the 2006 Asian Games
- Venue: Al-Sadd Indoor Hall
- Date: 11–13 December 2006
- Competitors: 24 from 8 nations

Medalists
gold medal	Vietnam
silver medal	Myanmar
bronze medal	Japan
bronze medal	China

The women's double regu sepak takraw competition at the 2006 Asian Games in Doha was held from 11 December to 13 December at the Al-Sadd Indoor Hall.

== Squads ==
China	India	Japan	Myanmar
Sun Xiaodan; Wang Xiaohua; Wang Jianshuang	Meri Devi Moirangthem; Aruna Devi Mutum; Rasheshwari Devi Elangbam	Sawa Aoki; Chiharu Oku; Mari Nakagawa	Kyu Kyu Thin; May Zin Phyoe; Khin Aye Maw
Philippines	South Korea	Thailand	Vietnam
Deseree Autor; Irene Apdon; Jean Rose Babilonia	Lee Myung-eun; Yu Yeong-sim; Kim Mi-jeong	Waree Nantasing; Sirinapa Pornnongsan; Narumol Soda	Nguyễn Đức Thu Hiền; Lưu Thị Thanh; Nguyễn Hải Thảo

== Results ==
All times are Arabia Standard Time (UTC+03:00)

=== Preliminary ===
==== Group X ====
Pos	Team	Pld	W	L	SF	SA	SD	Pts	Qualification
1	Vietnam	3	3	0	6	2	+4	6	Semifinals
2	China	3	2	1	5	3	+2	4	Semifinals
3	Thailand	3	1	2	4	4	0	2	
4	Philippines	3	0	3	0	6	−6	0	

Source: Official website

Date	Time		Score		Set 1	Set 2	Set 3
11 Dec	09:00	Thailand	2–0	Philippines	21–11	21–9	
11 Dec	10:00	Vietnam	2–1	China	20–22	21–15	16–14
11 Dec	18:00	Thailand	1–2	China	21–18	17–21	12–15
11 Dec	19:00	Vietnam	2–0	Philippines	21–14	21–11	
12 Dec	10:00	Philippines	0–2	China	10–21	6–21	
12 Dec	14:00	Thailand	1–2	Vietnam	21–17	16–21	13–15

==== Group Y ====
Pos	Team	Pld	W	L	SF	SA	SD	Pts	Qualification
1	Myanmar	3	3	0	6	1	+5	6	Semifinals
2	Japan	3	2	1	5	3	+2	4	Semifinals
3	South Korea	3	1	2	3	4	−1	2	
4	India	3	0	3	0	6	−6	0	

Source: Official website

Date	Time		Score		Set 1	Set 2	Set 3
11 Dec	14:00	Japan	2–0	India	21–10	21–9	
11 Dec	15:00	Myanmar	2–0	South Korea	21–10	21–14	
11 Dec	18:00	Japan	2–1	South Korea	21–16	15–21	15–10
11 Dec	19:00	Myanmar	2–0	India	21–10	21–10	
12 Dec	09:00	India	0–2	South Korea	14–21	8–21	
12 Dec	15:00	Japan	1–2	Myanmar	22–24	23–21	14–16

=== Knockout round ===
Semifinals
13 December
Vietnam	2
Japan	1
13 December
Myanmar	2
China	1

Final
13 December
Vietnam	2
Myanmar	0

==== Semifinals ====
Date	Time		Score		Set 1	Set 2	Set 3
13 Dec	09:00	Vietnam	2–1	Japan	19–21	21–18	15–13
13 Dec	10:00	Myanmar	2–1	China	21–16	12–21	15–11

==== Final ====
Date	Time		Score		Set 1	Set 2	Set 3
13 Dec	16:00	Vietnam	2–0	Myanmar	21–16	21–16	
