= Myanmar at the 2006 Asian Games =

- IOC code: MYA
- NOC: Myanmar Olympic Committee

in Doha 1–5 December
- Medals Ranked 27th: Gold 0 Silver 4 Bronze 7 Total 11

Asian Games appearances (overview)
- 1951; 1954; 1958; 1962; 1966; 1970; 1974; 1978; 1982; 1986; 1990; 1994; 1998; 2002; 2006; 2010; 2014; 2018; 2022; 2026

Myanmar participated at the 2006 Asian Games, held in Doha, Qatar from December 1 to December 15, 2006, ranked 27th in the medal tally.

== Medalists ==
Medal	Name	Sport	Event	Date
Silver	Yar Thet Pan	Weightlifting	Women's 69 kg	4
Silver	Aung San Oo; Kyaw Oo	Cue sports	Men's English billiards doubles	7
Silver	Zaw Latt; Aung Cho Myint; Si Thu Lin	Sepak takraw	Men's doubles	13
Silver	Kyu Kyu Thin; May Zin Phyoe; Khin Aye Maw	Sepak takraw	Women's doubles	13
Bronze	Thaw Yae Faw	Weightlifting	Women's 63 kg	4
Bronze	Thein Zaw Min; Yazar Tun; Zaw Latt; Oaka Soe; Zaw Zaw Aung; Aung Cho Myint; Sithu Linn; Aung Myo Swe; Kyaw Thi Ha Oo; Zaw Zaw Aung; Tun Tun Naing	Sepak takraw	Men's team regu	6
Bronze	Yazar Tun; Zaw Latt; Oaka Soe; Aung Cho Myint; Zaw Zaw Aung	Sepak takraw	Men's regu	10
Bronze	Kyu Kyu Thin; May Zin Phyoe; Naing Naing Win; Khin Aye Maw	Sepak takraw	Women's regu	10
Bronze	Nay La Kyaw; Min Min	Sailing	Boys' 420	13
Bronze	Su Sandar Wai; Zin April Aung	Sailing	Girls' 420	13
Bronze	Aung Si Thu	Wushu	Men's changquan	14
