= 2006 Asian Games =

Multi-sport event in Doha, Qatar

Coordinates: 25.26496°N 51.45061°E

XV Asian Games
- Host city: Doha, Qatar
- Motto: The Games of Your Life (Note: Only an English motto was used during the Games. There is no Arabic equivalent of the motto adopted.)
- Nations: 45
- Athletes: 9,520
- Events: 424 in 39 sports (46 disciplines)
- Opening: December 1
- Closing: December 15
- Opened by: Hamad bin Khalifa Al Thani; Emir of Qatar
- Closed by: Ahmad Al-Fahad Al-Sabah; President of the Olympic Council of Asia
- Athlete's Oath: Mubarak Eid Bilal
- Judge's Oath: Abd Allah Al-Bulooshi
- Torch lighter: Mohammed bin Hamad bin Khalifa Al Thani
- Main venue: Khalifa International Stadium
- Website: doha-2006.com (archived)

Summer

Winter

The 2006 Asian Games (Arabic: دورة الألعاب الآسيوية 2006, romanized: Dawrat al-ʼAl‘ab al-Asīawīah 2006), officially known as the XV Asiad or 15th Asian Games (Arabic: دورة الألعاب الآسيوية الخامسة عشرة, and commonly known as Doha 2006 (Arabic: الدوحة 2006), were an Asian multi-sport event held in Doha, Qatar, from December 1 to 15, 2006, with 424 events in 39 sports featured in the games. Doha was the first city in its region and only the second in West Asia (following Tehran in 1974) to host the games. The city will host the games again in 2030.

It was the first time that all 45 member nations of the Olympic Council of Asia took part in this event. Also, Eurosport broadcast the event, marking the first time that the event was broadcast outside the continent. 21 competition venues were used for the Games including the newly constructed Aspire Indoor Sports Complex. The opening and closing ceremonies of the Games were held at Khalifa International Stadium. The trampoline discipline of gymnastics, as well as chess and triathlon made their debut at the Games.

The final medal tally was led by China, followed by South Korea and Japan. Qatar finished in ninth place. Tajikistan, Jordan and United Arab Emirates won their first ever Asian Games gold medals. 7 world and 23 Asian records were broken during the games, while South Korean swimmer Park Tae-hwan was announced as the most valuable player.

== Bidding process ==
Doha, Hong Kong, Kuala Lumpur and New Delhi submitted their formal bids by the deadline 30 June 2000. Prior to the voting, evaluation committee of the OCA, headed by the then vice-president of the association Muhammad Latif Butt inspected Doha on 13 and 14 July 2000, New Delhi on 15 and 16 July 2000, Kuala Lumpur on 17 and 18 July 2000, and Hong Kong on 19 and 20 July 2000.

On November 12, 2000, voting for the 2006 venue took place during the 19th Olympic Council of Asia (OCA) General Assembly held in Busan, South Korea. The voting involved the 41 members of the Olympic Council of Asia and consisted of three rounds, each round eliminating one of the bidding cities. After the first round, New Delhi was eliminated, with only two votes. The second round of voting, with three remaining candidates, gave Doha as the result.

2006 Asian Games bidding results
City	NOC	Round 1	Round 2
Doha	Qatar	20	22
Kuala Lumpur	Malaysia	13	13
Hong Kong	Hong Kong	6	6
New Delhi	India	2	−

Under the regulations of the OCA, a candidate which gains more than half of the available votes (at least 21 out of 41 votes) will automatically be selected as the host, and the remaining rounds of voting will be cancelled. When Doha gained 22 out of 41 votes this meant they were selected to host the 2006 Asian Games. Most of Qatar's votes came from the unanimous support from West Asian countries.

After the major upset, Malaysia and Hong Kong, China expressed their disappointment. Malaysia said that the selection of Doha was ridiculous and that the selection of Doha was influenced by Qatar's economic wealth.

== Development and preparations ==
=== Costs ===
Qatar spent US$2.8 billion on preparing venues, including a major upgrade to the 50,000-seat Khalifa Stadium from its original 20,000-seat capacity and the construction of the Aspire indoor sports complex, the world's largest indoor multi-sports dome.

=== Volunteers ===
Volunteering programme of Doha 2006 Asian Games which began in July 2004 targeted 12,000 volunteers and over 30,000 applications were received. The volunteers wore a specific uniform and are grouped at the Uniform Distribution and Accreditation Centre at the Al-Gharafa SC.

=== Torch relay ===
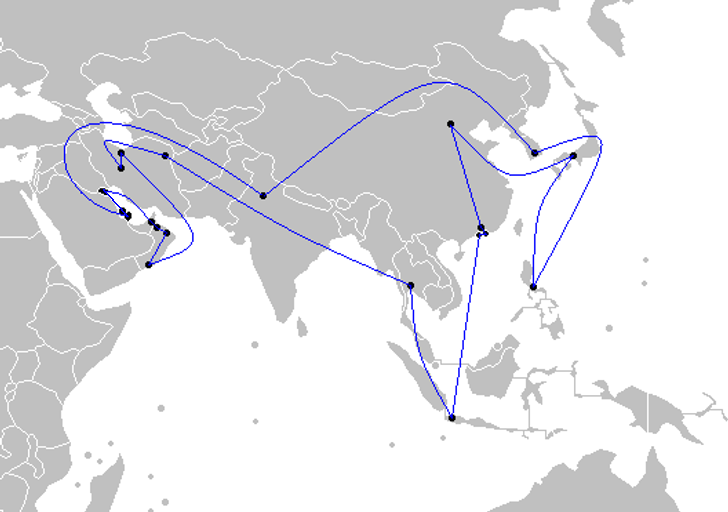
Route of the torch relay.

The torch relay has been integral to the Asian Games since 1958. The plans for the Doha 2006 torch relay were revealed by the Doha Asian Games Organising Committee on 20 January 2006. It engaged EFM Global Logistics to handle all the logistics for the relay.

The torch of the 2006 edition weighs 1.5 kilograms and is 72 centimetres tall. Its design was inspired by the curvaceous horns of the Arabian Oryx, featuring maroon and white colours which are the colours of the Qatari national flag. It symbolises the unifying spirit of competition and friendship throughout Asia.

The relay itself started on 8 October 2006 with a brief ceremony at the Doha Golf Club where the torch was lit with the theme of "Flame of Hospitality". With the involvement of over 3,000 people, the torch crossed eight former Asian Games host cities and the four Gulf Cooperation Council member states. The torch travelled back to Doha held by Sheikh Joan Bin Hamad Al-Thani, and the journey around the city itself started on 25 November 2006 and lasted until the opening ceremony of the Games. The first stop was in New Delhi, the birthplace of the Asian Games on 11 October 2006 where the torch's flame was fused together with the Eternal Asian Games Flame that burn at the Dhyan Chand National Stadium. During the fourth stop in Hiroshima on 21 October, the torch's flame was fused again but now with the Peace flame that burns at the Hiroshima Peace Memorial Park. In total the relay passed through 13 countries and 23 cities, visited several landmarks such as Taj Mahal and the Great Wall of China along its way to Qatar. The relay, which totaled a distance of 50,000 kilometres in 55 days, was until today, the longest in the history of the Asian Games.

=== Marketing ===
==== Emblem ====
Orry the oryx, the official mascot of the 2006 Asian Games

The emblem of the 15th Asian Games is an image of an athlete in motion which represents fearless manner of a sportsperson in face of challenges and obstacles. The colours used in the emblem represent Qatar's landscape. Yellow represents the crescent-shaped sand dunes of the desert, blue represents the calm sea of the Gulf and red represents the sun and warm spirit of Asia.

==== Mascot ====
An Arabian oryx named Orry served as the official mascot of the games. It was unveiled at the Doha waterfront on 1 January 2005 in conjunction with the start of the 700-day countdown to the games. He represents energy, determination, sportsmanship spirit, commitment, enthusiasm, participation, respect, peace and fun; he is also described as a great sportsman.

==== Medals ====
The medals of the games were designed by Dallah advertising and Gulf Media agency. Around 3,000 medals in gold, silver and bronze were made for the games. They featured Orry, the official Games mascot, as well as the Al Zubara Fort on the obverse and the official logo on the reverse.

==== Promotion ====
To promote the games, the organisers built a countdown clock and a giant statue of the official mascot, Orry, at the Doha Corniche. In addition, they also decorated the city with banners and 30 life-size versions of the mascot in a variety of different sporting poses. Touchscreen kiosks were set up at hotels, malls and businesses in the city to provide users with Qatar tourism and the games' information and details. On 3 April 2005, Qatar's flag carrier, Qatar Airways signed a US$10 million agreement with the Doha Asian Games Organising Committee (DAGOC) to become the event's official airline. The airline painted seven of its Airbus A330 in three distinct Asian Games liveries namely blue (3 aircraft), red (1 aircraft) and yellow (3 aircraft) and produced television commercials and a special 80-page guide on the sporting event in its in-flight magazine "Oryx" as part of its Global Advertising Campaign to promote the sporting event.

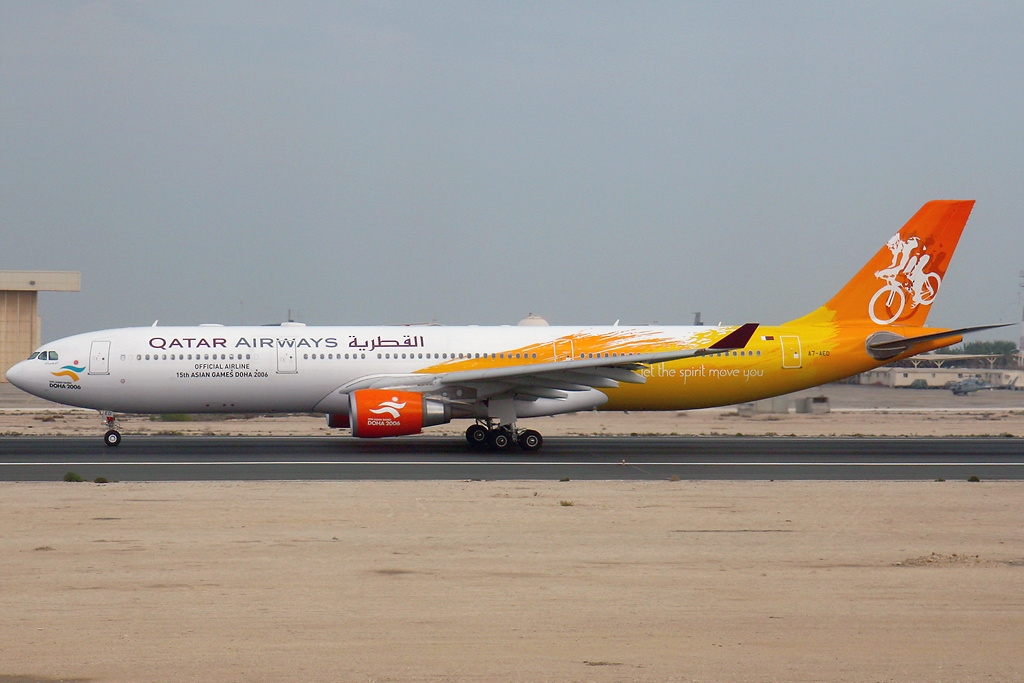
Qatar Airways Airbus A330-300 registration number A7-AED was painted in Asian Games yellow colour scheme across the fuselage, with the cyclist painted on the tail's port side and the athlete on the starboard side. Two sister ships A7-AEE and A7-AEF were also painted in this livery.

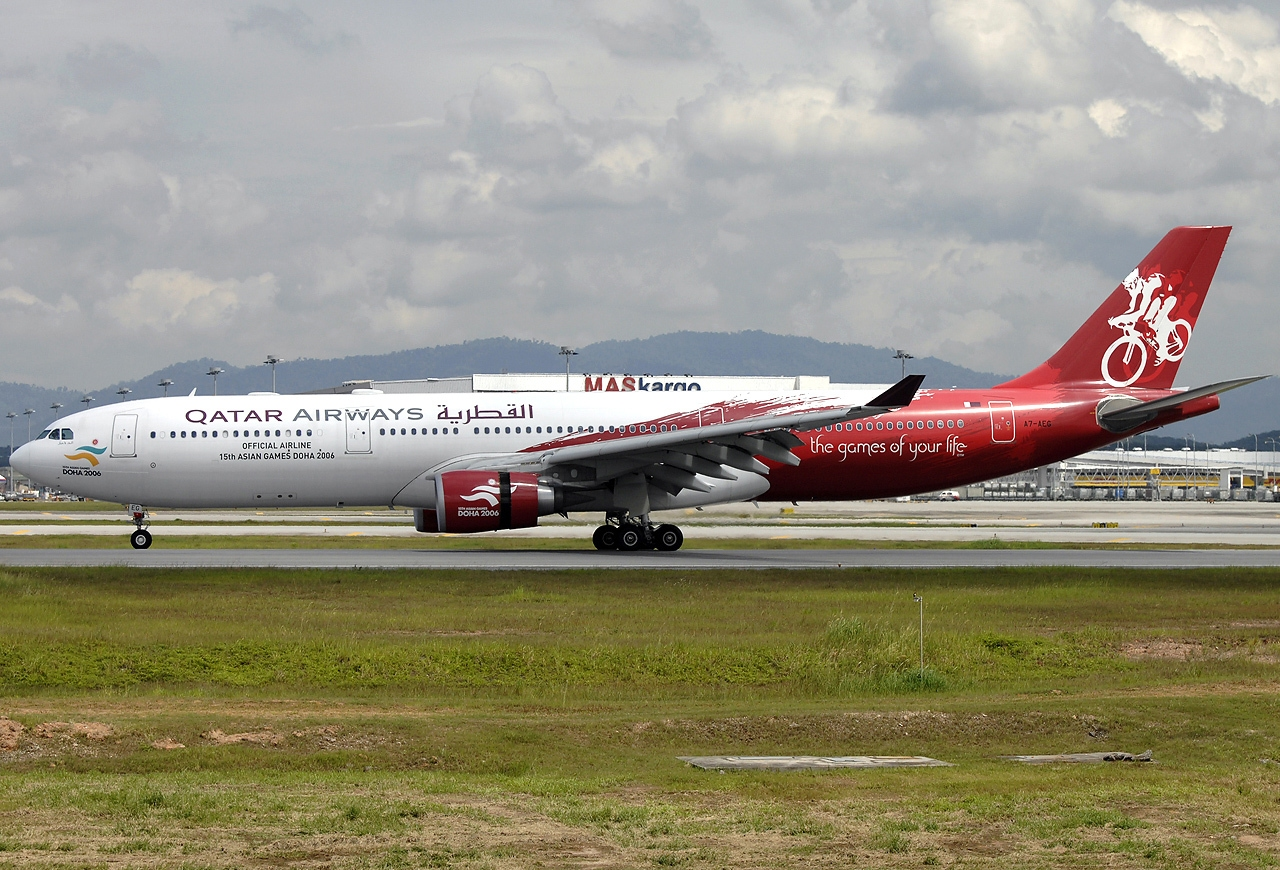
A7-AEG was the only Airbus A330-300 to spot the red colour scheme, although its livery design was similar to those with the yellow colour scheme.

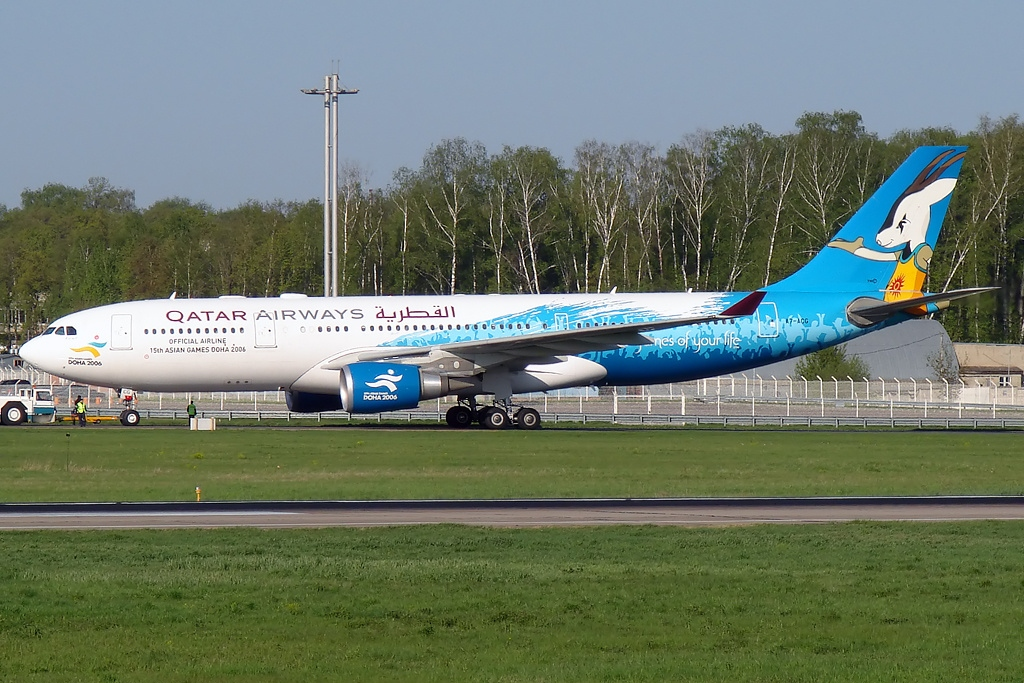
Qatar Airways Airbus A330-200 registration number A7-ACG was painted in Asian Games blue colour scheme across the fuselage, with the Asian Games mascot Orry the Oryx on both sides of its tail. Two sister ships A7-ACI and A7-AFP were also painted in this livery.

==== Merchandising ====
During the games, merchandises were sold at various locations in the city, including competition venues.

=== Venues ===
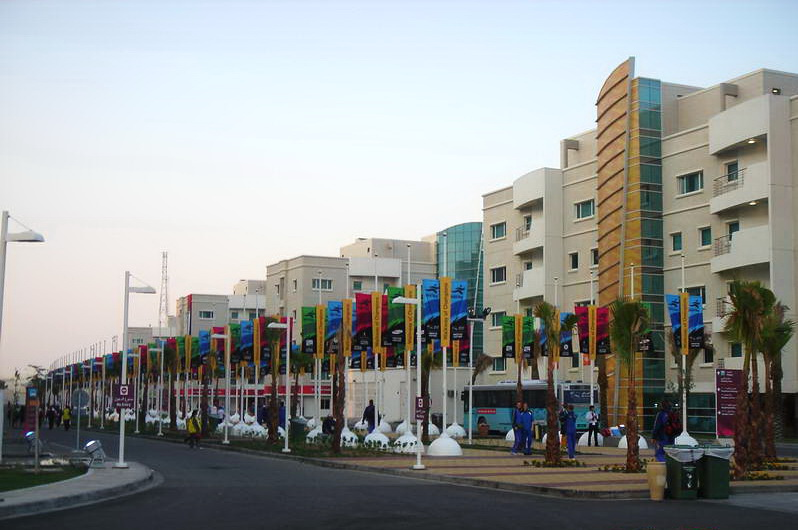
The Athletes' Village during the 2006 Asian Games

The Games used mostly new venues within the city. There were a total of 23 venues for the games, with 21 of them being competition venues and others being Main Media Centre and Athletes' village. After a major upgrade, Khalifa Stadium had a new running track, a new tensile fabric roof structure on its western seating and an arch on its east part. A temporary velodrome was built at Aspire Academy for track cycling events.

The Athletes’ Village was built on a 330,000 square metres site in the city centre, which had 32 residential buildings with 811 five-bedroom apartments for athletes and 45 for Chef-de-Missions and could accommodate 11,500 athletes and team officials.

=== Transport ===
Doha International Airport was expanded with the cost of US$1 billion in the run-up to the games to handle increasing air traffic volume and facilitate an estimated arrival of 10,500 athletes from 45 Asian countries, while Qatar's state-owned public transport service, the Qatar Transport Company (Mowasalat) provided bus, taxi and limousine services in the city to spectators, athletes, officials and volunteers during the games.

== The Games ==
=== Opening ceremony ===
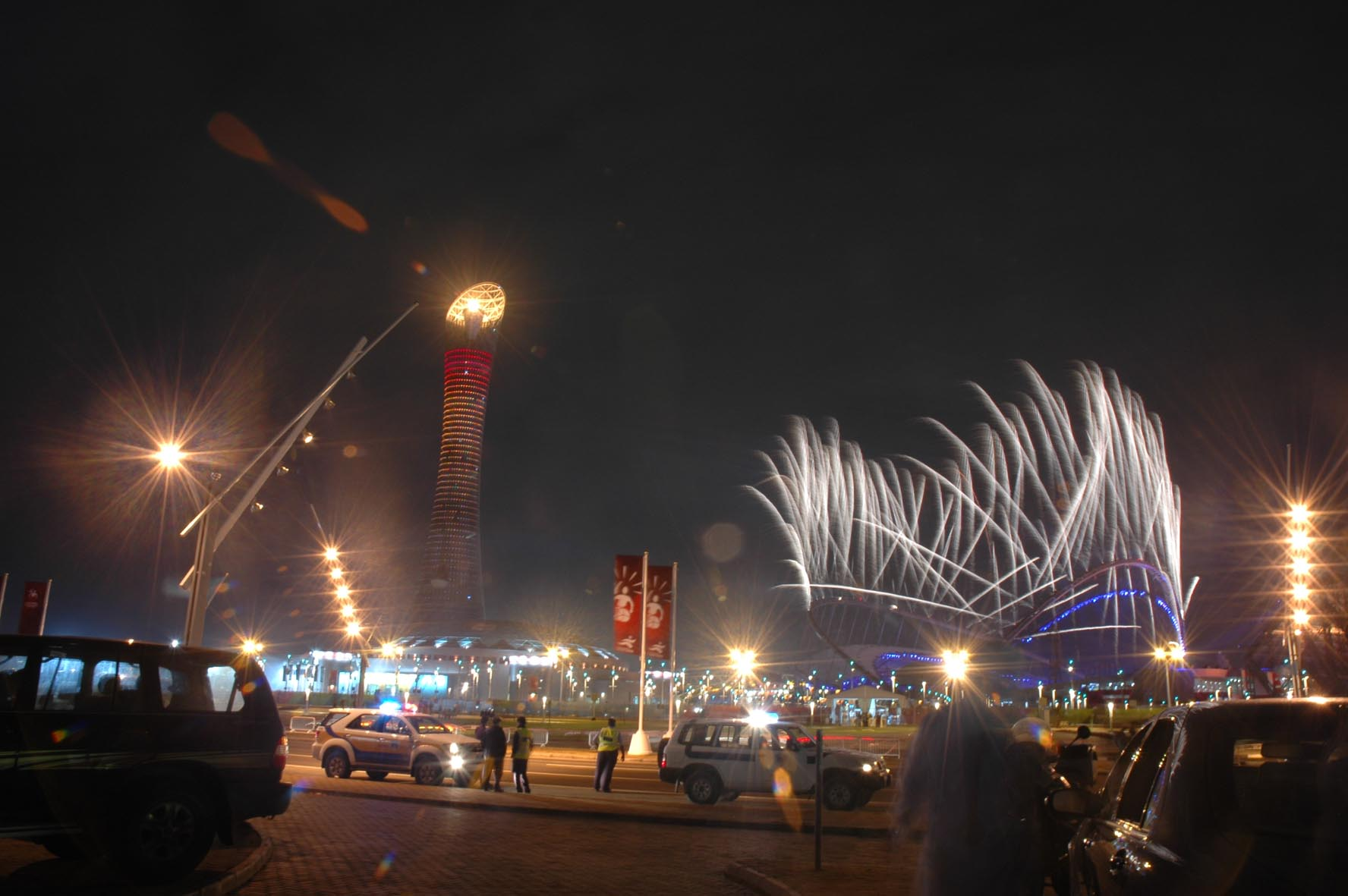
Fireworks display at the opening ceremony of the 15th Asian Games at the Khalifa Stadium in Doha with the Games' cauldron at the background

The opening ceremony was viewed by 50,000 spectators in the Khalifa International Stadium, including VIP guests like Jacques Rogge from the International Olympic Committee, Mahmoud Ahmadinejad from Iran, Ismail Haniyeh from Palestine and Bashar al-Assad from Syria. The opening ceremony was directed and produced by the Australian David Atkins, who also helmed the 2000 Summer Olympics opening ceremony in Sydney.

The opening ceremony showcased the importance of the culture of the Arab world in the history of Asia and referenced the region's contact with other Asian cultures. Several musical artists such as Hong Kong's Jacky Cheung, India's Bollywood star Sunidhi Chauhan, Lebanon's Majida El Roumi and Spanish tenor José Carreras performed at the ceremony. The ceremony ended with the lighting of the cauldron at the main stadium by Mohammed Bin Hamad Al-Thani, son of the emir and captain of the Qatar equestrian endurance team. At the same time, another cauldron was lit at the top of the Aspire Tower.

The games was officially opened by the Emir of Qatar, Sheikh Hamad bin Khalifa Al Thani.

=== Participating National Olympic Committees ===
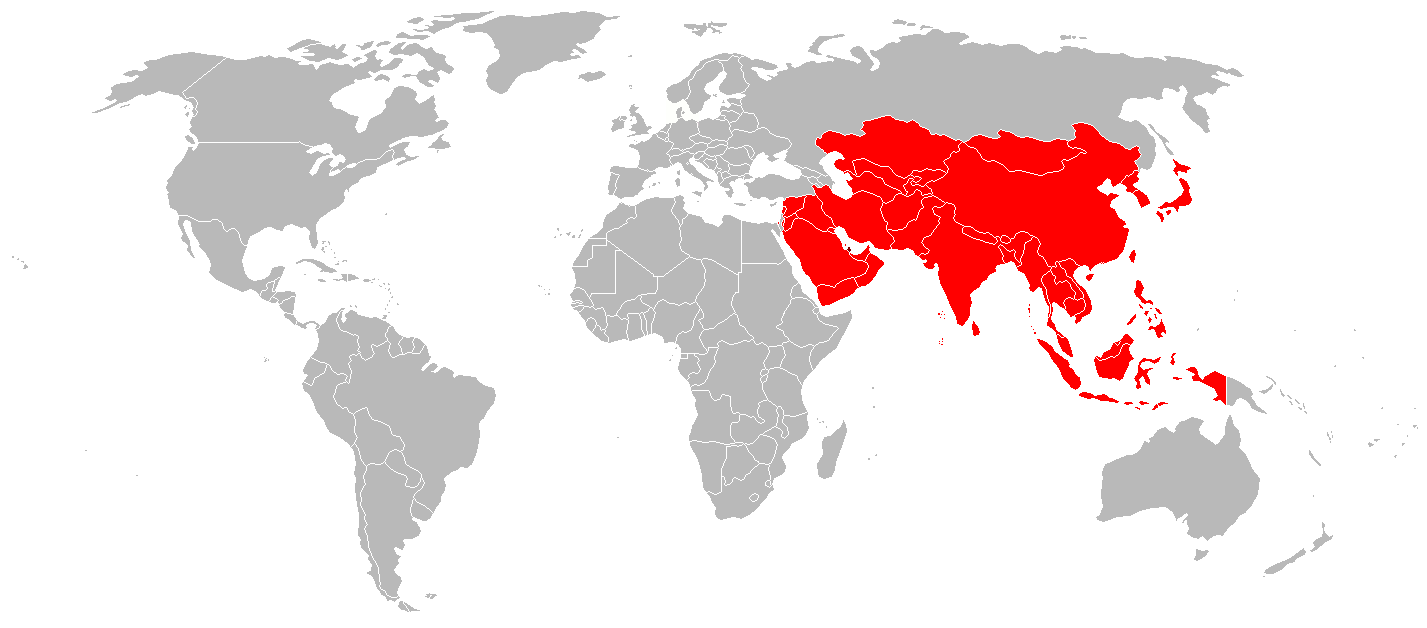
Participating countries.

All 45 OCA members participated in the Games, including Iraq which returned to compete after its suspension was lifted. Iraq last competed at the 1986 Asian Games and was suspended from 1990 until 2004 due to the Gulf War. The number in parentheses indicates the number of participants that the National Olympic Committee contributed.

Participating National Olympic Committees
- Afghanistan (47)
- Bahrain (21)
- Bangladesh (74)
- Bhutan (21)
- Brunei (7)
- Cambodia (17)
- China (647)
- Chinese Taipei (399)
- Hong Kong (282)
- India (387)
- Indonesia (140)
- Iran (239)
- Iraq (86)
- Japan (631)
- Jordan (98)
- Kazakhstan (338)
- Kuwait (238)
- Kyrgyzstan (131)
- Laos (15)
- Lebanon (132)
- Macau (203)
- Malaysia (244)
- Maldives (55)
- Mongolia (175)
- Myanmar (40)
- Nepal (51)
- North Korea (164)
- Oman (81)
- Pakistan (157)
- Palestine (72)
- Philippines (233)
- Qatar (359) (host)
- Saudi Arabia (155)
- Singapore (134)
- South Korea (656)
- Sri Lanka (151)
- Syria (155)
- Tajikistan (103)
- Thailand (378)
- Timor-Leste (15)
- Turkmenistan (43)
- United Arab Emirates (131)
- Uzbekistan (243)
- Vietnam (247)
- Yemen (24)

== Number of athletes by National Olympic Committees (by highest to lowest) ==
IOC Letter Code	Country	Athletes
KOR	South Korea	656
CHN	China	647
JPN	Japan	631
TPE	Chinese Taipei	399
IND	India	387
THA	Thailand	378
QAT	Qatar	359
KAZ	Kazakhstan	338
HKG	Hong Kong	282
VIE	Vietnam	247
MAS	Malaysia	244
UZB	Uzbekistan	243
IRI	Iran	239
KUW	Kuwait	238
PHI	Philippines	233
MAC	Macau	203
MGL	Mongolia	175
PRK	North Korea	164
PAK	Pakistan	157
KSA	Saudi Arabia	155
SYR	Syria	155
SRI	Sri Lanka	151
INA	Indonesia	140
SIN	Singapore	134
LIB	Lebanon	132
KGZ	Kyrgyzstan	131
UAE	United Arab Emirates	131
TJK	Tajikistan	103
JOR	Jordan	98
IRQ	Iraq	86
OMA	Oman	81
BAN	Bangladesh	74
PLE	Palestine	72
MDV	Maldives	55
NEP	Nepal	51
AFG	Afghanistan	47
TKM	Turkmenistan	43
MYA	Myanmar	40
YEM	Yemen	24
BRN	Bahrain	21
BHU	Bhutan	21
CAM	Cambodia	17
TLS	Timor-Leste	15
LAO	Laos	15
BRU	Brunei	7

=== Sports ===
The sport events contested at the 2006 Asian Games are listed below. Officially there are 46 disciplines from 39 sports in contention. All events listed started after the opening ceremony except badminton, baseball, basketball, football, table tennis, and volleyball, which had preliminaries before the opening ceremony. Trampoline discipline of gymnastics, and the sports of chess and triathlon made their debut at the event.

- Aquatics
  - Diving
  - Swimming
  - Synchronized swimming
  - Water polo
- Archery
- Athletics
- Badminton
- Baseball
- Basketball
- Bodybuilding
- Bowling
- Boxing
- Canoeing
- Chess
- Cue sports
- Cycling
  - Road cycling
  - Track cycling
- Equestrian
- Fencing
- Football
- Golf
- Gymnastics
  - Artistic gymnastics
  - Rhythmic gymnastics
  - Trampoline gymnastics
- Handball
- Field hockey
- Judo
- Kabaddi
- Karate
- Rowing
- Rugby sevens
- Sailing
- Sepak takraw
- Shooting
- Softball
- Soft tennis
- Squash
- Table tennis
- Taekwondo
- Tennis
- Triathlon
- Volleyball
  - Beach volleyball
  - Volleyball
- Weightlifting
- Wrestling
- Wushu

=== Calendar ===
In the following calendar for the 2006 Asian Games, each blue box represents an event competition, such as a qualification round, on that day. The yellow boxes represent days during which medal-awarding finals for a sport were held.

All times are in Arabia Standard Time (UTC+3)

OC	Opening ceremony	●	Event competitions	1	Gold medal events	CC	Closing ceremony

November / December		27th Mon	28th Tue	29th Wed	30th Thu	1st Fri	2nd Sat	3rd Sun	4th Mon	5th Tue	6th Wed	7th Thu	8th Fri	9th Sat	10th Sun	11th Mon	12th Tue	13th Wed	14th Thu	15th Fri	Events
Ceremonies						OC														CC	—N/a
Aquatics	Diving														2	2	2	2	2		51
Aquatics	Swimming						6	6	7	7	6	6									51
Aquatics	Synchronized swimming												1	1							51
Aquatics	Water polo										●	●	●	●	●		●	●	1		51
Archery														●	●	1	1	2			4
Athletics												2	4	10	10	9	10				45
Badminton					●		●	●	●	2	●	●	1	4							7
Baseball				●	●		●	●	●	●	●	1									1
Basketball					●		●	●	●	●	●	●	●	●	●	●	●	●	1	1	2
Bodybuilding													4	4							8
Bowling								2	2	●	2	●	4	●	2						12
Boxing							●	●	●	●	●	●	●	●	●	●	5	6			11
Canoeing															●	4		●	6		10
Chess							●	●	2		●	●	●	●	●	●	●	●	1		3
Cue sports									●	2	1	2	1	2	●	2					10
Cycling	Road cycling							1	1	2	1										17
Cycling	Track cycling													2	2	1	1	3	3		17
Equestrian									1	1	●	●	2		●	1	1		2		8
Fencing														2	2	2	2	2	2		12
Field hockey							●	●	●	●	●	●	●	●	●	●	●	1	1		2
Football			●	●	●		●	●	●	●	●	●		●	●		●	1	●	1	2
Golf													●	●	●	4					4
Gymnastics	Artistic						1	1	2	5	5										18
Gymnastics	Rhythmic													1	1						18
Gymnastics	Trampolining															●	2				18
Handball								●	●	●	●	●	●	●	●	●	●	1	1		2
Judo							4	4	4	4											16
Kabaddi							●	●	●	●	1										1
Karate																	6	7			13
Rowing								●	●	●	5	5									10
Rugby sevens															●	1					1
Sailing										●	●	●	●		●	3	5	6			14
Sepak takraw							●	●	●	●	2		●	●	2	●	●	2			6
Shooting							6	7	5	10	6	6	4								44
Soft tennis							●	2	1	●	2		2								7
Softball															●	●	●	●	1		1
Squash															●	●	●	●	2		2
Table tennis				●	●		●	2	●	●	2	3									7
Taekwondo												4	4	4	4						16
Tennis									●	●	●		2	●	●	●	●	3	2		7
Triathlon													2								2
Volleyball	Beach volleyball						●	●	●	●	●	●	●	●	●	2					4
Volleyball	Indoor volleyball	●	●		●		●	●	●	●	●	●	●	●	●	●	1	●	1		4
Weightlifting							3	3	3	3	3										15
Wrestling														3	4	4		3	4		18
Wushu																●	●	2	9		11
Daily medal events							20	28	28	36	36	29	31	33	29	36	36	41	39	2	424
Cummulative total							20	48	76	112	148	177	208	241	270	306	342	383	422	424	424
November / December		27th Mon	28th Tue	29th Wed	30th Thu	1st Fri	2nd Sat	3rd Sun	4th Mon	5th Tue	6th Wed	7th Thu	8th Fri	9th Sat	10th Sun	11th Mon	12th Tue	13th Wed	14th Thu	15th Fri	Gold medals

November		18th Sat	21st Tue	23rd Thu	24th Fri	26th Sun
Basketball				●	●	●
Football		●	●		●	
Volleyball	Indoor volleyball					●

=== Closing ceremony ===
The closing ceremony featured an homage to classic Middle Eastern stories and served as a continuation of the opening ceremony. The artistic programme starred the same young boy who played the "Seeker" in the opening ceremony. In the first segment, the boy flew on a magic carpet and entered a magical storybook world that paid tribute to the classic folktales of One Thousand and One Nights. This segment included references to stories featured in The Nights like Ali Baba and the Forty Thieves, Sinbad the Sailor and Aladdin and the Wonderful Lamp. An array of dancers, horses, and special effects were used to portray the different stories. In one scene, the games cauldron was extinguished when the magic carpet left the stadium. Afterwards, there was another segment called "Land of the Oryx" in which various dances were performed.

All 45 nations' athletes entered the stadium after the artistic programme was finished. South Korean swimmer, Park Tae-hwan was announced as the best athlete of the Games, having won seven medals, three of them being golds from the swimming competitions.

After that, the OCA President Sheikh Ahmad Al-Fahad Al-Sabah officially announced the Games closed. As per tradition, the Qatari Armed Forces personnel lowered the OCA flag, which would then be carried by the students of Aspire Academy out of the stadium. Later, the Chinese flag was raised to the Chinese National Anthem. Sheikh Ahmad then passed the OCA flag to the mayor of Guangzhou, Zhang Guangning, as the city was to be the next Asian Games host in 2010.

A special 10 minute handover segment called "Oriental Charm" was then presented to showcase Guangzhou as the next host city. This segment fused the traditional dances of China's performing arts with a modern setting. Afterwards, the theme song of the games, "Triumph of the One", was performed by Lea Salonga from the Philippines. The ceremony ended with a fireworks display that also marked the conclusion of the Games.

== Medal table ==
The top ten ranked NOCs at these Games are listed below. The host nation, Qatar, is highlighted.

* Host nation (Qatar)

Rank	NOC	Gold	Silver	Bronze	Total
1	China (CHN)	165	88	63	316
2	South Korea (KOR)	58	52	83	193
3	Japan (JPN)	50	72	78	200
4	Kazakhstan (KAZ)	23	20	42	85
5	Thailand (THA)	13	15	26	54
6	Iran (IRI)	11	15	22	48
7	Uzbekistan (UZB)	11	14	15	40
8	India (IND)	10	17	26	53
9	Qatar (QAT)*	9	12	11	32
10	Chinese Taipei (TPE)	9	10	27	46
11–38	Remaining	69	108	149	326
Totals (38 entries)		428	423	542	1,393

== Broadcasting ==
A joint venture between Host Broadcast Services and IMG Media named the Doha Asian Games Broadcast Services (DAGBS), now International Games Broadcast Services (IGBS), was set up in September 2004 and served as the games' host broadcaster after being appointed by the organiser the following month. It distributed 2,000 hours of the Games content to its international rights holders. The International Broadcast Centre was constructed in Qatar International Exhibition Centre (QIEC). Viewers in the European continent watch the event for the first time with Eurosport as the region's broadcaster.

== Controversies ==
=== Athlete's death ===
Kim Hyung Chil and Bundaberg Black prior to the accident.

South Korean equestrian athlete Kim Hyung-chil died after falling off his horse on the morning of December 7 during the cross country competition which took place in the rain. The accident occurred at jump number eight during the cross-country stage of the three-day eventing competition. After the horse, named Bundaberg Black, rolled over him, he was taken to Hamad General Hospital, with his death later confirmed by the organizing committee. Kim died at around 10.50 am, shortly before noon Qatar time. During the accident, he suffered from severe trauma to his head, neck and upper chest. Kim's horse suffered a serious injury during the fall and was euthanised after the accident.

According to South Korea National Olympic Committee president Kim Jung Kil, sources on the course said that the horse mistimed his jump in the wet conditions and slipped. South Korean officials are asking for an inquiry to determine if mismanagement or rain was the cause of the death.

"In my professional opinion, neither the weather nor the footing had any bearing on this accident. If the horse falls, it's like two tons of bricks falling on you. There is nothing you can do about it," said Andy Griffiths, the Games event's technical overseer. Christopher Hodson, vice president of the International Equestrian Federation, said the course was fit to ride when a full investigation into the accident was conducted.

Kim's father was an equestrian athlete for South Korea in the 1964 Summer Olympics in Tokyo and the younger Kim won a silver medal at the 2002 Asian Games in Busan on the same horse.

This is the eighth death linked to the 2006 Asian Games, and the first involving an athlete. The accident came four days after the road accident which killed Jagadammamdhu Sudanan Thampi, a 60-year-old female volunteer from India.

=== Criticism ===
Despite the opening ceremony, which received some high praise, there was some criticism by some delegations and athletes. Heavy rain poured down just after the end of opening ceremony, and many believed that the organizers did not have plans to deal with it, creating a chaotic situation. Chef de Mission of the Philippines, Butch Ramirez, said that some of the members of the Philippine delegation, including athletes, were soaked in the rain because the organising officials did not allow them to re-enter the covered stadium for shelter; instead they had to stay in the heavy rain for more than 30 minutes. He went on to say that the breakdown in transportation protocols due to the rain caused the athletes to rush to the nearest bus station, exposing them to rain. Ramirez said that he himself was a victim of pushing and shoving due to this chaos, and that because of it, he suffered from an asthma attack.

According to one IOC insider who arrived back at his hotel soaked, this incident hurt the chances of Doha hosting the 2016 Summer Olympics, which Doha applied for on 25 October 2007, and lost on 4 June 2008 when they were eliminated from the pool. Transportation was one of the crucial factors involved in the decision process. Doha would have its own metro system in 2019.

=== Persian Gulf naming dispute ===
In brochures published in the lead-up to the games, the Persian Gulf was referred to as the "Arabian Gulf". In response, Iranian state television accused the naming conventions to be influenced by a "Zionist" plot. Subsequently, Iran threatened to boycott the games if the brochures were not changed. The organizers relented and Iran competed.

=== Doping ===
The list of athletes who failed the doping test during the Games:

- Myanmar's Than Kyi Kyi, the 48 kilogram weightlifter, tested positive for a banned diuretic.
- Oo Mya Sanda, also of Myanmar, silver medalist for 75 kilogram weightlifting, tested positive for a metabolite.
- Uzbekistan's Elmira Ramileva, the 69 kilogram weightlifter, tested positive for an anabolic steroid.
- Alexander Urinov, also of Uzbekistan, the 105 kilograms weightlifter, tested positive for cannabis.
- Iraq's Saad Faeaz, a bodybuilder, disqualified from the Games after a banned steroid was found in his luggage in Doha International Airport.
- Bahrain's Sayed Faisal Husain, silver medalist for 70 kilogram bodybuilding tested positive.
- Korea's Kim Myong-Hun, silver medalist for 90 kilogram bodybuilding tested positive.

=== Gender test ===
- India's Santhi Soundarajan, silver medalist for women's 800 metre run, was officially stripped of her medal after she failed a gender test.

=== Bed shortage ===
The Games' organizers faced significant bed shortages due to the record number of more than 13,000 athletes and officials who attended the 2006 Games. The Athletes' Village had space for only 10,500 people and was not large enough to accommodate the record amount of attendees. To resolve the problem, organizers contracted with three cruise ships to provide sleeping quarters.

=== Last minute withdrawals ===
The Football competition lost three teams due to withdrawals and a suspension, which resulted rescheduling of the format and draws. Following the withdrawal of Maldives women's football team in early November, the women's football competition was forced to redraw to ensure both groups had an equal number of teams. Not much later, Turkmenistan announced their withdrawal due to the lack of options available in Qatar. Yemen also withdrew because the team was unable to afford a drug test after some of their players were accused of doping.

India made big changes to its team close to the opening ceremonies. On November 22, 2006, the Indian sports dropped eight of the 32 events they had previously announced that they would be contesting in the Games. The dropped events were basketball, handball, sepak takraw, triathlon, ten-pin bowling and rugby sevens. The events were dropped due to the lack of medal hopes and to cut costs. As a result, 387 athletes were sent to Doha instead of the original 589 proposed by the Indian Olympic Association.

While volleyball also had three teams withdraw from the Games, Palestine withdrew due to the travelling difficulties caused by the closure of the Gaza Strip border. Indonesia and Turkmenistan also withdrew from the tournament, for unknown reasons, just hours before their first preliminary round match.

== See also ==
- 2005 West Asian Games
- 2011 Pan Arab Games
- 2019 World Beach Games
- 2022 FIFA World Cup
- 2030 Asian Games

== Notes ==
Preceded by Busan	Asian Games; Doha; XV Asian Games (2006)	Succeeded by Guangzhou
