= February 2007 in sports =

<<	February 2007					>>
Su	Mo	Tu	We	Th	Fr	Sa
				1	2	3
4	5	6	7	8	9	10
11	12	13	14	15	16	17
18	19	20	21	22	23	24
25	26	27	28
Canada; Sports

This list shows notable sports-related deaths, events, and notable outcomes that occurred in February 2007.

== Deaths ==
- 24 – Damien Nash
- 22 – Dennis Johnson
- 9 – Hank Bauer
- 6 – Lew Burdette

== Sporting seasons ==
- Auto racing 2007:
  - A1 Grand Prix
  - NASCAR NEXTEL Cup
  - Busch Series
  - Craftsman Truck Series
  - World Rally Championship
  - V8 Supercar
- Basketball 2006–07:
  - Australian National Basketball League
  - Euroleague
  - National Basketball Association
  - NCAA Men's Basketball
  - Philippine Cup finals
  - ULEB Cup
- Cricket 2006–07:
  - Australia
  - South Africa
- Football (soccer) 2006–07:
  - 2006–07 UEFA Champions League
  - 2006–07 UEFA Cup
  - England (general)
    - FA Premier League 2006–07
  - Scotland (general)
    - Scottish Premier League 2006–07
  - Argentina
- Golf:
  - 2007 PGA Tour
  - 2007 European Tour
  - 2007 LPGA Tour
- Ice hockey 2006–07:
  - National Hockey League
- Rugby league 2007:
  - Super League XII
- Rugby union 2007:
  - 2007 Six Nations Championship
  - 2007 Super 14 season
  - 2006–07 Heineken Cup
  - 2006–07 English Premiership
  - 2006–07 Top 14
  - 2006–07 Celtic League
  - 2007 Rugby World Cup qualifying
  - 2006–07 IRB Sevens
- Speed skating 2006–07:
  - Essent Cup 2006–07
  - World Cup
- Speedway:
  - Speedway Grand Prix
- Volleyball 2007:
  - Men's CEV Champions League 2006–07
  - Women's CEV Champions League 2006–07

== 28 February 2007 (Wednesday) ==
- Auto racing:
  - At a test for NASCAR's Car of Tomorrow in Bristol, Tennessee, the sanctioning body announces they will consider making the unibody template mandatory starting a year earlier than planned.
- US men's college basketball:
  - (15) Texas 98, (7) Texas A&M 96 (2 OT)
  - (24) Maryland 85, (14) Duke 77
- Cricket:
  - Tri-Nations series in St. John's, Antigua:
    - Bangladesh 278/5 (50 ov) beat Canada 265/7 (50.0 ov) by 13 runs and wins the tournament.

== 27 February 2007 (Tuesday) ==
- Baseball:
  - For the third consecutive election cycle, the Veterans Committee of the United States Baseball Hall of Fame fails to elect any nominees.
- US men's college basketball:
  - Tennessee 86, (5) Florida 76.
    Almost as notable as Tennessee's upset win was a special appearance by Lady Vols head coach Pat Summitt. After Tennessee men's head coach Bruce Pearl painted his chest orange for a key Lady Vols game earlier in the season against No. 1 Duke, Summitt returns the favor by dressing in a cheerleader outfit and helping the Tennessee cheerleaders lead cheers during the first media timeout.
  - BYU 62, (25) Air Force 58

== 26 February 2007 (Monday) ==
- US men's college basketball:
  - (3) Kansas 67, Oklahoma 65.
  - Syracuse 72, (9) Georgetown 58.
- Indoor football:
  - Javon Camon, a defensive back for the Daytona Beach Thunder of the World Indoor Football League, dies after sustaining an injury during a head-to-head hit with Juval Winston of the Columbus Lions. He was 25.
- Cricket:
  - Tri-Nations series in St. John's, Antigua:
    - Canada 207/7 (44 ov) beat Bermuda 206/8 (50 ov) by 3 wickets (with 36 balls remaining).

== 25 February 2007 (Sunday) ==
- Cricket:
  - Tri-Nations series in St. John's, Antigua:
    - Bangladesh 206/2 (37.3 ov) def Bermuda 205/8 (50 ov) by 8 wickets

(with 75 balls remaining).

- Football (soccer): Carling Cup Final:
  - Chelsea 2–1 Arsenal.
- Auto racing:
  - NASCAR NEXTEL Cup Auto Club 500 at Fontana, California:
    (1) Matt Kenseth (2) Jeff Gordon (3) Jimmie Johnson
    Kenseth sweeps two of the three races at California, having won the Busch Series race one day earlier.
- Tennis:
  - 2007 ATP Tour:
    - World Tennis Tournament in Rotterdam, Netherlands:
      Final: (Russia) Mikhail Youzhny def (Croatia) (3) Ivan Ljubičić 6–2 6–4.
    - M.K. Championships in Memphis, United States:
      Final: (Germany) (2) Tommy Haas def (1) Andy Roddick 6–3 6–2.
    - Copa Telmex in Buenos Aires, Argentina:
      Final: Juan Mónaco def (Italy) Alessio di Mauro 6–1 6–2.
  - 2007 WTA Tour:
    - Copa Colsanitas in Bogotá, Colombia:
      Final: (Italy) (6) Roberta Vinci def (Italy) (1) Tathiana Garbin 6–7(4) 6–4 0–3 (Garbin retired due to ankle injury).
- Rugby union:
  - The Sunday Times reports that the sport's governing body, the International Rugby Board, has been brokering a deal that could see Argentina admitted to the Southern Hemisphere Tri Nations competition as early as 2008.
- US college basketball:
  - Men's
    - (1 Coaches Poll) Ohio State 49, (1 AP) Wisconsin 48
    - Maryland 89, (5) North Carolina 87
    - (7) Memphis 77, Houston 64
  - Women's
    - (1) Duke 67, (4) North Carolina 62. The Blue Devils complete the first unbeaten regular season by a women's team in ACC history in front of their home fans.

== 24 February 2007 (Saturday) ==
- Rugby union:
  - Six Nations:
    - Scotland 17 – 37 Italy
      - Italy win their first-ever away match since joining the Six Nations in 2000, starting with three converted tries in the first six minutes.
    - Ireland 43 – 13 England
      - England's worst-ever defeat by Ireland, in the first match they have ever played at Croke Park.
    - France 32 – 21 Wales
      - France came from behind to beat the Welsh Dragons to top the Pool and be the only team without a loss and strengthening their chances of winning the Six Nations
- US men's college basketball:
  - LSU 66, (3) Florida 56
  - (4) UCLA 75, Stanford 61
  - (6) Kansas 89, Iowa State 52
  - (8) Texas A&M 97, Baylor 87
  - (9) Washington State 58, Oregon State 54
  - (12) Georgetown 61, (10) Pittsburgh 53
  - TCU 71, (14) Air Force 66
  - Notre Dame 85, (16) Marquette 73
  - San Diego State 86, (21) BYU 74
  - Auburn 86, (25) Alabama 77
- Tennis:
  - 2007 WTA Tour:
    - Dubai Tennis Championships in Dubai, UAE:
      Final: (Belgium) (1) Justine Henin def (France) (2) Amélie Mauresmo 6–4 7–5.
    - M.K. Championships in Memphis, Tennessee, United States:
      Final: (7) Venus Williams def (Israel) (1) Shahar Pe'er 6–1 6–1.
- Lacrosse:
  - In their first game since the heavily publicized rape allegations that scuttled their 2006 season, Duke win 17–11 at home over Dartmouth. (ESPN)

== 23 February 2007 (Friday) ==
- 2007 Canada Games in Whitehorse, Yukon, Canada.
  - Opening Ceremonies.
- Basketball: 2006–07 Philippine Basketball Association Philippine Cup finals game 6 – Barangay Ginebra Kings 96, San Miguel Beermen 94. Kings win series 4–2 with Finals MVP Jayjay Helterbrand converting clutch freethrows with 2 seconds remaining. Ginebra wins seventh league championship. Game was held at the Araneta Coliseum.

== 22 February 2007 (Thursday) ==
- FIS Nordic World Ski Championships 2007 in Sapporo, Japan
  - Men's individual sprint:
    (gold) – Jens Arne Svartedal (Norway) , (silver) – Mats Larsson (Sweden) , (bronze) – Eldar Rønning (Norway) .
  - Women's individual sprint:
    (gold) – Astrid Jacobsen (Norway) , (silver) – Petra Majdič (Slovenia) , (bronze) – Virpi Kuitunen (Finland) .
- Football (soccer): 2006–07 UEFA Cup Round of 32, second leg, progressing teams shown in **bold**.
  - **Newcastle United** 1–0 Zulte-Waregem (4–1 aggregate)
  - Parma 0–1 **Sporting Braga** (0–2 aggregate)
  - Panathinaikos 0–0 **Lens** (1–3 aggregate)
  - Blackburn Rovers 0–0 **Bayer Leverkusen** (2–3 aggregate)
  - **Rangers** 4–0 Hapoel Tel Aviv (5–2 aggregate)
  - **Espanyol** 2–0 Livorno (4–2 aggregate)
  - **AZ Alkmaar** 2–2 Fenerbahçe (5–5 aggregate; AZ moves to the Round of 16 on away goals)
  - Ajax 3–1 **Werder Bremen** (3–4 aggregate)
  - **Celta Vigo** 2–1 Spartak Moscow (3–2 aggregate)
  - **Maccabi Haifa** 1–0 CSKA Moscow (1–0 aggregate)
  - **Paris Saint-Germain** 2–0 AEK Athens (4–0 aggregate)
  - Dinamo Bucharest 1–2 **Benfica** (3–1 aggregate)
  - **Sevilla** 1–0 Steaua Bucharest (3–0 aggregate)
  - Nancy 0–1 **Shakhtar Donetsk** (1–2 aggregate)
  - **Osasuna** 1–0 (aet) Bordeaux (1–0 aggregate)
  - NOTE: Tottenham Hotspur received a bye due to Feyenoord's expulsion from the competition due to crowd misbehavior in the last group stage match.
- US college basketball:
  - Men's:
    - (4) UCLA 85, California 75
    - (7) Memphis 99, Rice 63
    - (23) Oregon 64, (9) Washington State 59
    - Loyola (Chicago) 75, (15) Butler 71
  - Women's:
    - In the longest game in NCAA women's basketball history, Drexel defeats Northeastern 98–90 in five overtimes. (AP/Yahoo!)
- Ice hockey (NHL):
  - A late hit on Buffalo Sabres co-captain Chris Drury leads to a huge fight between them and the Ottawa Senators. At some point or another, all twelve players on the ice were fighting. A total of 100 penalty minutes were dispensed against eight different players, including five game misconducts. Three Sabres and two Senators were ejected, including both teams' goalies. The Sabres ultimately won the game, 6–5 in a shootout. (ESPN)
  - That shootout was one of an NHL single-night record eight overtime games, and one of four shootouts.

== 21 February 2007 (Wednesday) ==
- Football (soccer):
  - UEFA Champions League, Last-16 stage, first leg: (UEFA.com)
    - Porto 1 – 1 Chelsea
    - Roma 0 – 0 Lyon
    - Barcelona 1 – 2 Liverpool
    - Inter Milan 2 – 2 Valencia
- Basketball:
  - International basketball: The International Basketball Federation lifts the Philippines' suspension as it recognizes the new basketball federation. (FIBA.com)
  - US men's college basketball:
    - (2) Ohio State 68, Penn State 60
    - (3) Florida 63, South Carolina 49
    - (5) North Carolina 83, NC State 64
    - (8) Texas A&M 66, Oklahoma State 46
    - Mississippi State 83, (17) Vanderbilt 70
    - Miami (FL) 68, (24) Virginia 60
    - Tennessee 69, (25) Alabama 66 (OT)
  - 2006–07 Philippine Basketball Association Philippine Cup finals game 5: Barangay Ginebra Kings 94, San Miguel Beermen 82. Kings lead series 3–2. Game was held at the Araneta Coliseum.

== 20 February 2007 (Tuesday) ==
- Boxing:
  - Tommy Morrison, who was banned from the sport in 1996 for a positive HIV test, is cleared to return to the ring by the West Virginia Athletic Commission after several HIV tests over the past two months come back negative. He claims the test in 1996 was a false positive, and he never had HIV. He defeated John Castle in Indianapolis via a second round technical knockout on 22 February.
- Football (soccer):
  - UEFA Champions League, Last-16 stage, first leg (UEFA.com):
    - Celtic 0 – 0 A.C. Milan
    - PSV Eindhoven 1 – 0 Arsenal
    - Lille 0 – 1 Manchester United
    - Real Madrid 3 – 2 Bayern Munich
- US men's college basketball:
  - Michigan State 64, (1) Wisconsin 55. The Badgers lose their first game after assuming the top spot in the AP poll.
  - UNLV 60, (14) Air Force 50
  - Providence 64, (22) West Virginia 61
- Cricket:
  - 2006–07 Chappell–Hadlee Trophy, 3rd ODI in Hamilton:
    - New Zealand 350/9 (49.3 overs) beat Australia 346/5 (50 overs) by 1 wicket (with 3 balls remaining). New Zealand win the series 3–0.

== 19 February 2007 (Monday) ==
- American football:
  - The NFL's San Diego Chargers name former San Francisco 49ers offensive coordinator Norv Turner as their new head coach. This is Turner's third head coaching job, having previously coached the Oakland Raiders and Washington Redskins.
- US men's college basketball:
  - (6) Kansas 71, Kansas State 62
  - (10) Pittsburgh 71, Seton Hall 68

== 18 February 2007 (Sunday) ==
- Auto racing:
  - NASCAR NEXTEL Cup Daytona 500 in Daytona Beach, Florida.

(1) Kevin Harvick, (2) Mark Martin, (3) Jeff Burton, (4) Mike Wallace, (5) David Ragan.

Harvick edges Martin by .020 seconds in the closest finish since Lee Petty won the inaugural event in 1959 as a crash in back of the two leaders scrambles the top ten.

- Basketball:
  - 2007 NBA All-Star Game in Las Vegas, Nevada.
    - West All-Stars 153, East All-Stars 132. Kobe Bryant of the Los Angeles Lakers scores 32 points and earns the game's Most Valuable Player Award in the first NBA-sanctioned All-Star Game played in a city without an NBA franchise.
  - US men's college basketball:
    - (3) Ohio State 85, Minnesota 67
    - Arizona State 68, (22) USC 58
- Football (soccer):
  - UNCAF Nations Cup 2007 in El Salvador:
    - Final: Costa Rica 1 Panama 1 (4:1 in penalty shootout).
    - Third place: Guatemala 1 El Salvador 0.
- Tennis:
  - 2007 ATP Tour:
    - Open 13 in Marseille, France:
      Final: Gilles Simon def (7) Marcos Baghdatis (Cyprus) 6–4 7–6(3).
    - Brasil Open in Costa do Sauípe, Brazil:
      Final: Guillermo Cañas (Argentina) def (1) Juan Carlos Ferrero (Spain) 7–6(4) 6–2.
    - SAP Open in San Jose, California, USA:
      Final: (3) Andy Murray (United Kingdom) def Ivo Karlović (Croatia) 6–7(3) 6–4 7–6(2).
  - 2007 WTA Tour:
    - Proximus Diamond Games in Antwerp, Belgium:
      Final: (1) Amélie Mauresmo (France) def (2) Kim Clijsters 6–4 7–6(4).
    - Sony Ericsson International in Bangalore, India:
      Final: Yaroslava Shvedova (Russia) def (1) Mara Santangelo (Italy) 6–4 6–4.
- Cricket:
  - 2006–07 Chappell–Hadlee Trophy, 2nd ODI in Auckland:
    - New Zealand 337/5 (48.4 ov) beat Australia 336/4 (50 ov) by 5 wickets (with 8 balls remaining). New Zealand lead the 3-match series 2–0.

== 17 February 2007 (Saturday) ==
- Basketball:
  - 2007 NBA All-Star Saturday Night: Yahoo! Sports
    - Shooting Stars: Team Detroit (Chauncey Billups, Swin Cash, Bill Laimbeer) def. Team Chicago (Ben Gordon, Candice Dupree, Scottie Pippen) via disqualification when Gordon shoots out of turn.
    - Skills Challenge: Dwyane Wade (Miami Heat, 26.4 seconds) def. Kobe Bryant (Los Angeles Lakers, 45.8 seconds)
    - Race for Charity: Charles Barkley def. Dick Bavetta with a time of 25.7 seconds.
    - Three-Point Shootout: Jason Kapono (Miami Heat, 24 pts.) def. Gilbert Arenas (Washington Wizards, 17 pts.) and Dirk Nowitzki (Dallas Mavericks, 9 pts.).
    - Slam Dunk Competition: Gerald Green (Boston Celtics, 91 points) def. Nate Robinson (New York Knicks, 80 pts.).
  - US men's college basketball:
    - Vanderbilt 83, (1) Florida 70. The Commodores upset the Gators in Nashville, ending Florida's 17-game winning streak.
    - (3) Wisconsin 75, Penn State 49
    - (4) North Carolina 77, (21) Boston College 72
    - (5) UCLA 81, (19) Arizona 66
    - (6) Texas A&M 56, Oklahoma 49
    - (7) Pittsburgh 65, Washington 61
    - (8) Memphis 78, Gonzaga 77 (OT)
    - (9) Kansas 92, Nebraska 39
    - Louisville 61, (12) Marquette 59
    - (16) Southern Illinois 68, (13) Butler 64 (First meeting of two ranked teams in a "Bracket Busters" matchup.)
    - Missouri 75, (18) Oklahoma State 64
    - Michigan 58, (24) Indiana 55
    - (25) Alabama 72, (20) Kentucky 61
- Cricket:
  - Sri Lanka in India, 4th ODI in Visakhapatnam:
    - India 263/3 (41/47 ov) beat Sri Lanka 259/7 (47/47 ov) by 7 wickets (with 36 balls remaining). India win the series 2–1.

== 16 February 2007 (Friday) ==
- Cricket:
  - 2006–07 Chappell–Hadlee Trophy, 1st ODI in Wellington:
    - New Zealand 149/0 (27 ov) beat Australia 148 (49.3 ov) by 10 wickets (with 138 balls remaining).
- Basketball:
  - 2007 NBA Rookie Challenge: Sophomores 155, Rookies 114. David Lee (Sophomores/New York Knicks) win MVP honors.
  - 2006–07 Philippine Basketball Association Philippine Cup finals:
    For the second consecutive game, the Barangay Ginebra Kings blow out the San Miguel Beermen, 146–111 to tie the best of seven series 2–2 at the Araneta Coliseum.
- Football (soccer):
  - UNCAF Nations Cup 2007 in El Salvador, semifinals:
    - Panama 2 Guatemala 0.
    - Costa Rica 2 El Salvador 0.

== 15 February 2007 (Thursday) ==
- BALCO drugs scandal:
  - Colorado attorney Troy Ellerman pleads guilty in U.S. District Court in San Francisco to illegally leaking grand jury testimony relating to the BALCO investigation to San Francisco Chronicle reporters Mark Fainaru-Wada and Lance Williams. Federal prosecutors have dropped charges against the reporters, authors of the steroids exposé Game of Shadows. (AP via San Francisco Chronicle)
- Football (soccer):
  - 2006–07 UEFA Cup – Round of 32, first leg
    - Zulte Waregem 1 – 3 Newcastle United
    - Sporting Braga 1 – 0 Parma
    - Lens 3 – 1 Panathinaikos
    - Spartak Moscow 1 – 1 Celta Vigo
    - Steaua Bucharest 0 – 2 Sevilla
    - Tottenham Hotspur received a bye into the next round following Feyenoord's expulsion from the competition after crowd misbehaviour in their last group stage match. (UEFA.com)
  - UNCAF Nations Cup 2007 in El Salvador:
    - Fifth place: Honduras 9 Nicaragua 1. Honduras qualify to 2007 CONCACAF Gold Cup.
- Auto racing:
  - NASCAR NEXTEL Cup:
    - Gatorade Duel twin qualifying race winners: Tony Stewart and Jeff Gordon. Gordon however, will have to start from the rear of the field due to failure of the post-race inspection of a pair of bolts misaligning a shock absorber making the car one inch lower than NASCAR rules, but was allowed to keep the victory.
- US men's college basketball
  - (5) UCLA 67, Arizona State 61
  - California 63, (15) Oregon 61
  - (22) Southern California 80, (19) Arizona 75
  - Purdue 81, (24) Indiana 68

== 14 February 2007 (Wednesday) ==
- Football (soccer): 2006–07 UEFA Cup – Round of 32, first leg
  - Bayer Leverkusen 3 – 2 Blackburn Rovers
  - Hapoel Tel Aviv 2 – 1 Rangers
  - Livorno 1 – 2 Espanyol
  - Fenerbahçe 3 – 3 AZ Alkmaar
  - Werder Bremen 3 – 0 Ajax
  - CSKA Moscow 0 – 0 Maccabi Haifa
  - AEK Athens 0 – 2 Paris Saint-Germain
  - Benfica 1 – 0 Dinamo Bucharest
  - Shakhtar Donetsk 1 – 1 Nancy
  - Bordeaux 0 – 0 Osasuna (UEFA.com)
- Auto racing:
  - NASCAR punished Michael Waltrip Racing's No. 55 Toyota Camry driven by the owner with both their crew chief indefinitely suspended along with their vice president of competition, a fine of $100,000 (US$) and a loss of both 100 owner and driver points. Additionally, his time from Sunday's pole position qualifying was disqualified, and he will start in the back of Thursday's first Duel 150-mile races. (USA Today)
- Cricket
  - Sri Lanka in India, 3rd ODI in Margao:
    - India 233–5 (46.3 ov) beat Sri Lanka 230–8 (50 ov) by 5 wickets (21 balls remaining) to level the 4-match series 1–1.
  - Pakistan in South Africa, 5th ODI in Johannesburg:
    - South Africa 156–1 (28.2 ov) beat Pakistan 153 (40.5 ov) by 9 wickets (130 balls remaining) and win the series 3–1.
- Basketball:
  - NBA:
    - The Boston Celtics ended their club-record 18-game losing streak by defeating the Milwaukee Bucks, 117–97.
  - US men's college basketball
    - (1) Florida 76, (25) Alabama 67
    - (2) Ohio State 64, Penn State 62
    - (3) Wisconsin 75, Minnesota 62
    - (8) Memphis 69, Tulsa 52
    - (9) Kansas 75, Colorado 46
    - (10) Washington State 65, Washington 61
    - DePaul 72, (12) Marquette 67
    - Duke 78, (21) Boston College 70
    - Two Big Ten games – (24) Indiana at Purdue and Northwestern at Iowa – were postponed due to the midwestern blizzard.
  - 2006–07 Philippine Basketball Association Philippine Cup finals: Barangay Ginebra Kings 131, San Miguel Beermen 101; Beermen lead best-of-7 series 2–1.

== 13 February 2007 (Tuesday) ==
- US men's college basketball:
  - Virginia Tech 81, (4) North Carolina 80 (OT)
  - Texas Tech 77, (6) Texas A&M 75
  - Tennessee 89, (20) Kentucky 85
- Football (soccer):
  - UNCAF Nations Cup 2007 in El Salvador:
    - Panama 1 Costa Rica 0.

== 12 February 2007 (Monday) ==
- Ice hockey:
  - ESPN.com reports that the NHL will stage two regular season games in October of 2007 at The O_{2} arena in London, England. One of the participating teams will be the Los Angeles Kings, with the other to be announced later this year.
- Cricket:
  - Intercontinental Cup:
    - Ireland 531–5 Dec (111.2 ov.) beat United Arab Emirates 243 & 118. Ireland win by an innings and 170 runs, and advance to the final against Canada.
- American football:
  - Even after posting the best record in the NFL with a 14–2 record, the San Diego Chargers fire head coach Marty Schottenheimer as he was deemed by team management as being in a "dysfunctional situation". (Sports Illustrated)
- US men's college basketball:
  - Louisville 66, (7) Pittsburgh 53
  - Texas 83, (17) Oklahoma State 54
  - After four straight losses, Duke drops out of the AP poll for the first time since the end of the 1995–96 season. The Blue Devils' 200 consecutive weeks in the AP poll was the second-longest run in history, behind UCLA's 221 weeks from 1966 to 1980. (AP/Yahoo!)
  - Gonzaga lose at home for the first time in nearly four years. Their 84–73 loss to Santa Clara, in their second game without suspended star Josh Heytvelt, ends a 50-game streak, including the first 38 games they played in their current home, McCarthey Athletic Center.
- Football (soccer):
  - UNCAF Nations Cup 2007 in El Salvador:
    - Nicaragua 4 Belize 2.
    - El Salvador 0 Guatemala 0.

== 11 February 2007 (Sunday) ==
- Auto racing:
  - David Gilliland and Ricky Rudd are set for the front row of the 49th running of the Daytona 500 as the Robert Yates Racing teammates sweep the front row. However, two contenders for the title, Matt Kenseth (Roush Racing #17) and Kasey Kahne (Evernham Motorsports #9) had their times wiped out after failing post-qualifying inspection and two-time race winner Michael Waltrip's car was impounded due to an abnormal odor found in the carburetor. On Tuesday, the crew chiefs for Kenseth and Kahne were suspended for four races, fined $50,000 (US$) and both teams and their drivers will start the season fifty points in the red. Additionally, two other Evernham teams, those driven by Elliott Sadler (#19) and Scott Wimmer (#10) had their crew chiefs suspended for two races, were fined $25,000 and begin the year 25 points in the hole.
- Rugby union:
  - Six Nations:
    - Ireland 17 France 20
      - In a thrilling first-ever Rugby international played at Dublin's Croke Park, France secured victory with a very last minute converted try, a minute after Ireland took the lead for the first time. Ronan O'Gara scored all Ireland's points.
  - 2007 USA Sevens:
    - Fiji win their first Cup final of the 2006–07 season, avenging their defeat in the 2007 New Zealand Sevens final by Pacific rivals Samoa with a 38–24 win in San Diego. With the win, Fiji draw level with New Zealand atop the season table.
- Marcus Grönholm wins the 57th Uddeholm Swedish Rally, the second rally of the 2007 World Rally Championship season.
- Tennis:
  - 2007 Davis Cup World Group, first round, day 3:
    (home teams listed first)
    - Chile v Russia 2 – 3
    - France v Romania 4 – 1
    - Germany v Croatia 3 – 2
    - Belgium v Australia 3 – 2
    - Czech Republic v USA 1 – 4
    - Switzerland v Spain 2 – 3
    - Belarus v Sweden 2 – 3
    - Austria v Argentina 1 – 4
  - WTA Tour:
    - 2007 Open Gaz de France in Paris:
      Final: (4) (Russia) Nadia Petrova beat (Czech Republic) Lucie Šafářová 4–6 6–1 6–4.
    - 2007 Pattaya Women's Open:
      Final: (Austria) Sybille Bammer beat (6) (Argentina) Gisela Dulko 7–5 3–6 7–5.
- Cricket:
  - Pakistan in South Africa, 4th ODI in Cape Town:
    - South Africa 113/0 (14 ov) beat Pakistan 107 (45.4 ov) by 10 wickets (with 216 balls remaining). South Africa lead 2–1 in the 5-match series.
  - Sri Lanka in India, 2nd ODI in Rajkot:
    - Sri Lanka 257/8 (50 ov) beat India 252/9 (50 ov) by 5 runs. Sri Lanka lead 1–0 in the 4-match series.
  - 2006–07 Commonwealth Bank Series, second final in Sydney:
    - England 246/8 (50 ov) beat Australia 152/8 (27/27 ov) by 34 runs (D/L method) and won the final series 2–0.
- Basketball
  - US men's college basketball:
    - Maryland 72, (16) Duke 60. The Blue Devils slump to their first four-game losing streak since 1996.
    - Washington 64, (25) Stanford 52
  - 2006–07 Philippine Basketball Association Philippine Cup finals: The San Miguel Beermen take a 2–0 series lead after the Barangay Ginebra Kings failed to convert crucial freethrows at the endgame, winning 104–101 at the Araneta Coliseum. (Philippine Daily Inquirer)
- Football (soccer):
  - UNCAF Nations Cup 2007 in El Salvador:
    - Honduras 1 Panama 1.

== 10 February 2007 (Saturday) ==
- Auto racing:
  - The 2007 NASCAR season opens with the annual race for pole position winners, the Budweiser Shootout, won by Tony Stewart for the third time.
- Cricket:
  - Bangladesh in Zimbabwe, 4th ODI at Harare:
    - Bangladesh 246/9 (47.2 ov) beat Zimbabwe 244/8 (50 ov) by 1 wicket with 16 balls remaining. Bangladesh wins four-match series 3–1.
- Rugby union: Six Nations:
  - England 20 Italy 7 in London.
  - Scotland 21 Wales 9 in Edinburgh.
- Tennis:
  - 2007 Davis Cup World Group, first round, day 2:
    (home teams listed first)
    - Chile v Russia 1 – 2
    - France v Romania 2 – 1
    - Germany v Croatia 2 – 1
    - Belgium v Australia 2 – 1
    - Czech Republic v USA 1 – 2
    - Switzerland v Spain 1 – 2
    - Belarus v Sweden 1 – 2
    - Austria v Argentina 1 – 2
  - 2007 Open Gaz de France in Paris:
    - (Czech Republic) Lucie Šafářová upset top seed (Belgium) Justine Henin in the semifinal, following previous wins over No. 3 (Russia) Svetlana Kuznetsova and No. 5 (Czech Republic) Nicole Vaidišová. In the other semi, No. 4 (Russia) Nadia Petrova put out No. 2 (France) Amélie Mauresmo.
- American football: NFL 2007 Pro Bowl in Honolulu, Hawaiʻi:
  - AFC All-Stars 31, NFC All Stars 28. Cincinnati Bengals quarterback Carson Palmer is the game's MVP with two touchdown passes. A fourth quarter comeback by the NFC, with two touchdowns to tie the game 28–28, was for naught as the AFC got a pass interference call at the two-yard line to set up the game-winning last-second field goal by San Diego Chargers PK Nate Kaeding. The game was marred by an injury to New Orleans Saints QB Drew Brees, dislocating his non-throwing (left) elbow early in the exhibition contest that concluded the 2006 NFL season.
- Football (soccer):
  - UNCAF Nations Cup 2007 in El Salvador:
    - Guatemala 1 Belize 0.
    - El Salvador 2 Nicaragua 1.
      Both winners qualify to the semifinals and to 2007 CONCACAF Gold Cup.
- US men's college basketball:
  - (1) Florida 64, (20) Kentucky 61
  - West Virginia 70, (2) UCLA 65
  - (3) Ohio State 63, Purdue 56
  - (4) Wisconsin 74, Iowa 62
  - (5) North Carolina 104, Wake Forest 67
  - (6) Texas A&M 66, Nebraska 55
  - (7) Pittsburgh 74, Providence 68
  - (8) Memphis 95, Tulane 51
  - (9) Kansas 92, Missouri 74
  - Wright State 77, (10) Butler 65
  - (22) Georgetown 76, (11) Marquette 58
  - (24) Arizona 77, (13) Oregon 74
  - Ole Miss 75, (18) Alabama 69
  - Tennessee 84, (23) Vanderbilt 57
  - Two Gonzaga players, starter Josh Heytvelt and redshirt Theo Davis, are suspended from the team following their arrest on drug charges last night. Police in Cheney, Washington reported that they found psychedelic mushrooms and marijuana in the players' car during a routine traffic stop. (ESPN)

== 9 February 2007 (Friday) ==
- Cricket:
  - 2006–07 Commonwealth Bank Series, first final in Melbourne:
    - England 253/6 (49.3 ov) beat Australia 252 (48.3 ov) by 4 wickets with 3 balls remaining, and take 1–0 lead in the best-of-3 series.
  - Bangladesh in Zimbabwe, 3rd ODI in Harare:
    - Bangladesh 228/9 (50.0 ov) beat Zimbabwe 214 (49.4 ov) by 14 runs to lead four-match series 2–1.
  - Pakistan in South Africa, 3rd ODI in Port Elizabeth:
    - Pakistan 245/8 (49.5 ov). South Africa did not bat. Rain forces abandonment of match.
- Football (soccer):
  - UNCAF Nations Cup 2007 in El Salvador:
    - Costa Rica 3 Honduras 1.
- Tennis – 2007 Davis Cup:
  - 2007 Davis Cup World Group, first round, day 1:
    (home teams listed first)
    - Chile v Russia 0 – 2
    - France v Romania 2 – 0
    - Germany v Croatia 1 – 1
    - Belgium v Australia 2 – 0
    - Czech Republic v USA 1 – 1
    - Switzerland v Spain 1 – 1
    - Belarus v Sweden 0 – 2
    - Austria v Argentina 0 – 2
- Basketball: 2006–07 Philippine Basketball Association Philippine Cup Championship Round: (Philippine Daily Inquirer)
  - Finals: The San Miguel Beermen built had huge lead at the first half to prevent a Barangay Ginebra Kings comeback to win Game 1 of their best of seven series, 118–94.
  - Third-place playoff: The Talk 'N Text Phone Pals built their own huge lead in which Red Bull Barako was not able to catch up with to clinch the third-place trophy.

== 8 February 2007 (Thursday) ==
- Basketball:
  - US men's college basketball:
    - (8) Memphis 70, UAB 56
    - (10) Butler 92, Cleveland State 50
    - (14) Washington State 58, (25) Stanford 45
  - US women's college basketball:
    - (1) Duke 64, (2) North Carolina 53. The Blue Devils remain the only unbeaten team in NCAA Division I, taking down the previously unbeaten Tar Heels in Chapel Hill.
  - Israel state cup final:
    - Hapoel Jerusalem 103, Bney Hasharon 85.
- Football (soccer):
  - UNCAF Nations Cup 2007 in El Salvador:
    - Guatemala 1 Nicaragua 0.
    - El Salvador 2 Belize 1.
- Cricket:
  - Sri Lanka in India, 1st ODI in Kolkata:
    - Sri Lanka 102 for 3 (18.2 overs) v India – Match abandoned due to rain.

== 7 February 2007 (Wednesday) ==
- Football (soccer):
  - In the aftermath of the Catania riots that postponed or canceled all football matches in Italy since 2 February, the Italian government approved recommendations of a fact-finding panel. The panel found that only four of the thirty-one Italian football stadiums in Serie A and Serie B are capable to host soccer matches. San Siro in Milan is among those ruled out, which means that A.C. Milan and Inter Milan's upcoming Champions League fixtures would probably be moved to neutral sites, as would Parma and Livorno's UEFA Cup fixtures, as their stadia were also declared unsafe by the government. Additionally, no nighttime matches will be held for the rest of February and many matches will be held "behind closed doors" in empty stadiums. In response, several clubs along with the Italian soccer players' union said they would go on strike against these draconian motions.
  - Euro 2008 Qualifying:
    - San Marino 1 – 2 Republic of Ireland
  - Friendly international matches:
    - China 2 – 1 Kazakhstan
    - Iran 2 – 2 Belarus
    - Uzbekistan 0 – 0 Azerbaijan
    - Albania 0 – 1 North Macedonia
    - Hungary 2 – 0 Latvia
    - Romania 2 – 0 Moldova
    - Israel 1 – 1 Ukraine. Seventeen-year-old Ben Sahar of Chelsea makes his debut and becomes the youngest-ever player in Israel national football team history.
    - Botswana 1 – 0 Namibia
    - Cyprus 0 – 3 Bulgaria
    - Georgia 1 – 0 Turkey
    - Malta 1 – 1 Austria
    - Algeria 2 – 1 Libya
    - Egypt 2 – 0 Sweden
    - Luxembourg 2 – 1 Gambia
    - Togo 2 – 2 Cameroon
    - Germany 3 – 1 Switzerland
    - Croatia 2 – 1 Norway
    - Slovenia 1 – 0 Estonia
    - Andorra 0 – 0 Armenia
    - Netherlands 4 – 1 Russia
    - Poland 2 – 2 Slovakia
    - Morocco 1 – 1 Tunisia
    - Belgium 0 – 2 Czech Republic
    - England 0 – 1 Spain
    - France 0 – 1 Argentina
    - United States 2 – 0 Mexico
    - Venezuela 0 – 1 Chile
    - Colombia 1 – 3 Uruguay
- Cricket:
  - ICC World Cricket League Division One in Nairobi:
    - Final: Kenya 158/2 (37.5 ov) beat Scotland 155 (47 ov) by 8 wickets (with 73 balls remaining).
  - Pakistan in South Africa, 2nd ODI in Durban:
    - Pakistan 351/4 (50 ov) beat South Africa 210 (40 ov) by 141 runs, and levels the 5-match series 1–1.
- Basketball:
  - Former NBA player John Amaechi becomes the first NBA player, active or retired, to come out as gay. He will reveal this in his autobiography to be released later this month, and will also appear on ESPN's Outside the Lines on 11 February. (ESPN)
  - US men's college basketball:
    - (1) Florida 71, Georgia 61
    - (2) UCLA 70, (19) Southern California 65
    - (4) Wisconsin 71, Penn State 58
    - (5) North Carolina 79, (16) Duke 73
    - (7) Pittsburgh 60, West Virginia 47
    - (9) Kansas 97, Kansas State 70
    - Oklahoma 67, (17) Oklahoma State 60
  - 2006–07 PBA Philippine Cup semifinals: The San Miguel Beermen book the last finals berth against sister team Barangay Ginebra Kings after a Game 7 119–115 victory against Red Bull Barako at the Araneta Coliseum. (Philippine Daily Inquirer)

== 6 February 2007 (Tuesday) ==
- Football (soccer) Friendly games:
  - In London, England:
    - Ghana 4–1 Niger
    - Portugal 2–0 Brazil
    - South Korea 1–0 Greece
    - Denmark 3–1 Australia
  - In Belfast, Northern Ireland:
    - Northern Ireland 0–0 Wales
  - In La Courneuve, France:
    - Mali 3–1 Lithuania
  - In Rouen, France:
    - Ivory Coast 1–0 Guinea
  - Cyprus International Tournament 2007:
    - In Limassol, Cyprus:
      - Cyprus 2–1 Hungary
    - In Larnaca, Cyprus:
      - Bulgaria 2–0 Latvia
- Cricket:
  - 2006–07 Commonwealth Bank Series in Brisbane:
    - England 270/7 (50 ov) beat New Zealand 256/8 (50 ov) by 14 runs. England qualify to the final vs Australia.
  - Bangladesh in Zimbabwe, 2nd ODI in Harare:
    - Zimbabwe 156/2 (35.2 ov) beat Bangladesh 153 (46 ov) by 8 wickets (with 88 balls remaining), and levels the 4-match series 1:1.
- US men's college basketball:
  - (3) Ohio State 76, Michigan 63
  - San Diego State 62, (15) Air Force 41

== 5 February 2007 (Monday) ==
- Tennis:
  - 2007 ATP Tour – International Tennis Championships in Delray Beach, Florida, USA:
    - Final: Xavier Malisse (Belgium) beat James Blake (United States) 5–7 6–4 6–4. The match was postponed due to rain on Sunday. Malisse becomes the first player to win two titles this year.
- Cricket:
  - 2007 ICC World Cricket League Division One in Nairobi:
    - Bermuda 269/5 (49 ov) beat Scotland 268/9 (50 ov) by 5 wickets (with 6 balls remaining).
    - Kenya 250/9 (50 ov) beat Canada 92 (14.5 ov) by 158 runs.
    - Netherlands 260/7 (46/46 ov) beat Ireland 254/8 (46/46 ov) by 6 runs.
      Kenya and Scotland qualify to the final and to 2007 Twenty20 World Championship.
- US men's college basketball:
  - (6) Texas A&M 100, Texas 82

== 4 February 2007 (Sunday) ==
- American football:
  - NFL Super Bowl XLI at Dolphin Stadium, Miami Gardens, Florida:
    - Indianapolis Colts 29, Chicago Bears 17. The Colts win their first Super Bowl since moving to Indianapolis from Baltimore, namely Super Bowl V, also held in Miami. The Bears' Devin Hester returns the opening kickoff 92 yards for a touchdown, a first for the championship game. After a 53-yard touchdown pass from Peyton Manning to Reggie Wayne closes the gap to one point, Thomas Jones sets up another Bears TD with a 52-yard run. But Indy's defense largely shuts down Chicago after that. Dominic Rhodes' 1-yard touchdown run puts the Colts ahead 16–14 at halftime. The Bears hang in until early in the fourth quarter, when Kelvin Hayden returns a Rex Grossman interception 56 yards for a touchdown. Manning, who goes 25 of 38 for 247 yards with one touchdown and one interception, is named MVP.
- Bandy: World Championship:
  - Final: Russia defeat Sweden, 3–1, to win the world championship.
- Team handball – Men's World Championship in Germany:
  - Final: Germany 29 Poland 24.
  - 3rd/fourth place: Denmark 34 France 27.
- Football (soccer):
  - 2007 ASEAN Football Championship, Final second Leg:
    Thailand 1 Singapore 1 (Singapore win 3–2 on aggregate).
- Rugby union: Six Nations:
  - Wales 9 Ireland 19
- Cricket:
  - Pakistan in South Africa, 1st ODI in Centurion:
    - South Africa 392/6 (50 ov) beat Pakistan 228 (46.4 ov) by 164 runs.
  - Bangladesh in Zimbabwe, 1st ODI in Harare:
    - Bangladesh 260/9 (50 ov) beat Zimbabwe 215 (48 ov) by 45 runs.
  - 2006–07 Commonwealth Bank Series in Melbourne:
    - Australia 291/5 (48.2 ov) beat New Zealand 290/7 (50 ov) by 5 wickets (with 10 balls remaining).
  - 2007 ICC World Cricket League Division One in Nairobi, Kenya:
    - Netherlands 198/2 (43.1 ov) beat Bermuda 194 (46.3 ov) by 8 wickets (with 41 balls remaining).
    - Canada 312/4 (49.4 ov) beat Ireland 308/7 (50 ov) by 6 wickets (with 2 balls remaining).
    - Scotland 254/8 (50 ov) beat Kenya 177 (46 ov) by 77 runs.
      Scotland qualify to the final. Their opponent will be decided on Monday from Kenya, Canada or Netherlands.
- Tennis:
  - 2007 WTA Tour – Toray Pan Pacific Open in Tokyo, Japan:
    - Final: (2) Martina Hingis (Switzerland) def. (5) Ana Ivanovic (Serbia) 6–4 6–2
  - 2007 ATP Tour – Movistar Open in Viña del Mar, Chile:
    - Final: (5) Luis Horna (Peru) def. (3) Nicolás Massú (Chile) 7–5 6–3
  - 2007 ATP Tour – International Tennis Championships in Delray Beach, Florida, USA:
    - Final: (1) James Blake (United States) vs (3) Xavier Malisse (Belgium) 7–5 3–3 (postponed)
  - 2007 ATP Tour – PBZ Zagreb Indoors in Zagreb, Croatia:
    - Final: (2) Marcos Baghdatis (Cyprus) def. (1) Ivan Ljubičić (Croatia) 7–6(4) 4–6 6–4
- Basketball:
  - US men's college basketball:
    - Florida State 68, (8) Duke 67
  - 2006–07 Philippine Basketball Association Philippine Cup semifinals: (Philippine Daily Inquirer)
    - The Barangay Ginebra Kings defeated the Talk 'N Text Phone Pals, 98–89 to win their best of seven series 4–2, to advance to the finals. The game saw one ejection and three flagrant fouls.
    - On the other semifinal series, Red Bull Barako forced a deciding Game 7 with a 104–100 win against the San Miguel Beermen. The game saw four technical fouls and an ejection.

== 3 February 2007 (Saturday) ==
- American football: The Pro Football Hall of Fame formally announces that Gene Hickerson, Michael Irvin, Bruce Matthews, Charlie Sanders, Thurman Thomas and Roger Wehrli are selected for induction as the Class of 2007. (ESPN)
- Rugby union:
  - Six Nations:
    - Italy 3 France 39
    - England 42 Scotland 20
  - Super 14 – Round 1:
    - Brumbies 21 Chiefs 15.
    - Reds 25 Hurricanes 16.
    - Sharks 17 Bulls 3.
    - Cheetahs 27 Stormers 9.
- US men's college basketball:
  - (1) Florida 94, Tennessee 78
  - (2) Wisconsin 69, Northwestern 52
  - NC State 83, (3) North Carolina 79
  - (4) Ohio State 63, Michigan State 54
  - (5) UCLA 82, Oregon State 35
  - (10) Texas A&M 69, (6) Kansas 66
  - USC 71, (9) Oregon 68
  - Colorado 89, (12) Oklahoma State 77
  - Boston College 80, (16) Virginia Tech 59
  - South Florida 69, (21) Notre Dame 63
  - Kansas State 73, (22) Texas 72
  - Georgia Tech 80, (25) Clemson 62

== 2 February 2007 (Friday) ==
- American college football: The 2006–07 college football post-season concluded with the inaugural Texas vs. The Nation Game in which The Nation team won 24–20.
- Cricket:
  - 2006–07 Commonwealth Bank Series in Sydney:
    - England 292/7 (50 overs) beat Australia 200 (38.5 overs) by 92 runs.
  - 2007 ICC World Cricket League Division One in Nairobi:
    - Canada 162/8 (21/21 overs) beat Bermuda 106 (15.5/21 overs) by 56 runs.
    - Kenya 286/9 (49 overs) beat Ireland 284/4 (50 overs) by 1 wicket (with 6 balls remaining).
    - Scotland 207/8 (37/37 overs) beat Netherlands 205 (36.5/37 overs) by 2 runs.
  - Pakistan in South Africa:
    - Twenty20 International in Johannesburg:
      South Africa 132/0 (11.3/20 overs) beat Pakistan 129/8 (20/20 overs) by 10 wickets (with 51 balls remaining).
- Cycling – 2007 Tour of Qatar:
  - After winning stages 2, 3 and 4 already, Tom Boonen also wins the final stage. His teammate Wilfried Cretskens ends first in the General classification to complete a successful week for Quick-Step–Innergetic as they had also won the opening team time trial.
- Football (soccer): All football matches in Italy, including next Wednesday's friendly international between Italy and Romania, are indefinitely cancelled following the death of a policeman during rioting at the Catania vs Palermo local derby in Sicily. (Reuters)
- Rugby union:
  - Super 14 – Round 1:
    - Blues 34 Crusaders 25.
    - Highlanders 8 Force 7.
    - Waratahs 25 Lions 16.

== 1 February 2007 (Thursday) ==
- Team handball – Men's World Championship in Germany:
  - Semifinals:
    - Germany 32 France 31 (2OT).
    - Poland 36 Denmark 33 (2OT).
  - Placement matches 5th–8th:
    - Croatia 35 Spain 27.
    - Russia 28 Iceland 25.
- Basketball:
  - Euroleague, last round of regular season
    (Bold teams advance to Top 16)
    - Group A:
      - (Turkey) Efes Pilsen 72 (Russia) Dynamo Moscow 76.
      - (Greece) Olympiacos 77 (Germany) RheinEnergie Köln 73.
      - (Spain) TAU Cerámica 86 (France) Le Mans 54.
      - (Poland) Prokom Trefl Sopot 78 (Italy) Climamio Bologna 84.
    - Group B:
      - (Italy) Lottomatica Roma 81 (Croatia) Cibona 58.
      - (Spain) DKV Joventut 82 (Slovenia) Union Olimpija 86.
      - (Israel) Maccabi Tel Aviv 76 (Greece) Panathinaikos 73.
      - (Serbia) Partizan 90 (Spain) Unicaja Málaga 94 (OT).
  - US men's college basketball:
    - (5) UCLA 69, (9) Oregon 57
    - Virginia 68, (8) Duke 66 (OT)
    - (18) Washington State 72, (20) Arizona 66
