= MS Dhoni =

Indian cricketer (born 1981)

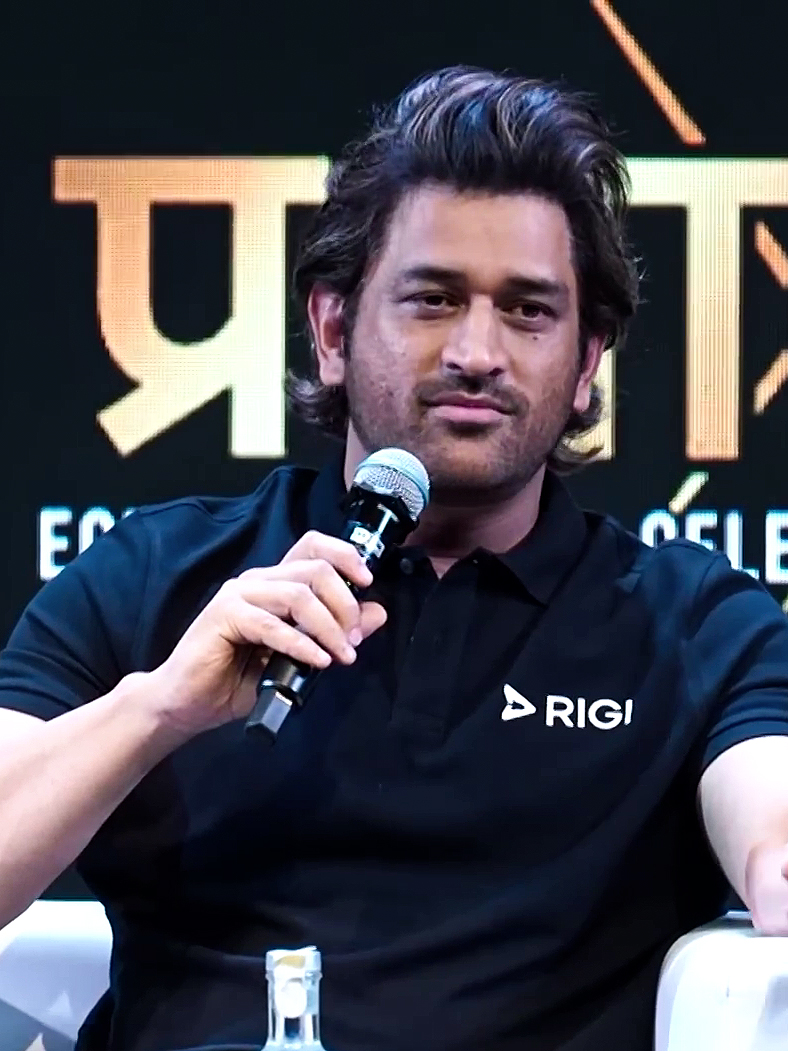
- Dhoni in 2023

Personal details
- Born: Mahendra Singh Dhauni; 7 July 1981 (age 45) Ranchi, Bihar (present-day Jharkhand), India
- Height: 5 ft 9 in (175 cm)
- Spouse: Sakshi Rawat (m. 2010)
- Awards: Padma Bhushan (2018); Padma Shri (2009); Major Dhyan Chand Khel Ratna Award (2008)
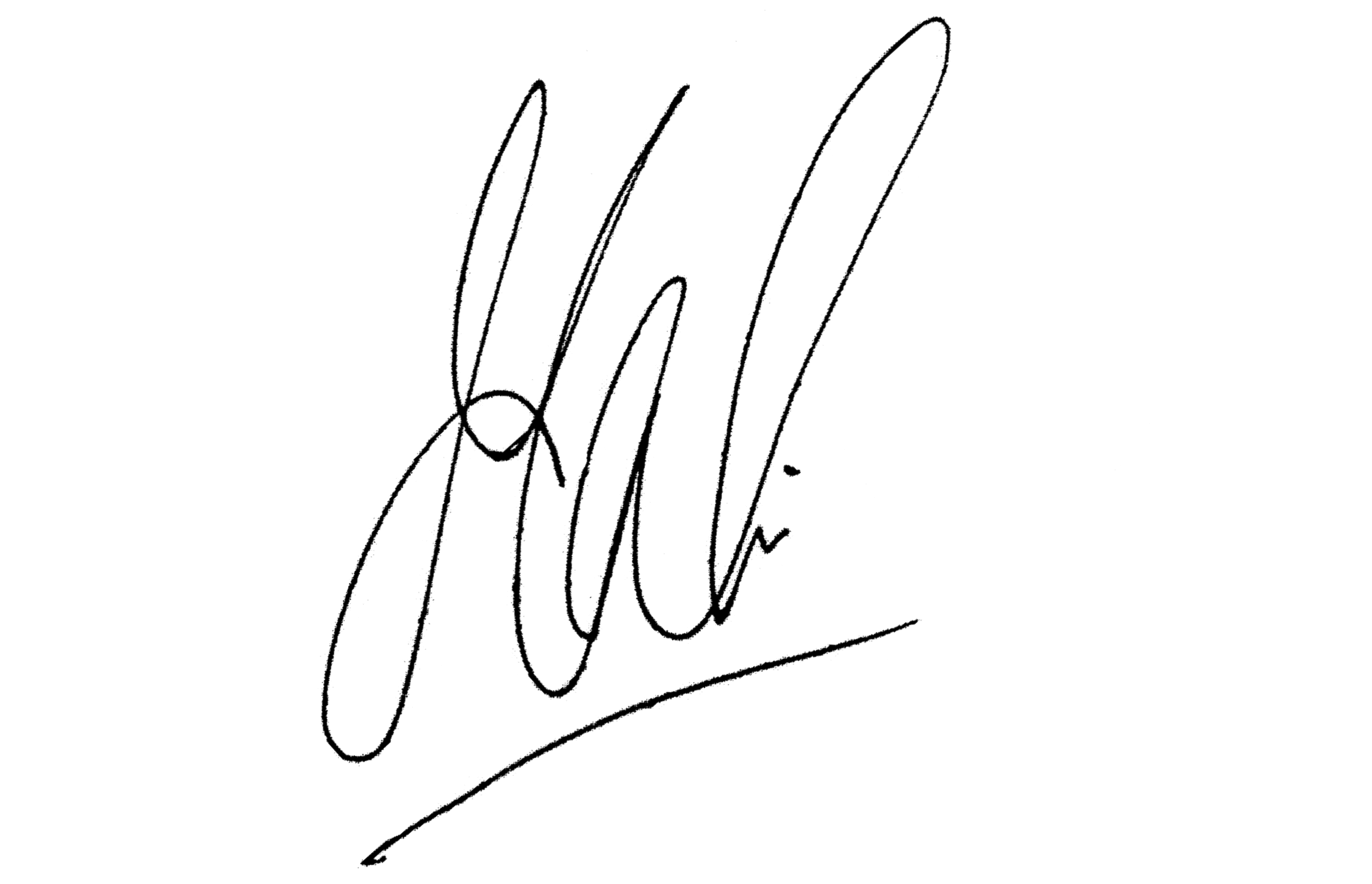
- Signature
- Nickname(s): Mahi, Thala, Captain Cool

Military service
- Allegiance: India
- Branch/service: Indian Army
- Years of service: 2011–present
- Rank: Lieutenant colonel (Hon.)
- Unit: Territorial Army; Parachute Regiment
- Cricket career

Personal information
- Full name: Mahendra Singh Dhoni
- Batting: Right-handed
- Bowling: Right-arm medium
- Role: Wicket-keeper-batter

International information
- National side: India (2004–2019)
- Test debut (cap 251): 2 December 2005 v Sri Lanka
- Last Test: 26 December 2014 v Australia
- ODI debut (cap 158): 23 December 2004 v Bangladesh
- Last ODI: 9 July 2019 v New Zealand
- ODI shirt no.: 7
- T20I debut (cap 2): 1 December 2006 v South Africa
- Last T20I: 27 February 2019 v Australia
- T20I shirt no.: 7

Domestic team information
- Years: Team
- 1999–2004: Bihar
- 2004–2017: Jharkhand
- 2008–2015, 2018–2026: Chennai Super Kings (squad no. 7)
- 2016–2017: Rising Pune Supergiant (squad no. 7)

Career statistics
| Competition | Test | ODI | T20I | FC |
|---|---|---|---|---|
| Matches | 90 | 350 | 98 | 131 |
| Runs scored | 4,876 | 10,773 | 1,617 | 7,038 |
| Batting average | 38.09 | 50.57 | 37.60 | 36.84 |
| 100s/50s | 6/33 | 10/73 | 0/2 | 9/47 |
| Top score | 224 | 183* | 56 | 224* |
| Balls bowled | 96 | 36 | – | 126 |
| Wickets | 0 | 1 | – | 0 |
| Bowling average | – | 31.00 | – | – |
| 5 wickets in innings | – | 0 | – | – |
| 10 wickets in match | – | 0 | – | – |
| Best bowling | – | 1/14 | – | – |
| Catches/stumpings | 256/38 | 321/123 | 57/34 | 364/57 |
Medal record
Men's cricket
Representing India
ICC Cricket World Cup
| Winner | 2011 India-Sri Lanka-Bangladesh |
ICC T20 World Cup
| Winner | 2007 South Africa |
| Runner-up | 2014 Bangladesh |
ICC Champions Trophy
| Winner | 2013 England and Wales |
| Runner-up | 2017 England and Wales |
ACC Asia Cup
| Winner | 2010 Sri Lanka |
| Winner | 2016 Bangladesh |
| Winner | 2018 United Arab Emirates |
| Runner-up | 2008 Pakistan |
- Source: ESPNcricinfo, 30 March 2025

Mahendra Singh Dhoni ([məˈɦeːnd̪ɾə ˈsɪŋɡʱ ˈd̪ʱoːniː]; born 7 July 1981) is an Indian former cricketer who played as a right-handed batter and a wicket-keeper. Widely regarded as one of the most prolific wicket-keeper batsmen and captains, he represented the Indian cricket team and was the captain of the team in limited overs formats from 2007 to 2017 and in Test cricket from 2008 to 2014. Dhoni has captained the most number of international matches and is the most successful Indian captain. He has led India to victory in the 2007 ICC World Twenty20, the 2011 Cricket World Cup, and the 2013 ICC Champions Trophy, being the only captain to win three different limited overs ICC tournaments. He also led the teams that won the Asia Cup in 2010 and 2016, and was a member of the title-winning squad in 2018.

Born in Ranchi, Dhoni made his first-class debut for Bihar in 1999. He made his debut for the Indian cricket team on 23 December 2004 in an ODI against Bangladesh and played his first Test a year later against Sri Lanka. In 2007, he became the captain of the ODI team before taking over as captain in all formats by 2008. Dhoni retired from Test cricket in 2014 but continued playing in limited overs cricket until 2019. He has scored 17,266 runs in international cricket, including 10,773 runs at an average of more than 50 in ODIs.

In the Indian Premier League (IPL), Dhoni primarily played for the Chennai Super Kings (CSK), leading them to the finals on ten occasions and winning the title five times (2010, 2011, 2018, 2021, and 2023)– a record he jointly shares with Rohit Sharma. He has also led CSK to two Champions League T20 titles in 2010 and 2014. Dhoni is among the few batsmen to have scored more than five thousand runs in the IPL, as well as being the first wicket-keeper to do so. He retired from the IPL in 2026.

In 2008, Dhoni was awarded India's highest sporting honour, the Khel Ratna Award, by the Government of India. He received the fourth highest civilian award, the Padma Shri, in 2009 and third highest civilian award, the Padma Bhushan, in 2018. Dhoni holds an honorary rank of Lieutenant Colonel in the Parachute Regiment of the Indian Territorial Army which was presented to him by the Indian Army in 2011. In June 2025, he was inducted into the ICC Cricket Hall of Fame.

== Early life ==
Dhoni was born on 7 July 1981 in Ranchi, Bihar (now in Jharkhand) in a Hindu Rajput family to Pan Singh and Devaki Devi. His parents hailed from Lwali village in the Almora district of Uttar Pradesh (now Uttarakhand). He was the youngest of three children. His family spells the surname as "Dhauni". The spelling "Dhoni" emerged due to a spelling mistake in his school certificates and, despite repeated attempts by his family, has never been rectified.

Dhoni did his schooling from DAV Jawahar Vidya Mandir, where he started playing football as a goalkeeper, but later moved to play cricket on the suggestion of his coach Keshav Banerjee. From 2001 to 2003, Dhoni worked as a Travelling Ticket Examiner (TTE) at Kharagpur under South Eastern Railway zone of Indian Railways.

== Youth career ==
He played as a wicket-keeper for Commando cricket club from 1995 to 1998 and Central Coal Fields Limited (CCL) team in 1998. At CCL, he batted higher up the order and helped the team qualify to the higher division. Based on his performance at club cricket, he was picked for the 1997/98 season of Vinoo Mankad Trophy under-16 championship. In the 1998–99, Dhoni played for Bihar U-19 team in the Cooch Behar Trophy and scored 176 runs in 5 matches. In the 1999–2000 Cooch Behar Trophy, the Bihar U-19 cricket team made it to the finals, where Dhoni made 84 in a losing cause. Dhoni's contribution in the tournament included 488 runs in nine matches with five fifties, 17 catches and seven stumpings. Dhoni made it to the East Zone U-19 squad for the C. K. Nayudu Trophy in the 1999–2000 season and scored only 97 runs in four matches, as East Zone lost all the matches and finished last in the tournament.

Dhoni made his Ranji Trophy debut for Bihar against Assam in the 1999–2000 season, as an eighteen-year-old scoring 68 runs in the second innings. Dhoni finished the season with 283 runs in 5 matches. Dhoni scored his maiden first-class century while playing for Bihar against Bengal in the 2000–01 Ranji Trophy season. Apart from this century, his performance in the 2000/01 season did not include another score over fifty and in the 2001–02 Ranji Trophy season, he scored just five fifties in four Ranji matches. Dhoni played for Jharkhand in the 2002–03 Ranji Trophy and represented East Zone in the Deodhar Trophy where he started gaining recognition for his lower-order contribution as well as hard-hitting batting style. In the 2003/04 season, Dhoni scored a century (128*) against Assam in the first match of the Ranji ODI tournament and was part of the East Zone squad that won the Deodhar Trophy, scoring 244 runs in four matches.

In the Duleep Trophy finals, Dhoni represented East Zone and scored a fighting half-century in the second innings in a losing cause. Dhoni was identified as one of the emerging talents via the BCCI's small-town talent-spotting initiative TRDW. In 2004, Dhoni was picked for the India A squad for a tour of Zimbabwe and Kenya. Against the Zimbabwe XI in Harare Sports Club, Dhoni contributed seven catches and four stumpings. In the tri-nation tournament involving Kenya, India A and Pakistan A, Dhoni helped India A chase down their target of 223 against Pakistan A with a half-century and scored 362 runs in six innings at an average of 72.40 with back to back centuries.

== International career ==
=== Debut and early years ===
The Indian ODI team in the early 2000s saw Rahul Dravid as the wicket-keeper to ensure that the wicket-keeper spot didn't lack in batting talent and also tried other wicket-keeper/batsmen like Parthiv Patel and Dinesh Karthik. With Dhoni performing well for the India A squad, he was picked in the ODI squad for the Bangladesh tour in December 2004. Dhoni made his debut in the first match of the series and was run out for a duck. Dhoni was picked for the subsequent ODI series against Pakistan. In the second match of the series in Visakhapatnam, Dhoni playing in his fifth one-day international, scored 148 runs off 123 deliveries which surpassed the earlier record for the highest score by an Indian wicket-keeper. Dhoni played in the Sri Lankan bilateral ODI series in October–November 2005 and was promoted to No. 3 in the batting order in the third ODI at Jaipur where he scored an unbeaten 183 runs off 145 balls, winning the game for India. The innings would surpass his earlier record for the highest score by an Indian wicket-keeper and was described in Wisden Almanack as 'Uninhibited, yet anything but crude'. It was also the highest individual score in ODI cricket in a run chase, a record which was broken seven years later by Shane Watson. Dhoni ended the series with the highest aggregate of 346 runs and was awarded the Man of the series.

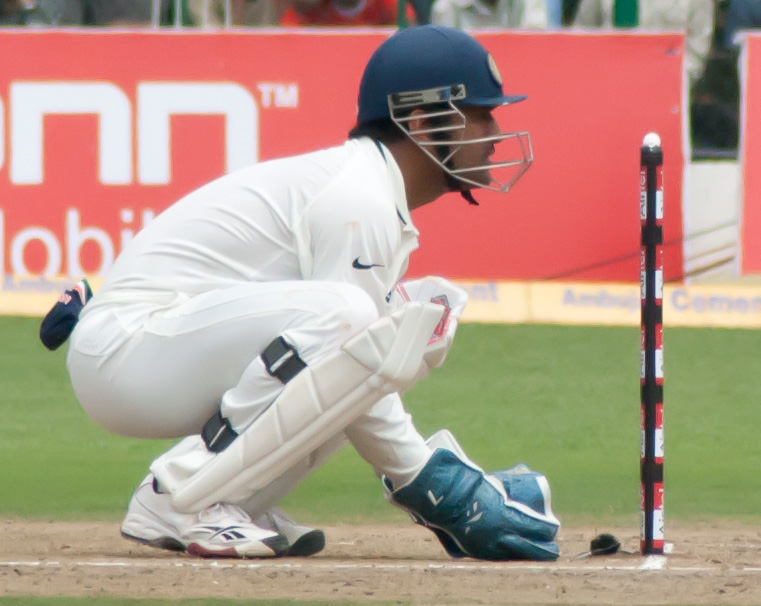
Dhoni keeping wickets in a test match

Dhoni became a regular in the Indian team after the home series against South Africa in November 2005. In December 2005, Dhoni was awarded a "B" grade contract by the BCCI. Dhoni made his test debut in the same month against Sri Lanka during their tour of India at Chennai. Dhoni scored 30 runs in his debut match, that was marred by rain and ended in a draw. Dhoni made his maiden half-century in the second test leading to an Indian win. Dhoni played all the matches in the subsequent tour of Pakistan scoring 219 runs in five ODI matches and 179 runs in five tests including his maiden test century in the second test in Faisalabad. He scored 106 runs across three tests in the home series against England in March 2006 and 177 runs in five ODI series that followed. Dhoni dropped multiple catches and missed dismissal chances including a key stumping opportunity of Andrew Flintoff which led to criticism of his wicket-keeping.

In the DLF Cup 2006-07, Dhoni scored 43 runs as the team lost twice in three games and did not qualify for the finals. In the 2006 ICC Champions Trophy, India lost to West Indies and Australia, though Dhoni scored a half-century against West Indies and failed to make it to the knock out stage. In the ODI series in South Africa in November 2006, Dhoni scored 139 runs in four matches in the series loss. In the test series that followed, Dhoni scored 114 runs in two tests including a first test victory in South Africa in the first test, but was ruled out of the third test with injury. Dhoni made his T20 international debut in December 2006 against South Africa at Johannesburg. Dhoni was subsequently named in the ODI team of the year by the ICC for 2006.

=== 2007 World T20 and captaincy ===
India recorded identical 3–1 victory over West Indies and Sri Lanka in early 2007 with Dhoni averaging more than 100 in both the series. Subsequently, Dhoni was part of the India squad for the 2007 Cricket World Cup in which India unexpectedly exited the tournament at the group stage after suffering losses to Bangladesh and Sri Lanka. In the tournament, Dhoni scored 29 runs across three innings, which included two ducks. After India's exit from the tournament, Dhoni's house in Ranchi was vandalised and damaged by members of Jharkhand Mukti Morcha and security was tightened for his family. Dhoni scored 91* against Bangladesh in the first match of the ODI series in May 2007 which got him the Man of the Match award while also later winning the Man of the Series award after the third game of the series was washed away. Dhoni played for ACC Asia XI cricket team in the Afro-Asia Cup, scoring 174 runs in three matches at an average of 87 including 139 off 97 balls in the third ODI.

Dhoni was named vice-captain of the ODI team for the 2007 Future Cup against South Africa in Ireland and the subsequent seven-match series against England. Dhoni was awarded an 'A' grade contract by BCCI in June 2007. Dhoni was appointed as the captain of the Indian squad for the inaugural World Twenty20 in September 2007. Dhoni led India to victory in the tournament after defeating Pakistan in the final. Dhoni was later appointed as the captain of the Indian cricket team in all formats.

On 2 September 2007, Dhoni equalled Adam Gilchrist's international record for the most dismissals in an innings in ODI by effecting six dismissals against England. Dhoni took his first and only wicket in international cricket on 30 September 2009 when he bowled Travis Dowlin of West Indies in the 2009 ICC Champions Trophy. However, he scored just three runs in the only match he batted with India crashing out of the series in the group stage after the match against Australia was washed out. Dhoni averaged more than 60 in the 2008-09 season. Dhoni scored two centuries during Sri Lanka's tour of India in November 2009 which India won to achieve the top ranking in ICC test ranking for the first time in its history. Dhoni had an excellent year in ODIs in 2009, scoring 1198 runs in just 24 innings, at an average of 70.43 and topped the ICC ODI batsman rankings for several months. He was named as the captain and wicket-keeper of the ICC ODI Team of the year.

=== 2011 World Cup win and later ===
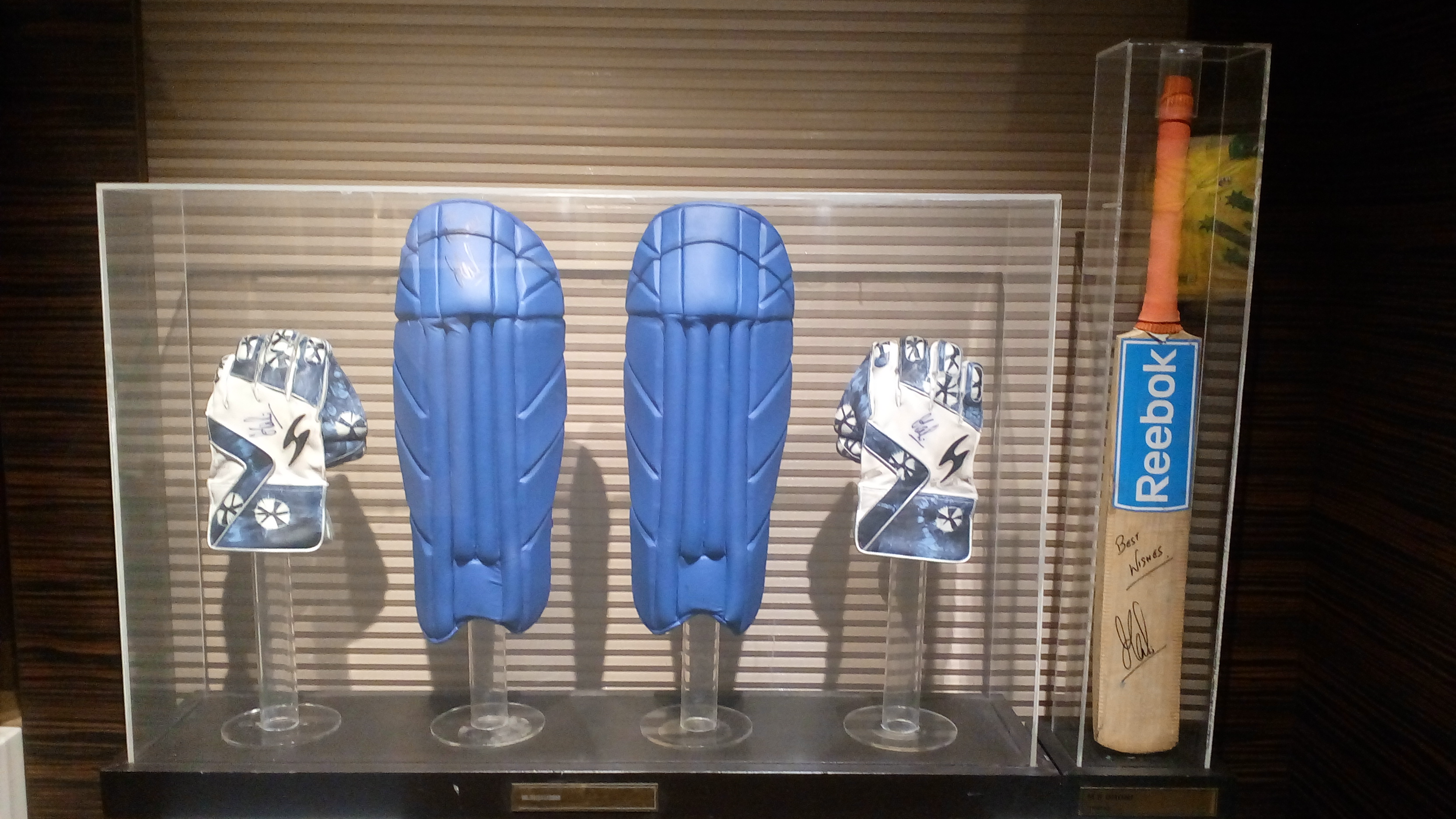
Wicket-keeping kit and bat used by Dhoni during the 2011 Cricket World Cup on display at the Blades of Glory Cricket Museum

Dhoni led the Indian squad for the 2011 Cricket World Cup co-hosted by India. India won its second ever ODI world cup after defeating Sri Lanka in the final with Dhoni being named man of the match for scoring an unbeaten 91. In December 2012, Pakistan toured India for a bilateral series for the first time in five years and Dhoni top-scored in all the three matches of the series with a century in the first ODI at Chennai. Dhoni led India to victory in the 2013 ICC Champions Trophy and became the first and the only captain in international cricket to claim all ICC limited overs trophies. In the rain-shortened final against England, India won by five runs on DLS method though Dhoni himself was out for a duck. He was also named as captain and wicketkeeper of the 'Team of the Tournament' by the ICC.

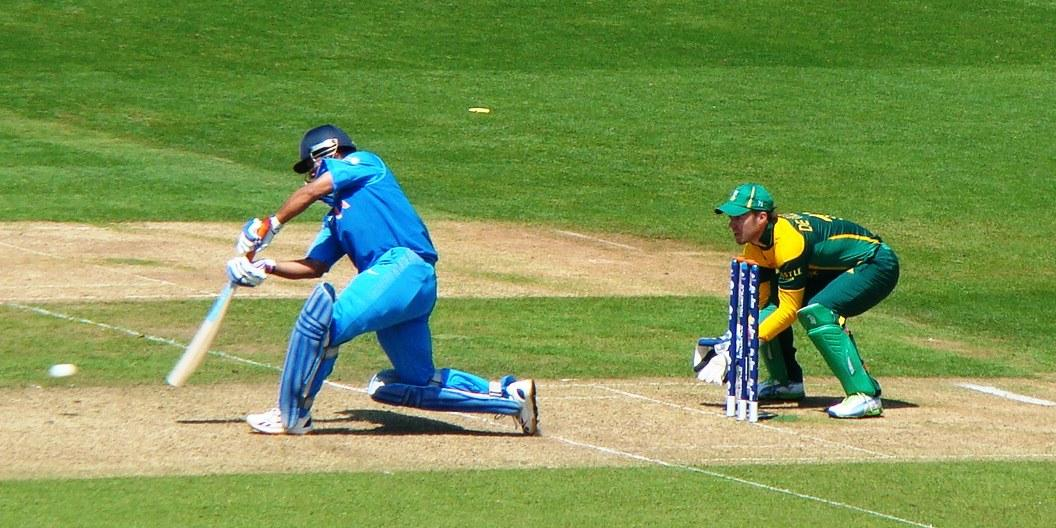
Dhoni batting against South Africa during a group stage match of 2013 ICC Champions Trophy

After the Champions Trophy, India toured West Indies for a tri-nation tournament against the hosts and Sri Lanka. Dhoni got injured at the start of the tournament thus ruling him out for most of the tournament. He returned to play the final where he was adjudged Man of the match for scoring 45 runs off 52 balls including 16 runs in the final over to take India to victory by one wicket. In November 2013, Dhoni became the second India batsman after Sachin Tendulkar to aggregate more than thousand runs in ODIs against Australia. India toured South Africa and New Zealand in the 2013–14 season. Though Dhoni scored 84 runs at an average of 48 including one half-century against South Africa and 272 runs with three consecutive 50-plus scores against New Zealand, India lost both the series. Dhoni himself reached 8000 runs in ODI in the series against New Zealand. Dhoni led India in the 2014 ICC World Twenty20 where India finished as runners-up after losing to Sri Lanka in the final. He was named as captain and wicket-keeper of the 'Team of the Tournament' by the ICC.

India won the away ODI series in England in 2014 and series against West Indies in India where Dhoni scored 146 runs across the five innings he batted.

=== Test retirement and 2015 World cup ===
Dhoni played his last series during India's tour of Australia in December 2014. Following the third Test in Melbourne, Dhoni announced his retirement from the format. In his last test, he effected nine dismissals (eight catches and a stumping), and in the process, went past Kumar Sangakkara's record for most stumpings in international cricket and also set a record for effecting the most dismissals in a match by an Indian wicketkeeper until it was broken by Wriddhiman Saha in 2018. In the Carlton Mid triangular series in Australia, India failed to win a single match with Dhoni himself managing just 70 runs from three innings at an average of 23.34.

During the 2015 Cricket World Cup, Dhoni became the first Indian captain to win all group stage matches in a world cup. In the match against Zimbabwe at Auckland, he made 85 which was the highest score by an Indian captain in New Zealand. After beating Bangladesh in the quarter finals, he became the third overall and the first non-Australian captain to win 100 ODI matches. India lost to eventual champions Australia in the semi-finals with Dhoni having a good series, scoring 237 runs in six innings at an average of 59.25 and a strike rate of 102.15, and thus, becoming the second Indian captain to have an average over 50 and strike rate over 100 in a particular season of the World Cup.

=== Final years and retirement ===
Dhoni led India to victory in the 2016 Asia Cup, where India remained unbeaten. Dhoni stepped down as the captain of India in January 2017, ahead of the ODI series at home against England. In the second game of the series, he scored 134 off 122 balls, his tenth century in ODIs and his first in over three years. He was named as a wicket-keeper of the 'Team of the Tournament' at the 2017 ICC Champions Trophy in which India finished as runners-up. In August 2017, during the fifth and final ODI against Sri Lanka in Colombo, he became the first wicket-keeper to effect 100 stumpings in ODIs when he stumped Akila Dananjaya off Yuzvendra Chahal. He reached the milestone of effecting 400 dismissals in ODIs in February 2018, following the stumping of Aiden Markram in the third ODI of the South Africa tour.

Though, he had a relatively mediocre series scoring 79 runs in two innings at a strike rate of 63.20 during India's 2018 tour of England, he went past 10,000 ODI runs, becoming the fourth Indian and twelfth overall to do so. In the 2018 Asia Cup title winning campaign, he scored just 77 runs in four innings at an average of 19.25. While captaining in the group stage match against Afghanistan due to regular captain Rohit Sharma being unavailable, Dhoni became the first cricketer to lead India 200 times in ODIs. Dhoni aggregated 50 runs from three innings in the home series against West Indies. In the series, he effected the fastest stumping in the history of cricket, clocked at 0.08 seconds, when dismissing Keemo Paul.

Dhoni was not selected for the T20I squad for the series that followed and the Australia tour later that season. However, he was included in the squad for the ODI series in Australia. In the three-match series, Dhoni scored half-centuries in all three games with the latter two resulting in wins, helping India secure a 2–1 series victory, their first in a bilateral series on Australian soil and was named player of the series while also becoming the fourth Indian to score more than 1,000 ODI runs in Australia. In April 2019, he was named in India's squad for the 2019 Cricket World Cup. On 9 July 2019, Dhoni played in his 350th and final ODI in the semi-final loss against New Zealand. On 15 August 2020, Dhoni formally announced his retirement from international cricket.

=== Post-international retirement ===
On 8 September 2021, Dhoni was appointed as the mentor of the Indian team for the 2021 T20 World Cup.

== Domestic career ==
Dhoni played for Bihar state cricket team since 1999 before representing Jharkhand later. He has also played for Rajasthan Cricket Association President's XI, East zone and Rest of India in domestic cricket. In BCCI Corporate trophy, he played for Air India until his resignation from the company in 2013. In February 2005, Dhoni played for India seniors in Challenger trophy, where he scored 102 against India B. Jharkhand State Cricket Association (JSCA) appointed him captain of the Jharkhand team in February 2017 for the 2017-18 Vijay Hazare trophy and on 25 February 2017, he scored his first ever domestic list-A century against Chhattisgarh and led the team to the quarter final where Jharkhand lost against Delhi.

== Franchise career ==
Chennai Super Kings

T20 Cricket

Indian Premier League
| Winner | 2010, 2011, 2018, 2021, 2023 | |
| Runner-up | 2008, 2012, 2013, 2015, 2019 | |

Champions League
| Winner | 2010, 2014 | |

Rising Pune Supergiants

T20 Cricket

Indian Premier League
| Runner-up | 2017 | |

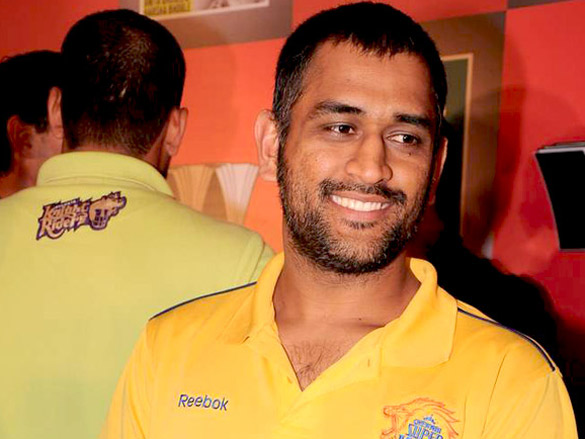
Dhoni with Chennai Super Kings in 2011

Dhoni was acquired by Chennai Super Kings (CSK) for US$1.5 million during the auction for the inaugural season of the Indian Premier League (IPL). He was the most expensive signing in the auction. Dhoni scored 414 runs to lead CSK to the finals in the first season of IPL. Under his captaincy, CSK won the 2010 edition and qualified for Champions League Twenty20. Chennai won the 2010 Champions league. Dhoni scored 392 runs and led CSK to its second consecutive IPL title in 2011. Dhoni led CSK to its second Champions League Twenty20 title in 2014. Dhoni scored 2987 runs from 129 matches in the IPL across the first eight seasons for the Super Kings.

Following the two-year suspension of Chennai Super Kings and Rajasthan Royals, two new franchises Rising Pune Supergiants and Gujarat Lions were established for the 2016 Indian Premier League season. Supergiants picked Dhoni as one of their five draft picks on 15 December 2015 for ₹125 million (US$1.3 million). He scored 574 runs in 30 matches across two seasons for the Supergiants.

Dhoni returned to CSK for the 2018 season. He scored 455 runs and led his team to its third IPL title. Dhoni led CSK to the title again in 2021 and was retained for ₹12 crore (US$1.3 million) before the auction for the 2022 season. Dhoni stepped down from captaincy ahead of that season and Ravindra Jadeja was appointed the new captain. However, a month later, Jadeja handed over the captaincy back to Dhoni in the middle of the season. Dhoni led the franchise to victory again the following season. Under his captaincy, CSK became the most successful IPL franchise with five title wins and ten final appearances. Dhoni became the first player to play 200 T20 matches for CSK and holds the record for most appearances in the IPL. Ahead of the 2024 season, Dhoni handed over captaincy to Ruturaj Gaikwad. He marked his 250th appearance for CSK in that season, in a league stage match against Mumbai Indians on 14 April 2024, helping his team secure a 20-run win, following his unbeaten four-ball 20. During the 2025 season, Gaikwad was ruled out for the rest of the season due to injury and Dhoni served as the stand-in captain. Dhoni announced his retirement from IPL on 17 November 2026, and was announced as the mentor for CSK.

== Outside cricket ==
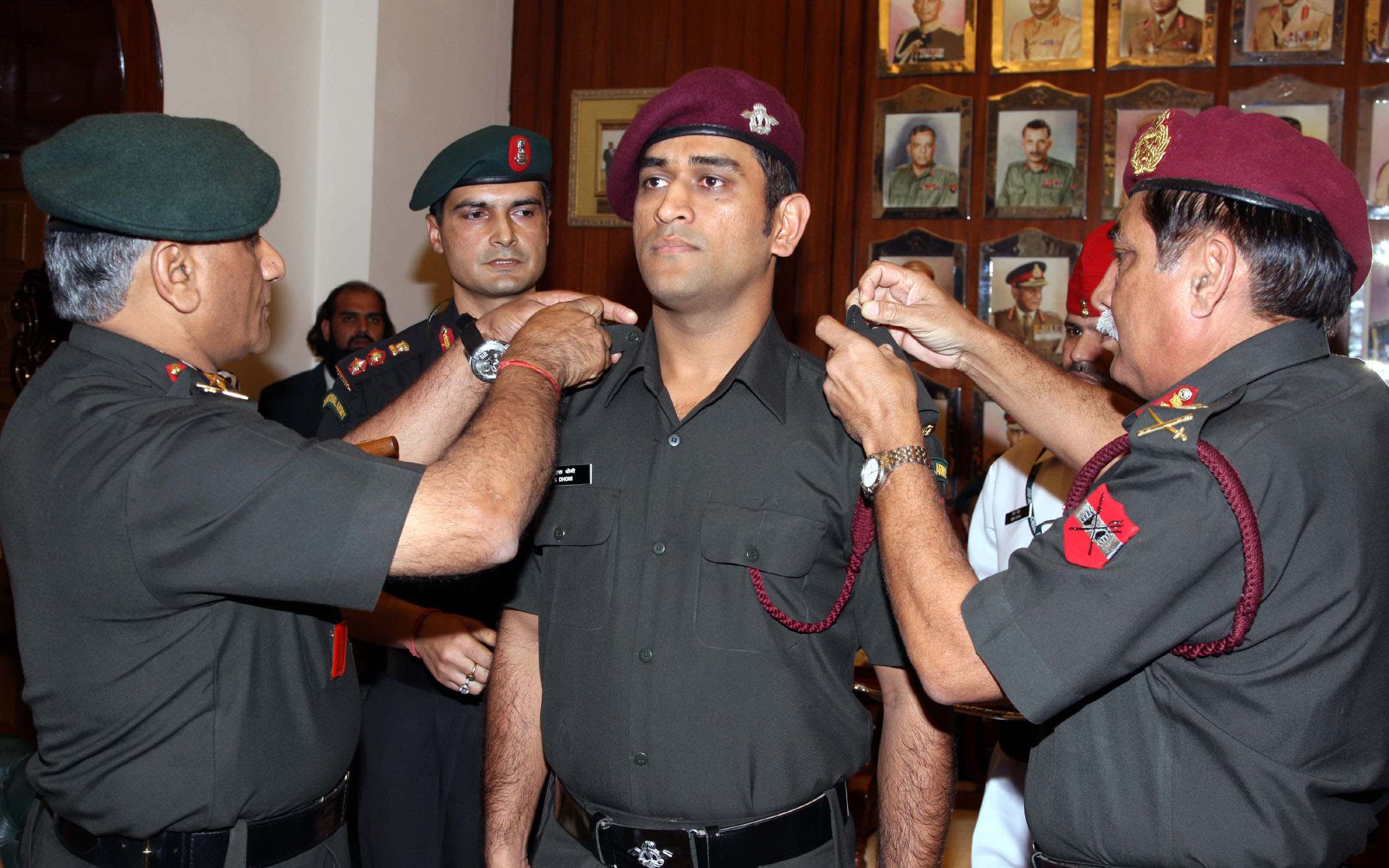
General V. K. Singh, the Chief of Army Staff, bestowing the honorary rank of Lieutenant Colonel to Dhoni

Dhoni holds an honorary rank of Lieutenant colonel in the Parachute Regiment of the Indian Territorial Army (106 Para TA battalion). The honorary rank was presented to him by the Indian Army in 2011 for his service to the nation as a cricketer. After completing five parachute training jumps from Indian Army aircraft in the Agra training camp, he became a qualified paratrooper in 2015. In August 2019, he completed a two-week stint with the Territorial Army in Jammu and Kashmir. While spending a day with the parachute regiment in Ranchi, Dhoni said that he wanted to become a soldier and not a cricketer, "Since childhood I wanted to join the Army. Seeing the soldiers, I thought that one day I'll be the same".

Dhoni holds the post of vice-president in India Cements, the company owned by former BCCI president N. Srinivasan. Dhoni is a co-owner of Chennai-based football club Chennaiyin FC, a franchise of the Indian Super League. He also co-owns Ranchi-based hockey club Ranchi Rays, a franchise of the Hockey India League. In February 2016, Dhoni launched lifestyle brand SEVEN which he co-owns while also serving as its brand ambassador. In 2019, Dhoni invested in vehicle re-seller CARS24 and simultaneously became brand ambassador of the company. On 11 October 2022, Dhoni invested in Shaka Harry, a plant-based protein company.

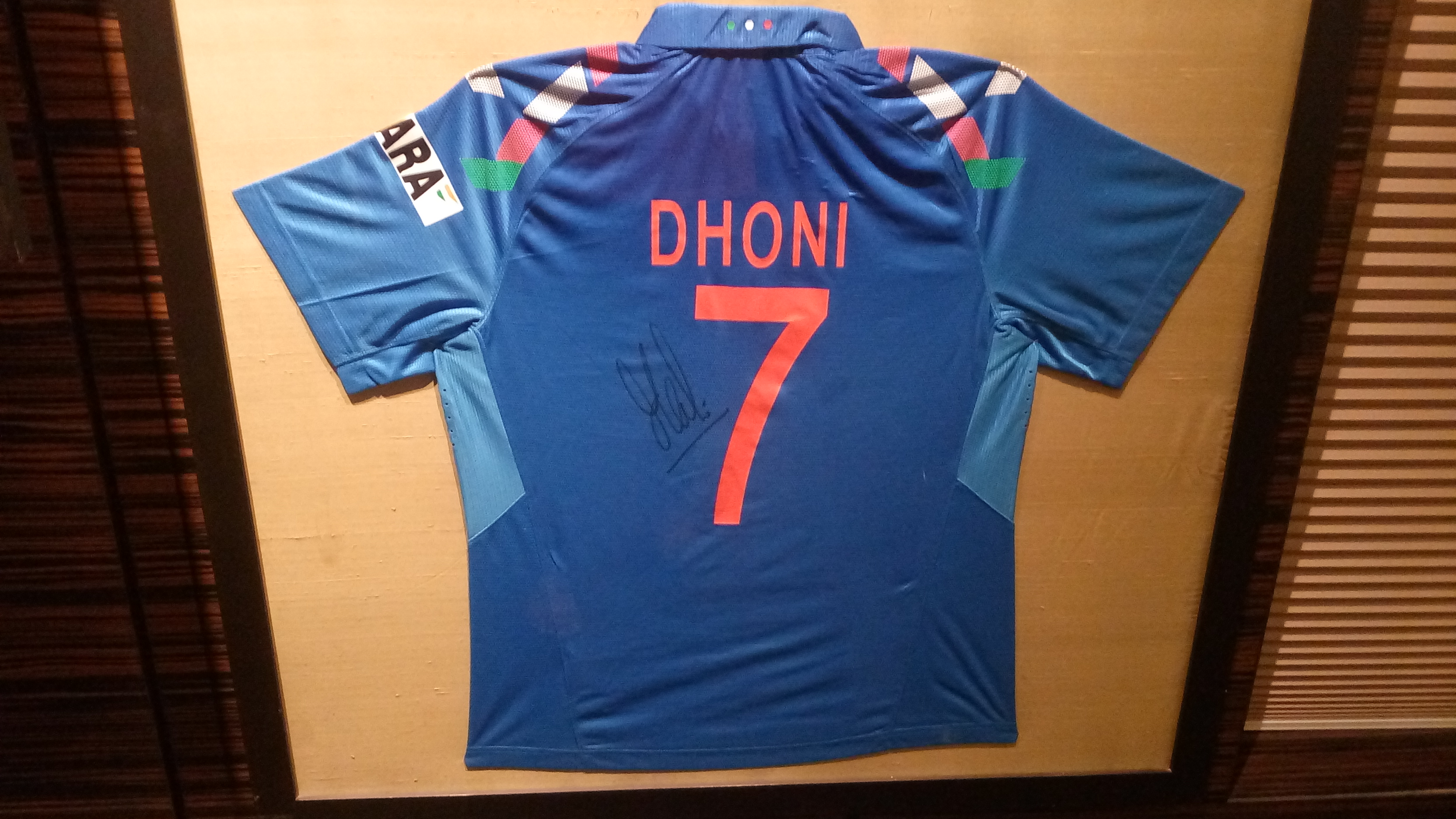
The No.7 jersey of the Indian cricket team made popular by Dhoni

In 2019, Dhoni Entertainment entered into a long-term business agreement with Banijay Asia to produce content across various genres. The first show developed by the company was a documentary web series titled Roar of The Lion for Disney+ Hotstar in 2019 which dealt with the ban of Chennai Super Kings from the Indian Premier League in 2016 and their return to win the title in 2018. The production house produced a Tamil language romantic drama LGM which was released on 28 July 2023. Dhoni performed a special cameo appearance in Vijay's film G.O.A.T that was released on 5 September 2024.

Dhoni is one of the most popular cricketers in the world. As of 2022, Dhoni has more than 75 million followers on social media platforms and his brand value was projected to be $80.3 million by Duff and Phelps. Dhoni's popularity is often compared to Sachin Tendulkar, the highest run scorer in international cricket. The No.7 jersey was made popular by Dhoni and was retired by the BCCI in 2023 as an honour to him. Dhoni has developed a special connection with the city of Chennai whose IPL franchise he represents and the fans often call him 'Thala' meaning leader in Tamil.

== Playing style ==
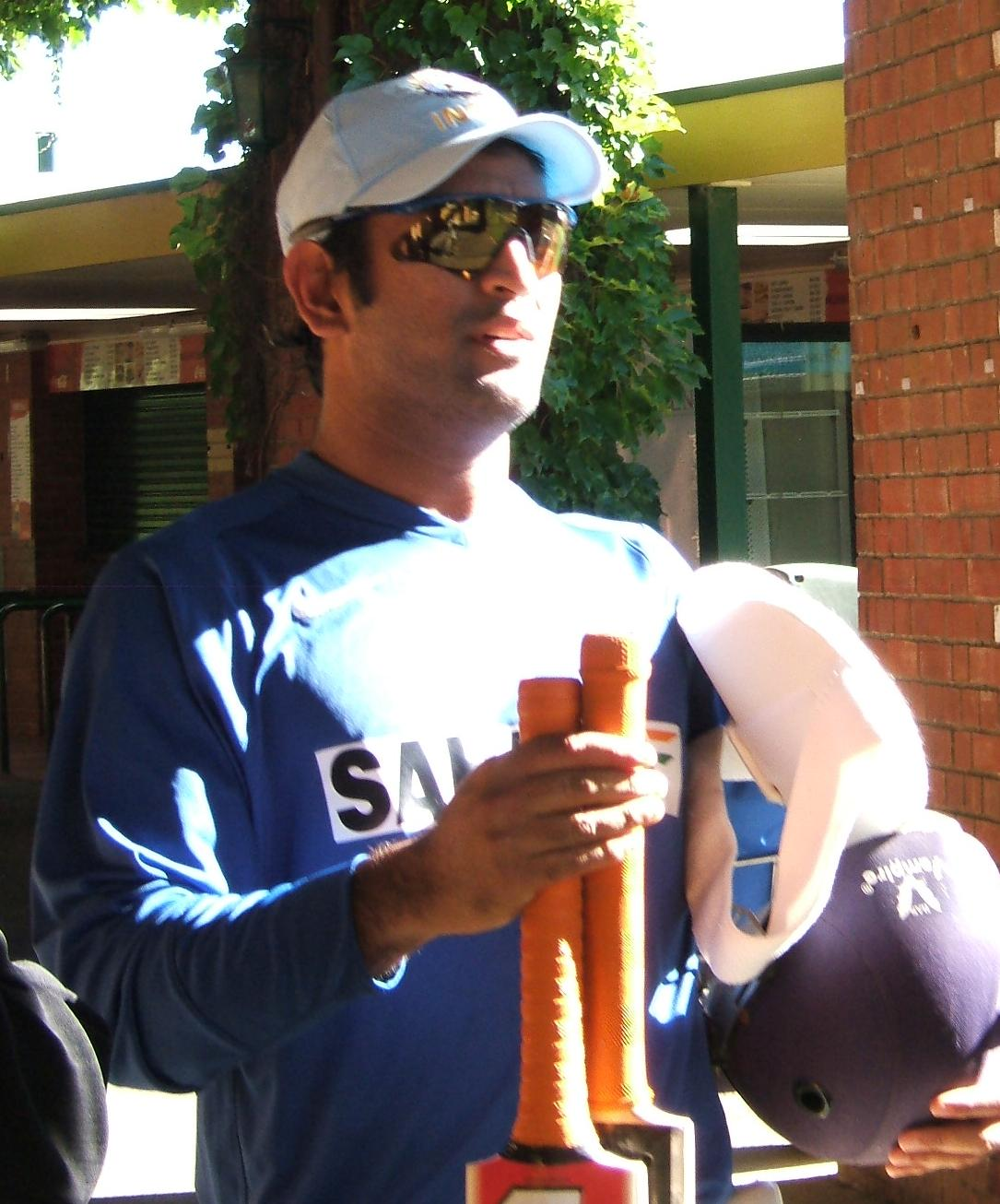
Dhoni in 2008

Dhoni is a right-handed batsman and wicket-keeper. Dhoni is an unorthodox batsman who deviates from conventional coaching manuals to showcase his batting technique. Dhoni displays a proclivity for hitting full-length deliveries towards the Long-on, Long-off, and Midwicket regions, rather than the conventional Cover region. He plays pull shots and hook shots off short-pitched deliveries often putting pressure on the bowler to adjust their line and length accordingly. Dhoni holds the bat with a firm grip at the bottom of the handle, striking the ball with force and precision to clear the boundary. He is a powerful hitter of the ball and is one of the fastest men in running between the wickets. He plays the helicopter shot technique, taught to him by a fellow player and childhood friend Santosh Lal. As a batsman, he is recognised for his finishing skills in high-pressure situations.

As a wicket-keeper, he has been praised for his fast reflexes behind the stumps, though he was also criticised early in his career for a lack of good technique. He is known for his unorthodox captaincy, approachability and has earned a reputation of being a successful leader. Dhoni is also known for his cool-headed demeanor on the field which has earned him the monicker "Captain cool".

== Personal life ==
Dhoni married Sakshi Singh Rawat on 4 July 2010 in Dehradun. Dhoni and his wife have a daughter, who was born on 6 February 2015. He lives in his farmhouse in Ranchi. Dhoni is an automotive enthusiast and owns a number of bikes and cars in his collection.

== Career statistics ==
Dhoni has scored 4876 runs in Test matches at an average of 38 and 10773 runs at an average of above 50 in ODIs. He has scored 16 centuries and 108 fifties in his international career. Dhoni has one of the highest averages in ODI cricket. He has scored more than 7400 runs across 390 T20 matches. He has taken 634 catches and effected 195 stumpings in his international career, making him one of the most prolific wicket-keepers of all time.

Dhoni's ODI record
| Venue | Mat | Runs | Best | Bat Avg. | SR | 100s | 50s | 4s | 6s | Catches | Stumpings |
|---|---|---|---|---|---|---|---|---|---|---|---|
| Home | 127 | 4,351 | 183* | 53.71 | 91.60 | 7 | 25 | 350 | 116 | 99 | 48 |
| Away | 145 | 4,520 | 101* | 50.78 | 83.98 | 1 | 37 | 324 | 73 | 126 | 46 |
| Neutral | 78 | 1,902 | 139* | 44.23 | 87.60 | 2 | 11 | 152 | 40 | 96 | 29 |
| Total | 350 | 10,773 | 183* | 50.57 | 87.56 | 10 | 73 | 826 | 229 | 321 | 123 |

=== Captaincy ===
In 2007, Dhoni was appointed captain of the Indian team and served as the captain of all formats from 2008. He captained the Indian team in 332 matches including 200 ODIs and was one of the most prolific and successful captains of all time.

Dhoni captaincy record
| Type | Matches | Won | Lost | Drawn | Tied | No result | Win% |
|---|---|---|---|---|---|---|---|
| Test | 60 | 27 | 18 | 15 | – | – | 45% |
| ODI | 200 | 110 | 74 | – | 5 | 11 | 55% |
| T20I | 72 | 42 | 28 | – | – | 2 | 58.33% |
| Total | 332 | 179 | 120 | 15 | 5 | 13 | 53.91% |

== Records and achievements ==
Tests

- Most runs by an Indian wicket-keeper (4876)
- Most number of sixes by an Indian captain (51)
- Most dismissals by an Indian and fifth most by any wicket-keeper (294)

ODIs

- Most wins by an Indian captain and second most overall (110)
- Second most runs as captain (6641)
- Third most number of matches as captain (200)
- First player to pass 10,000 runs with an average of over 50
- Most not-outs (84)
- Highest score by a wicket-keeper (183*)
- Highest eighth wicket partnership for India (100* with Bhuvneshwar Kumar)
- Most dismissals in an innings (6) and career (432) by an Indian wicket-keeper
- Most stumpings by any wicket-keeper (123)

T20Is

- Second most matches as captain (72)
- Most T20I innings (76) and runs (1,153) before scoring a fifty
- Most stumpings as wicket-keeper (34)
- Most catches as wicket keeper in a T20I innings (5)

Combined

- Most international matches as captain (332)
- Most stumpings (195) and only wicket-keeper to make 150 stumpings
- Third most dismissals as a wicket-keeper (829)
- Sixth most sixes in career (359)

== Awards and honours ==
=== India ===
- T20 World Cup: 2007
- Asia Cup: 2010, 2016 2018
- Cricket World Cup: 2011
- ICC Champions Trophy: 2013

=== Chennai Super Kings ===
- Indian Premier League: 2010, 2011, 2018, 2021, 2023
- Champions League: 2010, 2014

=== Individual ===
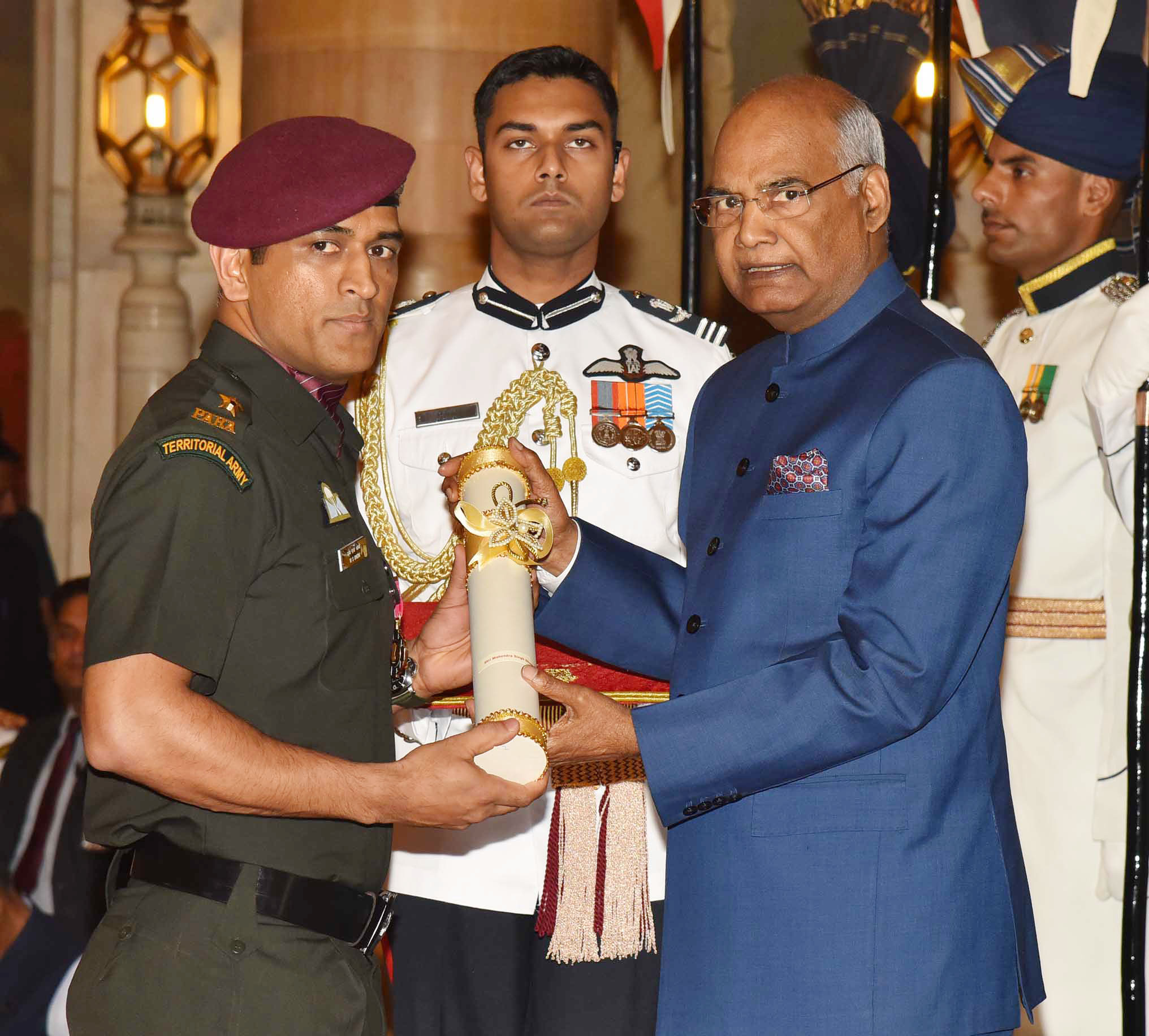
Dhoni receiving the Padma Bhushan award from then President of India, Ram Nath Kovind, in April 2018

- MTV Youth Icon of the Year: 2006
- ICC Men's ODI Team of the Year: 2006, 2008, 2009, 2010, 2011, 2012, 2013, 2014 (captain in 2009, 2011–2014)
- ICC Men's Test Team of the Year: 2009, 2010, 2013 (captain in 2009, 2010)
- Khel Ratna Award: 2008
- ICC ODI Cricketer of the Year: 2008, 2009
- Padma Shri: 2009
- Honorary Lieutenant Colonel, Parachute Regiment of the Indian Territorial Army: 2011
- CNN-News18 Indian of the Year: 2011
- Castrol Indian Cricketer of the Year: 2011
- ICC People's Choice Award: 2013
- Padma Bhushan: 2018
- ICC Men's ODI team of the decade: 2011–2020 (captain and wicket-keeper)
- ICC Men's T20I team of the decade: 2011–2020 (captain and wicket-keeper)
- ICC Spirit of cricket award of the decade: 2011–2020
- ICC Cricket Hall of Fame: 2025

Others

Dhoni was awarded an honorary doctorate by De Montfort University in 2011. In 2019, Jharkhand Cricket Association named the JSCA stadium's south stand after Dhoni. In 2023, the Mumbai Cricket Association (MCA) decided to honour him by dedicating seats (J282–J286) at the Wankhede Stadium where he hit the winning shot in 2011 World Cup final.

== In popular culture ==
- A film based on Dhoni's life from his childhood to the 2011 world cup win, titled M.S. Dhoni: The Untold Story, with Sushant Singh Rajput in the lead role was released on 29 September 2016.
- The Dhoni Touch: unravelling the enigma that is Mahendra Singh Dhoni, a book by Bharat Sundaresan.
- Dhoni (2012), a Tamil feature film, directed and produced by Prakash Raj where the plot illustrates the conflicting interests of a father and his son with the father wanting his son to study MBA but his son wanting to become a cricketer like Dhoni.

Sporting positions
| Preceded by Anil Kumble | Indian Test Captain; 2008–2014 | Succeeded by Virat Kohli |
| Preceded by Rahul Dravid | Indian ODI captain 2007–2016 | Succeeded by Virat Kohli |
| Preceded by Virender Sehwag | Indian T20I Captain; 2007–2016 | Succeeded by Virat Kohli |
