= 2006–07 Euroleague Regular Season Group C =

Standings and results for Group C of the Regular Season phase of the 2006-07 Euroleague basketball tournament.

Key to colors
Top five places in each group, plus highest-ranked sixth-place team, advance to Top 16
Eliminated

Tiebreakers:

- Head-to-head record in matches between the tied clubs
- Overall point difference in games between the tied clubs
- Overall point difference in all group matches (first tiebreaker if tied clubs are not in the same group)
- Points scored in all group matches
- Sum of quotients of points scored and points allowed in each group match

== Standings ==
	Team	Pld	W	L	PF	PA	Diff
1.	(Russia) CSKA Moscow	14	13	1	1079	912	167
2.	(Spain) Winterthur FCB	14	9	5	1093	1032	61
3.	(Italy) Benetton Treviso	14	8	6	1021	989	32
4.	(France) Pau-Orthez	14	7	7	1059	1070	-11
5.	(Greece) Aris TT Bank	14	6	8	971	1013	-42
6.	(Italy) Eldo Napoli	14	6	8	1032	1093	-61
7.	(Turkey) Fenerbahçe	14	5	9	1044	1088	-44
8.	(Lithuania) Žalgiris	14	2	12	1062	1164	-102

Notes:

- Aris win the fifth-place tiebreaker over Eldo; the clubs split their games, but Aris scored 6 more head-to-head points than Eldo.
- Eldo lost the tiebreaker with Partizan in Group B for the best sixth-place record, as Partizan had an overall points difference in group play of +7 to Eldo's -61.

=== Fixtures and results ===
* = Overtime (one star per overtime period)

Game 1, October 25–26, 2006

Aris TT Bank (Greece)	66 – 58	(Turkey) Fenerbahçe	October 25, 2006
Pau-Orthez (France)	66 – 72	(Spain) Winterthur FCB	October 25, 2006
Eldo Napoli (Italy)	64 – 74	(Russia) CSKA Moscow	October 25, 2006
Benetton Treviso (Italy)	95 – 82	(Lithuania) Žalgiris	October 26, 2006

Game 2, November 1–2, 2006

CSKA Moscow (Russia)	83 – 68	(Greece) Aris TT Bank	November 1, 2006
Fenerbahçe (Turkey)	66 – 68	(France) Pau-Orthez	November 1, 2006
Žalgiris (Lithuania)	83 – 65	(Italy) Eldo Napoli	November 2, 2006
Winterthur FCB (Spain)	82 – 69	(Italy) Benetton Treviso	November 2, 2006

Game 3, November 8–9, 2006

Eldo Napoli (Italy)	71 – 69	(Greece) Aris TT Bank	November 8, 2006
Pau-Orthez (France)	73 – 67	(Russia) CSKA Moscow	November 8, 2006
Benetton Treviso (Italy)	93 – 83	(Turkey) Fenerbahçe	November 8, 2006
Žalgiris (Lithuania)	86 – 92	(Spain) Winterthur FCB	November 9, 2006

Game 4, November 15–16, 2006

CSKA Moscow (Russia)	83 – 67	(Italy) Benetton Treviso	November 15, 2006
Aris TT Bank (Greece)	74 – 72	(France) Pau-Orthez	November 15, 2006
Fenerbahçe (Turkey)	84 – 75	(Lithuania) Žalgiris	November 16, 2006
Winterthur FCB (Spain)	91 – 71	(Italy) Eldo Napoli	November 16, 2006

Game 5, November 22–23, 2006

Žalgiris (Lithuania)	59 – 78	(Russia) CSKA Moscow	November 23, 2006
Benetton Treviso (Italy)	64 – 42	(Greece) Aris TT Bank	November 23, 2006
Winterthur FCB (Spain)	84 – 70	(Turkey) Fenerbahçe	November 23, 2006
Eldo Napoli (Italy)	84 – 96	(France) Pau-Orthez	November 23, 2006

Game 6, November 29–30, 2006

CSKA Moscow (Russia)	76 – 57	(Spain) Winterthur FCB	November 29, 2006
Aris TT Bank (Greece)	73 – 66	(Lithuania) Žalgiris	November 30, 2006
Eldo Napoli (Italy)	78 – 83*	(Turkey) Fenerbahçe	November 30, 2006
Pau-Orthez (France)	73 – 86	(Italy) Benetton Treviso	November 30, 2006

Game 7, December 6–7, 2006

Fenerbahçe (Turkey)	74 – 84	(Russia) CSKA Moscow	December 6, 2006
Žalgiris (Lithuania)	106 – 110**	(France) Pau-Orthez	December 7, 2006
Benetton Treviso (Italy)	64 – 70	(Italy) Eldo Napoli	December 7, 2006
Winterthur FCB (Spain)	86 – 83	(Greece) Aris TT Bank	December 7, 2006

Game 8, December 13–14, 2006

Fenerbahçe (Turkey)	80 – 86	(Greece) Aris TT Bank	December 13, 2006
CSKA Moscow (Russia)	82 – 72	(Italy) Eldo Napoli	December 13, 2006
Žalgiris (Lithuania)	76 – 86	(Italy) Benetton Treviso	December 14, 2006
Winterthur FCB (Spain)	93 – 75	(France) Pau-Orthez	December 14, 2006

Game 9, December 20–21, 2006

Aris TT Bank (Greece)	62 – 65	(Russia) CSKA Moscow	December 20, 2006
Pau-Orthez (France)	89 – 67	(Turkey) Fenerbahçe	December 21, 2006
Benetton Treviso (Italy)	68 – 67	(Spain) Winterthur FCB	December 21, 2006
Eldo Napoli (Italy)	92 – 87	(Lithuania) Žalgiris	December 21, 2006

Game 10, January 3–4, 2007

CSKA Moscow (Russia)	78 – 58	(France) Pau-Orthez	January 3, 2007
Fenerbahçe (Turkey)	70 – 58	(Italy) Benetton Treviso	January 3, 2007
Aris TT Bank (Greece)	80 – 72	(Italy) Eldo Napoli	January 3, 2007
Winterthur FCB (Spain)	84 – 67	(Lithuania) Žalgiris	January 3, 2007

Game 11, January 10–11, 2007

Pau-Orthez (France)	77 – 62	(Greece) Aris TT Bank	January 10, 2007
Benetton Treviso (Italy)	60 – 68	(Russia) CSKA Moscow	January 10, 2007
Žalgiris (Lithuania)	70 – 83	(Turkey) Fenerbahçe	January 11, 2007
Eldo Napoli (Italy)	66 – 64	(Spain) Winterthur FCB	January 11, 2007

Game 12, January 17–18, 2007

CSKA Moscow (Russia)	88 – 72	(Lithuania) Žalgiris	January 17, 2007
Pau-Orthez (France)	68 – 72	(Italy) Eldo Napoli	January 17, 2007
Fenerbahçe (Turkey)	82 – 69	(Spain) Winterthur FCB	January 18, 2007
Aris TT Bank (Greece)	65 – 60	(Italy) Benetton Treviso	January 18, 2007

Game 13, January 24–25, 2007

Benetton Treviso (Italy)	87 – 66	(France) Pau-Orthez	January 24, 2007
Fenerbahçe (Turkey)	88 – 93*	(Italy) Eldo Napoli	January 25, 2007
Žalgiris (Lithuania)	77 – 66	(Greece) Aris TT Bank	January 25, 2007
Winterthur FCB (Spain)	70 – 78*	(Russia) CSKA Moscow	January 25, 2007

Game 14, January 31 - February 1, 2007

Eldo Napoli (Italy)	62 – 64	(Italy) Benetton Treviso	January 31, 2007
Pau-Orthez (France)	68 – 56	(Lithuania) Žalgiris	January 31, 2007
Aris TT Bank (Greece)	75 – 82*	(Spain) Winterthur FCB	January 31, 2007
CSKA Moscow (Russia)	85 – 66	(Turkey) Fenerbahçe	January 31, 2007
