= Helicopter shot =

Unconventional batting shot in cricket

In cricket, the helicopter shot is the act of hitting the ball by means of a wristy flick, using the bottom-hand as the dominant force. The shot gets its name from the flourish completing the stroke, with the bat being circled overhead. It has been considered an unconventional and innovative stroke which, when executed effectively, can be used to score boundaries, even against good yorkers or fuller-length deliveries, which have traditionally been used by faster bowlers towards the end of limited-overs matches because it is difficult to hit such balls to the boundary.

Mohammad Azharuddin played a shot similar to the helicopter shot against the South African team in 1990 at Eden Gardens. Sachin Tendulkar, Aravinda Silva, Kevin Pietersen, Chamara Silva, Abdul Razzaq are some of those players who played similar shots, although, they all just played on the merit of the ball and not intentionally as a particular shot itself and that too for only once or twice. The shot got its name and fame through M. S. Dhoni, who played it on a regular basis as a way to score boundaries against full and yorker length deliveries. It was a fellow player Santosh Lal, a childhood friend of Dhoni, who taught him how to play the shot.

== See also ==
- Cricket terminology
- Batting (cricket)
- Leg side
