= Santosh Lal =

Indian cricketer (1983–2013)

Personal information
- Full name: Santosh Lal
- Born: 4 December 1983; Ranchi, India
- Died: 17 July 2013 (aged 29); Delhi, India
- Batting: Right-handed
- Source: Cricinfo, 1 June 2016

Santosh Lal (4 December 1983 – 17 July 2013) was an Indian cricketer. He played eight first-class matches for Jharkhand between 2004 and 2008. He was a childhood friend of MS Dhoni, whom he taught how to play the helicopter shot. Lal died of pancreatitis aged 29.
