= 2006–07 Euroleague Regular Season Group A =

Standings and results for Group A of the Regular Season phase of the 2006-07 Euroleague basketball tournament.

Key to colors
Top five places in each group, plus highest-ranked sixth-place team, advance to Top 16
Eliminated

Tiebreakers:

- Head-to-head record in matches between the tied clubs
- Overall point difference in games between the tied clubs
- Overall point difference in all group matches (first tiebreaker if tied clubs are not in the same group)
- Points scored in all group matches
- Sum of quotients of points scored and points allowed in each group match

== Standings ==
	Team	Pld	W	L	PF	PA	Diff
1.	(Spain) TAU Cerámica	14	12	2	1165	1025	140
2.	(Russia) Dynamo Moscow	14	10	4	1100	1032	68
3.	(Greece) Olympiacos	14	10	4	1165	1112	53
4.	(Turkey) Efes Pilsen	14	8	6	1081	1031	50
5.	(Poland) Prokom Trefl	14	5	9	1021	1063	-42
6.	(Italy) Climamio Bologna	14	5	9	1115	1176	-61
7.	(France) Le Mans	14	4	10	985	1041	-56
8.	(Germany) RheinEnergie	14	2	12	1032	1184	-152

Notes:

- Dynamo win the tiebreaker over Olympiacos for second place, and a top seed in the Top 16 phase. The two teams split their group matches, but Dynamo scored 2 more points head-to-head.
- Prokom win the tiebreaker over Climamio for fifth place and a Top 16 berth. The two teams split their group matches, but Prokom scored 8 more points head-to-head.

=== Fixtures and results ===
Game 1, October 25–26, 2006

Olympiacos (Greece)	97 – 78	(Spain) TAU Cerámica	October 25, 2006
Dynamo Moscow (Russia)	75 – 68	(Germany) RheinEnergie	October 26, 2006
Efes Pilsen (Turkey)	71 – 67	(Poland) Prokom Trefl	October 26, 2006
Le Mans (France)	82 – 71	(Italy) Climamio Bologna	October 26, 2006

Game 2, November 1–2, 2006

TAU Cerámica (Spain)	77 – 61	(Russia) Dynamo Moscow	November 1, 2006
Climamio Bologna (Italy)	86 – 93	(Greece) Olympiacos	November 1, 2006
Prokom Trefl (Poland)	69 – 67	(France) Le Mans	November 2, 2006
RheinEnergie (Germany)	68 – 82	(Turkey) Efes Pilsen	November 2, 2006

Game 3, November 8–9, 2006

RheinEnergie (Germany)	70 – 102	(Spain) TAU Cerámica	November 8, 2006
Efes Pilsen (Turkey)	53 – 64	(France) Le Mans	November 9, 2006
Olympiacos (Greece)	97 – 74	(Poland) Prokom Trefl	November 9, 2006
Dynamo Moscow (Russia)	78 – 73	(Italy) Climamio Bologna	November 9, 2006

Game 4, November 15–16, 2006

TAU Cerámica (Spain)	68 – 65	(Turkey) Efes Pilsen	November 15, 2006
Prokom Trefl (Poland)	60 – 49	(Russia) Dynamo Moscow	November 16, 2006
Le Mans (France)	81 – 88	(Greece) Olympiacos	November 16, 2006
Climamio Bologna (Italy)	86 – 90	(Germany) RheinEnergie	November 16, 2006

Game 5, November 22–23, 2006

Dynamo Moscow (Russia)	74 – 57	(France) Le Mans	November 22, 2006
Efes Pilsen (Turkey)	95 – 77	(Greece) Olympiacos	November 22, 2006
TAU Cerámica (Spain)	90 – 80	(Italy) Climamio Bologna	November 22, 2006
RheinEnergie (Germany)	84 – 80	(Poland) Prokom Trefl	November 23, 2006

Game 6, November 29–30, 2006

Efes Pilsen (Turkey)	72 – 74	(Italy) Climamio Bologna	November 29, 2006
RheinEnergie (Germany)	73 – 79	(France) Le Mans	November 30, 2006
Prokom Trefl (Poland)	70 – 75	(Spain) TAU Cerámica	November 30, 2006
Olympiacos (Greece)	86 – 73	(Russia) Dynamo Moscow	November 30, 2006

Game 7, December 6–7, 2006

RheinEnergie (Germany)	81 – 88	(Greece) Olympiacos	December 6, 2006
Le Mans (France)	76 – 79	(Spain) TAU Cerámica	December 6, 2006
Climamio Bologna (Italy)	77 – 91	(Poland) Prokom Trefl	December 6, 2006
Dynamo Moscow (Russia)	90 – 83	(Turkey) Efes Pilsen	December 7, 2006

Game 8, December 13–14, 2006

Climamio Bologna (Italy)	83 – 71	(France) Le Mans	December 13, 2006
TAU Cerámica (Spain)	89 – 74	(Greece) Olympiacos	December 13, 2006
Prokom Trefl (Poland)	74 – 81	(Turkey) Efes Pilsen	December 14, 2006
RheinEnergie (Germany)	82 – 96	(Russia) Dynamo Moscow	December 14, 2006

Game 9, December 20–21, 2006

Dynamo Moscow (Russia)	78 – 82	(Spain) TAU Cerámica	December 20, 2006
Efes Pilsen (Turkey)	91 – 76	(Germany) RheinEnergie	December 20, 2006
Olympiacos (Greece)	94 – 67	(Italy) Climamio Bologna	December 20, 2006
Le Mans (France)	73 – 84	(Poland) Prokom Trefl	December 20, 2006

Game 10, January 3–4, 2007

TAU Cerámica (Spain)	97 – 68	(Germany) RheinEnergie	January 3, 2007
Prokom Trefl (Poland)	64 – 73	(Greece) Olympiacos	January 4, 2007
Le Mans (France)	67 – 71	(Turkey) Efes Pilsen	January 4, 2007
Climamio Bologna (Italy)	80 – 101	(Russia) Dynamo Moscow	January 4, 2007

Game 11, January 10–11, 2007

Efes Pilsen (Turkey)	78 – 84	(Spain) TAU Cerámica	January 10, 2007
RheinEnergie (Germany)	78 – 90	(Italy) Climamio Bologna	January 10, 2007
Dynamo Moscow (Russia)	95 – 74	(Poland) Prokom Trefl	January 11, 2007
Olympiacos (Greece)	80 – 76	(France) Le Mans	January 11, 2007

Game 12, January 17–18, 2007

Olympiacos (Greece)	72 – 91	(Turkey) Efes Pilsen	January 17, 2007
Climamio Bologna (Italy)	90 – 82	(Spain) TAU Cerámica	January 17, 2007
Prokom Trefl (Poland)	72 – 61	(Germany) RheinEnergie	January 18, 2007
Le Mans (France)	69 – 70	(Russia) Dynamo Moscow	January 18, 2007

Game 13, January 24–25, 2007

Climamio Bologna (Italy)	74 – 76	(Turkey) Efes Pilsen	January 24, 2007
TAU Cerámica (Spain)	76 – 64	(Poland) Prokom Trefl	January 24, 2007
Dynamo Moscow (Russia)	84 – 69	(Greece) Olympiacos	January 25, 2007
Le Mans (France)	69 – 60	(Germany) RheinEnergie	January 25, 2007

Game 14, January 31 - February 1, 2007

TAU Cerámica (Spain)	86 – 54	(France) Le Mans	February 1, 2007
Efes Pilsen (Turkey)	72 – 76	(Russia) Dynamo Moscow	February 1, 2007
Olympiacos (Greece)	77 – 73	(Germany) RheinEnergie	February 1, 2007
Prokom Trefl (Poland)	78 – 84	(Italy) Climamio Bologna	February 1, 2007
