= Sri Lankan cricket team in India in 2006–07 =

- Date: 8 – 17 February 2007
- Location: India
- Result: India won the 4-match ODI series 2–1
- Player of the series: (India) Sourav Ganguly
Teams
- India: Sri Lanka
Captains
- Rahul Dravid: Mahela Jayawardene
Most runs
- Sourav Ganguly (168) Yuvraj Singh (116) Mahendra Singh Dhoni (115): T Dilshan (126); Kumar Sangakkara (123); Chamara Silva (107)
Most wickets
- Munaf Patel (7) Zaheer Khan (7) S Sreesanth (4): Farveez Maharoof (4); Dilhara Fernando (3); Malinga Bandara (3)

The Sri Lankan cricket team played a 4-match ODI series in India from 8 to 17 February 2007. India won the series 2–1.

== Squads ==
Sri Lanka	India
Mahela Jayawardene (c); Kumar Sangakkara; Sanath Jayasuriya; Upul Tharanga; Marvan Atapattu; Russel Arnold; Tillakaratne Dilshan; Chamara Silva; Malinga Bandara; Upul Chandana; Farveez Maharoof; Lasith Malinga; Nuwan Zoysa; Dilhara Fernando; Nuwan Kulasekara	Rahul Dravid (c); Sachin Tendulkar; Sourav Ganguly; Yuvraj Singh; MS Dhoni; Robin Uthappa; Ajit Agarkar; Zaheer Khan; Harbhajan Singh; Anil Kumble; Dinesh Karthik; Irfan Pathan; Munaf Patel; Virender Sehwag; S. Sreesanth

== Result ==
=== First ODI ===
8 February 2007
14:30 IST (D/N)
Scorecard

Sri Lanka; 102/3 (18.2 overs)	v	India
Sanath Jayasuriya 63* (61); Munaf Patel 2/25 (7 overs)

No result
Eden Gardens, Kolkata
Umpires: Suresh Shastri (Ind) and Simon Taufel (Aus)

- India won the toss and elected to field.
- Rain prevented any further play and match was abandoned.

=== Second ODI ===
11 February 2007
09:00 IST
Scorecard

Sri Lanka; 257/8 (50 overs)	v	India; 252/9 (50 overs)
Kumar Sangakkara 110 (127); Munaf Patel 4/49 (9 overs)		Sourav Ganguly 62 (79); Farveez Maharoof 3/42 (10 overs)

Sri Lanka won by 5 runs
Madhavrao Scindia Cricket Ground, Rajkot
Umpires: Suresh Shastri (Ind) and Simon Taufel (Aus)
Player of the match: Kumar Sangakkara (SL)

- India won the toss and elected to field.

=== Third ODI ===
14 February 2007
09:30 IST
Scorecard

Sri Lanka; 230/8 (50 overs)	v	India; 233/5 (46.3 overs)
Russel Arnold 66* (83); Zaheer Khan 5/42 (10 overs)		MS Dhoni 67* (74); Dilhara Fernando 2/43 (10 overs)

India won by 5 wickets
Nehru Stadium, Margao
Umpires: Amiesh Saheba (Ind) and Simon Taufel (Aus)
Player of the match: Zaheer Khan (Ind)

- Sri Lanka won the toss and elected to bat.
- Rahul Dravid completed 10,000 ODI runs in this match

=== Fourth ODI ===
17 February 2007
10:00 IST
Scorecard

Sri Lanka; 259/7 (47 overs)	v	India; 263/3 (41 overs)
Chamara Silva 107* (107); Ajit Agarkar 2/52 (10 overs)		Yuvraj Singh 95* (83); Dilhara Fernando 1/56 (9 overs)

India won by 7 wickets
Andhra Cricket Association-Visakhapatnam District Cricket Association Stadium, Visakhapatnam
Umpires: Amiesh Saheba (Ind) and Simon Taufel (Aus)
Player of the match: Chamara Silva (SL)

- India won the toss and elected to field.
