= 2006–07 Euroleague Regular Season Group B =

Standings and results for Group B of the Regular Season phase of the 2006-07 Euroleague basketball tournament.

Key to colors
Top five places in each group, plus highest-ranked sixth-place team, advance to Top 16
Eliminated

Tiebreakers:

- Head-to-head record in matches between the tied clubs
- Overall point difference in games between the tied clubs
- Overall point difference in all group matches (first tiebreaker if tied clubs are not in the same group)
- Points scored in all group matches
- Sum of quotients of points scored and points allowed in each group match

== Standings ==
	Team	Pld	W	L	PF	PA	Diff
1.	(Greece) Panathinaikos	14	11	3	1128	1036	92
2.	(Israel) Maccabi Tel Aviv	14	8	6	1230	1177	53
3.	(Spain) DKV Joventut	14	7	7	1112	1049	63
4.	(Spain) Unicaja	14	7	7	1001	1085	-84
5.	(Italy) Lottomatica Roma	14	6	8	1027	1044	-17
6.	(Serbia) Partizan	14	6	8	1100	1093	7
7.	(Croatia) Cibona	14	6	8	1113	1141	-28
8.	(Slovenia) Union Olimpija	14	5	9	1038	1124	-86

Notes:

- Joventut finish third, ahead of Unicaja, based on a head-to-head sweep.
- The three-way tie between Lottomatica, Partizan and Cibona for fifth through seventh places goes to the second tiebreaker of point difference in head-to-head matches because all three teams split their group matches against one another. Lottomatica win the tiebreaker and earn the automatic Top 16 berth with a head-to-head point difference of +11. Partizan's -3 is good for sixth place and a possible Top 16 berth (see below), and Cibona are eliminated from Top 16 contention at -8.
- Partizan finish level with Eldo Napoli in Group C for the best sixth-place record. Partizan win the tiebreaker with an overall points difference in group play of +7 to Eldo's -61.

=== Fixtures and results ===
* = Overtime (one star per overtime period)

Game 1, October 24–26, 2006

DKV Joventut (Spain)	79 – 82	(Greece) Panathinaikos	October 24, 2006
Lottomatica Roma (Italy)	65 – 60	(Serbia) Partizan	October 25, 2006
Maccabi Tel Aviv (Israel)	106 – 101	(Spain) Unicaja	October 26, 2006
Cibona (Croatia)	77 – 61	(Slovenia) Union Olimpija	October 26, 2006

Game 2, November 1–2, 2006

Union Olimpija (Slovenia)	83 – 72	(Italy) Lottomatica Roma	November 1, 2006
Panathinaikos (Greece)	86 – 69	(Croatia) Cibona	November 2, 2006
Unicaja (Spain)	66 – 68	(Spain) DKV Joventut	November 2, 2006
Partizan (Serbia)	103 – 91	(Israel) Maccabi Tel Aviv	November 2, 2006

Game 3, November 8–9, 2006

DKV Joventut (Spain)	82 – 51	(Serbia) Partizan	November 8, 2006
Union Olimpija (Slovenia)	65 – 86	(Greece) Panathinaikos	November 8, 2006
Maccabi Tel Aviv (Israel)	78 – 65	(Italy) Lottomatica Roma	November 9, 2006
Cibona (Croatia)	87* – 83	(Spain) Unicaja	November 9, 2006

Game 4, November 15–16, 2006

Panathinaikos (Greece)	87 – 71	(Italy) Lottomatica Roma	November 15, 2006
Partizan (Serbia)	101** – 92	(Croatia) Cibona	November 15, 2006
Maccabi Tel Aviv (Israel)	92 – 75	(Spain) DKV Joventut	November 16, 2006
Unicaja (Spain)	62 – 55	(Slovenia) Union Olimpija	November 16, 2006

Game 5, November 22–23, 2006

Lottomatica Roma (Italy)	71 – 69	(Spain) DKV Joventut	November 22, 2006
Union Olimpija (Slovenia)	70 – 71	(Serbia) Partizan	November 22, 2006
Cibona (Croatia)	87 – 82	(Israel) Maccabi Tel Aviv	November 23, 2006
Panathinaikos (Greece)	87 – 72	(Spain) Unicaja	November 23, 2006

Game 6, November 29–30, 2006

Partizan (Serbia)	65 – 73	(Greece) Panathinaikos	November 29, 2006
Lottomatica Roma (Italy)	65 – 71	(Spain) Unicaja	November 29, 2006
Maccabi Tel Aviv (Israel)	110 – 87	(Slovenia) Union Olimpija	November 30, 2006
DKV Joventut (Spain)	83 – 73	(Croatia) Cibona	November 30, 2006

Game 7, December 6–7, 2006

Unicaja (Spain)	66 – 58	(Serbia) Partizan	December 6, 2006
Cibona (Croatia)	91* – 84	(Italy) Lottomatica Roma	December 7, 2006
Panathinaikos (Greece)	90 – 88	(Israel) Maccabi Tel Aviv	December 7, 2006
Union Olimpija (Slovenia)	67 – 69	(Spain) DKV Joventut	December 7, 2006

Game 8, December 13–14, 2006

Panathinaikos (Greece)	83 – 73	(Spain) DKV Joventut	December 14, 2006
Union Olimpija (Slovenia)	92* – 88	(Croatia) Cibona	December 14, 2006
Partizan (Serbia)	73 – 63	(Italy) Lottomatica Roma	December 14, 2006
Unicaja (Spain)	67 – 83	(Israel) Maccabi Tel Aviv	December 14, 2006

Game 9, December 20–21, 2006

Lottomatica Roma (Italy)	84 – 74	(Slovenia) Union Olimpija	December 20, 2006
DKV Joventut (Spain)	105 – 52	(Spain) Unicaja	December 20, 2006
Cibona (Croatia)	75 – 78	(Greece) Panathinaikos	December 21, 2006
Maccabi Tel Aviv (Israel)	85 – 83	(Serbia) Partizan	December 21, 2006

Game 10, January 3–4, 2007

Partizan (Serbia)	74 – 83	(Spain) DKV Joventut	January 3, 2007
Panathinaikos (Greece)	83 – 74	(Slovenia) Union Olimpija	January 3, 2007
Lottomatica Roma (Italy)	88* – 81	(Israel) Maccabi Tel Aviv	January 4, 2007
Unicaja (Spain)	73 – 67	(Croatia) Cibona	January 4, 2007

Game 11, January 10–11, 2007

Union Olimpija (Slovenia)	87 – 59	(Spain) Unicaja	January 10, 2007
DKV Joventut (Spain)	98 – 92	(Israel) Maccabi Tel Aviv	January 11, 2007
Cibona (Croatia)	89 – 72	(Serbia) Partizan	January 11, 2007
Lottomatica Roma (Italy)	69 – 79	(Greece) Panathinaikos	January 11, 2007

Game 12, January 17–18, 2007

Partizan (Serbia)	106 – 60	(Slovenia) Union Olimpija	January 17, 2007
Unicaja (Spain)	67 – 61	(Greece) Panathinaikos	January 17, 2007
Maccabi Tel Aviv (Israel)	91 – 83	(Croatia) Cibona	January 18, 2007
DKV Joventut (Spain)	72 – 83	(Italy) Lottomatica Roma	January 18, 2007

Game 13, January 24–25, 2007

Cibona (Croatia)	77 – 74	(Spain) DKV Joventut	January 24, 2007
Panathinaikos (Greece)	80 – 93	(Serbia) Partizan	January 24, 2007
Unicaja (Spain)	68 – 66	(Italy) Lottomatica Roma	January 24, 2007
Union Olimpija (Slovenia)	77 – 75	(Israel) Maccabi Tel Aviv	January 25, 2007

Game 14, January 31 - February 1, 2007

Maccabi Tel Aviv (Israel)	76 – 73	(Greece) Panathinaikos	February 1, 2007
Lottomatica Roma (Italy)	81 – 58	(Croatia) Cibona	February 1, 2007
DKV Joventut (Spain)	82 – 86	(Slovenia) Union Olimpija	February 1, 2007
Partizan (Serbia)	90 – 94*	(Spain) Unicaja	February 1, 2007
