= Bangladeshi cricket team in Zimbabwe in 2006–07 =

Bangladeshi cricket team in Zimbabwe in 2007
- Date: 4 February 2007 – 10 February 2007
- Location: Zimbabwe
- Result: Bangladesh won the ODI series 3–1
- Player of the series: Mashrafe Mortaza
Teams
- Bangladesh: Zimbabwe
Captains
- Habibul Bashar: Prosper Utseya
Most runs
- Aftab Ahmed (148) Mushfiqur Rahim (127) Shakib Al Hasan (126): Vusi Sibanda (209); Elton Chigumbura (156); Chamu Chibhabha (111)
Most wickets
- Mashrafe Mortaza (8) Shakib Al Hasan (4) Abdur Razzak (4): Anthony Ireland (9); Christopher Mpofu (7); Gary Brent (6)

The Bangladesh national cricket team played a 4-match ODI series in Zimbabwe from 4 to 10 February 2007.

== Squads ==
Bangladesh
- Habibul Bashar (c)
- Shahriar Nafees
- Abdur Razzak
- Aftab Ahmed
- Mashrafe Mortaza
- Mehrab Hossain Jnr
- Mohammad Ashraful
- Mohammad Rafique
- Mohammad Sharif
- Mushfiqur Rahim (wk)
- Shakib Al Hasan
- Shahadat Hossain
- Tamim Iqbal
- Tapash Baisya
- Tushar Imran
Zimbabwe

- Prosper Utseya (c)
- Gary Brent
- Chamu Chibhabha
- Elton Chigumbura
- Terry Duffin
- Anthony Ireland
- Friday Kasteni
- Hamilton Masakadza
- Christopher Mpofu
- Tafadzwa Mufambisi (wk)
- Ed Rainsford
- Vusi Sibanda
- Sean Williams
- Keith Dabengwa
- Brendan Taylor
- Stuart Matsikenyeri

== ODI series ==
=== 1st ODI ===
4 February 2007
(scorecard)

| Bangladesh; 260/9 (50 overs) | v | Zimbabwe; 215 (47.5 overs) |
| QH Bashar 78 (87); AJ Ireland 3/41 (10) | | CJ Chibhabha 57 (116); MB Mortaza 5/41 (9) |

Bangladesh won by 45 runs
Harare Sports Club, Harare, Zimbabwe
Umpires: AM Saheba (IND) and RB Tiffin (ZIM).
Player of the match: S Hasan (BAN)

=== 2nd ODI ===
6 February 2007
(scorecard)

| Bangladesh; 153 (46 overs) | v | Zimbabwe; 156/2 (35.2 overs) |
| M Rafique 40 (49); GB Brent 4/30 (10) | | V Sibanda 93* (117); S Hasan 1/27 (6) |

Zimbabwe won by 8 wickets
Harare Sports Club, Harare, Zimbabwe
Umpires: AM Saheba (IND) and RB Tiffin (ZIM).
Player of the match: GB Brent (ZIM)

=== 3rd ODI ===
9 February 2007
(scorecard)

| Bangladesh; 228/9 (50 overs) | v | Zimbabwe; 214 (49.4 overs) |
| SA Nafees 69 (96); AJ Ireland 3/53 (10) | | V Sibanda 64 (89); TK Baisya 2/50 (10) |

Bangladesh won by 14 runs
Harare Sports Club, Harare, Zimbabwe
Umpires: AM Saheba (IND) and KC Barbour (ZIM).
Player of the match: SA Nafees (BAN)

=== 4th ODI ===
10 February 2007
(scorecard)

| Zimbabwe; 244/8 (50 overs) | v | Bangladesh; 246/9 (47.2 overs) |
| E Chigumbura 77* (57); MB Mortaza 3/52 (10) | | AC Ahmed 92 (78); CB Mpofu 3/52 (10) |

Bangladesh won by 1 wickets
Harare Sports Club, Harare, Zimbabwe
Umpires: AM Saheba (IND) and KC Barbour (ZIM).
Player of the match: AC Ahmed (BAN)

== Sources ==
- Playfair Cricket Annual
- Wisden Cricketers Almanack
