= November 2006 in sports =

<<	November 2006					>>
Su	Mo	Tu	We	Th	Fr	Sa
			1	2	3	4
5	6	7	8	9	10	11
12	13	14	15	16	17	18
19	20	21	22	23	24	25
26	27	28	29	30
Sports

This list shows notable sports-related deaths, events, and notable outcomes that occurred in November of 2006.

== Deaths ==
- 24 Willie Pep
- 23 Pat Dobson
- 20 Andre Waters
- 17 Ferenc Puskás
- 17 Bo Schembechler
- 7 Jackie Parker
- 7 Bryan Pata
- 7 Johnny Sain
- 6 Francisco Fernández Ochoa
- 5 Pietro Rava
- 4 Sergi López Segú
- 3 Alberto Spencer
- 2 Wally Foreman

== Sporting seasons ==
- Auto racing 2006:
  - D1 Grand Prix
  - World Rally Championship
  - A1 Grand Prix
- Basketball 2006–07:
  - Euroleague
  - Philippine Basketball Association
  - Australian National Basketball League
- Cricket 2006–07:
  - Australia
  - South Africa
- Cyclo-cross: 2006/07 Cyclo-cross World Cup
- Football 2006–07:
  - 2006–07 UEFA Champions League
  - 2006–07 UEFA Cup
  - England (general)
  - 2006–07 FA Premier League
  - Scotland
- Golf:
  - 2007 European Tour

- Rugby union 2006:
  - 2006–07 Heineken Cup
  - 2006–07 English Premiership
  - 2006–07 Top 14
  - 2006–07 Celtic League
  - 2007 Rugby World Cup qualifying
- Speed skating 2006–07:
  - Essent Cup 2006–07
  - World Cup
- Volleyball 2006:
  - Men's CEV Champions League 2006–07
- U.S. and Canadian sports 2006–07:
  - 2006 US college football season
  - 2006 NFL season
  - 2006–07 NHL season
  - 2006–07 NBA season

== 30 November 2006 (Thursday) ==
- Asian Games
  - Baseball – Chinese Taipei (Taiwan) 4–2 South Korea. The Taiwanese use three home runs to strike first in the gold medal chase.
  - Table Tennis
    - Men (Team): Chinese Taipei (Taiwan) and Singapore advance to the quarterfinals.
      - Quarterfinal Matches:
        - China 3–0 Qatar
        - Chinese Taipei (Taiwan) 3–0 Vietnam
        - Hong Kong 3–2 Japan
        - Singapore 0–3 South Korea
    - Women (Team): (North Korea) DPR Korea and India advance to the quarterfinals
      - Quarterfinal Matches:
        - (North Korea) DPR Korea 3–0 Thailand
        - Hong Kong 1–3 Singapore
        - South Korea 3–0 India
        - Japan 0–3 China
- Cricket: Pakistan batsman Mohammad Yousuf breaks Viv Richards' record for runs in test cricket in a calendar year in a match against the West Indies.
- American football:
  - College: MAC Championship at Detroit:
    - Central Michigan 31, Ohio 10: The Chippewas win their first outright MAC title.
  - NFL Week 13 Thursday Night Game: Cincinnati Bengals 13, Baltimore Ravens 7. T. J. Houshmandzadeh's 40-yard catch of a flea-flicker pass from Carson Palmer prevented the Ravens from clinching the AFC North.
- Football (soccer): 2006–07 UEFA Cup Matchday 4. Clubs that have qualified today for the Round of 32 are in **bold.**
  - Group E: Nancy 3–0 Feyenoord^{1}
  - Group E: Wisła Kraków 3–1 FC Basel
  - Group F: Ajax 0–2 Espanyol
  - Group F: Austria Vienna 0–1 Sparta Prague
  - Group G: Mladá Boleslav 0–0 Paris Saint-Germain
  - Group G: **Panathinaikos** 0–0 Rapid Bucharest
  - Group H: Celta Vigo 1–0 Fenerbahçe
  - Group H: Eintracht Frankfurt 0–0 Newcastle United

^Note 1 : The match was suspended after 80 minutes of play at 3–0 due to crowd trouble. Feyenoord fans who gathered tickets for the match in an illegal way and others who were held at the stadium by the police were rioting during the whole match. After a 20-minute break, the match was finished.

== 29 November 2006 (Wednesday) ==
- Asian Games
  - Table Tennis
    - Team-Men – China, Japan, (South Korea) Korea, Qatar, Hong Kong, and Vietnam all advance to the quarterfinals.
    - Team-Women – Hong Kong, China, (South Korea) Korea, Japan, Thailand, and Singapore all advance to the quarterfinals.
- College Basketball (American): For the second time in less than a week, the top team in the AP NCAA Division I Men's poll came up on the losing side of the score, as this week's #1 team, Ohio State was beaten by #6 North Carolina 98–89 in the "Dean Dome".
- Football: 2006–07 UEFA Cup Matchday 4. Clubs that clinched advancement to the round of 32 today are in **bold**.
  - Group A: Partizan Belgrade 1–4 AJ Auxerre
  - Group A: Livorno 1–1 **Maccabi Haifa**
  - Group B: **Dinamo Bucharest** 2–1 Bayer Leverkusen
  - Group B: Beşiktaş 2–1 Club Brugge
  - Group C: Grasshoppers 0–4 **Sevilla**
  - Group C: **AZ Alkmaar** 2–2 Slovan Liberec
  - Group D: Lens 1–2 Parma
  - Group D: Osasuna 3–1 Odense
- General news:
  - FIFA announces its three-player shortlists for the 2006 World Player of the Year awards:
    - Men: Fabio Cannavaro (Italy), Ronaldinho (Brazil), Zinedine Zidane (France)
    - Women: Kristine Lilly (United States), Renate Lingor (Germany), Marta (Brazil)
  - José Manuel Esnal who promoted with Levante UD towards La Liga in the 2005–06 season will replace Félix Sarriugarte as the manager of Athletic Bilbao.
  - Gimnàstic de Tarragona appoints Paco Flores as their new manager. Flores who was also manager of RCD Espanyol and Real Zaragoza replaces Luis Ángel César Sampedro, who was fired earlier this week.
- Rugby union:
  - Andy Robinson resigns as manager of the England national rugby union team after his team lost eight out of the last nine matches he managed the team.

== 28 November 2006 (Tuesday) ==
- Asian Games
  - Volleyball – Chinese Taipei (Taiwan), Kuwait, Bahrain, and Lebanon advance to the second round.
- Cricket – Pakistani cricketer Mohammad Yousuf becomes the first to score 8 test centuries in a calendar year during the third test of the West Indies tour of Pakistan.
- Equestrian:
  - The parents of Albert Zoer who own his horse Okidoki reject a €4,000,000 bid on the 10-year-old horse. Zoer already won several Grand-Prix events with Okidoki and they were part of the Dutch team that became World Champions in Aachen in 2006. Owner Mr. Zoer told the press he prefers his son's career over the money.
- Swimming:
  - Breaststroke specialist Madelon Baans ends her career at the age of 29 to concentrate on her post-sport career. Baans is 49 time Dutch national champion, current Dutch national record holder at the 100m breaststroke in either the 25- and 50m pools. During the 2004 European Championships in Madrid, she won the bronze medal as being part of the 4 × 100 m medley, in the same year she reached the final at the 2004 Summer Olympics on the same discipline.
- 2010 Winter Olympics:
  - Skicross will likely be added to the Olympic schedule as of the Vancouver Olympics in 2010 after the executive board voted in favour of the sport. The inclusion of skicross must also be approved by the Vancouver Olympic Committee for the sport to be officially part of the sport program. Other events that were up for inclusion were rejected. These events included: Biathlon mixed relay, mixed curling, team alpine skiing, team bobsleigh, team skeleton, team luge and women's ski jumping.

== 27 November 2006 (Monday) ==
- Asian Games:
  - Volleyball – United Arab Emirates and Hong Kong advance to the second round.
- NBA Basketball:
  - The top teams in the Eastern and Western Conferences met in Salt Lake City, Utah, as the Orlando Magic defeated the Utah Jazz, 88–75. Dwight Howard and Carlos Boozer led their respective teams with 21 points each, but Howard had 16 rebounds as well. The Magic out-rebounded the Jazz, 45–36.
- Cricket: England in Australia:
  - Australia wins the opening Ashes Test in Brisbane, defeating England by 277 runs at the Gabba. Australian captain Ricky Ponting is named Player of the Match for his score of 196 in the First Innings. (Scorecard)
- Football (American):
  - NFL Monday Night Football:
    - Seattle Seahawks 34, Green Bay Packers 24. Shaun Alexander rushed 40 times for 201 yards, becoming the third player in NFL history to do so, and Matt Hasselbeck threw for three second half touchdowns in the first Seahawks game played in a Seattle snowstorm.
  - College:
    - Alabama fired head coach Mike Shula. Joe Kines, former Arkansas coach, will serve as the team's coach in their bowl game.
    - Michigan State names Cincinnati head coach Mark Dantonio as their new coach. The Bearcats then announce defensive coordinator Pat Narduzzi will coach the team in their bowl game.
    - Iowa State reaches into the Big 12 and names Texas assistant Gene Chizik as their new coach.
- Football (soccer):
  - The Golden Ball, the prize awarded to the European Footballer of the Year, goes to Fabio Cannavaro of Real Madrid. Cannavaro was the captain of Italy during the 2006 FIFA World Cup where his team became World Champion. Cannavaro gained 173 points, with Gianluigi Buffon (124) and Thierry Henry (121) following in second and third place. He is the first defender to win the award since Matthias Sammer in 1996.
  - Branko Oblak resigns as the manager of Slovenia. Oblak led the Slovenians since 2004.
  - In Spain two La Liga managers were sacked due to achieving weak results in the competition. Félix Sarriugarte only won 8 points in 12 games at Athletic Bilbao, while Luis Ángel César Sampedro was in the bottom position with his team Gimnàstic de Tarragona.
  - RKC Waalwijk sacks their manager Adrie Koster. RKC is currently in 18th and last position of the Eredivisie.
- Ice hockey: The NHL's Chicago Blackhawks fire head coach Trent Yawney and name former star Denis Savard as his replacement.
- Tennis:
  - Thiemo de Bakker and Antal van der Duim are suspended for a month by the Dutch Tennis Federation, because the two did not follow the commitments made between them and the federation. They were supposed to fly back home, but played three tournaments in Israel instead. De Bakker reached the final in one of these tournaments.

== 26 November 2006 (Sunday) ==
- Asian Games
  - Basketball: Uzbekistan, Syria, and Kazakhstan all advance to the second round of the tournament by winning their respective groups.
  - Volleyball: Saudi Arabia and Macau advance to the second round of the tournament.
- Auto racing: 2006–07 A1 Grand Prix of Nations, Malaysia:
  - Neel Jani finishes in first position of the sprint race, beating Nico Hülkenberg and Jonny Reid. Hülkenberg however, wins the main race later in the day by finishing in front of Robbie Kerr and Nicolas Lapierre.
- Cycling: During the Six Days of Ghent current world champion at the madison Isaac Gálvez was involved in a serious crash in which he received serious injuries. He was rushed to a nearby hospital. While being rushed there, he died as a result of his injuries. The race was immediately stopped and no winners were announced.
- Football (American)
  - College football: Two head coaches were given their walking papers as North Carolina State's Chuck Amato and Arizona State's Dirk Koetter were fired. (Charlotte Observer via San Jose Mercury News)
  - NFL Week 12 Sunday games:
    - Minnesota Vikings 31, Arizona Cardinals 26. Chester Taylor's 136 yards rushing was part of the Vikings' win.
    - Washington Redskins 17, Carolina Panthers 13. Redskins quarterback Jason Campbell gets his first NFL win on a 66-yard touchdown pass to Chris Cooley late in the fourth quarter.
    - Cincinnati Bengals 30, Cleveland Browns 0. The Bengals pitch a shutout for the first time since December 3, 1989, against the Browns.
    - New York Jets 26, Houston Texans 11. Chad Pennington threw for 289 yards in the Jet's win.
    - Buffalo Bills 27, Jacksonville Jaguars 24. Rian Lindell's 42-yard field goal as time expired gave the Bills their second straight come-from-behind win.
    - New Orleans Saints 31, Atlanta Falcons 13. Michael Vick runs for 166 yards but completes only nine passes, then flips off booing fans while leaving the field. He later apologizes for the gesture. Meanwhile, Ryan Copper's 48-yard catch of a "Hail Mary pass" from Drew Brees to end the first half stunned the Falcons.
    - Baltimore Ravens 27, Pittsburgh Steelers 0. The Ravens sack Ben Roethlisberger nine times and intercept him twice.
    - St. Louis Rams 20, San Francisco 49ers 17. Marc Bulger saved the day for the Rams with a game-winning five-yard TD pass ti Kevin Curtis with 27 seconds left.
    - San Diego Chargers 21, Oakland Raiders 14. For the fourth week in a row, LaDainian Tomlinson leads the Chargers on a second-half comeback. This time, Tomlinson runs for two touchdowns and throws a third.
    - New England Patriots 17, Chicago Bears 13: In a game with nine turnovers, Asante Samuel's third interception ends Chicago's comeback attempt.
    - Tennessee Titans 24, New York Giants 21. The Giants lead 21–0 with 10 minutes left. But Vince Young throws two touchdown passes and runs in a third score to tie the game. A Pacman Jones interception in the last minute sets up Rob Bironas' game-winning 49-yard field goal.
    - Indianapolis Colts 45, Philadelphia Eagles 21. Joseph Addai ties a Colts record with four rushing touchdowns.
  - In off-the-field news:
    - The Denver Broncos, searching for a kick start to a struggling offense, have replaced Jake Plummer at quarterback with rookie Jay Cutler for next Sunday night's game against Seattle.
- Football (soccer):
  - Slavoljub Muslin is re-appointed at the manager of SC Lokeren where he decided to leave the club in December 2005 to manage FC Lokomotiv Moscow where he was fired in October 2006. Muslin replaces Ariel Jacobs.
- Golf: MasterCard Masters:
  - Justin Rose wins his third career win at the 2007 European Tour finishing 12 under par and two strokes in front of Australians Greg Chalmers and Richard Green.
- Handball: 2006 Møbelringen Cup:
  - Norway defeats Russia 29–26 in the final match of the tournament and wins the tournament with the maximum score of six points.
- Rugby union: 2006 Autumn internationals
  - Ireland 61–17 Pacific Islanders. Ireland give their historic home of Lansdowne Road a fitting sendoff in the last international rugby match before a two-year redevelopment project to create a modern 50,000-seat stadium.
- Squash, 2006 Women's World Open Squash Championship, final:
  - Nicol David (Malaysia) 1–9, 9–7, 3–9, 9–5, 9–2 (Australia) Natalie Grinham – David successfully defends her title.
- Swimming: Mark Warnecke, current world champion on the 50m breaststroke announces his retirement in sports at the age of 36. Warnecke, who won a bronze medal at the 1996 Summer Olympics was unable to qualify for the upcoming World Championships before taking his decision.

== 25 November 2006 (Saturday) ==
- Basketball: Men's College basketball: Kansas, ranked No. 12 in the AP poll, upset the defending national champion (and #1 team) Florida, 82–80 in overtime at Las Vegas.
- Football (Canadian): Canadian Interuniversity Sport national championship (Vanier Cup):
  - (2) Laval Rouge et Or 13, (4) Saskatchewan Huskies 8. Laval wins their third Vanier Cup in four years, even though the Huskies were the first team to play the Vanier Cup at home under the new conference-rotation arrangement.
- Football (U.S. College): AP NCAA Division I-A Top 25:
  - (3) Southern California 44, (6) Notre Dame 24. The Trojans win moves them one step closer to meeting Ohio State in the BCS National Championship Game. A win against their crosstown rival UCLA next week will all but assure them of a visit to Glendale, Arizona January 8.
  - (4) Florida 21, Florida State 14. The Gators escape with a win in their state rivalry.
  - South Florida 24, (7) West Virginia 19. The Bulls stun the Mountaineers at home with this major upset, knocking West Virginia out of national championship contention.
  - (8) Louisville 48, Pittsburgh 24
  - (12) Boise State 38, Nevada 7. The Broncos complete a perfect regular season, all but assuring them of becoming the second team outside of the BCS conferences to play in a BCS bowl game.
  - (13) Oklahoma 27, Oklahoma State 21. With this win in the Bedlam Series, the Sooner Schooner now travels to Kansas City next Saturday against old rival Nebraska in the Big 12 Championship.
  - (15) Rutgers 38, Syracuse 7
  - Georgia 15, (16) Georgia Tech 12. This is Georgia's sixth straight win for the Governor's Cup.
  - (17) Virginia Tech 17, Virginia 0
  - (19) Tennessee 17, Kentucky 12. For the 22nd straight time, the Wildcats fall to the Vols, the second longest losing streak by one school against another. Notre Dame's 42-game streak against Navy is still the longest.
  - (20) Wake Forest 38, Maryland 24. The Demon Deacons now head to Jacksonville and meet Georgia Tech for the ACC title.
  - (21) BYU 33, Utah 31. The Cougars needed a Jonny Harline 11-yard touchdown catch from John Beck as time expire to beat their in-state rival for the first time in four years.
  - South Carolina 31, (24) Clemson 28
  - (25) Hawaiʻi 42, Purdue 35
- Football (soccer):
  - General news:
    - Manchester United extends Wayne Rooney's contract with another two seasons. Rooney is now committed to Old Trafford until 2012.
  - ELF Cup, final:
    - Northern Cyprus 3–1 Crimea
- Rugby league: 2006 Rugby League Tri-Nations:
  - Australia wins the series after defeating New Zealand 16–12 in golden point extra time in the final at Sydney Football Stadium in Sydney.
- Rugby union: 2007 Rugby World Cup qualifying:
  - Japan qualify directly to the World Cup in France next year, qualifying as Asia 1, after defeating Hong Kong and Korea in the final stages of the Asia tournaments. Japan join Pool B, along with Australia, Canada, Fiji and Wales.
  - Georgia qualify as Europe 3, joining Pool D along with Argentina, hosts France, Ireland and Namibia.
- Rugby union: 2006 Autumn internationals:
  - South Africa defeat England 25–14 at Twickenham, London
  - Australia defeat Scotland 44–15 at Murrayfield in Edinburgh
  - New Zealand defeat Wales 45–10 at Millennium Stadium in Cardiff
  - France defeat Argentina 27–26 at Stade de France in Saint-Denis (Paris)
  - Italy defeat Canada 41–6 at Stadio Pordenone in Fontanafredda
- Squash, 2006 Women's World Open Squash Championship, semi finals:
  - Nicol David (Malaysia) 9–7, 9–1, 9–1 (Australia) Rachael Grinham
  - Natalie Grinham (Australia) 9–4, 10–8, 9–6 (United States) Natalie Grainger

== 24 November 2006 (Friday) ==
- Asian Games:
  - Basketball – Bahrain advances to the second round after winning Group A.
  - Football (soccer) – Jordan, Kyrgyzstan, Iraq and Syria advance to the second round after finishing in the top two positions of their first round groups.
- Auto racing:
  - Lewis Hamilton is announced to be the second driver for McLaren's Formula One team to race alongside world champion Fernando Alonso. He will be the first black driver in the Formula One history.
- Cricket:
  - The Ashes series between England and Australia continues at the Gabba, Brisbane. Ricky Ponting scores 196 runs, four short of a double century, and Australia declares at 9 for 602. In reply, England scores 3 for 53 by the close of play for the day.
- Cycling:
  - Tinkoff Credit Systems signs two former doping suspended cyclists to their team for the 2007 season. Olympic gold medallist Tyler Hamilton joins the team after three years of suspension, while Danilo Hondo returned in 2006 after being suspended for a year.
- College football: AP NCAA Division I-A Top 25:
  - Texas A&M 12, (13) Texas 7. Combined with the Longhorns' loss, Oklahoma clinched a spot against Nebraska in Kansas City in the Big 12 Championship game next week with a win on Saturday (November 25) against Oklahoma State.
  - (10) LSU 31, (6) Arkansas 26. The Tigers knock the Razorbacks out of the national championship picture.
  - (22) Nebraska 37, Colorado 14.
  - In another significant rivalry game:
    - Oregon State 30, Oregon 28. The Beavers win the 2006 edition of "The Civil War".
- Football (soccer):
  - Sergei Sokolov, member of the Azerbaijan national football team is suspended by UEFA after he was tested positive on using betamethason. The length of his suspension will be announced on 7 December 2006. Sokolov, defender at FK Karabakh claims to be innocent. However, he did not cooperate for a B-test.
- Squash, 2006 Women's World Open Squash Championship, quarter finals:
  - Nicol David (Malaysia) 10–8, 9–2, 9–4 (Egypt) Omneya Abdel Kawy
  - Rachael Grinham (Australia) 9–2, 9–3, 9–6 (England) Laura Lengthorn
  - Natalie Grinham (Australia) 9–5, 10–8, 9–5 (England) Tania Bailey
  - Natalie Grainger (United States) 9–2, 9–4, 9–5 (Republic of Ireland) Madeline Perry

== 23 November 2006 (Thursday) ==
- Football:
  - 2006–07 UEFA Cup Matchday 3. Teams that clinched advancement to the round of 32 today are in **bold**.
    - Group A: AJ Auxerre 2–2 **Rangers**
    - Group A: Maccabi Haifa 1–0 Partizan Belgrade
    - Group B: Bayer Leverkusen 0–1 **Tottenham Hotspur**
    - Group B: Club Brugge 1–1 Dinamo Bucharest
    - Group C: Sevilla 2–0 Braga
    - Group C: Slovan Liberec 4–1 Grasshoppers
    - Group D: **Parma** 2–1 Heerenveen
    - Group D: Odense 1–1 Lens
    - Group E: Feyenoord 0–0 **Blackburn Rovers**
    - Group E: FC Basel 2–2 Nancy
    - Group F: Sparta Prague 0–0 Ajax
    - Group F: Espanyol 6–2 Zulte-Waregem
    - Group G: Paris Saint-Germain 2–4 Hapoel Tel Aviv
    - Group G: Rapid Bucharest 1–1 Mladá Boleslav
    - Group H: Fenerbahçe 3–0 Eintracht Frankfurt
    - Group H: **Newcastle United** 2–1 Celta Vigo
  - ELF Cup Semi-finals
    - Kyrgyzstan 2–3 Crimea – Crimea goes on to the finals.
    - Northern Cyprus 5–0 Zanzibar – TRNC goes on to the finals.
  - General news:
    - The FIFA Emergency Committee decides to suspend the IRIFF from all international competitions. This happens due to government interference in football matters. FIFA gave the IRIFF a deadline of 15 November 2006 to reinstate president Mohammed Dagdan who was elected, the IRIFF, however, did not follow this deadline.
- Cricket
  - West Indies v. Pakistan, Second Test at Multan: The Second Test between West Indies and Pakistan ends in a draw. Pakistan leads the three-Test series 1–0. (Scorecard)
  - The Ashes series between England and Australia gets underway at the Gabba, Brisbane. Australia win the toss and elect to bat, ending the first day of the First Test in a strong position on 346 runs for the loss of 3 wickets.
- American football:
  - NFL Week 12 Thanksgiving games:
    - Miami Dolphins 27, Detroit Lions 10. Joey Harrington's return to Ford Field was a measure of revenge on the team that released him, throwing for three touchdowns in the Dolphins' victory.
    - Dallas Cowboys 38, Tampa Bay Buccaneers 10. Tony Romo tossed a club record five touchdowns as the Boys routed the Bucs.
    - Kansas City Chiefs 19, Denver Broncos 10. Lawrence Tynes' four field goals provided the margin of victory.
  - College Football:
    - AP NCAA Division I-A Top 25: Miami (FL) 17, (18) Boston College 14. Even with Doug Flutie in attendance calling the game on ESPN, the Eagles could not pull off another "Miracle in Miami" as the Canes become bowl eligible. However, it was not enough to save head coach Larry Coker's job as he was fired the next day.

== 22 November 2006 (Wednesday) ==
- Athletics:
  - Noah Ngeny, gold medallist at the 2000 Summer Olympics' 1500 m after favourite Hicham El Guerrouj ends his international career at the age of 28. Ngeny still holds the world record of 2.11,96 at the 1000 m.
- Football:
  - 2006–07 UEFA Champions League Matchday 5 (Teams advancing in **Bold**):
    - Group A: Werder Bremen 1–0 Chelsea
    - Group A: Levski Sofia 0–2 Barcelona
      - Barca must win in their final match against Werner Bremen to make the top two and assure passage into the knockout stage.
    - Group B: **Inter Milan** 1–0 Sporting
    - Group B: Spartak Moscow 2–2 **Bayern München**
      - Bayern and Inter both advance to the knockout stage.
    - Group C: Bordeaux 3–1 Galatasaray
    - Group C: **Liverpool** 2–0 **PSV Eindhoven**
      - Liverpool wins the group, and advances with Eindhoven.
    - Group D: Shakhtar Donetsk 1–0 Roma
    - Group D: **Valencia** 2–0 Olympiakos
      - Roma advances with a win or a draw against Valencia, while Shakhtar loses to Olympiakos.
  - Lierse SK appoints former player Kjetil Rekdal as their new manager to replace René Trost. Kjetil Rekdal resigned at Vålerenga IF on 21 August 2006.
  - Henk Houwaart is the replacement of Thomas Caers at Sint-Truiden. Dutchman Houwaart managed six other Belgian teams during his career. The last team he managed was AC Omonia.
- Ice hockey:
  - The NHL Columbus Blue Jackets name Ken Hitchcock, who was fired as head coach of the Philadelphia Flyers earlier this season, as their new head coach, signing him to a three-year deal. His first game will be this Friday (11/24) against his former employers in Philadelphia. (Canada.com)
  - Teemu Selanne scored his 500th career NHL goal, however, the Anaheim Ducks lost to the Colorado Avalanche in a shootout, 3–2.

== 21 November 2006 (Tuesday) ==
- Football:
  - ELF Cup Group Stage
    - Group A: Greenland 0–1 Kyrgyzstan – Kyrgyzstan tops Group A and qualifies to the semi-finals.
    - Group A: Găgăuzia 1–1 Zanzibar – Zanzibar gets 2nd place in Group A and qualifies to the semi-finals.
    - Group B: Tajikistan 1–2 Crimea – Crimea gets 2nd place in Group B and qualifies to the semi-finals.
    - Group B: Northern Cyprus 10–0 Tibet – Turkish Republic of Northern Cyprus beat their former 'best win' record of 5–0 against Crimea with this score and qualifies to the semi-finals as top of Group B.
  - 2006–07 UEFA Champions League Matchday 5 (Teams advancing in **bold**):
    - Group E: Steaua Bucharest 1–1 Dynamo Kyiv
    - Group E: **Real Madrid** 2–2 **Lyon**
      - Lyon and Real Madrid qualify for the last 16 from Group E.
    - Group F: Benfica 3–1 København
    - Group F: **Celtic** 1–0 Manchester United
      - Celtic qualify for the last 16 for the first time through an 81st-minute goal by Shunsuke Nakamura and an 89th-minute penalty save by Artur Boruc. United need a point from their last game against Benfica.
    - Group G: Arsenal 3–1 Hamburg
    - Group G: CSKA Moscow 0–2 Porto
      - Arsenal and Porto, who meet in the last match, lead the group on 10 points each, two ahead of CSKA.
    - Group H: AEK Athens 1–0 **A.C. Milan**
    - Group H: Lille 2–2 Anderlecht
      - Milan qualify for the last 16; AEK and Lille still depend on the results of their last matches.
  - The board of London's West Ham United F.C. accept an offer of £85 million from an Icelandic consortium led by Iceland FA chairman Eggert Magnusson to buy the club. The consortium has also taken on the clubs' £22.5 million debt. (BBC)
- Major League Baseball: Justin Morneau of the Minnesota Twins is named the winner of the 2006 American League Most Valuable Player.
- Swimming: Australian Ian Thorpe, a five-time Olympic gold medalist, announces his retirement from the sport at the age of 24. (BBC)

== 20 November 2006 (Monday) ==
- Alpine skiing: Jose Maria Rienda Contreras suffers a heavy knee injury after falling during a training in preparation for the giant slalom World Cup in Aspen. Contreras, who won five World Cup meetings in her career will probably miss the whole alpine skiing season.
- Major League Baseball: Philadelphia Phillies first baseman Ryan Howard followed winning the Rookie of the Year award in 2005 with the 2006 Most Valuable Player award in the National League, becoming the fourth sophomore to do so.
- Cycling: Former Danish cyclist Jesper Skibby confirms to have used doping during his career for years. Skibby writes this confession in his book that is released on 21 November.
- NFL Monday Night Football: Jacksonville Jaguars 26, New York Giants 10. The Giants were held to a total of 26 yards rushing and are now tied with the Cowboys for first place in the NFC East.
- Football (soccer):
  - ELF Cup Group Stage
    - Group A: Găgăuzia 2–6 Kyrgyzstan
    - Group A: Greenland 1–1 Zanzibar
    - Group B: Tibet 0–1 Crimea
    - Group B: Tajikistan 1–5 Northern Cyprus – Turkish Republic of Northern Cyprus guarantees qualification into semi-finals.
  - 2007 ASEAN Football Championship Qualifying Round:
    - Laos and Philippines advance to the finals of the tournament which will be held in 2007.
    - With the top teams advancing to the finals, Laos overcame Brunei 4–1 to clinch first place at the sole group
    - The Philippines, which only needed a draw to qualify, beat the same Brunei team, 4–1, to clinch second place.
    - They will be joined by Indonesia, Malaysia, Myanmar, Singapore, Thailand and Vietnam.
  - General news:
    - São Paulo FC wins the Campeonato Brasileiro Série A for the fourth time in the history of the club, with still two more games to play. São Paulo's 1–1 draw versus Atlético Paranaense was enough to claim the title as the only opponent that was left Internacional lost 1–0 versus Paraná.
    - Frans Adelaar resigns as manager of ADO Den Haag one day after the match versus Vitesse Arnhem was abandoned at 0–3 when unhappy fans entered the pitch. Some fans were threatening Adelaar, who took his conclusions. Assistant manager Lex Schoenmaker will take care of the first team. Shirt sponsor "DSW" decided to remove the name of their company from the shirts immediately.

== 19 November 2006 (Sunday) ==
- Air Race World Series: Kirby Chambliss is crowned World Champion in Perth, Western Australia.
- Auto racing:
  - Chase for the 2006 NEXTEL Cup: Ford 400 in Homestead, Florida
    - (1) Greg Biffle (2) Martin Truex Jr. (3) Denny Hamlin; (6) Matt Kenseth; (9) Jimmie Johnson. Greg Biffle wins his third in a row in Miami, but Jimmie Johnson finishes ninth to clinch the 2006 NEXTEL Cup championship despite Matt Kenseth's sixth-place finish.
- Baseball:
  - Major League Baseball: The Chicago Cubs reportedly sign Alfonso Soriano to an eight-year, $134 million (US) contract according to AP.
  - In the Intercontinental Cup championship, Cuba defeated Netherlands 6–3, while Chinese Taipei (Taiwan), the host country, won the third place game, shutting out Japan 4–0.
- NFL Week 11 Games:
  - Baltimore Ravens 24, Atlanta Falcons 10. Jamal Lewis scored three touchdowns in the Ravens' win.
  - Buffalo Bills 24, Houston Texans 21. Peerless Price's 15-yard touchdown catch from J. P. Losman with nine seconds left gave the Bills the come-from-behind victory. Losman threw two first quarter 83-yard touchdown passes to Lee Evans as part of Evans' club record 265 receiving yards on the day, while David Carr tied the NFL mark of 22 straight passes completed in the loss.
  - Chicago Bears 10 New York Jets 0. The Monsters of the Midway return to The Meadowlands a week after beating the Giants and shut out the Jets.
  - Cincinnati Bengals 31, New Orleans Saints 16. In spite of Drew Brees throwing for 510 yards, Carson Palmer and Chad Johnson (a/k/a "Ocho Cinco") connect for three touchdowns in the Bengals' win.
  - Miami Dolphins 24, Minnesota Vikings 20. Jason Taylor provided one of two Dolphin returns for touchdowns in this win.
  - New England Patriots 35, Green Bay Packers 0. Brett Favre injured his right elbow in this game, and his status (272 straight starts) is in jeopardy for next week's game. Favre's backup, Aaron Rogers, was lost for the season with a foot injury. Fellow Super Bowl winning quarterback Tom Brady, tossed four touchdowns in the rout.
  - Kansas City Chiefs 17, Oakland Raiders 13. Trent Green fared better in his return as the Chiefs' starting quarterback than his Raiders' counterpart, Aaron Brooks, as Larry Johnson's one-yard touchdown was the difference.
  - Pittsburgh Steelers 24, Cleveland Browns 20. Ben Roethlisberger's four-yard shovel pass to Willie Parker with 32 seconds left was the difference.
  - Carolina Panthers 15, St. Louis Rams 0. The Rams were shut out for the first time since the 1998 season by the Panthers.
  - Tennessee Titans 31, Philadelphia Eagles 13. Donovan McNabb is lost for the season with a torn ACL in his right knee. The Titans' upset was led by Travis Henry's 125 yards rushing and Adam "Pacman" Jones' 90-yard punt return for a game-breaking touchdown.
  - Tampa Bay Buccaneers 20, Washington Redskins 17. Even with a new starting quarterback in Jason Campbell, the Redskins sputtered to another loss, this time in Tampa.
  - Arizona Cardinals 17, Detroit Lions 10. The Cards win their second game of the year, their first with Matt Leinart as their starting quarterback.
  - San Francisco 49ers 20, Seattle Seahawks 17. On the day Jerry Rice was honored with the retirement of his number 80 jersey, Frank Gore resets the franchise's all-time single game rushing mark (212 yards) for the second straight week, upstaging a returning Shaun Alexander.
  - Dallas Cowboys 21, Indianapolis Colts 14. Thanks to four turnovers in the first six Colts second half possessions, the Cowboys end their unbeaten run, meaning the 1972 Miami Dolphins can uncork the champagne as they remain the only team in NFL history to finish a season (including the post-season) undefeated.
  - San Diego Chargers 35, Denver Broncos 27. For the second straight week, LaDainian Tomlinson scores four touchdowns, including his 100th career touchdown in his 89th game, and the Chargers take control of the AFC West with this "Flex Game" win.
- Canadian Football League:
  - 94th Grey Cup Final at Winnipeg, Manitoba: B.C. Lions 25, Montreal Alouettes 14. The Lions win their fifth CFL championship, thanks in part to Paul McCallum's Grey Cup record six field goals. Robert Edwards' fumble on the Lions' goal line kills Montreal's comeback attempt.
- Football (soccer)
  - ELF Cup Group Stage
    - Group A: Găgăuzia 0–2 Greenland
    - Group A: Kyrgyzstan 0–1 Zanzibar
    - Group B: Tibet 0–3 Tajikistan
    - Group B: Crimea 0–5 Northern Cyprus – Turkish Republic of Northern Cyprus beat their former 'best win' record of 6–2 against Sápmi with this score.
- Golf: 2007 European Tour: USB Hong Kong Open:
    - José Manuel Lara wins his first European Tour event by finishing 15 under par and just 1 stroke in front of Juvic Pagunsan. The third spot is shared by Jeev Milkha Singh, Thongchai Jaidee and Jyoti Randhawa.
- Ice hockey: The New York Rangers' Jaromir Jagr scores his 600th NHL goal 1:43 into the game as the Rangers beat the Tampa Bay Lightning, 4–1. Jagr joins teammate Brendan Shanahan as a member of the 600 goal club this season.
- Handball (beach): 2006 Beach Handball World Championships:
  - men's medal matches:
    - Gold medal match: Brazil 2–0 Turkey
    - Bronze medal match: Egypt 1–2 Spain
  - women's medal matches:
    - Gold medal match: Germany 0–2 Brazil
    - Russia 2–0 Bulgaria
- Handball (team): 2006 Handball World Cup medal matches:
  - Gold medal match: Romania 28–29 Russia
  - Bronze medal match: Ukraine 20–24 Denmark
- Jujutsu: 2006 Jujutsu World Championships:
  - men's −69 kg: (gold) (France) Julien Boussuge, (silver) (Netherlands) Ferrie Hendriks, (bronze) (Russia) Fedor Serov, (bronze) (Italy) Marco Barati
  - men's +94 kg: (gold) (France) Frederic Husson, (silver) (Romania) Mihai Neaga, (bronze) (Poland) Dariusz Zimolag, (bronze) (Russia) Sergey Kunashov
  - women's −62 kg: (gold) (France) Isabelle Bacon, (silver) (Germany) Sabrina Hatzky, (bronze) (Netherlands) Judith de Weerd, (bronze) (Spain) Margarita Montes
  - mixed duo systems: (gold) (Germany) Endele / Huber, (silver) (France) Heiremans / Heiremans, (bronze) (Netherlands) Alvarez / Van Bommel, (bronze) (Switzerland) Kümin / Bürgisser
- International rugby union:
  - Ireland defeat Australia 21–6 at Lansdowne Road in Dublin
- Tennis:
  - 2006 Tennis Masters Cup, Shanghai, finals:
    - Singles: Roger Federer (Switzerland) 6–0, 6–3, 6–4 (United States) James Blake
    - Doubles: Jonas Björkman/Max Mirnyi (Sweden) / (Belarus) 6–2, 6–4 (The Bahamas) / (Canada) Mark Knowles/Daniel Nestor
  - 2006 Wheelchair Tennis Masters, Amsterdam, finals:
    - Men's Gold medal match: Robin Ammerlaan (Netherlands) 7–6, 7–6 (Japan) Shingo Kunieda
    - Men's Bronze medal match: Michaël Jérémiasz (France) 6–3, 6–3 (Japan) Satoshi Saida
    - Women's Gold medal match: Esther Vergeer (Netherlands) 6–2, 6–1 (Netherlands) Sharon Walraven
    - Women's Bronze medal match: Jiske Griffioen (Netherlands) 6–3, 7–5 (France) Florence Gravellier
    - Quads Gold medal match: Peter Norfolk (United Kingdom) 6–1, 6–4 (United States) David Wagner
    - Quads Bronze medal match: Giuseppe Polidori (Italy) 6–7, 6–3, 6–4 (United States) Nicholas Taylor

== 18 November 2006 (Saturday) ==
- Baseball
  - Intercontinental Cup – Taichung, Taiwan, semi finals.
    - Japan 0–3 The Netherlands
    - Cuba 5–4 Chinese Taipei (Taiwan) – The Taiwanese came short in their eighth inning comeback bid, failing to repeat the upset of two nights earlier.
- Boxing: Fights at the Thomas and Mack Center, Las Vegas, Nevada (ESPN):
  - Undercard: (Mexico) Omar Niño Romero fought (United States) Brian Viloria to a majority draw; Romero retains the WBC light-flyweight (108 lbs.) championship.
  - Undercard: (Colombia) Ricardo Torres defeated (Greece) Mike Arnaoutis via a split decision to win the vacant WBO junior welterweight (140 lbs.) championship.
  - Main event: (Philippines) Manny Pacquiao knocked out (Mexico) Erik Morales in the third round to retain the WBC International super featherweight (130 lbs.) championship.
  - The card drew 18,276 people, the second largest crowd at the arena in its history.
- Cycling (track): Anna Meares sets a new World Record at the 500 m individual time trial at the 2007 UCI Track Cycling World Cup Classics meeting in Sydney. The new world best time is 33.944 seconds.
- Football (Canadian): Canadian Interuniversity Sport semifinals:
  - Uteck Bowl: (2) Laval Rouge et Or 57, (10) Acadia Axemen 10 – Laval is the beneficiary of five Axemen turnovers in the first half alone, and will make their third Vanier Cup appearance since 2003. (TSN)
  - Mitchell Bowl: (4) Saskatchewan Huskies 35, (3) Ottawa Gee-Gees 28 – Saskatchewan advances to the Vanier Cup, which will be held in their home stadium, the first for any school outside of the OUA. Tyler O'Gorman rushed for three touchdowns (two in the fourth quarter) in the Huskies victory. (TSN)
- Football (U.S. college):
  - AP NCAA Division I-A Top 25:
    - (1) Ohio State 42, (2) Michigan 39. The Buckeyes are the Big Ten champions, and clinch the Number One BCS ranking, earning a bid to the BCS Title Game, while the Wolverines could be (as the game was close) at best their opposition in Glendale, Arizona on January 8 or in the Rose Bowl on New Year's Day facing Pac-10 champion Southern California.
    - (3) Florida 62, Western Carolina 0
    - (4) Southern California 23, (17) California 9. Southern California wins no worse than a Rose Bowl bid and the Pac-10 championship for the fifth straight time outright or shared.
    - (5) Arkansas 28, Mississippi State 14. The Razorbacks lock up a spot as the West Division champion and earn a trip to the SEC Championship against Florida.
    - (6) Notre Dame 41, Army 9. The Irish don their green jerseys for Senior Day, and (in essence) win the Commander-in-Chief's Trophy defeating all three service academies (Army, Air Force and Navy).
    - Cincinnati 30, (7) Rutgers 11. The Bearcats knock Rutgers from the unbeaten ranks, and now create chaos at the top of the Big East between Rutgers, Louisville and West Virginia.
    - (9) LSU 23, Ole Miss 20 (OT). The Bayou Bengals escape the upset bid of the Rebels, and end 8–0 for the first time at home.
    - (10) Louisville 31, South Florida 8
    - (12) Wisconsin 35, Buffalo 3. The Badgers set a school record with their eleventh regular-season win.
    - (13) Boise State 49, Utah State 10. The Broncos clinch the WAC crown. Next up, a trip to Nevada for an unbeaten regular season and a chance at a BCS bowl berth.
    - (19) Virginia Tech 27, (14) Wake Forest 6
    - (15) Auburn 22, Alabama 15. Auburn wins its fifth straight Iron Bowl, its longest winning streak in the series since 1958. The Tigers also have yet to lose an Iron Bowl game in Tuscaloosa.
    - (16) Oklahoma 36, Baylor 10
    - (18) Georgia Tech 49, Duke 21. The Yellow Jackets have reserved a date in the ACC Championship December 2 in Jacksonville with this win.
    - (20) Boston College 38, (21) Maryland 16
    - (22) Tennessee 39, Vanderbilt 10
    - (23) BYU 42, New Mexico 17. The Cougars clinch the Mountain West title.
  - Other significant games:
    - Houston 23, Memphis 20 (OT). The Cougars, already assured of a spot in the Conference USA title game, secure the best overall conference record, meaning that the game will be held at their home field on December 1.
    - Penn State 17, Michigan State 13. Penn State's Joe Paterno, recovering from a broken leg suffered two weeks ago in the Wisconsin game, returns to coaching, staying in the press box on medical advice.
    - Purdue 28, Indiana 19. The Boilermakers beat the Hoosiers in the annual rivalry game for The Old Oaken Bucket. Purdue improves to an overall record of 8–4, while Indiana sees its season come to an end after failing to secure a spot in a bowl. Indiana hasn't been in a bowl game since 1991, and finishes its season at 5–7 under the helm of second year Head Coach Terry Hoeppner.
- Football (soccer):
  - CSKA Moscow retains their Russian Premier League title after winning 0–4 at FC Luch-Energia Vladivostok. FC Spartak Moscow is able to equal CSKA in points, but if that happens CSKA would still win due to having won more league matches during the season.
- Handball (beach): 2006 Beach Handball World Championships:
  - men's semi finals:
    - Brazil 2–1 Egypt
    - Turkey 2–0 Spain
  - women's semi finals:
    - Germany 2–0 Russia
    - Brazil 2–1 Bulgaria
- Handball (team): 2006 Handball World Cup semi finals:
  - Romania 27–25 Ukraine
  - Russia 32–28 Denmark
- Jujutsu: 2006 Jujutsu World Championships:
  - men's −77 kg: (gold) (Russia) Igor Rudnev, (silver) (Sweden) Johan Ingholt, (bronze) (Ukraine) Ivan Nastenko, (bronze) (Germany) Mario Staller
  - men's −94 kg: (gold) (Netherlands) Rob Haans, (silver) (Poland) Tomasz Szewczak, (bronze) (France) Vincent Parisi, (bronze) (Croatia) Vedran Ikic
  - women's −70 kg: (gold) (Netherlands) Lindsay Wyatt, (silver) (Germany) Sonja Kinz, (bronze) (Greece) Stamatiki Leontaraki, (bronze) (France) Corinne Sarcy
  - women's duo systems: (gold) (Netherlands) Alvarez / Dekker-Poort, (silver) (Germany) Altmüller / Satory, (bronze) (France) Boldi / Jasset, (bronze) (Sweden) Persson / Eriksson
- Rugby league: 2006 Rugby League Tri-Nations:
  - Australia beats (United Kingdom) Great Britain 33–10 at Suncorp Stadium in Brisbane.
- Rugby union internationals: Autumn Internationals
  - Wales defeat Canada 61–26 in a Test at Millennium Stadium in Cardiff.
  - England defeat South Africa 23–21 at Twickenham Stadium in London. England ends their seven-game losing streak.
  - Scotland defeat Pacific Islanders 34–22 at Murrayfield Stadium in Edinburgh.
  - Argentina defeat Italy 16–23 at Stadio Flaminio in Rome.
  - New Zealand defeat France 11–23 at Stade de France in Saint-Denis.
- Tennis: 2006 Tennis Masters Cup, Shanghai, semi finals:
  - Singles:
    - Roger Federer (Switzerland) 6–4, 7–5 (Spain) Rafael Nadal
    - James Blake (United States) 6–4, 6–1 (Argentina) David Nalbandian
  - Doubles:
    - Mark Knowles/Daniel Nestor (The Bahamas) / (Canada) 4–6, 6–1, 6–3 (Australia) / (Zimbabwe) Paul Hanley/Kevin Ullyett
    - Jonas Björkman/Max Mirnyi (Sweden) / (Belarus) 6–7, 7–6, 7–6 (Czech Republic) / (India) Martin Damm/Leander Paes

== 17 November 2006 (Friday) ==
- Major League Baseball: Bob Geren has been promoted to manager of the Oakland Athletics after a month-long search to replace Ken Macha.
- Cycling:
  - When signing his new contract with Team Discovery Channel, Ivan Basso said he is willing to undergo a DNA test to clarify he is innocent in the doping scandal of the 2006 Tour de France. It is unknown whether this will happen or not.
- Domino Day:
  - For the eighth time in nine years the world record for the highest number of falling domino stones is broken during Domino Day. In Leeuwarden 4,079,381 out of 4,500,000 domino stones fell, breaking the world record by 77,245 stones.
- College Football: On the eve of the #1 Ohio State vs. #2 Michigan game, former Wolverines head coach Bo Schembechler died at the age of 77 after collapsing outside the studios of WXYZ-TV near Detroit.
- Jujutsu: 2006 Jujutsu World Championships:
  - men's −62 kg: (gold) (Denmark) Anders Lauridsen, (silver) (Spain) Francisco García, (bronze) (France) Nicolas Gimenez, (bronze) (Austria) Oliver Haider
  - men's −85 kg: (gold) (Germany) Andreas Kuhl, (silver) (Russia) Dmitry Nebolsin, (bronze) (Denmark) Jakob Tideman, (bronze) (France) Franck Vatan
  - men's duo systems: (gold) (Switzerland) P. Müller / R. Müller, (silver) (France) Ben Boudaoud / Cordesse, (bronze) (Netherlands) Van Bommel / Soechit, (bronze) (Germany) Goldbeck / Schmidt
  - women's −55 kg: (gold) (France) Annabelle Reydy, (silver) (Sweden) Linda Lindström, (bronze) (Germany) Andrea Pflefka, (bronze) (Poland) Monika Dikow-Iwanow
  - women's −70 kg: (gold) (Denmark) Taja Luthje, (silver) (Netherlands) Albertine Los, (bronze) (France) Melanie Lavis, (bronze) (Germany) Seher Dumanli
- Tennis: 2006 Tennis Masters Cup, Shanghai:
  - Singles, Gold group: Rafael Nadal beats Nikolay Davydenko 5–7, 6–4, 6–4 to claim his spot in the semi-finals alongside James Blake who lost his last match versus Tommy Robredo 6–2, 3–6, 7–5, but still became group winner. Second seed Nadal will now meet first seed Roger Federer in the semi-finals.
  - Doubles, Gold group: Jonas Björkman and Max Mirnyi qualify for the semi-finals as the group winners. They will be joined by Mark Knowles and Daniel Nestor who won their last match versus Mariusz Fyrstenberg and Marcin Matkowski. Fabrice Santoro and Nenad Zimonjić are eliminated as well.
- Other sports:
  - Speed skating: 2007 Speed Skating World Cup meeting in Berlin
  - Track cycling: 2007 UCI Track Cycling World Cup Classics meeting in Sydney

== 16 November 2006 (Thursday) ==
- Baseball
  - Intercontinental Cup – Taichung, Taiwan. All times GMT+9
    - Italy 1–5 South Korea Italy eliminated from medal contention.
    - Japan 17–0 The Philippines (6½ innings – mercy rule)
    - The Netherlands 4–3 Australia (11 innings) – Dutch gain the third qualifying spot. Australia eliminated from medal round.
    - Chinese Taipei (Taiwan) 4–3 Cuba Taiwan stuns Cuba to advance to the medal round, inspired by Chien-Ming Wang, who made an appearance before the game.
  - Major League Baseball For the second time in three years, Johan Santana of the Minnesota Twins wins the American League Cy Young Award with a unanimous vote.
- Football (U.S. college):
  - AP NCAA Division I-A Top 25
    - (8) West Virginia 45, Pittsburgh 27. The Mountaineers win the Backyard Brawl, with quarterback Patrick White and running back Steve Slaton each rushing for over 200 yards and two touchdowns. White adds two TD passes, and Slaton also becomes the first WVU player ever to gain 100 yards rushing and 100 yards receiving in the same game.
  - Other significant games:
    - Ohio 17, Akron 7. The Bobcats win the MAC East Division, and will play Central Michigan on November 30 in Detroit for the MAC crown.
- Football (soccer):
  - Bora Milutinović who coached five different nations to a FIFA World Cup tournament is appointed as the new coach of Jamaica. In Mexico former Real Madrid player Hugo Sánchez is appointed as their national coach to replace Ricardo La Volpe whose contract was not renewed after the 2006 FIFA World Cup.
  - The KBVB is doing research to whether Jacek Bąk's story about a possible attempt to bribe him before the Euro 2008 qualifier between Belgium and Poland is true or not. The Polish international said he would have been awarded €10,000 if he caused a penalty in Belgian favour.
- Rugby union:
  - The South African Rugby Union, its commercial arm of SA Rugby, and the Southern Spears reach a settlement of the court case that threatened to throw a monkey wrench into the 2007 Super 14 season. The financially troubled Spears drop their lawsuit against the SARU and SA Rugby, and abandon their quest to enter the Super 14. This means that the Lions, formerly the Cats, are spared from relegation and will play in the 2007 Super 14. (Planet-Rugby.com)
- Tennis: 2006 Tennis Masters Cup, Shanghai:
  - Singles, Red group: Roger Federer beats Ivan Ljubičić 7–6, 6–4 and wins all three of his group matches. David Nalbandian joins Federer in the semi-finals after he beat Andy Roddick 6–2, 7–6 in the decisive match.
  - Doubles, Red group: Paul Hanley and Kevin Ullyett qualify for the semi-finals as the group winners. They will be joined by Martin Damm and Leander Paes who won the confrontation with Jonathan Erlich and Andy Ram. The brothers and first seeds Bob and Mike Bryan are eliminated as well.
- Volleyball: 2006 FIVB Women's World Championship finals:
  - Gold medal match: Russia 3–2 Brazil
  - Bronze medal match: Italy 0–3 Serbia

== 15 November 2006 (Wednesday) ==
- Auto racing: Formula One:
  - Anthony Davidson will be the second driver of the Super Aguri F1 team during the 2007 Formula One season. Takuma Sato remains the first driver of the team.
- Baseball
  - Intercontinental Cup, Taichung, Taiwan – Sixth day of round-robin play. Game times Taichung time (UTC+8)
    - Italy 3–6 Japan – Japan clinches at least second seed, Italy's hopes are very faint
    - South Korea 2–13 The Netherlands (8 innings mercy rule) – South Korea is eliminated. The Dutch are in the driver's seat for third, but have yet to clinch medal round berth..
    - Cuba 13–0 Australia (5 innings – rain) – Cuba clinches top seed; Australia falls to fifth
    - The Philippines 0–14 Chinese Taipei (Taiwan) (6 innings – rain) – Chinese Taipei (Taiwan) moves into fourth with one day to go in round-robin
  - Major League Baseball
    - Despite being fired by the Florida Marlins, Joe Girardi was named winner of the 2006 National League Manager of the Year. Girardi will serve as an analyst with the YES Network for New York Yankees telecasts in 2007. Meanwhile, Detroit Tigers skipper Jim Leyland wins the honors in the American League, his third overall as previous awards were won with the Pittsburgh Pirates in 1990 and again in 1992.
    - The Seibu Lions will receive a $51.1 million (US) fee from the Boston Red Sox for a 30-day negotiation period with Lions pitcher Daisuke Matsuzaka as announced in a newsconference held at 10 AM in Tokyo. The fee would only be refundable if the Red Sox fail to sign him before the end of the period. The previous high fee for negotiations was the $13.25 million (US) the Seattle Mariners paid for a 30-day period with Ichiro in 2000. ESPN.com story
- Basketball:
  - Egyptian basketball team Gezira Sports Club withdraws their entry into the 2006 Haarlem Basketball Week due to the appearance of the Israel national basketball team. The Egyptian government forbids their team to play in the same tournament, even when drawn in separate groups as there would be an opportunity to face each other in the final.
- Cycling:
  - The French anti-doping lab of Chatenay-Malabry that tested Floyd Landis' urine samples made an administrative error when reporting its findings on his backup B-sample. In its report, the lab wrote that the B-sample tested was number 994,474, while the actual number was 995,474. The error does not mean the positive B-sample was not that of Landis, but it will be used by his lawyers.
- Field hockey:
  - Sylvia Karres, Chantal de Bruijn and Eveline de Haan will no longer play in international matches for the Netherlands women's national field hockey team. The three leave the team that became World Champion this year for personal reasons. Karres was top goalscorer of the tournament when the Netherlands became World Champion.
- Football (soccer)
  - 2007 AFC Asian Cup qualification – 11 matches, but only three affect qualification as ten of twelve qualifying spots are taken.
    - Group D: Bahrain 2–1 Kuwait – Bahrain got the win they needed to qualify from the group.
    - Group F: Uzbekistan 2–0 Qatar – The win was more than Uzbekistan required, they needed to avoid a 10-goal defeat against the group leaders.
    - The Singapore–Palestine clash is called off due to travel difficulties for the visitors.
    - Japan (Group A) and Iran (Group B) win top-of-the-table clashes to take top spots in their groups ahead of Saudi Arabia and South Korea.
  - 2008 UEFA European Football Championship qualifying
    - Group A: Finland 1–0 Armenia
    - Group A: Belgium 0–1 Poland
    - Group A: Portugal 3–0 Kazakhstan
    - Group D: Republic of Ireland 5–0 San Marino – Ireland give their old Lansdowne Road stadium a fine send off in the last match before it is rebuilt.
    - Group D: Cyprus 1–1 Germany – Germany lose their 100% record.
    - Group E: North Macedonia 0–2 Russia
    - Group E: Israel 3–4 Croatia – Israel's first home defeat in three and a half years.
  - General news:
    - During the rest of the season in the Argentine Primera División, no more visiting fans are allowed into the stadiums due to heavy violence in the last couple of weeks. On November 12 the match between Independiente and Racing Club was suspended when Racing fans attacked police forces inside the stadium. It was the third match this season that was suspended due to supporter's violence.
    - Clarence Seedorf made his comeback in Oranje during the friendly match versus England. Seedorf who had his last cap at 30 June 2004 played the whole 90 minutes. It was the first time he played a match under the current manager Marco van Basten.
- Snooker: 2006 IBSF World Championships:
  - men's final:
    - (Norway) Kurt Maflin def. (England) Daniel Ward 11–8
- Tennis: 2006 Tennis Masters Cup, Shanghai:
  - Golden group: James Blake advances to the semi-finals by beating Nikolay Davydenko 2–6, 6–4, 7–5. Rafael Nadal wins 7–6, 6–2 versus Tommy Robredo. Nadal and Davydenko face each other for a place in the semi-finals.
- Volleyball: 2006 FIVB Women's World Championship semi finals:
  - Italy 0–3 Russia
  - Brazil 3–1 Serbia

== 14 November 2006 (Tuesday) ==
- Baseball
  - Intercontinental Cup (Taichung, Taiwan) – Day five of round-robin games.
    - Cuba 6–3 Japan Cuba wins the battle of undefeated teams and is the first to clinch a medal round berth.
    - Italy 9–0 The Philippines Italy stays in the medal hunt, improves to 2–3.
    - Australia 10–9 South Korea – Australia gets a big win to move into fourth, virtually eliminating South Korea in the process.
    - Chinese Taipei (Taiwan) 2–4 The Netherlands (10 innings) – Dutch stay in third with the victory, dropping the Taiwanese to sixth, but not without hope.
  - Major League Baseball:
    - Brandon Webb of the Arizona Diamondbacks wins the National League Cy Young Award.
    - Manny Acta, who was the third base coach under Frank Robinson with the late Montreal Expos, returns to the franchise replacing Robinson as manager of the Washington Nationals.
- Cricket
  - West Indies in Pakistan, First Test at Gaddafi Stadium, Lahore: Pakistan defeats West Indies by nine wickets. West Indies, having won the toss and electing to bat, were dismissed for 206 in their first innings, Umar Gul taking 5/65. Pakistan's response was centred around Mohammad Yousuf's innings of 192; with support from Kamran Akmal, Shoaib Malik and Mohammad Hafeez, Pakistan compiled a healthy 485. Despite a century (122) from captain Brian Lara, Umar Gul claimed another four wickets to restrict the visitors to 291, a lead of only 13. Pakistan achieved the total with the loss of only one wicket, that of Hafeez in the third over. (Scorecard)
- Football (American): The New England Patriots will install FieldTurf, an artificial surface, into Gillette Stadium to replace a poorly maintained grass surface effective for their November 26 game against the Chicago Bears. Normally, the change could not take place until the following season, but there was no such rule in the NFL, according to Patriots owner Robert Kraft. A game two days earlier where they lost to the New York Jets in a steady downpour when a new grass surface installed one week earlier gradually became worse throughout the game, was the main cause of the decision.
- Football (soccer): General news:
  - Pep Guardiola ends his career at the age of 35. Guardiola won La Liga six times, the Copa del Rey as well as the European Cup, the UEFA Cup Winners' Cup and the gold medal at the 1992 Summer Olympics.
  - Charlton Athletic appoints Les Reed as their new manager to replace Iain Dowie. Reed was Dowie's assistant before he left the club.
- Snooker: 2006 IBSF World Championships:
  - men's quarter finals:
    - (India) Manan Chandra def. (England) Craig Steadman 6–3
    - (England) Daniel Ward def. (Hong Kong) Fung Kwok Wai 6–3
    - (Norway) Kurt Maflin def. (Wales) Philip Williams 6–3
  - men's semi finals:
    - (England) Daniel Ward def. (India) Manan Chandra 8–7
    - (Norway) Kurt Maflin def. (Thailand) Atthasit Mahitthi 8–4
  - women's semi finals:
    - (Belgium) Wendy Jans def. (New Zealand) Ramona Belmont 4–0
    - (Hong Kong) Jaique Ip def. (India) Anuja Thakur 4–2
  - women's final:
    - (Belgium) Wendy Jans def. (Hong Kong) Jaique Ip 5–0
- Tennis: 2006 Tennis Masters Cup, Shanghai:
  - Red group: Roger Federer wins his second match again in 3 sets after he lost the first versus Andy Roddick: 4–6, 7–6, 6–4. Ivan Ljubičić kept his chances alive by beating David Nalbandian 5–7, 7–6, 7–5.

== 13 November 2006 (Monday) ==
- Baseball
  - 2006 Major League Baseball Rookie of the Year Awards: Detroit Tigers pitcher Justin Verlander easily wins the American League honors while Florida Marlins shortstop Hanley Ramírez edges Washington Nationals third baseman Ryan Zimmerman for the National League award by four points.
- American football
  - NFL Monday Night Football: Carolina Panthers 23, Tampa Bay Buccaneers 10. The Panthers needed a late Jake Delhomme touchdown pass to Steve Smith as the Bucs began a string of three games in eleven days with a loss.
- Olympic Games
  - San Francisco abandons its bid for the 2016 Summer Olympics following the announcement that the San Francisco 49ers plan to leave Candlestick Park for a venue in Silicon Valley, leaving only Chicago and Los Angeles (which hosted in 1932 and 1984) as the two US contenders. (Fox Sports)
- Football (soccer): General news:
  - In the first managerial change of the Premiership in England, Iain Dowie was released as manager of bottom dwelling Charlton Athletic.
  - Attilio Tesser was also sacked after only winning four points out of eleven matches at Ascoli. He is immediately replaced by Nedo Sonetti.
  - Also Lierse fired their manager. René Trost was only able to help his team win two points out of twelve matches.
- Tennis: 2006 Tennis Masters Cup, Shanghai:
  - Golden group: James Blake upsets the number two seed Rafael Nadal in a 6–4, 7–6 win. Nikolay Davydenko wins his first match in three sets versus Tommy Robredo: 7–6, 3–6, 6–1.

== 12 November 2006 (Sunday) ==
- Athletics:
  - Asafa Powell, who equalled the 100m world record twice in 2006 and won all six Golden League meetings, is named IAAF Athlete of the Year in the men's category. Sanya Richards won the women's award for her achievements in this year. Richards broke Valerie Brisco-Hooks' 1984 US national record and also won all Golden League meetings at her distance, the 400m.
- Auto racing
  - 2006–07 A1 Grand Prix of Nations, Beijing, China:
    - sprint race: (1) (Netherlands) Jeroen Bleekemolen, (2) (Mexico) Salvador Durán, (3) (Italy) Enrico Toccacelo
    - main race: (1) (Italy) Enrico Toccacelo, (2) (United Kingdom) Oliver Jarvis, (3) (Australia) Karl Reindler
  - Chase for the NEXTEL Cup: Checker Auto Parts 500 in Avondale, Arizona
    - (1) Kevin Harvick, (2) Jimmie Johnson, (3) Denny Hamlin. Kevin Harvick takes the checkered flag, but Jimmie Johnson can finish 12th or better next week at Miami and win the title.
- Baseball:
  - 2006 Konami Cup Asia Series in Tokyo, Japan: Championship Game
    - Hokkaido Nippon Ham Fighters (Japan) 1–0 La New Bears (Taiwan) – Japanese team wins Asian championship for the second year in a row.
  - 2006 Intercontinental Cup in Taichung, Taiwan: Fourth day of round-robin play
    - South Korea 7–9 Chinese Taipei (Taiwan) (12 innings) Taiwan crushes four home runs including Taichung Intercontinental Baseball Stadium's first ever grand slam in its first ever extra-inning game.
    - The Netherlands 0–3 Japan Japan stays undefeated heading into the rest day
    - The Philippines 0–24 Cuba (7 innings mercy rule) – 15-run first inning powers the Cubans
    - Australia 8–7 Italy (13 innings) – Australia joins the Taiwanese and the Dutch at 2–2.
- Beach soccer: FIFA Beach Soccer World Cup 2006 finals:
  - Gold medal match: Brazil 4–1 Uruguay
  - Bronze medal match: Portugal 4–6 France
- Billiards: 2006 WPA Men's World Nine-ball Championship in Pasay, Metro Manila, Philippines – Final, race to 17 racks:
  - (Philippines) Ronato Alcano def. (Germany) Ralf Souquet, 17–11
- Figure skating: Cup of China, Nanjing as part of the 2006 ISU Grand Prix of Figure Skating:
  - Ice dancing: (gold) (Russia) Oksana Domnina / Maxim Shabalin, (silver) (United States) Tanith Belbin / Benjamin Agosto, (bronze) (Russia) Jana Khokhlova / Sergei Novitski
- American football: NFL Week 10:
  - Baltimore Ravens 27, Tennessee Titans 26. Steve McNair leads the Ravens back from a 26–7 deficit with a 373-yard day against his former team.
  - Indianapolis Colts 17, Buffalo Bills 16. The Colts go to 9–0 for the second straight year after Rian Lindell misses a late 41-yard field-goal attempt.
  - Cleveland Browns 17, Atlanta Falcons 13. Michael Vick ends a horrible game by fumbling in Browns territory with 2:18 left.
  - Green Bay Packers 23, Minnesota Vikings 17. Brett Favre avoids another Metrodome meltdown with a 347-yard performance. The Packers go ahead for good on an 82-yard pass from Favre to Donald Driver shortly before halftime.
  - Houston Texans 13, Jacksonville Jaguars 10. David Garrard throws four interceptions in the Jaguars' second loss to Houston this season.
  - Miami Dolphins 13, Kansas City Chiefs 10. The Dolphins go up 13–0 before Kansas City gains a first down and win their second game in a row.
  - New York Jets 17, New England Patriots 14. Chad Pennington's 22-yard touchdown pass to Jerricho Cotchery in the fourth quarter clinches the Jets' win and the Patriots' first back-to-back losses in 57 games.
  - San Diego Chargers 49, Cincinnati Bengals 41. LaDainian Tomlinson rushes for four touchdowns as the Lightning Bolts storm back from a 21-point halftime deficit to beat the Bengals. Carson Palmer throws for 440 yards and Chad Johnson runs up a club-record 260 receiving yards in losing efforts.
  - San Francisco 49ers 19, Detroit Lions 13. Frank Gore rushes for a 49ers-record 159 rushing yards before exiting with a concussion in the win.
  - Philadelphia Eagles 27, Washington Redskins 3. The Eagles swamp the Redskins in a steady rain thanks to two offensive touchdowns and a defensive touchdown.
  - Denver Broncos 17, Oakland Raiders 13. After Denver takes the lead on a Kyle Johnson touchdown reception, Andrew Walter loses fumbles on two consecutive offensive plays to end the Raiders' comeback attempt.
  - Dallas Cowboys 27 Arizona Cardinals 10. Tony Romo's solid performance for Dallas sends the Cardinals to their eighth-straight loss.
  - Pittsburgh Steelers 38, New Orleans Saints 31. Willie Parker runs for 213 yards and two fourth-quarter touchdowns.
  - Seattle Seahawks 24, St. Louis Rams 22. For the second time this year, the Seahawks beat the Rams on a last-minute Josh Brown field goal.
  - Chicago Bears 38, New York Giants 20. Rookie Devin Hester's record-tying 108-yard return of a missed Jay Feely 54-yard field goal in the fourth quarter broke the game open in the first "Flex Game" in NFL history.
- Canadian football: CFL Playoffs
  - East Division Final: Montreal Alouettes 33, Toronto Argonauts 24. The 2004 Grey Cup champs are knocked out at Montreal, allowing Les Als a trip to the Grey Cup championship game for the fourth time in five years.
  - West Division Final: BC Lions 45, Saskatchewan Roughriders 13. The Lions maul the Riders winning the West and a trip to next week's final game in Winnipeg.
- Football (soccer):
  - General news:
    - The government of Tilburg claims €100,000 to be paid by Feyenoord Rotterdam for using more police forces than planned during the match Willem II vs. Feyenoord. 250 extra police officers were used as Feyenoord fans decided to go to Tilburg on their own instead of using the bus combi that they organised out of Rotterdam because they said there were problems with the supporters last year. Feyenoord and their supporters objected and decided not to work along with Tilburg. The match which ended in a 3–5 win to Feyenoord was eventually visited by just 1 Feyenoord supporter that came with the combi bus. Hundreds of other Feyenoord fans were outside the Willem II Stadion to protest. 86 of them were taken in custody.
    - Due to Wesley Sneijder's injury, Netherlands national football team manager Marco van Basten calls up Clarence Seedorf to replace him. The A.C. Milan midfielder had his last international cap during the Euro 2004 semifinal match against Portugal.
  - 2006 MLS Cup Finals at Frisco, Texas
    - New England Revolution 1–1 Houston Dynamo Houston Dynamo win 4–3 on penalties.

The Dynamo win the MLS Cup in their first season (their third overall as the previous two were as the San Jose Earthquakes) in a game where Revs forward Taylor Twellman and Dynamo striker Brian Ching score within 66 seconds of each other in the second overtime period.

- Golf: 2007 European Tour: HSBC Champions Tournament
    - Yang Yong-eun wins his first European Tour event by finishing 14 under par and 2 strokes in front of Tiger Woods. Michael Campbell and Retief Goosen share the third spot.
- Tennis:
  - 2006 WTA Tour Championships, Madrid, Final:
    - Singles: (Belgium) Justine Henin-Hardenne 6–4 6–3 (France) Amélie Mauresmo; "Juju" finishes the year as world number one (ladies singles) and WTA Champion.
    - Doubles: (United States) / (Australia) Lisa Raymond / Samantha Stosur 3–6, 6–3, 6–3 Cara Black / Rennae Stubbs (Zimbabwe) / (Australia)
  - 2006 Tennis Masters Cup, Shanghai:
    - Red group: Roger Federer loses the first set to David Nalbandian but recovers to win the following sets easily: 3–6, 6–1, 6–1. Ivan Ljubičić managed to win the second set versus Andy Roddick. The American, however, won the first and the third set to claim the victory: 6–4, 6–7, 6–1.
- Winter sports:
  - Alpine skiing: 2007 Alpine Skiing World Cup meeting in Levi
  - Cyclo-cross: 2006/07 UCI Cyclo-cross World Cup meeting in Pijnacker
  - Snowboarding: 2007 Snowboarding World Cup meeting in Stockholm
  - Speed skating: 2007 Speed Skating World Cup meeting in Heerenveen

== 11 November 2006 (Saturday) ==
- Baseball
  - Final day of round-robin play at the 2006 Konami Cup Asia Series in Tokyo, Japan.
    - (Japan) Hokkaido Nippon Ham Fighters 6–1 China Stars – Japanese teams are now 7–0 in the two-year history of the tournament while China is 0–6.
    - (Taiwan) La New Bears 3–2 v. Samsung Lions (South Korea) — Bears face the Fighters in the championship game tomorrow.
  - Third day of round-robin play at the 2006 Intercontinental Cup in Taichung, Taiwan.
    - Italy 0–9 Cuba – Cuba remains one of two unbeaten teams left in the tournament.
    - Chinese Taipei (Taiwan) 4–2 Australia – The Taiwanese score four in the eighth to register their first win of the tournament.
    - The Philippines 0–22 The Netherlands (7 innings – mercy rule) – The Philippines remain the only winless team as the Dutch score the biggest rout of the tournament so far.
    - Japan 2–1 South Korea – Japan scores two in the bottom of the ninth to remain undefeated.
- Beach soccer: FIFA Beach Soccer World Cup 2006 semi finals:
  - Brazil 7–4 Portugal
  - Uruguay 2–2 (1–0 PSO) France
- Billiards: 2006 WPA Men's World Nine-ball Championship in Pasay, Metro Manila, Philippines
  - Quarterfinals, all matches races to 11 racks
    - (Philippines) Ronato Alcano def. (Chinese Taipei) Wu Jia-qing, 11–6
    - (China) Li Hewen def. (Vietnam) Lương Chí Dũng, 11–7
    - (Germany) Ralf Souquet def. (Chinese Taipei) Liu Cheng-chuan, 11–8
    - (Chinese Taipei) Fu Che-wei def. (Philippines) Rodolfo Luat, 11–7
  - Semifinals, all matches races to 11 racks
    - (Philippines) Ronato Alcano def. (Chinese Taipei) Li Hewen 11–8
    - (Germany) Ralf Souquet def. (Chinese Taipei) Fu Che-wei, 11–10
- Canadian football: Canadian Interuniversity Sport division finals: (TSN)
  - Dunsmore Cup: (2) Laval Rouge et Or 28, (6) Concordia Stingers 12 – Laval's Nicolas Bisaillon's 196 all-purpose yards help the Rouge et Or to their fourth consecutive Dunsmore Cup victory
  - Jewett Trophy: (10) Acadia Axemen 32, Saint Mary's Huskies 24 – Acadia quarterback Naija Coley threw for three touchdowns, helping the Axemen win the inaugural Loney Bowl game.
  - Hardy Trophy: (4) Saskatchewan Huskies 32, (1) Manitoba Bisons 15 – Saskatchewan ends Manitoba's undefeated run, thanks to an outstanding performance by Tyler O'Gorman, who rushed 10 times for 140 yards, including a 74-yard touchdown.
  - Yates Cup: (3) Ottawa Gee-Gees 32, (7) Wilfrid Laurier Golden Hawks 24 – Ottawa running back Mark Lindel rushes for two fourth-quarter touchdowns, while quarterback Joshua Sacobie threw for 220 yards in the victory.
- Football (U.S. college): AP NCAA Division I-A Top 25
  - (1) Ohio State 54, Northwestern 10
  - (2) Michigan 34, Indiana 3
    - With both teams winning easily, the stage is set for next Saturday's showdown between #1 and #2 for the second time this season.
  - Kansas State 45, (4) Texas 42. The Longhorns suffer three losses in one: QB Colt McCoy hurts his right (throwing) shoulder while scoring their first TD, they go on to lose the game, and they lose any chance of repeating as national champions.
  - Georgia 37, (5) Auburn 15. Any hopes of even getting to the SEC Championship Game for the Tigers are damaged by their worst defensive performance scorewise in three years.
  - (6) Florida 17, South Carolina 16. In Steve Spurrier's return to his alma mater as the visiting coach, the Gators survive only after they block a last-second Gamecocks field goal attempt after blocking a PAT and another field goal attempt.
  - (7) Southern California 35, (21) Oregon 10
  - Arizona 24, (8) California 20. The Wildcats shock the Bears at home.
  - (9) Notre Dame 39, Air Force 17
  - (10) West Virginia 42, Cincinnati 24
  - (11) Arkansas 31, (13) Tennessee 14. Arkansas moves one step closer to a SEC Championship Game berth against Florida with a win.
  - (12) LSU 28, Alabama 14
  - (14) Boise State 23, San Jose State 20. The Broncos survive a scare in San Jose, staying unbeaten thanks to Anthony Montgomery's 37-yard field goal as time runs out.
  - (16) Wisconsin 24, Iowa 21
  - (17) Oklahoma 34, Texas Tech 24
  - (18) Wake Forest 30, Florida State 0. The Demon Deacons crush the seminoles, winning in Tallahassee for the first time since 1959, and secure their first nine-win season ever.
  - (19) Georgia Tech 7, North Carolina 0. The Yellow Jackets book a spot in the ACC championship game to be held December 2 in Jacksonville, Florida.
  - (20) Virginia Tech 23, Kent State 0
  - (22) Boston College 28, Duke 7
  - (23) Maryland 14, Miami (FL) 13. The Canes, coping with the death of Bryan Pata earlier in the week in a shooting near the practice facilities, lose three straight for the first time since 1999.
  - Nebraska 28, (24) Texas A&M 27. The Huskers' win clinches the Big 12 North Division crown and a place in the conference title game on December 2 in Kansas City.
- Figure skating: Cup of China, Nanjing as part of the 2006 ISU Grand Prix of Figure Skating:
  - Men: (gold) (United States) Evan Lysacek, (silver) (Belarus) Sergei Davydov, (bronze) (Canada) Emanuel Sandhu
  - Women: (gold) (Hungary) Júlia Sebestyén, (silver) (Japan) Yukari Nakano, (bronze) (United States) Emily Hughes
- Football (soccer):
  - 2006 CAF Champions League: Final, second leg:
    - (Tunisia) CS Sfaxien 0–1 Al Ahly (Egypt) , first leg 1–1. Al Ahly claims their fifth CAF Champions League trophy.
  - 2006 Women's African Football Championship: Gold medal match:
    - Nigeria 1–0 Ghana
- Women's ice hockey: 2006 4 Nations Cup:
  - Gold medal match: Canada 5–2 United States
  - Bronze medal match: Sweden 3–2 Finland
- Rugby league: 2006 Rugby League Tri-Nations:
  - New Zealand thrash (United Kingdom) Great Britain by 34–4 at Westpac Stadium, Wellington.
- Rugby union:
  - Wales beat Pacific Islanders by 38–20 in a one-off international at Millennium Stadium in Cardiff. The Pacific Islanders are a joint team representing Fiji, Samoa, and Tonga.
  - England 18–25 Argentina. England crash to their seventh successive international defeat.
  - Scotland 48–6 Romania
  - Italy 18–25 Australia
  - Ireland 32–15 South Africa. This was only Ireland's third victory over South Africa in fifteen games.
  - France 3–47 New Zealand
- Tennis: 2006 WTA Tour Championships, Madrid, Semi finals:
  - singles:
    - (France) Amélie Mauresmo 6–3, 3–6, 6–3 Kim Clijsters (Belgium)
    - (Belgium) Justine Henin-Hardenne 6–2, 7–6 Maria Sharapova (Russia)
    - Amélie Mauresmo and Justine Henin-Hardenne advance to the final and will play each other two times in three days after Fridays group stage match.
  - doubles:
    - (Zimbabwe) / (Australia) Cara Black / Rennae Stubbs 7–5, 2–6, 7–5 Yan Zi / Zheng Jie (China) / (China)
    - (United States) / (Australia) Lisa Raymond / Samantha Stosur 6–1, 6–4 Květa Peschke / Francesca Schiavone (Czech Republic) / (Italy)
- Winter sports:
  - Alpine skiing: 2007 Alpine Skiing World Cup meeting in Levi
  - Snowboarding: 2007 Snowboarding World Cup meeting in Stockholm
  - Speed skating: 2007 Speed Skating World Cup meeting in Heerenveen

== 10 November 2006 (Friday) ==
- Alpine skiing:
  - Fredrik Nyberg falls during a training run in Austria and suffers a heavy knee injury, which forces him to end his career at the age of 37.
- Baseball:
  - Day two of round-robin play at the 2006 Konami Cup Asia Series in Tokyo, Japan.
    - (South Korea) Samsung Lions 13–1 China Stars (6½ innings – mercy rule)
    - (Taiwan) La New Bears 1–2 Hokkaido Nippon Ham Fighters (Japan) — Fighters advance to the championship game on Sunday.
  - Day two of round-robin play at the 2006 Intercontinental Cup in Taichung, Taiwan.
    - The Philippines 2–12 Australia (8 innings – mercy rule)
    - South Korea 1–8 Cuba
    - Japan 4–3 Chinese Taipei (Taiwan)
    - The Netherlands 10–8 Italy
  - The New York Yankees trade Gary Sheffield to the Detroit Tigers for three players days after his option was picked up by the Yankees.
- Billiards: 2006 WPA Men's World Nine-ball Championship in Pasay, Metro Manila, Philippines — Round of 16, all matches races to 11 racks
  - (Philippines) Ronato Alcano def. (Chinese Taipei) Kuo Po-cheng, 11–5
  - (Chinese Taipei) Wu Jia-qing def. (Scotland) Pat Holtz, 11–6
  - (Vietnam) Lương Chí Dũng def. (Philippines) Jeff de Luna, 11–6
  - (China) Li Hewen def. (Serbia) Sandor Tot, 11–7
  - (Chinese Taipei) Liu Cheng-chuan def. (Canada) Tyler Edey 11–6
  - (Germany) Ralf Souquet def. (Russia) Konstantin Stepanov, 11–4
  - (Philippines) Rodolfo Luat def. (Spain) David Alcaide, 11–10
  - (Chinese Taipei) Fu Che-wei def. (England) Steve Davis, 11–8
- Figure skating: Cup of China, Nanjing as part of the 2006 ISU Grand Prix of Figure Skating:
  - Pairs: (gold) (China) Shen Xue / Zhao Hongbo, (silver) (China) Pang Qing / Tong Jian, (bronze) (Germany) Aliona Savchenko / Robin Szolkowy
- Football (soccer):
  - Dunfermline Athletic appoints Stephen Kenny as their new manager to replace Jim Leishman. Kerry comes over from Derry City.
  - 2006 Women's African Football Championship: Bronze medal match:
    - Cameroon 2–2, 4–5 (PSO) South Africa
- Tennis: 2006 WTA Tour Championships, Madrid:
  - Yellow Group: Amélie Mauresmo beats Justine Henin-Hardenne 4–6, 7–6, 6–2 in the final match of the group and secures her spot in the semi-finals.
  - Red Group: Maria Sharapova holds her unbeaten run by winning 6–1, 6–4 over Svetlana Kuznetsova. Kim Clijsters advances to the semi-finals alongside Sharapova after beating Elena Dementieva 6–4, 6–0, leaving her as the only player without winning a set or points in the tournament.
- Winter sports:
  - Speed skating: 2007 Speed Skating World Cup meeting in Heerenveen

== 9 November 2006 (Thursday) ==
- Baseball:
  - 2006 Konami Cup Asia Series began today in Tokyo, Japan.
    - (Taiwan) La New Bears 12–2 China Stars (7½ innings – mercy rule)
    - (South Korea) Samsung Lions 1–7 Hokkaido Nippon Ham Fighters (Japan)
  - 2006 Intercontinental Cup began today in Taichung, Taiwan
    - Cuba 3–2 The Netherlands
    - South Korea 10–0 The Philippines (6½ innings – mercy rule)
    - Japan 4–3 Australia (10 innings)
    - Chinese Taipei 3–13 Italy
- Beach soccer: FIFA Beach Soccer World Cup 2006 quarter finals:
  - Brazil 12–1 Canada
  - Portugal 6–2 Bahrain
  - Uruguay 2–1 Argentina
  - France 3–2 Japan
- Bowling: 2006 AMF World Cup:
  - men's finals: (gold) (Canada) Michael Schmidt, (silver) (Norway) Petter Hansen, (bronze) (Australia) Jason Walsh
  - men's combined: (gold) (Finland) Osku Palermaa, (silver) (Canada) Michael Schmidt, (bronze) (Norway) Petter Hansen
  - women's finals: (gold) (United States) Diandra Asbaty, (silver) (Sweden) Helén Johnsson, (bronze) (England) Lisa John, (bronze) (Dominican Republic) Aumi Guerra
  - women's combined: (gold) (United States) Diandra Asbaty, (silver) (Denmark) Mai Ginge Jensen, (bronze) (England) Lisa John
- American college football, AP NCAA Division I-A Top 25:
  - (15) Rutgers 28, (3) Louisville 25. Jeremy Ito's 28-yard field goal with 13 seconds left gave the Scarlet Knights the biggest win in their 137 years of playing the game, knocking the Cards from any National Title Game hopes.
  - (25) BYU 55, Wyoming 7
- Football (soccer):
  - Just one day after being fired by S.C Braga Carlos Carvalhal is appointed as the new manager of Beira Mar to replace Augusto Inácio.
- Tennis: 2006 WTA Tour Championships, Madrid:
  - Yellow Group: Justine Henin-Hardenne secures her spot in the semi-finals by beating Nadia Petrova 6–4, 6–4. Amélie Mauresmo beats Martina Hingis 3–6, 6–1, 6–4 and still has the opportunity to claim the second semi final spot.
  - Red Group: Kim Clijsters recovers from her loss versus Maria Sharapova by beating Svetlana Kuznetsova 6–1, 6–1. 10 November's matches will decide who qualifies for the semi-finals.
- 2006 South American Games:
  - Medals awarded in 8 classes of the judo competition.

== 8 November 2006 (Wednesday) ==
- Major League Baseball: The San Diego Padres named Bud Black, former pitching coach for the Los Angeles Angels as their new manager, then traded rookie second baseman Josh Barfield to the Cleveland Indians for two minor leaguers.
- Billiards:
  - Single World Masters winner and two time European Champion Alex Lely retires at the age of 32 after being knocked out at the 2006 WPA Men's World Nine-ball Championship's group stages.
- Figure skating:
  - Irina Slutskaya denies the reports of her retirement in the sport and says she will probably compete during the 2006–07 season.
- Football (soccer):
  - Al-Karama wins the second leg of the 2006 AFC Champions League final versus Jeonbuk Hyundai Motors 2–1. Jeonbuk however, claims the Champions League title 3–2 on aggregate after winning the first leg 2–0.
  - Former English international Paul Gascoigne has been arrested and is accused of molesting a photographer at a night club.
  - S.C. Braga fires their manager Carlos Carvalhal after their 3–0 loss versus F.C. Porto on November 6.
- Ice hockey:
  - Amstel Tijgers wins the Dutch Challenge Cup after beating Destil Trappers 2–1 in the final in Amsterdam.
- Motorsport:
  - Sete Gibernau who finished in second position in the MotoGP World Championships twice behind Valentino Rossi retires from the sport. He won nine MotoGP races during his career.
- Tennis: 2006 WTA Tour Championships, Madrid:
  - Yellow Group: Nadia Petrova fails to win her second match versus Martina Hingis. The Swiss won by 6–4, 3–6, 6–3.
  - Red Group: Maria Sharapova beats Kim Clijsters 6–4, 6–4 to win her second match of the championships and is leading with 4 points. Svetlana Kuznetsova wins het first match of the tournament 7–5, 6–3 versus Elena Dementieva leaving her without any points after two matches.
- Sailing: ISAF World Sailor of the Year Awards:
  - The ISAF announces Mike Sanderson of New Zealand and Paige Railey of the United States as the 2006 award winners. Sanderson won the Volvo Ocean Race with his ABN Amro I boat, while Railey won the Laser Radial World Championships.

== 7 November 2006 (Tuesday) ==
- American football: Bryan Pata, a defensive end for Miami (Florida), is shot and killed shortly after leaving practice. (ABC News America)
- Cycling:
  - UCI Pro Tour team Davitamon–Lotto will experience a name change, to Predictor–Lotto for the 2007 season. Omega–Pharma will continue to sponsor the team, but will use it to promote its pregnancy test kits instead of its vitamin range.
- Football (soccer):
  - General news:
    - Thomas Caers resigns as the manager of Sint-Truiden after only winning seven point in 11 games. However, he remains at the club in another position.
    - Beira Mar manager Augusto Inácio changes his job to take the vacant position at Ionikos.
  - 2006 Women's African Football Championship: Semi finals:
    - Nigeria 5–0 Cameroon
    - Ghana 1–0 South Africa
  - Carling Cup: Defending holders Manchester United is stunned at Southend United 1–0 in a round of sixteen match.
- Equestrian:
  - Dressage: Dutch two time silver Olympic medallist Tineke Bartels is heavily injured after she fell off her horse during a training. She fell with her head against a tree and will need a long time to recover. It is unsure whether she can continue her career.
  - Horse Racing: Japanese horses Delta Blues and Pop Rock finish first and second in the 2006 Melbourne Cup. Maybe Better, an Australian horse, finishes third.
- Tennis: 2006 WTA Tour Championships, Madrid:
  - Yellow Group: Nadia Petrova beats World's no.1 Amélie Mauresmo 6–2, 6–2 in her opening match, while Justine Henin-Hardenne recovers after losing the second set to Martina Hingis: 6–2, 6–7, 6–1.
  - Red Group: Maria Sharapova clinches an easy 6–1, 6–4 victory over fellow Russian Elena Dementieva to win her first points in the Championships.

== 6 November 2006 (Monday) ==
- Major League Baseball: Oakland Athletics coach Ron Washington is named manager of the Texas Rangers.
- Figure skating:
  - Irina Slutskaya ends her international career at the age of 27. She won two World and seven European titles, while she won a silver and a bronze medal at the Winter Olympics.
- NFL Monday Night Football: Seattle Seahawks 16, Oakland Raiders 0: The Raiders give up nine sacks, punt 10 times and only run one play inside Seattle's 30-yard line as they are shut out on Monday Night Football for the second time this year.
- Football (soccer):
  - Ronaldinho is named FIFPro World Player of the Year for the second time in two editions. The players named in the World XI are: Goalkeeper: Gianluigi Buffon; Defenders: Lilian Thuram, Gianluca Zambrotta, John Terry, Fabio Cannavaro; Midfielders: Andrea Pirlo, Zinedine Zidane, Kaká; Forwards: Samuel Eto'o, Thierry Henry and Ronaldinho.
- Golf: Ryder Cup:
  - Paul Azinger will be the new captain of the American Ryder Cup team, replacing Tom Lehman who was their captain in the 2006 edition which was won by Europe 18.5 vs. 9.5. In addition, the PGA of America announces a major overhaul in the points system to select the U.S. team, beginning with the 2008 Ryder Cup at the Valhalla Golf Club in Kentucky, and that the top eight will earn spots onto the team, with four captain's picks instead of just two.

== 5 November 2006 (Sunday) ==
- Cricket: 2006 ICC Champions Trophy:
  - Australia defeats West Indies by eight wickets at the Brabourne Stadium in Mumbai, India to win the Champions Trophy for the first time. West Indies were 65 for one in the eighth over, but Nathan Bracken took three wickets, and only Dwayne Bravo of the middle order batsmen passed 10 (21 off 47 balls). West Indies were bowled out for 138, Glenn McGrath and Shane Watson also taking two wickets each, before West Indies took two wickets in the first four overs. Shane Watson and Damien Martyn batted through without loss, however, only interrupted by the rain delay which also reduced Australia's target to 116 under the Duckworth–Lewis method. (Cricinfo)
- Road running: Brazilian Marílson Gomes dos Santos (2:09:58) becomes the first South American ever to win the New York City Marathon. Jeļena Prokopčuka of Latvia wins on the female side for the second consecutive year in a time of 2:25:05. Lance Armstrong, the seven-time Tour de France champion who was running with fellow cancer survivors, finishes in 2:59:37 in his first marathon.(Bloomberg)
- NFL Week 9:
  - Detroit Lions 30, Atlanta Falcons 14: Jon Kitna, who runs up 321 passing yards, breaks the game open with a 60-yard touchdown pass to Roy Williams in the fourth quarter.
  - Baltimore Ravens 26, Cincinnati Bengals 20: The Bengals turn the ball over twice on their first three offensive plays, giving the Ravens a 14–0 lead Baltimore holds on to.
  - Washington Redskins 22, Dallas Cowboys 19: On what would have been the last play of the game, the Redskins block a Mike Vanderjagt field-goal attempt. A Dallas penalty on the return gives the 'Skins an untimed down, which Nick Novak uses to kick a 47-yard field goal.
  - Buffalo Bills 24, Green Bay Packers 10: The Bills complete only eight passes, but one of them is a 43-yard touchdown from J. P. Losman to Lee Evans that gives Buffalo a late lead. A Ko Simpson end-zone interception ends the Packers' comeback attempt.
  - New York Giants 14, Houston Texans 10: Eli Manning's three-yard touchdown pass to Jeremy Shockey puts the Giants up in the fourth quarter. Corey Webster's recovery of a Jameel Cook fumble allows New York to run out the clock.
  - Kansas City Chiefs 31, St. Louis Rams 17: Larry Johnson rushes for 174 yards, and Damon Huard throws for three touchdowns.
  - Miami Dolphins 31, Chicago Bears 13: The Bears commit six turnovers, four of which led to Miami touchdowns, and fall from the ranks of the unbeaten. Making matters worse, Bears middle linebacker Brian Urlacher injured his foot in the fourth quarter.
  - New Orleans Saints 31, Tampa Bay Buccaneers 14: Drew Brees goes 24-for-32 for 314 yards and three touchdowns.
  - Jacksonville Jaguars 37, Tennessee Titans 7: David Garrard throws three touchdown passes, while Vince Young throws three interceptions.
  - San Francisco 49ers 9, Minnesota Vikings 3: No touchdowns were scored as all scoring was done by field goals (three for San Francisco, one for the Vikings).
  - San Diego Chargers 32, Cleveland Browns 25: LaDainian Tomlinson runs for 172 yards and three second-half touchdowns; Phil Dawson sets a Browns record with six field goals.
  - Denver Broncos 31, Pittsburgh Steelers 20: Four of Pittsburgh's six turnovers come in Denver's red zone; Javon Walker has 206 yards from scrimmage and three touchdowns.
  - Indianapolis Colts 27, New England Patriots 20: For the second straight year, the Colts march into Foxborough and win, thanks in part to four Tom Brady interceptions.

Bye Week: Arizona Cardinals, Carolina Panthers, New York Jets, Philadelphia Eagles.

- 2006 CFL Playoffs Divisional Semi-Finals:
  - East Division: Toronto Argonauts 31, Winnipeg Blue Bombers 27. Michael Bishop, replacing Damon Allen as Argos quarterback due to injury, passes for two fourth-quarter touchdowns in the Argos' win, earning a trip to Montreal next week against the Montreal Alouettes.
  - West Division: Saskatchewan Roughriders 30, Calgary Stampeders 21. The Stamps are cancelled by the Roughriders at home, while Saskatchewan heads to Vancouver next week and a date with the Lions.
- Figure skating: Skate Canada International, Victoria, British Columbia:
  - Ice dancing: (gold) (Canada) Marie-France Dubreuil / Patrice Lauzon, (silver) (Canada) Tessa Virtue / Scott Moir, (bronze) (Italy) Federica Faiella / Massimo Scali
- Football (soccer):
  - 2006 MLS Cup Conference Finals:
    - East: D.C. United 0–1 New England Revolution. Taylor Twellman's fourth-minute goal was all that the Revs needed to advance to the Finals thanks to Matt Reis's clean sheet.
    - West: Houston Dynamo 3–1 Colorado Rapids. The former San José Earthquakes franchise earned their third trip to the MLS Cup Finals by handling the fourth-seeded Rapids rather easily in their first season in Houston.
  - IF Elfsborg wins their first Swedish title in 45 years by winning the Allsvenskan. They secured their title thanks to a 1–0 victory over defending champions Djurgårdens IF. In the final rankings Elfsborg finished 1 point on top of AIK.
- Rugby union: New Zealand defeat England 41 points to 20 in a one-off international as part of a number of internationals being played throughout November. The game marked the opening of the new South Stand at Twickenham Stadium, allowing 82,000 fans to see the game.
- Auto racing: Chase for the NEXTEL Cup: Dickies 500 at Texas Motor Speedway
  - (1) Tony Stewart (2) Jimmie Johnson (3) Kevin Harvick. In a green-white-checkers finish, Stewart wins his second straight race and third outside the Chase while Johnson takes the points lead from Matt Kenseth. Terry Labonte drove in his final race in the state where he was born, finishing 36th.

== 4 November 2006 (Saturday) ==
- Cricket: Umpire Darrell Hair is banned from officiating in international matches by the International Cricket Council.
- College football, AP NCAA Division I-A Top 25:
  - (1) Ohio State 17, Illinois 10. The Buckeyes take a 17–0 halftime lead, then hold off the Illini who get a fourth quarter rally before falling short.
  - (2) Michigan 34, Ball State 26. The Cardinals give the Wolverines all they could handle.
  - (4) Texas 36, Oklahoma State 10
  - (6) Auburn 27, Arkansas State 0
  - (7) Florida 25, Vanderbilt 19. The Gators, up 25–6 going into the fourth quarter, survive a furious Commodores rally, and clinch the East Division title and a berth in the SEC Championship Game.
  - (13) LSU 28, (8) Tennessee 24. Quarterback JaMarcus Russell leads LSU on an 80-yard game-winning drive that ends in a touchdown catch by Early Doucet.
  - (9) Southern California 42, Stanford 0
  - (10) Cal 38, UCLA 24
  - (11) Notre Dame 45, North Carolina 26
  - (12) Arkansas 26, South Carolina 20
  - (22) Wake Forest 21, (16) Boston College 14. Wake goes to 8–1 for the first time since 1944.
  - (17) Wisconsin 13, Penn State 3. Legendary Penn State head coach Joe Paterno suffers a knee injury when one of his players runs into him.
  - (18) Oklahoma 17, (21) Texas A&M 16
  - Maryland 13, (19) Clemson 12. The Terps shock the Tigers in "Death Valley".
  - (20) Georgia Tech 31, NC State 23
  - (23) Virginia Tech 17, Miami (Florida) 10
  - (24) Oregon 34, Washington 14
  - Arizona 27, (25) Washington State 17
- In other significant games:
  - Mississippi State 34, Alabama 26. Bulldogs coach Sylvester Croom upsets his alma mater at Bryant–Denny Stadium, snapping a 23-game SEC road losing streak.
  - Kentucky 24, Georgia 20. For the first season since 1973, the Dawgs lose to both Vanderbilt and Kentucky, the traditional bottom pair in the SEC East Division.
  - Hawaiʻi 63, Utah State 10. The Warriors will be the host team for the fourth time in the five-year history in the Sheraton Hawaiʻi Bowl after defeating the Aggies, and accepting a bid to the Christmas Eve classic, becoming the first team to accept a bowl bid.
- Cycling:
  - Erik Dekker finishes third in the last race of his career. The 36-year-old Dutchman was beaten in the sprint of the Amstel Curaçao Race by Alejandro Valverde and Fränk Schleck.
- Figure skating: Skate Canada International, Victoria, British Columbia:
  - (m): (gold) (Switzerland) Stéphane Lambiel, (silver) (Japan) Daisuke Takahashi, (bronze) (United States) Johnny Weir
  - (w): (gold) (Canada) Joannie Rochette, (silver) (Japan) Fumie Suguri, (bronze) (South Korea) Yuna Kim
- Football (soccer):
  - 2006–07 UEFA Women's Cup, Semi finals, first leg:
    - Kolbotn 1 – 5 Umeå IK
    - Brøndby IF 2 – 2 Arsenal LFC
  - 2006 Peace Queen Cup, final:
    - United States 1 – 0 Canada
- Gymnastics:
  - The Fédération Internationale de Gymnastique awards the 2010 World Artistic Gymnastics Championships to Rotterdam in The Netherlands. It will be the second time the championships will be held in Rotterdam, with the first time being in 1987.
- Horse racing: 2006 Breeders Cup World Championship at Louisville, Kentucky
  - Invasor, an Argentine-bred now running in the US, stuns the two favorites, Bernardini and Lava Man, to win the $5 million (US) Classic. Fernando Jara, who rode Invasor to the win, became the youngest jockey to win any Breeders' Cup race. Other winners in horse racing's richest day ($20 million [US] in purses):
    - Juvenile Fillies – Dreaming of Anna
    - Juvenile – Street Scene
    - Filly & Mare Turf – Ouija Board
      - Ouija Board, who won this race in 2004, joins Da Hoss as the only horses to win Breeders' Cup races in non-consecutive years.
    - Sprint – Thor's Echo
    - Mile – Miesque's Approval
    - Distaff – Round Pond
      - Tragically, Pine Island was put down following the race after severely dislocating her left front ankle, which broke through the skin and left her prone to untreatable infection. A second entrant, Fleet Indian, also broke down, but her injury was less severe, and she is expected to survive.
    - Turf – Red Rocks
- Rugby league: 2006 Rugby League Tri-Nations:
  - (United Kingdom) Great Britain beats Australia by 23–12 in the Sydney Football Stadium in Sydney.
- Rugby union: Wales and Australia draw 29-all in a one-off international as part of a number of Test matches taking place in the Northern Hemisphere during November. The game, played at Millennium Stadium in Cardiff, is historic as it is the first draw ever between the nations.

== 3 November 2006 (Friday) ==
- Major League Baseball: The winners of the 2006 National League Gold Glove Awards:
  - Catcher – Brad Ausmus, Houston Astros.
  - 1st base – Albert Pujols, St. Louis Cardinals.
  - 2nd base – Orlando Hudson, Arizona Diamondbacks.
  - Shortstop – Omar Vizquel, San Francisco Giants.
  - 3rd base – Scott Rolen, St. Louis Cardinals.
  - Outfield – Andruw Jones, Atlanta Braves; Carlos Beltrán, New York Mets; Mike Cameron, San Diego Padres.
  - Pitcher – Greg Maddux, Chicago Cubs/Los Angeles Dodgers. (Maddux's 16th award, tying him with Brooks Robinson and Jim Kaat for the most all-time.)
- Figure skating: Skate Canada International, Victoria, British Columbia:
  - Pairs: (gold) (China) Zhang Dan / Zhang Hao, (silver) (United States) Rena Inoue / John Baldwin, (bronze) (Canada) Valérie Marcoux / Craig Buntin
- Football: General news:
  - Blaž Slišković has been fired as manager of the Bosnia and Herzegovina national football team. In September 2006 he already resigned from the job, but the national football association asked him to return.
- Speed skating:
  - Two-time Olympic gold medallist Gianni Romme announces his immediate retirement in long track speed skating.

== 2 November 2006 (Thursday) ==
- Football: 2006–07 UEFA Cup Matchday 2
  - Group A: Partizan Belgrade 1–1 Livorno
  - Group A: Rangers 2–0 Maccabi Haifa
  - Group B: Dinamo Bucharest 2–1 Beşiktaş
  - Group B: Tottenham Hotspur 3–1 Club Brugge
  - Group C: Grasshoppers 2–5 AZ Alkmaar
  - Group C: Braga 4–0 Slovan Liberec
  - Group D: Heerenveen 0–2 Odense
  - Group D: Lens 3–1 Osasuna
  - Group E: Blackburn Rovers 3–0 FC Basel
  - Group E: Nancy 2–1 Wisła Kraków
  - Group F: Ajax 3–0 Austria Vienna
  - Group F: Zulte-Waregem 3–1 Sparta Prague
  - Group G: Hapoel Tel Aviv 2–2 Rapid Bucharest
  - Group G: Mladá Boleslav 0–1 Panathinaikos
  - Group H: Celta Vigo 1–1 Eintracht Frankfurt
  - Group H: Palermo 0–1 Newcastle United
- General news:
  - Jan Kocian takes charge of the Slovakia national football team to replace Dusan Galis, who resigned from the job. Kocian comes from Sportfreunde Siegen.
- College football, AP NCAA Division I-A Top 25:
  - (5) Louisville 44, (3) West Virginia 34. The Mountaineers lose the ball three times on fumbles, and fall to the Cardinals. Next for Louisville, a trip to the other remaining Big East unbeaten, Rutgers a week from now.
- NBA Opening Week games:
  - San Antonio Spurs 97, Dallas Mavericks, 91. In a rematch of their 2006 Western Conference Final matchup, the Mavs lead for much of the game, but go scoreless for six minutes early in the fourth quarter and never recover, despite 21 points and 11 rebounds from Dirk Nowitzki. Tony Parker leads the Spurs with 19 points.
  - Los Angeles Clippers 96, Denver Nuggets 95. Sam Cassell dropped 35 points to lead the Clips to victory in their home opener.
- Rugby league: Rugby League Tri-Nations
  - New Zealand is stripped of 2 competition points after the Rugby League International Federation deems Nathan Fien was ineligible to represent New Zealand during the Kiwis match against Great Britain. Fien was banned from taking any further part in the competition. (TVNZ)
- Cricket: 2006 ICC Champions Trophy, 2nd semi-final:
  - Chris Gayle made the highest score of the tournament thus far, batting through 44 overs unbeaten as West Indies (262/4) beat South Africa (258/8) with six wickets and six overs to spare to book their place in the final, a replay of the main round group match, which West Indies won. Gayle batted together with Shivnarine Chanderpaul for the first 26 overs, adding 154 runs before Chanderpaul retired hurt, and South Africa did get some wickets near the end. Earlier, Herschelle Gibbs and Abraham de Villiers put on 92 for South Africa's fourth wicket, after they were 96 for three in the 23rd over. (Cricinfo)
- Major League Baseball: The winners of the 2006 American League Gold Glove Awards:
  - Catcher – Iván Rodríguez, Detroit Tigers.
  - 1st Base – Mark Teixeira, Texas Rangers.
  - 2nd Base – Mark Grudzielanek, Kansas City Royals.
  - Shortstop – Derek Jeter, New York Yankees.
  - 3rd Base – Eric Chavez, Oakland Athletics.
  - Outfield – Torii Hunter, Minnesota Twins; Vernon Wells, Toronto Blue Jays; Ichiro, Seattle Mariners.
  - Pitcher – Kenny Rogers, Detroit Tigers.

== 1 November 2006 (Wednesday) ==
- NBA Opening Week Games:
  - Philadelphia 76ers 88, Atlanta Hawks 75. Allen Iverson scores 32 to lead the Sixers.
  - Indiana Pacers 106, Charlotte Bobcats 99. Jermaine O'Neal and Šarūnas Jasikevičius score 20 each for the Pacers, spoiling the debut of Adam Morrison as a player and Michael Jordan as Charlotte's head of basketball operations.
  - Orlando Magic 109, Chicago Bulls 94. Dwight Howard's 27 points and 11 rebounds lead the Magic to a win.
  - New Orleans/Oklahoma City Hornets 91, Boston Celtics 87. Following a pregame tribute to recently deceased Celtics legend Red Auerbach, Chris Paul has 20 points and 10 assists to lead the Hornets to the road win. Paul Pierce has 29 points and 19 rebounds in a losing effort.
  - New Jersey Nets 102, Toronto Raptors 92. The Nets win behind Jason Kidd's 76th career triple-double (14 points, 10 rebounds, 10 assists) and Vince Carter's 25 points and 11 rebounds.
  - Milwaukee Bucks 105, Detroit Pistons 97: The Bucks take full advantage of the offseason departure of Ben Wallace, scoring 70 points in the paint against the Pistons. Michael Redd leads the winners with 37 points.
  - Cleveland Cavaliers 97, Washington Wizards 94. Antawn Jamison missed a potential game-tying three-pointer near the buzzer, Larry Hughes and LeBron James score 27 and 26 respectively to lead the Cavs to the win.
  - New York Knicks 118, Memphis Grizzlies 117 (3 OT). The Knicks blow a 19-point fourth-quarter lead, but survive to give Isiah Thomas a win in his coaching debut.
  - Minnesota Timberwolves 92, Sacramento Kings 83. The Kings take a lead into the fourth quarter, but Mike Bibby is ejected after drawing two technicals and the Kings turn the ball over 12 times in the final period. Kevin Garnett has 24 points and 12 rebounds for the winners.
  - Utah Jazz 107, Houston Rockets 97. Double-doubles from Carlos Boozer (24 points, 19 rebounds) and Deron Williams (18 points, 10 assists) plus clutch play down the stretch from Derek Fisher lead the Jazz.
  - Portland Trail Blazers 110, Seattle SuperSonics 106. Zach Randolph scores 30, and Brandon Roy scores 20 in his NBA debut (in his hometown of Seattle) to lead the Blazers, who end a 16-game losing streak. Luke Ridnour has 22 points and 13 assists in a losing effort.
  - Phoenix Suns 112, Los Angeles Clippers 104. Double-doubles from Shawn Marion (27 points, 10 rebounds) and Steve Nash (20 points, 11 assists), plus 15 points off the bench from Amar'e Stoudemire help the Suns win.
  - Los Angeles Lakers 99, Golden State Warriors 98. Ronny Turiaf has career highs in both points (23) and rebounds (9), and Lamar Odom adds 22 points, 9 rebounds, and 9 assists to lead the Lakers to their second win without the injured Kobe Bryant.
- Football: 2006–07 UEFA Champions League Matchday 4
  - Group E: Lyon 1–0 Dynamo Kyiv
  - Group E: Real Madrid 1–0 Steaua Bucharest
  - Group F: Benfica 3–0 Celtic
  - Group F: København 1–0 Manchester United
  - Group G: Arsenal 0–0 CSKA Moscow
  - Group G: Hamburg 1–3 Porto
  - Group H: AEK Athens 1–0 Lille
  - Group H: A.C. Milan 4–1 Anderlecht
- College football, AP NCAA Division I-A Top 25:
  - (14) Boise State 45, Fresno State 21
- Cricket:
  - The Pakistan Cricket Board finds fast bowlers Shoaib Akhtar and Mohammad Asif guilty of using the banned anabolic steroid nandrolone following a positive test at the end of September. Asif is banned from playing first-class cricket for one year; Akhtar is slapped with a two-year ban. (Cricinfo article)
  - 2006 Champions Trophy, semi-finals:
    - Daniel Vettori, New Zealand's No. 8, top-scores with 79 in the match, but New Zealand (206) are still beaten by Australia (240/9) in the first semi-final at Mohali, Chandigarh. Earlier, Kyle Mills took four for 38 including both openers, while Ricky Ponting and Andrew Symonds both made 58 for Australia. New Zealand were at 35 for six, Glenn McGrath taking three and Nathan Bracken two wickets, when Vettori came in to bat, but he shared a century stand with Jacob Oram that lasted for more than 20 overs. With 15 overs remaining, New Zealand required 103 with four wickets in hand, but Oram was dismissed next ball and New Zealand bowled out with four overs remaining. (Cricinfo)
