= List of nations in qualification for the 2007 Rugby World Cup =

94 nations participated in qualifying for the 2007 Rugby World Cup. The 86 teams taking part in regional qualifiers together with the 8 teams which have qualified automatically brings to 94 the total number of teams participating in the 2007 Rugby World Cup.

== Africa ==
(15 teams, 2.25 places)

- Botswana - (Failed to advance past Africa, Round 1a)
- Cameroon - (Failed to advance past Africa, Round 1a)
- Ivory Coast - (Failed to advance past Africa, Round 2)
- Kenya - (Failed to advance past Africa, Round 2)
- Madagascar - (Failed to advance past Africa, Round 1b)
- Morocco - (Failed to advance past Repechage 1, Round 1)
- Namibia - (Qualified as Africa 1)
- Nigeria - (Failed to advance past Africa, Round 1a)
- Senegal - (Failed to advance past Africa, Round 1b)
- South Africa - (Automatic qualifier)
- Eswatini - (Failed to advance past Africa, Round 1a)
- Tunisia - (Failed to advance past Africa, Round 2)
- Uganda - (Failed to advance past Africa, Round 2)
- Zambia - (Failed to advance past Africa, Round 1a Playoff)
- Zimbabwe - (Failed to advance past Africa, Round 1b Playoff)

== Americas ==
(19 teams, 3.5 places)

- Argentina - (Qualified as Americas 1)
- Bahamas - (Failed to advance past Americas, Round 1a)
- Barbados - (Failed to advance past Americas, Round 3b)
- Bermuda - (Failed to advance past Americas, Round 1a)
- Brazil - (Failed to advance past Americas, Round 2)
- Canada - (Qualified as Americas 2)
- Cayman Islands - (Failed to advance past Americas, Round 1a)
- Chile - (Failed to advance past Americas, Round 3a)
- Colombia - (Failed to advance past Americas, Round 1b)
- Guyana - (Failed to advance past Americas, Round 1a)
- Jamaica - (Failed to advance past Americas, Round 1a)
- Paraguay - (Failed to advance past Americas, Round 2)
- Peru - (Failed to advance past Americas, Round 1b)
- Saint Lucia - (Failed to advance past Americas, Round 1a)
- Saint Vincent and the Grenadines - (Failed to qualify for Americas, Round 1a)
- Trinidad and Tobago - (Failed to advance past Americas, Round 1a)
- United States - (Qualified as Americas 3)
- Uruguay - (Failed to advance past Repechage 1, Round 2)
- Venezuela - (Failed to advance past Americas, Round 1b)

== Asia ==
(13 teams, 1.5 places)

- Arabian Gulf rugby union team - (Failed to advance beyond Asia, Round 2)
- China - (Failed to advance beyond Asia, Round 1a)
- Chinese Taipei - (Failed to advance beyond Asia, Round 1a)
- Guam - (Failed to advance beyond Asia, Round 1a)
- Hong Kong - (Failed to advance beyond Asia, Round 3)
- India - (Failed to advance beyond Asia, Round 1a)
- Japan - (Qualified as Asia 1)
- South Korea - (Failed to advance beyond Repechage 2)
- Kazakhstan - (Failed to advance beyond Asia, Round 1b)
- Malaysia - (Failed to advance beyond Asia, Round 1a)
- Singapore - (Failed to advance beyond Asia, Round 1a)
- Sri Lanka - (Failed to advance beyond Asia, Round 2)
- Thailand - (Failed to advance beyond Asia, Round 1a)

== Europe ==
(36 teams, 8.25 places)

- Andorra - (Failed to advance past Europe, Round 3)
- Austria - (Failed to advance past Europe, Round 2)
- Belgium - (Failed to advance past Europe, Round 3)
- Bosnia and Herzegovina - (Failed to advance past Europe, Round 1)
- Bulgaria - (Failed to advance past Europe, Round 2)
- Croatia - (Failed to advance past Europe, Round 3)
- Czech Republic - (Failed to advance past Europe, Round 4)
- Denmark - (Failed to advance past Europe, Round 2 Playoff)
- England - (Automatic qualifier and champions)
- Finland - (Failed to advance past Europe, Round 1)
- France - (Automatic qualifier and host)
- Germany - (Failed to advance past Europe, Round 3 Playoff)
- Georgia - (Qualified as Europe 3)
- Hungary - (Failed to advance past Europe, Round 2)
- Ireland - (Automatic qualifier)
- Israel - (Failed to advance past Europe, Round 1)
- Italy - (Qualified as Europe 1)
- Latvia - (Failed to advance past Europe, Round 2)
- Lithuania - (Failed to advance past Europe, Round 2)
- Luxembourg - (Failed to advance past Europe, Round 2)
- Malta - (Failed to advance past Europe, Round 3)
- Moldova - (Failed to advance past Europe, Round 3)
- Netherlands - (Failed to advance past Europe, Round 3)
- Norway - (Failed to advance past Europe, Round 1)
- Poland - (Failed to advance past Europe, Round 3)
- Portugal - (Qualified as Repechage 1)
- Romania - (Qualified as Europe 2)
- Russia - (Failed to advance past Europe, Round 5)
- Scotland - (Automatic qualifier)
- Serbia and Montenegro - (Failed to advance past Europe, Round 3)
- Slovenia - (Failed to advance past Europe, Round 2)
- Spain - (Failed to advance past Europe, Round 5)
- Sweden - (Failed to advance past Europe, Round 2 Playoff)
- Switzerland - (Failed to advance past Europe, Round 2)
- Ukraine - (Failed to advance past Europe, Round 4)
- Wales - (Automatic qualifier)

== Oceania ==
(11 teams, 4.5 places)

- Australia - (Automatic qualifier)
- Cook Islands - (Failed to advance beyond Oceania, Round 4)
- Fiji - (Qualified as Oceania 2)
- Papua New Guinea - (Failed to advance beyond Oceania, Round 2)
- New Zealand - (Automatic qualifier)
- Niue - (Failed to advance beyond Oceania, Round 1a)
- Samoa - (Qualified as Oceania 1)
- Solomon Islands - (Failed to advance beyond Oceania, Round 1a)
- Tahiti - (Failed to advance beyond Oceania, Round 1a)
- Tonga - (Qualified as Repechage 2)
- Vanuatu - (Failed to advance beyond Oceania, Round 1a)

== See also ==
- Rugby World Cup
- 2007 Rugby World Cup
- 2007 Rugby World Cup qualifying
