= Lisa John =

English ten-pin bowler

Lisa John (born 14 August 1981) is an English ten-pin bowler.

A resident of Worthing, West Sussex, John has been bowling since 1990. Currently ranked number 6 in the UK, John has been a National Team member from 1997 to 2003, but has been out of the National Team for personal reasons and injury.

John was selected to play for England under 18s every year from 1993 to 1999, and was the Junior Nationals champion in 1993, 1994, 1995, 1997 and 1998.

She was voted Most Promising Newcomer to Adult Tournaments in 1997, Junior Bowler of the Year 1997 and 1998 and in 1998 was voted Young Bowler of the Year by National Bowling Magazine.

In the European Youth Championships held in Vienna, Austria, in 1998, John won bronze in the doubles and silver in the team event.

In Moscow, Russia, in 1998, John became the World Youth Games champion and in the European Youth Team Cup in Brussels, Belgium, in 1999 won the gold medal.

At the World Youth Championships 2000 held in Santo Domingo, Dominican Republic, John was doubles champion and at the World Youth Championships held in Pattaya, Thailand, in 2002, was part of the champion team.

John was 4th in the British Open in 1996, the All Events winner at the BTBA Nationals in 1997, the Highest Placed British Lady in the British Open 1998, the AMF Sheffield Singles Champion 1998 and 1999, the AMF Scott Banks Memorial Ladies Winner 1999 and 2nd in 2000, and took the AMF Wolves Doubles 1st 1999.

At the World Championships held in 1999 in the UAE, she was placed 5th in doubles and 12th in All-Events.

She became the BTBA Nationals Ladies Team Champions 2001, and the Irish Open Champion the same year. At the European Championships held that year in Aalborg, Denmark, she was doubles champion, trios champion, took a team bronze, an individual bronze (based on accumulative score from all events) and set new European records in doubles and trios.

She continued her success by taking the European Cup for Individuals in Moscow, Russia; and being the Highest Placed British Lady, British Open.

She took Bronze in the European Team Cup in 2002 in Essen, Germany; and 4th position at the Sinai International Open [2002 in Cairo, Egypt. The same year, she was AMF Portsmouth Singles Winner 2002, AMF Wellingborough Doubles Winner 2002, 3rd in the British Open, and took European Cup for Individuals at Schiedam, The Netherlands.

She continued her success in 2003, becoming Irish Open runner-up, Scott Banks Memorial trios singles winner, Under 24 British Open champion, Portsmouth Singles winner, and receiving silver at the World Championships in Malaysia.

In 2005, she was BTBA Nationals doubles and team champion.

At the UK Championships in 2006, she was a runner-up; the same year, she was a World Cup qualification winner and World Cup runner-up at Caracas, Venezuela.

In 2007, she was BTBA Nationals doubles & team champion and All-Events runner-up and Jim Brewer Memorial champion 2007. She will be representing England at the Women’s World Championships in Mexico 1 – 8 September 2007.

== Sources ==
- Arun Business Partnership. Lisa John, England’s Number 1 Female Tenpin Bowler
- bowlingdigital.com. Lisa John leads women into top 24 in 42nd QubicaAMF Bowling World Cup. 11 August 2006
