= 2007 Rugby World Cup qualifying =

Tournament details
- Dates: 2003 – 2007
- No. of nations: 94

There were 20 places available for the 2007 Rugby World Cup held in France. The 86 teams taking part in regional qualifying competitions together with the 8 teams which have qualified automatically brings to 94 the total number of teams participating in the 2007 Rugby World Cup.

== Qualified teams ==
Africa	Americas	Asia	Europe	Oceania
Namibia (Africa 1); South Africa	Argentina (Americas 1); Canada (Americas 2); United States (Americas 3)	Japan (Asia 1)	England (holders); France (hosts); Ireland; Italy (Europe 1); Romania (Europe 2); Scotland; Georgia (Europe 3); Portugal (repechage 1); Wales	Australia; Fiji (Oceania 2); New Zealand; Samoa (Oceania 1); Tonga (repechage 2)

== Tournaments ==
- Africa qualification
- Americas qualification
- Asia qualification
- European qualification
- Oceania qualification
- Repechage

== Regional qualifiers ==
=== Africa ===
- Namibia (Africa 1)

=== Americas ===
- Argentina (Americas 1)
- Canada (Americas 2)
- United States (Americas 3)

=== Asia ===
- Japan (Asia 1)

=== Europe ===
- Italy (Europe 1)
- Romania (Europe 2)
- Georgia (Europe 3)
- Portugal (Repechage 1)

=== Oceania ===
- Samoa (Oceania 1)
- Fiji (Oceania 2)
- Tonga (Repechage 2)

== 2007 qualifying tournaments ==
=== Qualifying places ===
The places for the 2007 World Cup were outlined as:

- Africa 1
- Americas 1
- Americas 2
- Americas 3
- Asia 1
- Europe 1
- Europe 2
- Europe 3
- Oceania 1
- Oceania 2
- Repechage 1
- Repechage 2

=== Africa ===
There is one place available for African teams, and one place in the repechage. In the group rounds, there are three points awarded for a win, two for a draw, and one for a loss. Games are played on a home and away basis. There are no bonus points awarded. The African qualification is broken up into three rounds; Round 1, Round 2 and Round 3. The first phase of the tournament is Round 1a, where two groups of three teams play each other. The respective winners of the two groups play each other for a place in Round 1b. Round 1b consists again of two groups of three teams; the winner of both pools will enter Round 2. The runners-up of both pools play each other to enter Round 2 with the winners. Round 2 also consists of two groups of three teams, with the winners of each group qualifying for Round 3. Round 3 is a to game series between the respective group winners from Round 2. The winner qualifies for the World Cup, and the loser will enter a Repechage round.

=== Americas ===
There are three available places in the World Cup for Americas nations via qualification, as well as a potential fourth qualifier in the form of a Repechage. The Americas qualification tournament is broken up into four rounds; Round 1, Round 2, Round 3 and Round 4. The first phase, Round 1a, is a competition for entry to Round 3b. It is contested between two pools of four Caribbean nations – with the pool winners playing in a playoff to reach round 3b. Round 1b is a group of four CONSUR 2nd Division nations – the winner progresses to Round 2. Round 2 is a three nation competition with the winner moving to Round 3a. The winner of the Round 3a competition of three nations progresses directly to the World Cup as Americas 1. The runner-up progresses to Round 4. The winner of the Round 3b competition of three nations progresses directly to the World Cup as Americas 2. The runner-up progresses to Round 4. Round 4 is a to match play-off consisting of the runners-up of each Round 3 tournaments. The winner progresses directly to the World Cup as Americas 3. The runner up progresses to Repechage round as Americas 4, to meet the winner of Africa 2 v Europe 4, for the first Repechage place in the World Cup.

=== Asia ===
The Asia qualification process is broken up into three rounds – Round 1, Round 2 and Round 3. There is one place for an Asia team in the World Cup, with a second potential place in the form of a Repechage. Three teams in Division 1 of Round 1a play each other once. All three teams go through to Round 2, the winner and runner up into Division 1 of Round 2 with third place into Division 2 of Round 2. Division 2 of Round 1a sees another three teams play each other once, the top two teams go through to Round 2, the winner entering Division 1 of Round 2and the runner up Division 2 of Round 2. Round 2 is broken up into two divisions of three nations, each nation plays each other once. The top two teams from Division 1 and top team from Division 2 go through to round 3. The winner of Round 3 will qualify directly to the World Cup as Asia 1. The runner-up will advance to the Repechage round as Asia 2, to play Oceania 3 for Repechage 2.

=== Europe ===
There are three places available for European teams, and one place in the repechage. The teams are 'ranked' according to their division in the European Nations Cup, taking into account the relegations and promotions at the end of the previous competition. The format is broken up into six rounds. Round 2 sees 20 nations broken up into four pools of five teams – each playing each other twice. The top two ranked nations of each pool will gain entry to Round 3, with the third placed nations of each pool entering a play-off, the top two ranked sides from the playoff enter round 3. Round 3 consists of 10 nations playing each other twice in two pools of five nations. Winners of each pool enter a play-off, with the play-off winner entering Round 4. The European Nations Cup, consisting of six nations will all gain a place in either Round 4 or 5. The top three nations enter Round 5, with the bottom three entering Round 4. Winners of Round 4 enter Round 5. Round 5 is broken up into two pools of three nations, the first placed nation of a pool qualifies for the World Cup (Europe 1 and Europe 2) while second placed sides of the Round 5 pools enter Round 6. Round 6 is a two-game tournament which Europe 3 (World Cup entry) and Europe 4 (repechage).

=== Oceania ===
There are two available positions in the World Cup of Oceanic nations, with a potential third in the form of a Repechage. the tournament is split up into four rounds. Round 1a sees three nations from the Oceania East region play each other once, the winner of the group will qualify for Round 2. Round 1b sees three nations from the Oceania West region play each other once, the winner of the group will also qualify for Round 2. Round 3 is a two match playoff between the winners of Round 1a and 1b. The winner moves to Round 4. Round 3 is a three nation tournament, teams play each other twice. The top two ranked nations will enter the World Cup as Oceania 1 and Oceania 2. The third ranked nation moves to Round 4. The winner of the two game Round 4 tournament advances to Repechage 2 where they meet Asia 1 for a World Cup place.

== See also ==
- List of nations in qualification for the 2007 Rugby World Cup
