= West Indian cricket team in Pakistan in 2006–07 =

West Indies in Pakistan 2006–07
| | Pakistan | West Indies |
- Dates: 8 November – 16 December 2006
| Captains | Inzamam-ul-Haq | Brian Lara |

Test series
- Result: Pakistan won the 3-match series 2–0
| Most runs | Mohammad Yousuf (665) | Brian Lara (448) |
| Most wickets | Umar Gul (16) | Jerome Taylor (13) |
- Player of the series: Mohammad Yousuf

One Day International series
- Results: Pakistan won the 5-match series 3–1
| Most runs | Mohammad Hafeez (124) | Marlon Samuels (172) |
| Most wickets | Rana Naved-ul-Hasan (11) | Corey Collymore (5) |
- Player of the series: Rana Naved-ul-Hasan

The West Indies cricket team toured Pakistan for cricket matches in the 2006–07 cricket season. The tour immediately followed the 2006 ICC Champions Trophy in India, where West Indies reached the final, and they played their first tour match three days after playing the final. Pakistan's recent results included a 3–0 loss in a Test series in England, where the final match ended in farce, and they were eliminated at the group stage of the Champions Trophy. The Pakistan Cricket Board had also recently suspended fast bowlers Shoaib Akhtar and Mohammad Asif due to a doping case.

== Squads ==
Pakistan
| Name | Style | Domestic team(s) |
|---|---|---|
| Inzamam-ul-Haq c | RHB, SLA | WAPDA, Multan |
| Kamran Akmal wk | RHB | NBP, Lahore Ravi |
| Abdul Razzaq | RHB, RFM | Lahore Ravi |
| Abdur Rehman | LHB, SLA | HBL, Sialkot |
| Danish Kaneria | RHB, LB | HBL, Karachi Urban |
| Faisal Iqbal | RHB, RM | PIA, Karachi Harbour |
| Imran Farhat | LHB, LB | HBL, Lahore Shalimar |
| Mohammad Hafeez | RHB, OB | SNGPL, Faisalabad |
| Mohammad Yousuf | RHB | WAPDA, Lahore Ravi |
| Samiullah Khan Niazi | RHB, LMF | SNGPL, Faisalabad |
| Shahid Nazir | RHB, RFM | HBL, Faisalabad |
| Shoaib Malik | RHB, OB | PIA, Sialkot |
| Umar Gul | RHB, RFM | PIA, Peshawar |
| Yasir Hameed | RHB, OB | PIA, Peshawar |
| Younis Khan | RHB, RM | HBL, Peshawar |

West Indies
| Name | Style | Domestic team(s) |
|---|---|---|
| Brian Lara c | LHB, LB | Trinidad and Tobago |
| Denesh Ramdin wk | RHB | Trinidad and Tobago |
| Omari Banks | RHB, OB | Leeward Islands |
| Dwayne Bravo | RHB, RMF | Trinidad and Tobago |
| Shivnarine Chanderpaul | LHB, LB | Guyana |
| Corey Collymore | RHB, RFM | Barbados |
| Fidel Edwards | RHB, RF | Barbados |
| Daren Ganga | RHB, OB | Trinidad and Tobago |
| Chris Gayle | LHB, OB | Jamaica |
| Dave Mohammed | LHB, SLW | Trinidad and Tobago |
| Runako Morton | RHB, OB | Leeward Islands |
| Daren Powell | RHB, RFM | Jamaica |
| Ramnaresh Sarwan | RHB, LB | Guyana |
| Lendl Simmons | RHB, RMF | Trinidad and Tobago |
| Jerome Taylor | RHB, RF | Jamaica |

== Tour matches ==
=== Patron's XI v West Indians ===
The PCB Patron's XI made 305 for four declared on the first day, with Salman Butt retiring after making 106, sharing an opening stand of 175 with Yasir Hameed, who was first to fall, caught behind off Dave Mohammed for 92. On the second day, West Indies replied with 279 for five, with Dwayne Bravo replicating Butt's feat. No bowler took more than one wicket in the game.

8–9 November
Scorecard

| Pakistan Cricket Board Patron's XI | v | West Indians |
| 305/4d (77 overs); Salman Butt 106 (176); Dwayne Bravo 1/29 (10 overs) | | 279/5 (68.3 overs); Dwayne Bravo 108 (114); Mohammad Irshad 1/24 (8.3 overs) |

Match Drawn
Bagh-e-Jinnah, Lahore
Umpires: Nadeem Ghauri (Pak) and Zameer Haider (Pak)

- Pakistan Cricket Board Patron's XI won the toss and elected to bat.

== Test series ==
=== 1st Test ===
11–14 November
Scorecard

| West Indies | v | Pakistan |
| 206 (56.1 overs); Brian Lara 61 (106); Umar Gul 5/65 (15.1 overs) | | 485 (146 overs); Mohammad Yousuf 192 (330); Jerome Taylor 4/115 (33 overs) |
| 291 (94 overs); Brian Lara 122 (215); Umar Gul 4/99 (29 overs) | | 13/1 (5.1 overs); Imran Farhat 8* (14); Corey Collymore 1/2 (3 overs) |

Pakistan won by 9 wickets
Gaddafi Stadium, Lahore, Pakistan
Umpires: Asoka de Silva (SL) and Simon Taufel (Aus)
Player of the match: Umar Gul (Pak)

- West Indies won the toss and elected to bat.

West Indies batted first, but Pakistan earned a first innings lead of 279, enough to stretch West Indies' their sequence of Tests without a win to 14, and they had now played 17 Tests away from home without a win. The visitors started with an opening stand of 41, but then four wickets fell within 26 balls, and they were 52 for four. Brian Lara made a half-century and Dwayne Bravo and Dave Mohammed chipped in with 30s, but Umar Gul (five for 65 including the last three wickets) and Shahid Nazir (three for 42) had done the damage, and they were bowled out for 206.

Pakistan's score at the fall of the second wicket was just four ahead of the West Indies'; however, Mohammad Yousuf nearly outscored the West Indies on his own. He shared century stands with Shoaib Malik and Kamran Akmal, while Jerome Taylor took four wickets in his 33 overs. Dave Mohammed bowled 31 overs, taking three for 98 including the two last batsmen, but West Indies had to make 279 just to see Pakistan bat again.

They did, just. Overnight on day three they were 74 for three, with two wickets taken by Umar Gul, as opener Daren Ganga fell in single figures for the second time in the match. Nightwatchman Fidel Edwards hung around for an hour in a partnership of 45 with Lara, and Lara added a further 137, but three wickets fell in the eleven overs before tea on day four, starting with Lara going lbw to part-timer Mohammad Hafeez, who bowled four overs in the game. Shivnarine Chanderpaul was caught off Shahid Nazir with the new ball, and West Indies made 291 after Mohammed's 15; Pakistan chased 13, though they did lose one wicket, opener Hafeez lbw to Corey Collymore for the latter's only wicket in the game.

=== 2nd Test ===
19–23 November
Scorecard

| Pakistan | v | West Indies |
| 357 (124 overs); Imran Farhat 74 (158); Jerome Taylor 5/91 (26 overs) | | 591 (167.4 overs); Brian Lara 216 (262); Danish Kaneria 5/181 (46 overs) |
| 461/7 (147.4 overs); Mohammad Yousuf 191 (344); Dave Mohammed 3/101 (27.4 overs) |

Match drawn
Multan Cricket Stadium, Multan, Pakistan
Umpires: Mark Benson (Eng) and Daryl Harper (Aus)
Player of the match: Mohammad Yousuf (Pak)

- Pakistan won the toss and elected to bat.
- Shivnarine Chanderpaul (WI) played in his 100th Test.

=== 3rd Test ===
27–30 November
Scorecard

| Pakistan | v | West Indies |
| 304 (100.5 overs); Mohammad Yousuf 102 (158); Corey Collymore 3/57 (21 overs) | | 260 (96 overs); Daren Ganga 81 (211); Umar Gul 4/79 (24 overs) |
| 399/6d (123.5 overs); Mohammad Yousuf 124 (195); Ramnaresh Sarwan 2/70 (17.5 overs) | | 244 (76 overs); Shivnarine Chanderpaul 69 (111); Danish Kaneria 3/69 (26 overs) |

Pakistan won by 199 runs
National Stadium, Karachi, Karachi, Pakistan
Umpires: Mark Benson (Eng) and Daryl Harper (Aus)
Player of the match: Mohammad Yousuf (Pak)

- Pakistan won the toss and elected to bat.

== ODI series ==
=== 1st ODI ===
5 December
Scorecard

| Pakistan | v | West Indies |

Match abandoned without a ball bowled
Rawalpindi Cricket Stadium, Rawalpindi
Umpires: Aleem Dar (Pak) and Daryl Harper (Aus)

=== 2nd ODI ===
7 December
Scorecard

| West Indies; 151 (49.5 overs) | v | Pakistan; 154/8 (48.2 overs) |
| Runako Morton 43 (66); Umar Gul 2/19 (9.5 overs) | | Inzamam-ul-haq 42* (86); Corey Collymore 3/19 (10 overs) |

Pakistan won by 2 wickets
Iqbal Stadium, Faisalabad
Umpires: Aleem Dar & Daryl Harper (AUS)
Player of the match: Inzamam-ul-Haq

- Pakistan won the toss and elected to field.

=== 3rd ODI ===
10 December
Scorecard

| West Indies; 207/7 (46.3 overs) | v | Pakistan; 192/3 (33.4 overs) |
| Lendl Simmons 73 (130); Rana Naved-ul-Hasan 3/37 (8.3 overs) | | Imran Farhat 58 (72); Chris Gayle 2/32 (6 overs) |

Pakistan won by 7 wickets (D/L method)
Gaddafi Stadium, Lahore
Umpires: Asad Rauf & Nigel Llong (ENG)
Player of the match: Rana Naved-ul-Hasan

- Pakistan won the toss and elected to field.

=== 4th ODI ===
13 December
Scorecard

| Pakistan; 209 (49.5 overs) | v | West Indies; 212/3 (43.5 overs) |
| Yasir Hameed 71 (118); Daren Powell 3/33 (10 overs) | | Marlon Samuels 100* (99); Rana Naved-ul-Hasan 2/18 (6 overs) |

West Indies won by 7 wickets
Multan Cricket Stadium, Multan
Umpires: Nigel Llong (ENG) & Zameer Haider
Player of the match: Marlon Samuels

- Pakistan won the toss and elected to bat.

=== 5th ODI ===
16 December
Scorecard

| West Indies; 238/7 (50 overs) | v | Pakistan; 239/3 (46.5 overs) |
| Shivnarine Chanderpaul 101 (142); Rana Naved-ul-Hasan 4/43 (10 overs) | | Mohammad Hafeez 92 (111); Chris Gayle 1/41 (8 overs) |

Pakistan won by 7 wickets
National Stadium, Karachi
Umpires: Asad Rauf & Nigel Llong (ENG)
Player of the match: Rana Naved-ul-Hasan

- Pakistan won the toss and elected to field.
