= BTBA Nationals =

The BTBA Nationals (also known as the BTBA National Championships) is a ten-pin bowling national championship tournament held in the United Kingdom by the British Tenpin Bowling Association (BTBA). It is also sanctioned and governed by the BTBA and is held annually in March, since its inaugural inception match in 1961.

== History ==
The BTBA Nationals tournament itself is open only to those who are members of the BTBA, in order to compete for the national championship.

The BTBA Nationals has a number of categories and levels and is open to both men and women in singles, doubles and team categories in three divisions (A, B and C).

== Past events ==
- 2008 event
- 2007 event
- 2006 event
- 2005 event
- 2004 event
- 2003 event
- 2002 event
- 2001 event
