= Bryan Pata =

American football player (1984–2006)

- Pata's Miami team photo

No. 95
- Position: Defensive lineman

Personal information
- Born: August 12, 1984; Miami, Florida, US
- Died: November 7, 2006 (aged 22); Kendall, Florida, US
- Listed height: 6 ft 4 in (1.93 m)
- Listed weight: 272 lb (123 kg)

Career information
- High school: North Miami (North Miami, Florida); Miami Central (Miami, Florida)
- College: Miami (FL) (2003–2006)

Bryan Sidney Pata (August 12, 1984 – November 7, 2006) was an American college football player who was a defensive lineman for the Miami Hurricanes. Pata was murdered after leaving a football practice during his fourth year at the school. While no resolution has been reached in the case, Pata's former Miami teammate, Rashaun Jones, was arrested for the murder in 2021.

== Career ==
Pata played three seasons at North Miami High School before moving on to Miami Central High School. He was named to Super Prep's All-America team, and rated as the nation's 26th-best defensive lineman by that magazine. The Atlanta Journal-Constitution also named him as one of the top 100 players in the South. He chose to attend the University of Miami after also considering Rutgers University, the University of Florida and the University of Oklahoma. He majored in criminology.

Pata was in his fourth year with the Hurricanes and was expected to be selected in the 2007 NFL draft. He appeared in 41 games during his college career, making 23 starts. Pata played primarily defensive tackle in his last season, totaling 13 tackles and two sacks. He had been placed on the watch list for the Hendricks Award, awarded to college football's top defensive end.

== Death ==
On November 7, 2006, Pata was shot and killed outside of his apartment complex in Kendall, Florida, after leaving team practice earlier that day. The Miami-Dade police ruled the shooting to be a homicide. Pata was 22 years old. No suspects were arrested until August 19, 2021, when former Miami football teammate Rashaun Jones was arrested and charged with the murder of Pata. Jones's long-delayed trial was scheduled to begin in October 2025. On March 2, 2026, Jones's trial ended in a mistrial due to a hung jury.

== See also ==
- List of gridiron football players who died during their careers
