= Benazir Bhutto =

Prime Minister of Pakistan (1988–1990; 1993–1996)

Mohtarma Benazir Bhutto
- بينظير بُھٹو
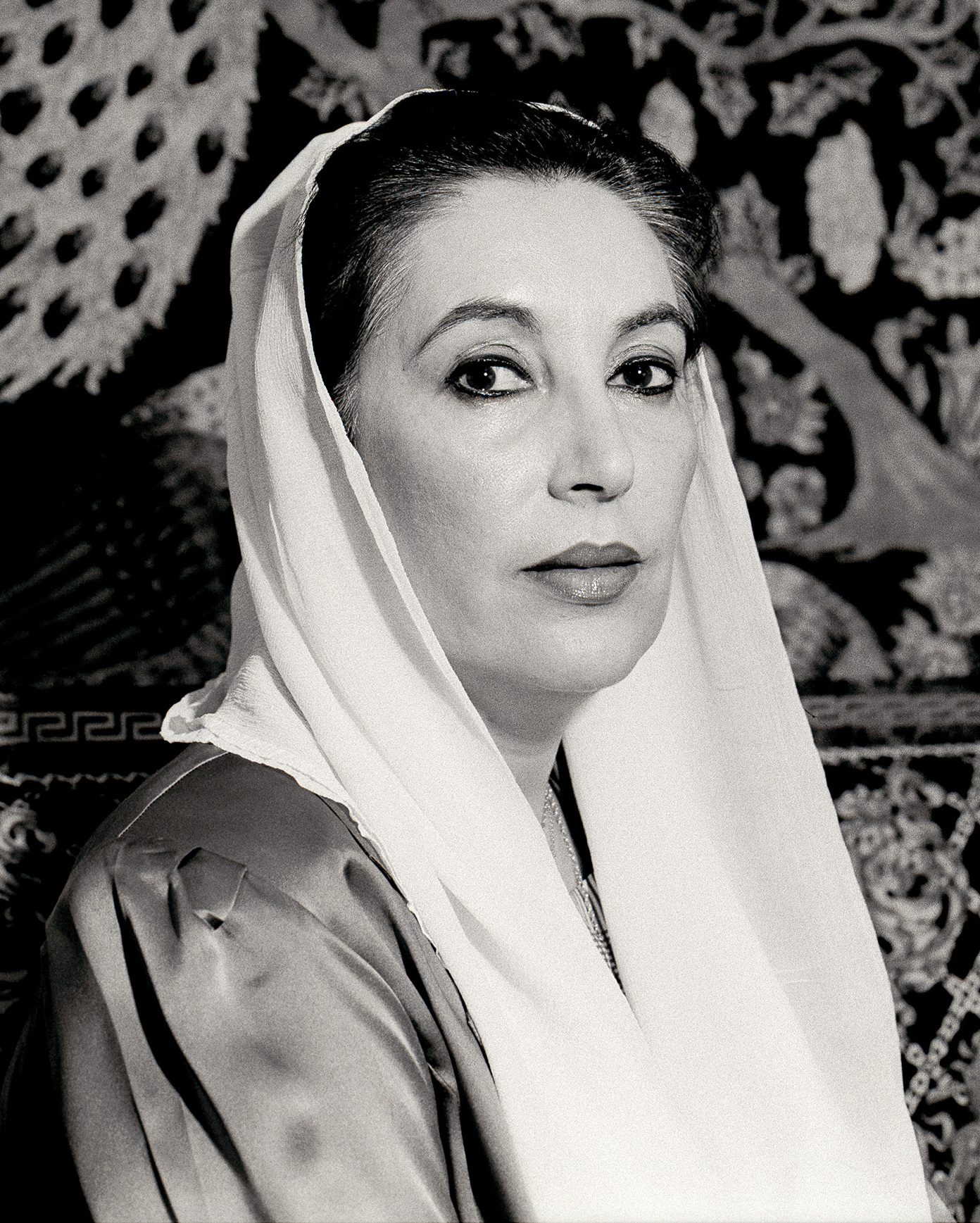
- Portrait, c. 2006

11th and 13th Prime Minister of Pakistan
- In office 18 October 1993 – 5 November 1996
- President: Wasim Sajjad (acting); Farooq Leghari
- Preceded by: Moeenuddin Ahmad Qureshi (acting)
- Succeeded by: Malik Meraj Khalid (acting)
- In office 2 December 1988 – 6 August 1990
- President: Ghulam Ishaq Khan
- Preceded by: Muhammad Khan Junejo
- Succeeded by: Ghulam Mustafa Jatoi (acting)

13th and 15th Leader of the Opposition
- In office 17 February 1997 – 12 October 1999
- Preceded by: Nawaz Sharif
- Succeeded by: Fazl-ur-Rehman
- In office 6 November 1990 – 18 April 1993
- Preceded by: Khan Abdul Wali Khan
- Succeeded by: Nawaz Sharif

Chairperson of the Pakistan People's Party
- In office 12 November 1982 – 27 December 2007
- Preceded by: Nusrat Bhutto
- Succeeded by: Asif Ali Zardari; Bilawal Bhutto Zardari

Personal details
- Born: 21 June 1953 Karachi, Sindh, Pakistan
- Died: 27 December 2007 (aged 54) Rawalpindi, Punjab, Pakistan
- Cause of death: Assassination by bombing
- Resting place: Bhutto family mausoleum
- Party: Pakistan People's Party
- Spouse: Asif Ali Zardari (m. 1987)
- Children: 3, inc. Bilawal and Aseefa
- Parent(s): Zulfikar Ali Bhutto (father); Nusrat Bhutto (mother)
- Relatives: Bhutto family; Zardari family
- Education: Radcliffe College (BA); University of Oxford (MSt)
- Awards: UN Human Rights Award (2008)

Benazir Bhutto (Note: /ˈbɛnəzɪər ˈbuːtoʊ/ BEN-ə-zeer BOO-toh; Urdu: بینظیر بُھٹو, IPA: [beːnəˈziːr ˈbʱʊʈːoː]; Sindhi: بينظير ڀُٽو.) (21 June 1953 – 27 December 2007) was a Pakistani stateswoman who twice served as the Prime Minister of Pakistan from 1988 to 1990 and again from 1993 to 1996. She was the first woman elected to head a democratic government in a Muslim-majority country. Ideologically a liberal and a secularist, she chaired the Pakistan People's Party (PPP) from 1982 until her assassination in 2007.

Of Sindhi and Kurdish parentage, Bhutto was born in Karachi to the politically significant and aristocratic Bhutto family. She studied at Harvard University and the University of Oxford, where she served as President of the Oxford Union. In 1977 she returned to Pakistan during her father Zulfikar Ali Bhutto's socialist government; shortly afterward, her father was ousted in a military coup and executed. Bhutto and her mother, Nusrat Bhutto, took control of the PPP and led the country's Movement for the Restoration of Democracy (MRD). Bhutto was repeatedly imprisoned by Zia-ul-Haq's military government and self-exiled to Britain in 1984. She returned in 1986 and—influenced by Thatcherite economics—transformed the PPP's platform from a socialist to a liberal one, before leading it to victory in the 1988 election, becoming Pakistan's first and only female prime minister. As prime minister, her attempts at reform were stifled by conservative and Islamist forces, including President Ghulam Ishaq Khan and the Pakistani military. Her administration, having been accused of corruption and nepotism, was dismissed by Khan in 1990. Intelligence services rigged the following election to ensure a victory for the conservative Islamic Democratic Alliance (IJI), at which point Bhutto became the Leader of the Opposition.

After Nawaz Sharif's IJI government was also dismissed on corruption charges, Bhutto led the PPP to victory in the 1993 elections. In her second term, she oversaw economic privatisation and attempts to advance women's rights. Her government was beset with instability, including the assassination of her brother Murtaza, a failed coup d'état in 1995, and a bribery scandal involving her and her husband Asif Ali Zardari; in response, President Farooq Leghari dismissed her government. The PPP lost the 1997 election and in 1998 she went into self-exile again, living between Dubai and London for the next decade. A widening corruption inquiry culminated in a 2003 conviction in a Swiss court. Following the United States–brokered negotiations with Pakistani president Pervez Musharraf, she returned to Pakistan in 2007 to run in the 2008 elections. Her platform emphasised civilian oversight of the military and opposition to growing Islamist violence. After a political rally in Rawalpindi, she was assassinated. The Salafi jihadist militant group al-Qaeda claimed responsibility, although involvement of the Pakistani Taliban and rogue elements of the intelligence services were also hypothesised. She was buried at her family mausoleum in Garhi Khuda Bakhsh.

Opinions on Bhutto were deeply divided. Critics accused her of being politically inexperienced and corrupt, while Islamist and conservative forces opposed her secularist, modernising agenda. She was nevertheless domestically popular early in her career and was praised as a champion of democracy. Posthumously, she came to be regarded as an icon for women's rights due to her political success in a male-dominated society.

== Early life and education ==
Bhutto was born at Pinto's Nursing Home on 21 June 1953 in Karachi, Sindh (which constituted the Federal Capital Territory at that time). Her father was the barrister and politician Zulfikar Ali Bhutto and her mother was Begum Nusrat Ispahani. The latter was born in Isfahan, Persia (now Iran) to a wealthy merchant family, to a father of Persian descent and a mother of Kurdish descent. Zulfikar was the son of Shah Nawaz Bhutto, a prominent politician who had served as Prime Minister of the Junagadh State. The Bhuttos were aristocratic, wealthy landlords from Sindh, part of the waderos or landed gentry. They were Sunni Muslims, although Nusrat had been born into a Shia Muslim family before converting to Sunnism on her marriage.

The couple had married in September 1951, and Benazir was their first child. She was given the name of an aunt who had died young. The Bhuttos' three younger children were Murtaza (born 1954), Sanam (1957), and Shahnawaz (1958). When the elderly Shah Nawaz died in 1957, Zulfikar inherited the family's land holdings, making him extremely wealthy.

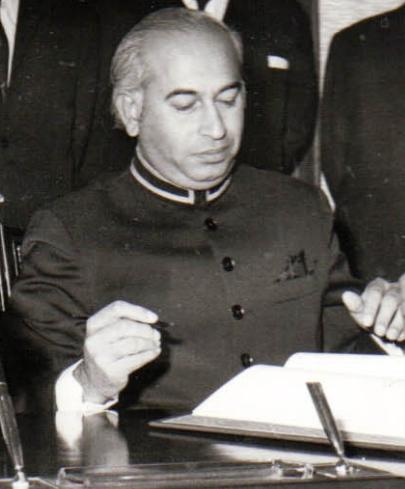
Zulfikar Ali Bhutto, her father, was the Prime Minister of Pakistan and the founding chairman of the Pakistan People's Party.

Benazir's first language was English; as a child she spoke Urdu less frequently although she was fluent, and barely spoke the local Sindhi language. Her mother taught her some Persian as a child. Benazir initially attended the Lady Jennings Nursery School in Karachi. She was then sent to the Convent of Jesus and Mary in Karachi and from there to the Jesus and Mary Convent, a boarding school in Murree. Murree is near the border with India, and during the Indo-Pakistani War of 1965 Bhutto and the other pupils underwent air-raid practices. Taking her exams in December 1968, Bhutto passed her O-levels with high grades.

Throughout her youth, Bhutto idolised her father, and he, in turn, encouraged her educational development in contravention of traditional approaches to women then pervasive in Pakistan. Relations between her parents were however strained during her childhood; Zulfikar embarked on extra-marital affairs with other women, and when Nusrat objected he had her thrown out of their house. She moved to Iran, but after Zulfikar prevented her children from joining her there, she returned to Pakistan six months later, settling in Karachi. Throughout her life, Bhutto never publicly acknowledged this internal family discord.

When Bhutto was five, her father became the cabinet minister for energy, and when she was nine he became the country's foreign minister. From an early age, she was exposed to foreign diplomats and figures who were visiting her father, among them Zhou Enlai, Henry Kissinger, and Hubert Humphrey. When she was thirteen, he resigned from the government and a year later established his own political party, the Pakistan People's Party (PPP). The PPP used the motto "Islam is our faith, democracy is our policy, socialism is our economy. All power to the people." It employed a populist strategy to attract votes, promising "roti, kapra aur makan" (bread, clothes, and housing) for every Pakistani and insisting that the disputed territory of Kashmir would be transferred from Indian to Pakistani control. Benazir immediately joined. Amid riots against the government of President Ayub Khan, in 1968 Zulfikar was arrested and imprisoned for three months, during which he wrote to Benazir to encourage her studies.

=== University studies ===
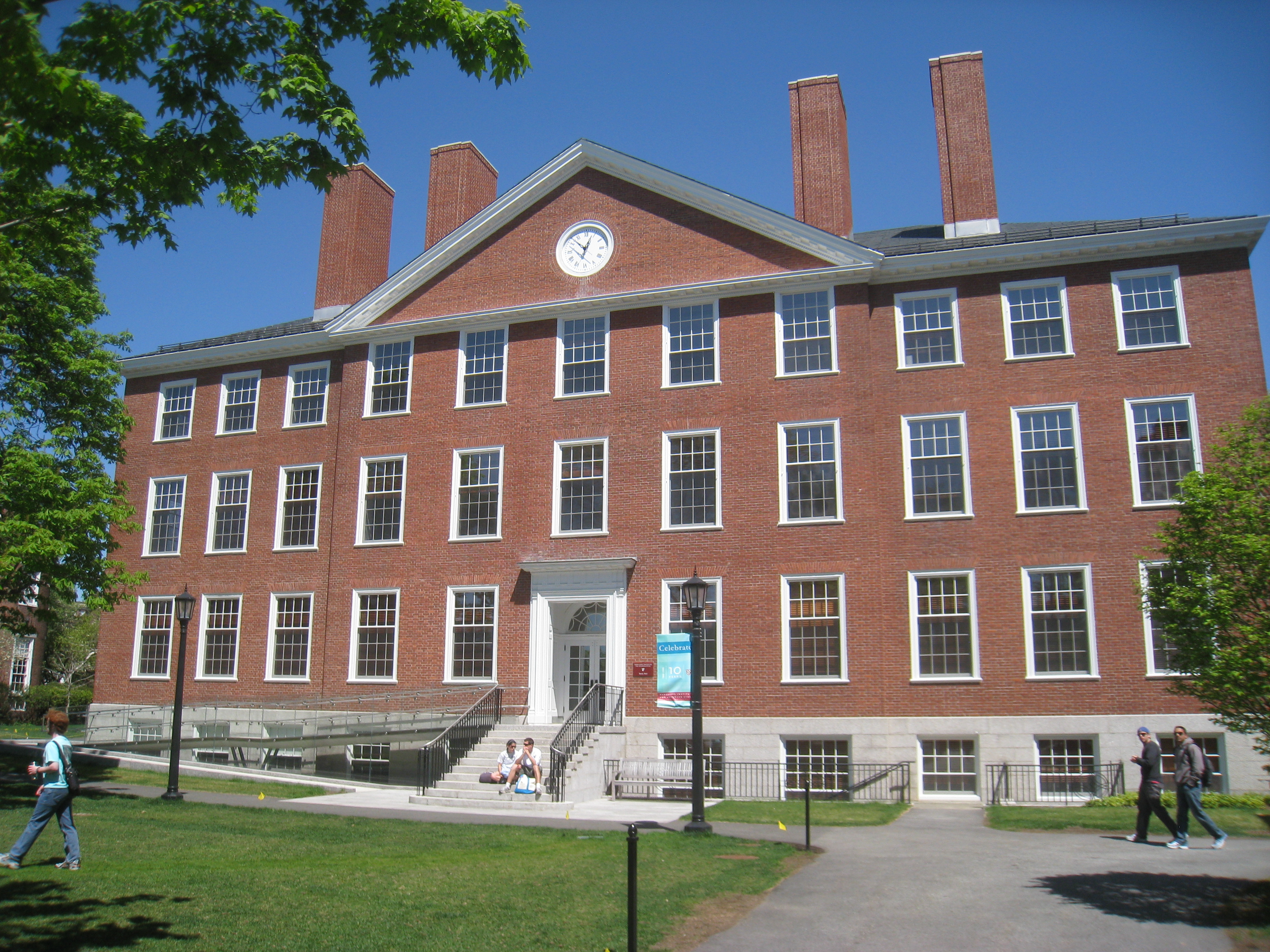
Bhutto took her undergraduate degree at Radcliffe College, Harvard.

From 1969 to 1973, Bhutto studied for an undergraduate degree at Radcliffe College. She started when she was sixteen, which was younger than normal, but Zulfikar had pulled strings to allow her premature admittance. Zulfikar asked his friend John Kenneth Galbraith, an economics professor at Harvard who had formerly been a U.S. ambassador to India, to be her local guardian. Through him, Bhutto met his son Peter Galbraith, who became a lifelong friend. Murtaza joined Bhutto at Harvard a year later. Bhutto found it difficult adjusting to life in the United States. A fellow student said she "cried most of her first semester", although Bhutto later called her time at Harvard "four of the happiest years of my life". She became a campus tour guide with the Crimson Key Society and the social secretary of her dormitory, Eliot House. She involved herself in campaigns against American involvement in the Vietnam War, joining a Moratorium Day protest on Boston Common. She encountered activists involved in second wave feminism although was sceptical of some of the views expressed within the movement. At Harvard, Bhutto majored in comparative government and graduated cum laude with a Bachelor of Arts in 1973.

In 1971, while she was at Harvard, Zulfikar invited her to join him in New York City, where he was involved in a United Nations Security Council meeting on that year's Indo-Pakistani War. In December 1971, Zulfikar assumed the presidency of Pakistan, the first democratically elected leader after 13 years of military rule. In 1972, Benazir accompanied her father to the India-Pakistan Summit in Simla as a replacement for her mother, who was ill. There, she was introduced to the Indian prime minister Indira Gandhi. While in Simla, she attracted much attention from both local and national Indian press, the first time she received such notice. She attributed this to the fact that—in her words—she "symbolised a new generation. I had never been an Indian. I had been born in independent Pakistan. I was free of the complexes and prejudices which had torn Indians and Pakistanis apart in the bloody trauma of partition." In 1974, she flew to Lahore to accompany her father at the Organisation of Islamic Cooperation's summit. Here, she met a number of the assembled senior Muslim world leaders, who included Libya's Muammar Gaddafi, Egypt's Anwar Sadat, Syria's Hafez al-Assad, Saudi Arabia's Faisal, and Jordan's Hussein.

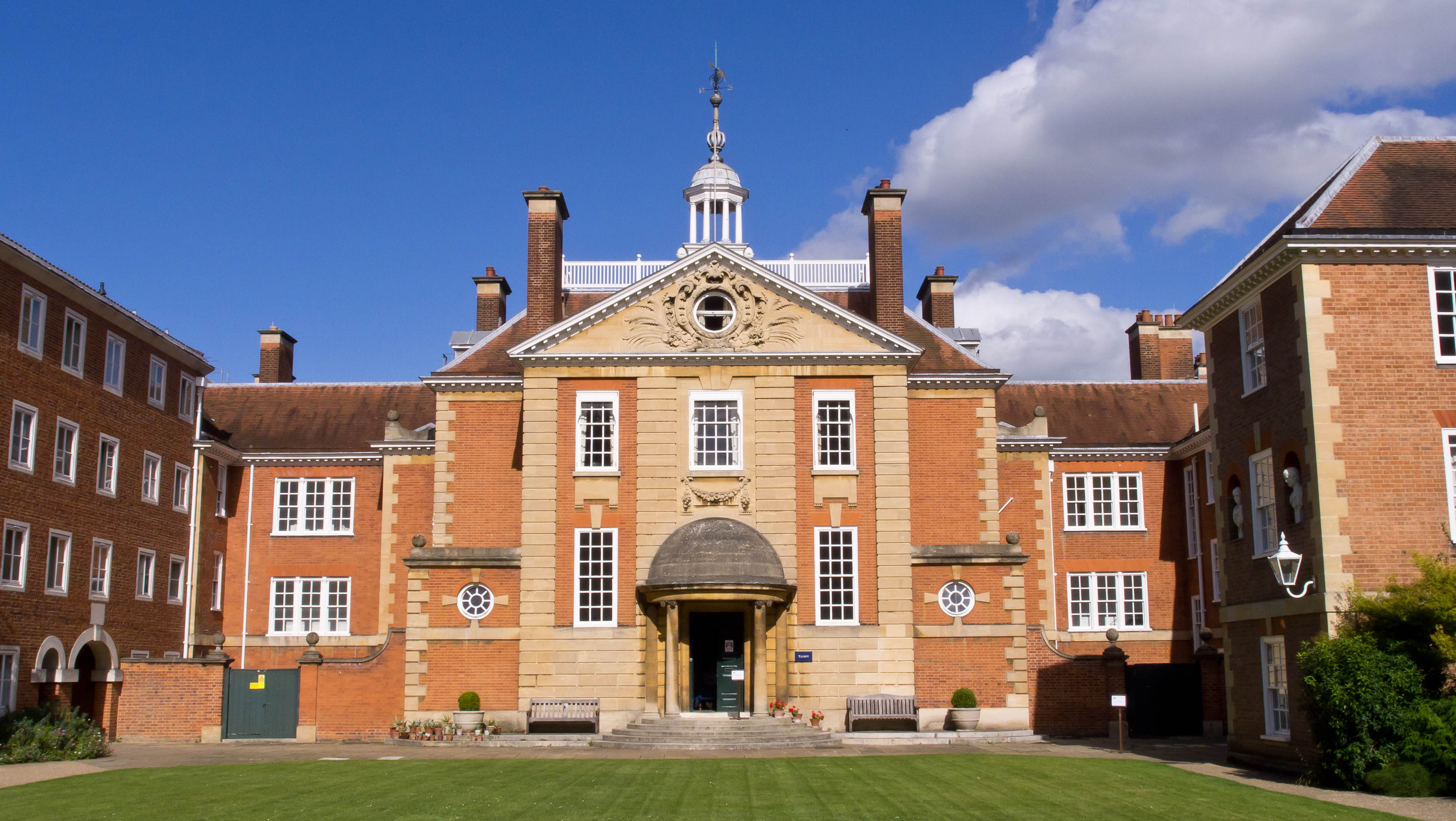
At the University of Oxford, Bhutto attended Lady Margaret Hall for her undergraduate studies.

In autumn 1973, Bhutto relocated to the United Kingdom and began studying for a second undergraduate degree, in Philosophy, Politics and Economics, at Lady Margaret Hall, University of Oxford. After three years, she received a second-class degree. At her father's insistence, she remained in Oxford to study for a one-year postgraduate degree, reading international law and diplomacy; at this point she attended St Catherine's College, Oxford. One of her fellow students at Oxford stated that there, she "epitomised the classic spoilt rich girl from a third world country". She nevertheless made friends, who later described her as a humorous and intellectually curious individual. In 1977, she was elected President of the Oxford Union debating society, the first Asian woman to hold that post. After her three-month term was up, she was succeeded by her close friend, Victoria Schofield. Bhutto was also active in the local Conservative Association and it is through this connection that she is widely believed to have introduced future British Prime Minister, Theresa May, to her future husband Philip May. Despite the ongoing tensions between Pakistan and India, she interacted socially with Indian students, and while at Oxford also made proposals of marriage to two fellow Pakistani students, but was rebuffed on both occasions. Bhutto biographer Brooke Allen thought that her time at Oxford was "almost certainly the happiest, most carefree time of her life".

At Oxford, she led a campaign calling for the university to give her father an honorary degree; she gained the support of her father's old tutor, the historian Hugh Trevor-Roper. Bhutto's campaign was opposed by counter-protests, who believed that her father's supposed involvement in the persecution of Sheikh Mujibur Rahman and atrocities during the Bangladesh Liberation War made him unsuitable. Ultimately, the university declined to award the honorary degree. In later years, Bhutto acknowledged that at this time she had been ignorant of the Pakistani Army's complicity in the atrocities in Bangladesh, although always maintained that her father was blameless on the issue. After her Oxford education, she returned to Pakistan in June 1977, where she was scheduled to work at the prime minister's office and the "Inter-Provincial Council of Common Interests" during the rest of the summer. Intent on a career in the Pakistani Foreign Service, she was scheduled to take the service's entrance exams later in the year.

== Early political career ==
=== Father's execution and her arrest ===
Other women on the subcontinent had picked up the political banners of their husbands, brothers, and fathers before me. The legacies of political families passing down through the women had become a South Asian tradition: Indira Gandhi in India; Sirimavo Bandaranaike in Sri Lanka; Fatima Jinnah and my own mother in Pakistan. I just never thought it would happen to me.

— Bhutto on the impact of her father.

In July 1977, Zulfikar Bhutto—who had just been re-elected in a general election—was overthrown in a military coup ("Operation Fair Play") led by Muhammad Zia-ul-Haq, the Chief of Army Staff. Both Zulfikar and Benazir believed that Zia's coup had been assisted by the U.S. Central Intelligence Agency (CIA); Zulfikar claimed that in a 1975 meeting, U.S. diplomat Henry Kissinger had told him that the U.S. would make "a horrible example" of him if he did not terminate Pakistan's efforts to build a nuclear bomb. Now in control of the country, Zia suspended the constitution, and initiated a regime that combined military rule with social programs designed to further the Islamisation of Pakistani society according to Islamic fundamentalist principles. Socialists, intellectuals, and journalists were arrested. Zulfikar, too, was arrested, initially for less than a month. After a crowd of over one million people greeted Zulfikar's release in Karachi and demonstrations were held in support of the ousted president, Zia decided to eliminate him permanently.

In September, Zulfikar was re-arrested and charged with the 1974 murder of Muhammad Ahmed Khan Kasuri, the father of Ahmed Raza Kasuri, a vocal critic of Zulfikar's government. After the coup, Bhutto's brothers were sent abroad to canvass international support for their father. Bhutto and her mother remained in Pakistan, although they were repeatedly detained for short periods. When she was able, Bhutto visited her father in prison. She and her mother put out a book about their father and encouraged PPP supporters to demonstrate in support of him. She also assisted in the preparation of his defence case, which was put before first the Lahore High Court, which sentenced him to death, and then the Supreme Court, which upheld that decision. Former U.S. attorney general Ramsey Clark attended the trial, relating that it was a kangaroo court and that Zulfikar did not receive a fair trial. Just before his execution, Zulfikar urged his wife and daughter to leave Pakistan, but they refused. He was executed by hanging in April 1979. Benazir and Nusrat were then imprisoned for six months, before being released and placed under house arrest for a further six months. The two women were only fully released in April 1980.

After the coup, Zulfikar had appointed his wife co-chair of the PPP, while in October 1977 Benazir was appointed to the PPP's central committee. After Zulfikar's death, Benazir replaced his role in the party, becoming its co-leader. In February 1981, she formally established the Movement for the Restoration of Democracy (MRD), a group that brought together the PPP with other political parties in the country: the Pakistan Muslim League, Pakistan Democratic Party, Mazdoor Kisan Party, National Awami Party, Quomi Mahaz-e-Azadi, Jamiat-i-Ulema-i-Islam, and the Tahrik-i-Istiqlal. The MRD called for a four-point program: an end to martial law, the restoration of the 1973 constitution, parliamentary elections, and the transfer of political power from the military to the elected representatives. There was nevertheless much mutual suspicion among the parties in the MRD, with Bhutto having reluctantly allowed groups that firmly opposed her father's government to join.

During Zia's regime, Bhutto opposed the Hudud Ordinances, which were a set of laws introduced in 1979 that imposed strict Islamic punishments for crimes such as theft, adultery, and alcohol consumption. She criticized the ordinances for being discriminatory against women and for enabling the misuse of the legal system to target them, particularly in cases of rape and adultery. Bhutto and the Pakistan Peoples Party advocated for reform or repeal of the laws, highlighting the need to protect women's rights and ensure justice.

From abroad, her brothers, Murtaza and Shahnawaz, turned to paramilitary action, founding the Al Zulfikar group which trained its members to carry out acts of assassination and sabotage to oust Zia's military government. After Al Zulfikar orchestrated the 1981 Pakistan International Airlines hijacking, the government used this as the pretext for re-arresting Bhutto and her mother in March. Bhutto disapproved of the hijacking, believing that it strengthened Zia's hand; that she was punished for it may have exacerbated tensions with her brothers. In July 1981, Nusrat was released so that she could seek medical treatment for cancer abroad, but Bhutto was not. She was kept for a time in Karachi before being moved to Sukkur prison and then back again to Karachi. During much of this period, she was held in solitary confinement, and experienced a range of health problems, including hair loss, gynaecological issues, and anorexia. In December, she was moved into house arrest, where she would remain for two years. In the United States—a key ally of Zia's regime—Peter Galbraith helped rally support for Bhutto, including from the politicians Claiborne Pell and James Buckley. When Zia visited Washington D.C. in December 1982, they raised the issue of Bhutto's imprisonment with him. As international pressure mounted, the Pakistani government agreed to release her, placing her on a flight to Geneva in January 1984.

=== Release and self-imposed exile ===
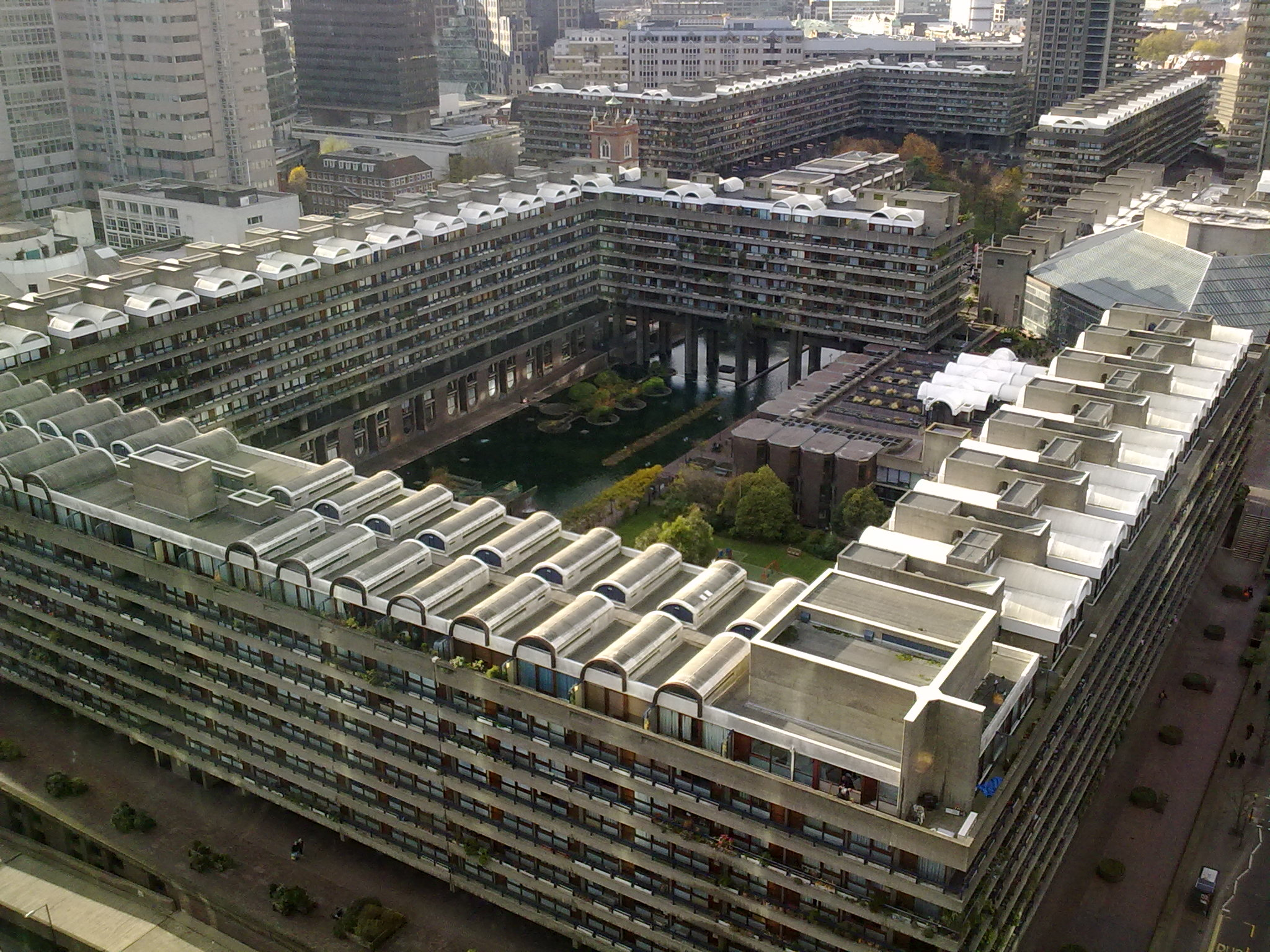
While in exile, Bhutto lived in central London's Barbican Estate.

From Geneva, Bhutto proceeded to the United Kingdom, undergoing surgery on her mastoid before renting a flat in London's Barbican Estate. There, she socialised with friends, going shopping, hosting dinner parties, and visiting the cinema. One friend said that after her time in prison she remained in "a mildly traumatised state, jumping at sudden noise and worrying about who might be spying on her". In March, Bhutto visited New York City and Washington D.C., where she met with media figures and middle-ranking government officials but was kept at bay by the administration of President Ronald Reagan. Over the coming few years, Bhutto made several additional visits to the United States, spoke to the European Parliament in Strasbourg, visited the Soviet Union, and undertook the Umrah pilgrimage to Mecca.

While in exile, Benazir became a rallying point for the PPP. Her flat became the unofficial headquarters of its members in exile; these volunteers devoted themselves to raising international awareness of the political prisoners being held by Zia's regime. Although she was the party's acting chairperson, many of its elder members were unhappy with this situation, believing her insufficiently committed to socialism and fearing that the party would become nothing more than a Bhutto family fiefdom. Murtaza believed that it was he, and not Benazir, who was their father's designated political heir; as evidence, he cited that he had been asked to manage his father's Larkana constituency in the 1977 general election. Bhutto biographer Shyam Bhatia thought that this was probably Zulfikar's intention, as the latter would have recognised the significant impediments to a woman being elected leader in a conservative Islamic society like Pakistan. Benazir nevertheless maintained that her father had always wanted her to become a politician.

In July 1985, Shahnawaz died under unexplained circumstances in the French city of Cannes. Bhutto varyingly claimed that Shahnawaz had been murdered by his wife, Raehana, or had been killed on the orders of Zia. Zia's government allowed her to bring her brother's body to Pakistan in August, where it could be interred in the family cemetery at Larkana. Shortly after the burial, she was arrested and detained under house arrest in Karachi until November, at which point she was released and returned to Europe. In December 1985, martial law was lifted in Pakistan and Bhutto decided to return home. She arrived at Lahore Airport in April 1986, where she was greeted by a large crowd. An estimated two million people came to see her speak at Iqbal Park, where she rallied against Zia's regime. She then visited Sindh, Punjab, and Balochistan, speaking to further crowds, and re-established links with the MRD, taking part in a pro-democracy rally on Independence Day on 14 August. Following the rally, she was again arrested and detained for several weeks in Landhi Jail.

Back in Pakistan, she agreed to an arranged marriage; her mother selected Asif Ali Zardari as a suitable husband. He was from a landowning family, and his father had obtained additional wealth through the construction and cinema industries. The marriage ceremony took place in the Clifton Palace Gardens at Karachi in December 1987. The event was billed as the "People's Wedding", serving as a de facto political rally, with a subsequent party in a Lyari stadium being attended by 200,000 people. There, some fired Kalashnikovs into the air in celebration, accidentally resulting in one death and multiple injuries. Bhutto would have been aware that being married gave her an image of respectability which would improve her chances of being elected. She kept the Bhutto family name rather than taking that of her new husband. After the wedding, she soon became pregnant and gave birth to her first son, Bilawal.

=== 1988 electoral campaign ===
The flag of the Pakistan People's Party, which Bhutto co-chaired after her father's execution

In May 1988, Zia dissolved the assemblies and called a November election. He had not wanted Bhutto to win, and his choice of date may have been deliberately chosen to coincide with the date when Bhutto was projected to give birth, thus hindering her ability to campaign. He also sought to hinder her chances by declaring that the election would be held on a non-party basis, with candidates standing as individuals rather than as representatives of a political party. Bhutto and the PPP launched a legal challenge against this latter stipulation. In August, Zia suddenly died when his aircraft crashed shortly after take-off from Bahawalpur Airport. A joint U.S.–Pakistani investigation was unable to ascertain the cause of the crash, although sabotage was widely suspected, with the Soviets, Americans, Indians, and Israelis all presented as potential culprits. Bhutto privately attributed it to an act of God. After Zia's death, the Supreme Court announced that the election should take place on a party basis, rather than the non-party basis that Zia had desired.

Bhutto insisted that the PPP campaign separately from the MRD, and dropped its socialist platform in favour of economic Thatcherism and a commitment to the free market. Amid predictions that the PPP would win, it received 18,000 prospective candidates, many offering the party money for their selection; this influx of new members and candidates caused upset among many established members, who felt that Bhutto was deserting them. In the build-up to the election, there was a great sense of hope among liberal sectors of Pakistani society. However, Islamic fundamentalists said it was un-Islamic for the country to have a female leader. Their propaganda foregrounded what they presented as her un-Islamic behaviour, including a photo of her dancing in a Parisian nightclub. Zia loyalists and Islamic fundamentalists united to form a new political party, Islami Jamhoori Ittehad (IJI), which was funded by the Inter-Services Intelligence (ISI). The ISI also engaged in vote rigging in an attempt to secure an IJI victory. Despite these difficulties, Bhutto led the PPP to victory in the election, taking 93 of the 205 contested seats. The IJI took only 54 seats, although the party secured control of Punjab, the country's largest and most powerful province. This meant that the PPP had the largest number of seats, although not a clear majority. Both the PPP and IJI courted independent MPs hoping to woo them to their side, and unsuccessful attempts were also made by the country's right-wing forces to convince some of the elected PPP parliamentarians to switch allegiance to the IJI.

The people of Pakistan had rejected bigotry and prejudice in electing a woman Prime Minister. It was an enormous honor and an equally enormous responsibility... I had not asked for this role; I had not asked for this mantle. But the forces of destiny and the forces of history had thrust me forward, and I felt privileged and awed.

— Bhutto on becoming prime minister in her autobiography

President Ghulam Ishaq Khan was constitutionally obliged to invite Bhutto to form the next government, but was reticent to do so. Under growing pressure—including from the U.S., a key ally—he reluctantly did so two weeks after the election. To build her government, Bhutto formed a coalition with the Muttahida Qaumi Movement (MQM) party, which had 13 seats in parliament, an action that upset the Sindhi nationalist faction within her party. She was sworn in as the prime minister of Pakistan on 2 December 1988. Bhutto became the first female prime minister in a Muslim-majority country, as well as Pakistan's second nationally elected prime minister. At 35 years old, she was the youngest elected leader in the Islamic world, the world's youngest prime minister, and the youngest female prime minister ever elected. After her election, party workers were encouraged to refer to her as Mohtarma ("respected lady"). There was hope among many observers that her premiership would mark a new era of multi-party democracy, growing gender equality, and better relations with India. She personally stated that her electoral victory was "the tipping point in the debate raging in the Muslim world on the role of women in Islam".

In 1988, Bhutto published her autobiography, sub-titled Daughter of the East in its British edition and Daughter of Destiny in the United States. It was written with the assistance of an American ghost writer. Bhutto biographer Brooke Allen stating that it was "pre-eminently a political performance" written for a Western audience, with the intent of "seducing Western opinion and opinion-makers". As well as whitewashing her father's regime, Bhutto's autobiography contained several factual falsifications; she wished to present herself as a ground-breaker when it came to gender issues, and thus presented her mother Nusrat as being far more conservative than she really was, for instance falsely claiming that Nusrat had urged her to wear the burqa when she had reached adolescence.

== First premiership (1988–1990) ==
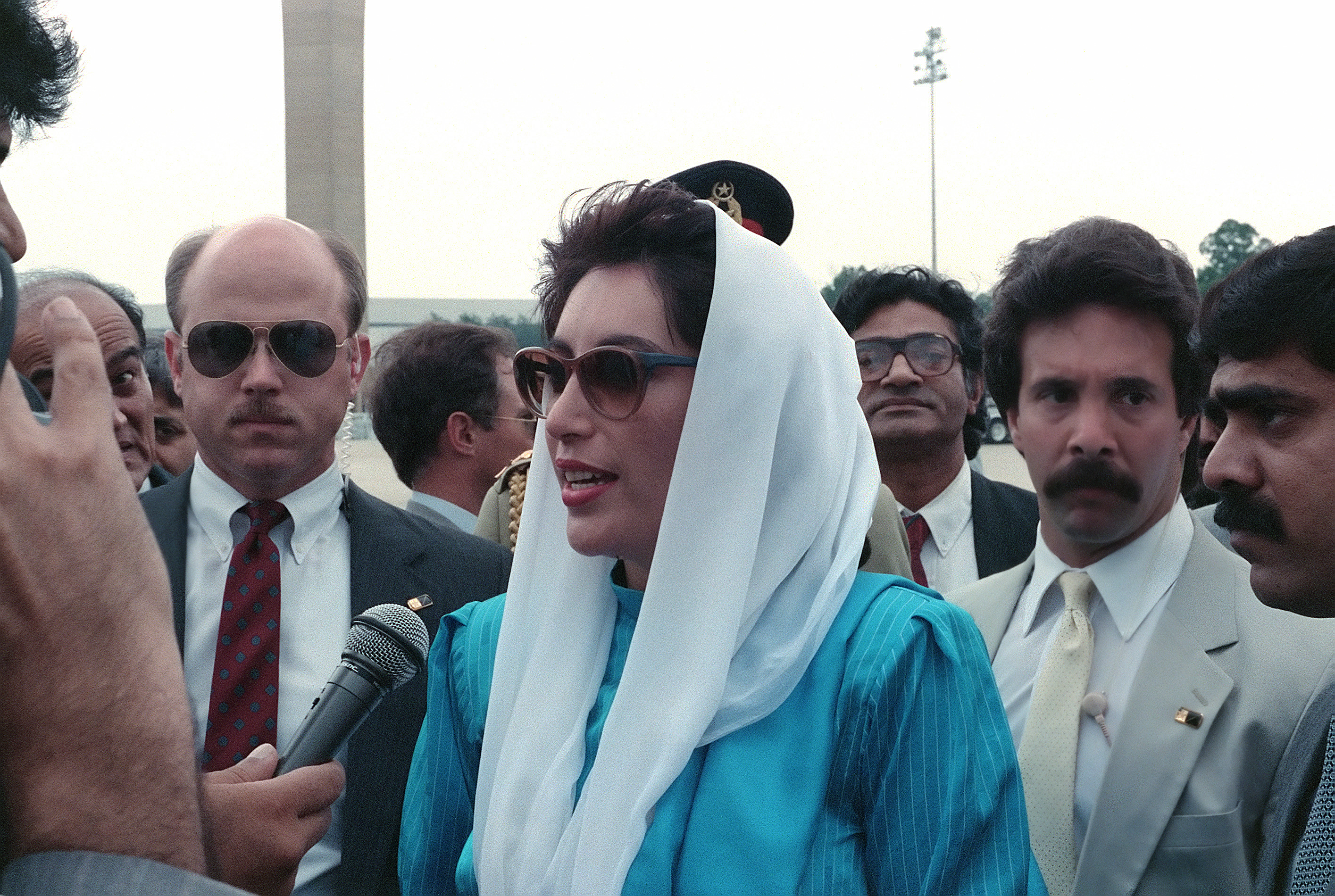
Bhutto in Washington, D.C., in 1989. She wore the white dupatta on her head to attract political support from Islamic clerics.

Bhutto's first cabinet was the largest in Pakistan's history. She appointed herself as the new treasury minister, with her mother as a senior minister without portfolio, and her father-in-law as chairman of the parliamentary public accounts committee, quashing hopes that her administration would depart from the entrenched systems of cronyism in the country. Most of those in the administration had little political experience. Various members of the PPP old guard, including Mumtaz Ali Bhutto, left the party in frustration at the pro-capitalist direction she had taken.

Following her election, there remained significant mistrust between Bhutto and the right-wing military administration; many senior military figures viewed her, like her father, as a threat to their dominant role in Pakistan's political arena. The country's three most powerful figures—Chief of Army Staff Aslam Beg, ISI chief Hamid Gul, and President Khan—all had contempt for her family. This opposition was substantial and contributed to Bhutto's inability to pass any major legislation during her first term in office. However, she had some successes with initiatives to encourage the development of civil society; she ensured the release of a number of political prisoners detained under the Zia government. and lifted the ban on trade unions and student associations. She removed many of the constraints imposed on non-governmental organisations, and introduced measures to lift the media censorship introduced by Zia's military administrations. She entrusted Shamsul Hasan with dismantling the National Press Trust, a conglomerate of over 15 newspapers, but President Khan delayed signing the documents and thus the Trust would only be broken up during her second premiership. A number of social reforms were carried out, such as the establishment of new literacy centres, new pension rights, and the abolition of admission and bed fees forced upon during the Zia regime.

Among the problems facing Pakistan when Bhutto took the Premiership was soaring employment and high unemployment. The Pakistani government was bankrupt, with Zia having borrowed at high-interest rates to pay government wages. Many of the policy promises she had made in her election campaign were not delivered because the Pakistani state was unable to finance them; she had claimed that a million new homes would be built each year and that universal free education and healthcare would be introduced, none of which was economically feasible for her government to deliver. The country also faced a growing problem with the illegal narcotics trade, with Pakistan being among the world's largest heroin exporters and the drug's use rapidly increasing domestically. Bhutto pledged that she would take tough action on the powerful drug barons.

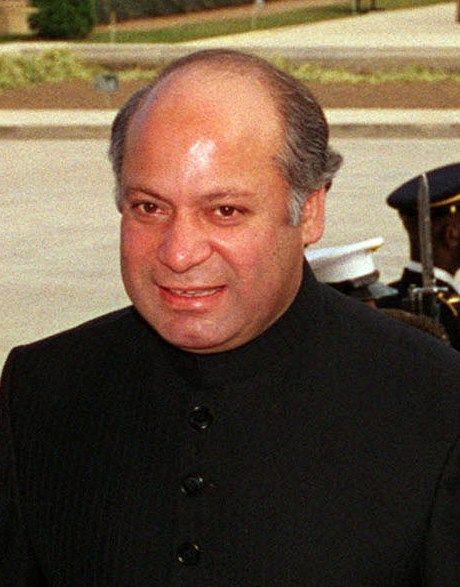
Nawaz Sharif, a conservative who had been loyal to Zia, remained a constant nemesis of Bhutto throughout her career.

Bhutto often argued with Beg, Gul, and Khan over her desired policies, and—according to Allen—"won some battles but ultimately lost the war" against them. Bhutto succeeded in getting Khan's approval to change two of the country's four provincial governors; she appointed General Tikka Khan, one of the few senior military officers who were loyal to her, as the governor of Punjab. She sought to replace the chair of the joint chiefs of staff, Iftikhar Ahmed Sirohey, but President Khan refused to permit this. Bhutto disliked Khan's hostile attitude toward her, but he had the backing of the military. In the presidential election, Bhutto initially proposed Malik Qasim, who had been involved in the MRD, as the PPP's nominee, but the military refused to accept this. Bhutto relented and agreed that Khan could be nominated as the PPP's presidential candidate. Bhutto also wanted to replace Mahbub ul Haq as a finance minister, but again the military opposed her. Compromising, she accepted ul Haq's continued role as finance minister but appointed Wasim Jafri as her financial advisor. Beg made it clear to Bhutto that the military would not tolerate her interference in their control of the defence and foreign affairs.

At the time, 60% of the country's population lived in Punjab province, which was under the control of Zia's protégé, Nawaz Sharif, as provincial Chief Minister. Both Sharif and Bhutto attempted to remove the other from power, with Bhutto accusing Sharif of having rigged the election to become Chief Minister. Sharif benefited from growing Punjabi chauvinism toward the country's Sindhi minority, as well as a perception that Bhutto—a Sindhi—was attacking the Punjab. Although Bhutto had long supported greater autonomy for Pakistan's provinces, she opposed it in the case of the Punjab. Sharif's Punjabi authority refused to accept the federal officials whom Bhutto posted there. Relations between Bhutto and Pakistan's civil service also deteriorated, causing paralysis of many state affairs; Bhutto spoke of it as "Zia's bureaucracy" and her perceived anti-Punjabi stance impacted many civil servants, of whom 80% were Punjabi.

In April 1989, opposition parties organised a parliamentary no-confidence vote in Bhutto's leadership, but it was defeated by 12 votes. Bhutto claimed that many National Assembly voters had been bribed to vote against her, with $10 million having been supplied for this by a Saudi Salafi cleric, Osama bin Laden, who sought to overthrow her government and replace it with an Islamic theocracy. Her conservative critics continued to claim it was un-Islamic for a woman to govern, and unsuccessfully tried to have Pakistan suspended from the international Organisation of Islamic Cooperation on this basis.

=== Foreign policy ===
During her first premiership, Bhutto went on a number of foreign trips, enhancing her image as the first female prime minister in the Islamic world. In these, she sought to attract foreign investment and aid for Pakistan. She also made efforts to cultivate good relationships with the leaders of Islamic countries who also had good relationships with her father, including Libya's Gaddafi, Abu Dhabi's Sheikh Zayed, and the Saudi royal family. In 1989, she attended the Commonwealth Heads of Government Meeting in Kuala Lumpur, where Pakistan was re-admitted to the Commonwealth of Nations. In January 1989, she made a second pilgrimage to Mecca, and in June visited the U.S. to address both houses of Congress and giving the commencement speech at Harvard.

As premier, Bhutto was reluctant to challenge the ISI's support for the Islamist mujahideen forces in Afghanistan which were then engaged in a civil war against the country's Marxist–Leninist government. The U.S. was funneling money to these mujahedeen through Pakistan, although preferred to deal directly with Beg, Gul, and Ishaq Khan rather than through Bhutto. In April 1989, Gul led an invasion of Afghanistan with the purpose of seizing Jalalabad, which was then to be formed into a capital from which the country's anti-Soviet, Islamist-dominated opposition forces could operate. When the operation failed and the Pakistanis were driven out by the Afghan Army, Gul blamed Bhutto's administration for the failure, claiming that someone in her entourage had leaked details of the mission to the Afghan government. Gul was too powerful for Bhutto to force him into retirement, but in May 1989 she transferred him from the ISI to another section of the military, placing a more trusted military figure in his role.

Bhutto initially attempted to improve relations with neighbouring India, withdrawing Zia's offer of a no-war pact and announcing the 1972 Simla Agreement as the basis of future relations. She invited Indian prime minister Rajiv Gandhi and his wife Sonia as her guests for a three-day visit in Islamabad following the South Asian Association for Regional Cooperation summit. Rajiv returned on a bilateral visit six months later. She pleased him by revoking Zia's offer of the Nishan-e-Pakistan award to the former Indian leader Morarji Desai. The two countries agreed to reduce their military levels along the border and agreed not to attack their respective nuclear installations. Bhutto claimed that she terminated support for Sikh separatists active in India, something which Zia had encouraged to destabilise Indian control in their half of the Punjab. This warming of relations angered many domestic Islamist and conservative forces; they alleged that she and Gandhi were having a sexual relationship, said that she was secretly an Indian agent, and also placed renewed emphasis on the fact that Bhutto's paternal grandmother had been born to a Hindu family.

The people of Kashmir do not fear death because they are Muslims. The Kashmiris have the blood of the mujahids and ghazis. The Kashmiris have the blood of muhajadeens because Kashmiris are the heirs of Prophet Mohammed, Hazrat Ali, and Hazrat Omar.
And the brave women of Kashmir? They know how to fight and also to live. And when they live, they do so with dignity. From every village only one voice will emerge: freedom; from every school only one voice will emerge: freedom; every child will shout, "freedom, freedom, freedom".

— Bhutto's speech rallying Kashmiri militants to fight for independence from India, 1990

After accusations of being too conciliatory towards India, Bhutto took a harder line against them, particularly on the Kashmir conflict. Amid growing Kashmiri protests against Indian rule, in interviews Bhutto expressed support for the Kashmiri Muslim community. She called on the United Nations to oversee the Kashmir plebiscite originally promised in 1948. Bhutto visited a training camp for pro-independence Kashmiris on the Pakistani side of the border and pledged $5 million for their cause; she followed this with further statements in support of the pro-independence groups. In one speech, she incited Kashmiri Muslims to rise up against their administration. Later, in a 1993 interview, Bhutto stated that supporting proxy wars in Punjab and Kashmir was the "one right thing" undertaken by Zia, presenting these in part as revenge for India's role in "the humiliating loss of Bangladesh".

In 1990, Major General Pervez Musharraf proposed a military invasion of Kargil as part of an attempt to annex Kashmir; Bhutto refused to back the plan, believing that the international condemnation would be severe. With both armies mobilising on either side of the border, there were growing fears that tensions over Kashmir could result in a nuclear war between Pakistan and India. The U.S. sent special envoy Robert Gates to the region to dissuade the Pakistanis from going to war. He could not meet Bhutto—who was in Yemen as part of a tour of the Gulf states—but met with President Khan, informing him that the U.S. would not support Pakistani military action. He convinced Pakistan to step back from hostilities and to disband the Kashmiri training camps in its territory.

=== Nuclear policy ===
After Bhutto became prime minister, President Khan and the military were reluctant to tell her about Pakistan's nuclear program, and it remains unknown how much Bhutto knew about the issue during her first term in office. She later related that to find out more she contacted key scientists in the program, such as A. Q. Khan, herself, bypassing the president and military hierarchy. On her trip to the United States, she told Congress that "we do not possess, nor do we intend to make, a nuclear device". While in Washington D.C., she met with CIA director William Webster, who showed her a mock-up of the Pakistani nuclear weapon and stated his opinion that research the project it had reached a crescendo in the final years of Zia's government. William's revelations came as a shock to Bhutto, who was unaware of how advanced Pakistan's nuclear development had become. The United States wanted to prevent Pakistan from creating such a device, and President George H. W. Bush informed her that U.S. military aid to the country would cease unless Pakistan refrained from producing nuclear bomb cores, the final step in creating the weapon. Between January and March 1989, she authorised cold tests of nuclear weaponry, without fissionable material, although this did not satisfy the military authorities. In 1990, shortly before leaving office, the American ambassador Robert Oakley informed her that information obtained by U.S. satellites indicated that her commitment to not produce weapons-grade uranium had been breached at the Kahuta enrichment plant.

=== Dismissal ===
The ISI organised Operation Midnight Jackal, through which they used bribery and intimidation to discourage National Assembly members from voting with the PPP. By 1990, the revelation of Midnight Jackal lessened President Khan's influence in national politics, government and the military.

In the 1980s, ethnic violence had broken out in Sindh province, with most of those killed being mohajirs. Late in 1989, the MQM—whose party represented mohajir interests—left Bhutto's coalition government. The MQM then joined other voices in calling for a general strike to protest Bhutto's government. In May 1990, she ordered the army to restore peace in Karachi and Hyderabad. Within months of Bhutto's election, dissolution had set in among her liberal supporters. Her narrow majority in the National Assembly had left her unable to reverse many of the Islamist reforms that Zia had introduced. She did not repeal the Hudood Ordinances, which remained in law until 2006. Her opposition to legalised abortion frustrated many Pakistani feminists. Throughout her first term, Bhutto was criticised for being indecisive and unable to maintain control. There had been anger that her husband had been allowed to attend cabinet meetings despite not being a member of the government. He was also accused of receiving kickbacks and gained the nickname "Mr Ten Percent". The ISI had extensively spied upon Bhutto and her husband throughout her period in office, President Khan privately paid plaintiffs to file corruption suits against Bhutto's husband. While the investigations into his corruption were therefore politically motivated, there also was significant evidence of his guilt in this regard.

In 1990, Bhutto gave birth to her first daughter, Bakhtawar.

Tales of corruption in public-sector industries began to surface, which undermined the credibility of Bhutto. The unemployment and labour strikes began to take place which halted and jammed the economic wheel of the country, and Bhutto was unable to solve these issues due to the cold war with the president. In August 1990, Khan dismissed Bhutto's government under the Eighth Amendment of the constitution. He claimed that this was necessary owing to her government's corruption and inability to maintain law and order. A caretaker government under the control of former PPP member Ghulam Mustafa Jatoi was sworn in, with Khan declaring a state of national emergency.

== Leader of the opposition (1990–1993) ==
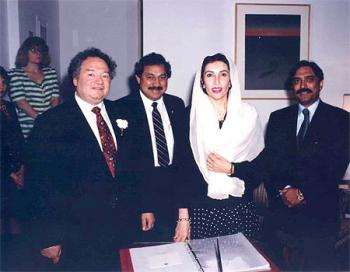
Bhutto with United States congressman Gary Ackerman at his office in Washington, D.C., c. 1990

Khan called for new elections. In the meantime, Bhutto and her husband were forbidden to leave Pakistan, although they purchased an apartment in Queen's Gate, in the South Kensington area of London. In October, Zardari was arrested on charges of extortion. According to the allegations, he had attached a remote-control bomb to the leg of a businessman and forced the latter to enter a bank and withdraw money. He was convicted and remained in prison for three years.

In the 1990 general election, the PPP only secured 45 of the 217 seats. The IJI, under the leadership of Nawaz Sharif, won a majority in the Parliament, and Sharif became prime minister. Bhutto became the leader of the opposition. From this position she attacked Sharif's every policy, highlighting his government's failings in dealing with Pakistan's problems of poverty, unemployment, and lack of healthcare, although not also discussing her own administration's failures on those same issues. To journalists she remained unrepentant about her period in office, insisting that she had made no mistakes. She subsequently also accused Sharif of backing the Salafi jihadist militant group al-Qaeda, established by bin Laden. Following the assassination of Rajiv Gandhi in May 1991, Bhutto visited India to attend his funeral.

As dissatisfaction with Sharif's government grew, the PPP began to restore the support it had lost during Bhutto's premiership. Encouraging public protests, in November 1992, she organised a 10-mile march from Rawalpindi to Islamabad in protest at the IJI government. Sharif ordered her to be placed under house arrest to prevent her instigating any uprisings.

Despite an economic recovery in late 1993, the IJI government faced public unease about the direction of the country and industrialisation that revolved around and centered only in Punjab Province. Amid protest and civil disorder in Sindh Province following the imposition of Operation Clean-up, the IDA government lost control of the province. The Peoples Party attacked the IDA government's record on unemployment and industrial racism.

Sharif had attempted to reduce the president's powers. Relations between Sharif and President Khan also soured and the prime minister came under pressure to resign from the armed forces. With growing tensions between him and President Khan, in April 1993 the latter used the Eighth Amendment to dismiss Sharif as prime minister, citing corruption and misadministration. An agreement was reached whereby both Sharif and Khan would step down. The military formed an interim government and called a general election for October 1993. Their policies were very similar but a clash of personalities occurred, with both parties making many promises but not explaining how they were going to pay for them. Bhutto promised price supports for agriculture, pledged a partnership between government and business, and campaigned strongly for the female vote.

In February 1993, Bhutto gave birth to her daughter, Asifa. That year, she also declared herself chair of the PPP for life. This move reflected the lack of internal democracy within the party, which was increasingly referred to as the "Bhutto Family Party" (BFP). During her campaign for the 1993 general election, the Salafi jihadist Ramzi Yousef unsuccessfully attempted to assassinate her twice. Yousef went on to play a role in the 1993 World Trade Center bombing in the U.S.

== Second premiership (1993–1996) ==
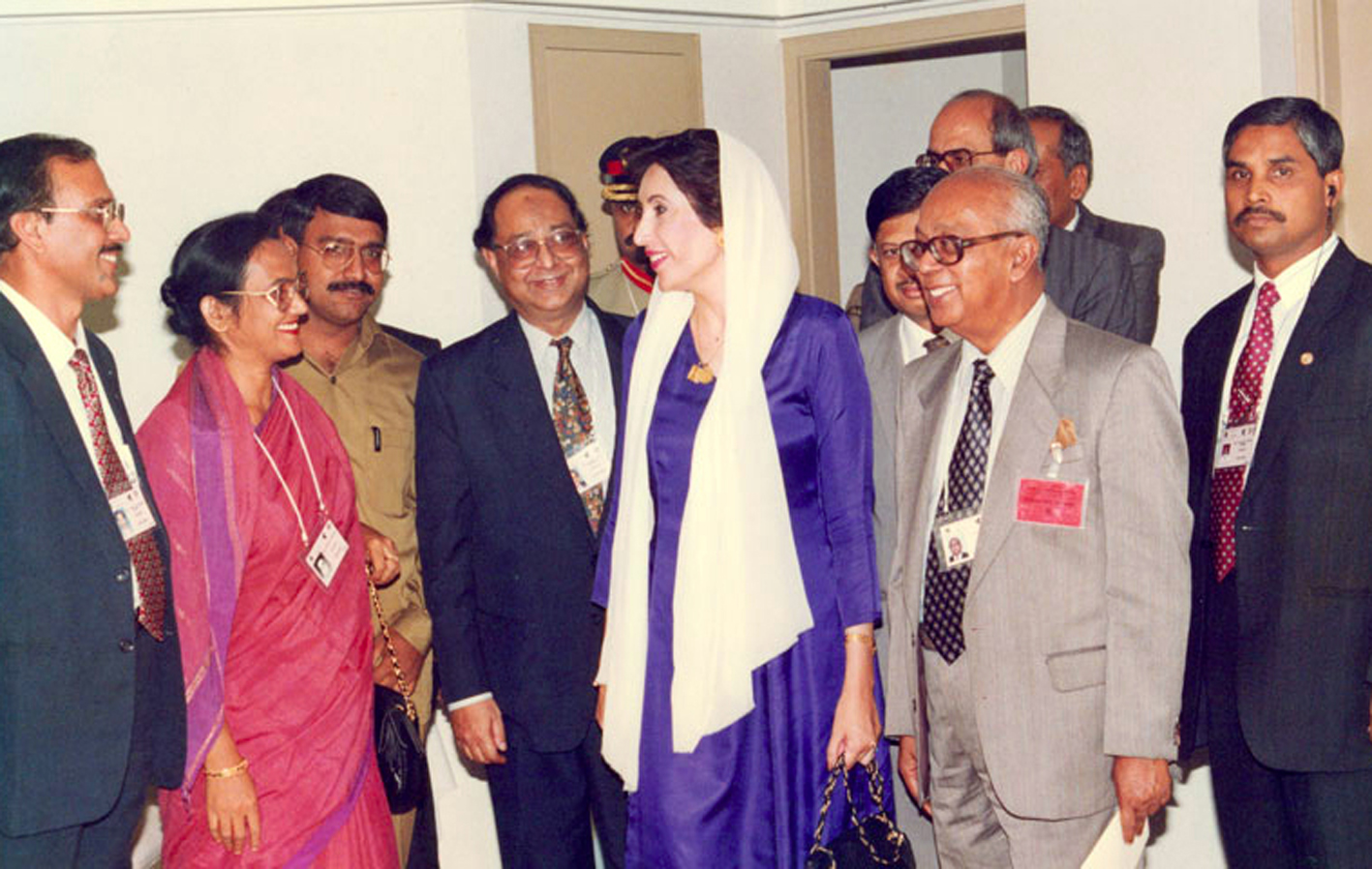
Bhutto at the 1993 meeting of the Organisation of Islamic Cooperation in Cyprus

In the October 1993 general election, the PPP won the most seats, although it fell short of an outright majority, with 86 seats. Sharif's new party, the Pakistan Muslim League (Nawaz), came second with 73 seats. The PPP performed extremely well in Bhutto's native province, Sindh, and rural Punjab, while the PML-N was strongest in industrial Punjab and the largest cities such as Karachi, Lahore and Rawalpindi. Bhutto was again prime minister, but this time had a weaker parliamentary mandate than she had had in 1988. She was officially sworn in on 19 October 1993.

Realising the threat to her premiership posed by an unsympathetic president, Bhutto ensured that a PPP member, Farooq Leghari, was nominated and duly elected to the presidency in November. Zardari was freed from prison after Bhutto returned to office in 1993. During her second term, Bhutto appointed both her husband and mother to her cabinet. The former was appointed investment minister, chief of the Intelligence Bureau, director-general of the Federal Investigation Agency, and chair of the new Environment Protection Council. She gave him a monopoly on the country's gold imports, a post that earned him $10 million, which he deposited in an Indian bank. Allen suggested that measures like these reflected how Bhutto had "given up on all her previous ideals and simply caved into the culture of corruption—indeed excelled in it, as she had excelled in so many other areas".

John Burns, a journalist from The New York Times, investigated the business transactions of Bhutto and her husband, exposing the scale of their corruption. By 1996, their takings through these various deals were estimated at $1.5 billion. A subsequent inquiry by Pakistan's Accountability Bureau found that in that year, Bhutto, her husband, and her mother only declared assets totaling $1.2 million, leaving out the extensive foreign accounts and properties that they possessed. Despite their significant earnings, the couple did not pay the amount of tax owed; between 1993 and 1994, Bhutto paid no income tax at all. In 1996, Transparency International ranked Pakistan as the world's second most corrupt country.

Bhutto ordered the construction of a new residence in Islamabad; it covered 110 acres of ground and cost $50 million to construct. In 1993, Bhutto declared that her family burial ground would be converted into an official mausoleum and would undergo significant expansion. She dropped the first architect she employed to do the job after deciding that she wanted a more Islamic design; she replaced him with Waqar Akbar Rizvi, instructing him to visit the tombs of Mustafa Kemal Atatürk and Ruhollah Khomeini for inspiration. In 1995, Zardari purchased a fifteen-bedroom country house at Rockwood in Surrey, southern England; to hide evidence of ownership, he obtained the property through companies based in the Isle of Man. She spent much of her second term abroad, making 24 foreign trips during its first twelve months.

=== Domestic and foreign policy ===
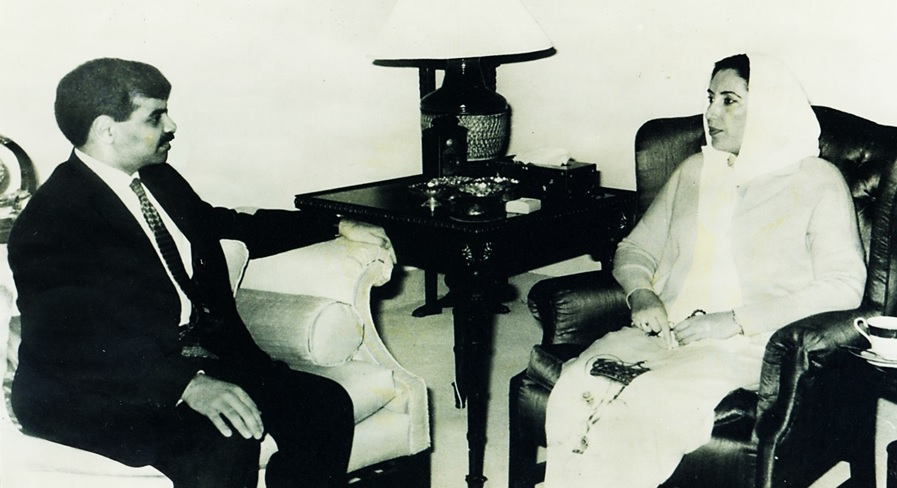
Bhutto with venture financier and hedge-fund manager Mansoor Ijaz, at the Prime Minister House, December 1995

The PPP Government made dramatic reforms in women's rights. I appointed several women to my cabinet and established a Ministry of Women's Development. We created women's studies programs in universities. We established a Women's Development Bank to give credit only to enterprising women... And we legalized and encouraged women's participation in international sports, which had been banned in the years of the Zia military dictatorship. It was a solid start in a society where Islam had been exploited to repress the position of women in society for a bitter generation.

— Bhutto on the women's rights advances of her government

Seeking to advance women's rights, in her second term Bhutto signed Pakistan to the international Convention on the Elimination of All Forms of Discrimination Against Women. She was also a founding member of the Council of Women World Leaders, a group established in 1996. Bhutto oversaw the creation of a women's division in the government, headed by a senior female civil servant, as well as a women's bank. She opened a series of all-female police stations, staffed with female officers, to make women feel safer in coming forward to report crimes. She established family courts with female judges to deal with child custody and family issues, and in 1994–95 the first women judges were appointed to the Supreme Courts of Peshawar and Sindh. The fundamentalist Islamic laws introduced to restrict women's rights under Zia nevertheless remained in place; her failure to remove the hudood ordinances brought criticism from liberal circles and damaged her relations with women's and human rights groups.

Bhutto stated that once back in the office, she asked for reasons why the Kahuta enrichment plant had broken her command by producing weapons-grade uranium and implemented a new system of security at the plant to provide greater oversight of the facility's scientists. Both the military and ISI, however, supported the development of material that could produce viable nuclear weaponry. India had developed the Agni missile a system which would allow the country to strike all of Pakistan's major cities, and as a counter, many in the Pakistani administration believed that they needed an equivalent launch pad system for their nuclear warheads. They decided to make a deal with the North Korean government, exchanging information about enrichment for missile technology. Bhutto later claimed that on her 1993 visit to North Korea, she secretly carried a computer CD containing nuclear data, although she subsequently retracted this claim. Bhutto also made a state visit to the U.S. in 1995, where she convinced Congress to repeal sanctions that they had imposed on Pakistan over its nuclear weapons programme in 1990.

In September 1996, the Taliban secured power in Afghanistan. Bhutto's government was one of only three countries to recognise it as the legitimate Afghan government, a move that further distanced it from its Western allies. The Taliban's rise coincided with a broader growth in opposition to Bhutto from Salafi Islamist groups. Increasingly, there were Salafist protests against Bhutto in countries other than Pakistan. During a trip to London, Bhutto faced Islamist protests outside the Dorchester Hotel, where she was staying. Speaking to UK prime minister John Major, she highlighted this protest as evidence for the growth of Salafi ideology in Britain, commenting that it would generate problems for Western countries in future.

Bhutto was Prime Minister at a time of great racial tension in Pakistan. Ethnic violence had broken out in Sindh as muhajir—mobilised by the MQM—rioted in protest at what they saw as their poor treatment. Abductions, bombings, and murders became increasingly common in Karachi. To deal with the unrest, Bhutto permitted her interior minister, Naseerullah Babar, to launch Operation Blue Fox, a violent crackdown on the MQM. By the time that the Operation was officially completed, the government announced that 3,000 had been killed in Karachi, although the number may have been far larger. An Amnesty International report commented that while Bhutto had declared that her government would end human rights abuses, the use of torture, rape, and extrajudicial killings remained common in Pakistani prisons.

Sharif had been a proponent of laissez faire economics and his government had promoted privatisation. During her second term, Bhutto also became increasingly open about her support for such an economic policy, pursuing broadly similar approaches to those of Sharif. Her second term therefore witnessed a liberal approach to economics and the privatisation of industrial plants. Pakistan saw a record $20 billion of foreign investment during this term, largely in the power industry. The country also entered the list of the world's top ten developing capital markets. There were far fewer public hopes regarding the second Bhutto premiership than there had been for the first. The country's financial situation left no funds for her to pursue the desired social programs; 70% of national revenues went on paying off the national debt, while much of the other 30% went on the military, which would not tolerate cuts to its budget. The 1990s had seen severe economic problems for Pakistan; the country's economic growth had declined to between 3 and 4%, poverty rose to 33%, and the percentage of households living in absolute poverty doubled. With rapidly growing inflation and higher taxes, there was growing discontent over Pakistan's economic situation. The announcement of the 1995 budget was met with strikes and demonstrations.

=== Relations with Murtaza ===
As many PPP members became increasingly dissatisfied with Bhutto during the 1990s, they referred to her brother Mir Murtaza, still in exile, as Zulfikar's true heir. From Syria, Murtaza campaigned as an independent candidate for Larkana in the Sindh Legislative Assembly election of 1993. Bhutto did not want him to join the PPP, fearing him as a potential challenger to her leadership of the party, however his mother Nusrat campaigned for him, helping him win the election. Having won, he flew back to Pakistan in November to take up his new position. Around ninety criminal charges had been brought against him under Zia's regime, so on arrival, Murtaza was arrested and held for eight months in solitary confinement. Suvorova suggested that Bhutto had allowed this as a concession to those, including President Leghari and the Sindhi Chief Minister Syed Abdullah Ali Shah, who insisted that Murtaza face criminal proceedings for his militant activities. Murtaza maintained that it was he, rather than his sister, who was the standard-bearer for their father's championing of the downtrodden. He espoused a socialist platform different from his sister's and called for internal elections within the PPP, which could have resulted in the removal of Bhutto. Animosity grew between the two siblings.

In June 1994, Murtaza was released on bail, and at his subsequent trial he was acquitted of all charges. In 1995, he established his own party, the PPP (Shaheed Bhutto); the party's name implied that he was closer to the Bhutto's family's Shaheed than his sister, whom he symbolically distanced from the family by referring to her as "Begum Zardari". Murtaza focused much of his criticism on Bhutto's husband Zardari, whom he blamed of being responsible for government corruption. He hung a picture of Zardari up in the guest toilet of his house as an act of disrespect to his brother-in-law. A rumour spread that in one incident, Murtaza invited Zardari to his house, only to have him pinned down by bodyguards and half his mustache forcibly shaved off. Nusrat continued to support Murtaza, damaging her relationship with Bhutto; mother and daughter increasingly criticised one another. Bhutto was so angry with her mother's actions that she ousted her as co-chair of the PPP. This angered Nusrat, who told The New York Times, "She's talked a lot about democracy, but she's become a little dictator."

On 20 September 1996, Murtaza was ambushed by police near Karachi; they opened fire, killing him and seven others. All witnesses were taken into police custody, where two of them died. It was widely believed in Pakistan that the killing had been ordered by a senior government figure; Murtaza's supporters thought that Bhutto and her husband were responsible. When Bhutto tried to attend her brother's funeral in Larkana, local Murtaza supporters pelted her car with rocks. At the funeral, Nusrat—who had the early stages of Alzheimer's disease—also blamed Bhutto for her brother's death. Bhutto initially blamed the killing on a conspiracy against her family; she suggested that President Leghari had been involved, in an act designed to destabilise her government. She brought in Scotland Yard to investigate, partly to quell rumors that she had ordered the killing, although the case remained unsolved. After Murtaza's death, Bhutto re-established a relationship with her mother.

=== Domestic affairs ===
Her approval poll rose by 38% after she appeared and said in a private television interview after the elections: "We are unhappy with the manner in which tampered electoral lists were provided in a majority of constituencies; our voters were turned away." The Conservatives attracted voters from religious society (MMA) whose support had collapsed. In confidential official documents Benazir Bhutto had objected to the number of Urdu speaking class in 1993 elections, in the context that she had no Urdu-speaking sentiment in her circle and discrimination was continued even in her government. Her stance on these issues was perceived as part of rising public disclosure which Altaf Hussain called "racism". Due to Benazir Bhutto's stubbornness and authoritative actions, her political rivals gave her the nickname "Iron Lady" of Pakistan. No response was issued by Bhutto, but she soon associated with the term.

Benazir Bhutto expanded the authoritative rights of Police Combatant Force and the provisional governments that tackled the local opposition aggressively. Bhutto, through her Internal Security Minister Naseerullah Babar, intensified the internal security operations and steps, gradually putting down the opposition's political rallies, while she did not completely abandon the reconciliation policy. In her own worlds, Benazir Bhutto announced: "There was no basis for [strikes] ... in view of the ongoing political process".

=== Economy ===
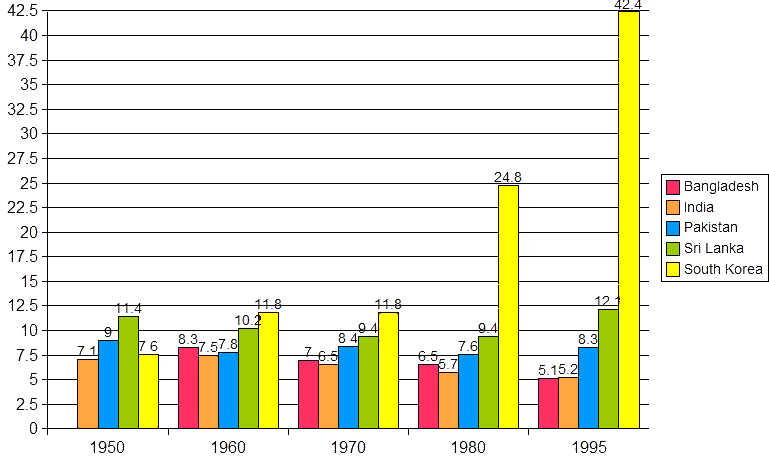
The total GDP per capita as a percentage of the U.S. GDP per capita stood between 8.4% (in the 1970s) and 8.3% (in 1993–96), periods of nationalisation

Bhutto was an economist by profession; therefore during her terms as prime minister, she herself took charge of the Ministry of Finance. Bhutto sought to improve the country's declining economy. She disagreed with her father's nationalisation and socialist economics. Soon after the collapse of the Soviet Union, Benazir attempted to privatise major industries that had been nationalised in the 1970s. Bhutto promised to end the nationalisation programme and to carry out the industrialisation programme by means other than state intervention; however, Bhutto did not carry out the denationalisation program or liberalisation of the economy during her first government. No nationalised units were privatised and few economic regulations were reviewed.

Pakistan suffered a currency crisis when the government failed to arrest the 30% fall in the value of the Pakistani Rupee from ₨. 21 to ₨.30 per U.S. dollar. Soon economic progress became her top priority but her investment and industrialisation programs faced major setbacks due to conceptions formed by investors based upon her People's Party nationalisation program in the 1970s. By the 1990s, Khan and Bhutto's government had also ultimately lost the currency war with the Indian Rupee which beat the value of Pakistan rupee for the first time in the 1970s. Bhutto's denationalisation program also suffered from many political setbacks, as many of her government members were either directly or indirectly involved with the government corruption in major government-owned industries, and her appointed government members allegedly sabotaged her efforts to privatise the industries.

Overall, the living standard for people in Pakistan declined as inflation and unemployment grew at an exponential rate particularly as UN sanctions began to take effect. During her first and second term, the difference between rich and poor visibly increased and the middle class in particular were the ones who bore the brunt of the economic inequality. According to a calculation completed by the Federal Bureau of Statistics, the standard of living for the rich improved while the standard of living for the poor declined. Benazir attributed this economic inequality to be a result of ongoing and continuous illegal Bangladeshi immigration. Bhutto ordered a crackdown on and deportation of illegal Bangladeshi immigrants. Her action strained and created tensions in Bangladesh–Pakistan relations, as Bangladesh Prime Minister Khaleda Zia refused to accept the deportees and reportedly sent two planeloads back to Pakistan. Religious parties also criticised Bhutto and dubbed the crackdown as anti-Islamic.

This operation backfired and had devastating effects on Pakistan's economy. President Khan saw this as a major economic failure despite Khan's permission granted to Bhutto for the approval of her economic policies. Khan blamed Bhutto for this extensive economic slowdown and her policy that failed to stop the illegal immigration. Khan attributed Bhutto's government members corruption in government-owned industries as the major sinkhole in Pakistan's economy that failed to compete with neighboring India's economy.

==== Privatisation and era of stagflation ====
The GDP growth rate was at ~4.37% in 1993, which fell to ~1.70% in 1996, before Bhutto's dismissal.

During her second term, Bhutto continued to follow former prime minister Nawaz Sharif's privatisation policies, which she called a "disciplined macroeconomics policy". After the 1993 general elections, the privatisation programme of state-owned banks and utilities accelerated; more than ₨ 42 billion was raised from the sale of nationalised corporations and industries, and another US$20 billion from the foreign investment made the United States. After 1993, the country's national economy again entered in the second period of the stagflation and more roughly began bite the country's financial resources and the financial capital. Bhutto's second government found it extremely difficult to counter the second era of stagflation with Pressler amendment and the US financial and military embargo tightened its position. After a year of study, Bhutto implemented and enforced the Eighth Plan to overcome the stagflation by creating a dependable and effective mechanism for accelerating economic and social progress. But, according to American ambassador to Pakistan, William Milam's bibliography, Bangladesh and Pakistan: Flirting with Failure in South Asia, the Eighth Plan (which reflected the planned economy of the Soviet Union) was doomed to meet with failure from the very beginning of 1994, as the policies were weak and incoherent.

On many occasions, Bhutto resisted to privatise globally competitive and billion-dollar-worth state-owned enterprises (such as Pakistan Railways and Pakistan Steel Mills), instead the grip of nationalisation in those state-owned enterprises was tightened in order to secure the capital investment of these industries. The process of privatisation of the nationalised industries was associated with the marked performance and improvement, especially the terms of labour productivity. A number of privatisation of industries such as gas, water supply and sanitation, and electricity general, were natural monopolies for which the privatisation involved little competition. Furthermore, Bhutto denied that privatisation of the Pakistan Railways would take place despite the calls made in Pakistan. Bhutto always resisted privatisation of United Bank Limited Pakistan (UBL), but its management sent the recommendation for the privatisation which dismayed the labour union. The United Group of Employees Management asked Bhutto for the issue of the regulation sheet which she denied. The holding of UBL in government control turned out to be a move that ended in "disaster" for Bhutto's government.

=== Foreign policy ===
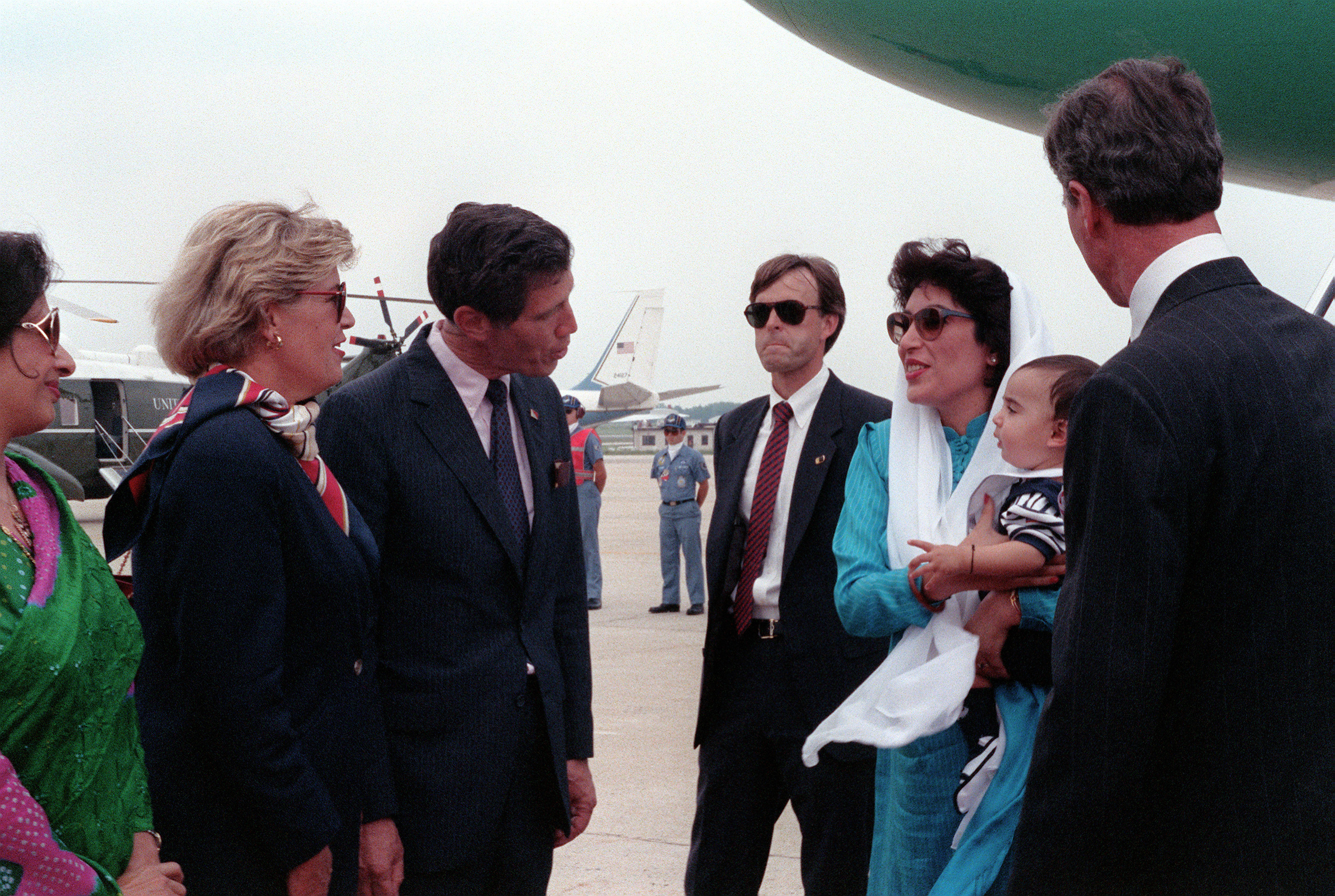
Bhutto in the United States, 1989

Major-General Pervez Musharraf worked closely with Bhutto and her government in formulating an Israel strategy. In 1993 Bhutto ordered Musharraf, then director-general of the Pakistani Army's Directorate-General for the Military Operation (DGMO), to join her state visit to the United States, unusual and unconventional participation. Bhutto and Musharraf chaired a secret meeting with Israeli officials who traveled to the US especially for the meeting. Under Bhutto's guidance Musharraf intensified the ISI's liaison with Israel's Mossad. A final meeting took place in 1995, which Musharraf also joined. Bhutto also strengthened relations with its most important partner communist China, and repeatedly visited Beijing for mutual trade and international political co-operation the two countries. In 1995, Benazir Bhutto made another state visit to the United States and held talks with U.S. president Bill Clinton. Bhutto urged him to revise the Pressler Amendment and launch a campaign against extremism. She criticised US nonproliferation policy and demanded that the United States honor its contractual obligation.

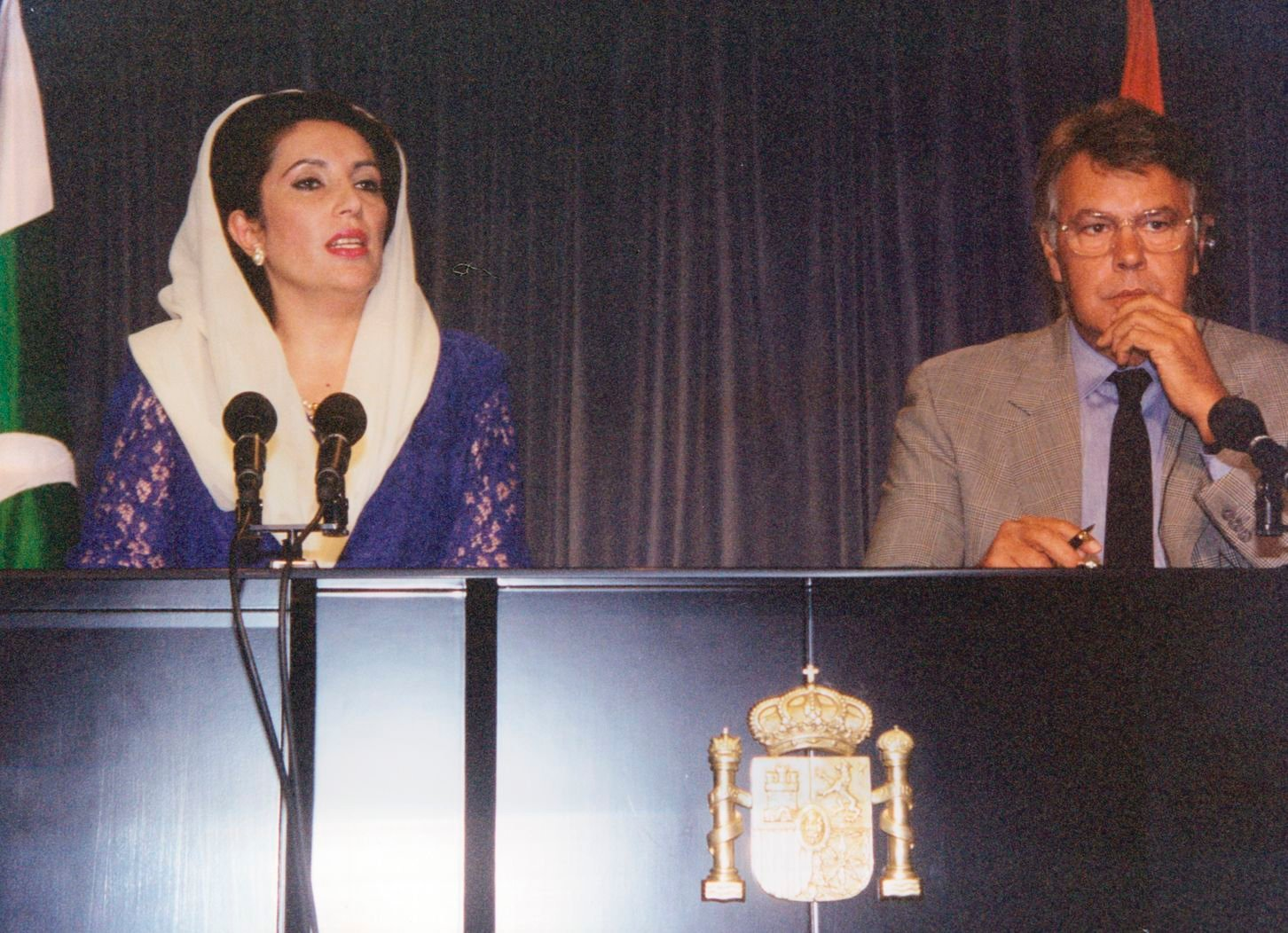
Bhutto with Spanish Prime Minister Felipe González during her 1994 visit to Spain

During her second term, relations with Indian prime minister P. V. Narasimha Rao further deteriorated. Like her father, Benazir Bhutto used rhetoric to oppose India and campaign in the international community against the Indian nuclear program. On 1 May 1995, she used harsh language in her public warning to India that "continuation of [Indian] nuclear program would have terrible consequences". India responded to this saying she was interfering in an "internal matter" of India, and the Indian Army fired a RPG at the Kahuta, which further escalated events, leading to full-fledged war. When this news reached Bhutto, she responded by high-alerting the Air Force Strategic Command. It ordered heavily armed Arrows, Griffins, Black Panthers and the Black Spiders to begin air sorties and to patrol the Indo-Pakistan border on day-and-night regular missions. All of these squadrons are part of the Strategic Command. On 30 May, India test-fired a Prithvi-1 missile near the Pakistan border, which Bhutto condemned. She responded by deploying Shaheen-I missiles; however, they were not armed. Benazir Bhutto permitted the PAF to deploy the Crotale missile defence and the Anza-Mk-III near the Indian border, which escalated the conflict, but effectively kept the Indian Army and the Indian Air Force from launching any surprise attack.

In 1995, the ISI reported to Bhutto that Narasimha Rao had authorised nuclear tests and that they could be conducted at any minute. Benazir put the country's nuclear arsenal programme on high-alert made emergency preparations, and ordered the Pakistani armed forces to remain on high-alert. However the United States intervened, Indian operations for conducting the nuclear tests were called off and the Japanese government attempted to mediate. In 1996, Benazir Bhutto met with Japanese officials and warned India about conducting nuclear tests. She revealed for the first time that Pakistan had achieved parity with India in its capacity to produce nuclear weapons and their delivery capability. She told the Indian press, that Pakistan "cannot afford to negate the parity we maintain with India". These statements represented a departure from Pakistan's previous policy of "nuclear ambivalence". Bhutto issued a statement on the tests and told the international press that she condemned the Indian nuclear tests. "If [India] conducts a nuclear test, it would force her [Pakistan] to ... follow suit", she said.

Bhutto also ratcheted up her policy on Indian Kashmir, rallying against India. At an Inter-Parliamentary Union meeting at the United Nations, Bhutto, who was accompanied by her Speaker Yousaf Raza Gillani upset and angered the Indian delegation, headed by prime minister Atal Bihari Vajpayee, with vehement criticism of India. Vajpayee responded, saying: "It is Pakistan which is flouting the United Nations resolution by not withdrawing its forces from Kashmir ... You people create problems every time. You know the Kashmiri people themselves acceded to India. First, the Maharajah, then the Kashmiri parliament, both decided to go with India".

=== Relations with military ===
During her second term, Benazir Bhutto's relations with the Pakistan Armed Forces took a different and pro-Bhutto approach, when she carefully appointed General Abdul Waheed Kakar as the chief of Army Staff. General Abdul Waheed was an uptight, strict, and a professional officer with a view of Westernised democracy. Benazir also appointed Admiral Saeed Mohammad Khan as Chief of Naval Staff; General Abbas Khattak as Chief of Air Staff. Whilst, Air Chief Marshal Farooq Feroze Khan was appointed chairman Joint Chiefs who was the first (and to date only) Pakistani air officer to have reached to such 4 stars assignment. Benazir Bhutto enjoyed strong relations with the Pakistan Armed Forces, and president who was hand-picked by her did not question her authority. She hand-picked officers and promoted them based on their pro-democracy views while the president gave constitutional authorisation for their promotion. The senior military leadership including Jehangir Karamat, Musharraf, Kayani, Ali Kuli Khan, Farooq Feroze Khan, Abbas Khattak and Fasih Bokhari, had strong Western-democratic views and were generally close to Bhutto as they had resisted Nawaz Sharif's conservatism. Unlike Nawaz Sharif's second democratic term, Benazir worked with the military on many issues where the military disagreement, solving many problems relating directly to civil-military relations. Her tough and hardline policies on Afghanistan, Kashmir, and India, which the military had backed Benazir Bhutto staunchly.

After the assassination was attempted, Benazir Bhutto's civilian security team headed under Rehman Malik, was disbanded by the Pakistan Army whose X-Corps' 111th Psychological Brigade— an army brigade tasked with countering the psychological warfare— took control of the security of Benazir Bhutto, that directly reported to Chief of Army Staff and the prime minister. Benazir Bhutto ordered General Abdul Waheed Kakar and the lieutenant-general Javed Ashraf Qazi director-general of ISI, to start a sting and manhunt operation to hunt down the ringmaster, Ramzi Yousef. After few arrests and intensive manhunt search, the ISI finally captured Ramzi before he could flee the country. In a matter of weeks, Ramzi was secretly extradited to the United States, while the ISI managed to kill or apprehend all the culprits behind the plot. In 1995, she personally appointed General Naseem Rana as the director-general of the ISI, who later commanded the Pakistan Army's assets in which came to known as "Pakistan's secret war in Afghanistan". During this course, General Rana directly reported to the prime minister and led the intelligence operations after which were approved by Benazir Bhutto. In 1995, Benazir also appointed Admiral Mansurul Haq as the chief of Naval Staff, as the admiral had personal contacts with the Benazir's family. However, it was the admiral's large-scale corruption, sponsored by her husband Asif Zardari, that shrunk the credibility of Benazir Bhutto by the end of 1996 that led to the end of her government after all.

=== Dismissal ===
Relations between Bhutto and Leghari had declined after she suggested he had been involved in her brother's murder. Leghari sought the backing of the Army Chief, Karamat, to move against her premiership. Leghari warned Bhutto that he would dismiss her government unless she introduced measures to curtail corruption and deal with the economic crisis. In response, she gave up her role as Minister of Finances and dismissed most of her economic advisers in October 1996. She nevertheless maintained that the country's economic problems were the fault of Sharif's previous administration. Citing the eighth amendment of the Constitution, on 5 November, Leghari dismissed Bhutto's government on the grounds of corruption and incompetence. He added the suspicion that Bhutto had been involved in her brother's death. Troops surrounded Bhutto's residence, while Zardari tried to leave the country for Dubai, but was arrested and imprisoned, charged with money laundering and involvement in Murtaza's murder. He remained in prison until 2004.

Leghari installed a civilian caretaker government led by Malik Meraj Khalid while announcing forthcoming elections for February 1997. Bhutto challenged the constitutionality of Leghari's decision, taking the issue to the Supreme Court, but they ruled in agreement with the president in January in a 6–1 ruling. The Supreme Court's decision also resulted in the removal of all pro-Bhutto elements from the military. In the ensuing election, which took place in February 1997, Sharif was re-elected. The PPP had secured only 18 seats in the National Assembly. Some Pakistani feminist groups had refused to back Bhutto's re-election because, despite her repeated promises, she had not removed the hudud ordinances that Zia's administration had introduced.

== Leader of the Opposition (1996–1999) ==
Newly re-elected, Sharif moved quickly to curtail the powers of the presidency and judiciary. He removed the constitution's Eighth Amendment which had been used by successive presidents to oust both Bhutto and himself from office. Sharif also launched judicial proceedings against Bhutto. In 1998, India tested its first nuclear weapon; Bhutto responded with an editorial for the Los Angeles Times in which she argued that the international community should go further than imposing economic sanctions on India, but should launch a preemptive bomb strike on India's nuclear facilities. She called on Sharif to retaliate with a series of Pakistani military tests. After Sharif's government did so, Bhutto called for Pakistan to sign the Comprehensive Nuclear-Test-Ban Treaty and arrive at a bilateral agreement on nuclear proliferation with India. Tensions between India and Pakistan resulted in the Kargil War of 1999; the conflict humiliated Pakistan both militarily and politically and left the country with a very poor international standing. Bhutto observed the conflict from abroad, describing it as "Pakistan's biggest blunder".

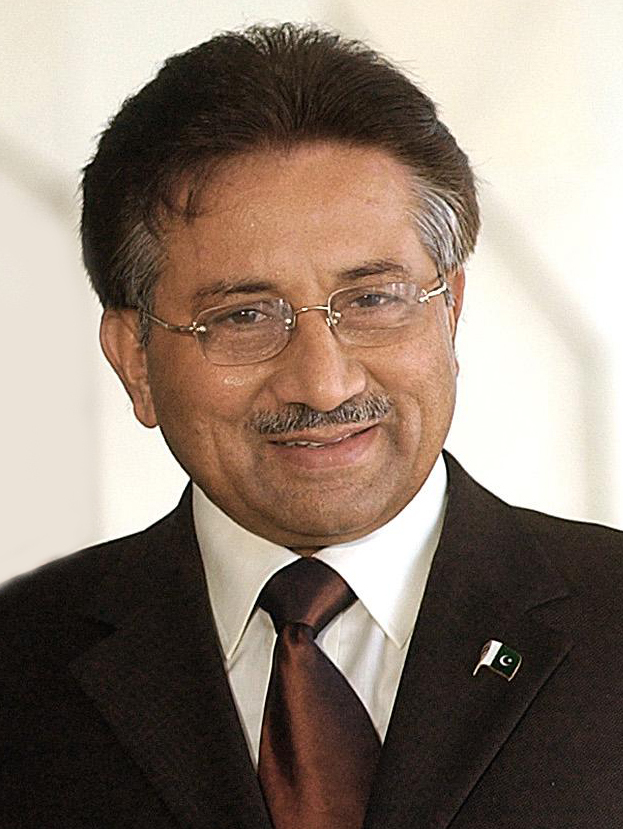
In 1999, Pervez Musharraf launched a military coup and became the country's president.

In April 1999, the Ehtesab Bench of the Lahore High Court convicted Bhutto in absentia, giving her a five years prison sentence, an $8.6 million fine, and disqualifying her from public office. The Pakistani authorities unsuccessfully tried to secure her arrest and extradition through Interpol. Bhutto claimed that this was politically motivated. She was in London at the time of the judgment, and rather than returning to Pakistan she relocated to Dubai. She decided on Dubai because Zayed bin Sultan Al Nahyan, the President of the United Arab Emirates, had been a longstanding friend of her family. She brought her mother and three children to live there with her, settling into a villa in the Emirates Hills given to her by the Emirati government. She claimed that were she to return to Pakistan then she would be imprisoned and then murdered.

She remained in Dubai for eight years, for five of which her husband remained imprisoned in Pakistan. She remained head of the PPP, and spent much of her time in exile fighting the corruption charges that were being brought against her and her husband. Two years later a retrial was ordered after it was ascertained that undue political bias was exerted on the judges. Bhutto also campaigned for Zardari's release from prison. Some of her close political advisers suggested that she abandon him for the sake of her political career, but she refused. While in Dubai, she also focused on raising her children and caring for her mother, whose Alzheimer's disease had progressed to a severe stage.

In October 1999, the chair of the Joint Chiefs of Staff, Pervez Musharraf, launched a military coup which ousted Sharif from power. Bhutto called the coup "disturbing" and "distressing" but noted that it had got rid of Sharif, "an unpopular despot who was hounding the press, the judiciary, the opposition, the foreign investors." She called on Western countries to push for a return to electoral democracy in Pakistan. Musharraf stated that both Sharif and Bhutto had "misgoverned the country" and had failed to allow internal democracy within their own parties, pointing to Bhutto's appointment as chair for life of the PPP, something he compared to "the old African dictators".

In April 2000, Sharif was convicted of treason and sentenced to life imprisonment. At the request of the Saudi monarch, Sharif was released from prison after a year and exiled to Saudi Arabia; he was also disqualified from holding public office. In 2002, Musharraf amended the constitution to ban anyone serving more than two terms as prime minister, thus disqualifying both Bhutto and Sharif, whom he called "useless politicians". Musharraf also consolidated power around himself; in June 2001 he appointed himself to the presidency, holding this position alongside his positions as chief executive and chief of the army staff. He talked about the need for a return to democracy and to respect human rights. He was a secularist and repealed the Hudood Ordinances, an achievement Bhutto had been unable to make. In an April 2002 referendum, Musharraf extended his presidential mandate for a further five years. Bhutto expressed concern that with mainstream politicians removed from Pakistan's political arena, the vacuum would be filled by Islamist extremists.

She was in Dubai while the PPP contested the October 2002 general election; it received the largest number of votes but only 63 seats in the National Assembly. Musharraf agreed to release Zardari in November 2004 as a symbol of good will; following his release, Zardari travelled to New York for medical treatment. Bhutto flew to New York roughly every three weeks to visit him. The couple did not officially acknowledge it, but their relationship was essentially over. Figures in the PPP alleged that Musharraf held a longstanding animosity towards Bhutto and her family because, under her father, Musharraf's father had been sacked from his position, accused of involvement in a scam.

=== Charges of corruption ===
In June 1997, the Pakistani government formally requested that the Swiss government review bank accounts owned by Bhutto and her husband. In 1998, a Swiss magistrate, Daniel Devaud, seized a safe-deposit box containing a $190,000 necklace that Bhutto had purchased in London's Bond Street the previous year. Over the following six years, he investigated how Bhutto had obtained the money used to buy this item. His investigations were followed by a BBC documentary team led by Owen Bennett-Jones. Devaud's investigations revealed a range of corrupt deals that Zardari had been involved with. It was discovered that Dassault, a French aircraft manufacturer, had agreed to pay Zardari and another Pakistani man $200 million to ensure he would facilitate a $4 billion sales of fighter jets. It was also revealed that in both Bhutto and Zardari had taken approximately $15 million in exchange for awarding a customs contract to the Swiss firms SGS/Cotecna when she was prime minister. Devaud concluded that Bhutto "knew she was acting in a criminally reprehensible manner by abusing her role in order to obtain for herself and for her husband considerable sums in the interest of her family at the cost of the Islamic Republic of Pakistan".

Benazir Bhutto was embroiled in a number of cases being pursued by Nawaz Sharif's government in 1997. She termed those cases as a part of Sharif's plan to eliminate her from politics. In an effort to challenge Sharif government's "ehtesab drive", Ms Bhutto along with other PPP leaders visited the Ehtesab Commission, Islamabad, where she handed over corruption references against then PM Nawaz Sharif and his brother Shehbaz Sharif to Abdul Jaleel, Director Special Enquiries at the Ehtesab Commission. These references contained charges of corruptions against Sharif family and Saif-ur-Rehman who was a close aide of Nawaz Sharif. Ms Bhutto gave full statements of facts of complaints. In 1998, Switzerland issued a request for the arrest of Bhutto on suspicion of money laundering. The Geneva City Court subsequently charged Zardari in absentia with laundering money and taking bribes of $15 million from SGS and Cotecna. A Swiss court ordered her to turn over $11.9 million to the Pakistani state and to serve 180 days in prison. 17 Swiss bank accounts owned by the Zardari-Bhutto family were frozen by the country's government. In 2004, a UK court ruled that Rockwood Estate in Surrey—which Zardari owned, despite his repeated denials—should be sold and the proceeds given to the Pakistani state, who were the rightful owners. Zardari protested, admitting that he owned the property and that he should receive the proceeds of its sale.

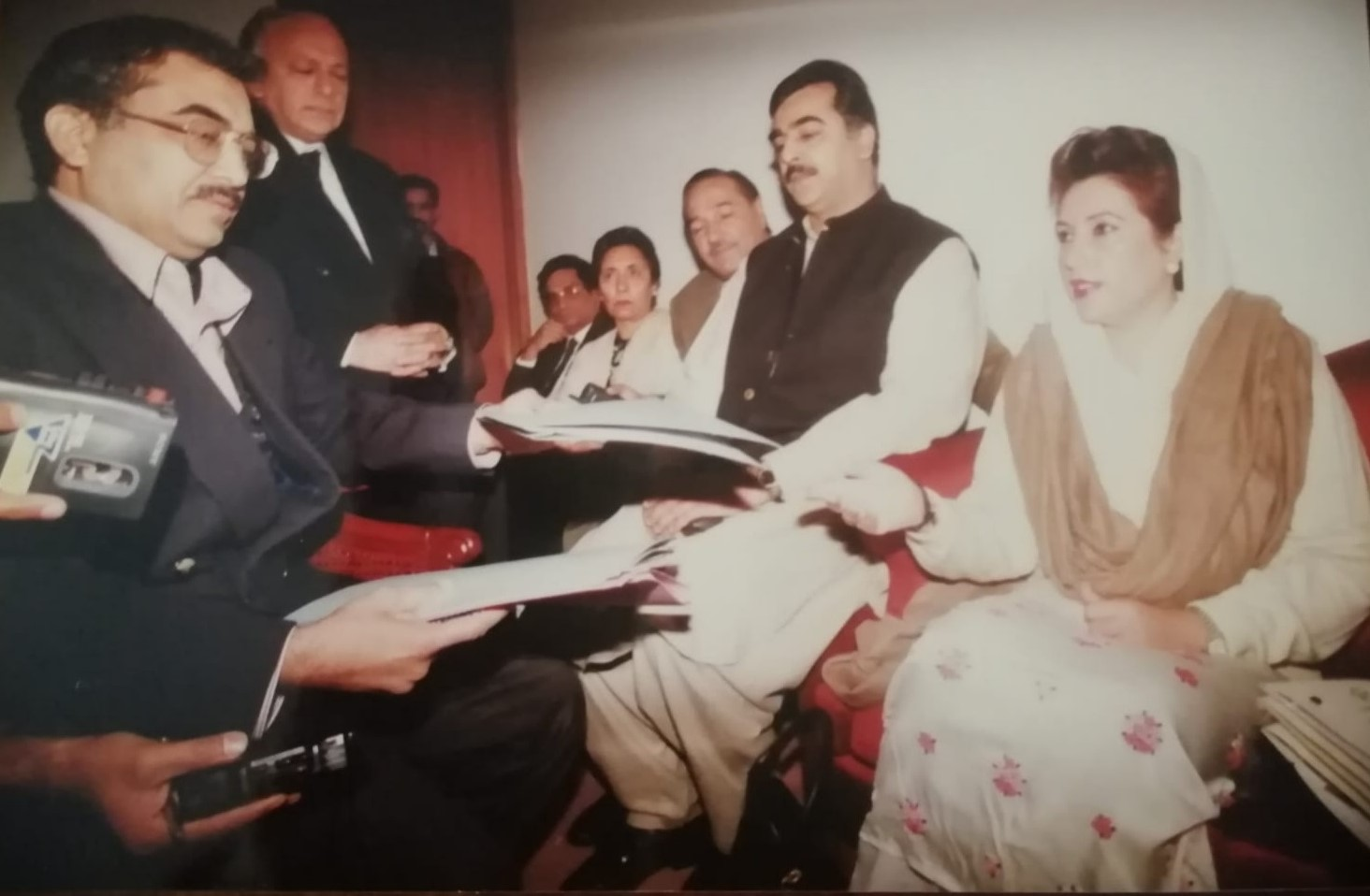
Benazir Bhutto handing over corruption references against Nawaz Sharif and Shehbaz Sharif to Abdul Jaleel, Director Special Enquiries at the Ehtesab Commission, Islamabad, 1997

Through a spokesman, Bhutto said that the charges against her represented a witch hunt and compared them to McCarthyism. She expressed bemusement as to why many thought her spending was lavish: "I mean, what is poor and what is rich? If you mean, am I rich by European standards, do I have a billion dollars, or even a hundred million dollars, even half that, no, I do not. But if you mean that I'm ordinary rich, yes, my father had three children studying at Harvard as undergraduates at the same time. But this wealth never meant anything to my brothers or me." She maintained that the charges against her and her husband were purely political. Bhutto ignored the summons to travel to Switzerland to serve her sentence. She challenged the court ruling and secured a retrial which overturned the previous ruling. However, Allen commented, "No one seriously suggested that the evidence had been fixed or that Bhutto and Zardari were not thieves on a grand scale."

Bhutto was a client of Mossack Fonseca, whose customer records were disclosed in the Panama Papers leak. 7 September 2001 London law firm Richard Rooney and Co told MF-BVI (Mossack Fonseca British Virgin Islands) to create Petroline International Inc in the British Virgin Islands. Petroline International Inc is owned by Bhutto, her nephew Hassan Ali Jaffery Bhutto, and her aide and head of security Rehman Malik, who later became a senator and Interior Minister in the government of Yousaf Raza Gillani. Mossack Fonseca had declined to do business with Bhutto's first company, similarly named Petrofine FZC, established in Sharjah, United Arab Emirates in 2000. The Petrofine was "politically sensitive", they said, and "declined to accept Mrs. Bhutto as a client". A United Nations committee chaired by former head of the US Federal Reserve, Paul Volcker, concluded in a 2005 investigation into abuses of the oil-for-food program that Petrofine FZC had paid US$2 million to the Iraqi government of Saddam Hussein to obtain US$115–145 million in oil contracts.

In 2006, the Pakistani National Accountability Bureau (NAB) accused Bhutto, Malik and Ali Jaffery of owning Petrofine. Bhutto and the PPP denied this. In April 2006 an NAB court froze assets owned in Pakistan and elsewhere by Bhutto and Zardari. The $1.5 billion in assets were acquired through corrupt practices, the NAB said, and noting that the 1997 Swiss charges of criminal money-laundering were still in litigation. At Pakistan's request, Interpol issued notices—but not arrest warrants—for Bhutto and her husband. On 27 January 2007, she was invited by the United States to speak to President George W. Bush and Congressional and State Department officials.

== Later life ==
=== Negotiating a return to Pakistan ===
The US and UK had supported Musharraf because of his role in assisting their war on terror—especially the War in Afghanistan—but they gradually lost faith in his ability to rule successfully. His domestic popularity was slipping; a mid-2007 poll gave him only a 26% approval rating. In 2007, mass anti-Musharraf protests broke out in what was known as the Lawyers' Movement. Pakistan was also experiencing growing levels of violence from Islamist militants, such as the Siege of Lal Masjid. Official figures held that eight suicide bombings took place in 2006 and 44 in 2007. The US government increasingly saw Bhutto as an important figure who could help to constrain Pakistan's domestic problems. They nevertheless wanted a power-sharing deal and did not want Musharraf removed from power completely, regarding him as a vital ally in their War on Terror.

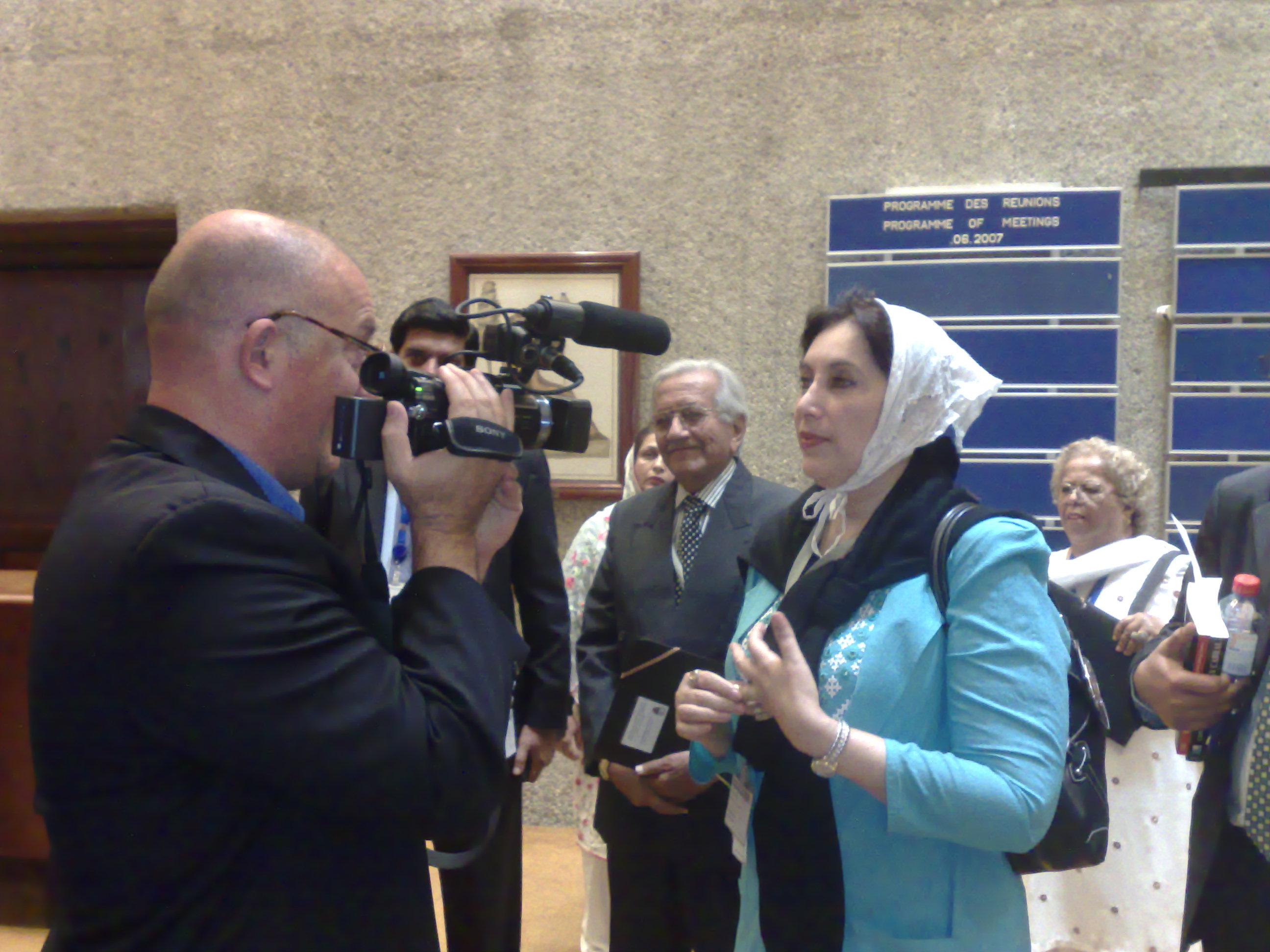
Bhutto being interviewed during the Socialist International meeting in 2007

Assisted by Luis Ayala, the secretary-general of the Socialist International, in 2006 Bhutto and Sharif began a process of reconciliation. Ayala believed that this was a prerequisite for ensuring Pakistan's transition back to democratic elections. Both Bhutto and Sharif had residences in London, not far from one another. Facilitated by the lawyer Aitzaz Ahsan, the pair developed a joint plan of action. In May 2006 they both signed a Charter of Democracy, a document calling for an end to military rule. They established a committee consisting of four Pakistani senators, two from the PPP and two from the Pakistan Muslim League (Nawaz). Henceforth, Bhutto avoided openly criticising Sharif as she once had.

Concerned about the instability of their ally, the US government pushed Musharraf to meet with Bhutto and come to an arrangement that might strengthen his legitimacy. This was also encouraged by the UK government. In January 2007, Musharraf held his first meeting with Bhutto at a hotel in Abu Dhabi, followed by further talks in June. As a result of their discussions, it was agreed that the Pakistani authorities would drop all charges of corruption against both Bhutto and her husband. This was achieved through the introduction of the National Reconciliation Ordinance, a measure which nullified all pending criminal proceedings against politicians. The Ordinance also lifted Musharraf's ban on individuals serving more than two terms as prime minister. It was agreed that if Musharraf stepped down from his military positions and was elected as a civilian president, then Bhutto would be willing to serve under him as prime minister. Many of Musharraf's close allies had reservations about his concessions to Bhutto.

The United States' Condoleezza Rice and the UK's Jack Straw worked together to ensure a transition back to electoral democracy in Pakistan. The UK and Spain both dropped criminal investigations into Bhutto's corruption, although Switzerland refused to do so. In August 2007, the U.S. ambassador to the United Nations, Zalmay Khalizad, had several meetings with Bhutto in New York City. There, Bhutto also gave a public talk at the Council of Foreign Relations. Bhutto and Khalizad also traveled to a luncheon in Aspen, Colorado to meet with prominent U.S. political and business leaders. In October 2007, Musharraf was elected president by Pakistan's parliament. In keeping with the agreement made by Bhutto and Musharraf, the PPP representatives abstained rather than voting against Musharraf's nomination.

The US publisher HarperCollins paid Bhutto half a million dollars to produce a book, to be titled Reconciliation. Co-written with the U.S. political scientist and journalist Mark Siegel, it would be published in 2008 as Reconciliation: Islam, Democracy and the West. Reconciliation was partly a response to the Clash of Civilisations theory that had been popularised by the American political scientist Samuel P. Huntington during the 1990s. She argued that Huntington's theory denied the universality of democratic ideals and created a "self-fulfilling prophecy of fear" whereby it provoked the conflicts that it claimed to predict. In Reconciliation she proposed that Western countries finance a new "Marshall Plan" to aid the poor in Muslim-majority countries, believing that this would improve Islamic attitudes toward the West.

=== Return to Pakistan ===
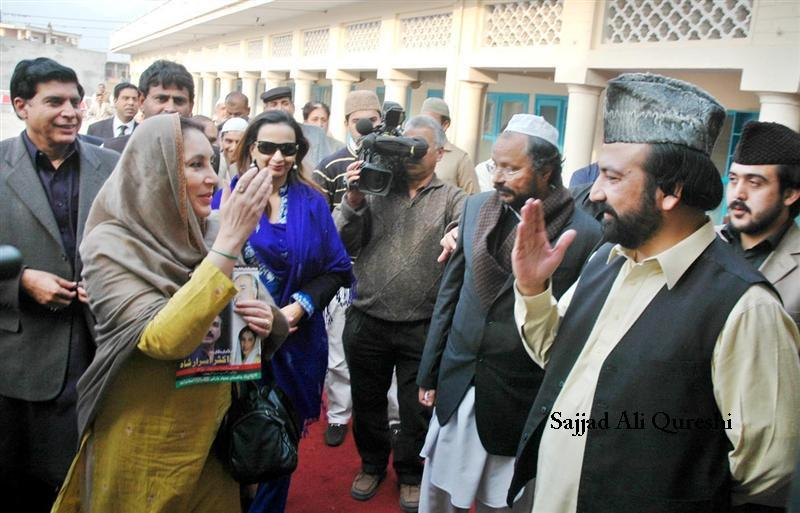
Bhutto visiting the shrine in Golra Sharif on the outskirts of Islamabad, Pakistan, 6 December 2007

Bhutto returned to Pakistan in October 2007, arriving in Karachi. It was widely thought that she had a strong chance of becoming the country's next prime minister in the 2008 national elections, although her deal with Musharraf and links with the U.S. had dented her popularity and Sharif—still in Saudi Arabia—was more popular in the opinion polls. Musharraf was annoyed at her arrival, having requested that she return only after the election. Her husband and daughters remained in Dubai, while her son was still studying at Oxford.

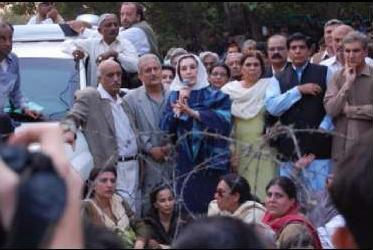
Bhutto (center) speaking to supporters outside her house, November 2007

Bhutto described the main problem facing her country as the clash between "moderation and extremism", and was pessimistic about her safety. Musharraf himself had survived several assassination attempts by Islamist militants, and warned Bhutto that she too would be a target. She requested that the US or UK take responsibility for her security, but they refused, and her security detail was instead organised by Musharraf. While her cavalcade was making its way through a crowd in Karachi, two bombs exploded, killing 149 and injuring 402. Bhutto herself was physically unharmed. Bhutto alleged that there were four suicide squads that had been dispatched to eliminate her and that there were key officials in the government involved in the plot; she sent a list naming these officials to Musharraf. Bhutto requested that Musharraf bring in the British Scotland Yard or the United States' Federal Bureau of Investigation to investigate the crime, but he refused.

Relations between the pair were further strained when Musharraf declared a state of emergency and suspended the constitution in November, at which point Bhutto was visiting Dubai. The PPP and PML-N launched protests at Musharraf's actions. Against the warnings of some of her advisors, Bhutto quickly returned to Pakistan, where she was briefly placed under house arrest. She then publicly denounced Musharraf, fearing that any association with him would damage her credibility. On 26 November, Sharif returned from exile; that same day, Bhutto filed papers to contest two parliamentary seats in the Larkana constituency. As he had previously agreed with Bhutto, Musharraf then retired as army chief and was sworn in as Pakistan's civilian president.

In early December, Bhutto met with Sharif to publicise their demand that Musharraf fulfil his promise to lift the state of emergency before January's parliamentary elections, threatening to boycott the vote if he failed to comply. On 16 December, Musharraf did so. Bhutto announced that the PPP would campaign on "the five E's": employment, education, energy, environment, and equality. The PPP's manifesto called for greater civilian oversight of, and restrictions on, the military and intelligence agencies. They also vowed to rid the intelligence services of elements driven by political or religious motives.

== Assassination ==
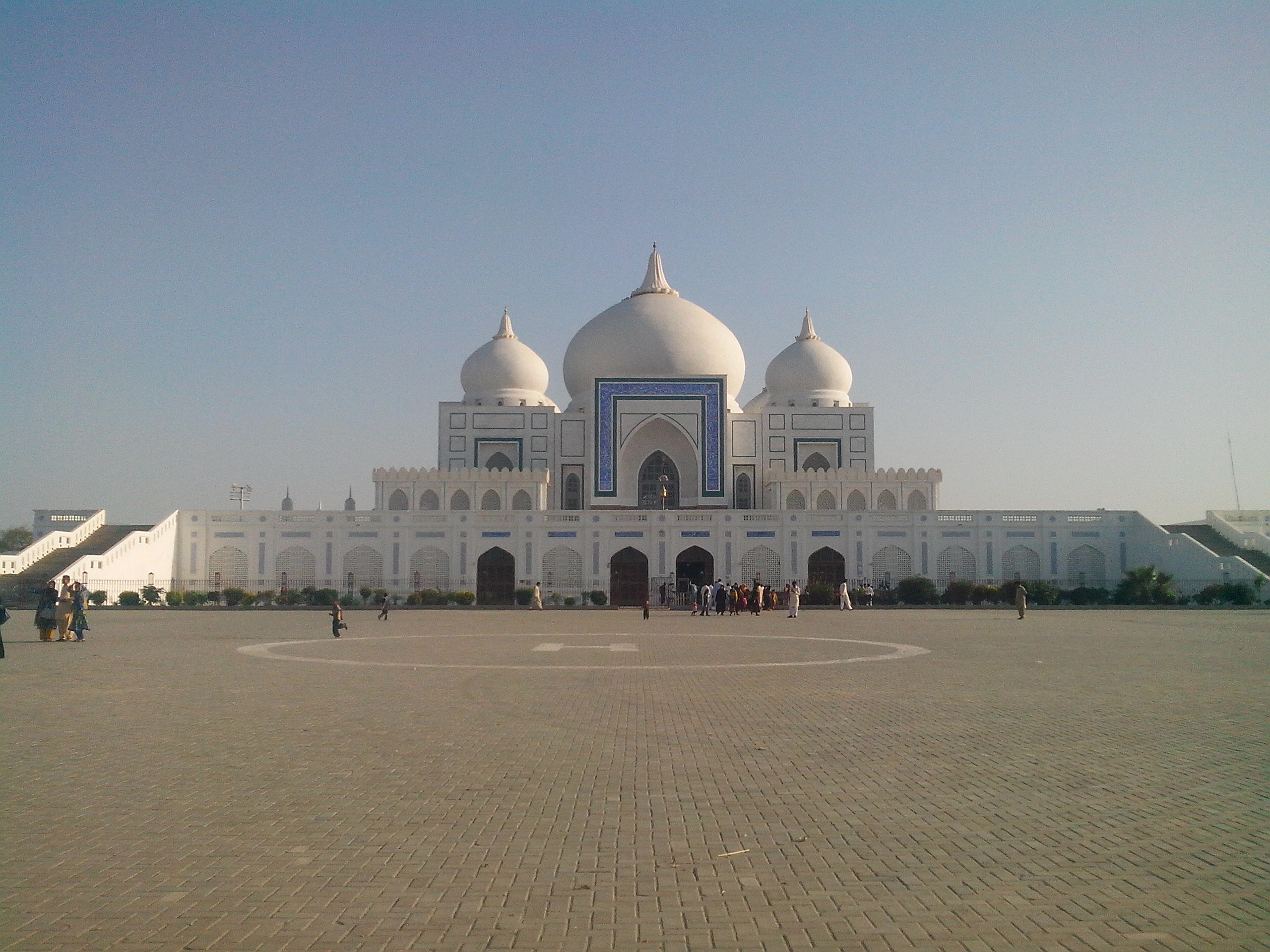
The Bhutto family mausoleum in Garhi Khuda Bakhsh, where Bhutto was buried alongside several members of her family

On the morning of 27 December 2007, Bhutto met with Afghan president Hamid Karzai. In the afternoon, she gave a speech at a PPP rally held in Rawalpindi's Liaquat National Bagh. On leaving in a bulletproof vehicle, she opened the car's escape hatch and stood up to wave to the surrounding crowds. A man standing within two to three metres of the car fired three gunshots at her and detonated a suicide vest packed with ball bearings. Bhutto was fatally injured; reports differ as to whether she was hit by bullets or by shrapnel from the explosion. Twenty-two others also died. Bhutto was rushed to Rawalpindi General Hospital but was clinically dead on arrival and attempts at resuscitation were unsuccessful. No autopsy was conducted, and the body was swiftly transported to Chaklala Air Base. The following day, she was buried next to her father in the Bhutto family mausoleum, Garhi Khuda Bakhsh, her family graveyard near Larkana. Musharraf declared a three-day period of mourning, while PPP supporters rioted in various parts of Pakistan, leading to at least 50 deaths.

Authorities claimed that the assassin had been a teenage boy from South Waziristan. They also stated that they had proof that the attack had been masterminded by Baitullah Mehsud, leader of the Pakistani Taliban. The United States Central Intelligence Agency concurred that this was probable, although Mehsud denied the accusation. Mehsud nevertheless had a motive: he believed that Bhutto's pro-American and secularist agenda would undermine the Pakistani Taliban's control of South Waziristan and hinder the growth of Sunni Islamist radicalism. Al-Qaeda commander Mustafa Abu al-Yazid claimed responsibility for the assassination, declaring that "We terminated the most precious American asset which vowed to defeat [the] mujahideen." The PPP accused the government of a cover-up, with several PPP figures claiming that Bhutto had been killed by a sniper linked to the intelligence agencies. Within Pakistan, there was also public speculation that the attack might have been masterminded by India or the United States. Musharraf agreed to invite Britain's Scotland Yard to investigate the assassination, although its eventual report proved inconclusive. Requests for the body to be exhumed for an autopsy were rejected by Zardari.

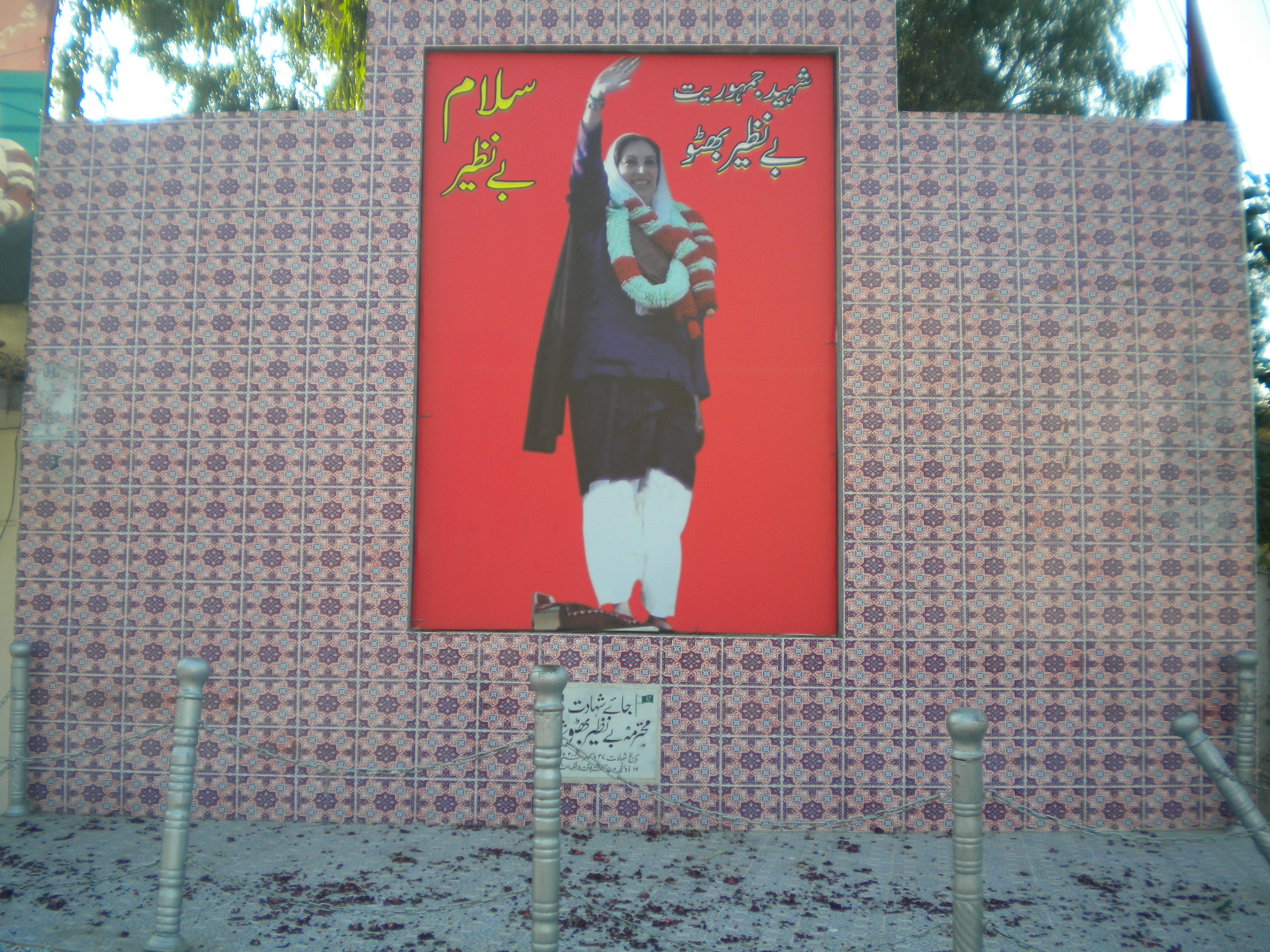
A memorial to Bhutto erected at the site of her assassination, featuring a portrait framed by pink tiles.

In Bhutto's political will, she had designated her son Bilawal, who was then 19, as her political heir as chair of the PPP. It also specified that her husband should serve as custodial chairman until Bilawal completed his formal education. Zardari became co-chair of the PPP. The academic Anna Suvorova specified that Bhutto's assassination created "a real family cult", one which was "fuelled by various apocrypha, rituals, and relics". In the wake of Bhutto's death, the election was postponed from January to February 2008, when it resulted in the formation of a coalition government bringing together the PPP and the Pakistan Muslim League (Nawaz). The new coalition put forth PPP member Yousuf Raza Gilani as prime minister. Musharraf, facing likely impeachment, resigned as president in August. He fled to London although, in February 2011, a Rawalpindi court issued a subpoena for him on the grounds that he had not acted on known threats to Bhutto and had provided insufficient security to protect her. In September 2008, Zardari was elected President of Pakistan by the country's electoral college; he remained in that position until 2013.

As president, Zardari called for a United Nations investigation into his wife's assassination. In 2009, the UN secretary general Ban Ki-moon established a three-person team to lead the investigation comprising the Chilean Heraldo Muñoz, Irish Peter FitzGerald, and Indonesian Marzuki Darusman. Although it was not in the commission's remit to identify a culprit, Muñoz later expressed the view that the assassination was likely carried out by the Pakistani Taliban, perhaps with the support of Mehsud, and that they may well have been assisted by rogue elements in the country's intelligence agencies. He also expressed the view that the original police investigation had been deliberately botched. In February 2012, the Pakistani official enquiry issued its final report, placing responsibility for the attack with 27 different militant groups. In May 2013, the state's main prosecutor in the Bhutto case, Zulfikar Ali, was himself assassinated in Islamabad. There was never a smoking gun in the Bhutto investigation. Many in Pakistan had reasons for wanting Bhutto dead; some saw her as corrupt, and her killing was considered advantageous to both the military establishment and to the Islamic fundamentalists who despised her.

== Ideology ==
Bhutto was committed to democracy and modernisation, and believed that the future of the Islamic world lay in the embrace of these processes. However, Allen thought that it was "hard to pin down" what Bhutto's "core political values" actually were. Bhatia described Bhutto as having "liberal convictions" and a "self-evidently progressive outlook", while Suvorova thought that Bhutto presented herself as "the outpost of universal liberal values in conservative Pakistan" for a Western audience. Bhutto biographer G. S. Bhargava thought that in the context of Pakistani politics, she could "pass" for a social democrat. Her friend Catherine Drucker, who knew her while the two women were at Oxford University, said Bhutto's political views were then akin to those "commonplace" within the "mild leftism of the day". Bhargava added that, through her education in governance and politics at Harvard and then Oxford, Bhutto had "a thorough exposure to political theory and practice, in historical perspective as well as in the contemporary setting".

Bhutto admired the Thatcherite economic policies pursued by Prime Minister Margaret Thatcher in the United Kingdom; she was, according to biographer Mushtaq Ahmed, a "zealous convert" to privatisation and market economics. Bhutto advocated the creation of an expanded economically and politically stable middle class in Pakistan, believing that this was needed in order to sustain a stable democratic state. Allen commented that although the PPP had once been officially socialist in ideology, Bhutto "was not a natural socialist, or even as adept at talking the talk as Zulfikar had been". She disagreed with her father's socialist economic policies, and when in power sought to privatise various industries that had been nationalised in the 1970s. Ahmed thus suggested that while under Bhutto the PPP continued to profess ideals of egalitarianism and claimed it would enhance the welfare of peasants and workers, such "progressive phraseology" couched an absence of economic policies to benefit the poor. Instead, Ahmed thought, its policies primarily benefited "the privileged classes" and was thus a right-wing rather than left-wing party.

During her years in office, Bhutto also did nothing to seriously challenge the feudal nature of rural Pakistan. Under Bhutto, Ahmed wrote, people from the wealthy feudal class dominated the PPP "both at the federal and provincial levels". Bhargava suggested that, because of the period in which she was operating, Bhutto did not need to engage in the "verbal radicalism" employed by her father, not needing to "clamor for a socialist identity" in order to win votes and allowing her to be "a pragmatist in both word and deed". Lamb described Bhutto at being skilled in using populist strategies in election campaigns. In a 2007 article for the Los Angeles Times, Bhutto's estranged niece, Fatima Bhutto, called her "a puppet 'democrat'" linked to the U.S. government's neoconservative agenda.

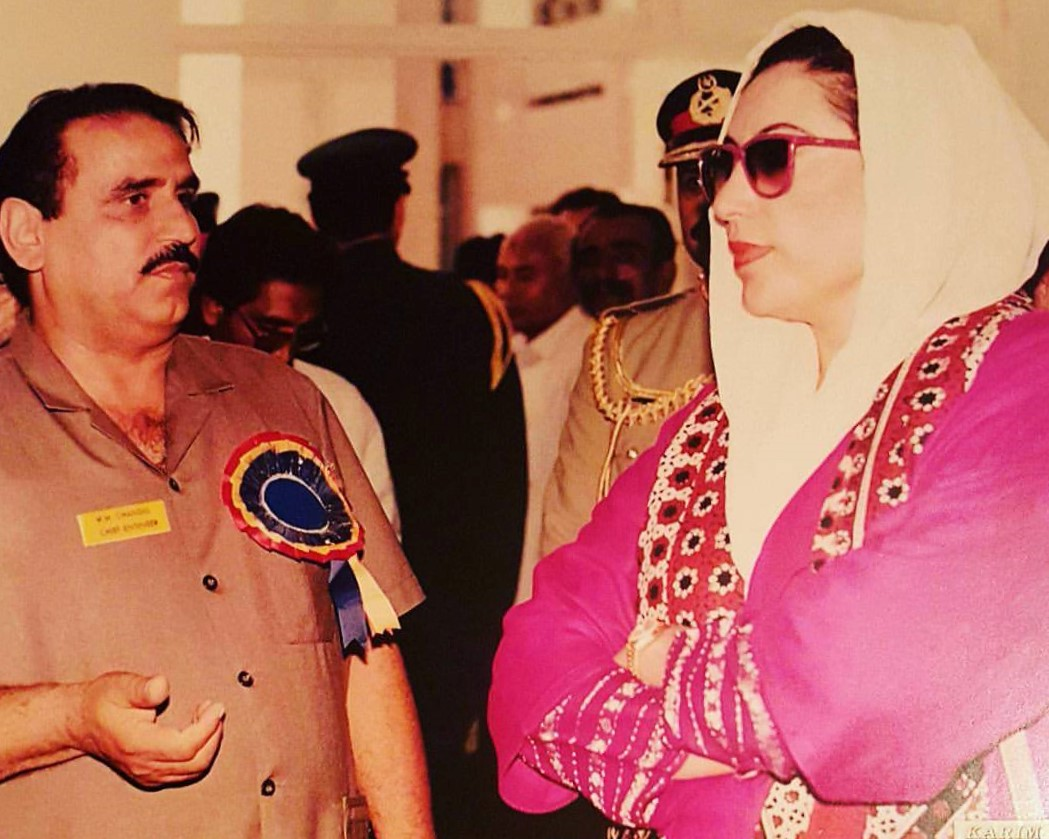
Bhutto meeting with M. M. Chandio in 1996

Under Bhutto's leadership, the PPP was officially secular, as were the governments which she led. However, in Pakistan at the time, the term "secularisation" was often understood not as reflecting the separation of religious institutions and the state, but rather had connotations of atheism and irreligion. Thus, Suvorova argued, Bhutto opposed the secularisation of Islamic societies. Bhutto also took a hard stance against militant Islamism. Although she had to compromise with Pakistan's powerful Islamist lobby, she favored a secular government for the country. Allen wrote that "at no time in her years in power did Bhutto, Westernised though she was, feel comfortable in seriously challenging Pakistan's Islamists." Although during her campaigns she vowed to abolish the hudud restrictions on women that Zia had introduced, she never did so; instead these were revoked by Musharraf in 2006, when he signed the Women's Protection Bill.

Bhutto was indignant when faced with sexism, and regarded herself as an ardent supporter of women's rights; however, Suvorova stated that she was "never a feminist in theory or practice". Bhutto expressed the view that there were differences between male and female leaders, and that "women leaders are more generous and forgiving, male leaders tend to be more inflexible and more rigid." In contrast to those Islamic clerics who insisted that her involvement in politics contrasted with Islamic values, she insisted that there was no conflict. In her view, "It was men's interpretation of our religion that restricted women's opportunities, not our religion itself. Islam in fact had been quite progressive towards women from its inception."

Bhutto described her main role model as Fatimah, the daughter of the Islamic prophet Muhammad, stating that she admired her piety, wisdom, and courage. She also described the Indian prime minister Indira Gandhi as a political inspiration. While a serious opponent of the Hudud Ordinances, some of whose provisions were widely regarded as discriminatory against women and which in practice sometimes resulted in women being punished in cases of rape and adultery, Bhutto was unable to repeal them during her tenure as Prime Minister due to opposition from conservative groups and constitutional constraints.

== Personal life ==
=== Personality ===
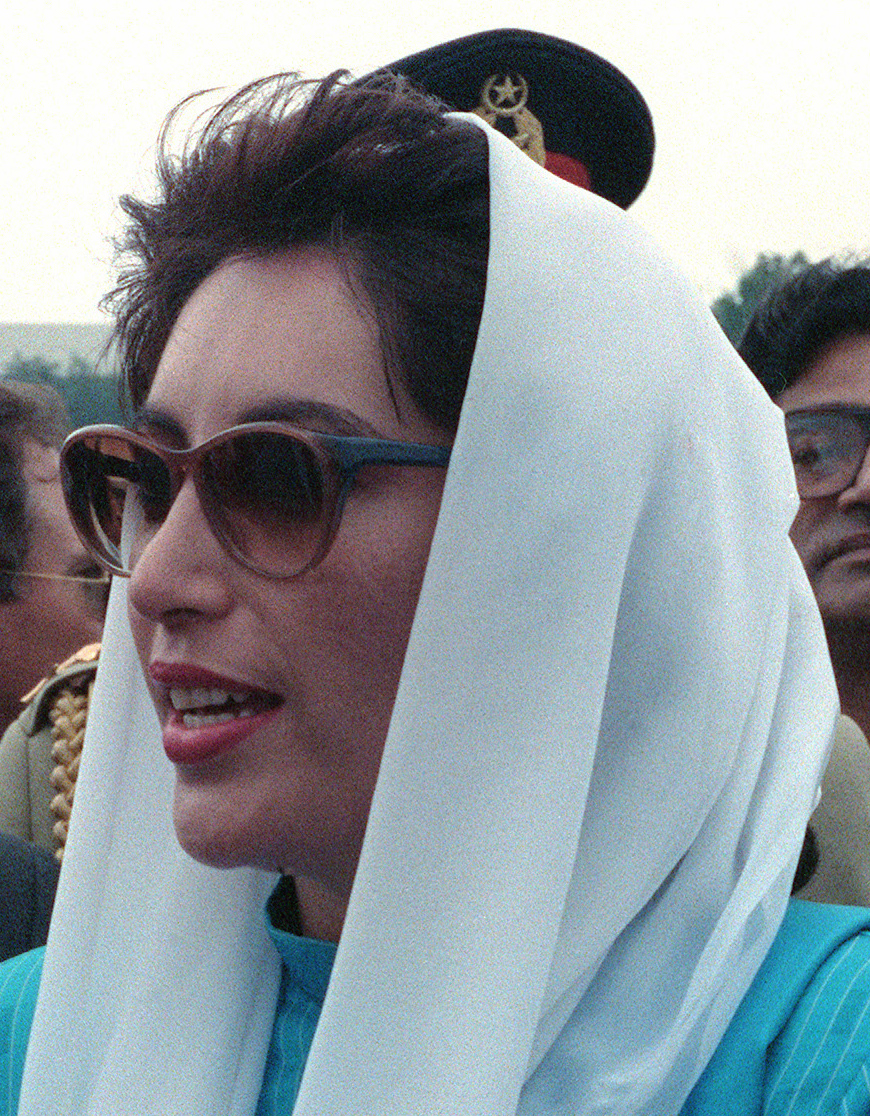
Bhutto photographed in 1988. Allen stated that had Bhutto died that year, "She would be remembered as a shining example of what youth, fortitude, and idealism can accomplish even in the most brutal and repressive political culture".

According to Bhutto biographer Shyam Bhatia, Bhutto possessed a desire to be liked and to be popular, and for this reason "was prepared to be all things to all people", having a "chameleon-like" quality to blend into her environment. Muñoz concurred, describing Bhutto as "a woman of contradictions". Suvorova similarly observed that Bhutto presented herself differently when in the West compared to when she was in Pakistan. While in Pakistan Bhutto presented herself as a conservative Muslim who always wore her head covered, but as a student in Oxford she had adopted a more liberal lifestyle, tending to wear a T-shirt and jeans and occasionally drinking wine. As a politician, she was conscious of how her image was presented in Pakistan; she dressed modestly, was never photographed with a glass lest it is interpreted as containing alcohol, and would refuse to shake men's hands. In the country, she also wore a white dupatta on her head to placate Islamist opposition; her mother and other female family members had not covered their hair in this manner.

The journalist Christina Lamb believed that in being raised in a wealthy and aristocratic family, Bhutto was unable to appreciate the struggles of Pakistan's poorest. The Islamic studies scholar Akbar S. Ahmed, who went to school with Bhutto, wrote that she was a "pampered and precocious" child. Bhatia claimed that at Oxford, where he first met her, Bhutto was spoilt, self-obsessed, and prone to throwing temper tantrums, although at the same time was humorous and generous, willing to pay for her friends' meals whenever at a restaurant. Allen suggested that Bhutto retained her "characteristic de haut en bas arrogance, a relic of her feudal upbringing", arguing that her key character flaw had been "a belief in the special, almost sacred destiny of herself and the Bhutto family" and that accordingly, while she "spoke like a democrat ... she thought and felt as a dynast". In later life, Bhutto was accused of being addicted to power, although Allen thought it more accurate to state that she was "addicted to adulation", suggesting that this stemmed from a narcissistic element to Bhutto's personality.

Familial charisma is rare, but in Benazir's case the Bhutto name matters, in that her father's charisma easily transferred to her. She had her own charisma when she emerged in the 1980s as a young, articulate, well-educated, and well-spoken woman. Her chief assets were her intelligence, her confidence, and the fact that she could talk to people of various backgrounds with empathy. She had the rare quality of humor, which she never lost in spite of leading an uncertain and challenging life. Above all, she could use the media effectively. Her faults as a political leader were many. Too many stories of corruption stuck to her. She was not a good administrator. She was too inclined to listen to her small kitchen cabinet, which very often consisted of people who would say what they thought she wanted to hear. She became prime minister at a particularly young age and had no prior political or other cabinet experience.

— Islamic studies scholar Akbar S. Ahmed, 2008

Commentators and biographers have said that Bhutto shared her father's charisma but also his arrogance, and that like him she was impatient with criticism. The connection between Bhutto and her father was endorsed by Allen, who stated that they "had much in common: strength, charisma, political instinct, and the courage, part, and parcel of their arrogance, that was so characteristic of both". Allen also believed that Bhutto was so dedicated to her father that "psychologically", she was "unable to admit to any imperfection" in him. After his death she repeatedly presented his execution as a martyrdom. Bhutto imitated many of her father's mannerisms and his style of speech; the journalist Carla Hall referred to her having a "vaguely British accent". She was an accomplished orator, having honed her skill at public speaking while president of the Oxford Debating Society.

Having encountered her later in life, Muñoz regarded Bhutto as a "charming and intelligent" woman. Close friends called her "BB", a name with which she signed some of her personal letters. Her parents gave her the childhood nickname of "Pinkie", possibly alluding to her rosy complexion.

Allen described Bhutto as "a woman of action rather than an intellectual". Bhutto's choice of reading material was usually either utilitarian or pleasurable rather than intellectual; she enjoyed reading Mills & Boon romance novels and the celebrity-focused Hello! magazine. She read a number of self-help books, telling a friend that "for all the lows in my life, those self-help books helped me survive, I can tell you". Her father had also encouraged her to read the writings of various prominent political figures, among them Napoleon Bonaparte, Otto von Bismarck, Vladimir Lenin, Mustafa Kemal Atatürk, and Mao Zedong. She had a love of French and Italian cuisine, and was a great fan of the music of American singer Neil Diamond.

Like her father, Bhutto professed an adherence to Sufism, which is widespread in the family's native Sindh province. Allen thought her to have "some genuine, if unorthodox, religious belief, mixed up with superstition". Bhargava stated that Bhutto was "dedicated and devout in her religious principles but modern and emancipated in her behavior and outlook". In conversation, she often used the phrase "inshallah", and insisted that the Quran supported the equality of the sexes. Bhutto was anti-abortion and spoke forcefully against abortion, most notably at the 1994 meeting of the International Conference on Population and Development in Cairo, where she accused the West of "seeking to impose adultery, abortion, intercourse education and other such matters on individuals, societies, and religions which have their own social ethos".

=== Family ===
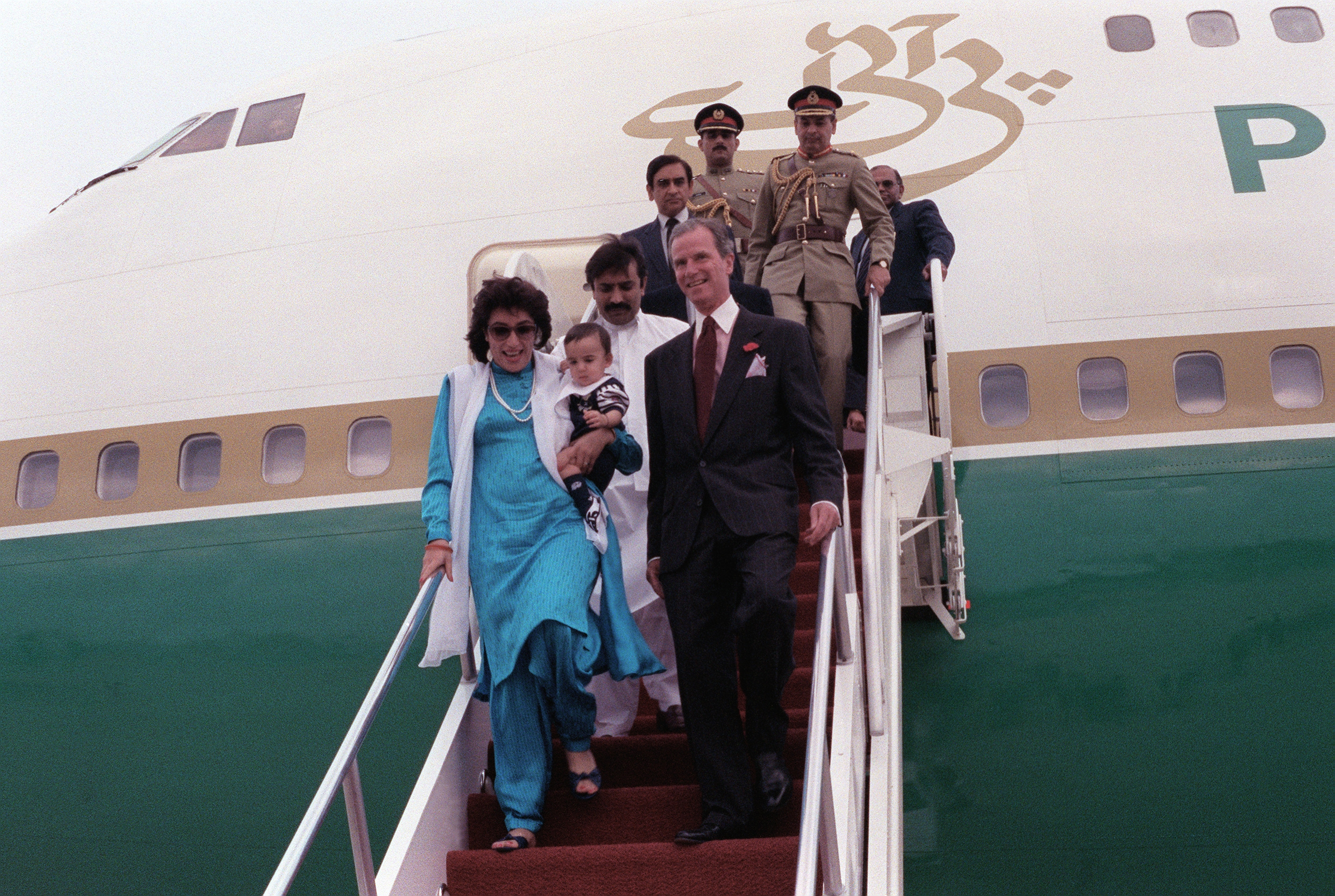
Bhutto embarking from an airplane at Andrews Air Force Base during her 1989 state visit to the United States. She carried her son; her husband followed behind.

Bhutto was the oldest of four children. Of these, her younger sister Sanam, or "Sunny", remained close to her throughout her life.

On returning to Pakistan in 1988, Bhutto's mother arranged for her marriage to the businessman Asif Ali Zardari. Many of her friends were surprised that Bhutto acquiesced to Islamic tradition given her liberal attitudes, however, she later related that she "felt obligations to my family and my religion" to go through with it and that her high public profile made it difficult for her to find a husband through other means. She consistently presented an image of respect and loyalty for her husband, throughout the many accusations and periods of imprisonment he faced. Allen commented that it would probably never be known how happy the couple's marriage was, for Bhutto "always projected support and loyalty for her unpopular mate".

In the final years of Bhutto's life, she and her husband lived apart. According to Allen, she would have been aware that a divorce or a public separation would have resulted in the end of her political career in Pakistan due to social stigma around the subject. In a 2007 interview, Bhutto said that she and her husband were living apart because of his medical requirements, adding that she visited him every month in New York. Regarding the rumors of separation, in 2008 Bhutto's friend Victoria Schofield said that the marriage should not be judged by ordinary standards. According to Schofield, after Zardari's return from prison, the Bhuttos' marriage was going through a process of "readjustment". In 2018, Bhutto's friend Ron Suskind described the marriage as "probably not all bad", although added that Bhutto did not consider her husband to be an equal partner in the marriage.

The couple had three children: a son, Bilawal, was born on 21 September 1988, while she was campaigning for that year's election. She also had two daughters, Bakhtawar Bhutto (born 25 January 1990) and Aseefa (born 3 February 1993). When she gave birth to Bakhtawar, she became the first elected head of government to give birth while in office. Bhutto was devoted to her father and husband. In later life, she increasingly came to see success through the prism of her family.

== Public image and legacy ==
The Benazir Bhutto of 1988 was a uniting figure for her country; that of twenty years later, a divisive one. In retrospect, her best and worst qualities seem so intimately linked that the course of her career might almost have been predicted.

— Biographer Brooke Allen, 2016

Muñoz described Bhutto as "one of Pakistan's most important political figures, a respected world leader, and the leading stateswoman in the Islamic world". Allen suggested that although Bhutto's record in office was that of a "corrupt, compromised politician", she displayed admirable qualities, especially valor in the face of opposition. Within the Islamic world, Bhutto was often regarded as "a genuine Muslim political leader" and recognised as the head of Pakistan's most popular political party. Bhargava expressed the view that at the time of her initial election, Bhutto's "personal popularity" was "tremendous", larger than any that her father had previously achieved, with Suvorova suggesting that at this point in her life Bhutto was often regarded as a "quasi-saint" by her supporters. In 1996, the Guinness Book of Records named her the most popular international politician of the year, and she also received such awards at the French Legion of Honour and Oxford University's Doctor Honours Causa.

At the same time there were many Pakistanis who despised her, disliking her popularity, her ties to Western nations, and her modernising agenda. Extremist Sunni Islamist elements opposed her because of their belief that female leaders are un-Islamic, and because she was a Shia Muslim. They maintained that her participation in politics meant associating with men to whom she was not related and that this compromised the modesty required by Islam. Conservative clerical opponents also claimed that by being prime minister, Bhutto was failing her religious duty, which was to focus her energies on having as many children as possible.

Ahmed stated that Bhutto was one of the very few political leaders who had been able to "assume the iconic status of a political martyr in the West while simultaneously evoking strong sentiments in the Muslim world". He therefore contrasted her with contemporaries like Iraq's Saddam Hussein who were popular domestically but hated in the West, and those like Egypt's Hosni Mubarak who curried favor with Western governments while alienating their domestic audience. Bhutto gained popularity in Western nations in part because she could present herself as being "part of their world", speaking a high standard of English and having been educated at Harvard and Oxford. While her Western supporters sometimes had doubts about her ability to govern, they generally viewed her as a progressive figure who could advance democracy and counter-terrorism in Pakistan.

Allen commented that "the cards might have been stacked in Bhutto's favor—she was rich, educated, aristocratic, the favored daughter of a very powerful father—nevertheless, her achievement was a remarkable one" given the male-dominated environment of late-20th century Pakistani society. Mushtaq Ahmed similarly believed that "for a woman to win an election in a male-dominated society was an achievement", and that "her victory over the forces of reaction and persecution was an unprecedented accomplishment in political history." Ahmed thought that the election of a female prime minister in a Muslim-majority country served as "a proclamation that Islam was a forward-thinking religion". He added that as a pioneering female leader, Bhutto had "barely half a dozen" parallels, among them Indira Gandhi, Margaret Thatcher, Golda Meir, Chandrika Kumaratunga, and Corazon Aquino. Comparisons with Aquino were often made—and welcomed by Bhutto—because both women had fought against a military dictatorship and spent time in exile. She became a global icon for women's rights, and inspired many Pakistani girls and women by her example. The Pakistani women's rights activist Malala Yousafzai—who received the 2014 Nobel Peace Prize—cited Bhutto as a personal inspiration. Writing in The American Prospect magazine, the journalist Adele M. Stan called Bhutto "An Imperfect Feminist", commenting that despite her efforts towards women's rights, these were sometimes offset by her compromises with Pakistan's Islamists and her support of the Taliban's rise to power in neighbouring Afghanistan.

Assessing her legacy, William Dalrymple wrote in The Guardian that "it's wrong for the West simply to mourn Benazir Bhutto as a martyred democrat since her legacy was far murkier and more complex". Despite her western and positive image in the world, Bhutto's controversial policies and support have made her legacy much more complicated. Benazir Bhutto failed to revert the controversial Hudood Ordinance – a contentious presidential ordinance which suppressed women's rights, making them subordinate to men. In 2009, CBS News described her legacy as "mixed", and commented that: "it's only in death that she will become an icon—in some ways, people will look at her accomplishments through rose-tinted glasses rather than remembering the corruption charges, her lack of achievements or how much she was manipulated by other people." Jason Burke, writing in The Guardian about Benazir, termed her "[both] a victim, as well as in part a culprit, of its [Pakistan's] chronic instability".

Several universities and public buildings in Pakistan have been named after her. The Pakistani government honored Bhutto on her birthday by renaming Islamabad's airport Benazir Bhutto International Airport, Muree Road of Rawalpindi as Benazir Bhutto Road and Rawalpindi General Hospital as Benazir Bhutto Hospital. Prime Minister Yousaf Raza Gillani, a member of Bhutto's PPP, asked Musharraf to pardon convicts on death row on her birthday in honour of Bhutto. Several months after Bhutto's death, a series of Pakistani postage stamps were announced to mark her 55th birthday.

== Books ==
- Daughter of Destiny: An Autobiography. 1989.
- Reconciliation: Islam, Democracy, and the West. 2008.

Party political offices
Preceded by Nusrat Bhutto	Leader of the Pakistan Peoples Party; 1982–2007; Acting: 1982–1984	Succeeded by Bilawal Bhutto Zardari
Preceded by Nusrat Bhutto	Leader of the Pakistan Peoples Party; 1982–2007; Acting: 1982–1984	Succeeded by Asif Ali Zardari
Political offices
Preceded by Muhammad Khan Junejo	Prime Minister of Pakistan; 1988–1990	Succeeded by Ghulam Mustafa Jatoi; Acting
Preceded by Mahbub ul Haq; Acting	Minister of Finance; 1988–1990	Succeeded by Sartaj Aziz
Preceded by Mahmoud Haroon; Acting	Minister of Defence; 1988–1990	Succeeded by Ghous Ali Shah
Preceded by Khan Abdul Wali Khan	Leader of the Opposition; 1990–1993	Succeeded by Nawaz Sharif
Preceded by Moeenuddin Ahmad Qureshi; Acting	Prime Minister of Pakistan; 1993–1996	Succeeded by Malik Meraj Khalid; Acting
Preceded by Syed Babar Ali	Minister of Finance; 1994–1996	Succeeded by Naveed Qamar
Preceded by Nawaz Sharif	Leader of the Opposition; 1996–1999	Succeeded by Fazl-ur-Rehman
Diplomatic posts
Preceded by Marich Man Singh Shrestha	Chairperson of SAARC; 1988	Succeeded by Maumoon Abdul Gayoom
