= Caá Catí =

Caá Catí Ka'a Katĩ
- Town
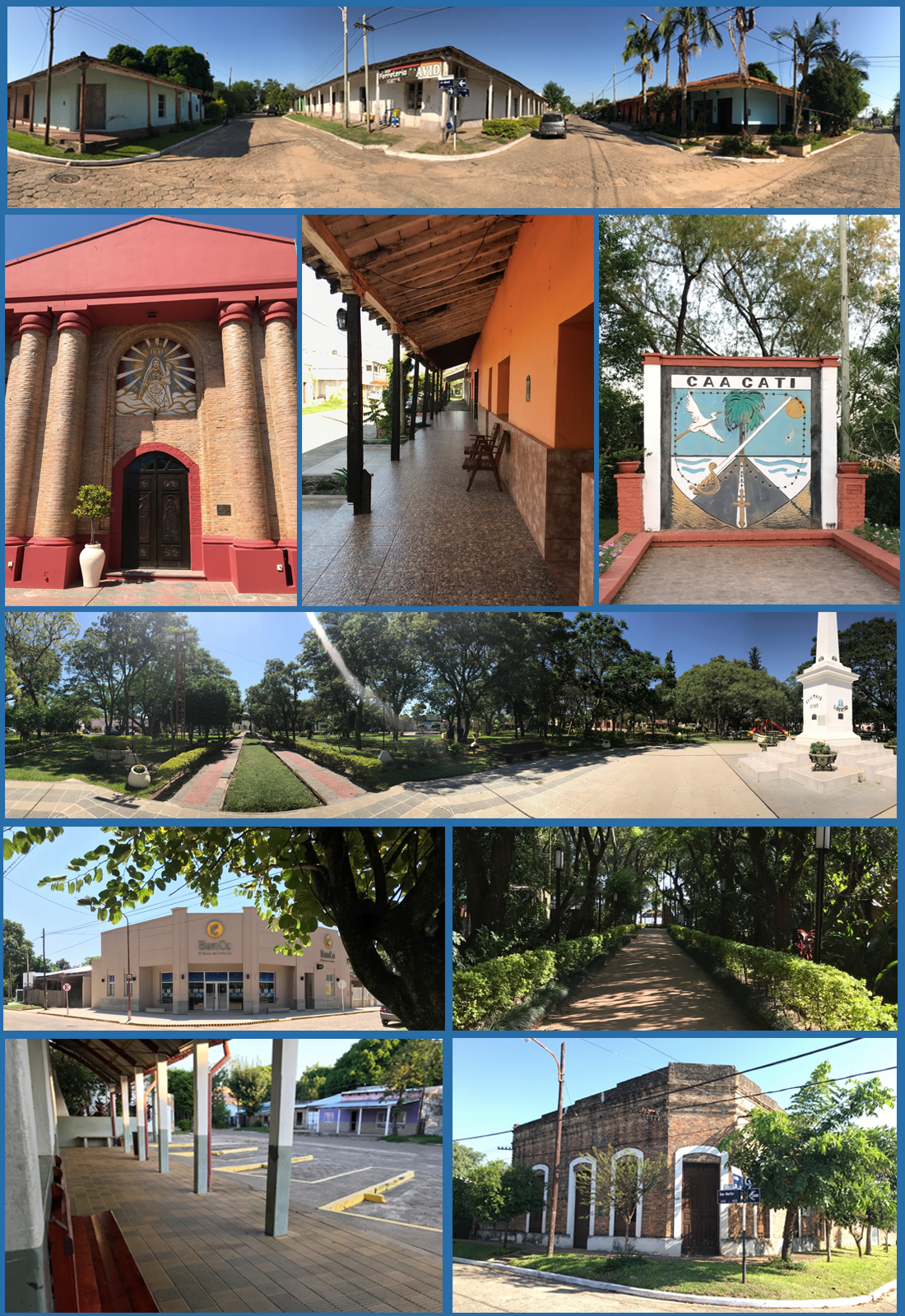

- Location of Caá Catí in Argentina
- Coordinates: 27°45′00″S 57°36′58″W
- Country: Argentina
- Province: Corrientes
- Department: General Paz
- Elevation: 59 m (194 ft)

Population
  - Total: 7,573
- Demonym: caacatiense
- Time zone: UTC−3 (ART)
- CPA base: W3407
- Dialing code: +54 3781

Caá Catí (Guarani: Ka'a Katĩ) or Nuestra Señora del Rosario de Caá Catí is a town in Corrientes Province, Argentina. It is the head town of the General Paz Department.

The town was founded in 1707.

From 1912 until 1927 Caá Catí had a railway station on the Ferrocarril Económico Correntino narrow gauge railway between Corrientes and Mburucuyá

In 2026, the city adopted Guaraní as a co-official language.
