= Mburucuyá =

Mburucuyá is the Guaraní name for certain passion flowers, such as Passiflora caerulea and Passiflora edulis. It is the origin of the term "maracujá", and namesake for several localities in South America:

- Mburucuyá, Corrientes
- Mburucuyá National Park
- Mburucuyá Department
