= ARP Humaitá =

River gunboat used by the Paraguayan Navy

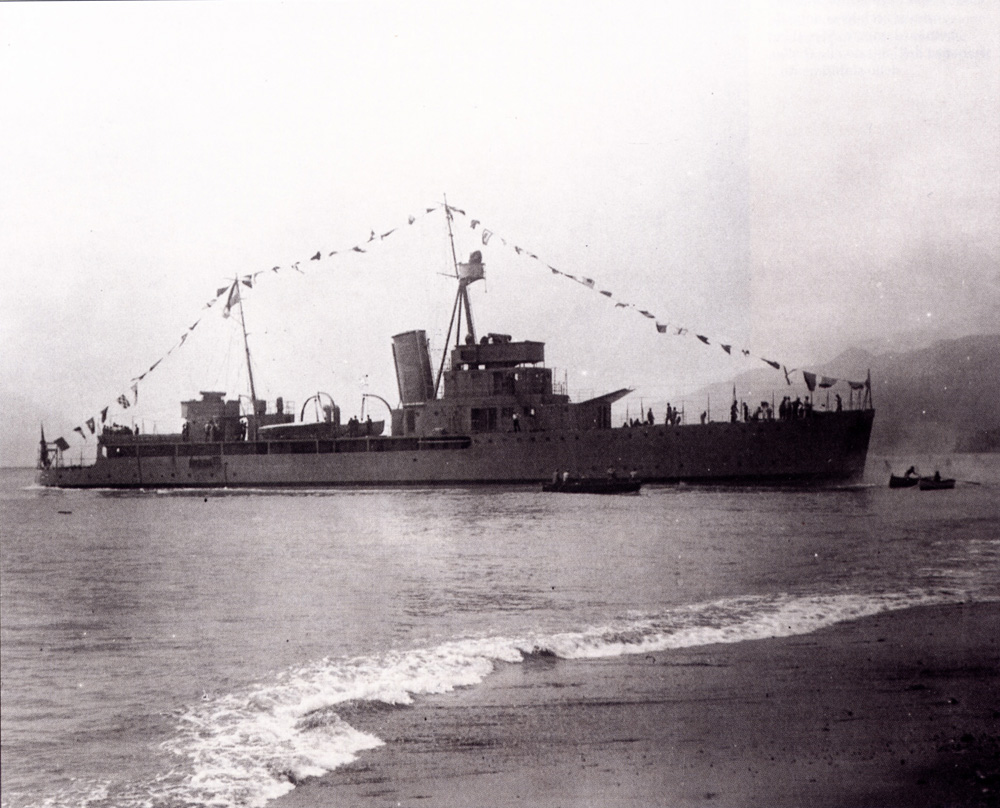
- ARP Humaitá shortly after being launched in Italy (1931)

History

Paraguay
- Name: Humaitá
- Builder: Cantieri navali Odero (Sestri Ponente, Genoa)
- Laid down: April 12, 1929
- Launched: April 16, 1930
- Commissioned: January 21, 1931
- Fate: museum ship in 1992

General characteristics
- Class & type: Humaitá-class gunboat
- Displacement: full: 835 t (822 long tons); max: 1,050 t (1,030 long tons)
- Length: 71.2 m (233 ft 7 in)
- Beam: 10.5 m (34 ft)
- Draft: 1.67–2.13 m (5 ft 6 in – 7 ft 0 in)
- Propulsion: 2 × 1,500 hp Parsons-type steam turbines
- Speed: 17 kn (31 km/h; 20 mph)
- Range: 2,822 nautical miles (approximately 4,542 km (2,822 mi))
- Complement: 242 (during wartime); 151 (during peacetime); 96 (skeleton crew); up to 1,200 passengers
- Armament: 4 × 120 mm guns; 3 × 76 mm guns; 2 × 40 mm anti-aircraft guns; 6 naval mines

ARP Humaitá was a river gunboat of the Humaitá class used by the Paraguayan Navy. Launched in 1930, it participated in the Chaco War, transporting soldiers to the front. After the war, it was involved in numerous rebellions. In 1983, it was decommissioned from active service in the Paraguayan Navy and made accessible to the public as a museum ship.

== History ==
In 1927, President Eligio Ayala decided to expand Paraguay's navy in response to the escalating conflict with Bolivia over the Gran Chaco region, a dispute ongoing since 1887. Naval officer José Bozzano developed plans for the new vessels, emphasizing shallow draft and a significant number of deck guns at the expense of armor and mobility. These specifications were designed for operations on rivers against air and land targets. Negotiations were conducted with Denmark, Italy, France, and the United Kingdom. On 26 September 1928, a contract was signed with an Italian supplier for the construction of two gunboats at a cost of US$1.25 million.

=== Construction ===
The keel for the ship was laid on 21 April 1929 at the Cantieri navali Odero shipyard in Genoa, Italy. Initially named Capitán Cabral, the vessel was launched on 16 April 1930. Its name was officially changed to Humaitá on 30 July 1930.

== Construction details ==
=== Hull ===
The empty ship weighed 621 tons, with displacement increasing to 835 tons after equipping and provisioning with 170 tons of fuel. The vessel could additionally carry up to 215 tons of cargo. The gunboat measured 71.2 meters in length and 10.5 meters in width. A key design feature was the hull's shallow draft, with a height of 4.4 meters. When fully equipped, the draft reached 180 centimeters, increasing to 213 centimeters at maximum load. The midsection of Humaitá was protected by a 15-mm thick armored belt, with the command post having 20 mm of armor and gun shields 10 mm thick.

=== Propulsion ===
The gunboat was powered by two Parsons-type steam turbines, each producing 1,500 hp. Initially equipped with two Thornycroft-Shultz boilers, they were later replaced by Yarrow boilers, both operating at a pressure of 18 kg/cm^{2}. The vessel had two propellers and could reach a maximum speed of 17 knots, with an economical cruising speed of 12 knots. At maximum speed, Humaitá could cover a distance of 2,822 nautical miles.

=== Armament ===
The primary deck artillery comprised four 120 mm Ansaldo 1926 guns mounted in two twin turrets and three 76 mm guns, likely Ansaldo 1917 models, manufactured by Odero-Terni in La Spezia. Anti-aircraft defense was provided by two QF 2-pounder naval guns, produced under a Vickers license. The ship had a single mine rail and was typically armed with six Vickers "H" MK II naval mines. During the Chaco War, six heavy machine guns were additionally installed. In 1974, the 40 mm anti-aircraft guns were replaced by Oerlikon 20 mm cannons, and one of the 76 mm guns was swapped for a twin-mounted Bofors 40 mm L/60 gun, manufactured in Argentina as the B "M" 45. (Note: Dobrzelewski (2012, p. 148) states that Humaitá originally had fewer guns, specifically one 76 mm caliber gun and one 40 mm caliber gun less.)

==== Artillery specifications comparison for Humaitá ====
Caliber	120 mm	76 mm	40 mm
Elevation range	-5°/+45°	-5°/+85°	-5°/+80°
Horizontal range	20,900 m	15,000 m	7,160 m
Anti-aircraft range	–	9,400 m	4,425 m
Rate of fire	3.75 rounds/min	10 rounds/min	200 rounds/min
Muzzle velocity	800 m/s	900 m/s	610 m/s
Projectile weight	45 kg (Note: Ehlers (2010, p. 72) lists this value as the weight of the shell, although the terms "shell" and "projectile" are used interchangeably in this publication.) (23.15 kg)	9.5 kg (3.5 kg)	1.315 kg (0.9 kg)
Ammunition stock (max)	200 (1,000)	200 (1,200)	1,000 (6,000)

=== Crew ===
During wartime, Humaitá's crew consisted of 15 officers, 18 non-commissioned officers, and 209 sailors. In peacetime, the number of non-commissioned officers and sailors was reduced to 12 and 124, respectively. The vessel could transport an additional 900 fully equipped soldiers or 1,200 passengers without heavy equipment. As of 2010, Humaitá operated with a skeleton crew of 96 personnel. (Note: Dobrzelewski (2012, p. 148) states that the crew of the gunboat during the Chaco War consisted of 86 people, which would be fewer than the current skeletal crew.)

=== Markings ===
Since Humaitá and Paraguay were structurally identical, they were distinguished by funnel markings – Humaitá had one stripe, while Paraguay had two. Additionally, Humaitá bore the identification number "C2" on its hull.

== Service ==
=== Beginning ===
The flag was raised on Humaitá and its sister ship Paraguay on 21 January 1931. Three weeks later, they embarked on a voyage to their homeland with a mixed Paraguayan-Italian crew. Humaitá arrived in Asunción on 5 May, and on 13 May, it officially joined the Paraguayan Navy based on decree No 40,178. The gunboat was incorporated into the Flotilla de Guerra on 20 May 1931 by decree No 40,220. Before the war broke out, the vessel had only completed a trial voyage, an eight-day journey to Bahía Negra, which took place between 22 and 29 March 1932. At the time of the war's outbreak, Humaitá had been barely used and, together with Paraguay, formed the modern core of the Paraguayan Navy.

=== Chaco War ===
The main task of the fleet during the war was troop transport. Ships departed from Asunción, loaded with soldiers and equipment, and sailed to Puerto Casado. From there, the soldiers were transported to the front by truck or continued their journey along the river to Bahía Negra. On the return trip, wounded and Bolivian prisoners were brought back. Humaitá's first transport voyage took place on 1 October 1932, carrying a detachment of the Tres Corrales regiment. According to official statistics, it completed 84 river voyages, transporting 62,546 soldiers to Puerto Casado via the Paraguay River. However, according to Ehlers, together with the sister ship, it transported approximately 267,000 people in both directions. (Note: Dobrzelewski (2012, p. 150) states that this number represents the total sum of soldiers transported by all Paraguayan naval vessels.)

The gunboat also provided anti-aircraft cover for unarmed vessels, and between convoys, it operated as an anti-aircraft battery in Asunción and Puerto Casado. The only combat action the ship participated in was a skirmish with two Bolivian Curtiss P-6 Hawk or Vickers Vespa aircraft. On the morning of 22 December 1932, the aircraft took part in an attack on Tacuarí, and later in the afternoon, they encountered Humaitá near Puerto Leda. The engagement ended with the retreat of the attacking pilots. By the end of 1934, the 120 mm gun from Humaitá was dismantled, as it was needed by Paraguayan troops besieging Villamontes. However, the action was halted due to a change in the situation on the front.

=== Peacetime rebellions ===
The first rebellion involving Humaitá occurred during Colonel Rafael Franco's coup on 17 February 1936. (Note: Ehlers (2004) cites the date as 27 February.) President Eusebio Ayala sought refuge aboard Paraguay. Initially, the navy supported loyalist forces using machine guns from both gunboats. However, when the tide turned against Ayala, the navy's top commanders declared him their prisoner.

In 1937, Humaitá underwent repairs in Buenos Aires, followed by additional maintenance combined with maneuvers in 1941. During World War II, due to fuel shortages, the vessel saw minimal activity, stationed at the Sajonia base and leaving only for Fleet Week celebrations.

In 1947, both gunboats underwent their third overhaul in Buenos Aires. On 7 March, another coup erupted in Paraguay, which spread to the ships stationed in Argentina. On 7 May, supporters of the Febreristas arrested government-loyal crew members. As the vessels lacked armament during their overhaul, they traveled to Uruguay to obtain modest weaponry. The ships began their journey back to Paraguay on 5 July, navigating the Paraná River. On 10 July, they crossed into Paraguay at Paso de Patria.

Lieutenant Colonel Alfredo Stroessner deployed an aircraft to attack Humaitá on 11 July. The next day, the vessel ran aground near the Argentine town of Ituzaingó, where it, along with its sister ship, faced further attacks by government air forces. On 15 July, government-loyal vessels Capitán Cabral, Mariscal Estigarribia, and steamships Helen Gunther and Tirador arrived to engage the stranded gunboats. By 18 July, Humaitá endured artillery shelling from land and continued air assaults. On 24 and 25 July, Stroessner's forces launched coordinated attacks on the entrenched crews from both land and water. Rising water levels in the river allowed the gunboats to attempt a breakout, but Stroessner's forces thwarted the escape. The vessels found refuge in the Argentine town of Itá Ibaté, where they were interned until the conflict subsided.

Humaitá underwent a general overhaul in Buenos Aires in 1954, followed by another between September 1965 and July 1966 in Ladário, Brazil. In 1974, it was rearmed at the Arsenal Naval in Asunción. The anti-aircraft 40 mm guns were replaced with Oerlikon 20 mm cannons, while one of the 76 mm guns was substituted with a dual 40 mm mount. The gunboat was officially retired from active service on 28 June 1983, per Decree No. 04/983.

Humaitá played a decisive role in the coup that began during the night of 2–3 February 1989. Along with other vessels, it shelled the presidential palace, congressional buildings, and fortifications, tipping the balance in favor of the rebels. This pivotal action led to the ousting of Alfredo Stroessner, who had ruled Paraguay for 35 years.

70 years after its launch, Humaitá was converted into a museum ship. It opened to visitors on 6 September 2000, near the presidential palace in Asunción. After a few years, the vessel was moved to the Sajonia base.

=== Repair and modernization timeline for Humaitá ===
Location	Date	Details
Buenos Aires	1937	
Buenos Aires	1941 (until 17 August)	Combined with maneuvers
Buenos Aires	1947 (until 5 May)	Interrupted by rebellion
Buenos Aires	30 March 1954 – 9 December 1954	
Ladário	9 September 1965 – 13 July 1966	
Asunción	1974	Re-armed

== Bibliography ==
- Ehlers, Hartmut (2004). "Kanonierki Paraguay i Humaitá" [The Gunboats Paraguay and Humaitá]. Okręty Wojenne (in Polish). 64 (2). Tarnowskie Góry. ISSN 1231-014X.
- Ehlers, Hartmut (2010). "Marynarka Wojenna Paragwaju" [The Paraguayan Navy]. Okręty Wojenne (in Polish). 1 (99). Tarnowskie Góry. ISSN 1231-014X.
- Dobrzelewski, Jarosław (2012). Wojna o Gran Chaco 1932–1935 [The Chaco War 1932–1935] (in Polish). Zabrze: inforteditions. ISBN 978-83-64023-00-2.
