= Commander of the Armed Forces (Paraguay) =

Head of the armed forces of Syria

- Comandante de las Fuerzas Militares
- Incumbent; Óscar Arnaldo Cardozo since 13 October 2022
- Armed Forces of Paraguay
- Reports to: Minister of Defence
- Appointer: the President
- Formation: 14 April 1993
- First holder: Eduardo Dionicio A. Gonzalez Petit
- Website: Official website

The Commander of the Armed Forces (Spanish: Comandante de las Fuerzas Militares) is the professional head of the Armed Forces of Paraguay.

== Commanders ==
No.	Portrait	Name (birth–death)	Term of office			Defence branch	Ref.
No.	Portrait	Name (birth–death)	Took office	Left office	Time in office	Defence branch	Ref.
1		Vicealmirante; Eduardo Dionicio A. Gonzalez Petit	14 April 1993	3 February 1995	1 year, 295 days	Paraguayan Navy	
2		General de ejército Silvio Rafael Noguera Ramirez	3 February 1995	5 August 1998	3 years, 183 days	Paraguayan Army	
3		General de ejército Eligio Ramon Torres Heyn	5 August 1998	1 November 1999	1 year, 88 days	Paraguayan Army	
4		Almirante; Jose Ramon Ocampos Alfaro (?–2014)	1 November 1999	21 August 2000	294 days	Paraguayan Navy	
5		Almirante; Miguel Angel Candia Fleitas	21 August 2000	14 March 2001	205 days	Paraguayan Navy	
6		General de ejército Expedito Adriano Garrigoza Vera	14 March 2001	29 August 2003	2 years, 168 days	Paraguayan Army	
7		General de ejército Jose Key Kanazawa Gamarra	17 September 2003	28 November 2006	3 years, 72 days	Paraguayan Army	
8		General de ejército Bernardino Soto Estigarribia (born 1952)	28 November 2006	19 November 2008	1 year, 357 days	Paraguayan Army	
9		Contraalmirante; Cibar Benitez Caceres	19 November 2008	6 November 2009	352 days	Paraguayan Navy	
10		General de brigada Juan Oscar Velazquez Castillo	6 November 2009	20 September 2010	318 days	Paraguayan Army	
11		General de ejército Felipe Benicio Melgarejo Recalde	21 September 2010	10 September 2012	1 year, 356 days	Paraguayan Army	
12		General de fuerza aerea Miguel Christ Jacobs	10 September 2012	11 October 2013	1 year, 31 days	Paraguayan Air Force	
13		General de ejército Jorge Francisco Ramirez Gomez	11 October 2013	23 October 2014	1 year, 12 days	Paraguayan Army	
14		General de ejército Luis Gonzaga Garcete	23 October 2014	3 November 2016	2 years, 11 days	Paraguayan Army	
15		General de fuerza aerea Braulio Piris Rojas	3 November 2016	9 August 2017	279 days	Paraguayan Air Force	
16		Almirante; Hugo Milciades Scolari Pagliaro	9 August 2017	30 October 2018	1 year, 82 days	Paraguayan Navy	
17		General de fuerza aerea Eladio Casimiro González Aguilar	30 October 2018	13 October 2022	3 years, 348 days	Paraguayan Air Force	
18		General de ejército Óscar Arnaldo Cardozo	13 October 2022	Incumbent	4 years, 25 days	Paraguayan Army	
