= Military ranks of Paraguay =

The Military ranks of Paraguay are the military insignia used by the Armed Forces of Paraguay.

== Current ranks ==
=== Commissioned officer ranks ===
The rank insignia of commissioned officers.

Rank group	General / flag officers			Senior officers			Junior officers
Paraguayan Army
Paraguayan Army	General de ejército	General de división	General de brigada	Coronel	Teniente coronel	Mayor	Capitán	Teniente primero	Teniente	Subteniente
Paraguayan Navy
Paraguayan Navy	Almirante	Vicealmirante	Contraalmirante	Capitán de navío	Capitán de fragata	Capitán de corbeta	Teniente de navio	Teniente de fragata	Teniente de corbeta	Guardiamarina
Paraguayan Air Force
Paraguayan Air Force	General de fuerza aerea	General de división	General de brigada	Coronel	Teniente coronel	Mayor	Capitán	Teniente primero	Teniente	Subteniente
Rank group	General / flag officers			Senior officers			Junior officers

=== Other ranks ===
The rank insignia of non-commissioned officers and enlisted personnel.

Rank group	Senior NCOs							Junior NCOs		Enlisted
Paraguayan Army
Paraguayan Army	Sub-oficial principal	Sub-oficial mayor	Sub-oficial	Sargento ayudante	Sargento primero	Vice sargento primero	Sargento segundo	Cabo primero	Cabo segundo	Soldado
Paraguayan Navy										No insignia
Paraguayan Navy	Sub-oficial principal	Sub-oficial mayor			Sub-oficial de primera	Sub-oficial de segunda	Maestre	Cabo primero	Cabo segundo	Dragoneante
(Paraguay) Paraguayan Air Force
(Paraguay) Paraguayan Air Force	Sub-oficial principal	Sub-oficial mayor	Sub-oficial	Sargento ayudante	Sargento primero	Vice sargento primero	Sargento segundo	Cabo primero	Cabo segundo	Soldado
Rank group	Senior NCOs							Junior NCOs		Enlisted

== Historical ranks ==
Historically, until the fall of the Stroessner regime, Paraguayan insignia were based on the Prussian system, as was the case for many other South American countries, only with slight distinctions.

Two individuals held the rank of Field Marshal of the Paraguayan Armies, the highest distinction in the nation. They were Francisco Solano López (during his own lifetime) and José Félix Estigarribia (awarded after his death). However, the rank itself is just a honorific title and does not officially belong to the ranks of the Paraguayan Army.

Both Francisco Solano López and José Félix Estigarribia had the "official" rank of General of the Army (General de Ejército).

=== 1954 – 1989 ===
Officers

Designation	Higher commanders			Senior commanders			Middle-level commanders
Paraguay
	General de ejército	General de división	General de brigada	Coronel	Teniente coronel	Mayor	Capitán	Teniente primero	Teniente

Enlisted
