= José Bozzano =

Paraguayan Navy officer, war hero, and engineer

José Alfredo Bozzano Baglietto
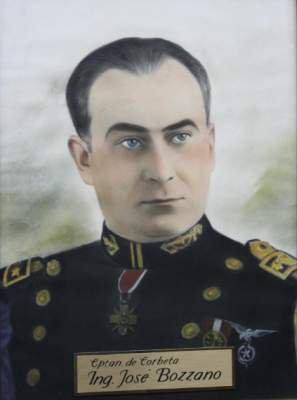
- Born: December 7, 1895; Asunción, Paraguay
- Died: December 14, 1969 (aged 74); Asuncion, Paraguay
- Spouse: Virginia Cardozo
- Children: Negra Bozzano de Llamosas
- Engineering career
- Projects: Humaitá-class gunboat
- Awards: Cruz del Chaco

José Alfredo Bozzano Baglietto (Asunción, Paraguay, December 7, 1895 – December 14, 1969) was a military engineer and senior officer of the Paraguayan Navy who designed the famous gunboats Paraguay and Humaitá that were used during the Chaco War in the key role of armed transport ships. In the course of the war, he was the manager of the factories which produced weapons, ammunition, trucks and other equipment for the Paraguayan Army.

== Life ==
José Alfredo Bozzano Baglietto was born on December 7, 1895, in the Asunción neighborhood of San Jerónimo, "just fifty metres from the Dockyards", which at that time were located there. The birth date is contained in official documents and was confirmed by his grandson, engineer Luis Lamas Bozzano, curiously because he gave another date (1899) "to remove a few years; pure coquetry", as stated at times his wife, Mrs. Virginia Cardozo Bozzano, who in turn was the daughter of educator Ramon Indalecio Cardozo and sister of politician Efraím Cardozo. His parents were the Genoese ship owner José Bozzano and the Argentine citizen Benedicta Baglietto. Bozzano spoke Italian, English, French and Guaraní fluently and had extensive knowledge of classical Greek and Latin. He read Stefan Zweig, Emerson, Kant, Schiller and Goethe. His favorite Paraguayan writers were Manuel Domínguez, Cecilio Báez, Fariña Eloy Núnez, Carlos Zubizarreta and Rubén Bareiro Saguier. He learned piano with Nicolino Pellegrini. Bozzano lingered on Chopin and enjoyed Paraguayan music (his favorite song was Ñasaindypé, composed by Félix Férnandez and José Asunción Flores).

== Education ==
Bozzano was educated at the Colegio Nacional at Asunción, studying the career of lawyer until the third year. He joined the Paraguayan Navy as midshipman on September 21, 1917. Since April 1918 he served in the state-owned national dockyards.

In May 1920, the government of José P. Montero (1919–1920) sent him to the United States for further studies of naval engineering. He attended the Massachusetts Institute of Technology. In 1924, Bozzano graduated as a naval architect and engineer. He went on to graduate school and in 1925 received a master's degree in aviation engineering.

Bozzano returned to Paraguay during the constitutional government of Eligio Ayala (1924–1928). On March 9, 1925, he was appointed director of the national dockyards, by decree nº 20297. In March 1927, president Ayala commissioned him to Europe for ordering the construction of two gunboats for the Navy that would protect the Paraguay River in the imminent war with Bolivia. Bozzano departed with the plans that he himself had traced.

After contacts with shipyards in England and Germany, the gunboats were eventually ordered from the Italian Odero Terni Orlando shipyard in Genoa. The two vessels, Paraguay and Humaitá, arrived in Paraguay on May 5, 1931. On December 28 of that year, Bozzano returned to the direction of the national dockyards.

== Chaco War ==
The dockyards produced more than 300,000 hand grenades, the famous carumbe `i (Guaraní for "little turtle"), which, for the pride of Paraguayans in the war, proved more effective than the Belgian designed SIP grenades, used by the Bolivian army) and built and assembled the coachworks of 2,308 trucks (at a rate of five per hour). The dockyards also produced 25,000 mortar grenades and 7,500 aerial bombs. Another of his feats was the making of mortar tubes with 23 columns from old trams. At the same time, 4,300 iron bars and wooden tables were made for stretchers, stoves, autoclaves and even trepans for cranial surgery. Bozzano's factories also built equipment for the vital water well drilling in the Chaco. Another milestone in the dockyard's war effort was the reverse engineering of 15 cipher machines from a model bought in an undisclosed "European country".

There were 4,400 truck drivers from the Paraguayan navy in the Chaco under the command of Captain Bozzano. He was appointed acting director of the military aviation on March 7, 1933, replacing Argentine World War I veteran pilot Vicente Almandos Almonacid.

== Works and awards ==
He left a brief but very valuable book of memories, Reminiscences, which recalls the history of the dockyards in the war. It started as an essay made at the request of Justo Pastor Benítez, who thought to include it in one of his historical works, but ended up being a book by its own value.

Bozzano was a Paraguayan officer heavily trained in science and technology. The design of Paraguay and Humaitá caused admiration in Britain. From 1932 to 1935 he commanded a force of 6,000 workers who forged the iron that was decisive for the outcome of the war.

When the conflict was over, Bozzano was awarded the Cruz del Chaco ("Chaco Cross"). He continued to serve to his country in different positions. During the government of Félix Paiva (1937–1939), Bozzano was appointed Minister of War and Navy on April 12, 1938, and then Minister of Economy on October 14, 1938. He also served as mayor of Asunción and a teacher at the School of Mathematics and Physical Sciences (School of Engineering) in the National University of Asunción.

The government decree that awarded him the Cruz del Chaco described captain José Bozzano as "one of the most authentic craftsmen of victory".

== Death ==
The last years of his life were spent working in the family owned shipyard at Varadero, Asunción. Captain Bozzano died on December 14, 1969.
