= ARP Paraguay =

Humaitá-class gunboat of the Paraguayan Navy

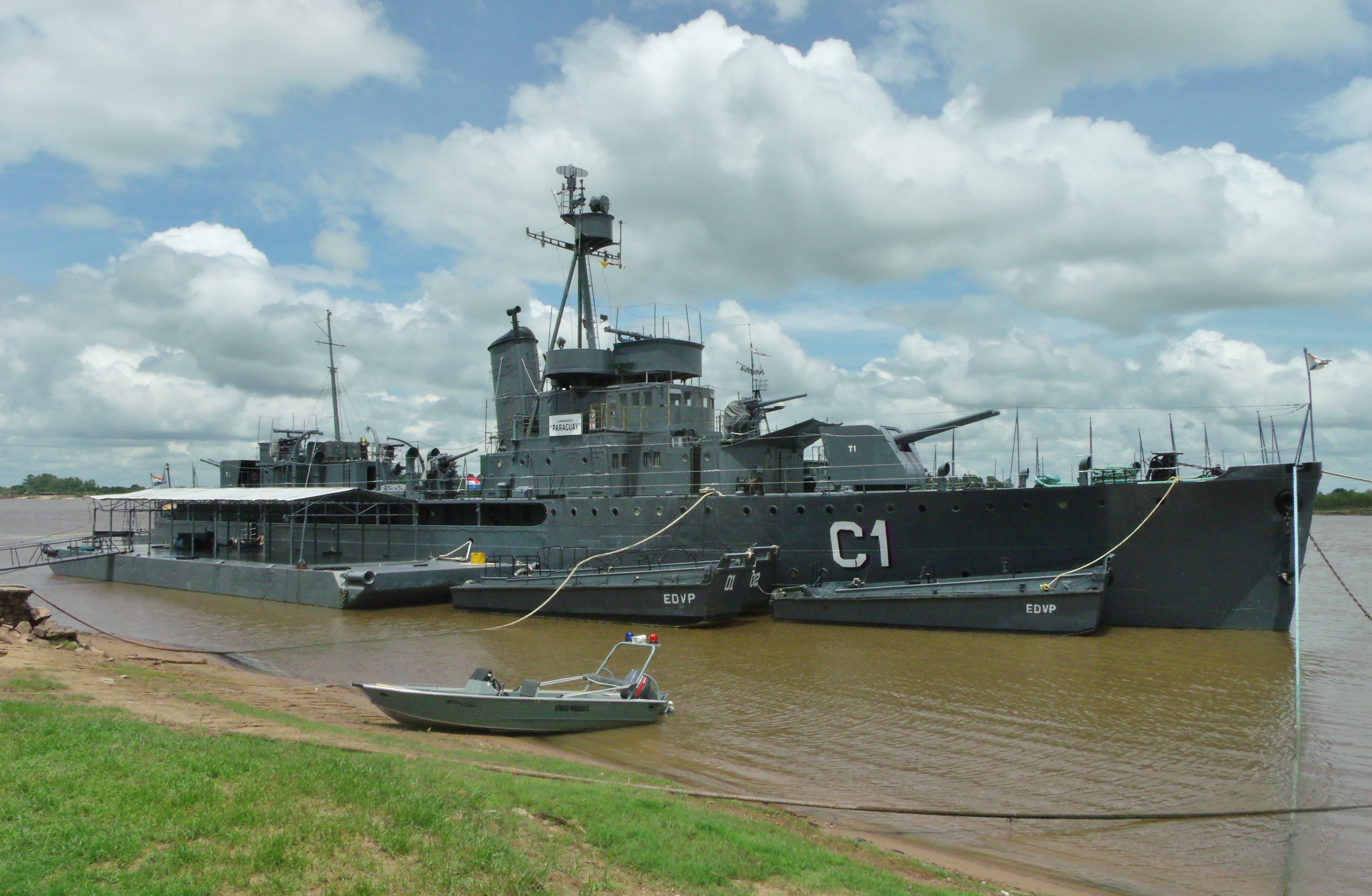
- ARP Paraguay in 2016

History

Paraguay
- Name: Paraguay
- Builder: Cantieri navali Odero (Sestri Ponente, Genoa)
- Laid down: 12 April 1929
- Launched: 22 June 1930
- Commissioned: 21 January 1931
- Identification: Pennant number: C1
- Fate: since 1972 serves as hulk

General characteristics
- Class & type: Humaitá-class river gunboat
- Displacement: full: 835 t (822 long tons); maximum: 1,050 t (1,030 long tons)
- Length: 71.2 m (233 ft 7 in)
- Draft: 1.67–2.13 m (5 ft 6 in – 7 ft 0 in)
- Propulsion: 2 x 1500 hp – 2 Parsons-type steam turbines
- Speed: 17 kn (31 km/h; 20 mph)
- Range: 2,822 nmi (5,226 km; 3,247 mi)
- Complement: 242 (during wartime); 151 (during peacetime); 96 (skeleton crew); up to 1,200 passengers
- Armament: 4 guns of 120 mm caliber; 3 guns of 76 mm caliber; 2 anti-aircraft guns of 40 mm caliber; 6 naval mines

Paraguay is a Humaitá-class river gunboat of the Paraguayan Navy. Launched in 1930, it participated in the Chaco War, transporting soldiers to the front. After the war, it took part in numerous coups d'état. In 1972, it was withdrawn from the Armada Nacional as a combat ship and has since served as a training and representational hulk.

== History of creation ==
President of Paraguay, Eligio Ayala, decided in 1927 to expand the navy. The reason was the growing conflict with Bolivia over the Gran Chaco territories, which had been ongoing intermittently since 1887. The plan for the new units was prepared by Navy officer José Bozzano. The ships were designed to operate on rivers against both air and ground targets, emphasizing shallow draft and a significant number of deck guns at the expense of armor and mobility. Negotiations were conducted with Denmark, Italy, France, and the United Kingdom. An agreement for the delivery of two gunboats, amounting to 1.25 million USD, was signed on 26 September 1928 with an Italian supplier.

=== Construction ===
The keel for the ship was laid on 21 April 1929 at the Cantieri navali Odero shipyard in Genoa. It was built under the name Comodoro Meza. The launch took place on 22 June 1930. The name of the gunboat was changed on 30 July 1930 to Paraguay.

== Description ==
=== Hull ===
The displacement of the empty ship was 621 tons; after being equipped and supplied with 170 tons of fuel, the displacement increased to 835 tons. The vessel could additionally carry up to 215 tons of cargo. The gunboat had a length of 71.2 m and a width of 10.5 m. An important design feature was the shallow draft of the hull, which was 4.4 m high. When equipped, the vessel had a draft of 180 cm, which increased to 213 cm when fully loaded. The midsection of the Paraguay was protected by a 15-millimeter-thick belt, the command post had 20 mm, and the gun shields had 10 mm of armor.

=== Propulsion ===
The gunboat was powered by two Parsons-type steam turbines, each with a power output of 1,500 hp. (Note: Brescia (1999, p. 29) provides a total of 3,800 hp.) Initially, the vessel was equipped with two Thornycroft-Shultz type boilers, which were later replaced with Yarrow boilers, both types having a working pressure of 18 kg/cm². The ship was propelled by two screws. The maximum speed it could achieve was 17 knots, with an economical speed of 12 knots. At maximum speed, the Paraguay could cover 2,822 nautical miles.

=== Armament ===
The main deck artillery on the gunboat consisted of 4 Ansaldo 1926 model 120 mm guns mounted in pairs in two turrets, and three 76 mm guns (most likely Ansaldo 1917) manufactured by Odero-Terni in La Spezia. Anti-aircraft defense was provided by two QF 2-pounder naval guns produced under Vickers license. The vessel had one mine track and was typically armed with six Vickers H MK II naval mines. During the Chaco War, six heavy machine guns were additionally installed. In 1968, two 20 mm anti-aircraft guns were mounted on the bridge but were later removed.

==== Comparison of Paraguay's naval artillery specifications ====
Caliber	120 mm	76 mm	40 mm
Elevation	-5°/+45°	-5°/+85°	-5°/+80°
Horizontal range	20,900 m	15,000 m	7,160 m
Anti-aircraft range	–	9,400 m	4,425 m
Rate of fire	3.75 shots per minute	10 shots per minute	200 shots per minute
Initial projectile velocity	800 m/s	900 m/s	610 m/s
Shell weight (projectile)	45 kg (Note: Ehlers (2010, p. 72, part. III) provides this value as the weight of the projectile; however, the terms cartridge and projectile are used interchangeably in this publication.) (23.15 kg)	9.5 kg (3.5 kg)	1.315 kg (0.9 kg)
Ammo supply (maximum)	200 (1,000)	200 (1,200)	1,000 (6,000)

=== Crew ===
The crew allocation on the Paraguay during the war was 15 officers, 18 non-commissioned officers, and 209 sailors. In peacetime, the number of non-commissioned officers and sailors was reduced to 12 and 124, respectively. The ship could additionally carry 900 equipped soldiers or 1,200 people without heavy equipment. As of 2010, the gunboat had a skeleton crew of 96 people. (Note: Dobrzelewski (2012, p. 148) states the crew of the gunboat during the Chaco War as 86 people, which would be a smaller number than the current skeleton crew.)

=== Identification ===
Since the Humaitá and Paraguay were structurally identical, stripes on the funnel were used to distinguish the gunboats – Paraguay received two stripes (while Humaitá received one stripe). Additionally, the identification number C1 was painted on the hull of the vessel.

== Service ==
=== Beginning ===
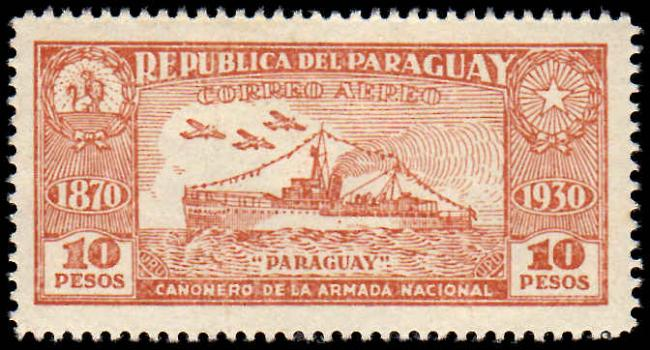
Postage stamp depicting the gunboat Paraguay

The flag was raised on Paraguay and its sister ship Humaitá on 21 January 1931, and 23 days later, the ships set sail for their homeland with a mixed Paraguayan-Italian crew. Paraguay reached Asunción on May 5 and officially joined the Armada Nacional as the flagship on May 13, based on Decree No. 40.178. The gunboat was incorporated into the Flotilla de Guerra by Decree No. 40.220 on 20 May 1931. Before the outbreak of the war, it only managed to make a trial voyage to Puerto Casado, starting on 24 August 1931. On the return journey, Paraguay ran aground at Piquente Cambá, but it managed to free itself without damage after 28 days. At the outbreak of the war, Humaitá and Paraguay formed the modern core of the Paraguayan Navy.

=== Chaco War ===
The main task of the fleet during the war was troop transport. Ships departed from Asunción loaded with soldiers and equipment to Puerto Casado, from where reinforcements reached the front by trucks or continued their journey by river to Bahía Negra. On the return trip, they transported wounded and Bolivian prisoners. Paraguay embarked on its first transport mission on 5 August 1932. In 4 months and 17 days, it made ten trips, transporting 10,301 soldiers and 160 tons of other cargo to the front and bringing 2,009 Paraguayans and 188 Bolivian prisoners to the capital. According to official data, the gunboat made a total of 81 trips on the Paraguay River, transporting 51,867 soldiers to Puerto Casado. Ehlers states that it made 84 round trips, transporting about 267,000 people along with its sister ship. (Note: Dobrzelewski (2012, p. 150) provides this number as the total of soldiers transported by all Paraguayan watercraft.) The gunboats also provided anti-aircraft cover for unarmed vessels and served as anti-aircraft batteries in Asunción and Puerto Casado between convoys.

=== Peacetime rebellions ===
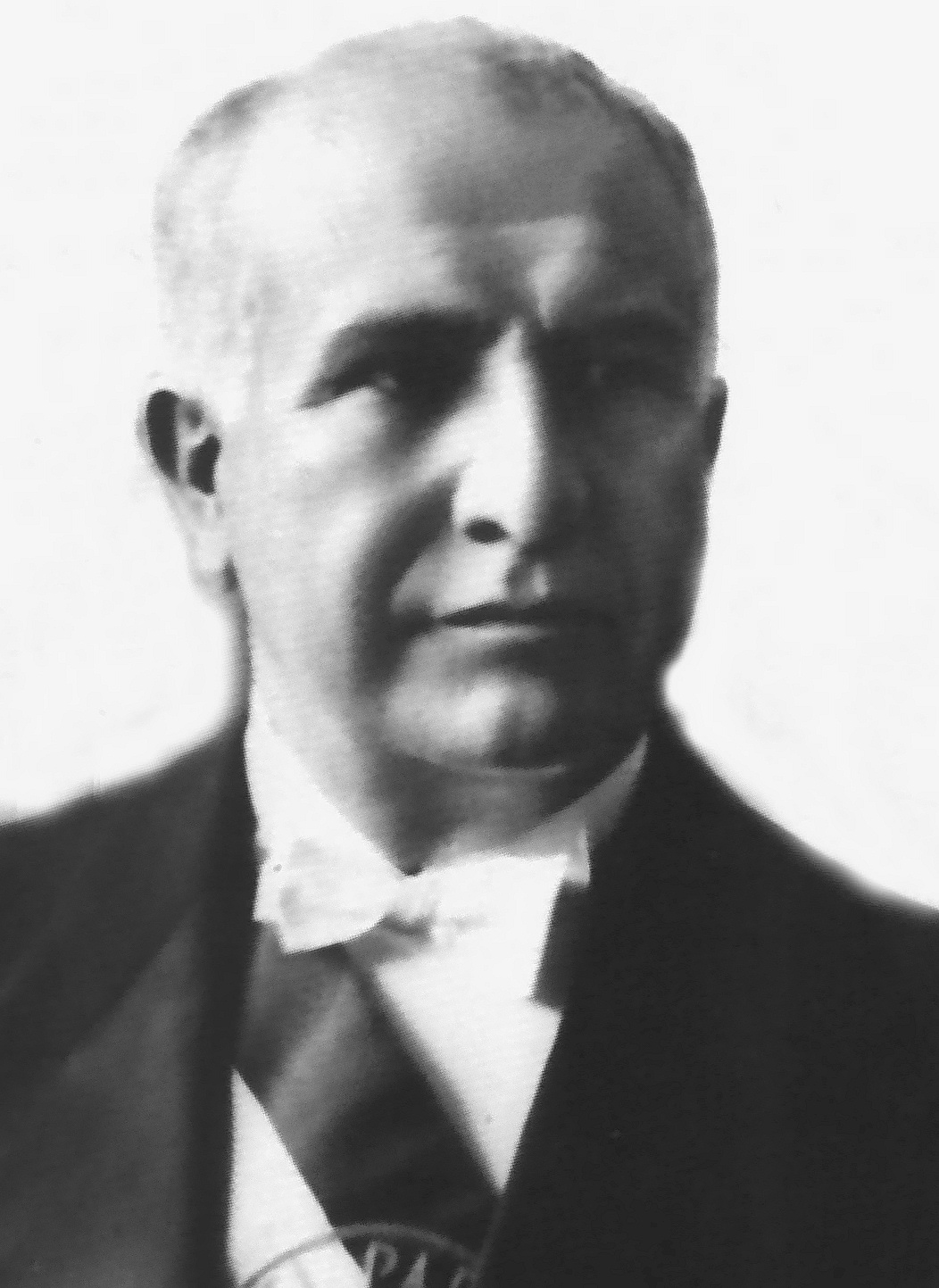
Eusebio Ayala

The first rebellion involving Paraguay was the coup d'état by Colonel Rafael Franco on 17 February 1936. (Note: Ehlers (2004) provides the date as February 27.) President Eusebio Ayala took refuge on board. Initially, the navy supported forces loyal to the president, but when the situation turned against him, the highest commanders declared Ayala their prisoner.

The gunboat underwent a refit in Buenos Aires in 1937 and another, combined with maneuvers, in 1941. During World War II, due to a fuel shortage, the ship did not undertake significant activity. It was stationed at the Sajonia base and only left during Fleet Week.

In 1947, both gunboats underwent their third refit in Buenos Aires. During this time (March 7), another coup took place in Paraguay. The rebellion also spread to the ships stationed in Argentina – on May 7, supporters of the Febreristas arrested government-loyal crew members on Paraguay, resulting in 4 injuries. Since the ships had left for refit without combat equipment, they went to Uruguay, where they received modest armament. (Note: It consisted of 8 shells for the main guns of the units, 7 machine guns, and 250 rifles.) The ships began their journey to Paraguay via the Paraná River on July 5, crossing the Paraguayan border at Paso de Patria five days later. Humaitá was hit by an aerial bomb the day before and ran aground near the Argentine city of Ituzaingó on July 12. Paraguay stayed with its sister gunboat, and both were attacked by government aircraft. Uninvolved ships Capitán Cabral and Mariscal Estigarribia and steamers Helen Gunther and Tirador arrived at the gunboats' location on July 15. Three days later, Humaitá was shelled from the land, the air attacks continued, and on July 24 and 25, the entrenched gunboat crews were attacked from land and water. Rising river levels allowed the gunboats to attempt a breakout, but it was thwarted by Alfredo Stroessner's forces. The gunboats found refuge in the Argentine Itá Ibaté, where they were interned until the end of the fighting.

In September 1955, a military coup took place in Argentina, overthrowing president Juan Perón. During this time, Paraguay was in Buenos Aires, and Perón took refuge on the Paraguayan gunboat until he was flown to Asunción on October 2.

Paraguay underwent modernization in Rio de Janeiro in 1968. The ship, equipped with radar and additional anti-aircraft artillery, suffered a bow boiler fire the same year. The fire also damaged the second boiler and turbines. Due to the damage, the ship was decommissioned as a combat vessel in 1972 and repurposed for representational and training functions as a stationary unit (hulk). It underwent repairs in 1975, 1980, and 1993.

==== Repairs and modernizations of Paraguay ====
Location	Date	Notes
Buenos Aires	1937	
Buenos Aires	1941 (until August 17)	combined with maneuvers
Buenos Aires	1947 (until May 5)	interrupted by the rebellion
Buenos Aires	1955	provided refuge for Perón
Rio De Janeiro	1968	installation of radar and AA artillery
Asunción	1975	

== Bibliography ==
- Ehlers, Hartmut (2004). "Kanonierki Paraguay i Humaitá". Okręty Wojenne (in Polish). 2 (64). Tarnowskie Góry. ISSN 1231-014X.
- Ehlers, Hartmut (2010). "Marynarka Wojenna Paragwaju". Okręty Wojenne (in Polish). 1, 3 (99, 101). Tarnowskie Góry. ISSN 1231-014X.
- Dobrzelewski, Jarosław (2012). Wojna o Gran Chaco 1932–1935. Bitwy/Taktyka (in Polish). Zabrze: Wydawnictwo inforteditions. ISBN 978-83-64023-00-2.
- Campbell, John (1985). Naval weapons of World War Two. Annapolis: Naval Institute Press. ISBN 0-87021-459-4.
- Brescia, Maurizio (1999). "Huamitá e Paraguay". Storia Millitare (in Italian). 69. Archived from the original on 2014-09-11.
