= Armed Forces of Paraguay =

Combined military forces of Paraguay

Armed Forces of the Nation
- Fuerzas Armadas de la Nación
- Paraguayan Coat of Arms
- Motto: Vencer o morir ("Win or die")
- Service branches: Paraguayan Army; Paraguayan Air Force; Paraguayan Navy
- Website: ffmm.mil.py

Leadership
- Commander-in-chief: President Santiago Peña
- Minister of Defense: General EJ (R) Oscar Luis González Cañete.
- Commander of the Armed Forces: General of the Army Óscar Arnaldo Cardozo

Personnel
- Military age: 18
- Active personnel: 15,650 active military (2016); 14,800 paramilitary (2012)
- Reserve personnel: 168,500 (2012)

Expenditure
- Budget: $326 million (2025)
- Percent of GDP: 0,74% (2025)

Industry
- Foreign suppliers: Brazil; Canada; China (Formerly); European Union; France; India; Israel; Taiwan; Italy; Japan; Russia; United States

Related articles
- Ranks: Military ranks of Paraguay

The Armed Forces of Paraguay (Spanish: Fuerzas Armadas de Paraguay) officially the Armed Forces of the Nation (Spanish: Fuerzas Armadas de la Nación) consist of the Paraguayan army, Paraguayan navy (including naval aviation and marine corps) and air force.

The constitution of Paraguay establishes the president of Paraguay as the commander-in-chief.

Paraguay has compulsory military service, and all 18-year-old males and 17-year-olds in the year of their 18th birthday are liable for one year of active duty. The 1992 constitution allows for conscientious objection to obligatory military service, it was legislated and sanctioned by both chambers of the Congress, to be promulgated by the Executive Power on June the 17th of 2010. This law is known as Law number 4013/10 "That established the exercise of the right to conscientious objection to obligatory military service and establishes the substitute service for it for the benefit of the civilian population".

In July 2005, military aid in the form of U.S. Special Forces began arriving at Paraguay's Mariscal Estigarribia air base, a sprawling complex built in 1982.

== Army ==
In land forces the Paraguayan Army is composed of a Presidential Guards Regiment, composed two battalions (infantry and military police), an armored squadron, and a battery of field artillery, plus the operationally attached Mounted Ceremonial Squadron "Aca Caraya" (which serves independently but as the mounted escort in state events, and serves as part of the 4th Cavalry Regiment). Their equipment includes three Argentinean modified M-4 tanks, four EE-9 armored cars, four EE-11 armored personnel carriers (APCs), three M-9 half-tracks mounting 20mm guns, and four M-101 105 mm howitzers. Arguably, this "flagship" of military rule is structurally and physically the strongest of the EP. The REP is an independent unit from other commands. The EP features two artillery groups (GAC 1–12 88 mm QF-25 and GAC 2–12 105mm M-101) and one antiaircraft artillery group (GAA 13 40 mm L 40/60, Oerlikon 20 mm cannons, and six M-55 4x12, 7.0 mm).

Six battalions of combat engineers, one communications battalion, one Special Forces battalion, seven regiments of infantry, six regiments of cavalry (R.C.-2 equipped with 12 M3A1, five operational, 20 M9 half-tracks modernized and R.C.-3: 24 EE-9 Cascavels, eight EE-11 Urutu APCs plus utility trucks for motorized infantry). This has little organic aviation available to it.

Each corps has a weapons school run by its command. The logistical command manages 10 addresses materials, mobilization, health care, etc. The command of the Army Institute of Education administers three schools, commissioned and noncommissioned officers, a military academy, and the CIMEFOR (a center for pre-military study that trains Reserve officers).

Each of the nine divisions that make up the three corps has one or two regiments of infantry or cavalry, its platoon of engineers, its communications section, military police units, etc.

== Navy ==
Naval Jack of Paraguay

Although Paraguay is a landlocked country, it has a strong naval tradition by virtue of the fact that it has access to the Atlantic Ocean through the Paraguay–Paraná rivers. The Paraguayan Navy has twelve bases. The main base is the Puerto Sajonia in Asunción, followed by Bahia Negra, Ciudad del Este, Encarnacion, Salto del Guaira. It also has facilities in Puerto Sajonia for helicopters and airplanes in SGAS. Naval personnel including Marine Corps aviation personnel, and the naval inward waters prefecture equal about 8,950. The Marine Corps have 800 marines, of which 400 are assigned to one commando unit with the rest being organized into a single battalion consisting of three companies.

In terms of vessels, the Navy has 34 surface ships, some of which have reached centenarian age. (This is due in part to limited use and floating in fresh water.) The main vessels and the flagship of the Paraguay Navy is still Paraguay, which was commissioned prior to Paraguay's involvement in the Chaco War. It has a further four patrol vessels, of which the oldest was commissioned in 1908 and the newest in 1985. The Navy has 17 patrol boats of various drafts, four of which were donated by Taiwan and the United States, while the other 13 were built locally. The rest of the fleet is composed of tugboats, barges, landing craft, transports, and a presidential yacht. The new additions are four Croc-class riverine vessels from Australia, plus 43 locally built riverline patrol vessels constructed from 2006 to 2009. For air support, one Helibras HB350 helicopter is used to provide SAR, MEDEVAC and utility work

Paraguay (C1) has a sister ship, Humaita (C2), that was turned into a museum ship after she ceased operations in 1983, but hasn't functioned as such this last decade. Humaita is in poor shape. (ABC Color News, 12/28/22)

=== Order of battle ===
COMANFLOT: Comando de la Flota de Guerra.(Fleet Forces Command)

COMIM: Comando de Infantería de Marina.(Fleet Marine Command)

- Marine Forces Regiment
  - BIM 1 - Rosario
  - BIM 2 - Vallemi
  - BIM 3 - Carapegua
  - Marine Commando Battalion
- COMAVAN(Naval Aviation Command)

Grupo Aeronaval de Helicópteros (GAHE), Sajonia

Escuadrilla de Helicópteros de Ataque (EHA)

Escuadrilla de Propósitos Generales (EPG)

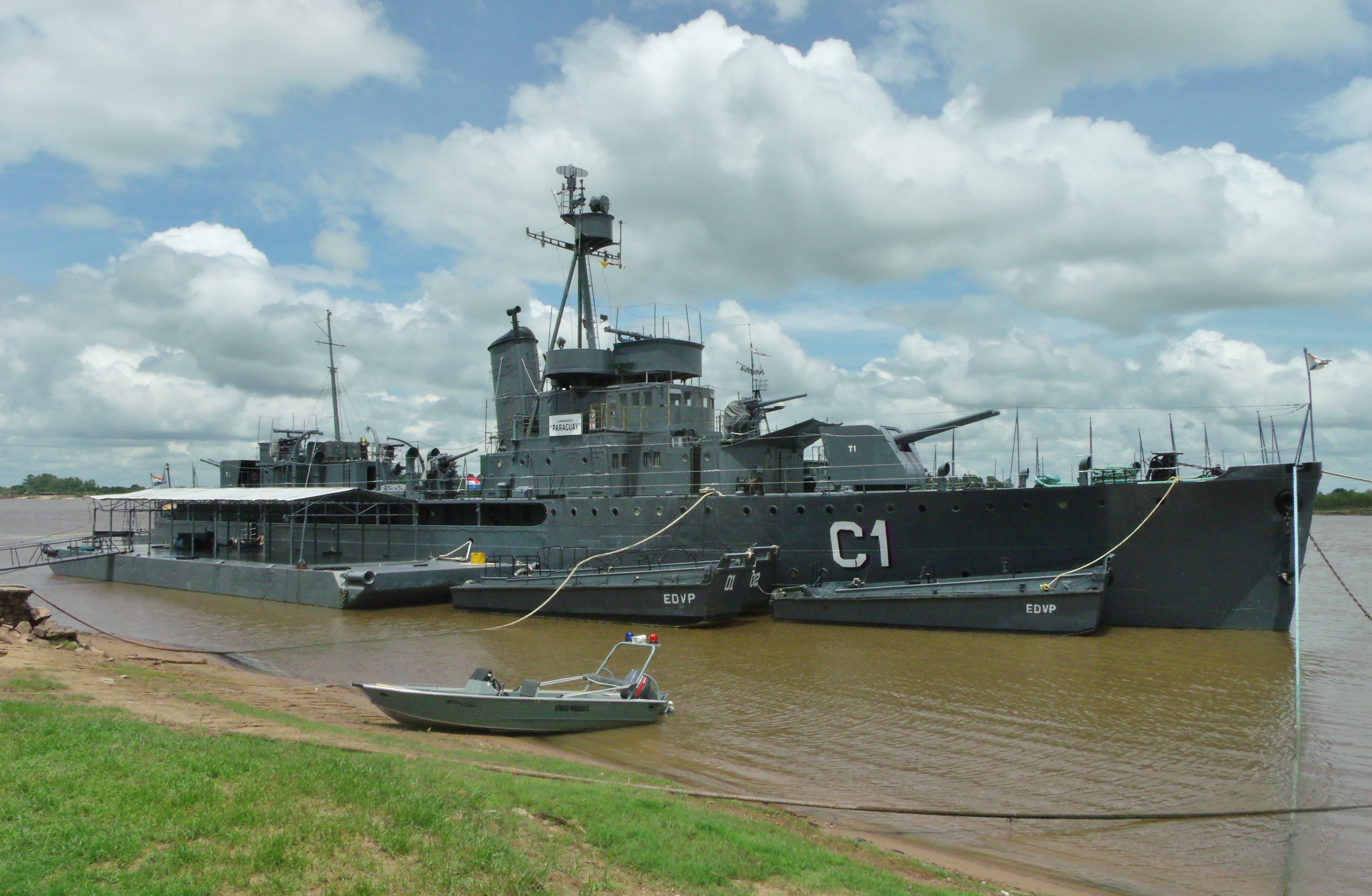
Flagship, River gunboat ARP C-1 Paraguay

Grupo Aeronaval de Propósitos Generales (GAPROGEN)

Grupo Aeronaval de Entrenamiento (GAEN)

- COAPCOM: Comando de Apoyo al Combate.(Combat Support Command)
- CINAE: Comando de Institutos Navales y Enseñanza. (Naval Education and Training Command)
- PGN: Prefectura General Naval.(General Naval Prefecture)

Cuartel General (Command)

Estado Mayor (HQ)

Prefectura Zona Pilar (Pilar Naval Prefecture)

Prefectura Zona Alberdi (Alberdi Naval Prefecture)

Prefectura Zona Central (Central Naval Prefecture)

Prefectura Zona Concepcion (Cencepcion Naval Prefecture)

Prefectura Zona Olimpo (Olimpo Naval Prefecture)

- DIRMAT: Dirección del Material (Material Directorate)
- DIAPSER: Dirección de Apoyo al Servicio (Service Support Directorate)

As of 2022, the Commander of the Paraguayan Navy is Rear Admiral Carlos Diaz. He is "Contraalmirante, Comandante de la Flota de Guerra de la Armada". (ABC Color, 12/28/22: "Gunboat 'Humaita' returns to its normal position after worrying inclination")

== Air Force ==
Air Force roundel

The air force, the newest and smallest of the services, has about 1,100 personnel as of 2012. The Paraguayan Air Forces is organised in an Air Brigade of seven air groups and a brigade of paratroopers on battalion level. Almost all operating units are based in or around the Silvio Pettirossi International Airport (SGAS) in Asunción.

The units comprising the force are: the Aerotactico group (TAG) with three fighter squadrons (numbered 1 to 3), respectively equipped with the MB-326, T-33 and EMB-312. The first two are not in operation, due to the withdrawal of their aircraft. The squadron "Moros", equipped with Tucanos, has only one squadrille (3 airplanes active). The Air Transport Group (GTA) operates aircraft of the CASA, DHC-6, and Beechcraft types. The Helicopter air group (HLG) has a SAR squadron, a utility squadron, and a squadron of attack craft, and is equipped with ex-Taiwanese UH-1H and Brazilian HB-350B aircraft. The Air Group Instruction (AFI) has T-25 and T-35 aircraft. Photogrammetric called air group (GAF) and group aviation maintenance section (SEMAER) do not have aircraft assigned. The Parachute Brigade operates CASA aircraft.

Besides these groups is a command of Institutes of Education and one of regions air, this latter has nominal jurisdiction over 12 tracks and airports as six of these are considered Air Bases.

Per Arasunu (December 2021-No. XVI), the magazine of the PAF, the current organizational structure:

- Comandante Interino de la Fuerza Aerea Paraguaya (CC-Gral Div Aer) -- Jefe del Estado Mayor General de la Fuerza Aerea Paraguaya (CV-Gral Div Aer) --- Comandante de la Brigada Aerea (Gral Brig Aer) --- Comandante del Comando de Regiones Aereas (Gral Brig Aer) --- Comandante Interino de la Brigada Aerotransportada "SP" (CNEL DCEM) --- Comandante Interino del Comando de Instituteos Aeronauticos de Ensenanza (CNEL DCEM) --- Comandante Interino de la Brigada Logistica (CNEL DCEM)

The current PAF/CC is Arturo Javier Gonzalez Ocampo. The PAF/CV is Ruben Dario Piris Fernandez.

=== Order of battle ===
- 1º Brigada Aérea (Air Brigade; Asunción/Base Aérea Ñu Guazú)
  - Grupo Aerotáctico (Air Tactical Group; Asunción/Base Aérea Pettirossi)
  - 1º Escuadrón de Caza 'Guaraní' (Escuadrilla 'Orion' y 'Centauro'), no longer active
  - 2º Escuadrón de Caza 'Indios' (Escuadrilla 'Taurus' y 'Scorpio'), no longer active
  - 3º Escuadrón de Reconocimiento y Ataque 'Moros' (Reconnaissance and Attack Squadron; Escuadrilla 'Gamma' y 'Omega'): EMB-312
  - Grupo Aéreo de Instrucción (Instrucción Air Group) 'Escuadrón Fenix': T-25A
  - Escuadrilla 'Antares' / 'Pantera' / 'Halcón': T-35A/B

== See also ==
- Francisco López Military Academy
- List of wars involving Paraguay
