= ARP Tacuary =

Riverine gunboat used by the Paraguayan Navy

- ARP Tacuary (1932)

History

Paraguay
- Name: Adolfo Riquelme (1911–1930); Tacuary (1930–1999)
- Namesake: A Paraguayan politician; Battle of Tacuari
- Ordered: 1907
- Builder: T. & J. Hosking, Scotland
- Commissioned: November 1911
- Decommissioned: November 1999
- Fate: Stricken 1999

General characteristics
- Type: Gunboat
- Displacement: 360 long tons (366 t)
- Length: 39.38 m (129 ft 2 in)
- Beam: 7.32 m (24 ft 0 in)
- Draught: 1.83 m (6 ft 0 in)
- Propulsion: 2 vertical compound steam engines 250 hp (186 kW)
- Speed: 10 knots (12 mph; 19 km/h)
- Complement: 55
- Armament: 2 × 76 mm (3.0 in); 2 × 37 mm (1.5 in) guns; 2 × machine guns

ARP Tacuary was a riverine gunboat in service on the Paraguayan Navy for almost a century. She was built in 1907 by T. & J. Hosking, Ireland, as the steel-hulled yacht Clover and initially named Adolfo Riquelme when acquired in 1911. From 1930 the ship bore the name of another gunboat, which was the first Paraguayan naval vessel to cross the Atlantic in 1855.

== History ==
=== Acquired by Paraguay ===
Clover arrived in Paraguay in November 1911 along with Constitución, a former ocean-going freighter converted into gunboat, and the transport General Díaz. The three ships had been bought to suppress an attempt in early 1911 to overthrow President Jara regime, but by that time the uprising was over. She was commissioned in the Paraguayan Navy as gunboat Adolfo Riquelme, named after a politician killed in March 1911 during the revolt against Jara.

=== Revolution of 1922 and upgrade ===
She was initially used as a training ship. During the revolution of 1922, however, Adolfo Riquelme was the lead ship of the loyalist flotilla. She shelled the town of Encarnación, on the Paraná River, which had been occupied by the rebels. The gunboat was lightly damaged by return fire on July. In September she shelled Encarnación again, this time to support the landing of 150 soldiers, who engaged the rebels and destroyed a railway section and telegraph lines before falling back to the loyalist beachhead. On 5 September the aviso Coronel Martínez sank a torpedo-carrying canoe that was in the process of attacking Adolfo Riquelme. She supported another landing in Caraguatá, and the next week she shelled the railway system along the Paraná. In the course of the revolution, she endured the attack of two rebel aircraft to no effect.

An upgrade in 1925 included modifications to her bridge and deck. Her funnel was also refitted in 1927. She was renamed Tacuary on 30 July 1930. She was laid up again in May 1931 for repairs to her keel and hastily relaunched on 28 July 1932 due to the beginning of the Chaco War with Bolivia.

=== Chaco War ===
Her first trip to the north took place on 5 August 1932 escorting the barges Irene and Bahía Negra, ferrying troops of the 3rd Artillery Group to the battle front. Tacuary arrived back in Asunción on 13 August where pending repairs were finished. She sailed again on 18 August. Tacuary then came under the command of the 3rd Army Division Headquarters at Bahía Negra. Her commander during this deployment was Captain Rodrigo Machuca.

==== Air defense of Bahía Negra ====
On 22 December 1932 at 11:00 AM, while at anchor at Bahía Negra (20°13′48″S 58°10′1″W) with her boilers shut down, Tacuary was attacked by two Bolivian CW-14 Osprey fighter bombers and one Curtiss P-6 Hawk that took off from Fortín Vitriones. Some sources claim that the attacking planes were actually three Vickers Vespa. The aircraft launched three bombs, one of which exploded only 20 m away from Tacuary. They regrouped over Brazilian territory for a second airstrike. They strafed and dropped six small bombs. During a third attack, again with six bombs and cannon fire, Tacuary hit one Osprey with a 37mm round. The Osprey split from the package, and trailing black smoke, eventually crashed on Brazilian territory, according to the Paraguayan report. Of the 15 bombs launched, 11 straddled the gunboat. The army commander of the Northern Sector, Colonel José Julian Sánchez, was killed during the attacks by a bomb splinter. Tacuary complement remained unscathed. The two surviving aircraft repeated the attack twice on 24 December, at 8:00 and 17:00 hrs, but were fought off without inflicting any mayor damage on the ship, which this time took evasive manoeuvres. The strafing, however, resulted in several wounded. The raids of 22 and 24 December left 29 splinter holes and 45 bullet holes on Tacuary´s hull. After these attacks, the crew used sheets and tree branches to camouflage the gunboat. Tacuary was relieved from her station at Bahía Negra by the scout Teniente Herreros. She continued with supply missions until the end of the war. As transport ship, Tacuary ferried 6,602 troops, 230 passengers, 480 prisoners, 1,258 animals, and 1,653 t of cargo.

=== After the War ===
Tacuary was used as transport ship up to 1938, when she was laid up in order to converting her into a Presidential yacht. The death of President José Félix Estigarribia halted these plans, and the former gunboat became a barge in the Naval Transport Service. From 1949 to 1966, the ship endured a lengthy refit, aimed to convert her in a passenger ship to operate between Asunción and Buenos Aires. In 1952 her old steam propulsion was replaced by two diesel engines. She was relaunched on 30 December 1966. She was in service as a transport ship until 1978. Tacuary was then re-listed as a cargo barge and was eventually stricken from the Paraguayan Navy list on 30 November 1999.

== See also ==
- Humaitá-class gunboat
