= General Paz Department =

General Paz Department Departamento General Paz (Spanish) Tetãvore Generál Páz (Guarani)
- Department
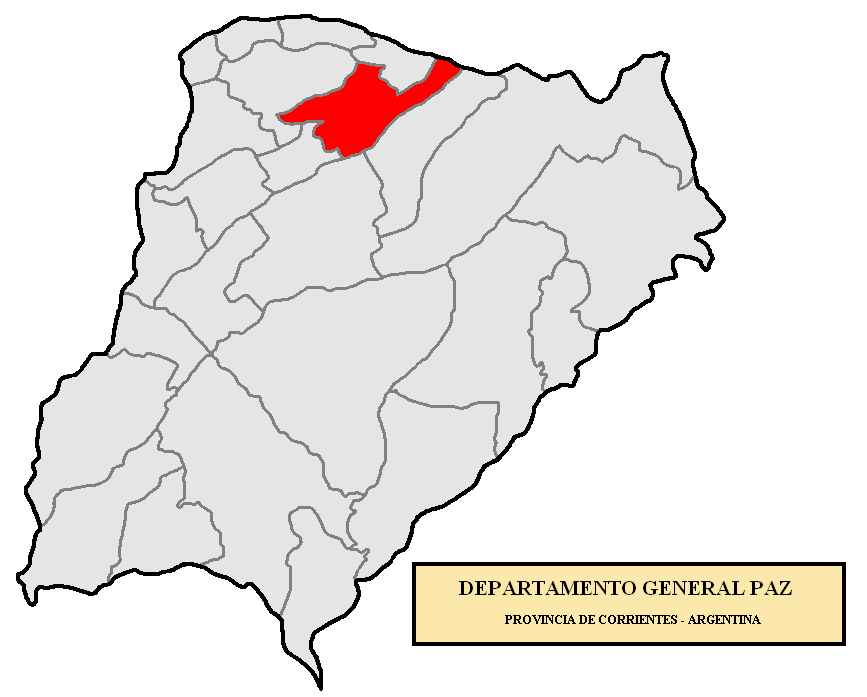
- location of General Paz Department in Corrientes Province
- Coordinates: 27°45′S 57°37′W
- Country: Argentina
- Seat: Caá Catí

Area
  - Total: 2,634 km^{2} (1,017 sq mi)

Population (2001 census [INDEC])
  - Total: 14,725
  - Density: 5.590/km^{2} (14.48/sq mi)
- Postal Code: W3403
- Area Code: 03781
- Website: www.caa-cati.com.ar

General Paz Department is a department of Corrientes Province in Argentina.

The provincial subdivision has a population of about 14,725 inhabitants in an area of 2,634 km^{2} (1,017 sq mi), and its capital city is Caá Catí.

== Settlements ==
- Caá Catí
- Itá Ibaté
- Lomas de Vallejos
- Palmar Grande
- Tacuaral
- Costa Santa Lucía
