= Mburucuyá Department =

Mburucuyá Department Departamento Mburucuyá (Spanish) Tetãvore Mburukuja (Guarani)
- Department
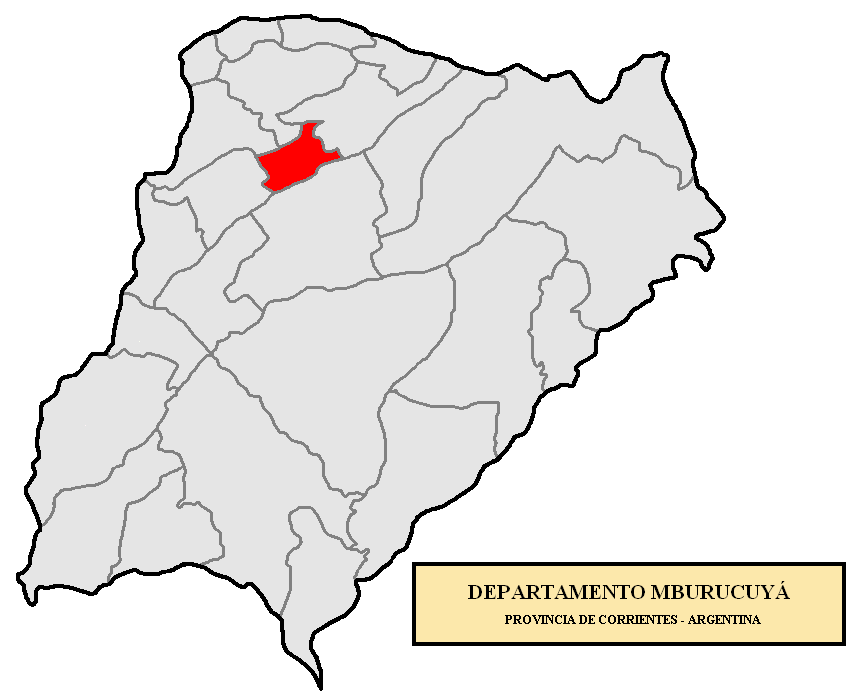
- location of Mburucuyá Department in Corrientes Province
- Coordinates: 28°03′S 58°13′W
- Country: Argentina
- Seat: Mburucuyá

Area
  - Total: 961 km^{2} (371 sq mi)

Population (2001 census [INDEC])
  - Total: 9,012
  - Density: 9.38/km^{2} (24.3/sq mi)
- Demonym: mburucuyense
- Postal Code: W3427
- Area Code: 03782

Mburucuyá Department is a department of Corrientes Province in Argentina.

The provincial subdivision has a population of about 9,012 inhabitants in an area of 961 km^{2} (371 sq mi), and its capital city is Mburucuyá, which is located around 1,010 km (630 mi) from Capital Federal (Buenos Aires).
