= Ferrocarril Económico Correntino =

Former Argentine State-owned railway lines (1892–1969)

Corrientes Economic Railway
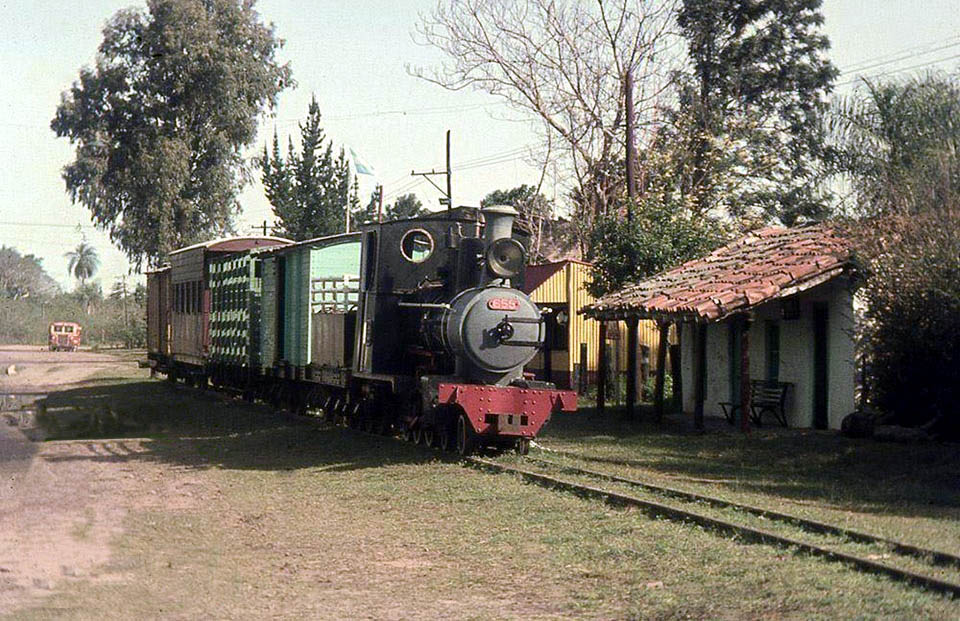
- Train at Santa Ana station

Overview
- Native name: Ferrocarril Económico Correntino
- Status: Defunct
- Owner: Government of Corrientes
- Locale: Corrientes Province
- Termini: Corrientes; Mburucuyá

Service
- Type: Inter-city
- Operator(s): List: Ingenio Primer Correntino (1892-1904); Carlos Dodero (1912-?); Government of Corrientes (1927-48); Ferrocarriles Argentinos (1948-69)

History
- Opened: 1892
- Closed: 1969; 56 years ago

Technical
- Line length: 220 km (140 mi)
- Track gauge: 600 mm (1 ft 11 5/8 in)
Route map
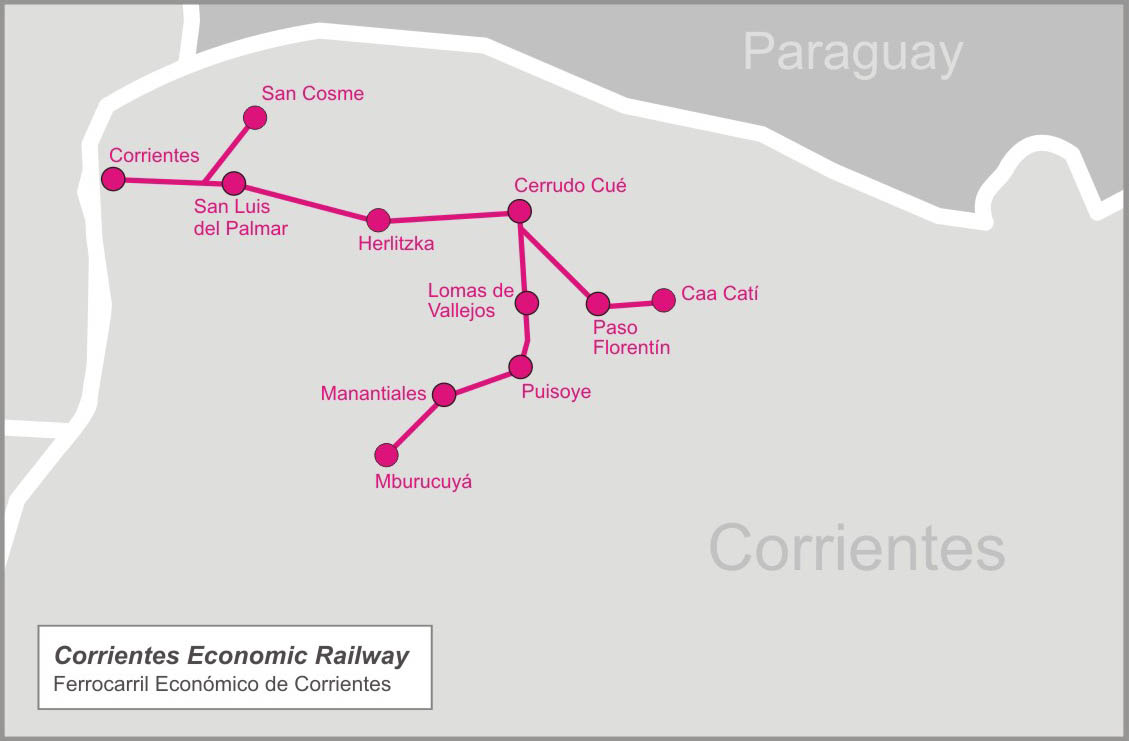

Ferrocarril Económico Correntino was the informal name for some former narrow gauge State-owned railway lines in Corrientes Province of Argentina that used a gauge of 600 mm (1 ft 11 5/8 in).

Railway locomotives used firewood as fuel, running at a maximum speed of 20 km/h, therefore a trip between Corrientes and Mburucuyá 178 kilometres (111 mi) in length took nearly 26 hours.

The first line, named "Ferrocarril Primer Correntino", operated from 1892 to 1904. After its closure part of the rail tracks were removed and the other part continued operating as a freight train for the sugar cane mill with the same name. The second line was "Compañía General de Ferrocarriles Económicos de la Provincia de Corrientes", added part of the previous railway operating from 1912 to 1927 when it was acquired by the Government of Corrientes and renamed "Ferrocarril Provincial de Corrientes".

With the railway Nationalisation in Argentina the FCEC was added to the General Urquiza Railway in 1948. The line was definitely closed in 1969 and its tracks lifted.

== History ==
=== The Bolla railway ===
Italian entrepreneur Francisco Bolla, owner of sugar cane mill "Ingenio Primer Correntino" had requested for a railway line to transport both, goods and passengers. On December 18, 1890, the Provincial Legislature promulgated a Law granted Bolla a concession to build and operate a railway line. The Law specified a 600mm-narrow gauge and the use of steam locomotives for the railway.

Law also granted Bolla's company the lands where the railway would be built, also exempting company from paying duties for a period of 30 years. For its part, the company had to run a minimum of three trains a week, whose fees would be established by the Government of Corrientes itself.

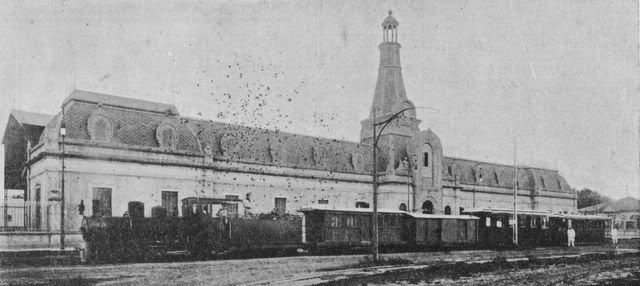
Corrientes station, terminus, c. 1900

The first section was built from Primer Correntino cane mill to San Luis del Palmar, being opened on September 23, 1892. Nevertheless, the Provincial Government realised that the company had extended the line from San Luis to the Arroyo Riachuelito and was constructing another branch to the city of Corrientes without permission. Because of that, the Government suspended the construction by decree on July 17, 1896. Works were finally resumed on September 14, giving also new concessions to the company.

When the line from the city of Corrientes to San Luis del Palmar was finished in 1898, the railway was officially inaugurated. It had a total length of 625 kilometres (388 mi). The railway had 3 steam locomotives, two German Kraus and one Tubize made in Belgium.

When the Bolla's company went into bankruptcy, the railway ceased operations in 1904. Concession was cancelled and the Government ordered railway tracks to be removed. Only the San Cosme-Paso de la Patria and the branch to Puerto Italia sections were removed. The line from Primer Correntino mill to San Cosme continued running as a freight transport until 1969 when it was definitely closed.

=== Dodero's administration ===
On September 23, 1908, a new law was promulgated. It granted concession to shipping entrepreneur Carlos Dodero. In 1909 works began to extend the line to Nuestra Señora del Rosario de Caá Catí, where General Paz station was built. After the acquisition of rolling stock and properties, the line was opened in 1912.

Rail tracks from Primer Correntino mill to Corrientes station had been lifted so it had to be rebuilt. Another 178-km branch was constructed from Lomas de Vallejos to Mburucuyá. Italian engineer Mauro Herlitzka was in charge of works.

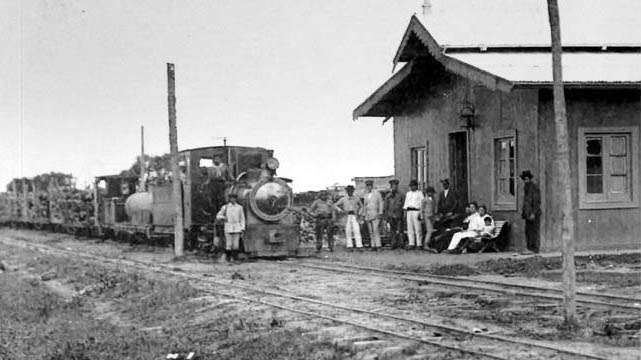
Unidentified station with a freight train stopped at it (1914).

One of the locomotives acquired by Dodero was an Orenstein & Koppel 0-6-0 built in Germany. That locomotive is currently serving at Tren del Fin del Mundo in Ushuaia, where it came in 1993. Other similar machines are exhibited at Concordia and Paraná stations, as well as in the Scalabrini Ortiz Railway Museum of Retiro, Buenos Aires.

=== Final years ===
After the Dodero's administration failure, the railway was taken over by Banco Francés del Río de la Plata and then by the Provincial Government in 1927 until the line was Nationalised during Juan Perón's administration in 1948, becoming part of General Urquiza Railway. The lack of maintenance and the floods that deteriorated the line resulted in the definitive closure by the Government in 1969. Soon after the entire line was dismantled.

In 2009, there were some attempts to reactivate the railway, running trains from Santa Ana de los Guácaras and the Primer Correntino mill, although it was never carried out.

== See also ==
- Urquiza Railway
- Rail transport in Argentina
