= Battle of Villamontes =

- Part of the Chaco War
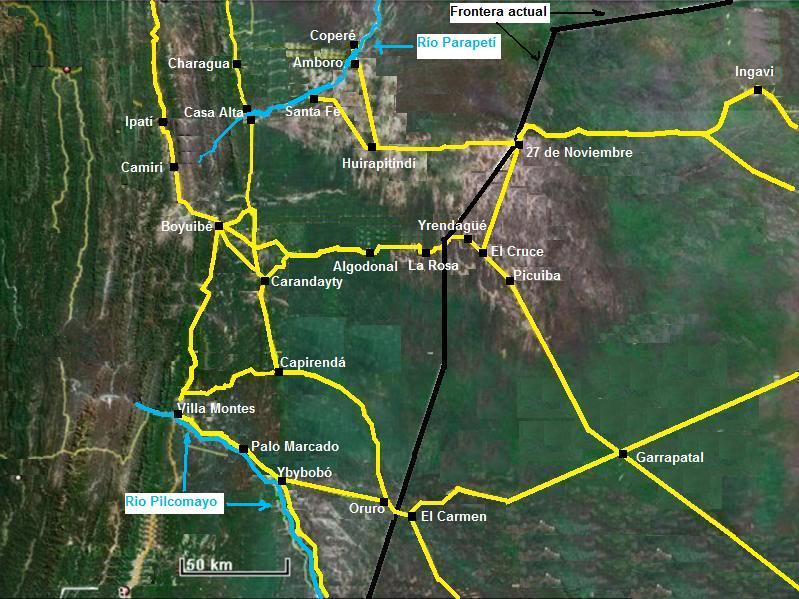
- Map of the northwestern end of the Chaco, where the battle took place.
Date	7 February - 12 June 1935
Location	Villamontes, Bolivia
Result	Bolivian victory

Belligerents
Bolivia	Paraguay

Commanders and leaders
Enrique Peñaranda; Bernardino Bilbao Rioja	José Félix Estigarribia; Carlos Fernández

Strength
10000-17000 men	5000 men

Casualties and losses
Unknown	4500 casualties

The Battle of Villamontes was a series of engagements centered around the Bolivian city of Villamontes between forces of that country and those of Paraguay, starting in February 1935, during the Chaco War. After a great Paraguayan offensive effort marked by victories at the Battles of El Carmen and Yrendagüé, they would finally be stalled in the foothills of the Andes by the Bolivian Army, forestalled by the Bolivian fortifications at Villamontes, after some unfruitful attempts to take them by storm.

== Background ==
In December 1934, Paraguayan forces encircled and made surrender the center of the Bolivian line at the Battle of El Carmen; then, weeks after, at the Battle of Yrendagüé, the Bolivian right wing was broken, and the Paraguayan 2nd Corps embarked on a pursuit of its remnants, though delayed by the lack of trucks and fuel, heavy rains and the lack of roads.

The new Bolivian line, after those defeats, was centered on three points: Capirendá, 50 km to the northeast of Villamontes, at the foothills of the Chaco; Ybibobó, to its southeast, and Carandaitý, to its north. On 28 December 1934, Ybibobó was attacked and captured the Paraguayan 3rd Corps; the 9th Division, one of two divisions defending it, was destroyed against the Pilcomayo River. On the first days of January 1935, Capirendá was taken by the Paraguayan 1st Corps, and its defender, the Bolivian 3rd Division, made to withdraw, with one of its regiments surrounded and destroyed. Carandaitý, defended by the Bolivian 7th Division which had withdrawn relatively intact from Yrendagüé, and the 1st Cavalry Division, which had suffered heavy losses in the same effort, was mostly withdrawn from by January 23, when it was taken by the Paraguayan 2nd Corps after a wide encircling maneuver.

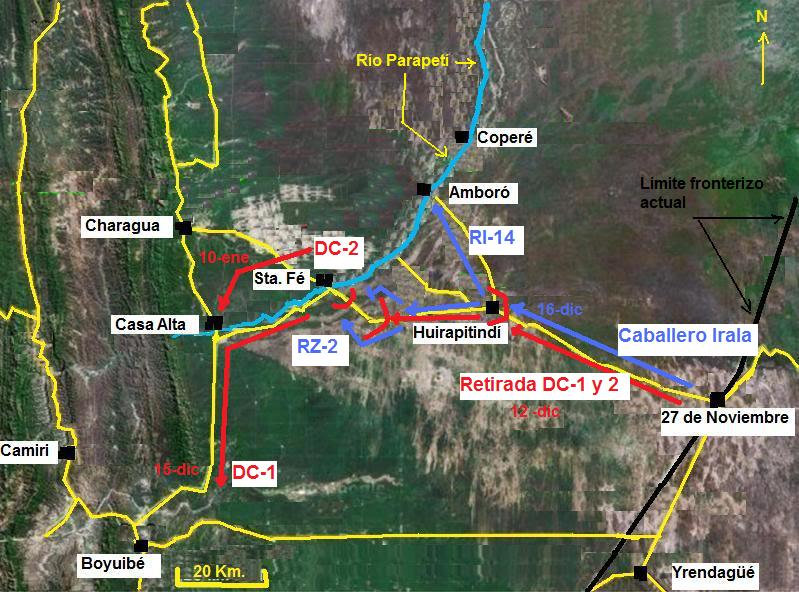
Movement by the Caballero Irala detachment between December 1934 and 18 January 1935. Red = Bolivian forces. Blue = Paraguayan forces.

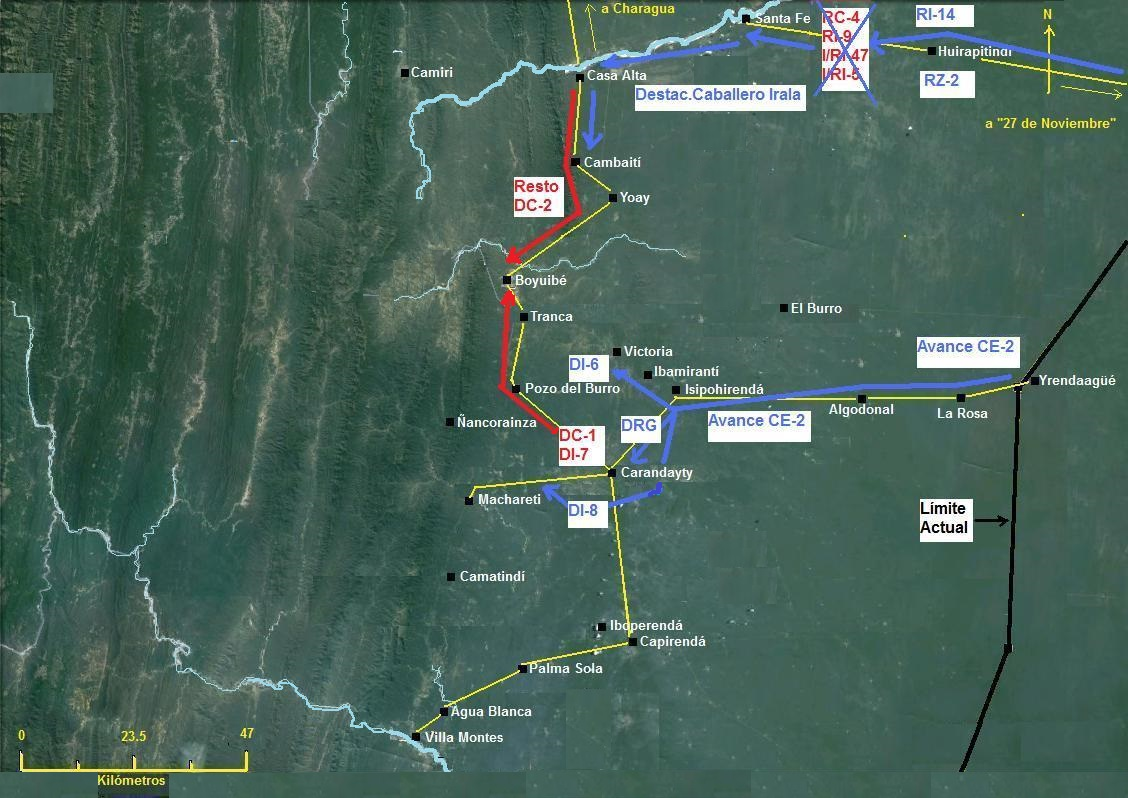
Movement by the Paraguayan 2nd Corps and the supporting detachment in January 1935. Red = Bolivian forces. Blue = Paraguayan forces.

Low-level engagements and wide pressure were maintained by Paraguayan forces on the retreating Bolivians until February, when the first battles were fought in the foothills of the Andes. These first few engagements were revealing to Paraguayan command as to the challenges of operating in the hilly zone. Namely, it was much harder to surprise the enemy in the fashion that had been used in the Chaco, as the abundant high ground made observation of enemy armies easy; it was also much harder to progress without proper maps, and Paraguay lacked these. Still, by February 1935, Villamontes, the main pass towards the Bolivian highlands, and central supply hub to their army, was partly encircled. Capturing it would allow for an invasion of the Tarija Department.

Villamontes had been heavily fortified by Bolivian command the months prior. With fortifications that were the "most complex and solid ever built for this war", stretching over 43 km and comprising a maze of trenches and bunkers, boasting 1,200 machine guns, 83 artillery pieces and 43 mortars.

== Engagement ==
The Paraguayan 1st and 3rd Corps, 5,000 men strong, attacked Villamontes on 7 February. Against it, were arrayed more than 10,000 Bolivian troops, with air support and artillery; the Paraguayans lacked shells for their guns.

The attack progressed slowly until on 16 February a salient was created on the Bolivian left, but it was partly forced back with overwhelming firepower. Four days later, repeated frontal assaults by the Paraguayan troops produced no gains and resulted in heavy losses. Without artillery, the Bolivian fortifications would be unassailable. The front stalled, and offensive operations were taken up in other sectors of the front, with many of the Paraguayan troops in the sector being sent to other theaters. This proved to be advantageous for them, as this tied up much of the Bolivian Army in a single point of the front, diminishing the weight of their numerical advantage.

On 16 March, the Bolivian forces attacked, attempting to destroy the bulge captured by the Paraguayans on 16 February. Two days later, they had accomplished that goal, but suffered heavy losses, specially from friendly fire; they had 500 casualties to the Paraguayans' 80. Trench warfare resumed, and thousands of the demoralized Bolivians deserted over the following weeks.

In 14 April, a Bolivian offensive was directed against the Paraguayan right flank in Villamontes, and broke through one of their supply roads, but failed to encircle them, as had been the goal. On 19 April, the nearby town of Tarairí was retaken by the Bolivians, forcing the Paraguayan 1st Corps to retreat along the front. Still, this came at the cost of heavy casualties for the Bolivians, as the terrain made attacks difficult for both sides. Lines remained thus until peace was declared on June 12, as Bolivian attacks on other sectors of the front made further plans to attack at Villa Montes, to be aided by cannon taken from their gunboats, impossible.
