= Humaitá-class gunboat =

1931 class of Paraguayan Navy gunboat

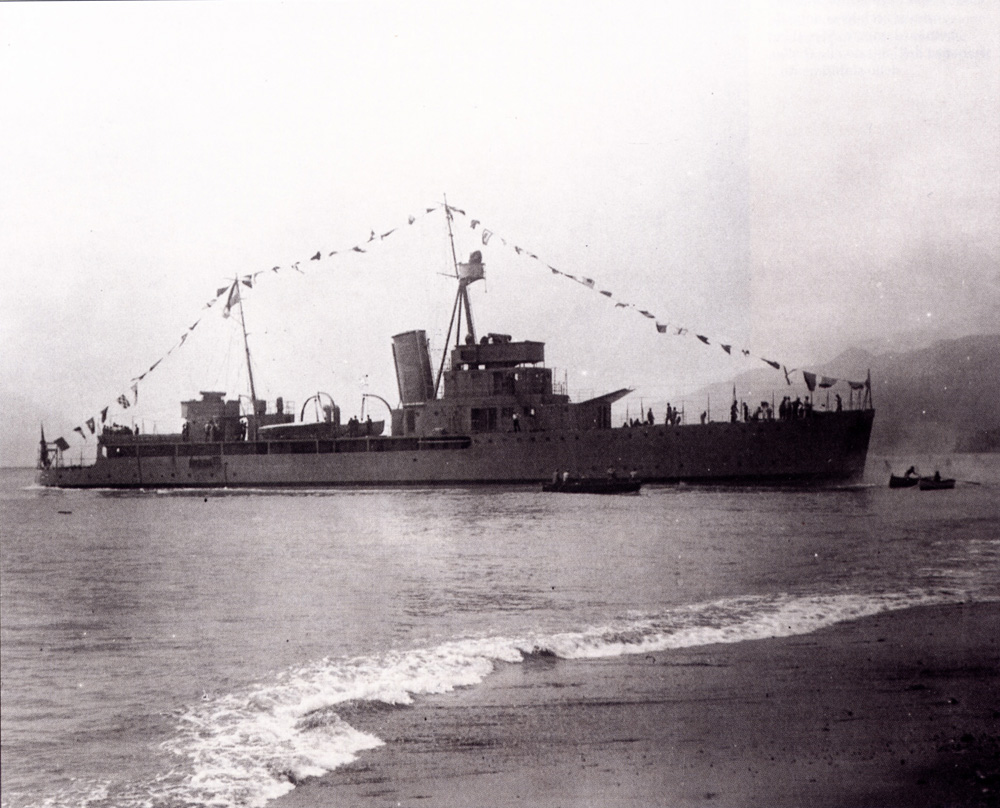
- ARP Humaitá shortly after being launched in Italy (1931)

Class overview
- Name: Humaitá class
- Builders: Cantieri Odero, Genoa
- Operators: Paraguayan Navy
- Cost: £300,000 total
- In commission: 1931–1992
- Planned: 2
- Completed: 2
- Preserved: 2

General characteristics
- Type: Gunboat
- Displacement: 856 tn
- Length: 70 m (229.7 ft)
- Beam: 10.7 m (35.1 ft)
- Draught: 1.7 m (5.6 ft)
- Propulsion: 2 Parsons geared steam turbines; 2 shafts; 3,800 shp (2,800 kW)
- Speed: 18 knots (21 mph; 33 km/h)
- Range: 1,700 nmi (3,100 km) at 16 kn (30 km/h)
- Complement: 86
- Armament: 4 × 4.7-inch (119 mm); 3 × 3-inch (76 mm); 2 × 40-millimetre (2 in) autocannon; 6 mines
- Armour: Belt: 0.5 in (13 mm); Deck: 0.3 in (8 mm); Turrets: 0.3 in (8 mm); Conning tower: 0.76 in (19 mm)

The Humaitá-class gunboat is a two-unit class of riverine gunboats designed by Paraguayan naval engineer José Bozzano and built in Genoa, Italy, for the Paraguayan Navy from 1928 to 1931. The warships played a key role as fast armed transports during the Chaco War with Bolivia.

== Design ==
The Humaitá class was designed to meet the Paraguayan goal of achieving naval supremacy in the Paraguay River, given the conflict with Bolivia over the Chaco region. The original plan had not was part of Bozzano's thesis at the Massachusetts Institute of Technology. The gunboats had a larger freeboard than other fresh-water designs of the time. The forecastle was also longer than usual riverine units. The twin 4.7-inch (119 mm) guns and the 76 mm (3 in) cannons made their gunnery heavier than some seagoing destroyer classes, like the Italian Freccia and Turbine, or the British flotilla leaders. A British officer stated that the Paraguayan ships were the most powerful riverine vessels in the world. The range and the strength of the design foresaw the need of troop transports in the incoming war. Bozzano was asked to build vessels capable of carrying a 1,400 men-strong regiment each.

=== Armament ===
The main battery consisted of two twin Ansaldo 4.7 in (120 mm) guns. The secondary armament was made of three Ansaldo anti-aircraft 76 mm (3 in) cannons, one for each band and a third on the foredeck. Originally the vessels mounted two Vickers 40 mm autocannons and cranes and racks for lying mines, of which each gunboat carried six.

=== Armour ===
The engines, main guns and bridge were protected by a light armour shield. The armoured belt was 0.5 in (13 mm) thick, the turrets and deck armour had a thickness of 0.3 in (8 mm) and the bridge's armoured plate 0.75 in (19 mm).

=== Propulsion ===
The propulsion system consisted of two boilers connected to two Parsons geared turbines. The turbines produced 3.800 hp for a speed of 18 knots (21 mph; 33 km/h).

== Ships in class ==
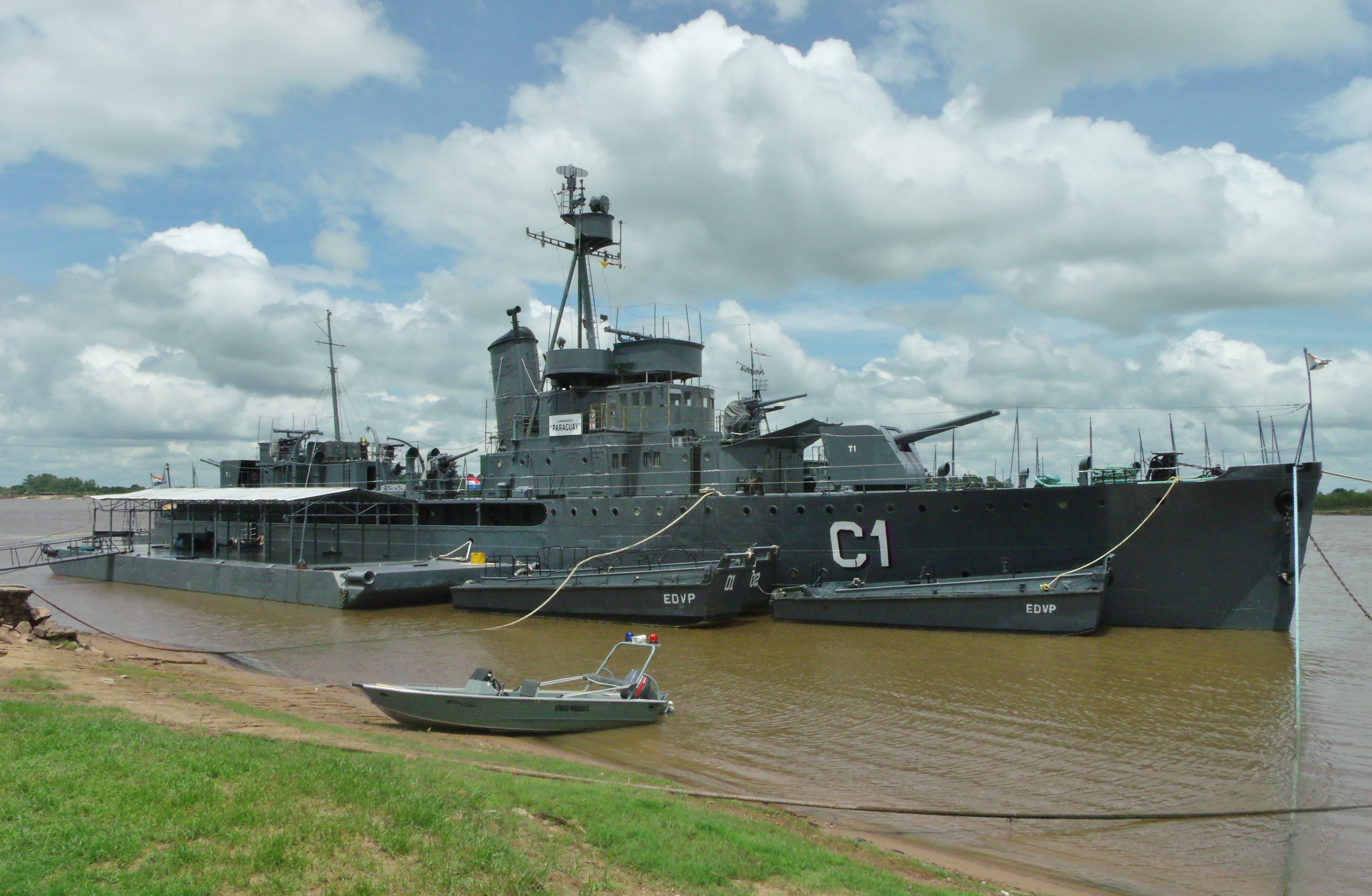
ARP Paraguay

| Name | Namesake | Builder | Laid down | Launched | Commissioned | Fate |
|---|---|---|---|---|---|---|
| ARP Paraguay | Paraguay | Cantieri Odero, Genoa | 1929 | 1930 | May 1931 | Awaiting refurbish |
| ARP Humaitá | Siege of Humaitá | Cantieri Odero, Genoa | 1929 | 1930 | May 1931 | Museum ship in 1992 |

== Operational history ==
The two ships of the class, ARP Humaitá (C2) and ARP Paraguay (C1), departed from Genoa on 19 April 1931, manned by Bozzano, a handful of Paraguayan officers and an Italian crew. They entered the Atlantic after paying an unintended official visit to Gibraltar, where they were received by the battlecruiser HMS Renown, and sailed for Buenos Aires, Argentina, via Pernambuco in Brazil. In Buenos Aires the Italian personnel was replaced by a Paraguayan crew. The gunboats reached Asunción on 5 May 1931. The arrival of the vessels prompted yet another diplomatic protest from Bolivia, whose bilateral relations with Paraguay had been increasingly deteriorating due to the dispute over the Chaco region since 1928.

The first operational mission of Humaitá was the deployment of a detachment of reservists to Puerto Casado, some 200 km (120 mi) from the frontline, in July 1932, barely a month after the beginning of the Chaco War with Bolivia. Along with their role of fast transport of soldiers and resupplies, the gunboats provided air defense to the shipping on the Paraguay River. The first engagement against Bolivian aircraft took place near Puerto Leda on 22 December 1932, when two Vickers Vespas dropped a bomb and strafed Humaitá, only to be driven off. Paraguayan sources claimed one aircraft damaged. The Vespas had attacked and damaged the Paraguayan gunboat ARP Tacuary at Bahía Negra just minutes before. Humaitá was hit by several machine-gun rounds from one of the planes, but her armour shield prevented any damage.

According to the Paraguayan Navy files, Humaitá ferried 62,546 troops upriver for a total of 84 trips. Paraguay carried 51,867 soldiers to the frontlines in 81 trips. The Bolivian army gave up any hope of a naval presence in the Paraguay River when they learned of the firepower of the gunboats, although they deployed the 50-ton armed launch Tahuamanu on the river for a brief time.

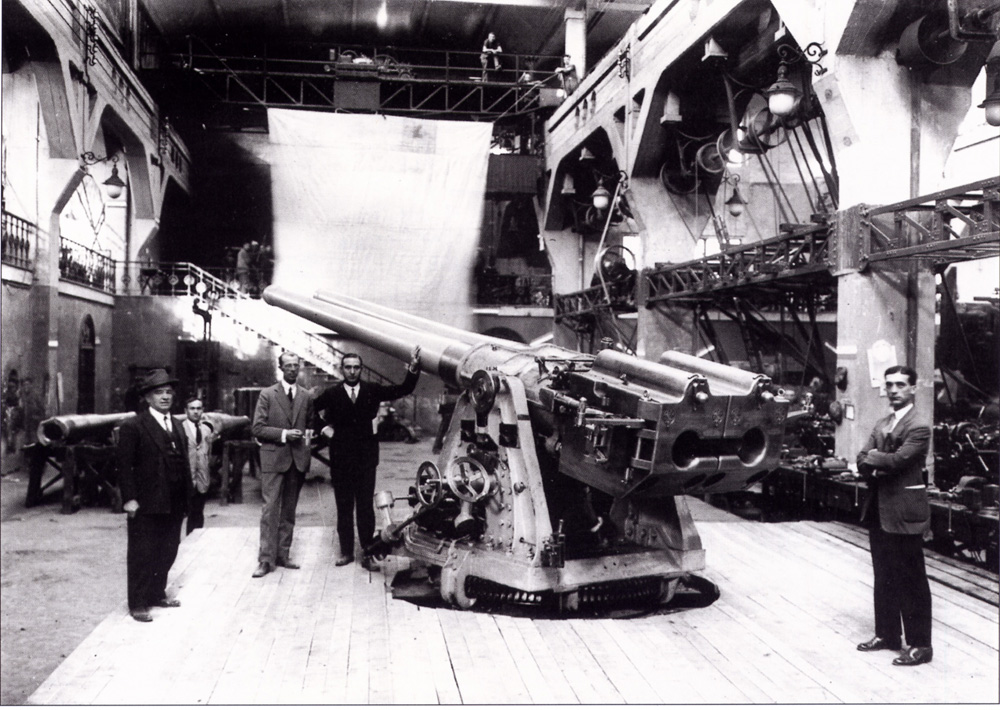
4.7 in Ansaldo twin guns

In the last months of the war, as the Paraguayan offensives around Villa Montes dragged on, the Paraguayan High Command consulted the navy about the feasibility of dismounting Humaitá's main guns and moving them in an 800 km (500 mi) inland trip to the trenches. A special tracked vehicle was adapted from a tractor to tow the ship's turrets through the forest. The Commander-in-Chief of the army, General Estigarribia, hoped that the rate of fire and range of the 4.7 in twin guns would pound the defenses of Villa Montes to pieces from 22 km (14 mi) away, but the war was over before the plan could come together.

During the 1947 Paraguayan Civil War, the crews of Humaitá and Paraguay, at the time undergoing a major overhaul in Buenos Aires, took control of the vessels and arrested the officers loyal to president Higinio Morínigo. They sailed up to Carmelo, in Uruguay. The vessels had to be armed with machine guns instead of antiaircraft cannons, because the older ones had been dismounted to be replaced in Argentina. The crew also picked up a cache of 250 rifles. The rebel ships then steamed up the Paraná River, and near Paso de la Patria, Argentina, the government T-6 Texans aircraft unleashed a series of airstrikes on the rebel flotilla, disabling Humaitá, which was hit by a 210-pound (95 kg) bomb that destroyed the central gunfire director and became stranded off Ituzaingó. Rebel personnel from Paraguay landed on the islands of Corateí and San Pablo, but they were eventually isolated and captured on 25 July by loyal troops carried by the transport ships Tirador and Capitán Cabral. Humaitá was afloat again by 13 August, when she and her sister ship tried to enter the Paraguay River. Both ships were shelled by a loyal coastal battery and had to withdraw to Itá Ibaté in Argentina. The gunboats were interned by Argentine authorities, and eventually handed over to the Paraguayan government in August, when the rebellion was finally crushed. In 1955, Paraguay became involved in the aftermath of Argentina's Revolucion Libertadora, when former president Juan Domingo Perón went into exile aboard the Paraguayan vessel.

The last military mission of the gunboats took place on the first hours of 3 February 1989, during the fall of president Alfredo Stroessner, when Humaitá along with the patrol boats Capitán Cabral and Itaipú, joined the rebel forces and shelled government and military facilities loyal to Stroessner. The shelling was decisive for the success of the coup against the Stroessner dictatorship.

The gunboats were upgraded in 1975. Humaitá was made into a museum ship in 1992, at anchor in Asunción's bay while Paraguay was still used as storage ship, pending the replacement of her steam propulsion with diesel engines.

On 24 December 2022, Humaitá began to take water at her moorings and listed port side. She was refloated by divers and technicians of the Paraguayan Navy by 28 December.
