= Itá Ibaté =

- Town
- Location of Itá Ibaté in Argentina
- Coordinates: 27°55′33″S 57°20′17″W
- Country: Argentina
- Province: Corrientes
- Department: General Paz
- Elevation: 59 m (194 ft)

Population
  - Total: 4,115
- Demonym: itaibateño/a
- Time zone: UTC−3 (ART)
- CPA base: W3480
- Dialing code: +54 3781

Itá Ibaté (in Guarani high stone) is a town in Corrientes Province, Argentina. It is located in the General Paz Department.

The town was founded in 1877.
