= Mburucuyá, Corrientes =

Mburucuyá Mburukuja
- Town
- Location of Mburucuyá in Argentina
- Coordinates: 28°03′S 58°14′W
- Country: Argentina
- Province: Corrientes
- Department: Mburucuyá
- Elevation: 70 m (230 ft)

Population
  - Total: 9,012
- Demonym: mburucuyano/a
- Time zone: UTC−3 (ART)
- CPA base: W3427
- Dialing code: +54 3782

Mburucuyá (Guarani: Mburukuja) is a town in Corrientes Province, Argentina. It is the capital of Mburucuyá Department.

From 1912 until 1927 Mburucuyá had a railway station on the Ferrocarril Económico Correntino narrow gauge railway from Corrientes.

== Fiesta del Chamamé ==
In the 2nd week of February the town hosts the "Festival Nacional de Chamamé tradicional" which is a celebration of the Chamamé folk genre.

== See also ==
- Mburucuyá National Park
