= Paraguayan Navy =

National military force

- Armada Paraguaya
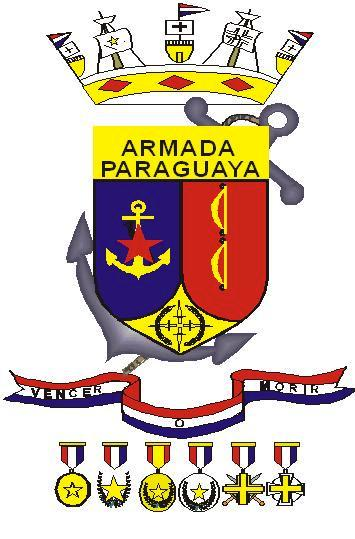
- Founded: Officially since 1811
- Country: Paraguay
- Type: Navy
- Size: 5400 personnel
- Part of: Armed Forces of Paraguay
- Mottos: Vencer o Morir (To win or to die)
- March: Marcha al Mariscal Lopez
- Anniversaries: 12th of September
- Engagements: War of the Triple Alliance; Chaco War

Commanders
- Commander of the Paraguayan Navy: Vice-Admiral Lucio Benitez Escalante

Insignia
- Naval Jack

The Paraguayan Navy (Spanish: Armada Paraguaya) is the maritime force of the Armed Forces of Paraguay, in charge of the defense of Paraguay's waterways. It has gone to war on two occasions: the War of the Triple Alliance (1864–1870) against Brazil, Argentina, and Uruguay, and the Chaco War (1932–1935) against Bolivia. Although Paraguay is a landlocked country, it maintains a strong naval tradition due to its connections to the Atlantic Ocean through the Paraguay–Paraná rivers. The Paraguayan Navy has twelve bases, with its main base in Puerto Sajonia in Asunción, followed by Bahia Negra, Ciudad del Este, Encarnacion, Salto del Guaira. It also has aviation facilities in Puerto Sajonia.

The Navy has 34 surface ships, some of which have reached centenarian age, due in part to limited use and the vessels floating in fresh water. The flagship of the Paraguay Navy is the Humaita, which was commissioned prior to Paraguay's involvement in the Chaco War. The vast majority of the fleet are patrol ships and auxiliary vessels. The rest of the fleet is composed of tugboats, barges, landing craft, transports, and a presidential yacht. The new additions are four Croc-class riverine vessels from Australia, plus 43 locally built riverline patrol vessels constructed from 2006 to 2009. For air support, one Helibras HB350 helicopter is used to provide SAR, MEDEVAC and utility work

== Role ==
Its main mission is to contribute to the defense of Paraguay, in order to protect and guarantee sovereignty over its water resources.

These priorities include:

- The custody and defense of the coasts, ports and areas of fluvial interest in its area of influence.
- Logistics support base for future operations of the forces.
- Exercise prefectural functions in its area of influence.
- Cooperate with the tasks of civil defense in cases of natural disasters, environmental protection and the restoration of internal order.

== Fleet ==
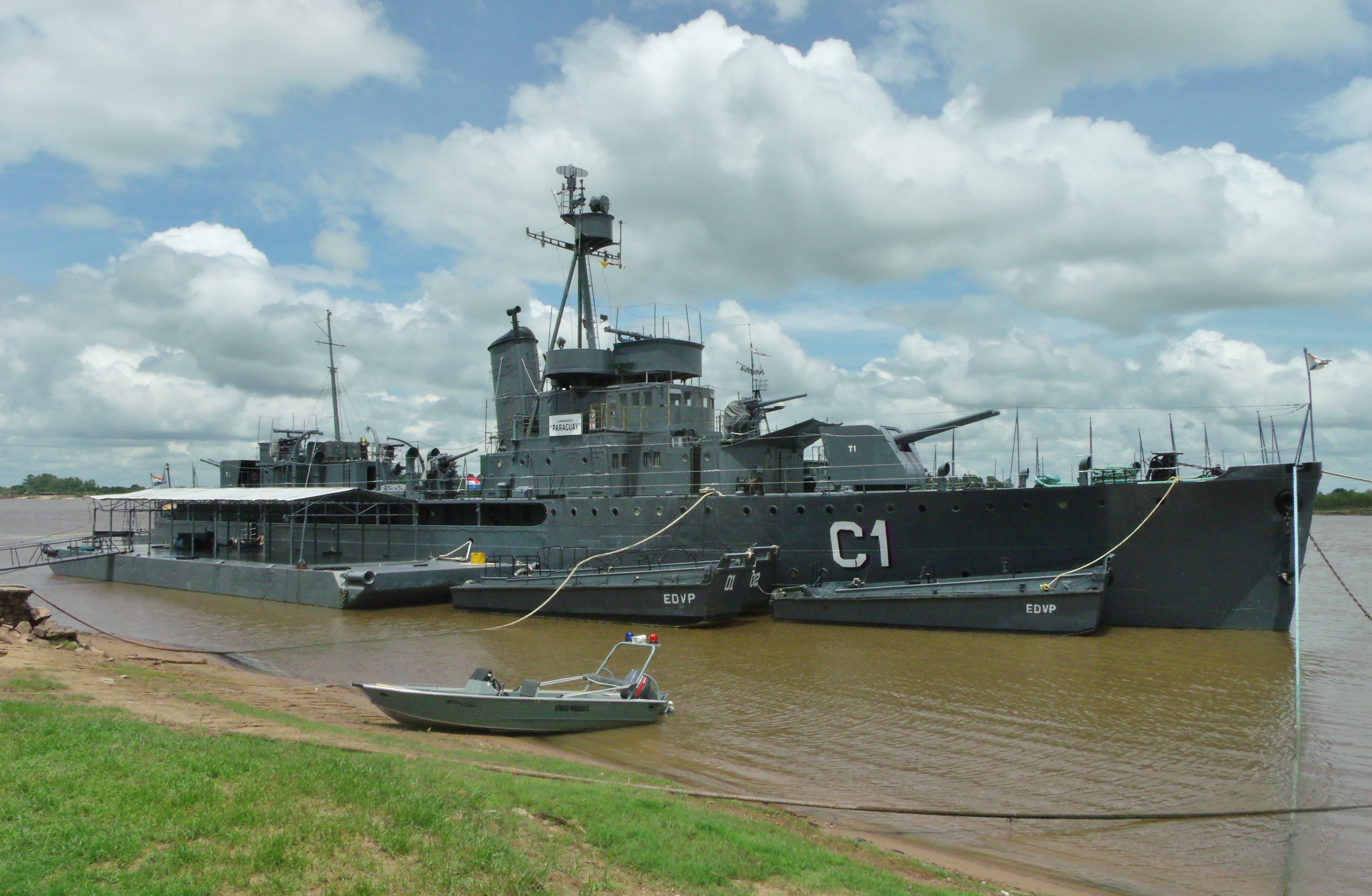
Flagship, river gunboat ARP Paraguay

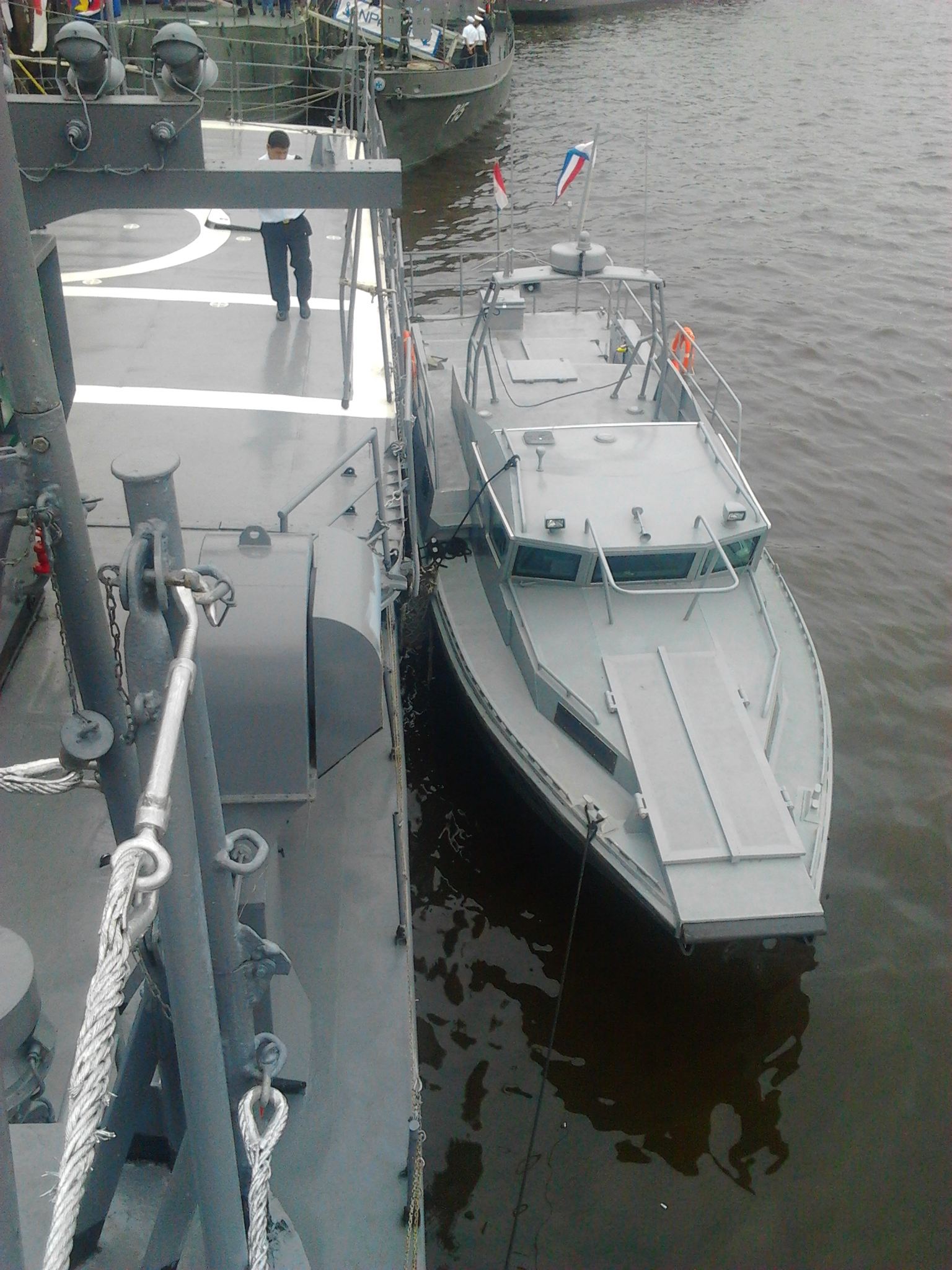
CROQ15 alongside Itaipú

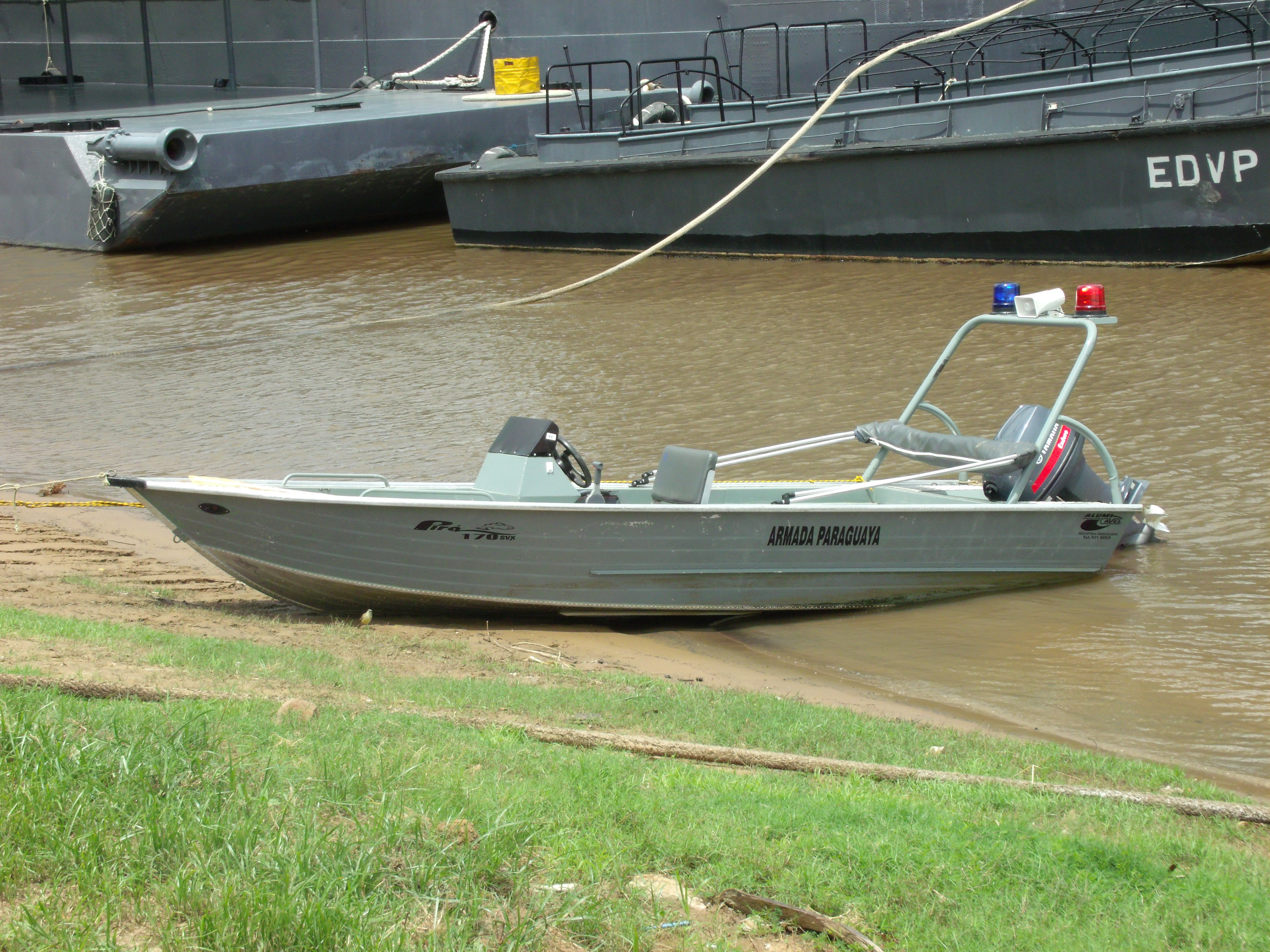
Pirá 170 SVX patrol class

=== Gunboats ===
- Paraguay (C1) (built 1930)
- Humaitá (C2) (still commissioned, but now designated as a museum ship; also built 1930)

=== River patrol ships ===
- Capitán Cabral (P01)
- Itaipú (P05)

=== Patrol vessels ===
- Capitán Ortiz (P06)
- Teniente Robles (P07)
- Yhaguy (P08)
- Tebicuary (P09)
- 5 x patrol boats LP7-LP11
- 2 x Class 701 patrol boats Class LP101 108
- 2 x Croq-15 class patrol boats P201-202
- 43 x Light patrol boats, all constructed in Paraguay between 2006 and 2009
- Pirá 500 SL 5 × 1.60 m. Yamaha 25 hp.
- Pirá 170 SVX 5.20 × 1.60 m. Yamaha 40 hp.
- Pirá 240 SVX 6.50 × 2,40 m. Yamaha 90 hp.
- Pirá 4.80 × 1.80 m. Yamaha 50 hp.

=== Tugboats ===
- Triunfo R4 (1960), constructed in USA
- Angostura R5 (1960) constructed in USA
- Stella Maris R6 (1970)
- Esperanza R7 (1970)

=== Other ===
- Amphibious assault craft LCVP 3 (1980), constructed in Brazil
- 1 x Floating dock: DF-1 (1944), constructed in USA
- 1 x Training ship: Guaraní (1968), constructed in Spain
- 1 x Presidential yacht: 3 de Febrero (1972)
- 1 x Casualty ship - T1 (1964)

== Naval aviation ==
Aircraft	Origin	Type	Version	In service
Helicopters
Helibras HB350 Esquilo	Brazil	Transport and light attack helicopter	HB350B	1
Training aircraft
Cessna 150	United States	Training aircraft	150M	2
Utility aircraft
Cessna 210	United States	Reconnaissance aircraft	210	1
Cessna 310	United States	Reconnaissance aircraft	310	2
Cessna 401	United States	Transport aircraft	401	1

== Ranks ==
=== Commissioned officer ranks ===
The rank insignia of commissioned officers.

Rank group	General / flag officers			Senior officers			Junior officers
Paraguayan Navy
Paraguayan Navy	Almirante	Vicealmirante	Contraalmirante	Capitán de navío	Capitán de fragata	Capitán de corbeta	Teniente de navio	Teniente de fragata	Teniente de corbeta	Guardiamarina

=== Other ranks ===
The rank insignia of non-commissioned officers and enlisted personnel.

Rank group	Senior NCOs					Junior NCOs		Enlisted
Paraguayan Navy								No insignia
Paraguayan Navy	Sub-oficial principal	Sub-oficial mayor	Sub-oficial de primera	Sub-oficial de segunda	Maestre	Cabo primero	Cabo segundo	Dragoneante

== See also ==
- Paraguayan Air Force
- Paraguayan Army
