= Paraguayan Army =

National military force

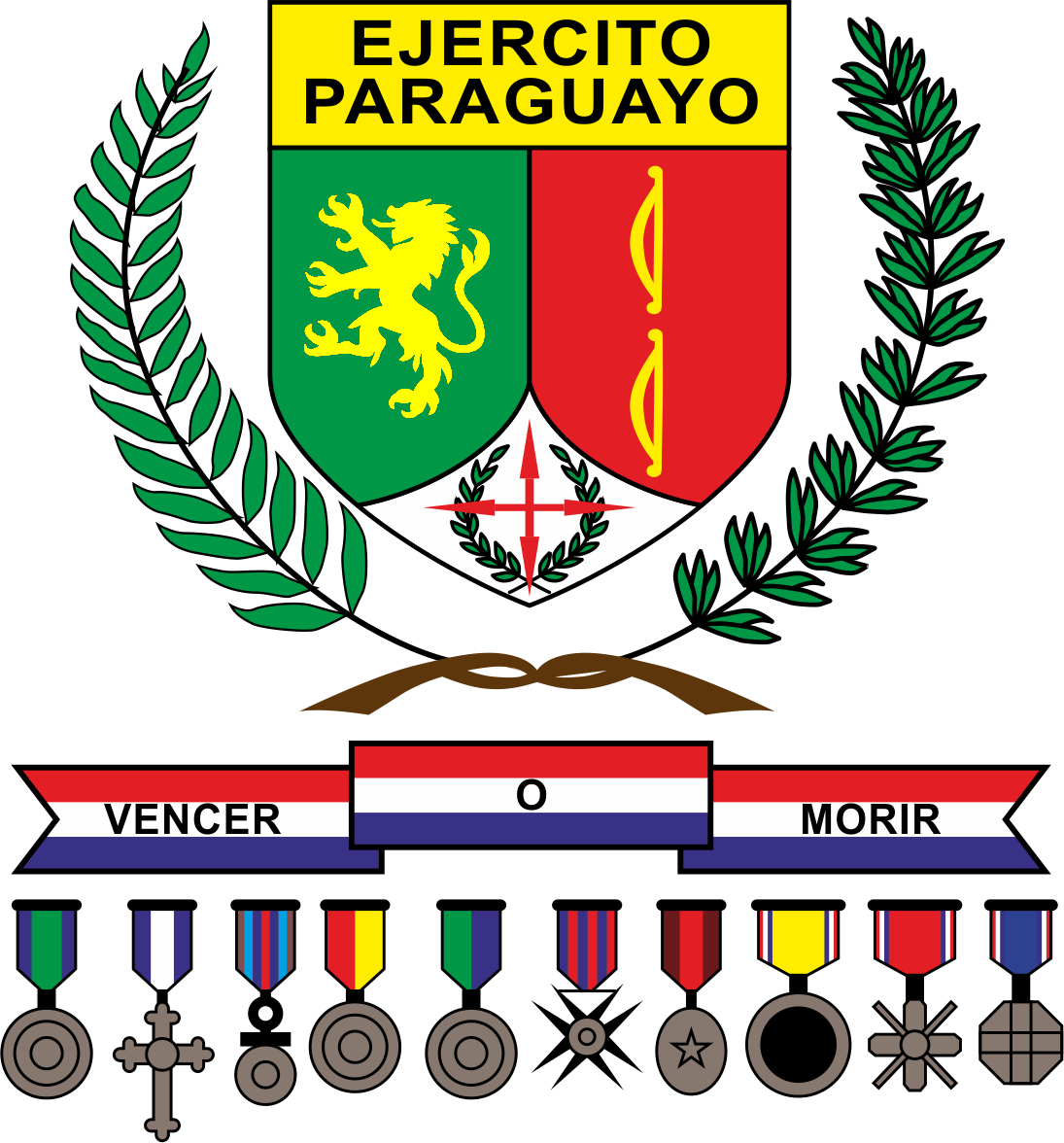
- Paraguayan Army Seal
- Founded: Officially since 1811
- Country: Paraguay
- Type: Army
- Size: 20,000 active personnel 160,000 reserves
- Part of: Armed Forces of Paraguay
- Mottos: Spanish: Vencer o Morir; To win or to die
- March: Marcha al Mariscal Lopez
- Anniversaries: 24 of July (Mariscal Lopez Birthday)
- Engagements: Platine War; War of the Triple Alliance; Paraguayan Civil War (1911–1912); Paraguayan Civil War (1922–1923); Chaco War; Paraguayan Civil War (1947); 1954 Paraguayan coup d'état 1989 Paraguayan coup d'état Paraguayan People's Army insurgency

Commanders
- Chief of the Paraguayan Army: General Darío Martin Cáceres Snead
- Notable commanders: José Félix Estigarribia; Francisco Solano López

The Paraguayan Army (Spanish: Ejército Paraguayo) is the ground force branch of the Armed Forces of Paraguay. It is organized into three corps and nine divisions, and several commands and direction. It has gone to war on many occasions, notably in the War of the Triple Alliance (1864–1870) against Brazil, Argentina and Uruguay; the Chaco War against Bolivia; and the ongoing Paraguayan People's Army insurgency.

== Mission ==
- Maintaining the sanctity of the land borders of the Republic of Paraguay.
- To strengthen civil-military relations.
- Cooperate in emergency rescue and relief operations during disasters.
- Organize, compose and manage reservations.
- To organize, equip and train strength to face any domestic or international threat/
- Cooperate in activities to support the country's national development.
- To cooperate with scientific and technological development of the country.

== History ==
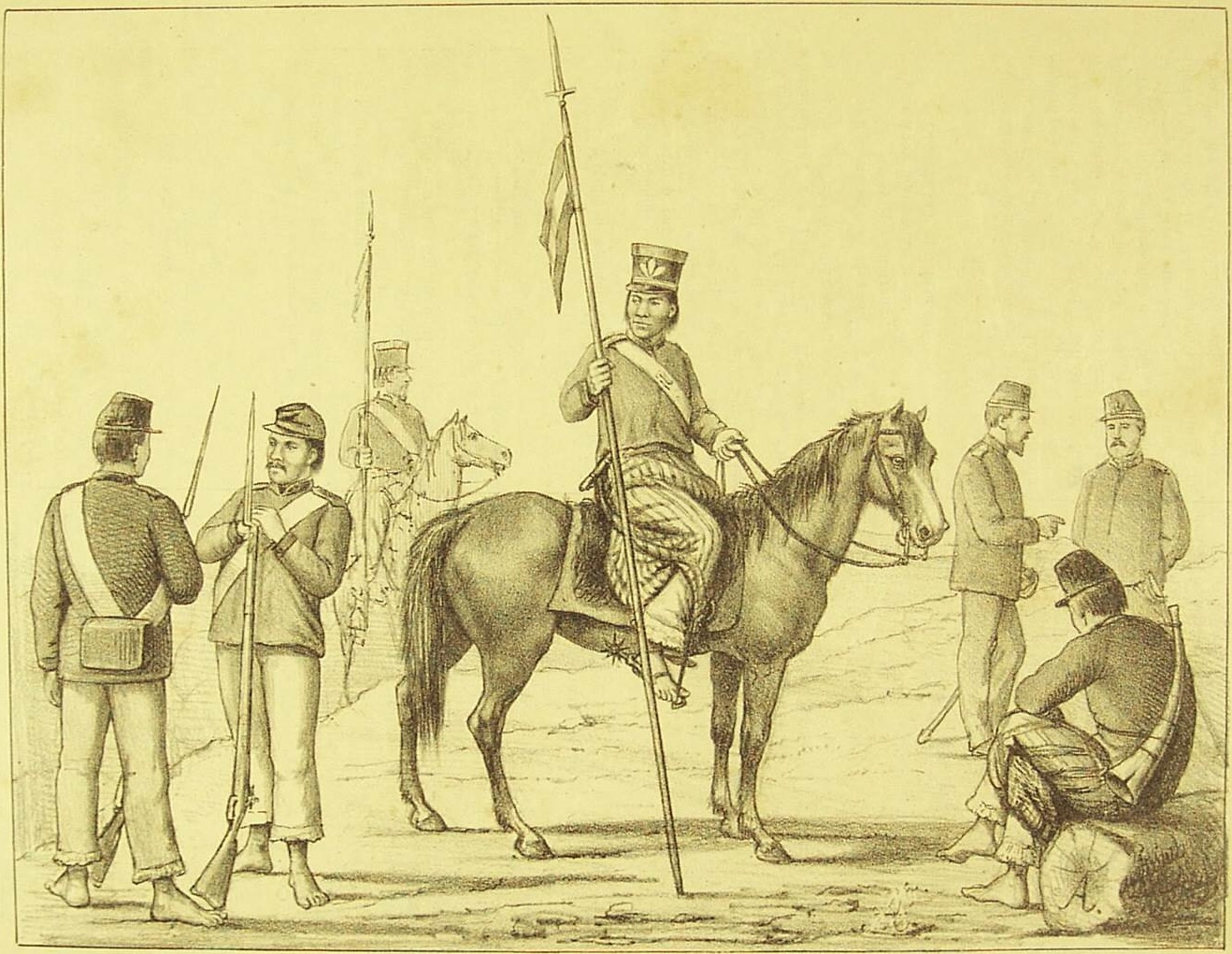
Uniforms of cavalry and infantry of the Paraguayan army at the time of the War of the Triple Alliance.

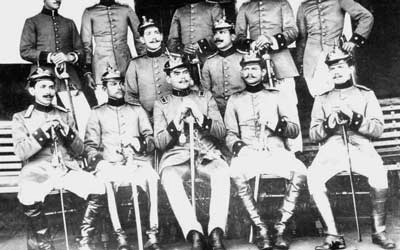
Officers and NCOs of the Paraguayan Army wearing variants of the Pickelhaube helmet in the early 1910s.

Paraguay's army was formally established in 1811, the year of the country's independence. For the first several years of Paraguay's existence the commanders of the army, such as Fulgencio Yegros and Pedro Juan Caballero, formed the majority of the cabinet until 1814, when they were replaced by Dr. José Gaspar Rodríguez de Francia, who installed himself as supreme dictator for life after a series of political clashes with Yegros. Francia removed all army personnel from the government and reformed the army, which was by now inept and corrupt. He limited the power of the army by declaring that no rank above captain could be achieved, and that after three years of service officers were to be retired. By 1816 there were no officers in the army who had fought at the Tacuarí or the Paraguarí. Francia's horse-grenadier guard company was the first new unit created and was to form the nucleus of the army. Each captain was given command of a branch of the service, which consisted of line infantry, light infantry, dragoons, chasseurs, hussars and artillery. The infantry, artillery and hussars were stationed in the capital Asunción, and the rest of the army was stationed in outposts around the country to defend from attacks by Indians. The cavalry would go dismounted during peacetime, and were distinguished by the yellow aiguillette sewn onto their left shoulder. Although no formal wars were fought, conflicts with the Chaco Indians, particularly the sub-groups of the Guaykuru tribes, raged in the borderlands. The size of the army varied according to the magnitude of threat. In 1825 it was 5,000 strong, but in 1834 it was only 649 strong. There was also a large number of militia troops, which usually numbered around 25,000.

After Francia's death in 1840, Carlos Antonio López assumed power and modernized the army and expanded the navy. He opened an iron foundry at Ybycuí that produced arms and bullets and also built up a railway system in the country to transport troops and materiel.

Following the succession of Lopez's son, Francisco Solano López, the army was expanded yet further until it was one of the largest in South America, consisting by 1864 of 44 infantry battalions, 46 cavalry regiments and four artillery regiments. In that same year Paraguay fought its first actual war against Brazil, Uruguay and Argentina. Despite Paraguayan numerical superiority and initial success, the allies soon upped their game and Paraguay eventually found itself surrounded. Despite constant defeat on the field by the allies, the Paraguayans did not capitulate until Lopez had been killed in 1870, in the Battle of Cerro Corá, having been on the run with his 200 remaining men.

== Presence in UN Missions ==
- Haiti (MINUSTAH)
- Cyprus (UNIFICYP) (a section-size group attached to the Argentinean Battalion)
- Democratic Republic of the Congo (MONUC)
- Chad Central African Republic (MINURCAT)
- Ivory Coast (ONUCI)

== Structure ==
As of 2016, the Paraguayan Army had a total strength of 10,600 personnel, including 2,500 conscripts.

The Paraguayan Army is composed of Presidential Guard Regiment, organized into a regimental HQ, two battalions (infantry and military police), an armored squadron and a battery of field artillery (plus the Mounted Ceremonial Squadron "Aca Caraya"). The regimental equipment includes three Argentine modified M4 Sherman tanks, four EE-9 armored cars, four EE-11 armored personnel carriers (APCs), three M9 halftracks mounting 20mm guns and four M-101 105 mm howitzers. Arguably, this "flagship" unit is structurally and physically the strongest of the whole of the Army. The REP is independent from other commands. The EP features two field artillery groups (GAC 1–12 88 mm QF-25 and GAC 2–12 105mm M-101) and one air defense artillery group (GAA 13 40 mm L 40/60, Oerlikon 20 mm cannons, and six M-55 4×12, 7.0 mm).

Six battalions of combat engineers, one communications battalion, one Special Forces battalion, seven regiments of infantry and six regiments of cavalry comprise the rest of the force. There is little organic aviation available to it.

Each corps has a weapons school run by its command. The logistical command manages and addresses materials, mobilization, health care, etc. The command of the Army Institute of Education administers three schools, commissioned and noncommissioned officers, a military academy and the CIMEFOR (a center for pre-military study that trains Reserve officers).

Each of the nine divisions that make up the three corps has one or two regiments of infantry or cavalry, its platoon of engineers, its communications section, military police units, etc.

- Presidential Guard Regiment with its base in Asunción
- 1st Army Corps (Curuguaty)
  - Infantry Division 3
  - Infantry Division 4
  - Cavalry Division 3
- 2nd Army Corps (San Juan Bautista)
  - Infantry Division 1
  - Infantry Division 2
  - Cavalry Division 2
- 3rd Army Corps (Mariscal Estigarribia)
  - Infantry Division 5
  - Infantry Division 6
  - Cavalry Division 1
- Special forces command (Cerrito)
  - One Special Forces battalion and one Special Forces school.
- Army Artillery command (Paraguari)
  - Two artillery groups and one anti-aircraft group, one artillery school.
- The Infantry School and the Infantry Training Battalion.
- Army Command of engineers (Tacumbu)
  - One school and six battalions.
- Army communications command(Tacumbu)
  - One school and one signal battalion.
- Army Training and Doctrine Command
  - Operates the Francisco López Military Academy, three military schools, and a noncommissoned officers school
- Army logistic command (Asunción)
  - The logistic command manages and addresses materials, mobilization, health care, etc.

== Equipment ==
=== Small arms ===
Name	Image	Caliber	Type	Origin	Notes
Pistols
H&K P9S		.45 ACP	Semi-automatic pistol	Germany	
H&K VP70Z		9x19mm	Semi-automatic pistol	Germany	
Browning Hi-Power		9×19mm	Semi-automatic pistol	Belgium	
Submachine guns
H&K UMP9		9×19mm	Submachine gun	Germany	
H&K MP5A3		9×19mm	Submachine gun	Germany	
M3 Grease Gun		9×19mm	Submachine gun	United States	
Uzi		9×19mm	Submachine gun	Israel	
Carl Gustaf m/45		9×19mm	Submachine gun	Sweden	
Madsen M-50		9×19mm	Submachine gun	Denmark	
Rifles
FN FAL		7.62×51mm	Battle rifle	Belgium	In reserve.
Heckler & Koch G3		7.62×51mm	Battle rifle	Germany	In reserve.
SIG SG 540		5.56x45mm	Assault rifle	Switzerland	
AIMS-74		5.45×39mm	Assault rifle	Romania	
T65K2		5.56×45mm	Assault rifle	Republic of China	Standard issue.
Norinco CQ		5.56×45mm	Assault rifle	China	Norinco CQ-5.56mm Type A
Beretta AR70		5.56×45mm	Assault rifle	Italy	
Machine guns
HK21E		7.62×51mm	General-purpose machine gun	Germany	
IWI Negev		5.56×45mm	Light machine gun	Israel	
ZB vz. 26		7.92×57mm	Light machine gun	Czechoslovakia	Upgraded by IMBEL (Brazil)
Browning M2		.50 BMG	Heavy machine gun	United States	
Rocket propelled grenade launchers
M79		40 mm	Grenade launcher	United States	

=== Anti-tank weapons ===
Name	Image	Type	Origin	Caliber	Notes
M72A2 LAW		RPG	United States	66mm	80 in service
M20 Super Bazooka		RPG	United States	88mm	136 in service
M20		Recoilless rifle	United States	105mm	32 in service

=== Vehicles ===
==== Tanks ====
Name	Image	Type	Origin	Quantity	Notes
M3 Stuart		Light tank	United States	10	5 M3 and 5 M3A1

==== Scout cars ====
Name	Image	Type	Origin	Quantity	Notes
M8 Greyhound		Armored car Scout car	United States	12	
EE-9 Cascavel		Armored car Scout car	Brazil	30	Upgraded in Brazil in 2008

==== Armored personnel carriers ====
Name	Image	Type	Origin	Quantity	Notes
M3 half-track		Half-track Armored personnel carrier	United States	20	
EE-11 Urutu		Armored personnel carrier	Brazil	12	

==== Utility vehicles ====
Name	Image	Type	Origin	Quantity	Notes
HMMWV		Light utility vehicle	United States	30	Delivered from Taiwan
M151		Utility vehicle	United States	Unknown	
Land Rover Defender		Utility vehicle	United Kingdom	96	110 and 130
Ford Ranger		Utility vehicle	United States; Argentina	19	
Chevrolet S-10		Utility vehicle	United States; Brazil	104	
Mitsubishi L200		Utility vehicle	Japan; Brazil	19	
Agrale Marruá		Utility vehicle	Brazil	17	
Trucks
M54		Utility truck	United States	Unknown	
Ford Cargo 17-22		Utility truck	United States; Brazil	78	
MAN KAT1		Utility truck	Germany	20	
Amphibious vehicles
ARGO 8×8		Amphibious all-terrain vehicle	Canada	12	

=== Artillery ===
Name	Image	Type	Origin	Quantity	Notes
Mortars
M30 mortar		Mortar	United States	8	
Field artillery
M101		Howitzer	United States	26	
QF-25		Field gun	United Kingdom	12	
Bofors M1934		Mountain gun	Sweden	12	Ceremonial purposes/in reserve
Self-propelled artillery
M108AP		Self-propelled artillery	United States	6	Supplied from Brazil

=== Air defence systems ===
==== Towed anti-aircraft guns ====
Name	Image	Type	Origin	Quantity	Notes
Bofors L/60		Anti-aircraft gun	Sweden	16	

=== Historical equipment ===
==== Sidearms ====
- FN Model 1903
- FN M1900
- Mannlicher M1905
- Smith & Wesson Model 10
- Taurus PT92

==== Rifles ====
- Mauser Model 1889
- Argentine Mauser Model 1909
- FN Model 24
- Lee–Metford
- Mauser Model 1895
- Mauser Model 1904
- Mauser Standardmodell
- M1870 Italian Vetterli
- vz. 24
- vz. 33
- M1 Garand

==== Submachine gun ====
- Erma EMP
- MP 18
- Suomi KP/-31
- M1A1 Thompson

==== Machine guns ====
- Maxim
- Vickers
- Vickers–Berthier
- M1895 Colt-Browning
- M1917 Browning
- M1916 Madsen

==== Tanks ====
- 1 Vickers Mk.E Type A
- 5 M4A3 Sherman
- 3 Sherman Firefly

==== Armored personnel carriers ====
- 23 M2 Half-track

==== Anti-aircraft artillery ====
- QF 1-pounder pom-pom

== Ranks ==
The two most famous military leaders of Independent Paraguay, Francisco Solano López (during his own lifetime) and José Félix Estigarribia (after his death) were distinguished with the rank of Field Marshal of the Paraguayan Armies. However, this rank is just a "honorific distinction" for these two individuals who led the nation during the largest military conflicts Paraguay had to face, the Paraguayan War and the Chaco War.

Moreover, it is unknown if they ever had the garments of a Field Marshal. Solano López only received a "Marshal's Baton" but he kept wearing the uniform of a General of the Army while Estigarribia, apparently, never got nor received any type of Marshal's garments other than the honorific rank.

Officially, both Solano López and Estigarribia held the rank of General of the Armies of Paraguay.

Commissioned officer ranks

The rank insignia of commissioned officers.

Rank group	General / flag officers			Senior officers			Junior officers
Paraguayan Army
Paraguayan Army	General de ejército	General de división	General de brigada	Coronel	Teniente coronel	Mayor	Capitán	Teniente primero	Teniente	Subteniente

Other ranks

The rank insignia of non-commissioned officers and enlisted personnel.

Rank group	Senior NCOs							Junior NCOs		Enlisted
Paraguayan Army
Paraguayan Army	Sub-oficial principal	Sub-oficial mayor	Sub-oficial	Sargento ayudante	Sargento primero	Vice sargento primero	Sargento segundo	Cabo primero	Cabo segundo	Soldado

== See also ==
- Armed Forces of Paraguay
