= Chief of Staff (disambiguation) =

The chief of staff is a leader of a complex organization or coordinator of supporting staff.

Chief of Staff may also refer to:

- Chief of Staff (Barbados)
- Chief of Staff (Brazil)
- Chief of Staff (Canada)
- Chief of Staff (Ghana)
- Chief of Staff (Guyana)
- Chief of Staff (Iraq)
- Chief of Staff of the Defence Forces (Ireland)
- Chief of Staff (Ivory Coast)
- Chief of Staff (Rivers State), Nigeria
- Chief of Staff (Pakistan Army)
- Chief of Staff (Philippines)
- Chief of Staff (United Kingdom)
- Chief of Staff (United States Congress)
- Chief of Staff (Vietnam)

== Other uses ==
- Chief of Staff (TV series), a 2019 South Korean political drama
- Chiefs of Staff (quartet), an American barbershop quartet
- Chief of Staff (novel), a 1991 novel by William Coyle (Thomas Keneally)

== See also ==
- Staff (military)
- Chiefs of Staff Committee, of the British Armed Forces
- Chiefs of Staff Committee (Canada), 1951–1964
- Joint Chiefs of Staff (disambiguation)
- Chairman of the Joint Chiefs of Staff (disambiguation)
- Chief of Staff to the Prime Minister (disambiguation)
- Chief Secretary (disambiguation)
- Principal Secretary (disambiguation)
