= Westminster system =

Parliamentary system of government

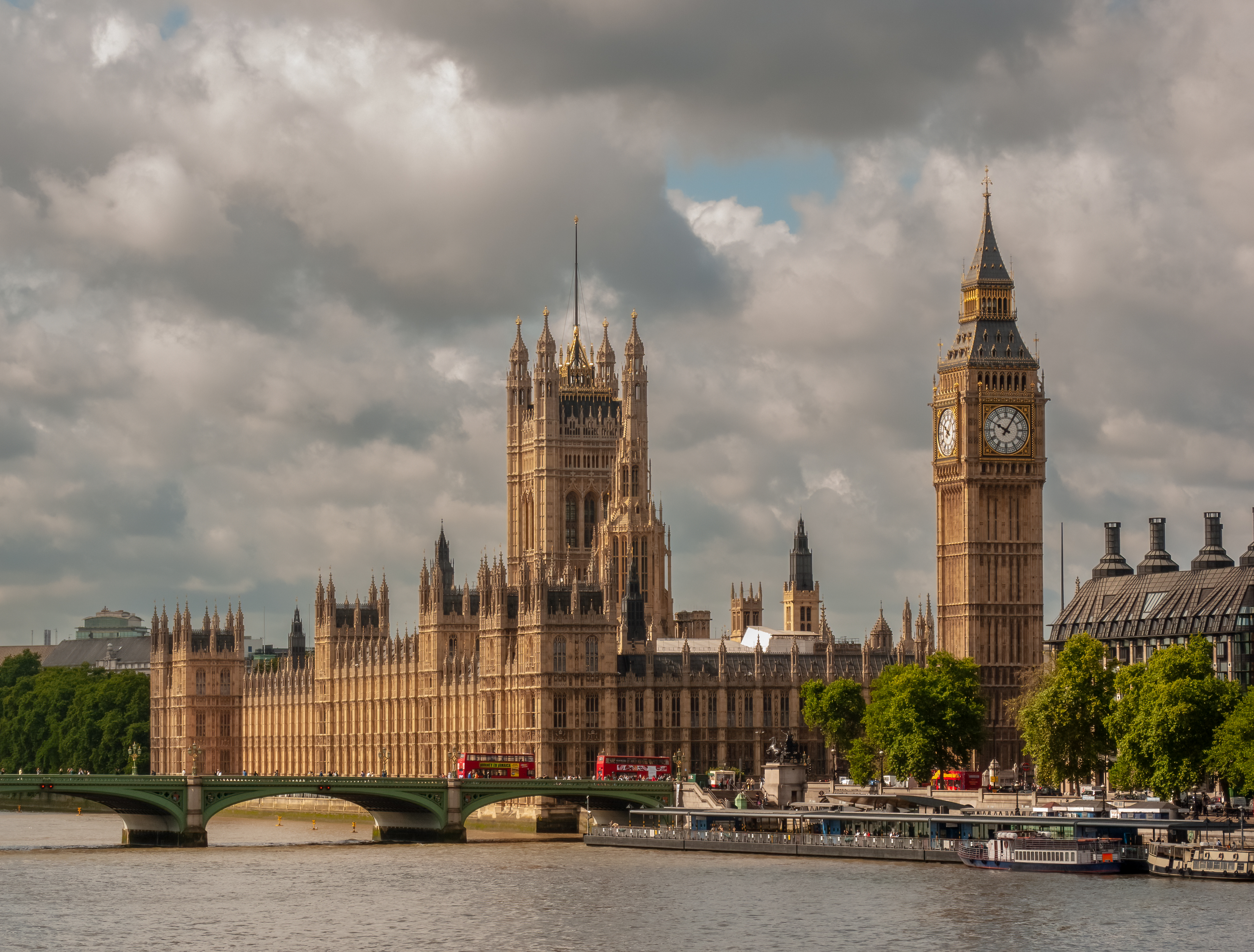
The Palace of Westminster, after which the Westminster system is named. It is the home of the UK Parliament.

The Westminster system, or Westminster model, is a type of parliamentary government found in, and elsewhere derived from, the Parliament of the United Kingdom. Key aspects of the system include an executive branch made up of members of the legislature which is responsible to the legislature, the presence of parliamentary opposition parties, and a ceremonial head of state who is separate from the head of government. The term derives from the Palace of Westminster, the seat of the British parliament. The Westminster system can be contrasted with the presidential system, which originated in the United States, and with the semi-presidential system based on the government of France.

The Westminster system is used, or was once used, in the national and subnational legislatures of most former colonies of the British Empire upon gaining self-government, beginning with the Province of Canada in 1848. However, many former colonies have since adopted other forms of government. The Parliament of the United Kingdom and the associated Westminster system played a "vanguard role" with worldwide influence on the spread of democracy, thus it is often known as "the mother of parliaments".

== Characteristics ==
A Westminster system of government includes some or all of the following elements; a particular jurisdiction operating on the Westminster model would have features such as:

- A sovereign, monarch or head of state (HOS), or representative thereof, who formally (de jure) functions as the legal and constitutional holder of executive power, and who does retain limited prerogative or reserve powers, but whose de facto roles and daily duties consist primarily of ceremonial and procedural functions, which are performed apolitically. Substantive, legal functions (eg assenting to bills) are exercised by the HOS only upon the advice of elected ministers or a council of them. Examples include the UK's King Charles III, the monarchs and governors-general in the Commonwealth realms, the presidents of many countries, and state or provincial governors in subnational jurisdictions of federal systems. Exceptions to this are Ireland and Israel, whose presidents are both de jure and de facto ceremonial, and the latter possesses no reserve powers whatsoever.
- A head of government (head of the executive) (HOG), known as the prime minister (PM), premier, chief minister, or first minister. While the HOS formally chooses a person to ask to form a government, constitutional convention requires that that person be supported by a majority of elected members in (the lower house of) the parliament. If more than half of elected parliamentarians belong to the same political party, or are willing to support a plurality party, then the parliamentary leader of that party typically is the one chosen. In turn, it is only the person with such support who is constitutionally able to 'advise' the HOS on the performance of their governmental powers and duties, advice which is typically (ie, in all but the rarest cases) taken. Under the Westminster system, a constitutional monarch or like head of state acts, in almost every case, on advice.
- An executive branch led by the head of government usually made up of members of the legislature with the senior members of the executive in a cabinet adhering to the principle of cabinet collective responsibility; such members wield authority on behalf of the nominal or theoretical executive.
- An independent, professional, non-partisan civil service with capacity to provide specialist advice upon, and implement, policies and decisions of the elected government. Civil servants hold permanent appointments, merit-based selection processes are in place, and there exists continuity of employment across changes in the party of government.
- A parliamentary opposition (as part of a two- or a multi-party system), led by an official leader of the opposition and often a full shadow cabinet, which generally and regularly takes on an adversarial role, aggressively questioning and presenting arguments against proposed policies of the extant government. In certain countries, the leader of the opposition is expected to be ready to form a government if the office of head of government (eg the prime minister) becomes vacant.
- A legislature, often bicameral, with at least one directly elected house — although unicameral systems also exist, especially in smaller polities. Traditionally, the lower house is elected using first-past-the-post voting in single-member districts (electorates), a system that tends to deliver majorities to single parties which can then form cohering governments. Variants of the Westminster model also use a complementary but different system to determine the membership of the other (usually upper) house: proportional representation (e.g. Israel, New Zealand, Denmark), parallel voting (e.g. Japan, Italy), preferential voting (e.g. Papua New Guinea, Australia), or appointment of members (eg Canada, UK).
- A regularly elected lower house of parliament with the ability functionally to remove a government, which power it can exercise by "withholding (or blocking) supply" (ie, rejecting a government's proposed budget), by passing through that house a "motion of no confidence" in the government, or likewise by defeating a confidence motion in its favour. Parliamentary sovereignty may or may not be a feature of the Westminster system; unlike Westminster itself, most legislatures modelled after it are not sovereign. Exceptions include New Zealand and Jamaica.
- A parliament that can be dissolved, even before the expiry of its term, allowing snap elections to be called at any time (rather than, say, at a regular periodic interval as in the USA). While there have been attempts at regularising the timing of elections (eg fixed terms in NZ, Victoria, the UK), placing the power to call an election in the hands of the head of the extant government is an important element of the political balance struck by many Westminster systems.
- A system of parliamentary privilege, which allows members of the legislature to discuss in the legislature any issue deemed relevant, without fear of consequences stemming from (for example) defamatory statements or publication of records thereof.
- A regular publication of a record of meetings of the legislature and speeches therein, often known as Hansard (including arguably an ability for the legislature to strike records of certain discussions from such minutes).
- A curial (judicial) ability authoritatively to interpret constitutional arrangements, and likewise to address silences, lacunae or ambiguities in statutory law, through judicial decisions that are respected by politicians or that validly 'develop' the common law. Another concomitant assemblage of legal principles, known as the law of equity, also exists in most Westminster systems. Westminster models, including those of India, Quebec, Scotland, and elsewhere, are part of and effective within multifarious legal systems; in most of these, the common law is mixed with equity and civil law and other systems of constitutional and legal principal and judicial decision-making.

Most of the procedures of the Westminster system originated with the conventions, practices, and precedents of the Parliament of the United Kingdom, which form a part of an assemblage that together is understood to form a largely unwritten—an unconsolidated but cognisable—Constitution of the United Kingdom. Unlike this uncodified—or at least not codified in a single place—British constitution, most jurisdictions using a variant of the Westminster system have codified their system, at least the bones of it, in a unitary basic law that has usually been entitled a constitution.

However, uncodified conventions, practices, norms and precedents continue to play a significant role in most countries, as many constitutions do not specify all elements of constitutional government and procedure. For example, some older constitutions of jurisdictions using the Westminster system do not explicitly mention the existence of the cabinet or the prime minister: these elements of government were assumed by constitutional authors, or it was thought too difficult or unwise to seek to describe them — better to rely on some constitutional conventions as such and as is than to attempt to fix their legal definition by explication. Sometimes these conventions, reserve powers, strategic ambiguities and political influences collide, causing political crises, while at other times the flexibility of the Westminster systems forestalls crises and facilitates compromise between constitutional actors. At such moments, the weaknesses of unwritten 'norms' and unclear powers, as well as the benefits of governmental flexibility and constitutional ability to evolve, become evident. An illustrative example of such controversy is provided by the Australian constitutional crisis of 1975, wherein the appointed vice-regal governor-general (John Kerr), acting on his own motion and absent ministerial advice, dismissed an unsuspecting and duly elected prime minister (Gough Whitlam), in order to facilitate both an attempt by the opposition to secure supply in the Senate and the holding of new elections for both houses of parliament.

=== Summary of the typical structure of the Westminster model ===
Type
Bicameral (unicameral in some circumstances)
Elected or appointed upper house to approve and/or scrutinise laws.
- Senate, Legislative Council, House of Lords

Elected lower house to represent the people and (normally) initiate legislation.
- House of Commons, House of Representatives, Legislative Assembly

Leadership
Head of state
Monarch (sometimes represented by a vice-regal representative, such as a governor or governor-general) or ceremonial president.

Head of government
Usually the leader of the largest party in the lower house (legislature if unicameral).
- Prime minister in a sovereign state/country
- Premier/chief minister in provinces, states, or territories.
- Other titles include first minister, chief executive, president of the council of ministers.

Presiding officers of legislative chambers
Speaker (or president) of the upper house

Speaker of the lower house independent of executive government, and in some cases 'post-party political'

General
Government
Formed by the largest party/coalition in the lower house (legislature if unicameral), and led by the head of government.
- Executive ministers are chosen (normally) from members of the government party or coalition, by the head of government. They may be from either house in bicameral systems.
- A Cabinet is formed from the most senior ministers. May in unusual cases include coopted civil servants.
- In parliaments without political parties, ministers are either chosen by the prime minister or by the house itself.
- Government sits in and is responsible to the legislature, to which it reports and is accountable (in particular, to the lower house, if bicameral).

Opposition
Led by the leader of the opposition. A shadow cabinet is formed out of the elected members of the largest party or coalition in the legislature not in government, chosen by the party leader (the leader of the opposition).

Public service
Politically independent and available to the people of the state, that will work for various government organisations (health, housing, education, defence).

== Operation ==
The pattern of executive functions within a Westminster system is quite complex. In essence, the head of state, usually a monarch or president, is a ceremonial figurehead who is the theoretical, nominal, or de jure source of executive power within the system. In practice, such a figure does not actively exercise executive powers, even though executive authority is nominally exercised in their name.

The head of government, usually called the prime minister or premier, will ideally have the support of a majority in the responsible house, and must, in any case, be able to ensure the existence of no absolute majority against the government. If the parliament passes a motion of no confidence, or refuses to pass an important bill such as the budget, then the government must either resign so that a different government can be appointed or seek a parliamentary dissolution so that new general elections may be held in order to re-confirm or deny the government's mandate.

Executive authority within a Westminster system is de jure exercised by the cabinet as a whole, along with more junior ministers, however, in effect, the head of government dominates the executive as the head of government is ultimately the person from whom the head of state will take advice (by constitutional convention) on the exercise of executive power, including the appointment and dismissal of cabinet members. This results in the situation where individual cabinet members in effect serve at the pleasure of the prime minister. Thus the cabinet is strongly subordinate to the prime minister as they can be replaced at any time, or can be moved ("demoted") to a different portfolio in a cabinet reshuffle for "underperforming".

In the United Kingdom, the sovereign theoretically holds executive authority, even though the prime minister and the cabinet effectively implement executive powers. In a parliamentary republic like India, the president is the de jure executive, even though executive powers are essentially instituted by the prime minister and the Council of Ministers. In Israel, however, executive power is vested de jure and de facto in the cabinet and the president is de jure and de facto a ceremonial figurehead.

As an example, the prime minister and cabinet (as the de facto executive body in the system) generally must seek the permission of the head of state when carrying out executive functions. If, for instance the British prime minister wished to dissolve Parliament in order for a general election to take place, the prime minister is constitutionally bound to request permission from the sovereign in order to attain such a wish. However, the sovereign, in modern times, has virtually always followed the advice of their prime minister without their own agency. This owes to the fact that the British sovereign is a constitutional monarch. The monarch abides by the advice of their ministers, except when executing reserve powers in times of crisis. The sovereign's power to appoint and dismiss governments, appoint cabinet ministers to serve in the government, appoint diplomats, declare war, and to sign treaties (among other powers de jure held by the sovereign) is known as the royal prerogative, which in modern times is exercised by the sovereign solely on the advice of the Prime Minister.

This custom also occurs in other countries are regions around the world using the Westminster System, as a legacy of British colonial rule. In Commonwealth realms such as Canada, Australia and New Zealand, the day-to-day functions that would be exercised by the sovereign personally in the United Kingdom are instead exercised by the governor-general. In such nations, the prime minister is obligated to formally seek permission from the governor-general when implementing executive decisions, in a manner similar to the British system.

An analogous scenario also exists in republics in the Commonwealth of Nations, such as India or Trinidad and Tobago, where there is a president who functions similarly to a governor-general.

An unusual case lies in Israel and Japan, where the respective prime ministers have the full legal power to implement executive decisions, and presidential (in Israel) or imperial (in Japan) approval is not required; the prime ministers of these nations are fully the de jure source of executive authority, and not the head of state.

The head of state will often hold meetings with the head of government and cabinet, as a means of keeping abreast of governmental policy and as a means of advising, consulting and warning ministers in their actions. Such a practice takes place in the United Kingdom and India. In the UK, the sovereign holds confidential weekly meetings with the prime minister to discuss governmental policy and to offer their opinions and advice on issues of the day. In India, the prime minister is constitutionally bound to hold regular sessions with the president, in a similar manner to the aforementioned British practice. In essence, the head of state, as the theoretical executive authority, "reigns but does not rule". This phrase means that the head of state's role in government is generally ceremonial and as a result does not directly institute executive powers. The reserve powers of the head of state are sufficient to ensure compliance with some of their wishes. However, the extent of such powers varies from one country to another and is often a matter of controversy.

Such an executive arrangement first emerged in the United Kingdom. Historically, the British sovereign held and directly exercised all executive authority. George I of Great Britain (reigned 1714 to 1727) was the first British monarch to delegate some executive powers to a prime minister and a cabinet of the ministers, largely because he was also the Elector of Hanover in Germany and did not speak English fluently. Over time, further arrangements continued to allow the execution of executive authority on the sovereign's behalf and more and more de facto power ended up lying in the Prime Minister's hands. Such a concept was reinforced in The English Constitution (1876) by Walter Bagehot, who distinguished between the separate "dignified" and "efficient" functions of government. The sovereign should be a focal point for the nation ("dignified"), while the PM and cabinet actually undertook executive decisions ("efficient").

== Electoral system, ministers and officials ==
The electoral system is often set out in a Representation of the People Act. Common ministerial titles include parliamentary secretary and under-secretary. Ministers are supported by private secretaries and government departments are run by permanent secretaries, principal secretaries or chief secretaries.

== Role of the head of state ==
The head of state or their representative (such as a governor-general) formally appoints as the head of government whoever commands the confidence of the lower or sole house of the legislature and invites him or her to form a government. In the UK, this is known as kissing hands. Although the dissolution of the legislature and the call for new elections is formally performed by the head of state, the head of state, by convention, acts according to the wishes of the head of government.

A president, monarch, or governor-general might possess clearly significant reserve powers. Examples of the use of such powers include the Australian constitutional crisis of 1975 and the Canadian King–Byng affair in 1926. The Lascelles Principles were an attempt to create a convention to cover similar situations, but have not been tested in practice. Because of differences in their written constitutions, the formal powers of monarchs, governors-general, and presidents vary greatly from one country to another. However, as sovereigns and governors-general are not elected, and some presidents may not be directly elected by the people, they are often shielded from any public disapproval stemming from unilateral or controversial use of their powers.

In many Commonwealth realms a governor-general formally represents the monarch, who is usually absent from the realm. In such countries, the identity of the "head of state" may be unclear.

== Cabinet government ==
In the book The English Constitution, Walter Bagehot emphasised the divide of the constitution into two components, the Dignified (that part which is symbolic) and the Efficient (the way things actually work and get done), and called the Efficient "Cabinet Government".

Members of the Cabinet are collectively seen as responsible for government policy, a policy termed cabinet collective responsibility. All Cabinet decisions are made by consensus, a vote is rarely taken in a Cabinet meeting. All ministers, whether senior and in the Cabinet, or junior ministers, must support the policy of the government publicly regardless of any private reservations. When a Cabinet reshuffle is imminent, a lot of time is taken up in the conversations of politicians and in the news media, speculating on who will, or will not, be moved in and out of the Cabinet by the Prime Minister, because the appointment of ministers to the Cabinet, and threat of dismissal from the Cabinet, is the single most powerful constitutional power which a Prime Minister has in the political control of the Government in the Westminster system.

The Official Opposition and other major political parties not in the Government, will mirror the governmental organisation with their own Shadow cabinet made up of Shadow Ministers.

== Bicameral and unicameral parliaments ==
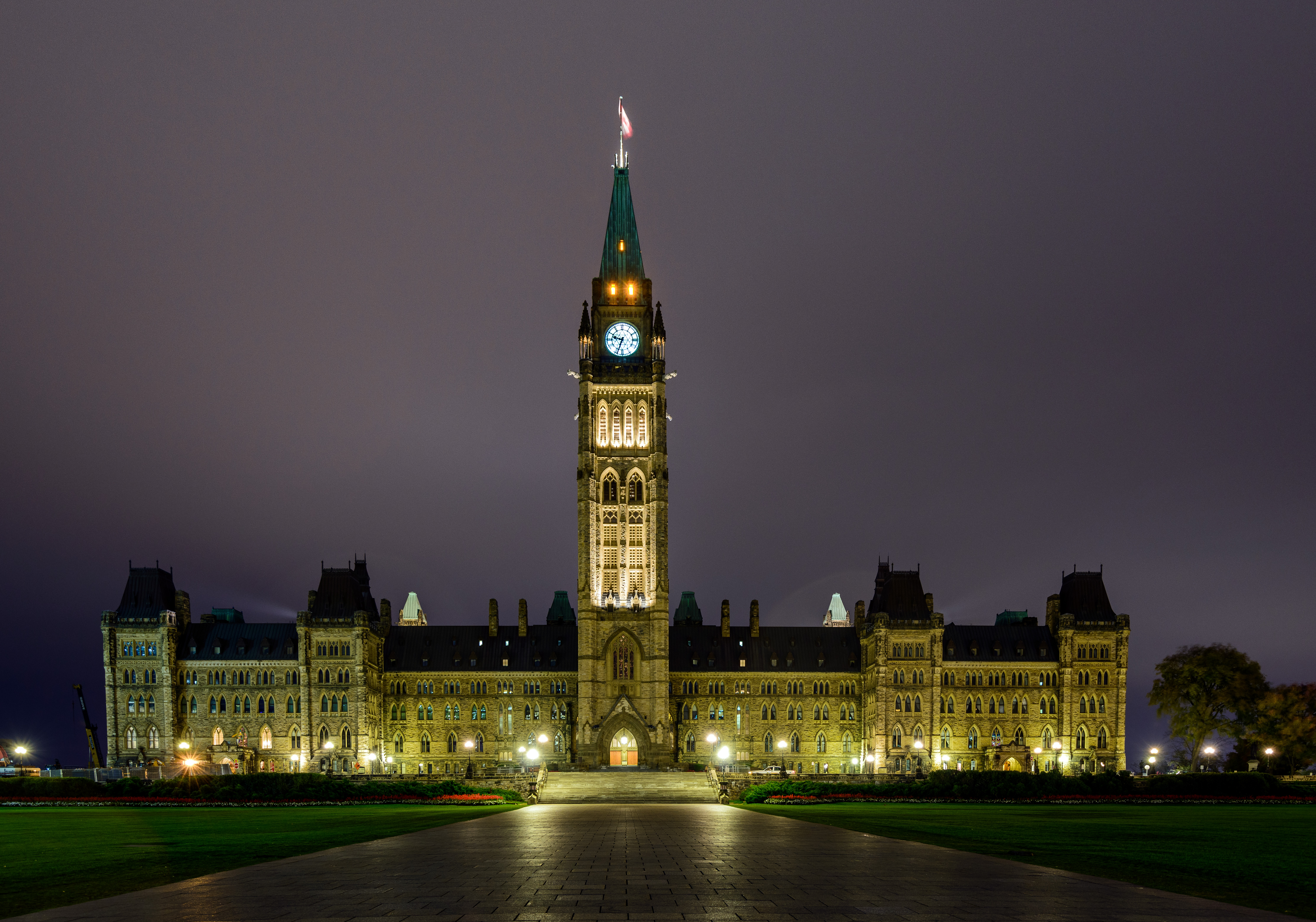
Canadian Parliament at night

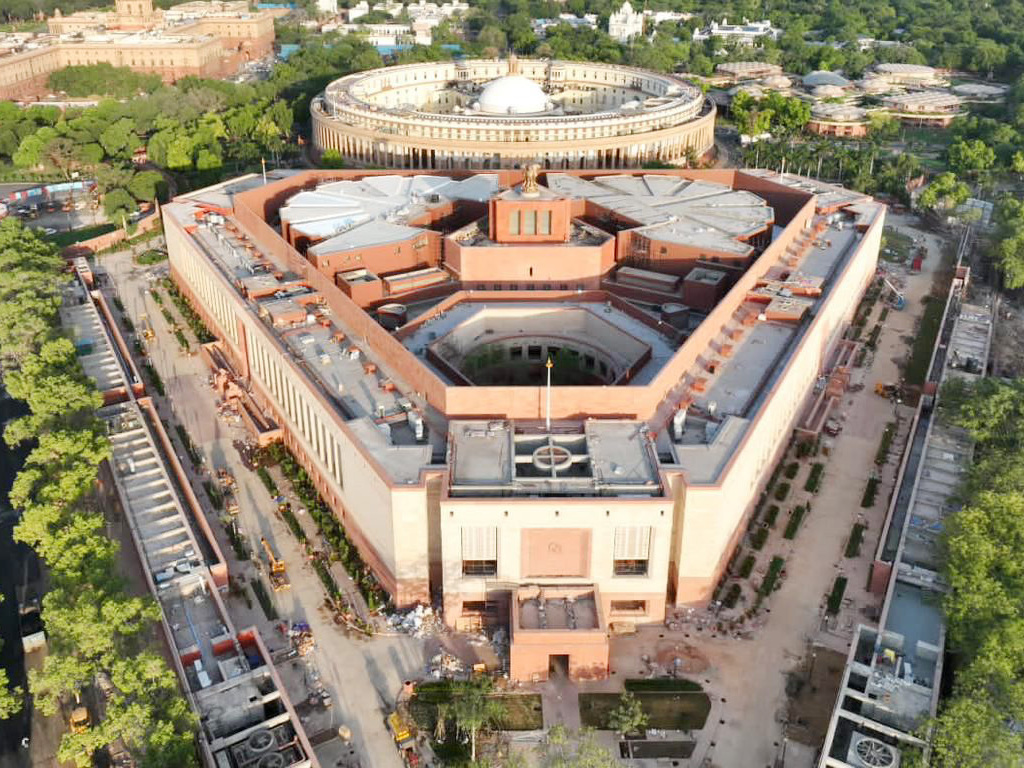
The Sansad Bhavan (Parliament House) building in New Delhi, India

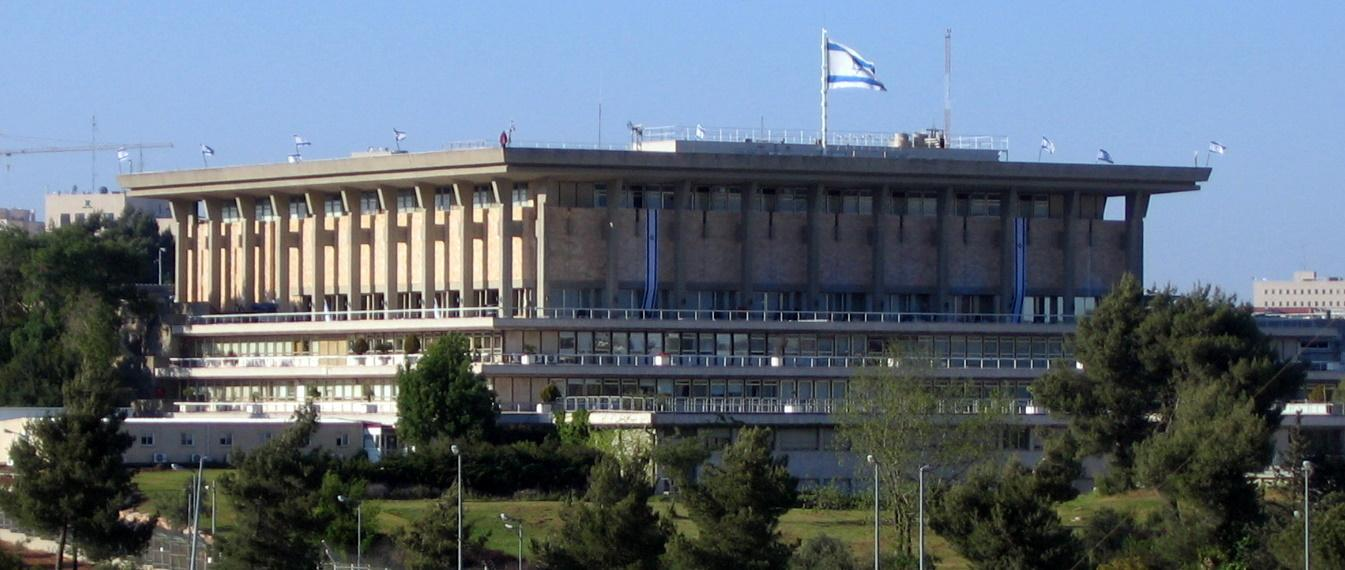
Knesset Building, Jerusalem

In a Westminster system, some members of parliament are elected by popular vote, while others are appointed. Nearly all Westminster-based parliaments have a lower house with powers based on those of the House of Commons (under various names), comprising local, elected representatives of the people (with the only exception being elected entirely by nationwide Proportional Representation). Most also have a smaller upper house, which is made up of members chosen by various methods:

- Termless appointees, either lifetime or retiring, from successive prime ministers (such as the Senate of Canada)
- Appointees of the premier and the opposition leader (such as the Jamaican Senate)
- Direct election (such as the Australian Senate)
- Election by electoral colleges or sub-national legislatures (such as the Indian Rajya Sabha)
- Hereditary nobility (such as the British House of Lords until the House of Lords Act 1999)
- Any combination of the above (such as the Malaysian Senate)
- A prime minister can be elected without gaining a majority of the popular vote.

In the UK, the lower house is the de facto legislative body, while the upper house practices restraint in exercising its constitutional powers and serves as a consultative body. In other Westminster countries, however, the upper house can sometimes exercise considerable power, as is the case for the Australian Senate.

Some Westminster-derived parliaments are unicameral for two reasons:

- The New Zealand Parliament, Parliament of Queensland, and the parliaments of the Canadian provinces of Manitoba, New Brunswick, Nova Scotia, Prince Edward Island, and Quebec have abolished their upper houses.
- The parliaments of all other Canadian provinces, the Parliament of Malta, the Papua New Guinea Parliament, the Legislative Council of Hong Kong and the Israeli Parliament never had upper houses.

Hong Kong, a former British crown colony and currently a special administrative region of the People's Republic of China, has a unicameral Legislative Council. While the Legislative Councils in British Australasian and North American colonies were unelected upper houses and some of them had since abolished themselves, the Legislative Council of Hong Kong has remained the sole chamber and had in 1995 evolved into a fully elected house, yet only 20 of the 90 seats are returned by universal suffrage. Responsible government was never granted during British colonial rule, and the Governor remained the head of government until the transfer of sovereignty in 1997, when the role was replaced by the Chief Executive. Secretaries had remained to be chosen by the Chief Executive not from the Legislative Council, and their appointments need not be approved by the Legislative Council. Although essentially more presidential than parliamentary, the Legislative Council had inherited many elements of the Westminster system, including parliamentary powers, privileges and immunity, and the right to conduct inquiries, amongst others. The theme colour of the meeting chamber is red as in other upper houses. The Chief Executive may dissolve the Legislative Council under certain conditions, and is obliged to resign, e.g., when a re-elected Legislative Council passes again a bill that he or she had refused to sign.

== "Washminster system" ==
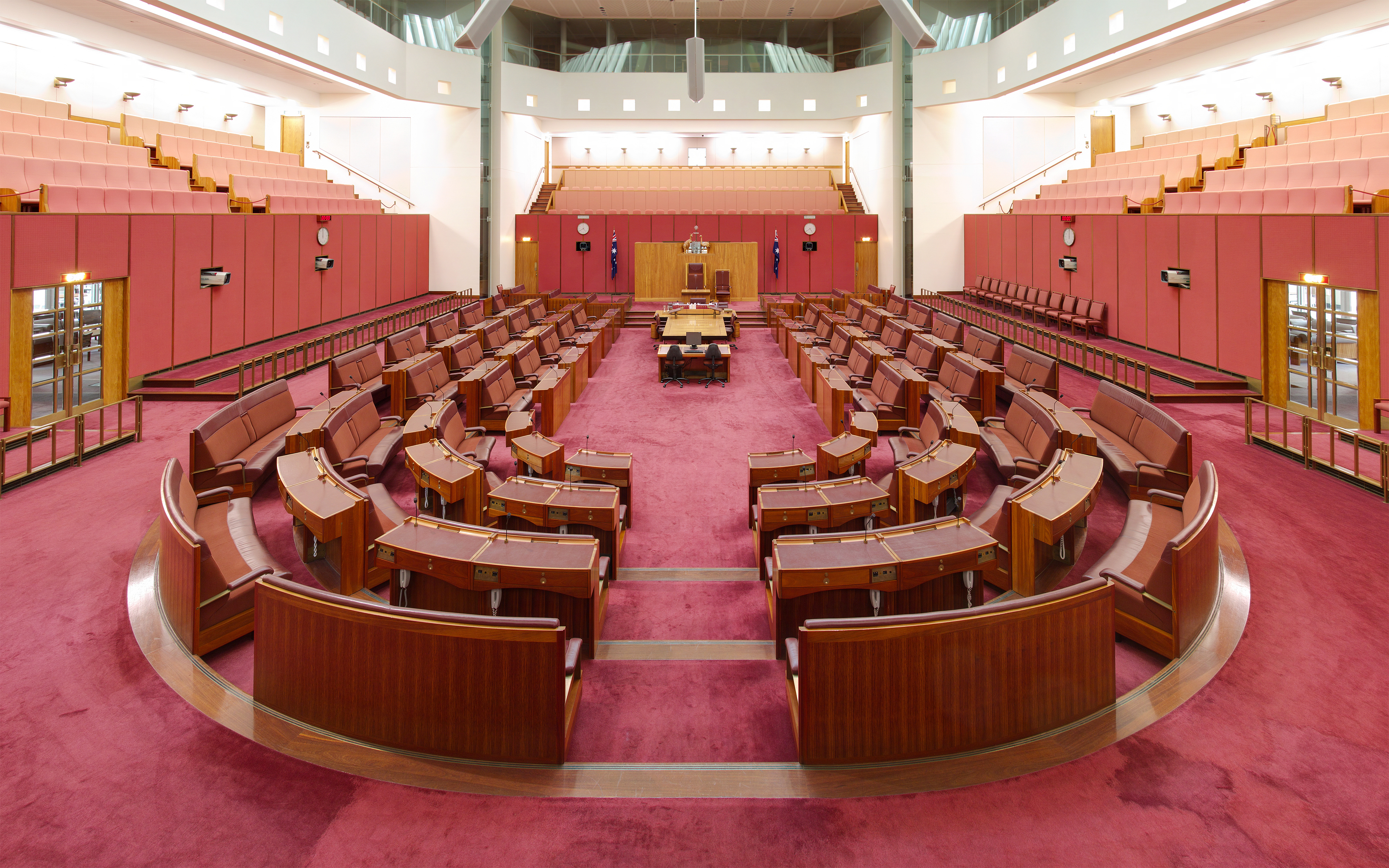
The Australian Senate

The waters of the Thames and of the Potomac both flow into Lake Burley Griffin.

— James Killen, Farewell Parliament House - Sunday May 8, 1988

Australian constitutional law is, in many aspects, a unique hybrid with influences from the United States Constitution as well as from the traditions and conventions of the Westminster system and some indigenous features. Australia is exceptional because the government faces a fully elected upper house, the Senate, which must be willing to pass all its legislation. Although government is formed in the lower house, the House of Representatives, the support of the Senate is necessary in order to govern.

The Australian Senate is unusual in that it maintains an ability to withhold supply from the government of the day – a power similar to that held in the UK until 1911 by the House of Lords, which has since then been impossible, in the Westminster system. A government that has lost supply is severely restricted in its abilities to act; unless a solution can be negotiated and supply can be restored, such an occurrence would normally trigger a federal election. Since the governor-general, technically speaking, can dismiss a federal government at any time, loss of supply is sometimes, controversially, considered a suitable trigger for a dismissal (such as with the 1975 Australian constitutional crisis). This is controversial because it conflicts with the Westminster tradition of government by a party with the confidence of the lower house (not an upper house like the Senate). Some political scientists have held that the Australian system of government was consciously devised as a blend or hybrid of the Westminster and the United States systems of government, especially since the Australian Senate is a powerful upper house like the US Senate; this notion is expressed in the nickname "the Washminster mutation". The ability of upper houses to block supply also features in the parliaments of most Australian states.

The Australian system has also been referred to as a semi-parliamentary system.

== Ceremonies ==
The Westminster system has a very distinct appearance when functioning, with many British customs incorporated into day-to-day government function. A Westminster-style parliament is usually a long, rectangular room, with two rows of seats and desks on either side. Many chambers connect the opposing rows, either with a perpendicular row of seats and desks at the furthermost point from the Speaker's Chair at the opposite end of the chamber (e.g. UK House of Lords or Israel Knesset) or the rows of chairs and desks are rounded at the end, opposite to the Speaker's Chair (e.g. Australian chambers, Ireland, South Africa, India). The chairs in which both the government and opposition sit, are positioned so that the two rows are facing each other. This arrangement is said to have derived from an early parliament which was held in a church choir. Traditionally, the opposition parties will sit in one row of seats, and the government party will sit in the other. In some countries, the mace will face the government's side whilst lying on the table of the House. In most majority governments, the number of government-party MPs is so large that it must use the "opposition" seats as well. In the lower house at Westminster (the UK's House of Commons) there are lines on the floor in front of the government and opposition benches that members may cross only when exiting the chamber.

At one end of the room sits a large chair, for the Speaker of the House. The speaker usually wears black robes, and in some countries, a wig. Robed parliamentary clerks often sit at narrow tables between the two rows of seats, as well. These narrow tables in the centre of the chamber are usually where ministers or members of the house come to speak. A newly elected Speaker is symbolically dragged to the Chair upon being elected.

Other ceremonies sometimes associated with the Westminster system include an annual Speech from the Throne (or equivalent thereof) in which the head of state gives a special address (written by the government) to parliament about what kind of policies to expect in the coming year, and lengthy State Opening of Parliament ceremonies that often involve the presentation of a large ceremonial mace. Some legislatures retain Westminster's colour-coded chambers, with the upper houses associated with the colour red (after the House of Lords) and the lower with green (after the House of Commons). This is the case in India, Australia, Canada, New Zealand, and Barbados.

== Current countries ==
Countries that use variations on the theme of the Westminster system, as of 2023, include the following:

| Country | Legislature | System of govt. | Notes/Differences from the standard Westminster model |
|---|---|---|---|
| Antigua and Barbuda | Parliament: Senate; House of Representatives | Monarchy | |
| Australia | Parliament: Senate; House of Representatives | Monarchy | Federated nation, meaning that the power to govern the country and its people is shared and divided between national and state governments. Lower house is elected using instant-runoff voting. Upper house is elected by single transferable vote (a form of proportional representation) with each state and territory treated as individual electorates. Queensland has a unicameral state parliament while all other states have bicameral parliaments. The Australian Capital Territory and the Northern Territory have unicameral legislatures. |
| The Bahamas | Parliament: Senate; House of Assembly | Monarchy | |
| Bangladesh | Jatiya Sangsad | Republic | Allows some extra-parliamentary ministers to be appointed, which is a variation from the strict monism of most Westminster systems. |
| Barbados | Parliament: Senate; House of Assembly | Republic | |
| Belize | National Assembly: Senate; House of Assembly | Monarchy | |
| Canada | Parliament: Senate; House of Commons | Monarchy | Federated nation, meaning that the power to govern the country and its people is shared and divided between national and provincial governments. Caucuses require official party status for some parliamentary privileges. Two of its territorial parliaments operate without any caucuses other than cabinet, and therefore have no leader of the opposition. |
| Cayman Islands | Parliament | Monarchy | British Overseas Territory, meaning ultimate authority for its government resides with the UK Parliament in Westminster |
| Dominica | House of Assembly | Republic | |
| Fiji | Parliament | Republic | |
| Grenada | Parliament: Senate; House of Representatives | Monarchy | |
| India | Parliament: Rajya Sabha; Lok Sabha | Republic | Federated nation, meaning that the power to govern the country and its people is shared and divided between national and state governments. The Lok Sabha (lower house) is popularly elected via first past the post. The Rajya Sabha (upper house) is mostly elected by the members of state/union territory legislatures using single transferable vote with a handful of members being appointed by the President of India. |
| (Republic of Ireland) Ireland | Oireachtas: Seanad Éireann; Dáil Éireann | Republic | Dáil Éireann (the lower house) is elected by universal suffrage by single transferable vote from constituencies of 3 to 5 members. President is directly elected using instant-runoff voting. The Head of government has the title of Taoiseach (in the Irish language meaning roughly "chieftain" or "leader") and is appointed by the president on the nomination of the Dáil. |
| Jamaica | Parliament: Senate; House of Representatives | Monarchy | |
| Lesotho | Parliament: Senate; National Assembly | Monarchy | Constitutional monarchy that operates under a Westminster system. |
| Malaysia | Parliament: Dewan Negara; Dewan Rakyat | Monarchy (elective) | Federated nation, meaning that the power to govern the country and its people is shared and divided between national and state governments. The Yang-di-Pertuan Agong shares characteristics of heads of state in both monarchies and republics. |
| Malta | Parliament | Republic | |
| Mauritius | National Assembly | Republic | |
| Nepal | Parliament: National Assembly; House of Representatives | Republic | Federated nation, meaning that the power to govern the country and its people is shared and divided between national and state governments. |
| New Zealand | Parliament | Monarchy | Uses mixed-member proportional representation to elect members to its unicameral Parliament. Several seats in NZ Parliament are reserved for election by Indigenous Māori voters. |
| Pakistan | Parliament: Senate; National Assembly | Republic | Federated nation, meaning that the power to govern the country and its people is shared and divided between national and provincial governments. |
| Papua New Guinea | Parliament | Monarchy | One significant deviation it has from the traditional Westminster model is that a person is nominated for the position of Governor-General not by the Prime Minister but by a majority vote in Parliament, then they are appointed by the monarch. Members are elected to the Parliament by instant-runoff voting. |
| Saint Kitts and Nevis | National Assembly | Monarchy | Federated nation, meaning that the power to govern the country and its people is shared and divided between national and subnational governments. |
| Saint Lucia | Parliament: Senate; House of Assembly | Monarchy | |
| Saint Vincent and the Grenadines | House of Assembly | Monarchy | |
| Samoa | Legislative Assembly | Republic | |
| Singapore | Parliament | Republic | President is directly elected by first-past-the-post voting. One significant deviation it has from the traditional Westminster model is that the Leader of the Opposition is formally designated by the Prime Minister. This means that, unlike the previous de facto arrangement that followed Westminster convention, the office does not automatically go to the leader of the largest opposition party, and could be reassigned at the discretion of the Prime Minister. |
| Solomon Islands | Parliament of the Solomon Islands | Monarchy | One significant deviation it has from the traditional Westminster model is that a person is nominated for the position of Governor-General not by the Prime Minister but by a majority vote in Parliament, then they are appointed by the monarch, similar to neighboring Papua New Guinea. |
| Thailand | National Assembly: Senate; House of Representatives | Monarchy | Political parties must nominate a person they want to be prime minister to the Election Commission before the general election, a party can nominate of candidate list up to three names, the nominee does not have to be a member of the party, and a political parties must receive at least 5% of the seats in the House of Representatives in order to be able to nominate the person that the party previously proposed to the Election Commission to the House of Representatives for approval. Members of the House of Representatives are elected using parallel voting. Allows some extra-parliamentary ministers to be appointed, which is a variation from the strict monism of most Westminster systems. |
| Trinidad and Tobago | Parliament: Senate; House of Representatives | Republic | |
| Tuvalu | Parliament | Monarchy | |
| United Kingdom | Parliament: House of Lords; House of Commons | Monarchy | Between 2011 (Fixed-term Parliaments Act 2011) and 2022 (Dissolution and Calling of Parliament Act 2022), the Prime Minister did not have the ability to call early elections. |
| Vanuatu | Parliament | Republic | |

== Former countries ==
The Westminster system was adopted by a number of countries which subsequently evolved or reformed their system of government departing from the original model. In some cases, certain aspects of the Westminster system were retained or codified in their constitutions. For instance South Africa and Botswana, unlike Commonwealth realms or parliamentary republics such as India, have a combined head of state and head of government but the President remains responsible to the lower house of parliament; it elects the President at the beginning of a new Parliament, or when there is a vacancy in the office, or when the sitting President is defeated on a vote of confidence. If the Parliament cannot elect a new President within a short period of time (a week to a month) the lower house is dissolved and new elections are called.

- Ireland between the 14th century and 1800 (see Parliament of Ireland), when the Act of Union joined it with Great Britain to form the United Kingdom.
- Union of South Africa between 1910 and 1961, and the Republic of South Africa between 1961 and 1984. The 1983 constitution abolished the Westminster system in South Africa.
- Dominion of Newfoundland between 1907 and 1934, the year self-government was suspended and the Commission of Government assumed direct rule from London. Use of the Westminster system resumed in 1949 when Newfoundland became a province of Canada.
- Rhodesia between 1965 and 1979, and Zimbabwe between 1980 and 1987. The 1987 constitution abolished the Westminster system.
- Nigeria following the end of British colonial rule in 1960, which resulted in the appointment of a Governor-General and then a President, Nnamdi Azikiwe. The system ended with the military coup of 1966.
- Ceylon between 1948 and 1972, and Sri Lanka from 1972 until 1978 when the constitution was remodelled into an Executive presidential system.
- Burma following independence in 1948 until the 1962 military coup d'état.
- Ghana between 1957 and 1960, then 1969 and 1972.
- State of Somaliland during its brief independence in 1960, with Muhammad Haji Ibrahim Egal as its first and only Prime Minister.
- Eswatini (then known as Swaziland) between 1968 and 1973.
- Tanganyika between 1961 and 1962.
- Sierra Leone between 1961 and 1971.
- Uganda between 1962 and 1963.
- Indonesia between 1949 and 1959.
- Kenya between 1963 and 1964.
- Malawi between 1964 and 1966.
- The Gambia between 1965 and 1970.
- Guyana between 1966 and 1980.
- Kingdom of Iraq between 1921 and 1958; during the monarchy, the Parliament of Iraq was a bicameral parliament made of an upper house of lords and a lower house of commons and was modelled after the Westminster system with some adjustments.
- Kingdom of Egypt between 1923 and 1953; after the 1919 Egyptian revolution the Parliament of Egypt was made to follow the exact model of the Westminster system.
- Kingdom of Afghanistan between 1964 and the end of the monarchy in 1973.
- Empire of Japan between 1890 and 1940; under the Meiji Constitution the Diet of Japan was a bicameral legislature modelled after both the German Reichstag and the Westminster system. Influence from the Westminster system remained in Japan's Postwar Constitution.

== See also ==
- Bill of Rights 1689
- English Civil War
- Glorious Revolution
- His Majesty's Government
- History of parliamentarism
- History of the constitution of the United Kingdom § Worldwide influence
- Loyal opposition
- Magna Carta
- Parliamentary system
- Parliament in the Making
- Parliament of England
- Petition of Right
- Presidential system
- Representation of the People Act

== Bibliography ==
- Rhodes, R. A.W.; Wanna, John; Weller, Patrick (2009). Comparing Westminster. Oxford University Press. ISBN 978-0191609817.
- Galligan, Brian; Brenton, Scott, eds. (2015). Constitutional Conventions in Westminster Systems. Cambridge University Press. ISBN 978-1107100244.
- The English Constitution, Walter Bagehot, 1876. ISBN 0-521-46535-4. ISBN 0-521-46942-2.
- British Cabinet Government, Simon James, Pub Routledge, 1999. ISBN 0-415-17977-7.
- Prime Minister & Cabinet Government, Neil MacNaughton, 1999. ISBN 0-340-74759-5.
- Westminster Legacies: Democracy and Responsible Government in Asia and the Pacific, Haig Patapan, John Wanna, Patrick Weller, 2005. ISBN 0-868-40848-4.
