= Secretary (disambiguation) =

A secretary is usually an administrative support worker.

Secretary may also refer to:

== Positions ==
- Secretary (title), an official title for various positions of leadership

=== Government ===
- Secretary to the Government of Bangladesh, an administrative head of a ministry or a department
- Secretary to the Government of India, an administrative head of a ministry or a department
- Cabinet Secretary
- Secretary of State, in several countries, a senior government position
- Departmental secretary, the most senior public servant of an Australian government ministry
- Parliamentary secretary, a junior minister
- Permanent secretary, the most senior public servant of a government ministry
- A diplomatic rank
- Secretary to the President of the United States
- Principal Secretary (disambiguation)
- Private Secretary to the Sovereign, United Kingdom
- Private secretary, a public servant working for a minister

=== Head or official in organizations ===
- First Secretary (disambiguation)
- General Secretary
- Party Committee Secretary
- Secretary-General
- Secretary (club), the head of an organization's day-to-day administration
- Company secretary, a senior, usually board level, position in a private or public company
- Mishu, a private secretary to officials in the Chinese Communist Party

== Places ==
- Secretary, Maryland, a town in the United States
- Secretary Island, an island of New Zealand

== Books ==
- The Secretary, a poem by Matthew Prior written at The Hague, in 1696
- The Secretary, a poem by Peter Redgrove

== Film and television ==
- Secretary (1976 film), a 1976 Indian Telugu-language film directed by K.S. Prakash Rao
- Secretary (2002 film), a 2002 American film directed by Steven Shainber and starring Maggie Gyllenhaal and James Spader
- Secretary (2006 film), a 2006 Australian television film
- The Secretary (1938 film), a 1938 Indian Hindi-language film directed by Chaturbhuj Doshi
- The Secretary (1995 film), a 1995 American film directed by Andrew Lane
- "The Secretary" (Seinfeld), an episode of the television series Seinfeld
- Private Secretary (TV series), an American situation comedy starring Ann Sothern

== Music ==
- "Secretary", a song by Betty Wright, 1974
- "The Secretary", a song by Sailor (band), 1990

== Other uses ==
- Secretarybird, an African bird of prey
- Secretary desk, a desk with a hinged surface
- Secretary hand, a style of European handwriting developed in the early sixteenth century
- The Secretary (play), an 1843 play by James Sheridan Knowles

== See also ==
- General secretary
- Company secretary
- Secretariat (disambiguation)
- Personal assistant
- Undersecretary
