= Caroline Nyawira Murage =

Nominee for Principal Secretary for Correctional Services
- President: William Ruto

Personal details
- Occupation: Politician
- Known for: Appointment as Principal Secretary nominee

Caroline Nyawira Murage is a Kenyan politician and was among the 11 women appointed as Permanent Secretary by President Ruto in 2022.

== Career ==
Murage was appointed as the Principal Secretary in the Ministry of Interior and National Administration (state department for correctional services). She later withdrew from the position before the vetting process by Parliament due to the noise that came through online platforms in relation to the Kariuki family in Kirinyaga County having many posts in high government offices. She was replaced by Mary Muthoni Muriuki as a Correctional Services PS upon being appointed by President William Ruto in November 2022.

== Personal life ==
Murage is married to George Kariuki who is a Member of the National Assembly of Kenya.

== See also ==
- Ministry of Interior and National Administration
- William Ruto
- Politics of Kenya
