= Divisional Public Schools and Colleges =

Series of schools in Punjab, Pakistan

Divisional Public Schools
- Bahawalnagar • D.G Khan • Faisalabad • Gujranwala • Gujrat • Jaranwala • Lahore • Lalamusa • Okara • Rawalpindi • Sahiwal • Sargodha, Punjab; Pakistan

Information
- School type: Semi-Private, Independent school, Selective school, Boarding school
- Established: 1963
- Status: Active
- School board: BISE, CIE and Edexcel
- Gender: Boys and girls
- Houses: Names vary with campus. Colours:
- Website: www.dpsrwp.edu.pk • www.dpslahore.edu.pk • dpsfsd.edu.pk

Divisional Public Schools and Colleges (DPS or DPSC), established in 1963, is a series of mega-schools at the division level in Punjab, Pakistan. The series consists of one of the largest institutions providing education at school level in Pakistan. They are selective schools. The scheme of Divisional Public Schools was initiated in 1958–59, when the "Sharif Commission", a special commission on national education for secondary education submitted detailed recommendations on primary through post-graduate education.

Such institutions were named Divisional Public Schools; the funds required to initiate their operation and maintenance were to be generated through private philanthropy. These institutions were not allowed to charge fee more than the minimum necessary expenditures.

All the Divisional Public Schools are the offshoots of this plan and owe their existence to the recommendations of the Sharif Commission. The first two schools were simultaneously built in Faisalabad and in Lahore's Model Town neighbourhood in 1963. Later, such schools were established in Sahiwal, Sargodha, Gujranwala, Rawalpindi and Dera Ghazi Khan.

Divisional Public Schools are the largest schools regarding their area in almost all cities, except Lahore where Aitchison College is largest.

Divisional Commissioners are generally the chairmen of BOG of Divisional Public Schools.

== Schools ==
=== First two Schools ===
- Divisional Public School Faisalabad.
- Divisional Public School, Model Town, Lahore.

The following autonomous campuses are currently running.

- Divisional Public School, Bahawalnagar
- Divisional Public School, Chichawatni
- Divisional Public School, Burewala
- Divisional Public School, Dunyapur
- Divisional Public School and College, D.G Khan
- Divisional Public School, Faisalabad
- Divisional Public School, Model Town, Lahore
- Divisional Public School, Township, Lahore
- Divisional Public School, Lalamusa

Divisional Public School and College Tandlianwala

- Divisional Public School and College, Sahiwal
- Divisional Public School and College, Sargodha
- Divisional Public School, Samundri
- Divisional Public School and College, Rawalpindi
- Divisional Public School, Toba Tek Singh
- Quaid-E-Azam Divisional Public School and College
- Divisional Public School, Okara City, District Okara.
- Divisional Public School, Depalpur, District Okara.
- Divisional Public School, Haveli Lakha, District Okara
- Divisional Public School, Renala Khurd, District Okara
- Divisional Public School, Gogera, District Okara
- Divisional Public School, Hujra Shah Muqeem, District Okara

== Notable people ==
- Abid Sher Ali
- Senior Justice Ijaz Ul Ahsan (Justice Supreme Court)
- Zahid Akhtar Zaman (Chief Secretary Punjab)
- Justice Jawad Hassan
- Atif Aslam (Prominent Pakistani Singer)
- Noman Ijaz (Prominent Senior actor)
- Saad Salman
- Sami Khan (Leading Actor)
- Asad Rehman Gilani (Federal Secretary)

== Gallery ==
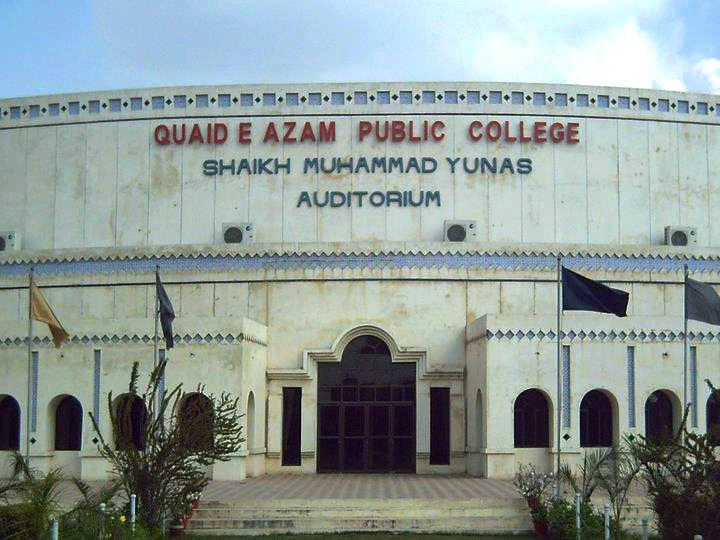
An auditorium at Quaid-E-Azam Divisional Public School and College, Gujranwala.
