= Muhammad Azam Khan =

Muhammad Azam Khan may refer to:

- Azam Khan (general), general of the Pakistan Army
- Muhammad Azam Khan (civil servant), Pakistani civil servant
- Azam Khan (politician), Indian politician and lawyer
- Mohammad Azam Khan, emir of Afghanistan
- Azam Khan (civil servant), officer of the Pakistan Administrative Service
- Muhammad Azam Khan (Pakistani politician)
