= Prime Minister of Pakistan House =

Prime Minister House (Pakistan)

Prime Minister House
- خانه وزیر اعظم
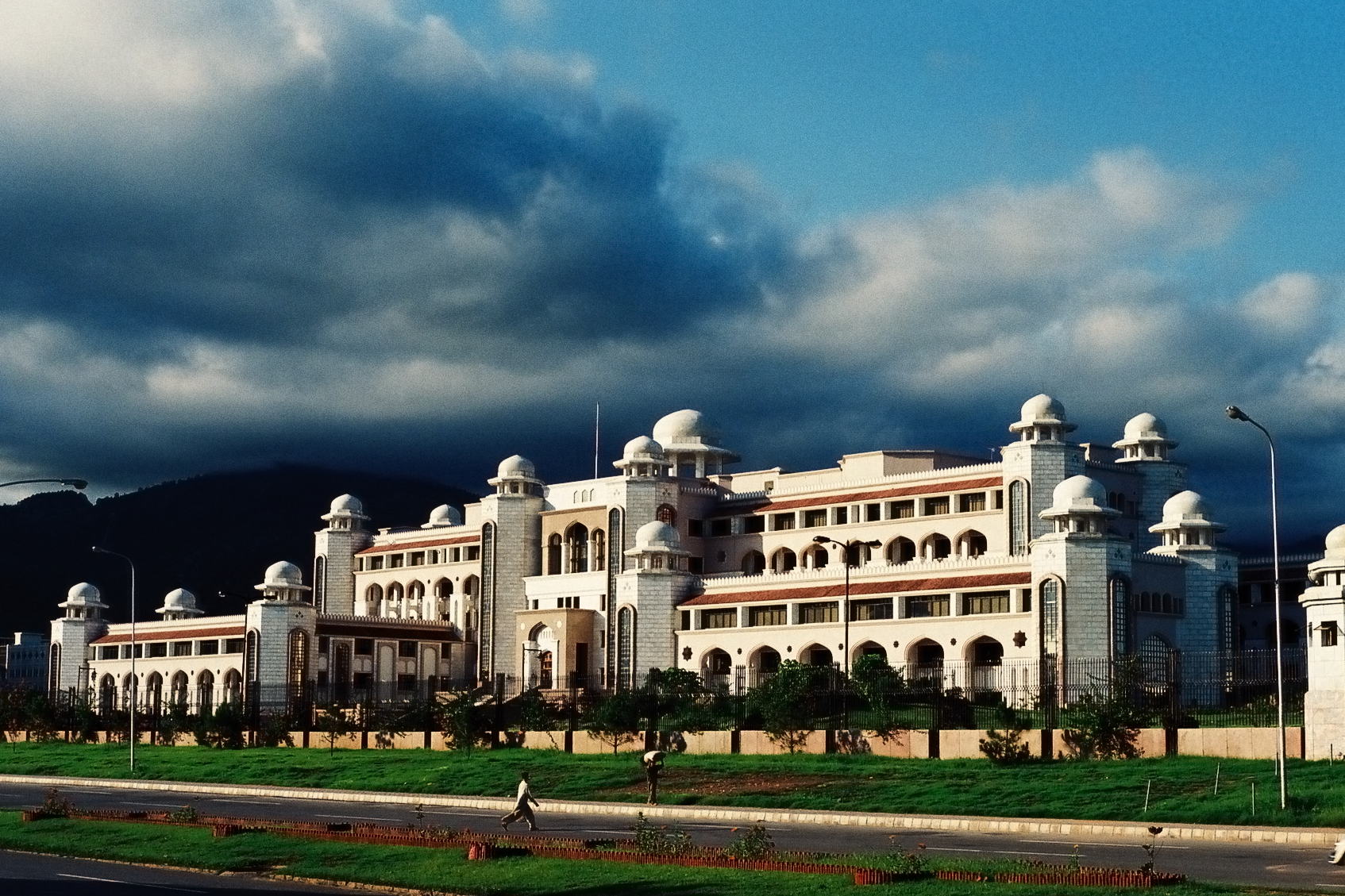

General information
- Location: Constitution Avenue, Red Zone, Islamabad-44010, Pakistan
- Coordinates: 33.7256°N 73.0981°E
- Construction started: 1968
- Renovated: 2017
- Owner: Government of Pakistan

Technical details
- Floor area: 55.6 ha

Other information
- Number of rooms: 100+

Website
- pmo.gov.pk

Prime Minister House is a palace located in Islamabad, Pakistan. It is the official residence of Prime Minister of Pakistan.

== History ==
Prime Minister House was built during the reign of Muhammad Ayub Khan.

In the 1990s, during the second term of Prime Minister Benazir Bhutto, her husband Asif Ali Zardari controversially ordered the development of a polo complex on 46,538 m^{2} (500,930 sq ft) of protected woodland adjacent to the property. The project included a polo field, an exercise track, stables for 40 horses, accommodations for grooms, and a parking area for spectators. When senior official Mohammed Mehdi raised objections to the diversion of $1.3 million from public amenity budgets to fund the project, Zardari reportedly dismissed his concerns and later had Mehdi removed from his position, as stated in an affidavit filed by Mehdi with investigators.

From 1968 to 2018, the palace also served as the Secretariat of the Prime Minister of Pakistan.

In December 2018, it was proposed to convert the residence of the Prime Minister of Pakistan into a research university. In first phase, the Institute of Advanced Studies for the research would be established. However, no progress was made on it, and Imran Khan, the then Prime Minister who announced it was criticized for not fulfilling his promise.

== Buildings ==
=== Prime Minister Office Wing ===
The Prime Minister's office wing, situated within the Prime Minister of Pakistan House, comprises the Prime Minister's office, which includes a designated meeting area for the PM to hold discussions with guests and ministers. The wing features galleries displaying portraits of Liaquat Ali Khan, Pakistan's first Prime Minister, and Muhammad Ali Jinnah, the founding father of Pakistan. The wing also contains the office of the Principal Secretary to the Prime Minister of Pakistan, a waiting room for press meetings, a press media hall, conference rooms, guest rooms, banquet halls, and a cabinet meeting room.

Nawaz Sharif was the first to occupy the Prime Minister's office in the early 1990s, followed by Benazir Bhutto. After the removal of Nawaz Sharif's government by Pervaiz Musharraf, the office was used as Musharraf's camp house, although he primarily resided at the GHQ. The office was subsequently used by Zafarullah Khan Jamali, Shaukat Aziz, Shujaat Hussain, Yousuf Raza Gillani, Raja Pervaiz Ashraf, and Nawaz Sharif. Malik Meraj Khalid and Shahid Khaqan Abbasi, both former Prime Ministers, chose not to reside in the PM House and used only the PM office during their tenures.

==== Banquet for the State Guests ====
The Prime Minister of Pakistan House includes a banquet hall to host state guests. The hall is spacious and can accommodate a large number of people, including media representatives.

==== Cabinet Meeting Room ====
The Cabinet Meeting Room was constructed during the last tenure of former Prime Minister Nawaz Sharif to hold cabinet meetings. The room features gold-plated elements and modern furnishings. It serves as a dedicated space for the prime minister and cabinet members to convene and discuss matters of national importance.

==== Prime Minister's Office ====
The Prime Minister's Office (PMO), also known as the Prime Minister's Secretariat until its renaming by former Prime Minister Nawaz Sharif in 2013, serves as the primary workplace of the Prime Minister of Pakistan. The PMO is headed by the Principal Secretary to the Prime Minister of Pakistan, who oversees the office's operations and manages the Prime Minister's administrative and secretarial tasks.

==== Prime Minister Conference Hall ====
The conference hall was specifically designed to host large gatherings addressed by the prime minister. The hall is spacious and furnished with chandeliers and furniture. It has been the venue for multiple meetings of the National Security Cabinet Council, attended by the Chief of Army Staff (COAS), the Director-General of Inter-Services Intelligence (DG ISI), and other high-ranking military officials.

=== Military Secretary Office ===
The Prime Minister of Pakistan House includes an office for the military secretary. During the tenure of former Prime Minister Nawaz Sharif, this office was used by his daughter, Maryam Nawaz, as a media monitoring cell.

=== Press Auditorium ===
A Press Auditorium is situated in the basement of the Prime Minister of Pakistan House. It is intended for the Prime Minister to address the media, but it has rarely been used for this purpose, as no Prime Minister has held press conferences there to answer media questions. The auditorium is primarily used for press conferences during visits by foreign delegations.

=== Prime Minister Family Wing ===
Prime Minister Family Wing is a five-room residence for the prime minister's family. The residence consists of three bedrooms, including a master bedroom and two additional bedrooms with attached bathrooms, a drawing room, a dining room, a small kitchen, and a small outdoor area for children.

== Facilities ==
The palace consists of 404,685 m^{2} (4,355,990 sq ft) and additional 151,757 m^{2} (1,633,500 sq ft) for Prime Minister's Office and had over 500 servants.

== See also ==
- Prime Minister's Office
