= PSPM =

PSPM may refer to:

- Principal Secretary to the Prime Minister of Pakistan
- Public Security Police Force of Macau
