= Prime Minister's Office (Pakistan) =

Official residence and workplace of the Prime Minister of Pakistan

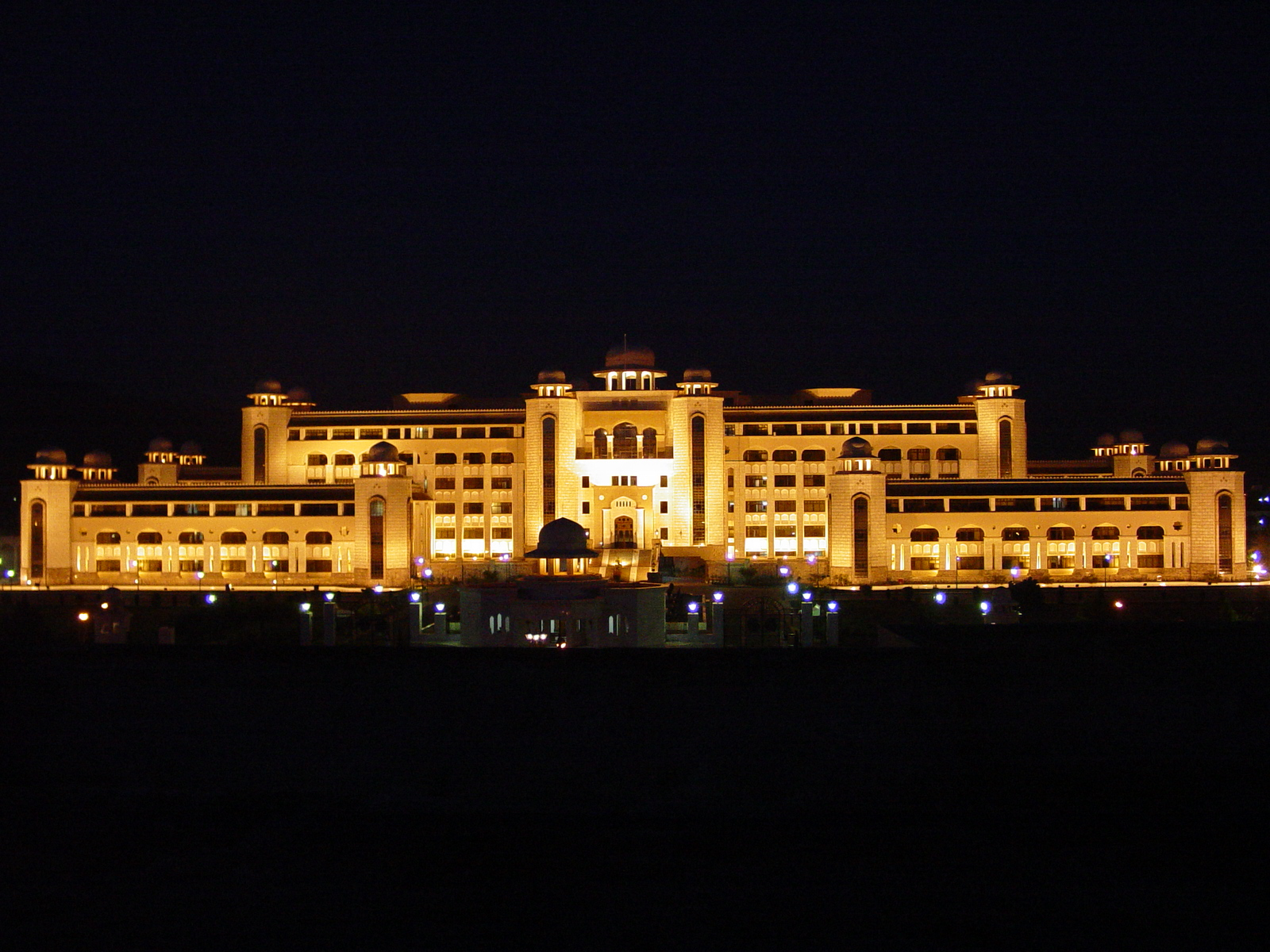
- The Prime Minister Office, principal workplace of the Prime Minister

Agency overview
- Formed: 1947
- Jurisdiction: Islamic Republic of Pakistan
- Headquarters: Constitution Avenue, Red Zone, Islamabad, Pakistan
- Annual budget: ▼ Rs. 1756 million (US$6.3 million) (2025-26)
- Agency executive: Principal Secretary, Asad Rehman Gilani (BPS-22 PAS)
- Website: www.pmo.gov.pk

The Prime Minister's Office (Urdu: دفترِ وزیرِ اعظم) is the principal workplace of the Prime Minister of Pakistan and is headed by the Principal Secretary to the Prime Minister of Pakistan.

It is responsible for formulating policies for the Prime Minister's cabinet, conducting its cabinet meetings, and supervising and overseeing the implementation of the Cabinet's policy.

In addition, it is in charge of other governmental bodies, which report directly to the Prime Minister.

The Prime Minister's Office is located at the Prime Minister’s House in Red Zone, Islamabad, Pakistan.
