= Archaeology of Pakistan =

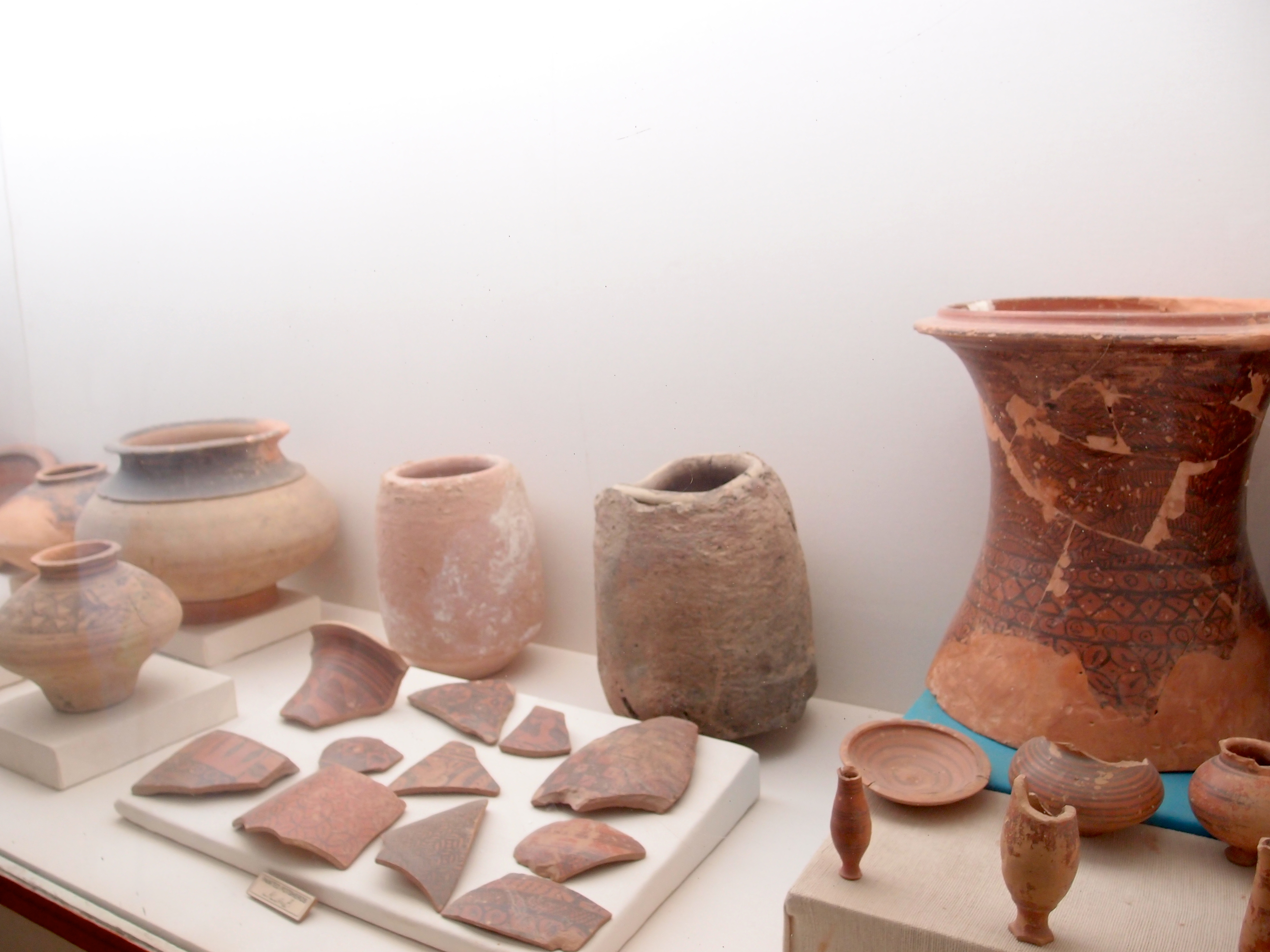
Relics at the museum of Mohenjo-daro

Pakistan contains many of the oldest archaeological discoveries of the world. The country is home to many archaeological sites dating from Lower Paleolithic period to Mughal Empire. The earliest known archaeological findings belong to the Soanian culture from the Soan Valley, near modern-day Islamabad. Soan Valley culture is considered as the best known Palaeolithic culture of Central Asia.

The Mehrgarh culture was amongst the first cultures in the world to establish agriculture and livestock and live in villages. Mehrgarh civilization lasted for 5000 years till 2000 BCE after which people migrated to other areas, possibly Harappa and Mohenjo-daro. Harappa and Mohenjo-daro are the best known sites from the Indus Valley civilization (c 2500 – 1900 BCE). The earliest evidence of civilization in Pakistan can be found on the west banks of the Bolan River and the plains of Kachhi at Mehrgarh. Artifacts found in a 1979 excavation by the Pakistan Archaeology department and a team of French archaeologists can be dated back to 7000 BC. They were able to divide the Mehrgarh culture into three categories:

Mehrgarh Period I- 7000 to 5500 BC, was an aceramic settlement with primitive means of agriculture and livestock. They lived in simple mud buildings and buried their dead with many elaborate goods.

Mehrgarh Period II- 5500 to 4800 BC, was a ceramic settlement that showed strong evidence of having manufacturing activity such as copper and stone drills and more technological kilns. The amount of riches buried with the dead decreased over time.

Mehrgarh Period III- 4800 to 3500 BC, many similarities to Period II.

Mehrgarh Period IV- 2600 to 2000 BC, much of the city was abandoned as the Indus Valley civilization was being born and its inhabitants migrated there.

Twenty miles north of Islamabad the ancient city of Taxila can be found. Taxila, also known as the city of stones, thrived between the years of 518 BC and 600 AD, and in its prime was one of the most flourishing civilizations between the Indus and Jhelum rivers. Alexander the Great led troops through Taxila in 326 BC and he claimed it as part of his vast kingdom until it was conquered by the Mauryan Empire in 300 BC. After the fall of the Mauryan Empire, Taxila was taken back by followers of Alexander in 190 BC. Taxila owed much of its success to the fact that it was located at the intersection of the three major trade routes of India and Central and Western Asia.

Archaeology in Pakistan is conducted under the direction of Department of Archaeology and Museums (DOAM) of Ministry of Heritage and National Integration of Pakistan.

== Bibliography ==
- Zahir, Muhammad; Gandhara Grave Culture and Pakistani Archaeologists: The Pitfalls and Challenges of Traditional Archaeology; Puratatva, Journal of the Indian archeological society, 2020 (Number 50)
