= Principal Secretary =

The Principal Secretary is a senior government official in various Commonwealth countries.

- Principal Secretary (Canada)
- Principal Secretary (India)
  - Principal Secretary to the Prime Minister of India
- Principal Secretary to the Prime Minister of Bangladesh
- Principal Secretary to the President of Pakistan
- Principal Secretary to the Prime Minister of Pakistan
- Principal Secretary to Chief Minister (Pakistan)

== See also ==
- Chief of staff
- Chief of Staff to the Prime Minister (disambiguation)
- Chief Secretary (disambiguation)
- General secretary
- Permanent secretary
- Principal Private Secretary
- Provincial secretary
- Principal
- Secretary
