= National Heritage and Culture Division (Pakistan) =

Division of the Government of Pakistan

- قومی ورثہ و ثقافت ڈویژن

Agency overview
- Type: Responsible for promotion of culture, art, musics, film, theatre, archaeology and museums
- Minister responsible: Aurangzeb Khan Khichi, Federal Minister for National Heritage & Culture
- Agency executive: Asad Rehman Gilani, Federal Secretary
- Website: Official website

The National Heritage and Culture Division is responsible for the promotion of various facets of culture, including architecture, cinema (films), dance, folklore, literature (Mushaira), music, philosophy, textiles, and theatre. It oversees the implementation and enforcement of cultural policies and activities throughout the country. While many of its functions have been devolved to provincial governments in Pakistan, several institutes continue to operate under its federal oversight.

== Departments ==
=== Quaid-i-Azam Academy ===
The Quaid-i-Azam Academy is an institution of the Pakistan Government to promote the study and understanding of the personality and work of Quaid-i-Azam Muhammad Ali Jinnah, his associates, the Pakistan Movement and of the various aspects of Pakistan.

=== National Language Promotion Department ===
==== Urdu Science Board ====
Urdu Science Board (USB) was established in 1962 as the “Central Board for the Development of Urdu” through a resolution. The Board was renamed as “Urdu Science Board” in 1984.

The Board has published more than 800 books on different science subjects, dictionaries and educational charts. Urdu Science Board has developed Urdu Science Encyclopedia consisting ten volumes. It has been printed on fine art mate paper and contains colour pictures, diagrams and visuals. It is very useful for the students of secondary and higher secondary classes, teachers and researchers as well as general readers. A quarterly “Urdu Science Magazine” is being published regularly by Urdu Science Board since 2002.

==== Urdu Dictionary Board ====
Urdu Dictionary Board was established in 1958. It was created through a resolution which stated that Urdu Development Board would compile and publish a comprehensive dictionary of Urdu on historical principles, on the pattern of Greater Oxford Dictionary. The Board was also asked to undertake a number of other tasks for the development of Urdu.

Founded by Baba-e-Urdu Maulvi Abdul Haq who was first Chief Editor of the organization.

== Autonomous/semi-autonomous bodies ==
=== National Council of Arts ===
PNCA is an autonomous body in the orbit of the Ministry. It was created by an Act of Parliament in 1973. PNCA is the Apex Cultural body functioning on a national level. The activities of PNCA are performed on the basis of policies framed by its Board of Governors headed by the Minister for National Heritage & Integration with 28 members.

=== National Institute of Folk & Traditional Heritage ===
Lok Virsa (The National Institute of Folk & Traditional Heritage) works towards creating an awareness of cultural legacy by collecting, documenting, disseminating and projecting folk & traditional heritage. Surveys and documentation of traditional culture is central to the objectives of the institute.

=== Pakistan Academy of Letters ===
Pakistan Academy of Letters was established as an autonomous organization in July, 1976. Its main focus on Pakistani literature and related fields.[1][2] It is the largest and the most prestigious learned society of its kind in Pakistan, with activities throughout the nation.

=== Iqbal Academy Pakistan ===
Iqbal Academy Pakistan is a statutory body of the Government of Pakistan, established and a centre of excellence for Iqbal Studies. The aims and objectives of the Academy are to promote and disseminate the study and understanding of the works and teachings of Allama Iqbal.

=== Quaid-e-Azam Mazar Management Board ===
Quaid-e-Azam Mazar Management Board is responsible for the upkeep and maintenance of Quaid's Mazar and take decisions for Quaid's Mausoleum.

=== Aiwan-i-Iqbal Complex Lahore ===
Aiwan-e-Iqbal Complex is a monumental building constructed in Lahore to portray a semblance of Iqbal`s philosophical thought and message for Muslim Ummah by providing sustained financial resources for the Activating and the Projects of the Iqbal Academy Pakistan.

== See also ==
- Culture of Pakistan
