= Philatelic Federation of Pakistan =

Philatelic Federation of Pakistan is the governing body of philately in Pakistan. It is a member of Fédération Internationale de Philatélie (FIP) and Federation of Inter-Asian Philately (F.I.A.P.).

== Executive Board ==
The current president (2024–2025) is Mr. Sultan Mahmud from Islamabad and Mr. Rizwam Kodwavwala (General Secretary) from Karachi .

=== Past Presidents ===
- Salman Qureshi
- Usman Ali Isani
- Khalid Malik
- Iqbal H.Nanjee
