= Chief of Staff to the Prime Minister =

Chief of Staff to the Prime Minister may refer to:

- Chief of Staff to the Prime Minister (Australia)
- Chief of Staff to the Prime Minister (Canada)
- Chief of Staff to the Prime Minister (Latvia)
- Chief of Staff to the Prime Minister (Malta)
- Downing Street Chief of Staff, in the United Kingdom

== See also ==
- Chief of staff
- Chief Secretary (disambiguation)
- Principal Secretary (disambiguation)
