= Chairman of the Joint Chiefs of Staff (disambiguation) =

Chairman of the Joint Chiefs of Staff may refer to the most senior military officer in several countries:

- Chairman of the Joint Chiefs of Staff (United States)
- Chairman of the Joint Chiefs of Staff (Jordan)
- Chairman of the Joint Chiefs of Staff (South Korea)
- Chairman Joint Chiefs of Staff Committee (Pakistan)

== See also ==
- Chief of staff
- Joint Chiefs of Staff (disambiguation)
