= Azam Khan (civil servant) =

Pakistani bureaucrat

26th Principal Secretary to the Prime Minister of Pakistan
- In office 18 August 2018 – 10 April 2022
- President: Arif Alvi
- Prime Minister: Imran Khan

Chief Secretary Khyber Pakhtunkhwa
- In office 15 September 2017 – 13 June 2018
- Chief Minister: Parvez Khattak

Personal details
- Born: Mardan, Khyber Pakhtunkhwa, Pakistan
- Education: Master's
- Alma mater: Quaid-i-Azam University

Muhammad Azam Khan is a retired Grade 22 officer of the Pakistan Administrative Service. He has previously served as Principal Secretary to the Prime Minister of Pakistan in Imran Khan's government. Prior to his stint in the federal government, he served as Chief Secretary Khyber Pakhtunkhwa. He was nominated as the Executive Director World Bank in February, 2022, however his notification was cancelled by the PML-N federal government in August,2022.

== Early life and education ==
He was born into a Pashtun family of the Yusufzai tribe in a village near Mardan, Pakistan. He received his early education from Army Burn Hall College and later earned his Master's in international relations from Quaid-e-Azam University.

He was initially posted as District Management Group (DMG) after he secured first rank in Central Superior Services in 1991.

He married the daughter of Col (R) Nawabzada Amir Khan Hoti (1919–2005), former member of the National Assembly affiliated with the PPP and part of the influential Hoti clan.

== Career ==
He belongs to the 1990 batch of Central Superior Services. He served at various positions throughout his career such as assistant commissioner for Chunian and Taxila, and was later appointed as deputy commissioner for Peshawar in 1999 Pakistani coup d'état and additional chief secretary for Federally Administered Tribal Areas. He was also appointed as secretary for sports, tourism, and youth affairs, and home, in addition to secretary for tribal affairs. In 2018, he was appointed as principal secretary to the prime minister's office with grade 21, although Pakistan's federal bureaucracy position requires grade 22.

Since a principal secretary to the prime minister of Pakistan is usually appointed from one of the administrative officers with grade 22, Azam Khan was appointed by Imran Khan with grade 21. He is often criticised by civil servants, citing his inadequate experience in federal government office.

In 2019, he allegedly added his own name in grade 22 promotion list prepared or proposed by the High Powered Selection Board (HPSB) headed by prime minister with other board members, including principal secretary Azam Khan himself.

In October 2018, the National Accountability Bureau (NAB) charged him for his alleged role in signing a 33-year lease deal, comprising 275 kanals in Malam Jabba. However, the anti-corruption agency, NAB dropped the charges against him and other PTI officials, including Mahmood Khan and Pervez Khattak in 2021 after a special committee formed by the Peshawar High Court recommended the agency to close the case.
