= Joint Chiefs of Staff (disambiguation) =

Joint Chiefs of Staff may refer to:

- Joint Chiefs of Staff of the United States
- Joint Chiefs of Staff (Saudi Arabia)
- Joint Chiefs of Staff (South Korea)
- Joint Chiefs of Staff (Iran)
- Board of Joint Chiefs of Staff, Spain
- Joint Chiefs of Staff Committee, Pakistan
- Joint Staff Office, Japan
- Joint Chiefs of Staff of the Armed Forces, Brazil

== See also ==
- Chief of staff
- Chairman of the Joint Chiefs of Staff (disambiguation)
- Chief of the Defence Staff (disambiguation)
