= Usman Ali Isani =

Pakistani academic

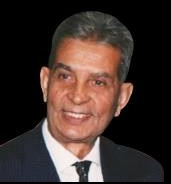

Principal Secretary to the Prime Minister of Pakistan
- Preceded by: Anwar Zahid
- Succeeded by: Salim Abbas Jilani

Personal details
- Born: 1934 (age 91–92) Shikarpur District, British India
- Education: University of the Punjab, University of California
- Profession: Bureaucrat, Philatelist

Usman Ali Isani is a former senior Pakistani bureaucrat, educationist and a philatelist.

== Overview ==
Usman Ali Isani was born in 1934 to a Sindhi family in the village Bado of Shikarpur District. He is an alumnus of the Prince of Wales Royal Military College Dheradhoon. After the Indo-Pak division, he joined Lawrence College and was the first Sindhi to receive Sword of Honour of the 13th PMA Long course. At the rank of Captain, he was inducted in the Civil Services of Pakistan in 1960, at the rank of an Assistant Commissioner. Isani served at the high-profile positions of Principal Secretary to the Prime Minister of Pakistan (PSPM) Muhammad Khan Junejo in the 1980s and also to PM Benazir Bhutto in her first government, Secretary General Establishment Division and Chief Secretary Khyber Pakhtunkhwa. After retirement from civil services, he served as Vice Chancellor for Iqra University. and Vice Chancellor of Quaid-e-Azam University.

== Education and family ==
Usman Ali Isani started his schooling from Deradhoon College before migrating to Pakistan and later received his earlier education from Lawrence College, Murree. He has a master's degree in History from Punjab University and a master's degree in education from University of California, Berkeley. He was awarded the Sword of Honour (Pakistan), awarded to the best graduating cadet in their class, in 1956 at the Pakistan Military Academy. Usman Ali Isani is the brother of Dr. Muzaffar Ali Isani.

Isani initially joined the Pakistan Army. However, he opted to join the Civil Services of Pakistan later on. Isani served as the Principal Secretary to the Prime Minister of Pakistan, Chief Secretary Khyber Pakhtunkhwa as well as Health Secretary of Pakistan and Secretary Railways. Isani also served as the head of the prestigious Establishment Division as secretary general. In addition, Isani served in the Government of Sindh as the provincial Education Secretary. During his long career, he has also served as the chairman, Higher Education Commission (Pakistan) formerly known as University Grants Commission. He also remained, Secretary to Governor West Pakistan at Lahore. He is 1st Sindhi sword of Honour from 13th Pakistan Military Academy Long course. Army Captain in Artillery corps and then transferred in CSP cadre in 1960 as Assistant commissioner. He is also co-author of the book Dynamics of Higher Education in Pakistan.

== Philatelist ==
Isani is one of Pakistan's leading philatelist having won medals for both his traditional and literature exhibits at world exhibitions. He is also a former President of the Philatelic Federation of Pakistan as well as the country's representative on the FIP Commission for Philatelic Literature. Usman Ali Isani is an active member of Philatelic Federation of Pakistan.

== Publications ==
- Women's Access to Higher Education in Pakistan: A Case Study of Access of Women to Higher Education in Pakistan. Saarbrücken: LAP Lambert Academic Publishing, 28 April 2010
- Problems of Higher Education; paper prepared by Captain Usman Ali Isani and Dr. Latif Virk for the Task Force on Improvement of Higher Education in Pakistan, 2001.
- Pakistan: Overprints on Indian Stamps and Postal Stationery, 1947-1949 by Usman Ali Isani and Ron Doubleday, 1993)
- The Emirate of Bahawalpur, Postal History and Stamps (1932–1949) by Dr. Usman Ali Isani and Syed Abid Hussain. Karachi: Post Office Foundation Press. 2006.
