= Aminullah Chaudhry =

Pakistani bureaucrat (1944-2013

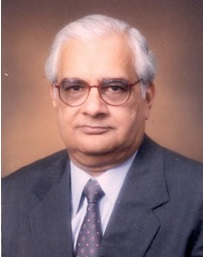
Aminullah Chaudhry, Former DG Civil Aviation Authority (CAA), Pakistan

Aminullah Chaudhry (Urdu: امین اللہ چوہدری; 24 February 1944 - 1 June 2013), was a senior Pakistani bureaucrat and remained Principal Secretary to Prime Minister (PSPM) of Pakistan Malik Meraj Khalid and Director General (DG), Civil Aviation Authority (CAA), Pakistan.

== Early life and education ==
He took his earlier education in two missionary schools; namely St.Anthonys and St.Placid in Lahore and Chittagong, respectively. He then moved on to Government College (GC), Lahore for higher education and got his name marked on the Academic Roll of Honor. Prior to Government College, he did his 'A' levels from Aitchison College in Lahore. He held an honours degree in physics from Punjab University and LLB from PULC and an LL.M in corporate law from the London School of Economics (LSE), UK.

== Career as civil servant ==
Aminullah joined Civil Service of Pakistan (CSP) in 1967 and held wide spectrum of secretarial and field appointments.

He remained Commissioner Faisalabad and Commissioner Lahore division (Punjab Govt.). On secretarial positions, he served as Secretary Finance (Punjab Govt.) Secretary local government and rural development (Punjab Govt.), Secretary Education (Punjab Govt), Director General (DG) Lahore Development Authority (LDA). He also remained Secretary to Prime Minister during 1996–97 in caretaker government. His last appointment was Director General (DG), Civil Aviation Authority (CAA) with Additional charge of the Aviation Division in the Ministry of Defense (MoD), Govt. of Pakistan. He was an avid golfer and won the Amateur Golf Championship of Punjab in 1976.

Aminullah was batchmate of senior bureaucrats; Shahid Hamid, Saeed Mehdi and Afzal Kahut.

== Plane Hi-jacking controversy ==
Aminullah was the in charge of civil aviation Pakistan whilst serving as Director General (DG), Civil Aviation Authority (CAA) in Karachi on 12 Oct 1999, and allegedly upon his instructions the return flight of then Chief of Army Staff, General Pervaiz Musharraf' from Colombo to Karachi, was not allowed to land in Karachi. After the coup d'état of General Pervaiz Musharraf, Aminullah was immediately sacked from his position and was arrested and put in solitary confinement. Aminullah, along with the Prime Minister Sharif and other senior officials had to face plane hi-jacking case by military government in a Pakistani trial court. Later, he gave testimony, that he had received Sharif's orders to waylay the Musharrafs plane and got acquitted from the case by becoming a state witness and approver.

== Literary work ==
He authored two books post retirement from government service.

- Chaudry, Aminullah (2010). Musharraf, Nawaz & Hijacking from the Ground. Lahore: Vanguard Books. ISBN 978-969-402-541-4.
- Chaudry, Aminullah (2011). Political administrators: the story of the Civil Service of Pakistan (1. publ ed.). Oxford: Oxford University Press. ISBN 978-0-19-906171-6.

== Death ==
Aminullah Chaudry died on 1 June 2013, in Lahore, Pakistan.
