= Loyal opposition =

Democratic concept

In parliamentary systems of government, the loyal opposition is the opposition parties in the legislature. The word loyal indicates that the non-governing parties may oppose the actions of the sitting cabinet while remaining loyal to the formal source(s) of the government's power, such as the monarch or constitution. This loyalty allows for a peaceful transition of power and ongoing strengthening of democratic institutions. The idea of inquisitorial opposition that held the executive to account emerged in the United Kingdom.

== Concept ==
The phrase is derived from John Hobhouse stating His Majesty's Loyal Opposition in 1826 in a debate in the British parliament. It is intended to illustrate that Members of Parliament in a country's legislature may oppose the policies of the incumbent government—typically comprising parliamentarians from the party with the most seats in the elected legislative chamber—while maintaining deference to the higher authority of the state and the larger framework within which democracy operates. The concept thus permits the dissent necessary for a functioning democracy without fear of being accused of treason.

As Michael Ignatieff, a former leader of the loyal opposition in the House of Commons of Canada, said in a 2012 address at Stanford University:

"The opposition performs an adversarial function critical to democracy itself… Governments have no right to question the loyalty of those who oppose them. Adversaries remain citizens of the same state, common subjects of the same sovereign, servants of the same law."

== Commonwealth realms ==
The notion of a loyal opposition exists in various Commonwealth realms, being therein termed formally as His (or Her) Majesty's Loyal Opposition and informally as the Official Opposition, with the head of the largest opposition party—normally that which holds the second largest number of seats—designated as the Leader of Her (or His) Majesty's Loyal Opposition. This tradition emerged in the oldest of the Commonwealth realms—the United Kingdom—during the 18th century.

As a consequence of this parliamentary evolution, the sovereign's right to the throne became more concrete, seeing the opposition scrutinise government legislation and policies, rather than engage in disputes between competing candidates for the Crown, each supported by different religious and economic groups. Further, the acceptance of such a thing as a loyal opposition in Parliament factored into the development of a rigid party system in the United Kingdom; the separation of Members of Parliament's loyalty to the Crown from their opposition to the sovereign's ministers eliminated the idea that there could only be one "King's Party" and that to oppose it would be disloyal or even treasonous.

The concept of a loyal parliamentary opposition came to be rooted in the other countries due to their being former British colonies, to which British parliamentary institutions were transported. Thus, the phrase His Majesty's Loyal Opposition existed in some Commonwealth realms even before the title of prime minister. Also, in federal countries, such as Canada and Australia, the phrase His Majesty's Loyal Opposition is also employed in provincial or state legislatures, in the same fashion as in other parliaments.

== See also ==
- Controlled opposition
- Opposition (politics)
- His Majesty's Government (term)
