= His Majesty's Government (term) =

Formal term referring to the government of a Commonwealth realm

The phrase His Majesty's Government (or Her Majesty's Government during the reign of a female monarch) is a formal term referring to the government of a Commonwealth realm or one of its constituent provinces, states or territories. In use since at least the height of the British Empire, the phrase has been inherited and integrated into the countries that emerged from that polity and which remain Commonwealth realms.

Where Commonwealth countries have transitioned away from monarchical government (e.g. Malta) the term is entirely redundant, excepting historical usage.

== Geographical history ==
In the British Empire, the term His (or Her) Majesty's Government was originally only used in reference to the Imperial government in London. As the Empire developed, and responsible government was granted to more provinces and entities within the Empire, some disambiguation of the term became necessary. In particular, the rise of Dominion status for various Imperial entities demanded phrasing that would reflect differences in The Crown’s operation in different domains. It came to be described as "the Crown in right of Canada", for example.

Alongside this evolving constitutional picture, the practical interests of the various different entities within the Empire were sometimes out of alignment, and it became necessary to particularise the actions of specific entities through their executives. For instance, at the time of the 1893 Bering Sea dispute between Canada and the United States, the interests of Canada and the United Kingdom were opposed but the United Kingdom government handled Canadian foreign relations. The need became obvious with the Statute of Westminster 1931, which effectively made the Dominions equal constituent countries with the United Kingdom in the imperial project, and unavoidable with the transition of the Empire into the Commonwealth of Nations.

Accordingly the form His Majesty's Government in… began to be used by the United Kingdom and Dominion governments, from the 1920s and 1930s onward, to differentiate between independent entities, such as His Majesty's Government in the Irish Free State. Colonial, state, and provincial governments, on the other hand, continued to use the lesser title Government of [region/territory], and eventually the phrase used in the former Dominions altered to mirror that of the UK, becoming, for example, His Majesty's Australian Government.

== Constitutional history and comparative terms ==
The term is employed in order to signify that the government of a Commonwealth realm or, less commonly, a division thereof (for instance the Canadian Province of Alberta), belongs to the reigning sovereign, and not to the cabinet or prime minister.

Notwithstanding that it is (in at least a technical sense) constitutionally incorrect, across the Commonwealth realms individual governments are frequently referred to informally by the person serving as the relevant Prime Minister, rather than in reference to the Monarch. For example, during Margaret Thatcher's time in office from 1979 to 1990, the Government of the United Kingdom was frequently known as the Thatcher Government. This style of referring to the government after its most important member is frequent across the Commonwealth, for example the Harper Government in Canada from 2006 to 2015 when Stephen Harper served as Prime Minister, or the Manley Government in Jamaica. It is, however, more constitutionally accurate to refer to such premierships as 'Ministries', for instance the Cameron Ministries where David Cameron was British Prime Minister from 2010 to 2016.

This convention of naming the Government after its most prominent members is comparatively modern. This is because until at least the reign of George III of the United Kingdom it was a Royal Prerogative that the Monarch held absolute discretion to choose their own ministers, such that the government was not really the Prime Minister's (or otherwise) at all. Indeed, during the reign of Queen Anne (just before the development of the office of Prime Minister) her fondness for compromise and consensus frequently led to governments composed by persons who disliked each other and did not integrate. In such period there was no question that the Government was anything other than that of the Monarch.

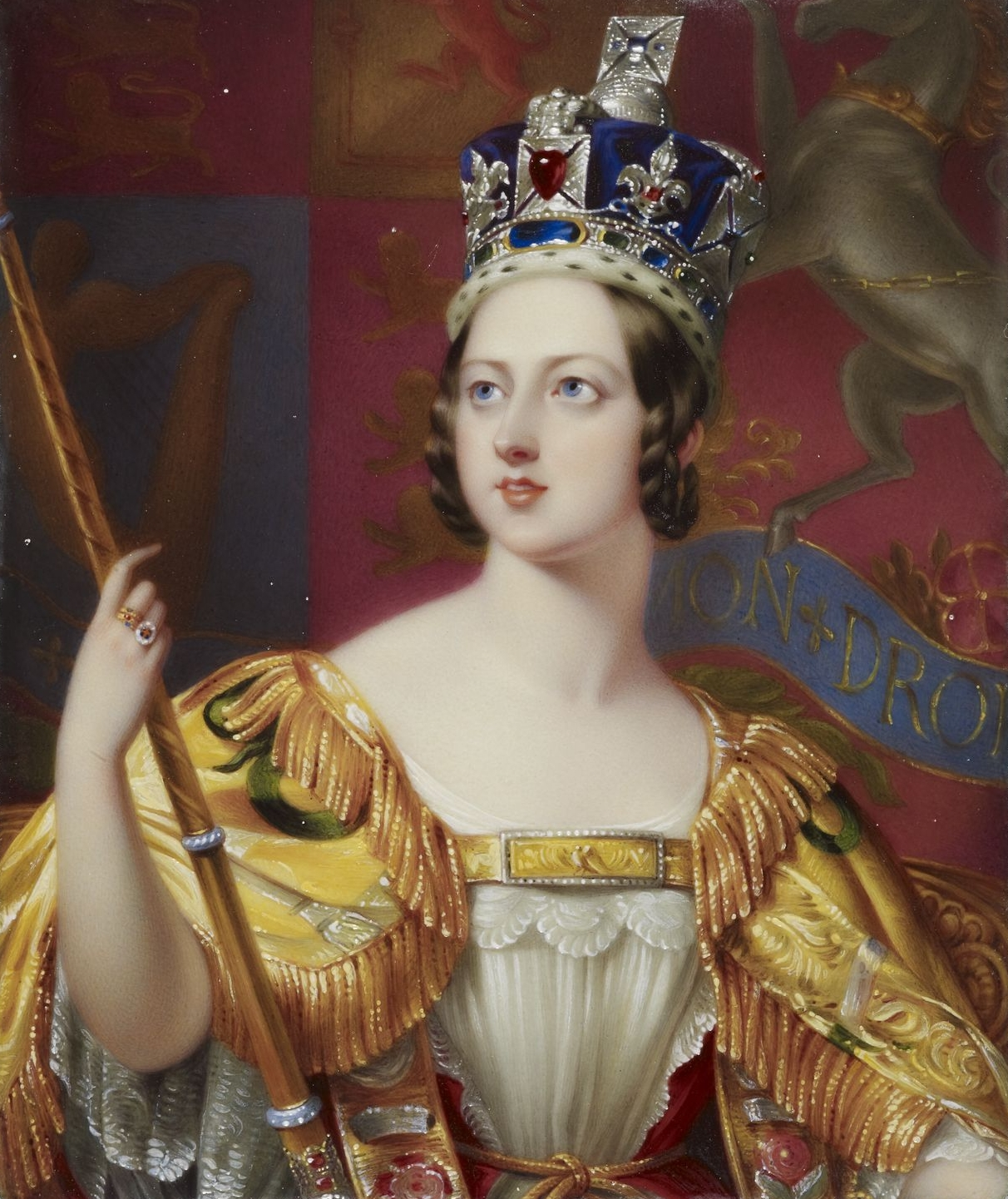
Victoria was the last monarch who routinely shaped the composition of her government.

The evolution of the British constitution and reduction in the powers of the Crown gradually reduced the centrality of the monarch in de facto government. Queen Victoria was the last monarch truly to attempt to choose the personnel of her government; for instance her hatred of William Gladstone helped Lord Salisbury to retain office. Even at the time her actions were considered to be somewhat constitutionally improper. Although individual ministers (in Britain at least) below the rank of Prime Minister are still formally appointed by the Monarch, from the early twentieth century the head of state has in practice had no discretion to choose individual members of the government, except (occasionally) the Prime Minister. In the latter case this was only due to hung parliamentary arrangements, and (until the monarch's role was abolished in the 1960s) an unclear choice for leader of the Conservative Party. Indeed, where the monarch has had discretion to choose a Prime Minister in such circumstances it has resulted in some controversy: for instance, George V's role in facilitating the formation of the National Government of the United Kingdom in 1931 because Ramsay MacDonald operated a minority government was not without controversy, whilst in Australia Sir John Kerr's (acting in loco regis as Governor-General) discretion in dismissing ministers led to a constitutional crisis.

Thus, as the importance of the monarch in governance has declined, the term His/Her Majesty's Government has increased in formality and reduced in daily usage. As a corollary, the rise in power of the office of Prime Minister away from its historical position as primus inter pares (first amongst equals) of cabinet ministers in His/Her Majesty's Government into the driving force of a modern administration has led to governments named after them, and the two naming conventions serve different functions. For example, the reduction in the visibility of the monarch in government has made it an unhelpful description politically. If one were to critique the rail privatisation policy of the British Government during 1996 (for instance) it might not be considered helpful to use the phrase "Her Majesty's Government", since then-Queen Elizabeth II had no role in formulating the policy; instead the term "Major Government" is arguably more helpful, since the policy was driven by Prime Minister John Major.

== See also ==
- Loyal opposition
