= Secretary (2006 film) =

- Directed by: Kate Dennis
- Starring: Maeve Dermody
- Country of origin: Australia
- Original language: English

Production
- Producer: Amanda Higgs

Original release
- Release: 2006

Secretary is a 2006 Australian television film. It was the pilot for a television series which had never produced.

== Premise ==
A look at four secretaries and a receptionist at a law firm.

== Cast ==
- Pia Miranda as Nadia Baranova
- Maeve Dermody as Morgan Wells
- Kimberley Davies as Annabel
- Jessica McNamee as Lucy Tuckett
- Ming-Zhu Hii as Tamara Streeter
- Vince Colosimo as Justin Gallagher
- David Hoflin as Dick McKew
- Peter O'Brien as Shane Cox
- Susie Porter as Aviva Bloch
- Dave Roberts as Ken Kehoe

== Production ==
Southern Star Entertainment made the pilot for Channel Ten. It was from the same producer as The Secret Life of Us. Filming began in June 2006 in Melbourne.

Channel Ten passed on the series in September 2006. Network programmer David Mott said at the time the show had not "come up to a standard we were comfortable with". A copy of the pilot episode was uploaded to the internet for a time.
