= Chief Secretary =

Chief Secretary may refer to:

== Current posts ==
- Chief Secretary (India), a senior civil servant in the states and union territories of India
- Chief Secretary (Pakistan), the highest-ranking civil servant in the provinces and administrative units of Pakistan, including:
  - Chief Secretary Balochistan
  - Chief Secretary Khyber Pakhtunkhwa
  - Chief Secretary Punjab
  - Chief Secretary Sindh
- Chief Secretary (Sri Lanka), a senior civil servant in the provinces of Sri Lanka
- Chief Secretary for Administration, the head of the Government Secretariat of Hong Kong
- Chief Secretary of the Isle of Man, the head of the Isle of Man Civil Service
- Chief Secretary of Tobago, the leader of the Tobagonian government
- Chief Secretary to the Government, the most senior officer in the Malaysian Civil Service
- Chief Secretary to the Prime Minister, a senior officer in the Cabinet Office
- Chief Secretary to the Treasury, a senior minister in the Cabinet of the United Kingdom
- Chief Secretary of Asanteman, the title of the administrative officer of the Ashanti traditional kingdom in Ghana, held by the father of Joe Appiah

== Defunct posts ==
- Chief Secretary (British Empire), civil-servant title in colonies of the British Empire
- Chief Secretary, Singapore, a high-ranking government civil position in colonial Singapore
- Chief Secretary of New South Wales, an office in the colonial and state administration in New South Wales
- Chief Secretary of Victoria, an office in the colonial and state administration in Victoria
- Chief Secretary of South Australia, an office in the colonial and state administration in South Australia
- Chief Secretary, second name for the former Colonial Secretary of Western Australia
- Chief Secretary for Ireland, an office in the British administration in Ireland

== See also ==
- Secretary (disambiguation)
  - Secretary (title)
- Chief Cabinet Secretary, Japan
- Chief of staff
- Chief of Staff to the Prime Minister (disambiguation)
- Permanent secretary, a senior civil servant position
  - Permanent secretary (UK)
- Private secretary, a civil servant
- Provincial secretary, Canada
- Principal Secretary (disambiguation)
