= Principal Secretary to Chief Minister =

Civil service position in the government of Sindh, Pakistan

In the Pakistani Province of Sindh, the CM (Chief Minister) Secretariat is headed by the Principal Secretary to the Chief Minister (PSCM).

The PSCM advises and assists the Chief Minister on all the official business routed through the CM Office, and because of this the PSCM is the most crucial aide to the Chief Minister. The current PSCM is Sajid Jamal Abro, an Officer of the Secretariat Service and a BPS-20 since August 2018.

The PSCM is either a BPS-21 grade or BPS-20 Grade official.

Being the administrative head of the Chief Minister's Office, the PSCM wields power over the daily affairs of the Government of Sindh. The duties of the PSCM include:

- advising the Chief Minister and Chief Secretary on provincial policy and its implementation,
- dealing with official paperwork in the Chief Minister's Office,
- placing before the Chief Minister critical files for approval such as Summaries and transfers of Officials,
- coordinating activities in the Chief Minister's Office, and
- preparing notes on issues to be discussed by the CM with senior politicians, bureaucrats and other dignitaries.
