= First Secretary =

First Secretary may refer to:

- First minister, a leader of a government
- Secretary (title)#First secretary, a leader of a political party (especially Communist parties), trade union, or other organization
- First Secretary (diplomatic rank), a role within an embassy
- First Secretary of State, a ministerial rank in the British government
