= Jawad Hassan =

Pakistani judge

Justice of the Lahore High Court
- Incumbent
- Assumed office 26 November 2016

Personal details
- Born: 28 July 1967 (age 59)

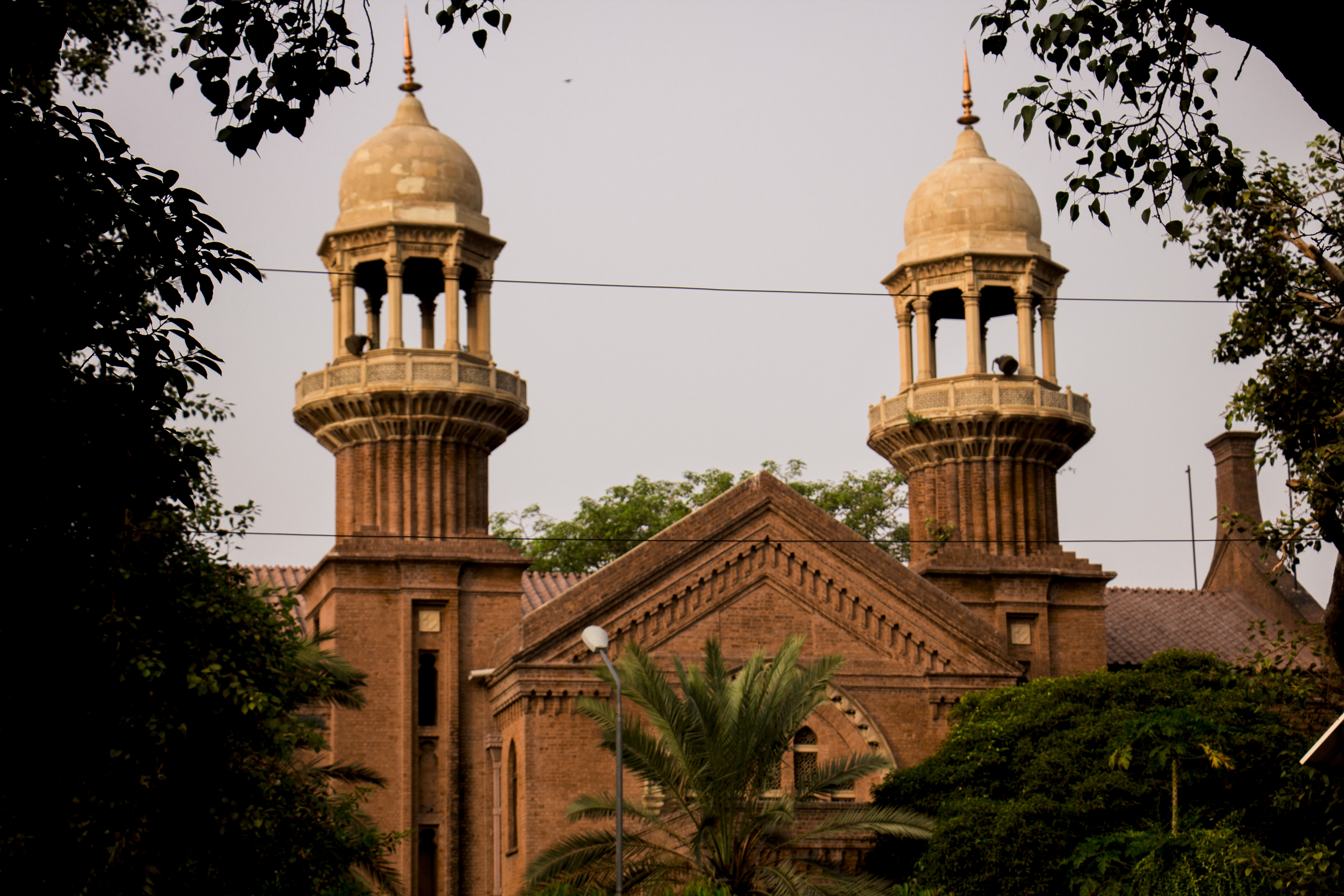
Lahore High Court

Jawad Hassan (born 28 July 1967) is a Pakistani jurist who has been a Justice of the Lahore High Court since 26 November 2016. Earlier, he served in the Advocate General Punjab office as an additional advocate general and represented the Government of Punjab in the Supreme Court of Pakistan and the Lahore High Court.

== Judicial career ==
Hassan was inducted into Lahore High Court as an additional judge on 26 November 2016. He became a permanent judge of the court on 22 October 2018. Before elevation to the bench he was serving as Additional Advocate General Punjab prior to that he remained on the roll of the visiting faculty of various Universities and law Colleges, where taught the Constitution and environment law etc. He also added in green benches of Lahore High Court.

== See also ==
- Lahore High Court
- Lahore High Court Bar Association
- Supreme Court Bar Association of Pakistan
