= Asad Rehman Gilani =

Secretary to National Heritage and Culture
- Incumbent
- Assumed office March 2025

Principal Secretary to Prime Minister
- In office 4 June 2024 – 18 March 2025

Personal details
- Education: Divisional Public School & College
- Alma mater: Harvard Kennedy School (MPA); King Edward Medical University

Asad Rehman Gilani is an officer of the Pakistan Administrative Service (PAS) currently serving as Secretary National Heritage and Culture Divisíon. Gilani previously served as Principal Secretary to the Prime Minister of Pakistan. Gilani belongs to the 24th Common Training Program and is among the very few federal secretaries alongside Sardar Ahmad Nawaz Sukhera and Rizwan Ahmed who are Harvard graduates.

He also previously served as Secretary for the Pakistan Board of Investment (BOI) at the PM Office. He has also previously served as chairman of the National Database and Registration Authority (NADRA) in an acting capacity.
