= Chief of staff =

Administrative leader

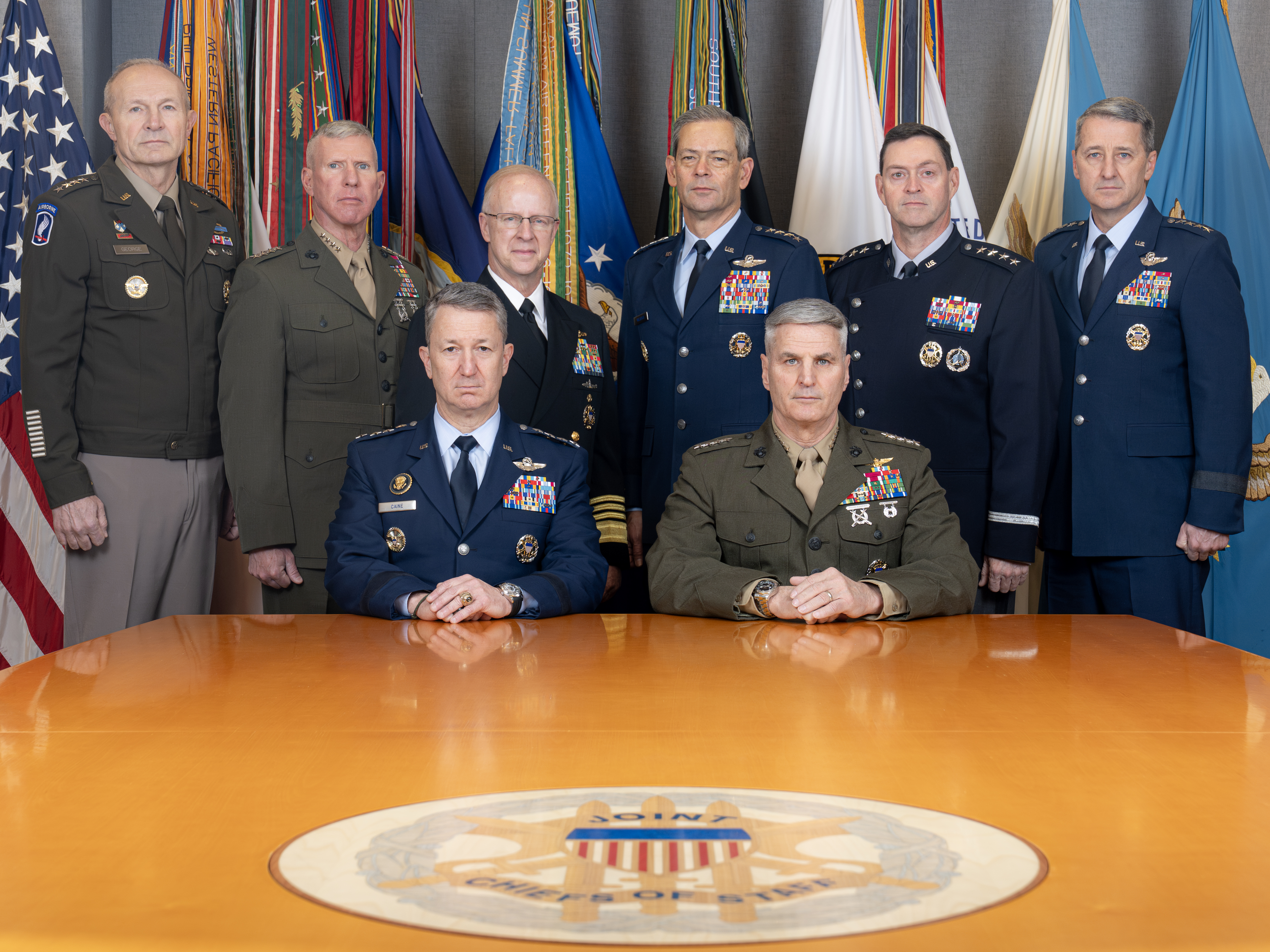
Joint Chiefs of Staff of the U.S. Department of Defense in 2026.

Chief of staff (or head of staff) is a leadership title with different meanings in civilian and military organizations. In civilian government organizations and businesses, a chief of staff is a primary aide-de-camp to an important individual, such as a president or leader of a large organization. In military organizations, a chief of staff is the leader of a complex organization, such as one of a country's armed forces, while the role that coordinates supporting staff for a senior military officer may be titled a principal staff officer (PSO).

== Civilian ==
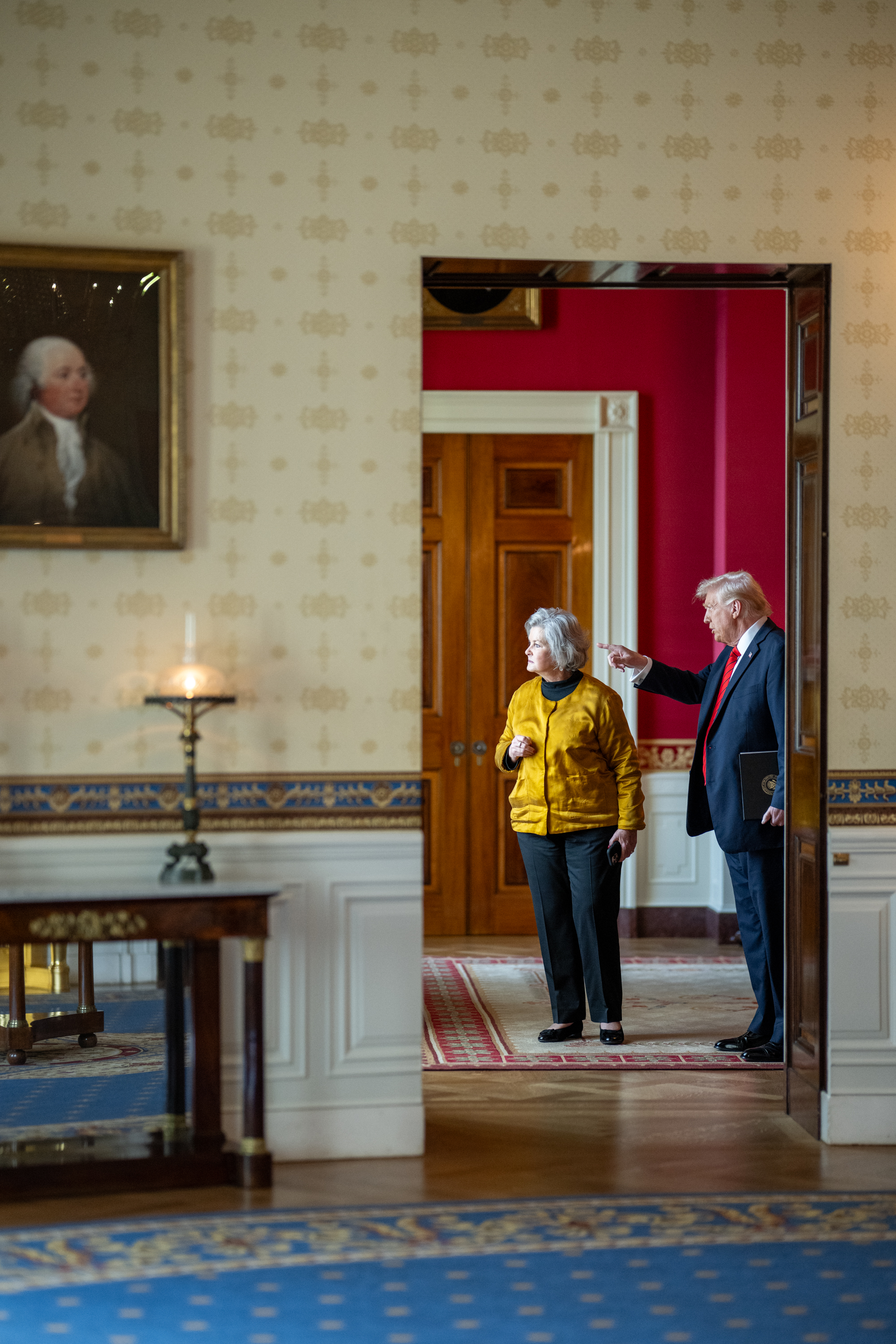
Former White House Chief of Staff, Susie Wiles, with President Donald Trump in 2025

In civilian organizations, a chief of staff provides a buffer between a chief executive and that executive's direct-reporting team. The chief of staff generally works behind the scenes to solve problems, mediate disputes, and deal with issues before they are brought to the chief executive. Often a chief of staff acts as a confidant and advisor to the chief executive, acting as a sounding board for ideas. Ultimately the actual duties depend on the position and the people involved. In an organization, the chief of staff may play a role that is metaphorically akin to an "air traffic controller" for the leader and the senior team; as an integrator connecting work streams that would otherwise remain siloed; as a communicator linking the leadership team and the broader organization; as an honest broker and truth teller when the leader needs a wide-ranging view; and as a confidant without an organizational agenda. An organization may also hire an associate chief of staff (ACoS), a senior operational role that serves as a partner to the chief of staff (CoS).

=== Government ===
==== Australia ====
- Chief of Staff to the Prime Minister

==== Brazil ====
- Chief of Staff of the Presidency

==== Canada ====
- Chief of Staff to the Prime Minister
- Principal Secretary

==== Colombia ====
- Chief of Staff of the Presidency

==== France ====
In France, a distinction is made between a politician's directeur de cabinet and chef de cabinet. The directeur de cabinet is tasked with organising the work of the staff and is authorised to make certain decisions or speak on behalf of the politician. It is thus the more political role. The chef de cabinet is under the authority of the directeur de cabinet and is tasked with organising the politician's agenda.

At the Élysée, a third function exists: the Secrétaire général de la présidence de la République (Secretary-General of the Presidency of the Republic). The officeholder is the de facto chief of staff to the President of France, above the directeur de cabinet and chef de cabinet. The secretary-general is the president's closest advisor, coordinating with the government and taking part in the weekly Council of Ministers.

==== Germany ====
- Head of the German Chancellery

==== India ====
- Principal Secretary to the Prime Minister of India

==== Nigeria ====
- Chief of Staff to the President

==== Pakistan ====
- Principal Secretary to the President
- Principal Secretary to the Prime Minister

==== Philippines ====
- Chief of Staff (Philippines), a former position in the Cabinet of the Philippines, serving under the President of the Philippines
- Special Assistant to the President

==== South Korea ====
- Chief Presidential Secretary, chief of staff to the President of South Korea

==== Spain ====
- Moncloa Chief of Staff

==== United Kingdom ====
- Private Secretary to the Sovereign
- Downing Street Chief of Staff
- Cabinet Secretary
- Principal Private Secretary to the Prime Minister
- Principal Private Secretary to the Secretary of State for Foreign and Commonwealth Affairs

===== Scotland =====
- Chief of Staff to the First Minister

==== United States ====
- Chief of staff, the most senior staff member in the office of a member of the United States Congress
- White House Chief of Staff

== Military ==
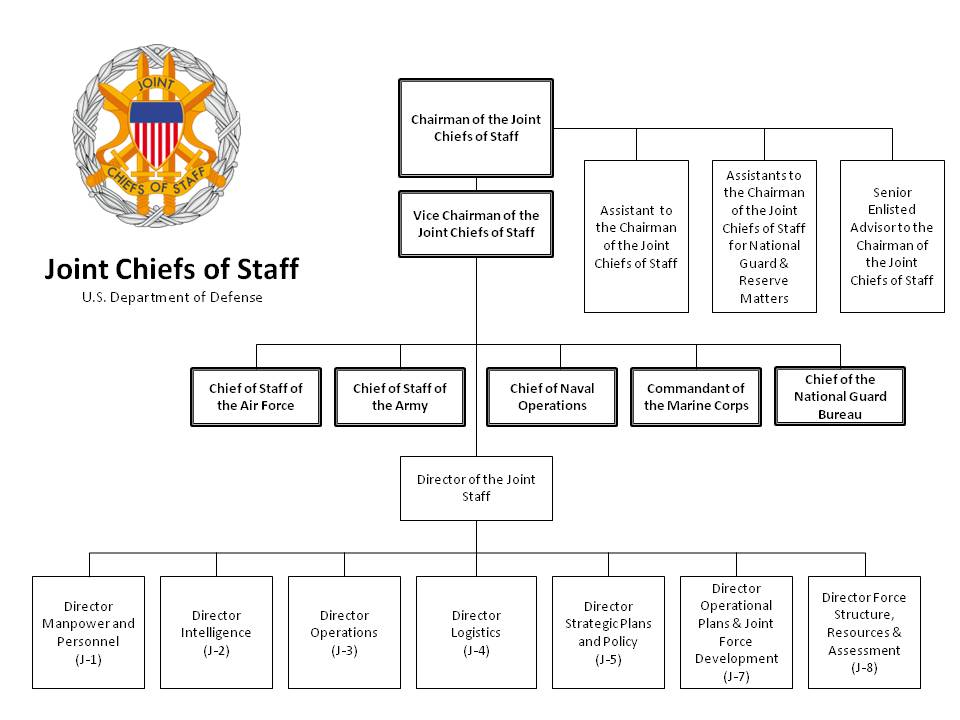
One example of an institution with chiefs of staff is the US armed forces. This organization chart shows the hierarchy of joint chiefs of staff and service-specific chiefs of staff in 2012.

In general, the positions listed below are not "chiefs of staff" as defined at the top of this page; they are the heads of the various forces/commands and tend to have subordinates that fulfill the "chief of staff" roles – the most senior staff officer managing the overall commander's staff.

=== In general ===
- Chief of the Defence
- Chief of the Defence Staff
- Chief of the General Staff
- Chief of the Army Staff
- Chief of the Air Staff
- Chief of the Naval Staff
- Category:Vice chiefs of staff

=== Azerbaijan ===
- Chief of General Staff of Azerbaijani Armed Forces - head of General Staff of Azerbaijani Armed Forces

=== Canada ===
- Chief of the Defence Staff (Canada)
  - Chief of the General Staff
  - Chief of the Naval Staff
  - Chief of the Air Staff

=== France ===
- Chief of the Defence Staff (French: Chef d'état-major des Armées, CEMA)
  - Chief of Staff of the French Air Force (French: Chef d'état-major de l'Armée de l'air, CEMAA)
  - Chief of Staff of the French Army (French: Chef d'état-major de l'Armée de terre, CEMAT)
  - Chief of Staff of the French Navy (French: Chef d'état-major de la Marine, CEMM)
- Chief of the Military Staff of the President of the Republic (French: Chef de l'état-major particulier du président de la République, CEMP)

=== Ghana ===
- Chief of Defence Staff
  - Chief of the Army Staff
  - Chief of the Navy Staff
  - Chief of the Air Staff

=== Greece ===
- Chief of the Defence Staff (Greece)
  - Chief of Staff of the Hellenic Air Force
  - Chief of Staff of the Hellenic Army
  - Chief of Staff of the Hellenic Navy

=== India ===
- Chief of Defence Staff (Indian Armed Forces)
  - Chief of the Army Staff (Indian Army)
  - Chief of the Naval Staff (Indian Navy)
  - Chief of the Air Staff (Indian Air Force)

=== Indonesia ===
- Chief of Staff of the Indonesian Army
- Chief of Staff of the Indonesian Navy
- Chief of Staff of the Indonesian Air Force

=== Ireland ===
- Chief of Staff of the Defence Forces

=== Israel ===
- Chief of the Israeli General Staff

=== Italy ===
- Chief of the Defence Staff
  - Chief of the Army Staff
  - Chief of the Navy Staff
  - Chief of the Air Force Staff

=== Pakistan ===
- Chief of Defence Force
  - Chief of the Army Staff
  - Chief of the Naval Staff
  - Chief of the Air Staff

=== Philippines ===
- Chief of Staff of the Armed Forces of the Philippines - exercises command and control over all elements of the Armed Forces of the Philippines.
  - Chief of Staff, Philippine Army
  - Chief of Naval Staff (Philippine Navy)
  - Chief of Air Staff (Philippine Air Force)

=== Portugal ===
- Chief of the General Staff of the Armed Forces (Portuguese: Chefe do Estado-Maior-General das Forças Armadas, CEMGFA) - operational commander of the Portuguese Armed Forces
  - Chief of Staff of the Navy (Portuguese: Chefe do Estado-Maior da Armada, CEMA) - commander of the Portuguese Navy
  - Chief of Staff of the Army (Portuguese: Chefe do Estado-Maior do Exército, CEME) - commander of the Portuguese Army
  - Chief of Staff of the Air Force (Portuguese: Chefe do Estado-Maior da Força Aérea, CEMFA) - commander of the Portuguese Air Force

=== Spain ===
- Chief of the Defence Staff
  - Chief of Staff of the Army
  - Chief of Staff of the Navy
  - Chief of Staff of the Air Force

=== Sri Lanka ===
- Chief of the Defence Staff (Sri Lanka) - the most senior appointment in the Sri Lankan Armed Forces.
  - Chief of Staff of the Army - deputy commander of the Sri Lankan Army
  - Chief of Staff of the Navy - deputy commander of the Sri Lankan Navy
  - Chief of Staff of the Air Force - deputy commander of the Sri Lankan Air Force

=== United Kingdom ===
- Chief of the Defence Staff (CDS) - the professional head of the British Armed Forces.
  - Chief of the Naval Staff, more commonly called the First Sea Lord
  - Chief of the General Staff, formerly the Chief of the Imperial General Staff
  - Chief of the Air Staff

The Sovereign is the Commander-in-Chief. The CDS heads the Chiefs of Staff Committee and is assisted by the Vice-Chief of the Defence Staff.

=== United States ===
- Joint Chiefs of Staff, headed by the Chairman of the Joint Chiefs of Staff (CJCS)
  - Chief of Staff of the United States Army
    - An Army general (O-10) serving as the senior ranking officer within the United States Army, but subordinate to any Army O-10 serving as CJCS or Vice CJCS
  - Chief of Staff of the United States Air Force
    - An Air Force general (O-10) serving as the senior ranking officer within the United States Air Force, but subordinate to any USAF O-10 serving as CJCS or Vice CJCS
- In unified combatant commands, headed by a general (O-10) or Navy admiral (O-10)
  - A major general (O-8) or Navy or Coast Guard rear admiral (O-8) overseeing the command's directorates
- In military commands headed by a lieutenant general (O-9), vice admiral (O-9), major general (O-8) or rear admiral (O-8), or brigadier general (O-7) or rear admiral, lower half (O-7)
  - A colonel (O-6) or Navy or Coast Guard captain (O-6) overseeing the entire general officer's/flag officer's command staff; in some cases may also be referred to as an executive assistant or executive officer
    - In some commands and organizations, two officers in pay grade O-6 may be assigned as chief of staff and executive assistant, respectively.

== See also ==
- Managing director
- Chief of Defence
- Chief Secretary (disambiguation)
- General secretary
- Permanent secretary
- Principal Private Secretary
- Provincial secretary
