= Principal Secretary to the President of Pakistan =

Post in federal government of Pakistan

- Aiwan-e-Sadr
- Reports to: President of Pakistan
- Website: Aiwan-e-Sadr

The Principal Secretary to the President of Pakistan is the administrative head of Aiwan-e-Sadr. The position was considered to be very important until 2010; however, after the Eighteenth Amendment, the presidency was reduced to a mere ceremonial role. The position holder usually belongs to the Pakistan Administrative Service. The current principal secretary to the president is Mr Inamullah Dharejo.

The longest-serving Principal Secretary to the President was ace bureaucrat Qudrat Ullah Shahab, who served with three heads of state.

== See also ==
- Principal Secretary to the Prime Minister of Pakistan
- Government of Pakistan
- Federal Secretary
- Interior Secretary of Pakistan
- Cabinet Secretary of Pakistan
