= Permanent secretary =

Senior civil servant who runs a ministry or department on a day-to-day basis

A permanent secretary is the most senior civil servant of a department or ministry charged with running the department or ministry's day-to-day activities. Permanent secretaries are the non-political civil service chief executives of government departments or ministries, who generally hold their position for a number of years (thus "permanent") at a ministry as distinct from the changing political secretaries of state to whom they report and provide advice. The role originated in the civil service of the United Kingdom and has been adopted in several Commonwealth countries as well as other countries influenced by the Westminster system.

== Country ==
=== Australia ===
In Australia, the position is called the "department secretary", “secretary of the department”, or “director-general of the department” in some states and territories.

=== Canada ===
In Canada, the senior civil service position is a "deputy minister", who within a government ministry or department is outranked only by a minister of the Crown. Federally, deputy ministers are appointed by the prime minister on the advice of the secretary to the cabinet (the Head of Canada's civil service). They are considered to hold equal rank with parliamentary secretaries or assistants – legislators appointed to assist ministers in their duties – and are entitled to several privileges, including the use of diplomatic passports.

=== Germany ===
In Germany, the equivalent office is called "Staatssekretär" (state secretary). It is not to be confused with the "parliamentary state secretary", who serves as deputy to a minister, often with a more specialised field of responsibilities. The parliamentary state secretary is always a political position, and not part of the civil service.

=== Hong Kong ===
In Hong Kong, heads of policy bureaux, secretaries, were filled by civil servants until their titles were changed to permanent secretaries in 2002, when political appointees filled the positions of secretaries under the second Tung Chee Hwa government. Since August 2005, the Office of the Chief Executive also has a permanent secretary. His ranking is, however, lower than most other permanent secretaries according to the pay scale.

=== India ===
In India, the equivalent position is called "secretary to the Government of India" and is the highest-ranking permanent civil servant in a department. With the exception of departments within the Ministry of External Affairs, which are headed by Indian Foreign Service officers, all Secretaries to the Government of India are drawn from cadres of the Indian Administrative Service.

These officers directly report to Ministers of the Union within their respective ministry, and oversee all day-to-day operations of their departments. Within the civil service, they are outranked only by the Cabinet Secretary of India or the Principal Secretary to the Prime Minister of India when the latter is granted the rank of Cabinet Secretary (as has been the case under Prime Minister Narendra Modi).

=== Indonesia ===
In Indonesia, the equivalent position is called secretary-general (Indonesian: Sekretaris Jenderal, abbreviated Sekjen), one of the highest-ranking permanent civil servants in a ministry, leads the General Secretariat (Indonesian: Sekretariat Jenderal, abbreviated Setjen). These officers directly report to the minister in their respective ministry or to the respective leader in state bodies.

=== Ireland ===
In the Civil service of the Republic of Ireland, the position of secretary general of a Department of state is almost identical to that of a permanent secretary in the British Civil Service, except that the position is not permanent, having a term of seven years. This limit was introduced by the Strategic Management Initiative of the mid-1990s, when also the title was changed from "secretary". Irish government departments may also have a "second secretary", which is equivalent to the second permanent secretary grade in the British civil service.

=== Israel ===
In Israel, the equivalent office is called מנהל כללי, a term which is ordinarily translated as "chief executive officer". The official English translation for the government post is "director general". Directors general of ministries are nominated by the relevant minister and confirmed by the Government, and serve at the pleasure of the ministers above them.

=== Italy ===
In Italy, the highest civil service official in a ministry or department is either a segretario generale (secretary-general) or a direttore generale (director-general), while the position of sottosegretario di stato (under-secretary of state) is a political one and ranks below the ministro segretario di stato (minister-secretary of state, the head of a ministry or department) or the vice ministro (deputy-minister), both political posts as well.

=== Japan ===
The Japanese equivalents are the administrative vice-ministers.

=== Kenya ===
In Kenya, the equivalent office is called "principal secretary", which is a position established by the Constitution of Kenya as an office in the country's civil service. Principal secretaries serve as the administrative head of a state department within a ministry and are responsible for the department's daily affairs. A principal secretary is nominated by the president of Kenya from a group of persons recommended by the country's Public Service Commission and upon approval by the country's National Assembly, is appointed to office by the president.

The Constitution of Kenya grants the president the power to re-assign a principal secretary.

=== Malaysia ===
In Malaysia, a permanent secretary refers to the administrative head of a ministry in the states of Sabah and Sarawak. The administrative head of a federal ministry is called "secretary general".

=== Mauritius ===
On the island state of Mauritius, which is a former British colony, there are a number of permanent secretaries who report to the Secretary to Cabinet and Head of the Civil Service. In the prime minister's office there are 2 permanent secretaries, assisted by 3 deputy permanent secretaries as well as 4 assistant permanent secretaries. There are at least 147 Assistant Permanent Secretaries, 86 Deputy Permanent Secretaries and 37 Permanent Secretaries in the various Ministries of the Government of Mauritius.

=== New Zealand ===
In New Zealand, the civil service head of a ministry is ordinarily entitled "chief executive", although there are still some positions which carry the title of secretary (secretary of education, secretary of justice, secretary of transport). In some cases (such as the New Zealand Security Intelligence Service, Ministry for Primary Industries, Department of Conservation, Ministry of Health) the title is "director-general". Organisations with enforcement powers, such as the Inland Revenue Department and the New Zealand Police, are headed by commissioners. The New Zealand Customs Service is headed by the comptroller of customs. Civil service heads are officially employed by the State Services Commission, further separating them from the politicians who hold ministerial positions.

=== Norway ===
The Permanent Under-Secretary of State of the Ministry of Foreign Affairs in Norway is the ministry's top civil servant.

=== Pakistan ===
In Pakistan, the equivalent position is called Federal Secretary and is the highest ranking permanent civil servant in a federal ministry.

=== Singapore ===
In Singapore, permanent secretaries have to retire after a ten-year term even if they are younger than the official retirement age of 62. This was introduced in 2000 as part of the Public Service Leadership scheme, to provide opportunities for younger officers from the Administrative Service – the elite arm of the Civil Service – to rise up the ranks.

=== Spain ===
In the General State Administration of Spain, the closest equivalent is the Under-Secretary (Subsecretario), the highest-ranking career civil servant within a ministry. Appointed by the Council of Ministers (Spain) upon the proposal of the relevant minister, Under-Secretaries are responsible for the ministry’s internal governance, including the coordination of administrative services, management of personnel and budgetary resources, regulatory oversight, and institutional relations. They ensure the continuity, legality, and efficiency of ministerial operations under the political direction of the minister. The role is regulated primarily by Law 40/2015 on the Legal Regime of the Public Sector.

=== Sri Lanka ===
In Sri Lanka, a "secretary to the ministry" (also known as ministry secretary or simply secretary) is the administrative head of a ministry and is appointed by the president of Sri Lanka. The post of permanent secretary was created under the Ceylon (Constitution and Independence) Orders in Council 1947 when Ceylon gained self-rule from Britain in 1948. Permanent secretaries were commonly appointed from the Ceylon Civil Service, with a few exceptions such as the permanent secretary to the ministry of justice which would be an officer of the judicial service. Anandatissa de Alwis was the first person from the private sector to be appointed as permanent secretary. The Sri Lankan Constitution of 1972, changed the title to secretary to the ministry. Traditionally if the appointee is a serving member of the public service, he or she would leave the service for the duration they hold the appointment. In the recent past it has been common for ministry secretaries to be appointed from outside the public service, with some on political grounds at the discretion of the president on the advice of the minister in charge. Major General Sanjeewa Munasinghe became the first serving military officer from the regular force to be appointed a ministry secretary in 2020.

=== United Kingdom ===
The title permanent secretary, or, in some departments permanent under-secretary of state, is the most senior civil servant of a government department in the United Kingdom. The role originated in 1830, and has been adopted in several Commonwealth countries as well as other countries influenced by the Westminster system.

== See also ==
- Chief secretary
- Minister (government)
- Parliamentary assistant
- Parliamentary secretary
- Principal Secretary
- Private secretary
- Undersecretary
