= Principal Secretary to the Prime Minister of Pakistan =

Governmental position

Secretary to the Prime Minister of Pakistan
- معتمدِ وزیر اعظم پاکستان
- Incumbent; No Office Holder
- Prime Minister's Office
- Reports to: Prime Minister of Pakistan
- Appointer: Prime Minister of Pakistan
- Website: Prime Minister's Office

The secretary to the prime minister of Pakistan (also referred to as SPM or PM's chief of staff) is the administrative head and highest-ranking official of the Prime Minister's Office. The position holder is usually an officer belonging to the Pakistan Administrative Service serving in BPS-22 grade. The secretary advises and assists the prime minister on all the official business routed through the PM Office, and because of this the SPM is generally regarded as the most crucial aide to the prime minister.

PM Shehbaz Sharif decided to abolish the post of PSPM, and his newly appointed adviser, Dr Tauqir Shah, who has the status of federal minister, will serve in place of PSPM in capacity of PM’s adviser.

Being the administrative head of the Prime Minister's Office, the secretary wields significant amount of power over the daily affairs of the Government of Pakistan. The duties of the secretary includes, but are not limited to; advising the prime minister on national policy and its implementation, dealing with official paperwork in the Prime Minister's Office, placing before the prime minister critical files of importance for approval, coordinating activities in the Prime Minister's Office, and preparing notes on issues to be discussed by the PM with senior politicians, bureaucrats and other dignitaries.

== List of principal secretaries to PM ==
No.	Name of principal secretary	Name of prime minister	Service
1	Anwar Zahid	Muhammad Khan Junejo	Pakistan Administrative Service
2	Usman Ali Isani	Muhammad Khan Junejo	Pakistan Administrative Service
3	Salim Abbas Jillani	Benazir Bhutto	Pakistan Administrative Service
4	Usman Ali Isani	Benazir Bhutto; Ghulam Mustafa Jatoi	Pakistan Administrative Service
5	Anwar Zahid	Nawaz Sharif	Pakistan Administrative Service
6	Qazi M. Alimullah	Nawaz Sharif; Balakh Sher Mazari	Pakistan Administrative Service
7	Shamsher Ali Khan	Nawaz Sharif	Pakistan Administrative Service
8	Mohammad Ahmed Sadik	Benazir Bhutto	Pakistan Administrative Service
9	Aminullah Chaudry	Malik Meraj Khalid	Pakistan Administrative Service
10	A. Z. K. Sherdil	Nawaz Sharif	Pakistan Administrative Service
11	Saeed Mehdi	Nawaz Sharif	Pakistan Administrative Service
12	Nasiruddin Ahmed	Zafarullah Khan Jamali	Pakistan Administrative Service
13	Shuja Shah	Zafarullah Khan Jamali	Pakistan Administrative Service
14	Javed Sadiq Malik	Shaukat Aziz	Pakistan Administrative Service
15	Khalid Saeed	Shaukat Aziz	Pakistan Administrative Service
16	Siraj Shamsuddin	Yousaf Raza Gillani	Pakistan Administrative Service
17	Nargis Sethi	Yousaf Raza Gillani	Pakistan Administrative Service
18	Khushnood Akhtar Lashari	Yousaf Raza Gillani	Pakistan Administrative Service
19	Muhammad Ayub Qazi	Raja Pervaiz Ashraf	Pakistan Administrative Service
20	Seerat Asghar Jaura	Mir Hazar Khan Khoso	Pakistan Administrative Service
21	Khawaja Siddique Akbar	Mir Hazar Khan Khoso	Pakistan Administrative Service
22	Nasir Mahmood Khosa	Nawaz Sharif	Pakistan Administrative Service
23	Javaid Aslam	Nawaz Sharif	Pakistan Administrative Service
24	Fawad Hasan Fawad	Nawaz Sharif; Shahid Khaqan Abbasi	Pakistan Administrative Service
25	Suhail Aamir	Nasirul Mulk	Pakistan Administrative Service
26	Muhammad Azam Khan	Imran Khan	Pakistan Administrative Service
27	Dr. Syed Tauqir Shah	Shahbaz Sharif; Anwaar ul Haq Kakar	Pakistan Administrative Service
28	Khurram Agha	Anwaar ul Haq Kakar	Pakistan Administrative Service
29	Asad Rehman Gilani	Shehbaz Sharif	Pakistan Administrative Service

== See also ==
- Principal Secretary to the President of Pakistan
- Government of Pakistan
- Federal Secretary
- Interior Secretary of Pakistan
- Finance Secretary of Pakistan
