= Chief of Staff of the Air Force =

Chief of Staff of the Air Force may refer to:

- Chief of Staff of the French Air Force
- Chief of Staff of the Indonesian Air Force
- Chief of Staff of the Italian Air Force
- Chief of Staff of the Air Force (South Korea)
- Chief of Staff of the Air Force (Spain)
- Chief of Staff of the United States Air Force

== See also ==
- Chief of Staff of the Army (disambiguation)
- Chief of Staff of the Navy (disambiguation)
- Air force (disambiguation)
- Chief of Air Force (disambiguation)
- Chief of the Air Staff (disambiguation)
- Commander of the Air Force (disambiguation)
- Air Staff (disambiguation)
- Chief of the Defence Staff (disambiguation)
