= Chief of Staff of the Army =

Chief of Staff of the Army may refer to:

- Chief of Staff of the French Army
- Chief of Staff of the Indonesian Army
- Chief of Staff of the Italian Army
- Chief of Staff of the Irish Republican Army
- Chief of Staff of the Republic of Korea Army
- Chief of Staff of the People's National Army
- Chief of Staff of the Sri Lanka Army
- Chief of the Staff of The Salvation Army
- Chief of Staff of the Army (Spain)
- Chief of Staff of the United States Army

== See also ==
- Chief of Staff of the Air Force (disambiguation)
- Chief of Staff of the Navy (disambiguation)
- Chief of Army (disambiguation)
- Chief of the Army Staff (disambiguation)
- Commander of the Army (disambiguation)
- Chief of the Defence Staff (disambiguation)
