= Chairman of the Joint Chiefs of Staff =

Highest-ranking US Armed Forces officer

- Seal of the Joint Chiefs of Staff

- Flag of the chairman of the Joint Chiefs of Staff

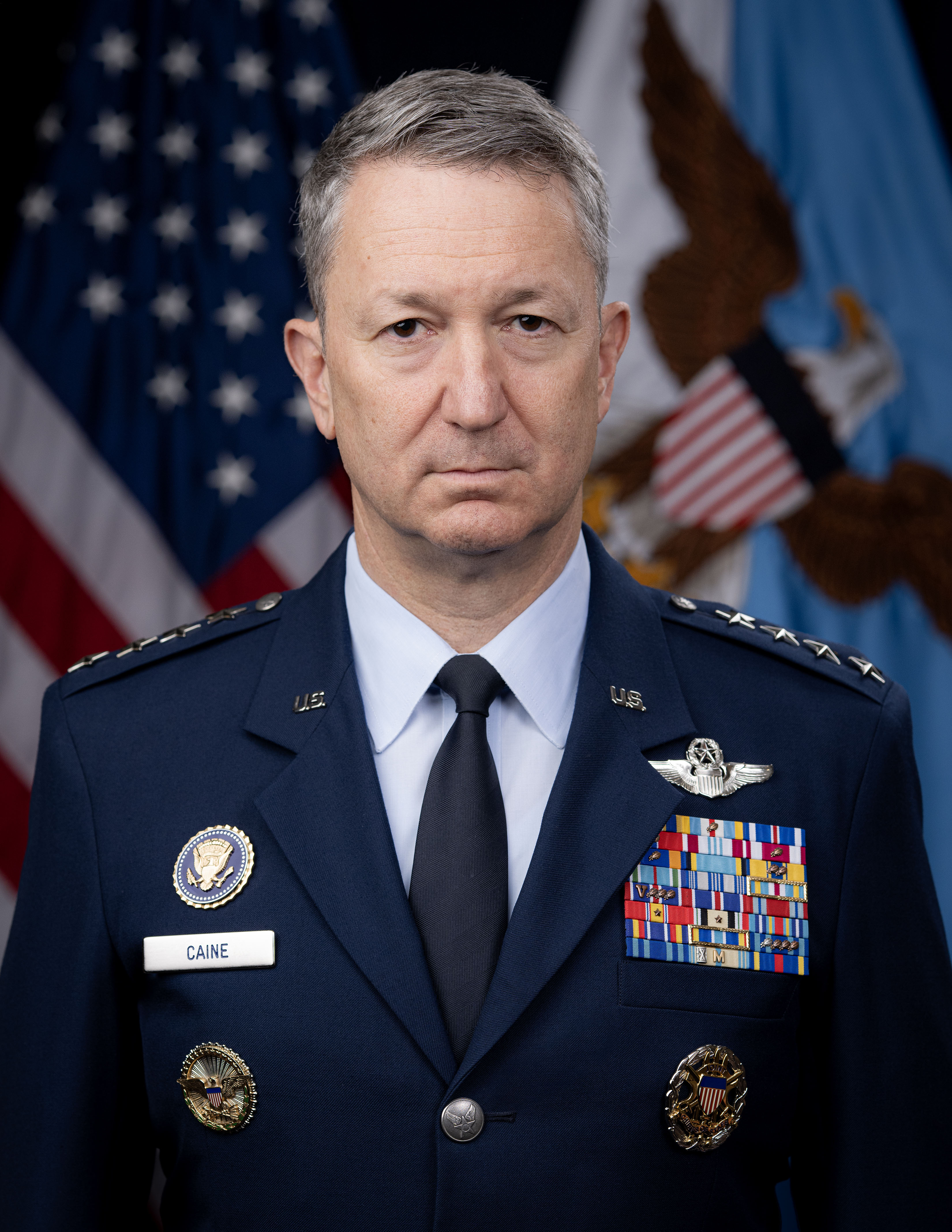
- Incumbent; General Dan Caine, USAF since 11 April 2025
- Joint Chiefs of Staff; Department of Defense
- Type: Highest-ranking military officer
- Abbreviation: CJCS
- Member of: Joint Chiefs of Staff; National Security Council
- Reports to: President; Secretary of Defense
- Residence: Quarters 6, Fort Myer
- Seat: The Pentagon, Arlington County, Virginia
- Nominator: Secretary of Defense
- Appointer: The president; with Senate advice and consent
- Term length: 4 years, not renewable
- Constituting instrument: 10 U.S.C. § 152; 10 U.S.C. § 153
- Precursor: Chief of Staff to the Commander in Chief of the Army and Navy
- Formation: 19 August 1949; 77 years ago
- First holder: General of the Army Omar Bradley
- Deputy: Vice Chairman; Director (Joint Staff); Senior Enlisted Advisor (Enlisted Matters)
- Website: www.jcs.mil

The chairman of the Joint Chiefs of Staff (CJCS) is the presiding officer of the Joint Chiefs of Staff (JCS). The chairman is the highest-ranking and most senior military personnel in the United States Armed Forces and the principal military advisor to the president, the National Security Council, the Homeland Security Council, and the secretary of defense. Although the chairman of the Joint Chiefs of Staff outranks all other commissioned officers, the chairman is prohibited by law from having operational command authority over the armed forces; however, the chairman assists the president and the secretary of defense in exercising their command functions.

The chairman convenes the meetings and coordinates the efforts of the Joint Chiefs, an advisory body within the Department of Defense comprising the chairman, the vice chairman of the Joint Chiefs of Staff, the chief of staff of the Army, the commandant of the Marine Corps, the chief of naval operations, the chief of staff of the Air Force, the chief of space operations, and the chief of the National Guard Bureau. The post of a statutory and permanent Joint Chiefs of Staff chair was created by the 1949 amendments to the National Security Act of 1947. The 1986 Goldwater–Nichols Act elevated the chairman from the first among equals to becoming the "principal military advisor" to the president and the secretary of defense.

The Joint Staff, managed by the director of the Joint Staff and consisting of military personnel from all the services, assists the chairman in fulfilling his duties to the president and secretary of defense, and functions as a conduit and collector of information between the chairman and the combatant commanders. The National Military Command Center (NMCC) is part of the Joint Staff operations directorate (J-3).

Although the office of Chairman of the Joint Chiefs of Staff is considered very important and highly prestigious, the chairman, the vice chairman and the Joint Chiefs of Staff as a body do not have any command authority over combatant forces. The Goldwater–Nichols Act places the operational chain of command from the president to the secretary of defense directly to the commanders of the unified combatant commands. However, the service chiefs do have authority over personnel assignments and oversight over resources and personnel allocated to the combatant commands within their respective services (derived from the service secretaries).

The chairman may also transmit communications to the combatant commanders from the president and secretary of defense as well as allocate additional funding to the combatant commanders if necessary. The chairman also performs all other functions prescribed under 10 U.S.C. § 153 or allocates those duties and responsibilities to other officers in the joint staff.

== Organization and assistants ==
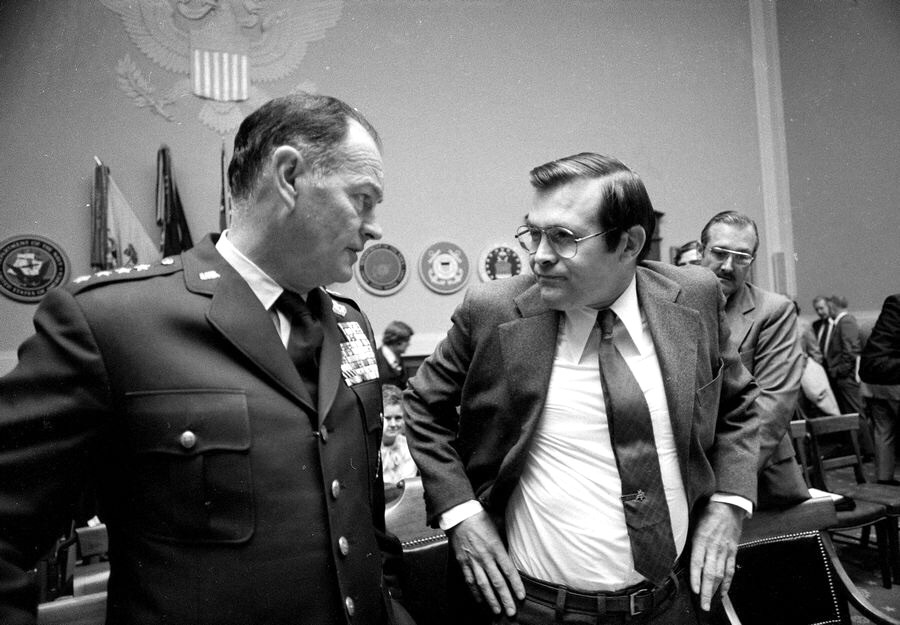
JCS chairman General George Scratchley Brown with Secretary of Defense Donald Rumsfeld during testimony before the Senate Armed Services Committee on January 15, 1976.

The principal deputy to the chairman is the vice chairman of the Joint Chiefs of Staff (VCJCS), another four-star general or admiral, who, among many duties, chairs the Joint Requirements Oversight Council (JROC).

The chairman of the Joint Chiefs of Staff is assisted by the Joint Staff, led by the director of the Joint Staff, a three-star general or admiral. The Joint Staff is an organization composed of approximately equal numbers of officers contributed by the Army, Navy, Marine Corps, Air Force, and Space Force who have been assigned to assist the chairman with the unified strategic direction, operation, and integration of the combatant land, naval, air, and space forces. The National Military Command Center (NMCC) is part of the Joint Staff operations directorate (J-3).

The chairman of the Joint Chiefs of Staff is also advised on enlisted personnel matters by the senior enlisted advisor to the chairman, who serves as a communication conduit between the chairman and the senior enlisted advisors (command sergeants major, command master chief petty officers, and command chief master sergeants) of the combatant commands.

Traditionally, the chairman serves as the final speaker of the National Memorial Day Concert held on the day before Memorial Day.

== Establishment of the CJCS position ==
The Joint Chiefs of Staff (JCS) was established by the Joint Chiefs of Staff Act of 1942, which was signed into law on 1 July 1942. This act formalized the advisory body consisting of the senior military leaders of the Army, Navy, and later the Air Force, to assist the president and the secretary of war (later the secretary of defense) with coordinating military strategy during World War II.

Before the establishment of the chairman of the Joint Chiefs of Staff (CJCS), military leadership was more decentralized, with the service chiefs coordinating independently. The JCS existed as a body of senior military leaders, but no single officer held the position of chairman. Instead, leadership was shared, and the group advised the president and the secretary of defense on military matters.

Fleet Admiral William D. Leahy served as Chief of Staff to the Commander in Chief of the Army and Navy from 20 July 1942, to 21 March 1949. In this role, he presided over meetings of the Joint Chiefs of Staff, helping to unify military strategy during World War II. Leahy's office is considered a precursor to the position of CJCS, as it began to centralize military leadership and coordination.

The position of CJCS was formally established by an 10 August 1949 amendment to the National Security Act of 1947 (50 U.S.C. § 44), which restructured the U.S. military after World War II. The first individual to hold the title of Chairman was General Omar Bradley, who was appointed in 1949.

== Appointment and rank ==
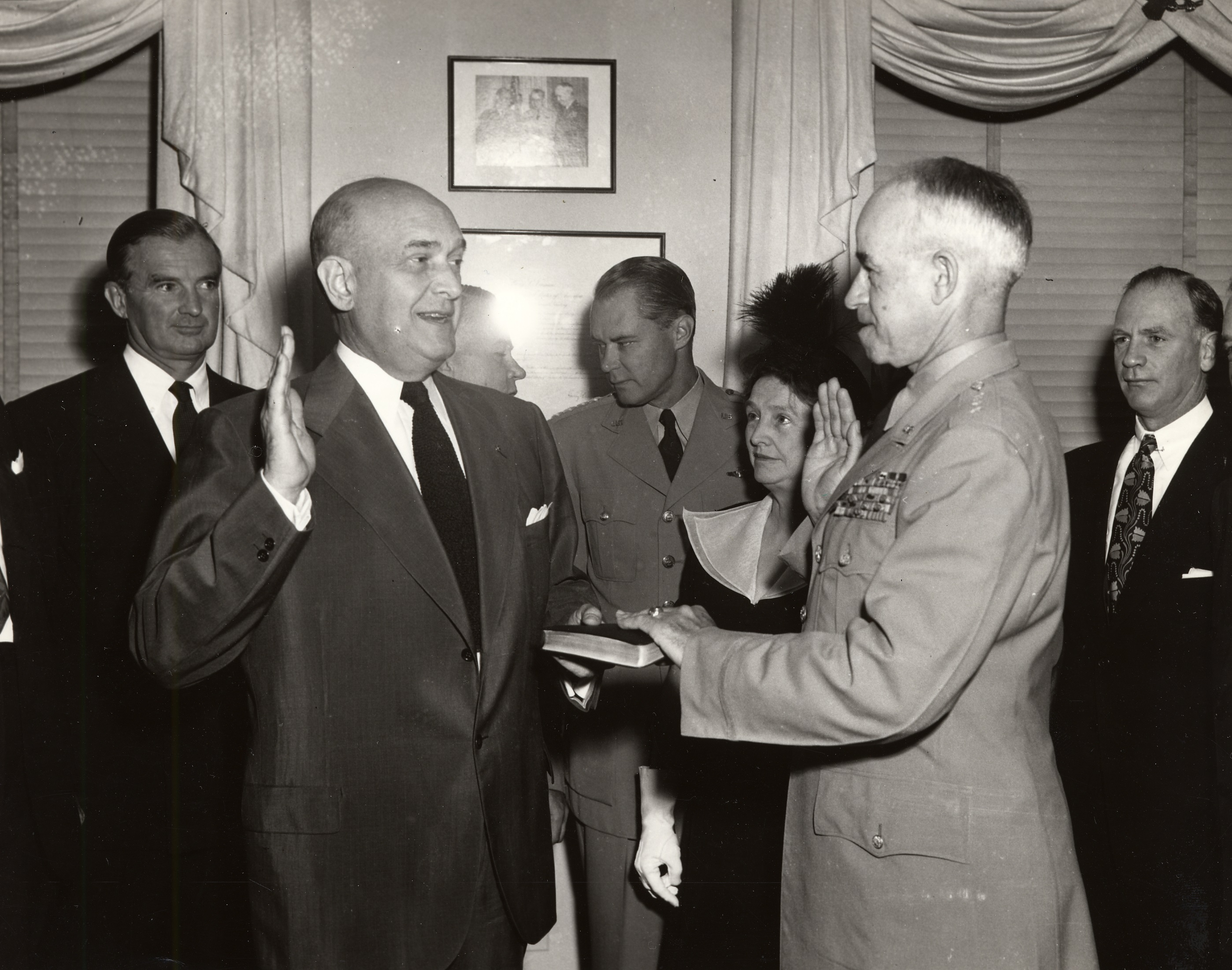
General Omar Bradley is sworn in as the 1st chairman of the Joint Chiefs of Staff by Secretary of Defense Louis A. Johnson on August 16, 1949.

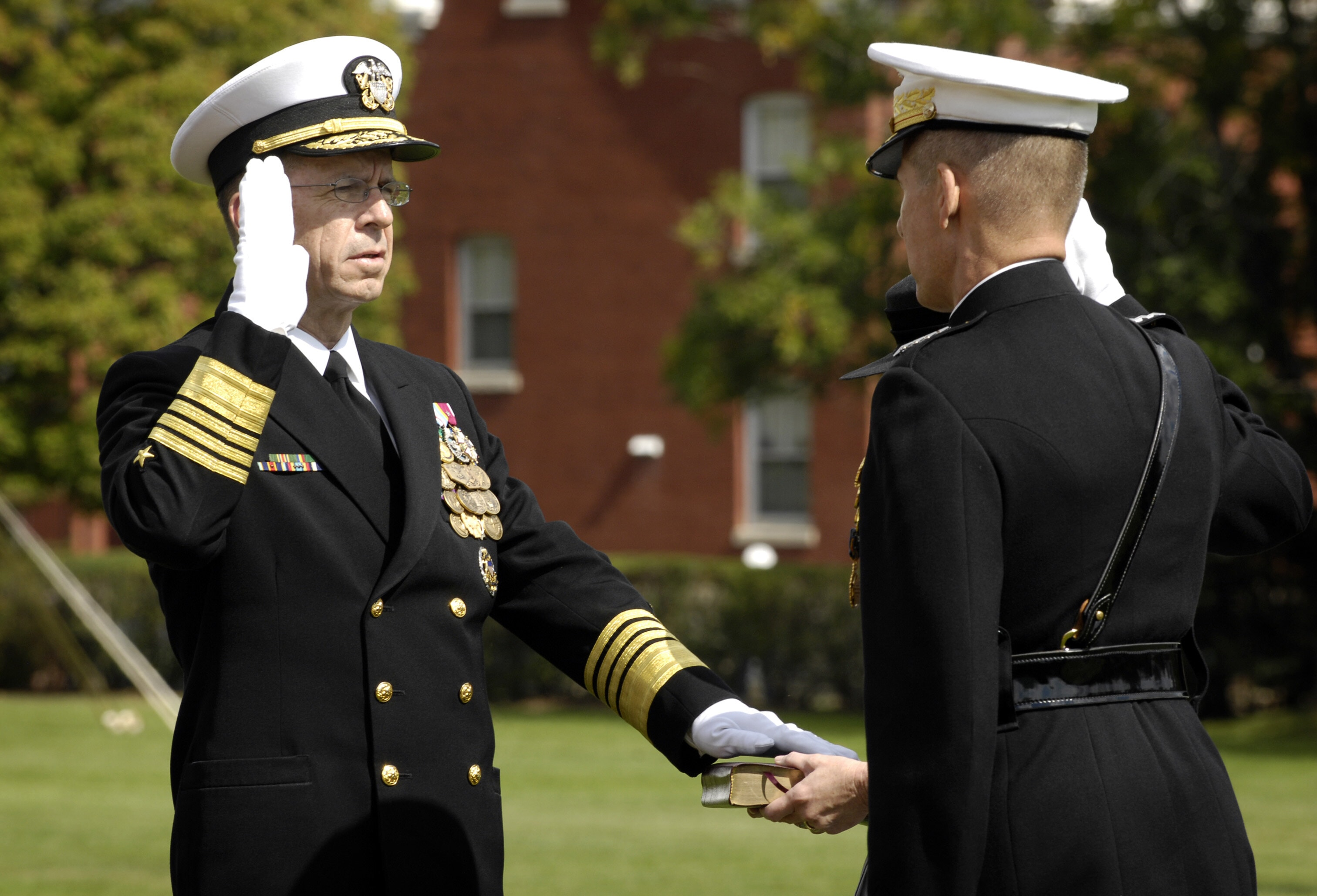
Admiral Michael Mullen is sworn in as the 17th chairman of the Joint Chiefs of Staff by his predecessor, General Peter Pace on October 1, 2007.

The chairman is nominated by the president for appointment from any of the regular components of the armed forces, and must be confirmed via majority vote by the Senate. The chairman and vice chairman may not be members of the same armed force service branch. However, the president may waive that restriction for a limited period of time in order to provide for the orderly transition of officers appointed to serve in those positions. The chairman serves a single four-year term of office at the pleasure of the president, with reappointment to additional terms only possible during times of war or national emergency.

Historically, the chairman served two two-year terms, until the National Defense Authorization Act for Fiscal Year 2017 amended the chairman's term of office to a single four-year term. By statute, the chairman is appointed as a four-star general or admiral while holding office and assumes office on 1 October of odd-numbered years.

Although the first chairman of the Joint Chiefs of Staff, Omar Bradley, was eventually awarded a fifth star, the CJCS does not receive one by right, and Bradley's award was so that his subordinate, General of the Army Douglas MacArthur, would not outrank him. In the 1990s, there were proposals in Department of Defense academic circles to bestow on the chairman a five-star rank.

Previously, during the presidencies of Harry S. Truman and Dwight D. Eisenhower, the chairman of the Joint Chiefs of Staff position was rotated in accordance with the incumbent chairman's armed force service branch. As such, the incoming chairman would be from a different service branch. For example, in 1957, following the retirement of Admiral Arthur Radford as Chairman of the Joint Chiefs of Staff, President Eisenhower nominated Air Force general Nathan Twining as Radford's successor. When General Twining retired, Eisenhower nominated Army general Lyman Lemnitzer to succeed Twining as chairman.

In October 1962, President Kennedy appointed Army General Maxwell Taylor to succeed General Lemnitzer as Chairman of the Joint Chiefs of Staff. This decision — replacing an Army general with another Army general — broke the longstanding tradition of rotating the position between the Air Force, Navy, Marines, and Army. Tradition would have dictated that Kennedy appoint either Air Force chief of staff General Curtis LeMay, Chief of Naval Operations Admiral George Anderson Jr., or Commandant of the Marine Corps General David Shoup to the position. Following Maxwell's appointment, the tradition of rotating the chairmanship was discontinued.

== Pay ==
Effective 1 January 2025, according to the Monthly Rates of Basic Pay for commissioned officers, basic pay is limited to the rate of basic pay for level II of the Executive Schedule in effect during calendar year 2025, which is $18,808.20 per month for officers at pay grades O-7 through O-10. This includes officers serving as chairman or vice chairman of the Joint Chiefs of Staff, chief of staff of the Army, chief of naval operations, chief of staff of the Air Force, commandant of the Marine Corps, chief of space operations, commandant of the Coast Guard, chief of the National Guard Bureau, or the commanders of the unified combatant commands. In addition, according to 37 U.S.C. § 414, the CJCS receives an additional $4,000 a year to cover expenses related to performing official duties.

== List of chairmen ==
=== Chief of Staff to the Commander in Chief (historical predecessor office) ===
No.	Portrait	Chief of Staff to the Commander in Chief	Took office	Left office	Time in office	Service branch	Secretaries of Defense	President
1	William D. Leahy	Fleet Admiral; William D. Leahy (1875–1959)	20 July 1942	21 March 1949	6 years, 244 days	U.S. Navy	Henry L. Stimson; Robert P. Patterson; Kenneth C. Royall (of War); Frank Knox (of Navy); James V. Forrestal (1st DOD)	Franklin D. Roosevelt; Harry S. Truman

=== Chairmen of the Joint Chiefs of Staff ===
Denotes acting capacity.

No.	Portrait	Chairman of the Joint Chiefs of Staff	Took office	Left office	Time in office	Service branch	Secretaries of Defense	President
1	Omar Bradley	General of the Army; Omar Bradley (1893–1981)	19 August 1949	15 August 1953	3 years, 361 days	U.S. Army	Louis A. Johnson; George Marshall; Robert A. Lovett	Harry S. Truman; Dwight D. Eisenhower
2	Arthur W. Radford	Admiral; Arthur W. Radford (1896–1973)	15 August 1953	15 August 1957	4 years, 0 days	U.S. Navy	Charles Erwin Wilson	Dwight D. Eisenhower
3	Nathan F. Twining	General; Nathan F. Twining (1897–1982)	15 August 1957	30 September 1960	3 years, 46 days	U.S. Air Force	Charles Erwin Wilson; Neil H. McElroy; Thomas S. Gates	Dwight D. Eisenhower
4	Lyman Lemnitzer	General; Lyman Lemnitzer (1899–1988)	1 October 1960	30 September 1962	2 years, 0 days	U.S. Army	Thomas S. Gates; Robert McNamara	Dwight D. Eisenhower; John F. Kennedy
5	Maxwell D. Taylor	General; Maxwell D. Taylor (1901–1987)	1 October 1962	1 July 1964	1 year, 275 days	U.S. Army	Robert McNamara	John F. Kennedy; Lyndon B. Johnson
6	Earle Wheeler	General; Earle Wheeler (1908–1975)	3 July 1964	2 July 1970	5 years, 364 days	U.S. Army	Robert McNamara; Clark Clifford; Melvin Laird	Lyndon B. Johnson; Richard Nixon
7	Thomas H. Moorer	Admiral; Thomas H. Moorer (1912–2004)	2 July 1970	1 July 1974	3 years, 364 days	U.S. Navy	Melvin Laird; Elliot Richardson; James R. Schlesinger	Richard Nixon
8	George S. Brown	General; George S. Brown (1918–1978)	1 July 1974	20 June 1978	3 years, 354 days	U.S. Air Force	James R. Schlesinger; Donald Rumsfeld; Harold Brown	Richard Nixon; Gerald Ford; Jimmy Carter
9	David C. Jones	General; David C. Jones (1921–2013)	21 June 1978	18 June 1982	3 years, 362 days	U.S. Air Force	Harold Brown; Caspar Weinberger	Jimmy Carter; Ronald Reagan
10	John W. Vessey Jr.	General; John W. Vessey Jr. (1922–2016)	18 June 1982	30 September 1985	3 years, 104 days	U.S. Army	Caspar Weinberger	Ronald Reagan
11	William J. Crowe Jr.	Admiral; William J. Crowe Jr. (1925–2007)	1 October 1985	30 September 1989	3 years, 364 days	U.S. Navy	Caspar Weinberger; Frank Carlucci; Dick Cheney	Ronald Reagan; George H. W. Bush
12	Colin Powell	General; Colin Powell (1937–2021)	1 October 1989	30 September 1993	3 years, 364 days	U.S. Army	Dick Cheney; Les Aspin	George H. W. Bush; Bill Clinton
−	David E. Jeremiah	Admiral; David E. Jeremiah (1934–2013); Acting	1 October 1993	24 October 1993	23 days	U.S. Navy	Les Aspin	Bill Clinton
13	John Shalikashvili	General; John Shalikashvili (1936–2011)	25 October 1993	30 September 1997	3 years, 341 days	U.S. Army	Les Aspin; William J. Perry; William Cohen	Bill Clinton
14	Hugh Shelton	General; Hugh Shelton (born 1942)	1 October 1997	30 September 2001	3 years, 364 days	U.S. Army	William Cohen; Donald Rumsfeld	Bill Clinton; George W. Bush
15	Richard Myers	General; Richard Myers (born 1942)	1 October 2001	30 September 2005	3 years, 364 days	U.S. Air Force	Donald Rumsfeld	George W. Bush
16	Peter Pace	General; Peter Pace (born 1945)	1 October 2005	30 September 2007	1 year, 364 days	U.S. Marine Corps	Donald Rumsfeld; Robert Gates	George W. Bush
17	Michael Mullen	Admiral; Michael Mullen (born 1946)	1 October 2007	30 September 2011	3 years, 364 days	U.S. Navy	Robert Gates; Leon Panetta	George W. Bush; Barack Obama
18	Martin Dempsey	General; Martin Dempsey (born 1952)	1 October 2011	30 September 2015	3 years, 364 days	U.S. Army	Leon Panetta; Chuck Hagel; Ash Carter	Barack Obama
19	Joseph Dunford	General; Joseph Dunford (born 1955)	1 October 2015	30 September 2019	3 years, 364 days	U.S. Marine Corps	Ash Carter; Jim Mattis; Mark Esper	Barack Obama; Donald Trump
20	Mark Milley	General; Mark Milley (born 1958)	1 October 2019	30 September 2023	3 years, 364 days	U.S. Army	Mark Esper; Lloyd Austin	Donald Trump; Joe Biden
21	Charles Q. Brown Jr.	General; Charles Q. Brown Jr. (born 1962)	1 October 2023	21 February 2025	1 year, 143 days	U.S. Air Force	Lloyd Austin; Pete Hegseth	Joe Biden; Donald Trump
−	Christopher W. Grady	Admiral; Christopher W. Grady (born 1962); Acting	21 February 2025	11 April 2025	49 days	U.S. Navy	Pete Hegseth	Donald Trump
22	Dan Caine	General; Dan Caine (born 1968)	11 April 2025	Incumbent	1 year, 212 days	U.S. Air Force	Pete Hegseth	Donald Trump

== See also ==
- Chief of Defence
  - Chief of the Defence Force
  - Chief of the Defence Staff
  - Chief of the General Staff
- National Command Authority (United States)
- National Military Strategy (United States)
- Single Integrated Operational Plan
- Unified Command Plan
