= Chief of the Armed Forces =

Chief of the Armed Forces may refer to:

- Chief of the Armed Forces (France), the commander-in-chief of the French Military, a role vested in the President of France
- Chief of the Armed Forces (Switzerland), the commander of the Swiss Armed Forces in times of peace

== See also ==
- Armed forces (disambiguation)
- Chief of the Defence Force (disambiguation)
- Chief of the Defence Staff (disambiguation)
- Commander of the Armed Forces (disambiguation)
- Chief of the General Staff (disambiguation)
- Chief of Staff of the Armed Forces (disambiguation)
