= Chief of the Army Staff =

Chief of the Army Staff or Chief of Army Staff, which is generally abbreviated as COAS, is a title commonly used for the appointment held by the most senior staff officer or the chief commander in several nations' armies.

- Chief of Army Staff (Bangladesh)
- Chief of Army Staff (Ghana)
- Chief of the Army Staff (India)
- Chief of the Army Staff (Nepal)
- Chief of the Army Staff (Nigeria)
- Chief of the Army Staff (Pakistan)
- Chief of the Army Staff (Sweden)

== See also ==
- Chief of the Naval Staff (disambiguation)
- Chief of the Air Staff (disambiguation)
- Chief of Army (disambiguation)
- Chief of Staff of the Army (disambiguation)
- Commander of the Army (disambiguation)
- Army Staff (disambiguation)
- Chief of Staff (military)
- Chief of Army (disambiguation)
- Chief of the Defence Staff (disambiguation)
- Chief of the General Staff (disambiguation)
