= Mohammed Omar Osman =

Somali admiral

Vice Admiral Mohammed Omar Osman
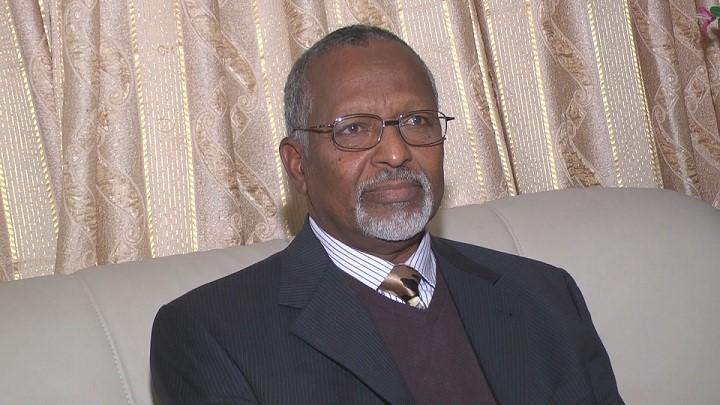
- Osman in 2021

1st Chief of the Navy
- In office circa. 1975 – 1991
- Succeeded by: Admiral Farah Qare

Personal details
- Born: 1940 (age 85–86) Italian East Africa (now Somalia)
- Party: XHKS (c. 1975–1991); ONLF (1998-present)
- Education: (Egypt) Egyptian Military Academy; (Soviet Union) Kuznetsov Military Academy
- Awards: Order of the Somali Star, 1st Class

Military service
- Allegiance: Somalia
- Branch/service: Somali Navy
- Years of service: (1960's–1991)
- Rank: Vice Admiral
- Commands: General Staff of the Navy

Admiral Mohamed Omar Osman (born 1940) (Somali: Maxamad Cumar Cismaan) is a Somali admiral, war hero, and the incumbent chairman of the Ogaden National Liberation Front (ONLF).

== Early life and education ==
He was born in Somalia, but attended secondary school in Mogadishu. He later went to Egypt where he graduated from the Naval Section of the Egyptian War College where Somali Army generals were completing their military education simultaneously, and later Admiral Osman completed his naval military education in the Soviet Union's Kuznetsov Military Academy.

== Naval Service ==
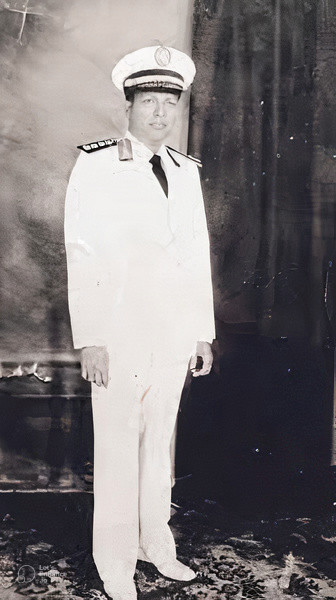
Commodore Admiral Osman in the early 1970s

After returning to Somalia, he was appointed a member of the central committee of the ruling Somali Revolutionary Socialist Party in the mid-1970s, then became chief of the secretariate of party's Naval office advising the SRSP Politbureau.

Years later in 1980s, he was appointed commander of the Somali Navy and promoted to the rank of vice admiral, as chief of naval operations, he oversaw and commanded navy forces in the Ogaden war against the Ethiopian Navy and commanded naval units to assist the Army.

After the collapse of the central government in Somalia in 1991, he returned to the Somali Region in Ethiopia, where in 1998 he was chosen to be the leader of the ONLF at the Party Congress.

== Chairmanship of the ONLF and later life ==
In 1998 Osman became head of the ONLF. He accused Puntland and Somaliland of actively working with Ethiopia to fight the group. In the later years, Admiral Osman and his supporters had been in a power struggle against a group led by the ONLF head of Planning and Research Department, Dr. Mohamed Sirad Dalool, who was assassinated March 2009. This has reportedly led to a split in the ONLF, with one faction loyal to Admiral Osman, while another, led by Abdiwali Hussein Gas, holds Admiral Osman responsible for Dr. Dalool's death. It is said that Dr. Dalool and Admiral Osman were very close friends and that he relied heavily on Dr. Dalool for advice, and that he was a key member of the party.
