= Commander of the Navy =

Commander of the Navy may refer to:

- Commander of the Navy (Azerbaijan)
- Commander of the Navy (Belgium)
- Commander of the Brazilian Navy
- Commander of the Royal Canadian Navy
- Commander of the Croatian Navy
- Commander of the Navy (Egypt)
- Commander of the Ethiopian Navy
- Commander of the Iranian Navy
- Commander of the Navy (Israel)
- Commander of the Royal Netherlands Navy
- Commander of the People's Liberation Army Navy
- Commander of the Navy (Romania)
- Commander of the Navy (Sri Lanka)
- Commander of the Turkish Naval Forces
- Commander of the Navy (Taiwan)
- Commander of the Navy (Ukraine)
- Commander of the Navy (Vietnam)
- Commander of the Yugoslav Navy

== See also ==
- Commander of the Army (disambiguation)
- Commander of the Air Force (disambiguation)
