= Chief of Staff of the Navy =

Chief of Staff of the Navy may refer to:

- Chief of Staff of the French Navy
- Chief of Staff of the Indonesian Navy
- Chief of Staff of the Italian Navy
- Chief of Naval Operations (South Korea)
- Chief of Staff of the Navy (Spain)
- Chief of Staff of the Sri Lanka Navy
- Chief of Naval Operations
- Chief of the Royal Danish Navy

== See also ==
- Chief of Staff of the Army (disambiguation)
- Chief of Staff of the Air Force (disambiguation)
- Chief of Navy (disambiguation)
- Chief of the Naval Staff (disambiguation)
- Commander of the Army (disambiguation)
- Chief of the Defence Staff (disambiguation)
