= Viktor Fyodorov =

Russian naval officer

Viktor Dmitryevich Fyodorov
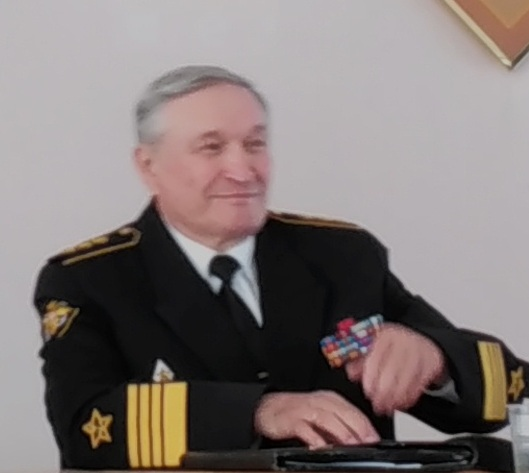
- Born: 23 November 1947 (age 78); Zharomte, China
- Allegiance: Soviet Union; Russia
- Branch: Soviet Navy; Russian Navy
- Service years: 1968-2007
- Rank: Admiral
- Commands: Primorskaya Flotilla; Pacific Fleet
- Awards: Order "For Merit to the Fatherland" Fourth Class; Order of Military Merit; Order of the Red Star; Order "For Service to the Homeland in the Armed Forces of the USSR" Third Class

Viktor Dmitryevich Fyodorov (Russian: Виктор Дмитриевич Фёдоров; born 23 November 1947) is a retired officer of the Soviet and Russian Navies. He holds the rank of admiral, and served as commander of the Pacific Fleet between 2001 and 2007.

== Career ==
Fyodorov was born into a military family on 23 November 1947, in Zharomte, China. He moved with his family in 1959 to Novotsurukhaituy, Priargunsky District, Zabaykalsky Krai, and graduated from Secondary School No. 3 in Priargunsk. He later studied at the Far Eastern Maritime School of the Ministry of the Fishing Industry, graduating with honours in 1968. He joined the Soviet Navy that year, being appointed as head of the navigational departments aboard the minesweepers MT-65 and MT-68. Receiving his officer's commission in 1971, from 1971 to 1973 he was assistant commander of the minesweeper MT-66, and then until 1977, commander of the minesweeper MT-421. He combined the later role with studies at the Pacific Higher Naval School, graduating in absentia with a diploma in 1976. In 1977 he enrolled at the Grechko Naval Academy, graduating in 1979 and being appointed that year to command the 146th Defensive Squadron of the 47th Defensive Ship Brigade of initially the Primorskaya Flotilla between 1979 and 1980, and the Sakhalin Flotilla between 1980 and 1981. From these posts he rose to be chief of staff of the 47th Defensive Ship Brigade between 1981 and 1983, the brigade's commander from 1983 to 1985, and then chief of the operative department of the staff of the Primorskaya Flotilla until 1987.

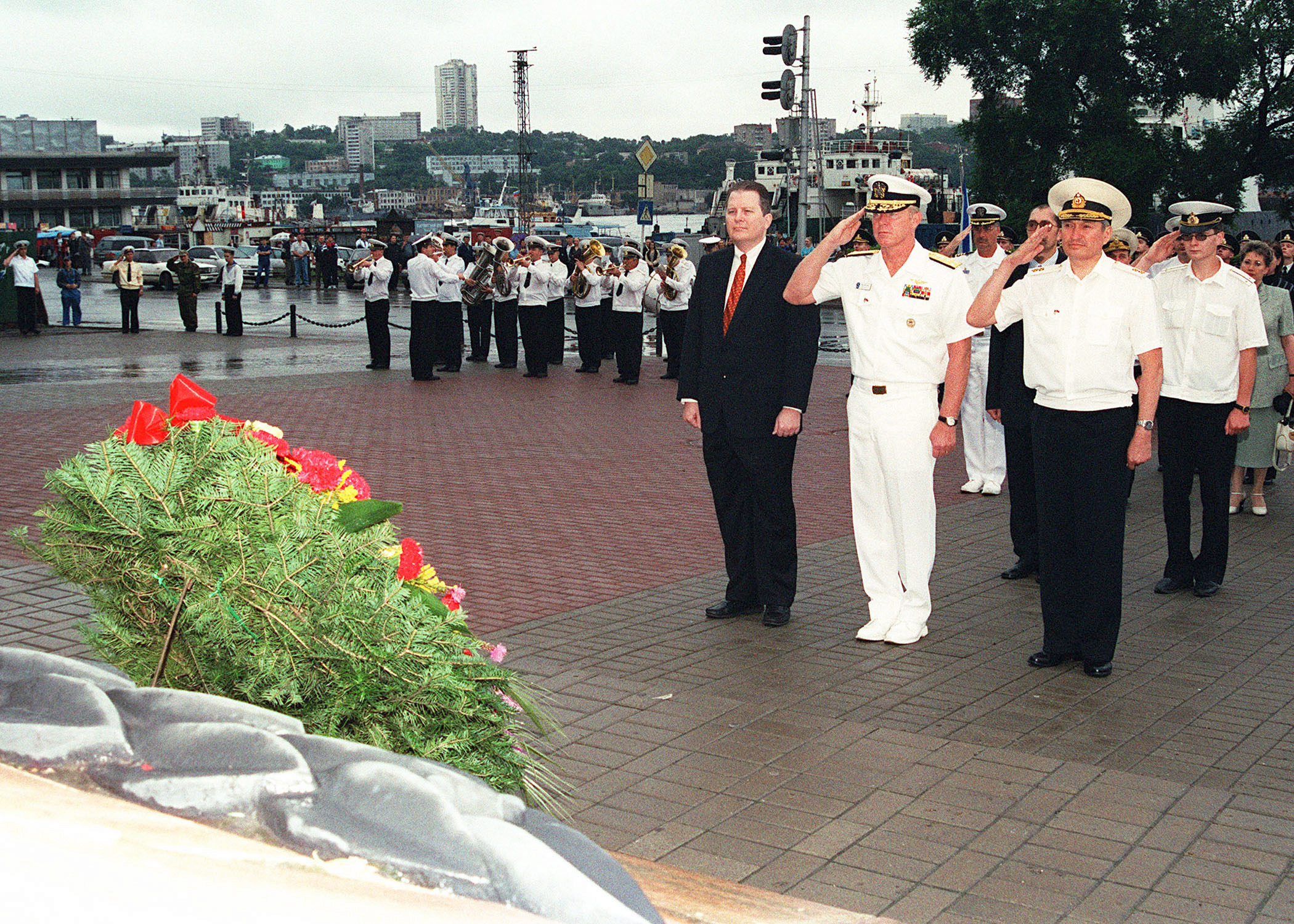
Fyodorov and US Navy Vice-Admiral Robert F. Willard at a memorial ceremony in Vladivostok in 2002

Fyodorov spent the next three years in this role, before in 1990 being sent to serve as an advisor to the Commander of the Ethiopian Navy. In 1991, he was appointed head of the organizational and mobilization department and deputy chief of staff of the Pacific Fleet. During this time, the dissolution of the Soviet Union took place, and Fyodorov entered service with the successor force, the Russian Navy. His next post, from 1993, was as commander of the Primorskaya Flotilla, and then from September 1997, as chief of staff of the Pacific Fleet. He completed studies at the Military Academy of the General Staff in 2001, and on 3 December 2001, he was appointed commander of the Pacific Fleet, being promoted to the rank of admiral on 21 February 2002. He held the post until his retirement, on 6 December 2007.

In retirement, Fyodorov works with youth and schoolchildren on patriotic projects in Krasnodar Krai. He is also chief inspector of the group of inspectors of the Southern Military District, and chief inspector of the Black Sea Fleet.

== Awards and personal life ==
Fyodorov is married, with a son. Over his career Fyodorov has received the Order "For Merit to the Fatherland" fourth class, the Order of Military Merit, the Order of the Red Star, and the Order "For Service to the Homeland in the Armed Forces of the USSR" third class, as well as numerous other medals and awards. In 2006, he was named an honorary citizen of Vladivostok.
