= Chief of Navy =

Chief of Navy may refer to:

- Chief of Navy (Australia)
- Chief of the Royal Danish Navy
- Chief of Navy (Malaysia)
- Chief of Navy (New Zealand)
- Chief of the Navy (Norway)
- Chief of the Navy (Philippines)
- Chief of the Navy (Somalia)
- Chief of Navy (Singapore)
- Chief of Navy (Sweden)

== See also ==
- Chief of Staff of the Navy (disambiguation)
- Chief of the Naval Staff (disambiguation)
- Chief of Army (disambiguation)
- Chief of Air Force (disambiguation)
