= USS Orca (AVP-49) =

Tender of the United States Navy

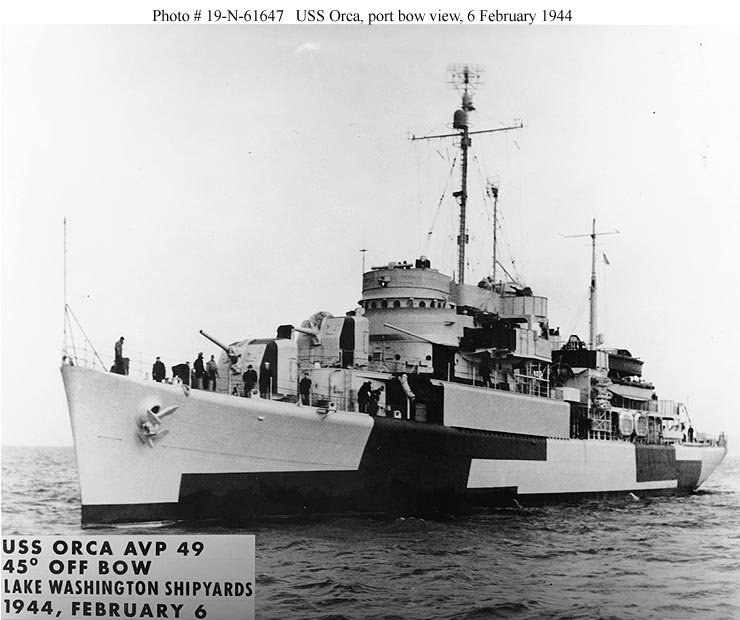
- USS Orca (AVP-49) off Houghton, Washington, on 6 February 1944, two weeks after commissioning

History

United States
- Name: USS Orca
- Namesake: Orca Bay in Alaska
- Builder: Lake Washington Shipyard, Houghton, Washington
- Laid down: 13 July 1942
- Launched: 4 October 1942
- Sponsored by: Mrs. J. W. Reeves, Jr.
- Commissioned: 23 January 1944
- Decommissioned: 31 October 1947
- Recommissioned: 15 December 1951
- Decommissioned: March 1960
- Honors and awards: Three battle stars for World War II service; Yellow "E" for excellence in the Air Department for fiscal year 1956
- Fate: Loaned to Ethiopia January 1962; Sold to Ethiopia March 1976

History

Ethiopian
- Name: Ethiopia (A-01)
- Namesake: The country of Ethiopia
- Acquired: January 1962 on loan; March 1976 by outright sale
- Commissioned: 1962
- Decommissioned: 1991
- Fate: Fled to Yemen May 1991; hulked there; Sold for scrapping 1993

General characteristics (seaplane carrier)
- Class & type: Barnegat-class small seaplane tender
- Displacement: 1,766 tons (light); 2,592 tons (trial)
- Length: 310 ft 9 in (94.72 m)
- Beam: 41 ft 2 in (12.55 m)
- Draft: 13 ft 6 in (4.11 m) (lim.)
- Installed power: 6,000 horsepower (4.48 megawatts)
- Propulsion: Diesel engine, two shafts
- Speed: 18.2 kn (33.7 km/h)
- Complement: 215 (ship's company); 367 (including aviation unit)
- Sensors & processing systems: Radar; sonar
- Armament: 3 × 5 in (130 mm) 38-caliber guns; 8 × 40 mm antiaircraft guns; 8 × 20 mm antiaircraft guns; 2 × depth charge tracks
- Aviation facilities: Supplies, spare parts, repairs, and berthing for one seaplane squadron; 80,000 US gallons (300,000 L) aviation fuel

General characteristics (training ship)
- Type: Training ship
- Displacement: 1,766 tons (light); 2,800 tons (full load)
- Length: 310 ft 8 in (94.69 m)
- Beam: 41 ft 0 in (12.50 m)
- Draft: 13 ft 5 in (4.09 m) (lim.)
- Installed power: 5,600 bhp (4,200 kW)
- Propulsion: Two Fairbanks-Morse 38D 8 1/8-10 diesel engines, two shafts
- Speed: 18.2 knots (33.7 km/h; 20.9 mph)
- Complement: 215 (ship's company as U.S. Navy seaplane tender); 367 (total accommodation as U.S. Navy seaplane tender)
- Sensors & processing systems: RCA SPS-12 air search radar; I-band navigation radar; RCA/General Electric Mark 26 I/J-band fire control radar
- Armament: 1 × 127-millimeter (5-inch) 38-caliber gun mount; 2 × twin 40-millimeter antiaircraft gun mounts; 1 × single 40-millimeter antiaircraft gun mount

The second USS Orca (AVP-49) was a United States Navy seaplane tender in commission from 1944 to 1947 and from 1951 to 1960. She saw service during the latter stages of World War II and during the Cold War. In 1962 she was loaned to Ethiopia, where she served in the Ethiopian Navy as the training ship Ethiopia (A-01) until 1991. She was the Ethiopian Navy's largest ship until she was sold for scrapping in 1993.

== Construction and commissioning ==
Orca was laid down on 13 July 1942 at Houghton, Washington, by the Lake Washington Shipyard. She was launched on 4 October 1942, sponsored by Mrs. J. W. Reeves Jr., and commissioned on 23 January 1944.

== United States Navy service ==
=== World War II ===
==== New Guinea campaign ====
After shakedown off San Diego, California, Orca sailed for Pearl Harbor, Hawaii, escorting the escort aircraft carrier USS Fanshaw Bay (CVE-70). Reporting to Commander, Naval Air Force, United States Seventh Fleet, she was ordered on to Hollandia, Dutch New Guinea, where she commenced operations with her first seaplane squadron on 26 May 1944.

Orca's squadrons carried out "Black Cat" night bombing and reconnaissance missions during the ensuing five months. These missions, in which black-painted Martin PBM Mariner flying boats conducted night bombing strikes against Japanese shipping, proved to be tremendously destructive to the Japanese. For them, the squadrons were awarded the Presidential Unit Citation and Commander Fleming, Orca's captain and commanding officer of the task unit that included the ship and her squadrons, was awarded the Legion of Merit. Orca's squadrons also carried out air-sea rescue missions in support of the United States Army's 13th Air Force.

==== Philippines campaign ====
In early November 1944, Orca moved into the Leyte Gulf area in the Philippines, as that campaign was reaching the critical stage. She sent her planes into Ormoc Bay right under the noses of the Japanese on 3 December 1944, and they taxied around the bay for nearly an hour picking up survivors of destroyer USS Cooper (DD-695), sunk the previous night. After the Japanese finally realized what was taking place, they threw up quite a fusillade. The pilots bore down on the throttles and headed for the open sea. Heavily loaded, the old Martin PBM Mariners finally heaved themselves into the air, after about a three-nautical-mile (5.6 km) run. Making additional trips, they were able to rescue 167 Cooper survivors.

Orca was attacked by a lone plane on 27 August 1944, but her guns drove it off. That next night, the Japanese radio propagandist Tokyo Rose announced that "The volume of ack-ack which met the previous night's raid indicated that a battleship of the Wisconsin class had been sighted at Middleburg Island."

Orca came under similar attack twice on 26 November 1944, and was credited with an assist on a plane which narrowly missed motor torpedo boat tender USS Oyster Bay (AGP-6).

On 6 January 1945, kamikaze suicide planes attacked Orca's convoy formation. In the attack, a minesweeper was destroyed and Orca was slightly damaged as a plane crashed close alongside, showering her with wreckage and bomb fragments and wounding six of her gun crew. Tokyo Rose overstated the attack's results by announcing that the kamikaze "special attack group" had sunk one battleship and one heavy cruiser and seriously damaged three other cruisers in a large convoy moving north along the coast of Mindoro.

Orca continued to service air squadrons and carry out rescue missions until the end of World War II on 15 August 1945.

==== Honors and awards ====
Orca earned three battle stars for service in World War II. She also was commended, along with her squadrons, by United States Army General Walter Krueger, U. S. Sixth Army commander, for landing scouts behind Japanese lines, carrying supplies to Philippine guerrilla forces, and evacuating wounded personnel during the Philippines campaign.

=== Post-World War II, 1945-1947 ===
On 26 September 1945, Orca arrived at Okinawa to assist in the occupation of Japan. She was soon detached to proceed to the United States.

Orca's next big assignment was furnishing services for Operation Crossroads, the Bikini Atoll atomic bomb tests in 1946. Orca then was decommissioned on 31 October 1947 and joined the reserve fleet in San Francisco, California.

=== 1951-1960 ===
Orca was recommissioned on 15 December 1951 and operated out of San Diego through 1952 under the command of Commander A. K. Espenas. On 5 January 1953 she was underway for the Philippines.

On 2 August 1954, Orca relieved the destroyer escort USS Walton (DE-361) at Hong Kong as station ship. By 25 February 1955 she was back in San Diego for leave and upkeep.

Orca deployed to the Western Pacific on 11 July 1955 for another tour of duty in which she weathered two severe typhoons. She returned to the United States again on 1 December 1955 and was able to spend her first Christmas in four years at home. Her leave period was extended to 15 January 1956.

Following extensive training during the early months of 1956, Orca deployed to the Western Pacific for a seven-month tour on 24 April 1956. During this deployment, she was awarded the Yellow "E" for excellence in the Air Department for fiscal year 1956. She returned to San Diego on 19 November 1956.

Orca made a subsequent Western Pacific cruise beginning 22 August 1956 and continued to provide service to the United States Pacific Fleet until she decommissioned again in March 1960 and went into reserve on the Columbia River in Oregon.

== Ethiopian Navy service ==
In January 1962, Orca was loaned to Ethiopia under the Military Assistance Program and was commissioned in the Imperial Ethiopian Navy as the training ship Ethiopia (A-01). Sold outright to Ethiopia in March 1976, Ethiopia was the Ethiopian Navy's largest ship from her arrival in 1962 until her scrapping in 1993.

In May 1991, at the end of the Eritrean War of Independence, the independence of Eritrea made Ethiopia a landlocked country. With all Ethiopian Navy bases coming under hostile Eritrean control, Ethiopia was among ten Ethiopian Navy ships to escape to Yemen.

=== Final disposition ===
Never again operational after arriving in Yemen in May 1991, Ethiopia survived as a hulk there until she was sold for scrap in 1993. In 1996, the Ethiopian Navy itself was disestablished.
