= Chief of the Defence Staff =

Chief of (the) Defence Staff may refer to:

- Chief of the Defence Staff (Canada)
- Chief of the Defence Staff (France)
- Chief of the Defence Staff (The Gambia)
- Chief of the Defence Staff (Ghana)
- Chief of Defence Staff (India)
- Chief of the Defence Staff (Italy)
- Chief of Defence Staff (Jamaica)
- Chief of Defence Staff (Nigeria)
- Chief of Defence Staff (Rwanda)
- Chief of the Defence Staff (Sierra Leone)
- Chief of the Defence Staff (Spain)
- Chief of the Defence Staff (Sri Lanka)
- Chief of Defence Staff (Sweden)
- Chief of Defence Staff (Trinidad and Tobago)
- Chief of the Defence Staff (United Kingdom)

== See also ==
- Defence Staff (disambiguation)
- Chairman of the Joint Chiefs of Staff (disambiguation)
  - Chairman of the Joint Chiefs of Staff (United States)
- Chief of the Air Staff (disambiguation)
- Chief of Staff of the Air Force (disambiguation)
- Chief of the Armed Forces (disambiguation)
- Chief of Army Staff (disambiguation)
- Chief of the Defence Force (disambiguation)
- Chief of Staff of the Armed Forces (disambiguation)
- Chief of the General Staff
- Chief of the Naval Staff (disambiguation)
- Chief of Staff of the Navy (disambiguation)
