= Defence Staff =

Defence Staff may refer to:

- Defence Staff (Denmark)
- Defence Staff (Lithuania)
- Defence Staff (Spain)
- Defence Staff (Sweden)
- Defence Staff (Uruguay)

== See also ==
- Chief of the Defence Staff (disambiguation)
