= Chief of Air Force =

The Chief of Air Force may refer to:

- Chief of Air Force (Australia)
- Chief of the Royal Danish Air Force
- Chief of Air Force (Malaysia)
- Chief of Air Force (New Zealand)
- Chief of the Air Force (Philippines)
- Chief of the Air Force (Somalia)
- Chief of Air Force (Sweden)
- Chief of Air Force (Singapore)
- Chief of the Air Force (Zimbabwe)

== See also ==
- Chief of the Air Staff (disambiguation)
- Commander of the Air Force (disambiguation)
- Chief of Army (disambiguation)
- Chief of Navy (disambiguation)
