= General Staff (disambiguation) =

A General Staff is a group of officers, enlisted and civilian staff who serve as the commanding body of a country's armed forces.

Specific General Staff include:

- Albanian General Staff
- German General Staff
- General Staff (Denmark)
- General Staff (Sweden)
- General Staff (Switzerland)
- General Staff of the Israel Defense Forces
- General Staff of the Defense Forces of Georgia
- General Staff of Armed Forces (Kyrgyzstan)
- Polish General Staff
- General Staff of the Armed Forces of the Russian Federation
- Serbian General Staff
- General Staff of the Ukrainian Armed Forces
- General Staff of the Turkish Armed Forces
- General Staff of the Vietnam People's Army
- Imperial General Staff of the United Kingdom

== See also ==
- Chief of the General Staff
