= Commander of the Defence Force =

Commander of the Defence Force may refer to:

- Commander of the Defence Force (The Bahamas)
- Commander of the Defence Force (Belize)
- Commander of the Defence Force (Botswana)
- Commander of the Ceylon Defence Force
- Commander of the Defence Forces (Estonia)
- Commander of the Defence Forces (Hungary)
- Commander of the Lesotho Defence Force
- Commander of the Papua New Guinea Defence Force

== See also ==
- Defence Force (disambiguation)
- Chief of the Defence Force (disambiguation)
