= Chief of the Naval Staff =

Chief of the Naval Staff is the formal title for the office of:

- Chief of Naval Staff (Bangladesh)
- Chief of Naval Staff (Ghana)
- Chief of the Naval Staff (India)
- Chief of the Naval Staff (Nigeria)
- Chief of the Naval Staff (Pakistan)
- Chief of the Naval Staff (Portugal)
- Chief of the Naval Staff (Sweden)

== See also ==
- Chief of Army Staff (disambiguation)
- Chief of Navy (disambiguation)
- Chief of Staff of the Navy (disambiguation)
- Chief of the Air Staff (disambiguation)
- Chief of the Defence Staff (disambiguation)
- Chief of the General Staff
