= Army Staff =

Army Staff may refer to:

- Army Staff (Denmark)
- Army Staff (Sweden)
- Army Staff (Germany)
- Army Staff (Italy)
- United States Department of the Army

== See also ==
- Chief of Army Staff (disambiguation)
