= Commander of the Armed Forces =

Commander of the Armed Forces may refer to:

- Commander of the Armed Forces (Brunei)
- Commander of the Indonesian National Armed Forces
- Commander of the Lebanese Armed Forces
- Commander of the Armed Forces of Malta
- Commander of the Armed Forces (Paraguay)
- Commander of the Armed Forces (Suriname)

== See also ==
- Commander of the Army (disambiguation)
- Chief of the Armed Forces (disambiguation)
