= Chief of Army =

Chief of Army may refer to:

- Chief of Army (Australia)
- Chief of the Royal Danish Army
- Chief of Army (Malaysia)
- Chief of Army (New Zealand)
- Chief of the Nepalese Army
- Chief of the Army (Philippines)
- Chief of Army (Singapore)
- Chief of Army (Sweden)

== See also ==
- Chief of the Army Staff (disambiguation)
- Commander of the Army (disambiguation)
- Chief of Air Force (disambiguation)
- Chief of Navy (disambiguation)
