= Somali Navy =

Naval warfare branch of Somalia's military

- Ciidamada Badda Soomaaliya
- Founded: 10 February 1964
- Size: Hundreds (?)
- Part of: Somali Armed Forces
- Mottos: Somali: Isku Tiirsada! English: Lean on each other!
- Colors of the Navy: Blue, Gold Black (beret colour)
- Anniversaries: 1 July (Independence Day); 12 April (Armed Forces Day)

Commanders
- Chief of the Navy: Commodore Abdiwahab Abdullahi Omar
- Notable commanders: Vice Admiral Mohammed Omar Osman; Colonel Mohamed Isse Lacle; Rear Admiral Farah Qare

Insignia
- Naval ensign

The Somali Navy (Somali: Ciidamada Badda Soomaaliyeed, Arabic: القوات البحرية الصومالية, romanized: al-Quwwat al-Bahriyah as-Sumaliyah, lit. 'Somali Navy Force') is the naval warfare service branch of the Somali Armed Forces. There was a long period of inactivity following the collapse of the central government, however in 2021 Reuters published photos showing a total of three small patrol craft operating in Mogadishu harbor. In 2024, after the Ethiopia-Somaliland MOU, Turkey and Somalia signed an agreement by which Turkey would provide maritime security support to Somalia, and at the same time carry out oil drilling exploration off the Somali coast.

== History ==
The Somali Navy was founded in 1964 with the help of Soviet military advisers. It had its bases in Berbera, on the Gulf of Aden and Kismayo on the Indian Ocean near the border with Kenya. It also operated a radar facility in Merca. Initial deliveries included Soviet-made Project 368P and Project 183 patrol and torpedo boats. In 1977, Siad Barre terminated the Treaty of Friendship and Cooperation with Moscow and expelled all Soviet military advisers from Somalia due to their intervention in the Ogaden War.

In 1990 the naval inventory included two Soviet Osa-II missile-armed fast attack craft, four Soviet Mol PFT torpedo-armed fast attack craft, and several patrol craft. The navy also possessed a Soviet Polnocny-class landing ship capable of carrying five tanks and 120 soldiers, and four smaller landing craft.

The Navy dissolved as Barre's regime fell in 1990–91; there have been reports that some vessels took refuge in Aden.

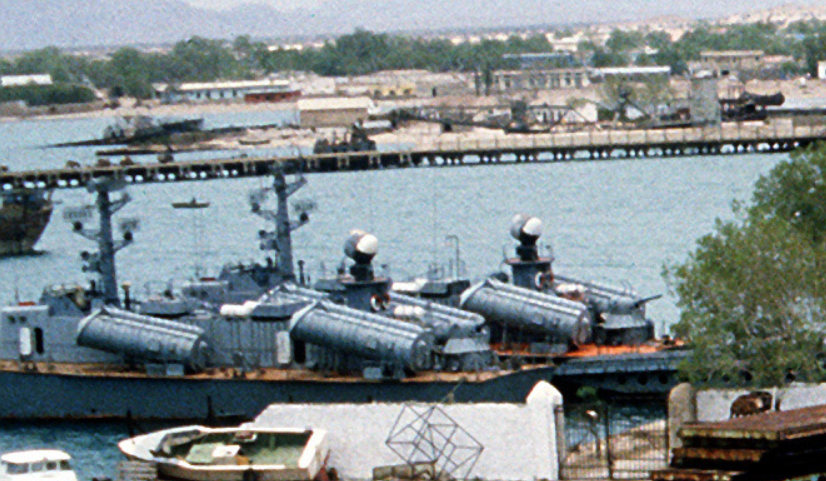
Two Somali Navy missile boats in August 1983.

=== Re-establishment ===
In June 2009, the Somali navy was re-established with a new commander appointed: Admiral Farah Omar Ahmed.

Up to 500 naval personnel were training in Mogadishu, with their training expected to finish in December 2009. They were reported as the first batch of a 5000 strong navy force. Admiral Farrah Ahmed Omaar told a New Yorker reporter in December 2009 that the navy was 'practically nothing' at the time, though five hundred new recruits were in training.

It was said by Admiral Omar that the recruits were being paid $60 per month.

A Somali delegation visiting Turkey in August 2011 submitted a request for two search-and-rescue ships and six coast guard boats. Worth some 250 million euros, if approved, the request might have turned the new Somali navy into a stronger naval force, capable of curbing piracy and protecting its coastline.

In August 2011 a Transitional Federal Government-Puntland cooperative agreement called for the creation of a Somali Marine Force.

On 30 June 2012, the United Arab Emirates announced a contribution of $1 million toward enhancing Somalia's naval security. Boats, equipment and communication gear necessary for the rebuilding of the coast guard would be bought. A central operations naval command was also planned to be set up in Mogadishu.

On 23 January 2020, it was announced that the Turkish Naval Forces donated several patrol vessels and amphibious vessels to the Somali Navy as a form of military aid to Somalia and to carry on its commitment to the nations joint task force.

In July 2020, it was reported that China and the Somali Navy were planning to conduct joint naval patrols in the waters including Somaliland’s coast.

In February 2024, Somalia and Turkey signed a Defense and Economic Cooperation Framework Agreement. It grants Turkey a 10-year mandate to support Somalia's maritime security efforts, including the training and equipping of the Somali navy to protect its Exclusive Economic Zone from piracy, illegal fishing, toxic dumping, terrorism, and foreign interference. The agreement stipulates that Turkey will receive 30% of the revenue from the economic zone known for its abundant marine resources.

In June 2025, Turkey delivered two unnamed utility helicopters for the Somali Navy. Pictures surfaced online shortly after the delivery showing Turkish Eurocopter AS532 Cougar helicopters at Aden Abdulle airport in Mogadishu.

In July 2025, General Abduwahaab Omer, Commander of the Somali Navy, held a meeting in Ankara with Admiral Ercüment Tatlioğlu, Commander of the Turkish Naval Forces. The meeting focused on strategic plans to develop and equip Somalia’s Navy and Coastal Defense Forces, aiming to deepen maritime security cooperation between the two countries. General Abduwahaab Omar presented Somalia’s naval needs, while Admiral Ercüment Tatlioğlu showcased Türkiye’s military equipment and capabilities. The meeting focused on potential purchases and future cooperation in training and naval development.

=== Naval base and training facility ===
In early 2026, the Federal Government of Somalia and the Republic of Turkey began implementing elements of their bilateral defence cooperation by establishing a new Somali Navy training base near the coastal town of Adale in the Middle Shabelle region. The facility, reported to have been established near the coastal town of Adale, serves as a training site for Somali naval personnel under Somalia-Turkey defence cooperation. According to local media reports, training activities and the delivery of equipment are underway as part of the broader implementation of the bilateral agreement.

== Ships and equipment ==
=== Current equipment ===
Type	Description	Country of Manufacture	Inventory
Patrol boat
ONUK MRTP Class 16	Patrol boat	Turkey	11
Rigid Inflatable Boat
Grand RIB	Rigid inflatable boat	Ukraine	8

=== Inventory circa 1970s ===
The following was the Somali Navy's major equipment:

Type	Description	Country of Manufacture	Inventory
Missile boat
Osa-II missile-armed fast attack craft	Missile boat	Soviet Union	2
Mol PFT torpedo-armed fast attack craft	Missile boat	Soviet Union	4
Patrol boats
Poluchat-class patrol boats	Patrol torpedo boat	Soviet Union	5

== Ranks and uniform ==
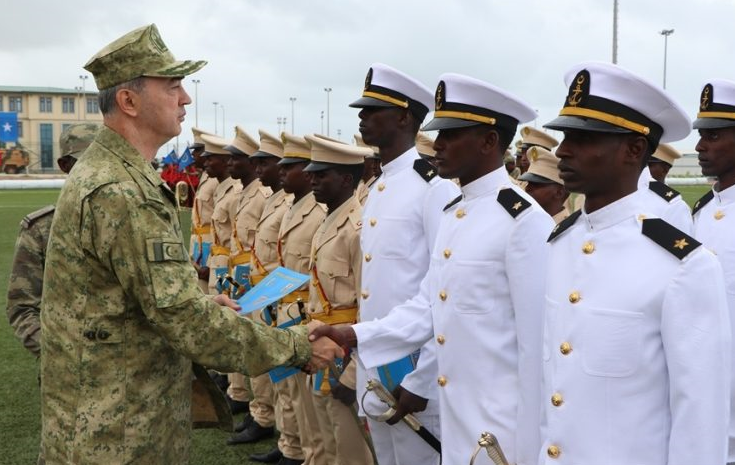
Somali junior officers in formal uniform with ceremonial swords graduate from TURKSOM Naval Academy in 2018

Somali Navy personnel wear camouflage uniforms but with black shoulder boards to identify them. They also wear black berets to identify them as such, their service uniform is white, and they traditionally wear black ties alongside a white blazer, shirt, trousers, belts and if their rank allows, golden laces on their dress uniforms and black laces on their regular service dress and black gorget patches with more golden ornate design for flag officers and black formal shoes, however in more recent years, a high collar variant is worn by more junior officers who graduate from Camp TURKSOM's Navy Academy, also Rear Admirals and Commodore Admirals may have a red stripe at the bottom of their shoulder boards (similarly to those in the Yemeni Navy) to identify them as staff officers, also the Navy also utilises sleeve rank insignia. There is also khaki uniforms utilised by the Navy with them retaining the black shoulder boards, lace and berets, although officers may wear a peaked cap.

=== Ranks ===
Rank group	General / flag officers			Senior officers			Junior officers
Somali Navy
Somali Navy	Admiraal guud	Admiraal gaas	Admiraal guuto	Gashaanle sare	Gashaanle dhexe	Gashaanle	Dhamme	Laba xídígle	Xídígle

Rank group	Senior NCOs					Junior NCOs		Enlisted
Somali Navy								No insignia
Somali Navy	Musharax sarkaal	Sadex xarígle	Laba xarígle	Xarígle	Sadex alífle	Laba alífle	Alífle	Dable

== See also ==
- Chief of the Navy
