= Chief of the Air Staff =

Chief of the Air Staff (CAS), Air Force Chief of Staff or Chief of Air Force, is the appointment held by the most senior officer in several nations' air forces. This appointment may refer to:

- Chief of Air Staff (Bangladesh)
- Chief of Air Staff (Ghana)
- Chief of the Air Staff (India)
- Chief of the Air Staff (Nigeria)
- Chief of the Air Staff (Pakistan)
- Chief of the Air Staff (Sweden)
- Chief of the Air Staff (United Kingdom)

== See also ==
- Air Staff (disambiguation)
- Chief of Air Force (disambiguation)
- Chief of Staff of the Air Force (disambiguation)
- Chief of Army Staff (disambiguation)
- Chief of the Defence Staff (disambiguation)
- Chief of the General Staff
- Chief of the Naval Staff (disambiguation)
