= Chief of Staff of the Armed Forces =

Chief of Staff of the Armed Forces may refer to:

- Chief of Staff of the Armed Forces of the Democratic Republic of the Congo
- Chief of Staff of the Armed Forces (Cape Verde)
- Chief of Staff of the Armed Forces (Egypt)
- Chief of Staff of the Armed Forces (Eritrea)
- Chief of Staff of the Armed Forces (Liberia)
- Chief of Staff of the Armed Forces of the Philippines
- Chief of Staff of the Armed Forces (São Tomé and Príncipe)

== See also ==
- Chief of the Defence Forces (disambiguation)
- Chief of the Armed Forces (disambiguation)
