= Chief of the Navy (Somalia) =

Position in the Navy of Somalia

- Taliyaha Ciidanka Badda Soomaaliyeed
- Coat of arms of the Somali Navy

- Ensign of the Navy

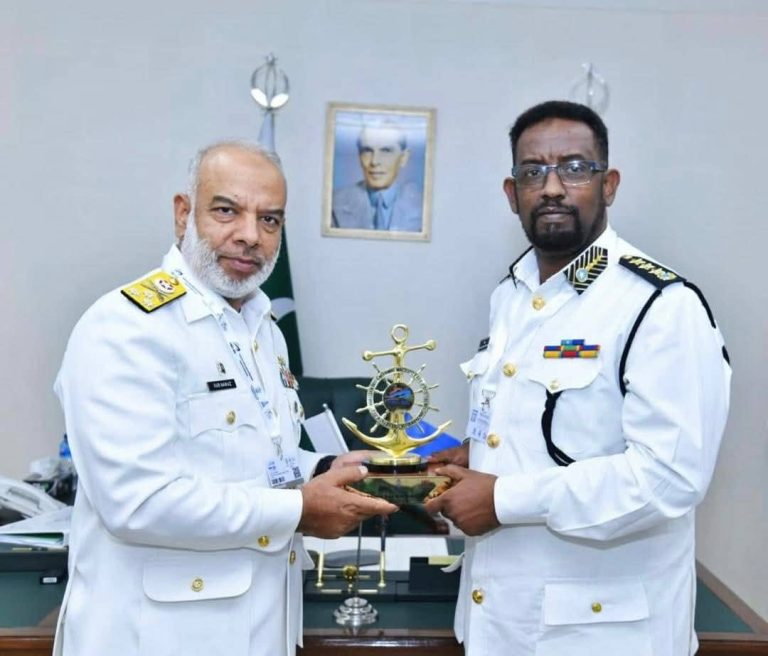
- Incumbent; Brigadier General Abdiwahab Abdullahi Omar since April 2025
- Ministry of Defense and Somali Armed Forces
- Style: Jaale
- Member of: Ministry of Defense
- Reports to: Prime Minister of Somalia: Minister of Defence (Somalia); Chief of Armed Forces
- Appointer: Chief of Armed Forces
- Formation: 1965
- First holder: Vice Admiral Mohammed Omar Osman

The Chief of the Navy (Somali: Taaliyaha Ciidamada Badda Somaaliyeed) is the head of the Naval operations and the administrative head in the Somali Navy, and is under the Chief of Armed Forces and the Ministry of Defence (Somalia). The current Chief of the Navy is Brigadier General Abdiwahab Abdullahi Omar.

== Chiefs of the Navy ==
Somali Republic and Somali Democratic Republic (1960-1991)

No.	Portrait	Chief of Staff of the Navy	Took office	Left office	Time in office	Ref.
1	Mohammed Omar Osman	Jaale; Vice Admiral; Mohammed Omar Osman (born 1940)	circa. 1974	1991	17 years	

Transitional Government and Federal Republic of Somalia (2012 - present)

No.	Portrait	Chief of Staff of the Navy	Took office	Left office	Time in office	Ref.
1	Farah Qare	Rear Admiral; Farah Qare	?	?	?	
2	Madeey Ufurow	Commodore Admiral; Madeey Ufurow	?	?	?	
3	Hassan Nur	Commodore Admiral; Hassan Nur	?	December 2018	?	
4	Abaas Amiin Ali	Rear Admiral; Abaas Amiin Ali	December 2018	June 2020	1 year, 6 months	
5	Abdihamid Mohamed Dirir	Commodore Admiral; Abdihamid Mohamed Dirir	June 2020	Incumbent	6 years, 4 months	
