= Armed forces (disambiguation) =

Armed forces are the military of a nation.

Armed forces may also refer to:

- Armed Forces (album), an Elvis Costello album
- Armed Forces (Special Powers) Act, acts created by the Parliament of India
- Armed Forces (sports society) (Вооруженные Силы), one of the largest sporting organisations in the Soviet Union
