= Commander of the Army (Mexico) =

Government position in Mexico

Commander of the Mexican Army
- Comandante del Ejército Mexicano (Spanish)
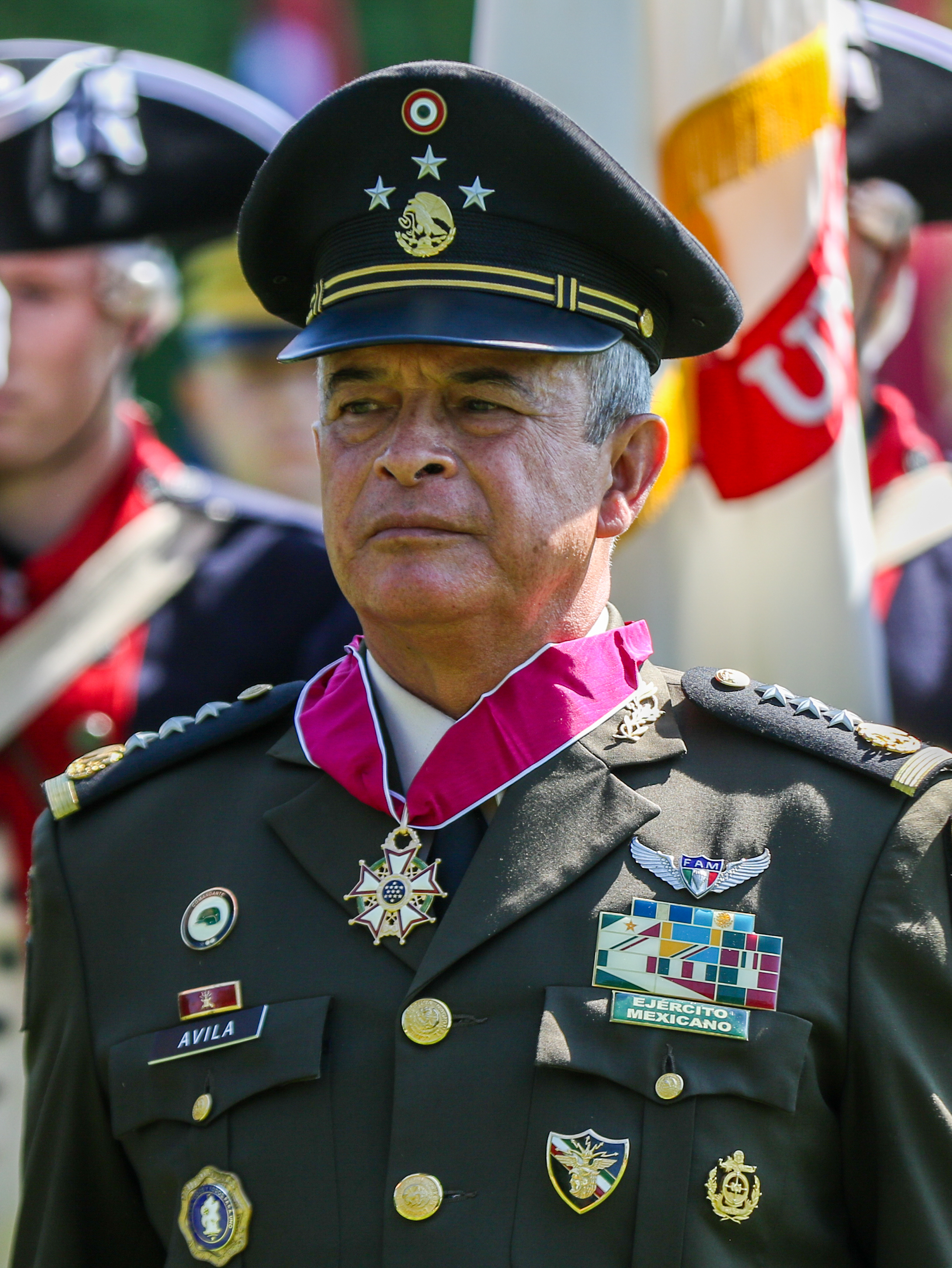
- Incumbent; Celestino Ávila Astudillo since 4 July 2022
- Mexican Army
- Reports to: Chief of the National Defense Staff
- Appointer: Secretary of National Defense
- Formation: 13 August 2020; 6 years ago
- First holder: Eufemio Alberto Ibarra Flores
- Website: Official website

The Commander of the Mexican Army (Spanish: Comandante del Ejército Mexicano) is the professional head of the Mexican Army. The position was established following major reforms to the Mexican Armed Forces in 2020.

== List of officeholders ==
No.	Portrait	Name (Birth–Death)	Term of office			Ref.
No.	Portrait	Name (Birth–Death)	Took office	Left office	Time in office	Ref.
1		Divisional general Eufemio Alberto Ibarra Flores (born )	13 August 2020	4 July 2022	1 year, 325 days	
2		Divisional general Celestino Ávila Astudillo (born 1975)	4 July 2022	Incumbent	4 years, 65 days	
