= Air Staff =

Air Staff may refer to:

- Staff (military), a body of senior officers in a military service:
  - Air Staff (Sweden), former body of senior officers that ran the Swedish Air Force
  - Air Staff (United Kingdom), the body of senior officers that runs the Royal Air Force
  - Air Staff (United States), the body of senior officers that runs the United States Air Force

== See also ==
- Chief of the Air Staff (disambiguation)
