= Chief of the General Staff =

The Chief of the General Staff (CGS) is a post in many armed forces (militaries), the head of the military staff.

== List ==
- Chief of the General Staff (Abkhazia)
- Chief of General Staff (Afghanistan)
- Chief of the General Staff (Albania)
- Chief of the General Staff (Armenia)
- Chief of the General Staff (Australia)
- Chief of the General Staff (Austria)
- Chief of General Staff of Azerbaijani Armed Forces
- Chief of the General Staff (Kingdom of Bavaria)
- Chief of the General Staff (Bulgaria)
- Chief of the General Staff (Bangladesh)
- Chief of the General Staff (Canada)
- Chief of the General Staff (Chad)
- Chief of the General Staff (China)
- Chief of the General Staff (Croatia)
- Chief of the General Staff (Czech Republic)
- Chief of the General Staff (Czechoslovakia)
- Chief of the General Staff (Denmark)
- Chief of the General Staff (Egypt)
- Chief of General Staff (Ethiopia)
- Chief of General Staff (Georgia)
- Chief of the General Staff (Germany)
- Chief of the General Staff (Guatemala)
- Chief of the General Staff (Hungary)
- Chief of the General Staff (India)
- Chief of the General Staff (Israel)
- Chief of the General Staff (Iraq)
- Chief of the General Staff (Kazakhstan)
- Chief of the General Staff (Kenya)
- Chief of the General Staff (Kyrgyzstan)
- Chief of the General Staff (Kuwait)
- Chief of the General Staff (Lithuania)
- Chief of the General Staff (North Macedonia)
- Chief of the General Staff (Moldova)
- Chief of the General Staff (Montenegro)
- Chief of General Staff (Mozambique)
- Chief of the General Staff (North Korea)
- Chief of the General Staff (Pakistan)
- Chief of the General Staff (Poland)
- Chief of the General Staff (Portugal)
- Chief of the General Staff (Prussia)
- Chief of the General Staff (Russia)
- Chief of the General Staff (Romania)
- Chief of the General Staff (Senegal)
- Chief of the General Staff (Serbia)
- Chief of the General Staff (Slovakia)
- Chief of the General Staff (Slovenia)
- Chief of the General Staff (Somaliland)
- Chief of Staff of the Republic of Korea Army (South Korea)
- Chief of the General Staff (Sweden)
- Chief of the General Staff (Syria)
- Chief of the General Staff (Taiwan)
- Chief of the General Staff (Tajikistan)
- Chief of the General Staff (Transnistria)
- Chief of the General Staff (Turkey)
- Chief of the General Staff (Turkmenistan)
- Chief of the General Staff (Ukraine)
- Chief of the General Staff (United Kingdom)
  - Deputy Chief of the General Staff (United Kingdom)
- Chief of Staff of the United States Army (United States)
- Chief of the General Staff (Uzbekistan)
- Chief of the General Staff (Vietnam)
- Chief of the General Staff (Yugoslavia)

== See also ==
- General Staff (disambiguation)
- Chief of staff
- Chief of Army Staff
- Chief of the Air Staff
- Chief of the Armed Forces
- Chief of the Defence Staff
- Chief of the Naval Staff
