= Ethiopian Navy =

Former naval military force of Ethiopia and Eritrea (1955–1996)

- የኢትዮጵያ ባሕር ኀይል
- Active: 1955–1996; 2019–present
- Country: Ethiopia
- Type: Navy
- Size: 11,500 personnel (in 1991); 81 ships
- Part of: Ethiopian National Defense Force
- Headquarters: Bahir Dar (2019–present); Addis Ababa (1990–1996); Massawa (1955–1990)
- Engagements: Ethiopian Civil War; Eritrean War of Independence

Commanders
- Supreme Commander: President Taye Atske Selassie
- Commander-in-chief: Prime Minister Abiy Ahmed
- Chief of General Staff: Field Marshal General Birhanu Jula
- Deputy Chief of General Staff: General Abebaw Tadesse
- Chief of the Navy: Vice Admiral Kindu Gezu
- Deputy Chief of the Navy: Rear Admiral Nasir Abadiga

Insignia
- Naval Ensign (1955–1974)

- Naval Ensign (1974–1975)

- Naval Ensign (1975–1996)

- Naval Ensign (2019–present)

Aircraft flown
- Helicopter: UH-1 Iroquois; Mil Mi-8 or Mil Mi-14

The Ethiopian Navy (Amharic: የኢትዮጵያ ባሕር ኀይል, romanized: ye’ītiyop’iya baḥiri ḫayil), known as the Imperial Ethiopian Navy until 1974, is the naval branch of the Ethiopian National Defense Force founded in 1955. It was disestablished in 1996 after the independence of Eritrea in 1993, which left Ethiopia landlocked. However, the Ethiopian Navy was re-established in 2019 as a brown water navy and is based in Lake Tana in Bahir Dar, Amhara region.

== Imperial Ethiopian Navy (1955–1974) ==
=== Founding of the navy ===
Ethiopia regained a coastline and ports and army on the Red Sea in 1950 when the United Nations decided to federate Eritrea with Ethiopia. In 1955, the Imperial Ethiopian Navy was founded, and its first (and primary) base was established at Massawa in 1956. The navy took delivery of its first ship in 1957. By the early 1960s, workshops and other facilities were under construction at Massawa to give it complete naval base capabilities.

=== Organization ===
In 1958, the navy became a fully independent service, organized as one of the three Ethiopian armed services—alongside the Ethiopian Army and Ethiopian Air Force—under the overall command of the Chief of Staff of the Imperial Armed Forces. The navy's deputy commander had his naval headquarters in Addis Ababa. The navy was conceived and built as a coastal navy for patrolling the Red Sea coast.

=== Training and education ===
The Imperial Ethiopian Navy's personnel were among the best trained in the world. Even before Ethiopia took control of Eritrea, the British Royal Navy had seconded Ethiopian personnel to its bases in Eritrea to provide them with naval training. A naval college, where Ethiopian naval officers undertook a 52-month program of study, was founded at Asmara in 1956; each class admitted averaged 30 to 40 students in size, and they graduated with a naval commission and a Bachelor of Science degree. In 1957, a Naval Non-Commissioned Officer School was established at Massawa as well. A Frogman/Diving School for the training of a special commando unit and a Ratings' Training Establishment for the training of naval enlisted men also were established at Massawa by the late 1950s or early 1960s. Centers to provide enlisted men with training in technical specialities were established at Aseb, Asmara, and Massawa.

Emperor Haile Selassie I appointed 25 Royal Norwegian Navy officers to help in organizing Ethiopia's new navy, and they oversaw much of the training. Retired British Royal Navy officers also served as trainers and advisers during Haile Selassie's reign. Some Imperial Ethiopian Navy officers received naval education at the Italian Naval Academy in Livorno, Italy, while others attended the United States Naval Academy in Annapolis, Maryland.

=== Forces ===
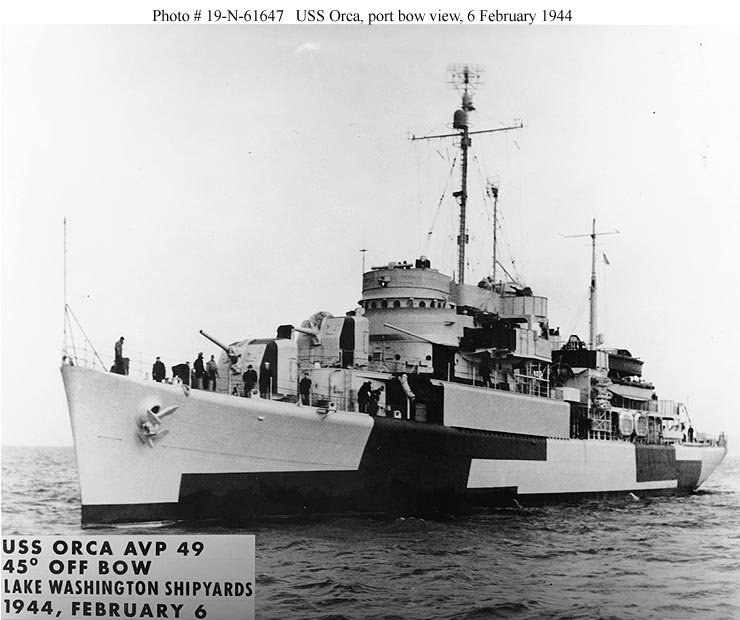
The United States Navy seaplane tender USS Orca (AVP-49) off Houghton, Washington, on 6 February 1944. She served in the Ethiopian Navy as the training ship Ethiopia from 1962 to 1993 and was its largest ship.

==== Personnel ====
By 1958, the Imperial Ethiopian Navy had 129 personnel, increasing to 1,200 in 1970. At its peak, the Imperial Ethiopian Navy had a force of 11,500 personnel. All enlisted men served seven-year enlistments as volunteers.

==== Ships ====
The navy operated a mix of patrol boats, torpedo boats, and small submersible boats transferred from the United States Navy and the navies of European countries.

The Imperial Ethiopian Navy's first ship was a former U.S. Navy PC-1604-class submarine chaser, ex-USS PC-1616, transferred to Ethiopia on 2 January 1957 via a loan scheme involving Italy and transferred to Italy on 3 May 1959. The Ethiopian ship was named after Zerai Deres, famous national patriot considered a folk hero.

In 1962, the United States transferred the former seaplane tender USS Orca (AVP-49) to Ethiopia; renamed Ethiopia (A-01) and placed in service as a training ship, she was the Ethiopian Navy's largest ship throughout her 31 years of service.

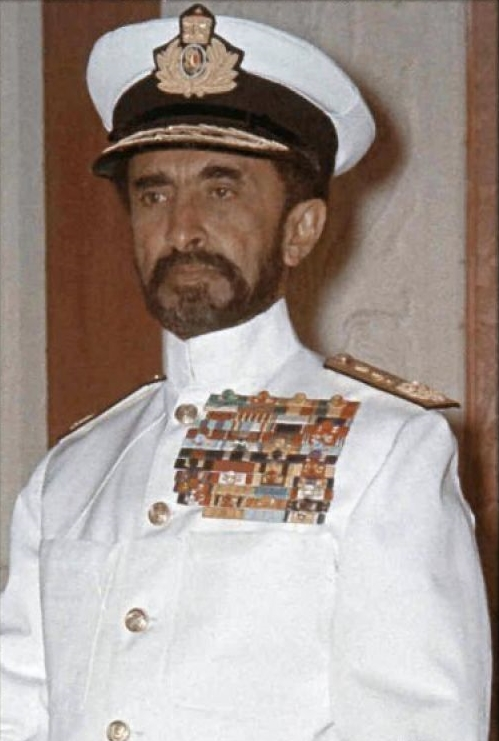
Haile Selassie in the uniform of the Ethiopian Navy.

=== Bases ===
The Imperial Ethiopian Navy established four bases: Massawa was the site of the naval headquarters and enlisted training facilities; the naval air station and naval academy were at Asmara; Assab was the site of a naval station, enlisted training facilities, and a repair dock; and there was a naval station and communications station on the Dahlak Islands in the Red Sea near Massawa.

== Communist era (1974–1991) ==
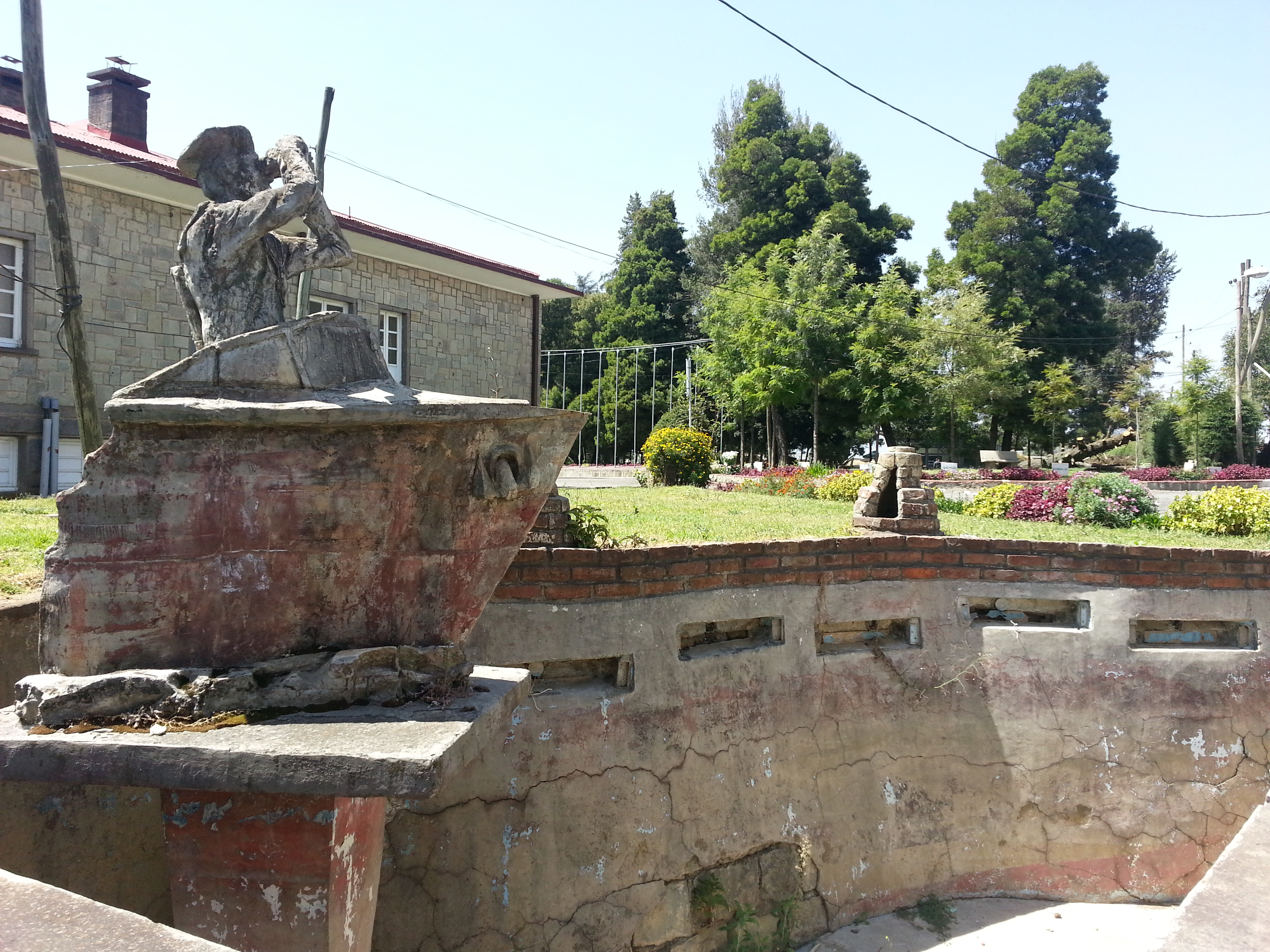
Monument at the former headquarters of the Ethiopian Navy in 2012

Haile Selassie was deposed in 1974, and during the Communist-run governments of the Provisional Military Administrative Council or Derg of 1974 to 1977 and of Mengistu Haile Mariam that followed from 1977 to 1991, the Ethiopian Navy—no longer "Imperial"—was reoriented toward the Soviet Union. Officers continued to train in Ethiopia, but selected naval officers continued their studies at the Soviet naval academy in Leningrad and at Baku. After the Soviet Union changed their alliance from Somalia to Ethiopia in the Ogaden War in 1978, it established naval bases at Assab and on the Dahlak Islands and began to base Soviet Naval Aviation aircraft at Asmara International Airport; in addition, Soviet naval personnel took posts as instructors at the Ethiopian naval academy. Enlisted men continued to train at Massawa and served a seven-year enlistment. In 1982, the Ethiopian Navy had about 1,500 personnel.

The turn to the Soviet Union meant that the navy became a largely Soviet-equipped force. Although Ethiopia continued in her role as a training ship and remained Ethiopia's largest naval vessel, the United States ceased arms sales to Ethiopia in 1977, and Soviet-built patrol boats and missile boats began to replace other ships. By 1991, the Ethiopian Navy had two frigates, eight missile craft, six torpedo craft, six patrol boats, two amphibious craft, and two support and training craft, mostly of Soviet origin.

After the Derg seized power, the navy's six UH-1 helicopters were transferred to the Ethiopian Air Force. At some point, the post-Imperial navy reportedly acquired two Soviet-made—perhaps Mil Mi-8 (NATO reporting name "Hip") or Mil Mi-14 (NATO reporting name "Haze")—helicopters. The navy also operated a coastal defense brigade equipped with two truck-mounted P-15 Termit (USDoD designation "SSC-3"; NATO reporting name "Styx") coastal defense antiship cruise missile launchers.

=== Role in the Ethiopian Civil War and Eritrean War of Independence ===
Eritrean opposition to Eritrea's inclusion in Ethiopia broke out in a full-scale rebellion after the Derg took power in 1974, and this left the Ethiopian Navy in the difficult position of having all of its bases deep in rebel territory and on the front line of the Eritrean War of Independence. In April 1977, the navy lost the Cape-class patrol boat P-11, with reports blaming the loss both on a storm and on an attack by the Eritrean People's Liberation Front (EPLF) during the First Battle of Massawa. If she was lost to EPLF action, P-11 was the only Ethiopian Navy ship ever lost in combat.

The Ethiopian Navy contributed nothing to Ethiopia's victory over Somalia in the Ogaden War of 1978, and Mengistu increasingly began to divert resources from the navy to the Ethiopian Army and Ethiopian Air Force. As a result, the Ethiopian Navy began to decline further in its capabilities.

The Ethiopian Navy lost both its main port and its highway connection to the Ethiopian interior when the EPLF captured Massawa during the Second Battle of Massawa in February 1990, forcing the navy's headquarters to move inland to Addis Ababa. The Eritrean rebellion spread to the Dahlak Islands, where the EPLF damaged the Petya II-class frigate F-1616 beyond repair. EPLF successes left Ethiopian Navy bases increasingly isolated as 1990 wore on. By the spring of 1991, the navy's ships had begun to use ports in Djibouti, Saudi Arabia, and Yemen because of the danger of returning to their home bases. In late May 1991, the EPLF captured Asmara and surrounded Assab, where fire from its ground forces sank seven Ethiopian Navy ships in port. On 25 May 1991, the 14 Ethiopian Navy ships capable of putting to sea fled Assab, ten of them steaming to Yemen and the others to Saudi Arabia, leaving behind seven ships and a variety of small craft. Assab fell to the EPLF soon after.

== End of the navy (1991–1996) ==
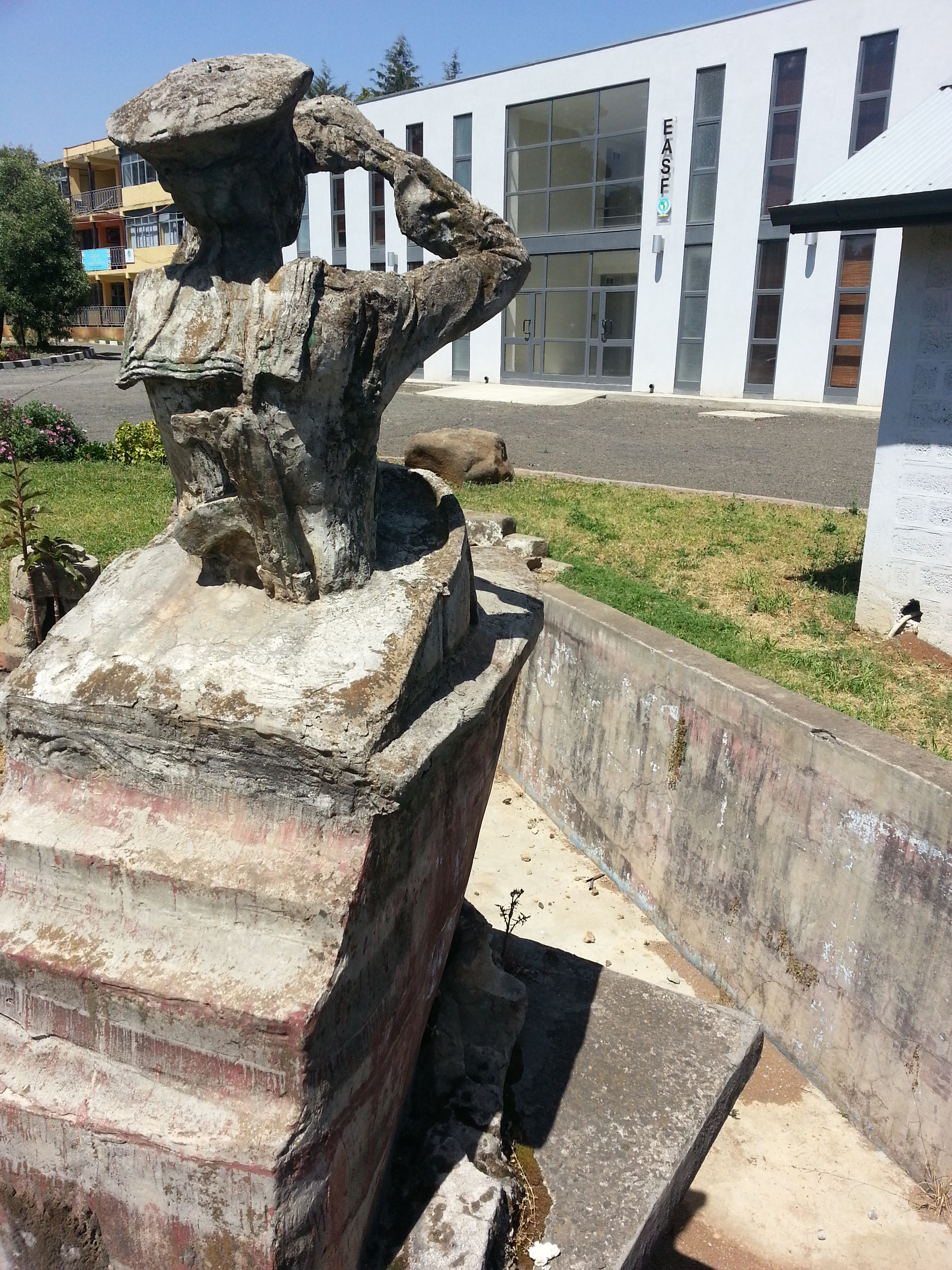
Disused monument and fountain on the grounds of the former headquarters of the Ethiopian Navy in Guele, Addis Ababa, Ethiopia. The facilities now serve as the headquarters of the East African Standby Force (EASF), East Africa's contribution to the African Standby Force. The monument now faces a housing block used by staff and students attending EASF.

The Ethiopian Civil War and Eritrean War of Independence both ended in 1991 soon after the fall of Assab, and Eritrea became independent, leaving Ethiopia landlocked. The Ethiopian Navy remained in existence, left in the curious and unusual position of having no home ports. Nonetheless, directed by its headquarters in Addis Ababa, it continued occasional patrols in the Red Sea from ports in Yemen. In 1993, Yemen finally expelled the Ethiopian ships; by then some had deteriorated too much to be seaworthy, and the Ethiopians left them behind in Yemen. Ethiopia had become a hulk after arriving in Yemen in 1991 and was sold for scrap in 1993; other Ethiopian ships were also scrapped or scuttled.

Those ships which could get underway from Yemen in 1993 moved to Djibouti. For a time it was thought that the Ethiopian Navy might survive, based at Assab in Eritrea or at Djibouti, and Ethiopia even requested that Eritrea lease it pier space at Assab from which to operate the surviving Ethiopian Navy. Eritrea refused the request. Proposals also were made for Eritrea and Ethiopia to divide the ships, with ships crewed by both countries operating from Eritrean ports as a kind of successor to the Ethiopian Navy, but Eritrea soon expressed a desire to organize an entirely separate Eritrean Navy.

By 1996, Djibouti was tired of having a foreign navy in its ports. The Ethiopian Navy had fallen behind in paying its harbor dues, and under this pretext Djibouti seized all of the remaining ships on 16 September 1996 and put them up for auction to pay the back dues. Eritrea expressed interest in 16 of them, but finally limited itself to purchasing only four of them—an Osa-II class missile boat and three Swiftships Shipbuilders patrol craft—in order to avoid exacerbating an international crisis with Yemen. The rest of the ships were scrapped.

Later in 1996, the Ethiopian Navy's headquarters in Addis Ababa disbanded, and the Ethiopian Navy ceased to exist. Its only remnant was the patrol boat GB-21; moved inland to Lake Tana and crewed by Ethiopian Army personnel, she survived as of 2009 as Ethiopia's only military watercraft.

== Revival (2018–present) ==
In June 2018, Prime Minister Abiy Ahmed called for the eventual reconstitution of the Ethiopian Navy as part of a wider program of security sector reforms, saying that "we should build our naval force capacity in the future".

In March 2019, Abiy Ahmed signed defense accords with France's Emmanuel Macron, including on support in establishing a naval component.

The Ethiopian Navy is based in Djibouti, and its headquarters is in Bahir Dar, Ethiopia.

In March 2025, a Russian Navy delegation led by Commander-in-Chief Admiral Vladimir Vorobyev visited Ethiopian Navy facilities and during his visit he signed a cooperation agreement for capacity building and training. Commodore Jamal Tufisa, Deputy Commander of Ethiopian Navy said, "both sides will continue to work together to strengthen the naval rebuilding that Ethiopian navy has begun and to further strengthen its readiness to protect Ethiopia’s interests in the international waters".

In May 2026, Massad Boulos serves as the Senior Advisor for Africa at the U.S. Department of State, appointed in President Donald Trump's administration. He stated, “We have repeatedly communicated to Ethiopia that we oppose any attempt to acquire sea access by force,” the U.S. government note cited by Reuters said, adding that both countries had been cautioned over “destabilizing roles” in each other’s affairs.

According to Reuters, regional diplomats say the U.S. sends a stern warning to landlocked Ethiopia that Washington does not support any forceful quest for sea access. The restoration of ties between Eritrea and The United States is seen by experts as precluding the possibility of war between Ethiopia and Eritrea.

== See also ==
- Ethiopian National Defense Force
- Ethiopian training ship Ethiopia (A-01)
