= Commander of the Ethiopian Navy =

Highest-ranking position in the Ethiopian Navy

- የኢትዮጵያ ባህር ኃይል አዛዥ (Amharic)
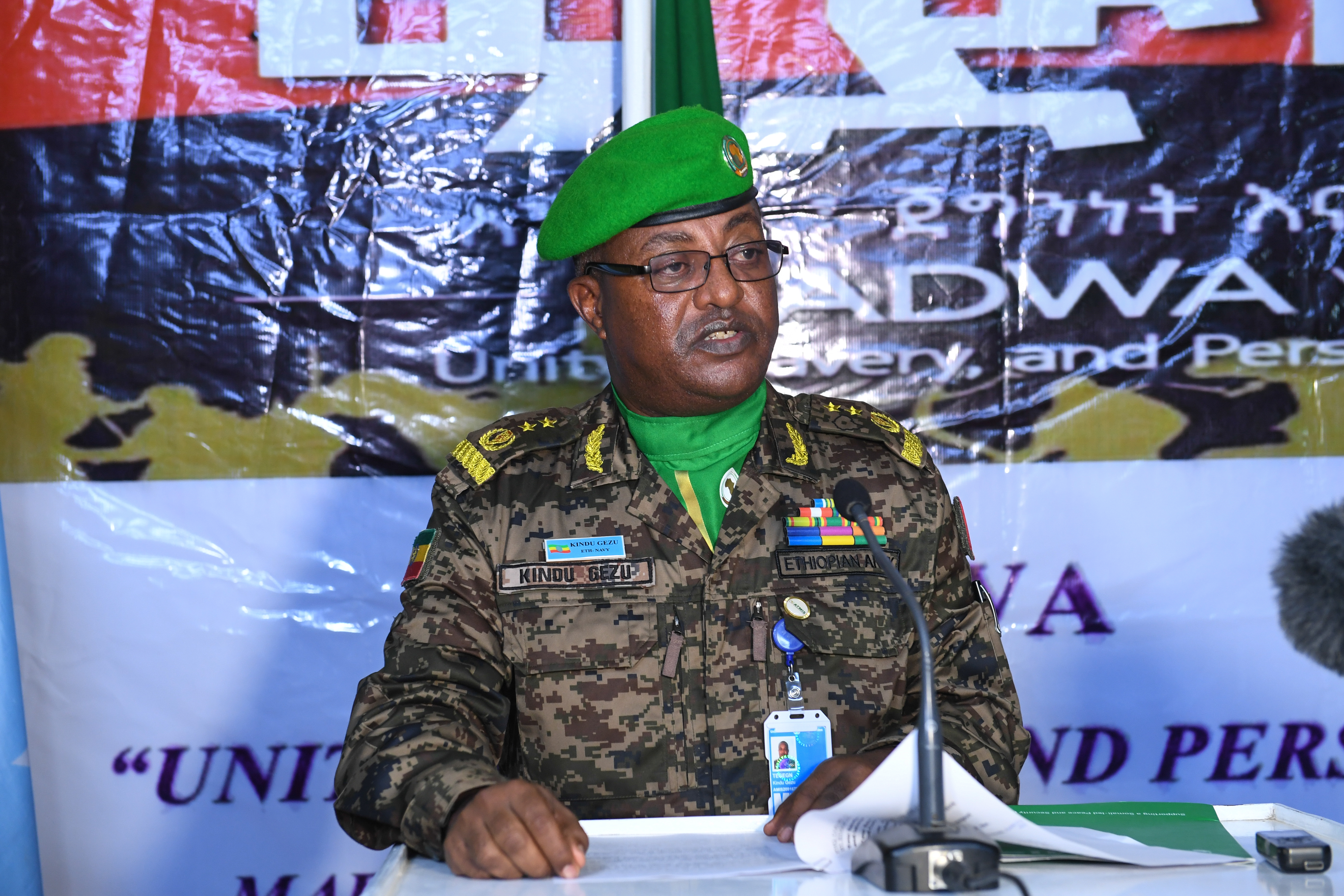
- Incumbent; Vice Admiral Kindu Gezu
- Ethiopian Navy
- Member of: Ethiopian National Defense Force
- Reports to: Chief of General Staff
- Residence: Bahir Dar, Ethiopia
- Appointer: Prime Minister

The Commander of the Ethiopian Navy (Amharic: የኢትዮጵያ ባህር ኃይል አዛዥ, romanized: ye’ītiyop’iya bahiri ḫayili āzazhi) is the highest-ranking military position in the Ethiopian Navy. The commander is responsible for the overall strategic direction, operational readiness, and administration of the navy.

== Duties and Responsibilities ==
The Commander of the Ethiopian Navy has the following duties and responsibilities:

- Overseeing the training, development, and welfare of naval personnel
- Developing and implementing naval strategies and operational plans
- Managing the navy's resources, including ships, submarines, and naval facilities
- Collaborating with international naval forces and participating in joint exercises
- Ensuring the readiness of the navy to defend Ethiopia's maritime interests
- Representing the Ethiopian Navy at national and international events

== List of commanders ==
Below is a list of individuals who have held the position of Commander of the Ethiopian Navy:

No.	Portrait	Name (birth–death)	Term of office			Ref.
No.	Portrait	Name (birth–death)	Took office	Left office	Time in office	Ref.
Deputy commander of the Imperial Ethiopian Navy (Note: Haile Selassie served as commander of the navy, in his capacity of Emperor of Ethiopia.)
1		Rear Admiral; Iskinder Desta (1934–1974)	1958	12 September 1974	15–16 years	
Commander of the Ethiopian Navy (Derg)
?		Rear Admiral; Tesfaye Berhanu	?	1989	?	
?		Rear Admiral; Yehualashet Girma	1989	1991	1–2 years	
Commander-in-Chief of the Ethiopian Navy
?		Vice Admiral; Kindu Gezu	19 January 2020	Incumbent	6 years, 273 days	

== See also ==
- Ethiopian Navy
- Military of Ethiopia
