= Chief of the Defence Force =

Chief of the Defence Force may refer to:

- Chief of the Defence Force (Australia)
- Chief of the Defence Staff (Canada)
- Chief of Defence Forces (Kenya)
- Chief of Defence Forces (Malaysia)
- Chief of Defence Force (Maldives)
- Chief of the Defence Force (Namibia)
- Chief of Defence Force (New Zealand)
- Chief of Defence Forces (Pakistan)
- Chief of Defence Force (Singapore)
- Chief of Defence Force (Somalia)
- Chief of the South African National Defence Force
- Chief of Defence Forces (Thailand)
- Chief of Defence Force (Timor-Leste)
- Chief of Defence Forces (Uganda)

== See also ==
- Defence Force (disambiguation)
- Chief of defence
- Chief of the Defence Staff (disambiguation)
- Commander of the Defence Force (disambiguation)
- Chief of Staff of the Armed Forces (disambiguation)
