= Commander of the Air Force =

Commander of the Air Force may refer to:

- Commander of the Air Force (Azerbaijan)
- Commander of the Brazilian Air Force
- Commander of the Royal Canadian Air Force
- Commander of the Air Force (Egypt)
- Commander of the Ethiopian Air Force
- Commander of the Israeli Air Force
- Commander of the People's Liberation Army Air Force
- Commander of the Royal Netherlands Air and Space Force
- Commander of the Air Force (Sri Lanka)
- Commander of Royal Air Force (Saudi Arabia)
- Commander of the Turkish Air Force
- Commander of the Air Force (Ukraine)
- Commander of the Air Force (Zimbabwe)

== See also ==
- Commander of the Army (disambiguation)
- Commander of the Navy (disambiguation)
