= Commander of the Army =

Commander of the Army may refer to:

- Commander of the Canadian Army
- Commander of the Army (Republic of China)
- Commander of the Army (Kyrgyzstan)
- Commander, Kenya Army
- Commander of the Army (Mexico)
- Commander of the Royal Netherlands Army
- Commander of the Army (Sri Lanka)
- Commander of the Turkish Army

== See also ==
- Commander of the Navy (disambiguation)
- Commander of the Air Force (disambiguation)
- Commander of the Armed Forces (disambiguation)
- Commander of the Army of the Lord
