= 1965 English cricket season =

1965 was the 66th season of County Championship cricket in England. It was the first season since the 1912 Triangular Tournament in which England played Test series against two touring teams. In the first half of a damp summer, New Zealand were the tourists, and England won all three matches. The South African team that toured in the second half of the season were much tougher opposition. South Africa won that three-match series 1–0, with two matches drawn. It was the last tour of England by a South African team until 1993. Fred Trueman's international career ended, although he did not retire from first-class cricket until the end of the 1968 season. Worcestershire won their second consecutive Championship title.

== Honours ==
- County Championship – Worcestershire
- Gillette Cup – Yorkshire
- Minor Counties Championship – Somerset II
- Second XI Championship – Glamorgan II
- Wisden (for their deeds in 1965) – Colin Bland, John Edrich, Dick Motz, Peter Pollock, Graeme Pollock

== Test series ==
For the first time since the 1912 Triangular Tournament, England hosted two series in one season. The visitors were New Zealand and South Africa, who played three Tests each against England. It became the last South African Test series against England for over 25 years because of increasing opposition to South Africa's apartheid policy.

England were far too strong for New Zealand, winning all three matches, John Edrich scoring 310* in the final match at Headingley. He put on 369 with Ken Barrington for the second wicket. This was the culmination of a remarkable run of form for Edrich. In nine successive innings (the first eight being for Surrey) he scored 139, 121*, 205*, 55, 96, 188, 92, 105 and 310*.

South Africa, a young and improving team, were a far tougher proposition. Their players included Graeme Pollock and his brother Peter, Colin Bland and Eddie Barlow. South Africa won the series 1–0, with two matches drawn, thanks to the Pollock brothers, who were mainly responsible for their win by 94 runs in the second Test at Trent Bridge. In overcast conditions, ideal for Tom Cartwright in particular, Graeme scored 125 out of 160 in 140 minutes, the last 91 coming in 70 minutes. He had come in at 16–2, and the score had declined to 80–5, before his partnerships with the captain, Peter van der Merwe, and Richard Dumbrill enabled the score to reach 269. He made another 59 in the second innings. His brother contributed bowling figures of 5–53 and 5–34.

== Leading batsmen ==
1965 English cricket season – leading batsmen by average
| Name | Innings | Runs | Highest | Average | 100s |
|---|---|---|---|---|---|
| Colin Cowdrey | 43 | 2093 | 196* | 63.42 | 5 |
| John Edrich | 44 | 2319 | 310* | 62.67 | 8 |
| Graeme Pollock | 24 | 1147 | 203* | 57.35 | 3 |
| Peter Parfitt | 44 | 1774 | 128 | 50.68 | 3 |
| Tom Graveney | 45 | 1768 | 126 | 49.11 | 4 |
| Basil d'Oliveira | 45 | 1691 | 163 | 43.35 | 6 |

1965 English cricket season – leading batsmen by aggregate
| Name | Innings | Runs | Highest | Average | 100s |
|---|---|---|---|---|---|
| John Edrich | 44 | 2319 | 310* | 62.67 | 8 |
| Colin Cowdrey | 43 | 2093 | 196* | 63.42 | 5 |
| David Green | 63 | 2037 | 85 | 32.85 | - |
| Eric Russell | 54 | 1930 | 156 | 39.38 | 4 |
| Alan Jones | 57 | 1837 | 142 | 36.74 | 5 |

- Note: David Green's record of 2000 runs in a season without a single century has not been equalled. The second highest total of runs with no century in a season is 1,709 by C.B. Harris in 1935. George Ulyett in 1883 with a highest innings of 84 was only eleven runs short of the leading run-scorer.

== Leading bowlers ==
1965 English cricket season – leading bowlers by average
| Name | Balls | Maidens | Runs | Wickets | Average |
|---|---|---|---|---|---|
| Harold Rhodes | 3881 | 187 | 1314 | 119 | 11.04 |
| Brian Jackson | 4847 | 262 | 1491 | 120 | 12.42 |
| Brian Statham | 4626 | 205 | 1716 | 137 | 12.52 |
| Tom Cartwright | 4411 | 305 | 1505 | 108 | 13.93 |
| Fred Trueman | 4528 | 180 | 1811 | 127 | 14.25 |

1965 English cricket season – leading bowlers by aggregate
| Name | Balls | Maidens | Runs | Wickets | Average |
|---|---|---|---|---|---|
| Derek Shackleton | 7476 | 529 | 2316 | 144 | 16.08 |
| Jack Flavell | 5460 | 217 | 2100 | 142 | 14.78 |
| Brian Statham | 4626 | 205 | 1716 | 137 | 12.52 |
| Fred Trueman | 4528 | 180 | 1811 | 127 | 14.25 |
| Barry Knight | 6098 | 216 | 2363 | 125 | 18.90 |

== Annual reviews ==
- Playfair Cricket Annual 1966
- Wisden Cricketers' Almanack 1966
