= Andrew Graeme Pollock =

South African cricketer (born 1969)

Andrew Pollock
Personal information
- Full name: Andrew Graeme Pollock
- Born: 14 November 1969 (age 56); Port Elizabeth, Cape Province, South Africa
- Batting: Left-handed
- Bowling: Right-arm fast-medium
- Relatives: Andrew Maclean Pollock (grandfather); Robert Howden (great-uncle); Graeme Pollock (father); Peter Pollock (uncle); Anthony Pollock (brother); Shaun Pollock (cousin)

Domestic team information
- Years: Team
- 1991/92–1995/96: Transvaal
- 1996/97–199798: Easterns
- FC debut: 13 December 1991 Transvaal B v Western Province B
- Last FC: 16 January 1998 Easterns v Easterns B
- LA debut: 5 October 1996 Easterns v Boland
- Last LA: 18 December 1998 Easterns v Griqualand West

Career statistics
Competition	First-class	List A
Matches	21	8
Runs scored	315	23
Batting average	22.50	5.75
100s/50s	0/1	0/0
Top score	56*	14
Balls bowled	3,078	282
Wickets	57	3
Bowling average	26.89	66.00
5 wickets in innings	0	0
10 wickets in match	0	0
Best bowling	4/52	1/10
Catches/stumpings	4/–	1/–
- Source: CricketArchive, 23 December 2008

Andrew Graeme Pollock (born 14 November 1969) is a former first-class and List A cricketer who played for Transvaal and Easterns in the 1990s. He comes from a cricketing family. He is the son of the South African Test cricketer Graeme Pollock, nephew of Peter Pollock, grandson of Andrew Maclean Pollock, and a cousin of Shaun Pollock. His brother is Anthony Pollock.
