= South African cricket team in England in 1965 =

International cricket tour

The South African cricket team toured England in the second half of the 1965 season, winning the three match Test series 1–0, with two matches drawn. They had a young and improving side. Their players included Graeme Pollock and his brother Peter, Colin Bland and Eddie Barlow.

The Pollock brothers were mainly responsible for their win by 94 runs in the Second Test at Trent Bridge. In overcast conditions, ideal for Tom Cartwright in particular, Graeme scored 125 out of 160 in 140 minutes, the last 91 coming in 70 minutes. He had come in at 16–2, and the score had declined to 80–5, before his partnerships with the captain, Peter van der Merwe, and Richard Dumbrill enabled the score to reach 269. He made another 59 in the second innings. His brother contributed bowling figures of 5-53 and 5-34.

== South African team ==
- Peter van der Merwe (captain)
- Ali Bacher
- Eddie Barlow
- Colin Bland
- Jackie Botten
- Harry Bromfield
- Norman Crookes
- Richard Dumbrill
- Dennis Gamsy
- Tiger Lance
- Denis Lindsay
- Mike Macaulay
- Atholl McKinnon
- Graeme Pollock
- Peter Pollock

The manager was Jack Plimsoll, a former Test player.

== Test series summary ==
=== First Test ===
22–27 July 1965
Scorecard

South Africa	v	England
280 (119.3 overs); RG Pollock 56 (106); DJ Brown 3/44 (24 overs)		338 (150.2 overs); KF Barrington 91 (178); R Dumbrill 3/31 (24 overs)
248 (110 overs); KC Bland 70 (145); DJ Brown 3/30 (21 overs)		145/7 (68 overs); MC Cowdrey 37 (78); R Dumbrill 4/30 (18 overs)

Match drawn
Lord's, London
Umpires: JS Buller and AEG Rhodes

- South Africa won the toss and elected to bat.
- 25 July was taken as a rest day.
- DJ Brown (ENG), and A Bacher, R Dumbrill and JT Botten (SA) made their Test debuts.

=== Second Test ===
5–9 August 1965
Scorecard

South Africa	v	England
269 (101.3 overs); RG Pollock 125; TW Cartwright 6/94 (31.3 overs)		240 (93.5 overs); MC Cowdrey 105; PM Pollock 5/53 (23.5 overs)
289 (110.4 overs); EJ Barlow 76; JDF Larter 5/68 (29 overs)		224 (98 overs); PH Parfitt 86; PM Pollock 5/34 (24 overs)

South Africa won by 94 runs
Trent Bridge, Nottingham
Umpires: JF Crapp and CS Elliott

- South Africa won the toss and elected to bat.
- 8 August was taken as a rest day.

=== Third Test ===
26–31 August 1965
Scorecard

South Africa	v	England
208 (96.2 overs); HR Lance 69; JB Statham 5/40 (24.2 overs)		202 (98.1 overs); MC Cowdrey 58; PM Pollock 5/43 (25.1 overs)
392 (133.1 overs); KC Bland 53; K Higgs 4/96 (41.1 overs)		308/4 (104.2 overs); MC Cowdrey 78*; PM Pollock 2/93 (32.2 overs)

Match drawn
The Oval, London
Umpires: JS Buller and WFF Price

- England won the toss and elected to field.
- 29 August was taken as a rest day
- K Higgs (ENG) made his Test debut.

== Other matches ==
No.	Date	Opponents	Venue	Result	Ref
1	26–29 June	Derbyshire	Queen's Park, Chesterfield	Lost by seven wickets	
2	30 June–2 July	Yorkshire	Bramall Lane, Sheffield	Drawn	
3	3–6 July	Essex	Castle Park, Colchester	Drawn	
4	7–9 July	Surrey	The Oval, London	Drawn	
5	10–13 July	Gloucestershire	County Ground, Bristol	Drawn	
6	14–16 July	Minor Counties	Osborne Avenue, Jesmond	Won by 203 runs	
7	17–20 July	Leicestershire	Grace Road, Leicester	Drawn	
8	22–27 July	ENGLAND (1st Test)	Lord's, London	Drawn	
9	28–29 July	Kent	St Lawrence Ground, Canterbury	Won by an innings and 147 runs	
10	31 July–3 August	Glamorgan	St Helen's, Swansea	Drawn	
11	5–9 August	ENGLAND (2nd Test)	Trent Bridge, Nottingham	Won by 94 runs	
12	11–13 August	Middlesex	Lord's, London	Won by five wickets	
13	14–17 August	Hampshire	County Ground, Southampton	Drawn	
14	18–20 August	Sussex	County Ground, Hove	Drawn	
15	21–24 August	Warwickshire	Edgbaston, Birmingham	Drawn	
16	26–31 August	ENGLAND (3rd Test)	The Oval, London	Drawn	
17	1–3 September	Lancashire	Old Trafford, Manchester	Won by 166 runs	
18	4–6 September	T. N. Pearce's XI	North Marine Road, Scarborough	Lost by eight wickets	
O-D	7 September	T. N. Pearce's XI (fill-up match)	North Marine Road, Scarborough	Lost by 13 runs	
O-D	9 September	Yorkshire	Park Avenue, Bradford	Abandoned	

== Annual reviews ==
- Playfair Cricket Annual 1966
- Wisden Cricketers' Almanack 1966
