= Mike Macaulay =

South African cricketer (1939–2021)

Personal information
- Full name: Michael John Macaulay
- Born: 19 April 1939; Durban, Natal, South Africa
- Died: 10 December 2021 (aged 82); Gqeberha, Eastern Cape, South Africa
- Batting: Right-handed
- Bowling: Left-arm medium; Slow left-arm orthodox

International information
- National side: South Africa
- Only Test: 12 February 1965 v England

Domestic team information
- Years: Team
- 1957/58–1959/60: Transvaal
- 1960/61: Western Province
- 1961/62–1962/63: Transvaal
- 1963/64–1964/65: Orange Free State
- 1965/66: Transvaal
- 1966/67–1968/69: North-Eastern Transvaal
- 1977/78–1978/79: Eastern Province

Career statistics
Competition	Test	First-class
Matches	1	69
Runs scored	33	888
Batting average	16.50	13.05
100s/50s	0/0	0/2
Top score	21	59
Balls bowled	276	13,566
Wickets	2	234
Bowling average	36.50	22.89
5 wickets in innings	0	16
10 wickets in match	0	4
Best bowling	1/10	7/49
Catches/stumpings	0/–	45/–
- Source: CricketArchive, 15 November 2022

Michael John Macaulay (19 April 1939 – 10 December 2021) was a South African cricketer who played his only Test match for the country in 1965.

== Cricket career ==
A left-arm pace bowler who sometimes also bowled spin, Macaulay was educated at Hilton College where he played for the 1st XI. He made his first-class debut for Transvaal against Border in 1957–58, becoming a regular player in 1959–60. In 1963–64, playing for Orange Free State in the B Section of the Currie Cup, he took 37 wickets at 13.35, including career-best figures of 7 for 49 (11 for 97 in the match) against Rhodesia at Bloemfontein.

Selected for a South African Colts XI against the MCC touring team in 1964–65, Macaulay made 55 not out, his first first-class 50; going in at number 11, he put on 112 for the last wicket with Jackie Botten in less than an hour. A few weeks later he took 7 for 58 when the MCC played Orange Free State, out of a first innings total of 199 for 7 declared. He was included in the South African team for the Fifth Test in Port Elizabeth, taking two wickets in a drawn match, bowling most of the time with a painfully injured heel.

He toured England in 1965 but the pace trio of Peter Pollock, Richard Dumbrill and Jackie Botten were preferred in the three Tests.

Macaulay continued to play domestic first-class cricket until a knee injury forced him to retire after the 1968–69 season. However, he returned in 1977–78 at the age of 37, taking 42 wickets for Eastern Province at 23.14 and bowling more overs than anyone else in the country. After two games the next season he retired for good. He was the first player to represent five provinces in the Currie Cup, out of the nine that competed at the time.
