= Boxing Day Test (disambiguation) =

The Boxing Day Test is a cricket match held in Australia.

Boxing Day Test may also refer to:

- Boxing Day Test (New Zealand), a cricket match held in New Zealand
- Boxing Day Test (South Africa), a cricket match held in South Africa
