= Andrew Maclean Pollock =

Scottish-born South African cricketer

Andrew Pollock
Personal information
- Full name: Andrew Maclean Pollock
- Born: 11 June 1914; Edinburgh, Scotland
- Died: 19 December 1969 (aged 55); Port Elizabeth, Cape Province, South Africa
- Batting: Left-handed
- Role: Wicket-keeper

Domestic team information
- Years: Team
- 1934/35–1937/38: Orange Free State

Career statistics
Competition	First-class
Matches	7
Runs scored	22
Batting average	2.75
100s/50s	0/0
Top score	12
Catches/stumpings	7/1
- Source: CricketArchive, 7 November 2008

Andrew Maclean Pollock (11 June 1914 – 19 December 1969) was a Scottish-born South African cricketer, who played a small number of first-class matches for Orange Free State. A left-handed batsman and wicketkeeper, he was the father of Peter Pollock and Graeme Pollock, the grandfather of Shaun, Anthony and Andrew Graeme Pollock, and the brother in law of Robert Howden.
