= 1883 English cricket season =

Cricket season review

The 1883 English cricket season was the 20th since the legalisation of overarm bowling. There was the first of four successive titles won by Notts, and the beginning of the "Great Revival" of Surrey, who had been among the weaker counties since 1866. (Note: Some eleven-a-side matches played from 1772 to 1863 have been rated "first-class" by certain sources. However, the term only came into common use around 1864, when overarm bowling was legalised. It was formally defined as a standard by a meeting at Lord's, in May 1894, of Marylebone Cricket Club (MCC) and the county clubs which were then competing in the County Championship. The ruling was effective from the beginning of the 1895 season, but pre-1895 matches of the same standard have no official definition of status because the ruling is not retrospective. Matches of a similar standard since the beginning of the 1864 season are generally considered to have an unofficial first-class status. Pre-1864 matches which are included in the ACS' "Important Match Guide" may generally be regarded as top-class or, at least, historically significant. For further information, see First-class cricket.)

== Champion County ==
^{[a]}

- Nottinghamshire

=== Playing record (by county) ===
County	Played	Won	Lost	Drawn
Derbyshire	8	2	5	1
Gloucestershire	12	3	6	3
Hampshire	6	2	3	1
Kent	10	2	6	2
Lancashire	12	6	5	1
Middlesex	10	4	2	4
Nottinghamshire	12	4	1	7
Somerset	6	1	5	0
Surrey	20	10	5	5
Sussex	12	4	7	1
Yorkshire	16	9	2	5

== Leading batsmen (qualification 20 innings) ==
1883 English season leading batsmen
Name	Team	Matches	Innings	Not outs	Runs	Highest score	Average	100s	50s
Walter Read	Surrey	22	39	6	1573	168	47.66	2	13
CT Studd	Middlesex; Marylebone Cricket Club (MCC)	20	34	5	1193	175 not out	41.13	2	4
WG Grace	Gloucestershire; Marylebone Cricket Club (MCC)	22	41	2	1352	112	34.66	1	9
Louis Hall	Yorkshire	26	44	9	1180	127	33.73	2	3
Bunny Lucas	Middlesex; Marylebone Cricket Club (MCC)	12	23	3	664	97	33.23	0	4

== Leading bowlers (qualification 1,000 balls) ==
1883 English season leading bowlers
Name	Team	Balls bowled	Runs conceded	Wickets taken	Average	Best bowling	5 wickets in innings	10 wickets in match
Alec Watson	Lancashire	3762	1135	96	11.82	7/36	9	2
Alfred Shaw	Nottinghamshire	4247	840	67	12.53	7/22	7	0
John Crossland	Lancashire	2191	934	72	12.97	8/57	6	0
George Harrison	Yorkshire	3143	1326	100	13.26	7/43	6	1
George Robinson	Oxford University	1015	471	35	13.45	6/38	2	0

== Notable events ==
- 30 January – England won the deciding match of the scheduled three-Test series in Melbourne (although an additional match was arranged later). Some ladies burned the bails and placed the resultant ashes in a small urn. This was presented to England's captain, Ivo Bligh, who had promised to "recover those ashes". The urn is kept in a glass case at Lord's but England and Australia have been playing for the Ashes ever since.
- 25 May – Surrey, in a season that marked their revival from a lowly position since 1866 to the champion eleven of the late 1880s and early 1890s, break the record highest team total in county cricket by scoring 650 against Hampshire.
- George Harrison became the first bowler to take 100 wickets in the season in which he made his debut in first-class cricket.
- George Ulyett scored 1,562 runs with a highest score of 84. Not until Charles Harris in 1935 did a player scoring no centuries score more runs in a season.
  - Ulyett's feat of getting within eleven runs of the leading scorer with no centuries has been approached since only by David Green in 1965.

== Labels ==
^{a} An unofficial seasonal title sometimes proclaimed by consensus of media and historians prior to December 1889 when the official County Championship was constituted. Although there are ante-dated claims prior to 1873, when residence qualifications were introduced, it is only since that ruling that any quasi-official status can be ascribed.

== Bibliography ==
- ACS (1981). A Guide to Important Cricket Matches Played in the British Isles 1709–1863. Nottingham: ACS. OCLC 85045528.
- ACS (1982). A Guide to First-class Cricket Matches Played in the British Isles. Nottingham: ACS. OCLC 10586869.
- Warner, Pelham (1946). Lords: 1787–1945. London: Harrap. OCLC 877106024.

== Annual reviews ==
- John Lillywhite's Cricketer's Companion (Green Lilly), Lillywhite, 1884
- James Lillywhite's Cricketers' Annual (Red Lilly), Lillywhite, 1884
- Wisden Cricketers' Almanack, 1884
