= Ravenor Nicholson =

South African cricketer (born 1943)

Personal information
- Full name: Ravenor Michael Nicholson
- Born: 6 October 1943 (age 83); Berea, Durban, South Africa
- Batting: Right-handed
- Bowling: Right-arm medium

Domestic team information
- Years: Team
- 1965/66–1968/69: Natal
- FC debut: 27 December 1965 Natal B v Transvaal B
- Last FC: 28 February 1969 Natal B v Transvaal B

Career statistics
Competition	First-class
Matches	20
Runs scored	514
Batting average	23.36
100s/50s	0/1
Top score	89*
Balls bowled	3,260
Wickets	54
Bowling average	22.81
5 wickets in innings	2
10 wickets in match	1
Best bowling	5/12
Catches/stumpings	7/–
- Source: CricInfo, 6 December 2008

Ravenor Nicholson (born 6 October 1943) is a former South African cricketer, who played four seasons of first-class cricket for the Natal cricket team. A right-handed batsman and medium-pace bowler, his only first-class half century was 89 not out for Natal B against Transvaal B in December 1967. Nicholson's best bowling came in the following match against Griqualand West, taking five wickets in each innings, and finishing with match figures of 10/63. Nicholson is the cousin of Test match brothers Peter and Graeme Pollock. His brother Christopher played one first-class match for South African Universities in 1967.

He was born in Durban, Natal.
