= Boxing Day (disambiguation) =

Boxing Day is a Commonwealth holiday.

Boxing Day may also refer to:

- Boxing Day (2007 film), a film by Kriv Stenders
- Boxing Day (2012 film), a film by Bernard Rose
- Boxing Day (2021 film), a film by Aml Ameen
- "Boxing Day", an episode of Bedtime
- "Boxing Day", a song by Blink-182 from the EP Dogs Eating Dogs
- "Boxing Day", a song by Relient K from the album Let It Snow, Baby... Let It Reindeer
- "Boxing Day", a song by Car Seat Headrest from the album Nervous Young Man

== See also ==
- Boxing Day Blizzard, another name for the December 2010 North American blizzard
- Boxing Day Challenge, an annual match that takes place on 26 December in England
- Boxing Day Dip, a charity event where people in fancy dress swim in the sea on Boxing Day
- Boxing Day shooting, a Canadian gang-related shooting which occurred on December 26, 2005, in Toronto
- Boxing Day Storm, an Atlantic windstorm in 1998
- Boxing Day Test (disambiguation), various cricket matches
- Boxing Day tsunami, an alternate name for the 2004 Indian Ocean earthquake and tsunami
