= Pakistani cricket team in South Africa in 2002–03 =

Pakistan in South Africa in 2002–03
	Pakistan	South Africa
- Dates: 3 December 2002 – 6 January 2003
Captains	Waqar Younis	Shaun Pollock

Test series
- Result: South Africa won the 2-match series 2–0
Most runs	Taufeeq Umar (280)	Herschelle Gibbs (264)
Most wickets	Saqlain Mushtaq (7)	Makhaya Ntini (13)
- Player of the series: Makhaya Ntini (SA)

One Day International series
- Results: South Africa won the 5-match series 4–1
Most runs	Saleem Elahi (198)	Boeta Dippenaar (187)
Most wickets	Waqar Younis (10)	Jacques Kallis (10); Makhaya Ntini (10)
- Player of the series: Shaun Pollock (SA)

The Pakistan national cricket team toured South Africa during the 2002–03 season, playing five One Day Internationals (ODIs) and two Test matches, as well as four tour matches, between 3 December 2002 and 6 January 2003. South Africa won the ODI series 4-1. South Africa also won the Test series 2-0.

== Squads ==
Tests		ODIs	
Pakistan	South Africa	Pakistan	South Africa
Waqar Younis (c); Inzamam-ul-Haq (vc); Abdul Razzaq; Faisal Iqbal; Hasan Raza; Kamran Akmal (wk); Mohammad Sami; Mohammad Zahid; Saleem Elahi; Saqlain Mushtaq; Shahid Afridi; Shoaib Akhtar; Taufeeq Umar; Wasim Akram; Younis Khan; Yousuf Youhana	Shaun Pollock (c); Mark Boucher (vc); Nicky Boje; Boeta Dippenaar; Steve Elworthy; Herschelle Gibbs; Andrew Hall; Nantie Hayward; Jacques Kallis; Gary Kirsten; Neil McKenzie; Makhaya Ntini; Graeme Smith; Monde Zondeki	Waqar Younis (c); Inzamam-ul-Haq (vc); Abdul Razzaq; Faisal Iqbal; Kamran Akmal; Misbah-ul-Haq; Mohammad Sami; Mohammad Zahid; Rashid Latif (wk); Saleem Elahi; Saqlain Mushtaq; Shahid Afridi; Shoaib Akhtar; Taufeeq Umar; Wasim Akram; Younis Khan; Yousuf Youhana	Shaun Pollock (c); Mark Boucher (vc); Nicky Boje; Boeta Dippenaar; Allan Donald; Herschelle Gibbs; Andrew Hall; Jacques Kallis; Gary Kirsten; Lance Klusener; Neil McKenzie; Makhaya Ntini; Robin Peterson; Jonty Rhodes; Graeme Smith; Monde Zondeki

Batsman Gary Kirsten was added to the South Africa squad for the final two ODIs, while Neil McKenzie and Nicky Boje were dropped. After originally being named in the 15-man squad for the first Test, Monde Zondeki was released to play for Border in the Standard Bank Cup, South Africa's one-day cricket competition; he was recalled for the second Test.

== ODI series ==
=== 1st ODI ===
8 December 2002
Scorecard

South Africa; 272/7 (50 overs)	v	Pakistan; 140 (42.5 overs)
Jonty Rhodes 98 (92); Wasim Akram 3/19 (10 overs)		Saleem Elahi 31 (69); Shaun Pollock 3/12 (9.5 overs)

South Africa won by 132 runs
Kingsmead Cricket Ground, Durban
Umpires: Ian Howell and Neil Mallender (Eng)
Player of the match: Jonty Rhodes (SA)

- Pakistan won the toss and elected to field.
- Waqar Younis (Pak) became the second player to take 400 ODI wickets.

=== 2nd ODI ===
11 December 2002 (D/N)
Scorecard

Pakistan; 335/6 (50 overs)	v	South Africa; 153 (29 overs)
Saleem Elahi 135 (129); Allan Donald 2/60 (10 overs)		Herschelle Gibbs 40 (30); Mohammad Sami 3/26 (5 overs)

Pakistan won by 182 runs
St George's Park Cricket Ground, Port Elizabeth
Umpires: Brian Jerling and Neil Mallender (Eng)
Player of the match: Saleem Elahi (Pak)

- Pakistan won the toss and elected to bat.

=== 3rd ODI ===
13 December 2002 (D/N)
Scorecard

South Africa; 182 (47.5 overs)	v	Pakistan; 120 (36.2 overs)
Boeta Dippenaar 47 (81); Shoaib Akhtar 3/50 (10 overs)		Wasim Akram 43* (53); Shaun Pollock 3/23 (8 overs)

South Africa won by 62 runs
Buffalo Park, East London
Umpires: Ian Howell and Neil Mallender (Eng)
Player of the match: Shaun Pollock (SA)

- South Africa won the toss and elected to bat.

=== 4th ODI ===
16 December 2002
Scorecard

Pakistan; 213 (48.4 overs)	v	South Africa; 214/1 (42 overs)
Mohammad Yousuf 61 (71); Jacques Kallis 2/35 (9 overs)		Gary Kirsten 102* (118); Abdul Razzaq 1/32 (7 overs)

South Africa won by 9 wickets
Boland Park, Paarl
Umpires: Brian Jerling and Neil Mallender (Eng)
Player of the match: Gary Kirsten (SA)

- Pakistan won the toss and elected to bat.

=== 5th ODI ===
18 December 2002 (D/N)
Scorecard

South Africa; 265/8 (50 overs)	v	Pakistan; 231 (47.4 overs)
Boeta Dippenaar 93 (126); Waqar Younis 4/41 (10 overs)		Younis Khan 72 (81); Jacques Kallis 5/41 (8.4 overs)

South Africa won by 34 runs
Newlands Cricket Ground, Cape Town
Umpires: Ian Howell and Neil Mallender (Eng)
Player of the match: Jonty Rhodes (SA)

- South Africa won the toss and elected to bat.

== Test series ==
=== 1st Test ===
26–30 December 2002
Scorecard

South Africa	v	Pakistan
368 (107 overs); Jacques Kallis 105 (236); Saqlain Mushtaq 4/119 (37 overs)		161 (48.4 overs); Taufeeq Umar 39 (69); Nantie Hayward 5/56 (10.4 overs)
45/0 (9 overs); Herschelle Gibbs 25* (17)		250 (87.3 overs) (f/o); Mohammad Yousuf 42 (48); Shaun Pollock 2/29 (17.3 overs)

South Africa won by 10 wickets
Kingsmead Cricket Ground, Durban
Umpires: Srinivasaraghavan Venkataraghavan (Ind) and Steve Bucknor (WI)
Player of the match: Jacques Kallis (SA)

- Pakistan won the toss and elected to field.
- Rain delayed the start of play on Day 1 by 40 minutes.

=== 2nd Test ===
2–6 January 2003
Scorecard

South Africa	v	Pakistan
620/7d (135 overs); Herschelle Gibbs 228 (240); Saqlain Mushtaq 3/237 (50 overs)		252 (87.4 overs); Taufeeq Umar 135 (254); Shaun Pollock 4/45 (23 overs)
		226 (59.1 overs); Taufeeq Umar 67 (101); Makhaya Ntini 4/33 (15.1 overs)

South Africa won by an innings and 142 runs
Newlands Cricket Ground, Cape Town
Umpires: Srinivasaraghavan Venkataraghavan (Ind) and Steve Bucknor (WI)
Player of the match: Herschelle Gibbs (SA)

- South Africa won the toss and elected to bat.

== Tour matches ==
=== One-day: Nicky Oppenheimer XI v Pakistanis ===
3 December 2002
Scorecard

Pakistanis; 229/9d (55 overs)	v	Nicky Oppenheimer XI; 187/9 (47.3 overs)
Abdul Razzaq 63* (104); Garnett Kruger 3/49 (11 overs)		Zander de Bruyn; Mohammad Sami 4/52 (13.3 overs)

Match drawn
NF Oppenheimer Ground, Randjesfontein
Umpires: P Durrell and Zed Ndamane

- Nicky Oppenheimer XI won the toss and elected to field.

=== 50-over: South Africa A v Pakistanis ===
5 December 2002 (D/N)
Scorecard

South Africa A 206/6 (50 overs)	v	Pakistanis; 158/7 (28.4 overs)
Jacques Rudolph 95 (151); Abdul Razzaq 3/52 (10 overs)		Faisal Iqbal 59 (75); Steve Elworthy 2/19 (5.4 overs)

Pakistanis won by 3 wickets (D/L method)
Willowmoore Park, Benoni
Umpires: KH Hurter and SB Lambson
Player of the match: Jacques Rudolph (South Africa A)

- South Africa A won the toss and elected to bat.
- Rain stopped play for 127 minutes after 1.1 overs of the Pakistanis' innings; when play resumed, the innings was reduced to 29 overs, and the Pakistanis were given a revised target of 157.

=== 25-over: Border Invitation XI v Pakistanis ===
14 December 2002
Scorecard

Pakistanis; 135/9 (25 overs)	v	Border Invitation XI; 136/5 (25 overs)
Younis Khan 38; Liam Graham 5/20 (5 overs)		Craig Sugden 55*; Mohammad Sami 3/26 (5 overs)

Border Invitation XI won by 5 wickets
University Fort Hare, Alice
Umpires: L King and HC Lindenberg

- Border Invitation XI won the toss and elected to field.

=== Three-day: South Africa A v Pakistanis ===
21–23 December 2002
Scorecard

Pakistanis	v	South Africa A
174 (57.4 overs); Waqar Younis 36 (40); Robin Peterson 6/72 (21.4 overs)		206 (65 overs); Jacques Rudolph 92 (171); Mohammad Zahid 5/43 (15 overs)
174/8 (66 overs); Taufeeq Umar 89* (193); Robin Peterson 4/61 (19 overs)

Match drawn
City Oval, Pietermaritzburg
Umpires: Ian Howell and Brian Jerling

- Pakistanis won the toss and elected to bat.
