= Chris Nicholson (judge) =

South African high court judge and cricketer

Christopher Robert Nicholson, SC (born on 5 February 1945) is a retired South African High Court judge and a former cricketer, who played one first-class match for South African Universities in 1967. He attained prominence as a judge when he ruled that the South African Government had tampered with the evidence in the case against Jacob Zuma, an act that led to the resignation of the President of South Africa, Thabo Mbeki.

== Early life and sporting career ==
Nicholson was born on 5 February 1945 on a farm near Richmond, Natal, Union of South Africa, and was educated at Michaelhouse and at the University of Natal where he read law. He is a cousin of the brothers Peter and Graeme Pollock who played Test cricket for South Africa, is brother to Ravenor Nicholson, another first-class cricketer, and is also a cousin of the writer Alan Paton.

Nicholson represented the South African Universities against North Eastern Transvaal as a right-hand off spin bowler and a left-handed batsman. He took 3 for 58 in the match and batting at number 9, scored a total of 17 runs.

By the time Nicholson left university, the question of racial segregation in South African sport had led to South Africa's exclusion from the Olympic Games and in 1968, the English cricket team withdrew from a tour of South Africa due to the South African government's objection to the inclusion of Basil d’Oliveira, a South African born coloured player who had emigrated to the United Kingdom to play professional cricket. In 1971, leading South African cricketers left the field in a token protest against apartheid during a match to commemorate the tenth anniversary of the founding of the Republic of South Africa.

In 1973, Nicholson was among the founders of the Aurora Cricket Club – a mixed race club that applied for affiliation to the Maritzburg Cricket Union (MCU) and for inclusion in the all-white local cricket league. The club's inclusion in the league was supported by the Natal Cricket Association, and refused to be bullied by intimidatory police tactics such as taking the names of players and spectators – after each match the club voluntarily handed the police a list of all players.

== Legal Resources Centre ==
In 1979, Nicholson, following on the efforts of Arthur Chaskalson in Johannesburg, founded the Durban chapter of the Legal Resources Centre (LRC) to assist those who could not afford advice or legal representation. One such case was the 1984 challenge he successfully brought against the pass laws, which were intended to restrict "idle and undesirable" people to rural confines. In another case in 1986, his name was closely associated with Archbishop Denis Hurley's case against the minister of law and order when he turned the internal security laws on their head by challenging the right to detain for purposes of interrogation.

By the end of that decade the challenge had begun to take its toll. Exhausted, and diagnosed with chronic fatigue syndrome, Nicholson resigned from his position at the LRC and took up a lecturing post at the Durban campus of the University of Natal where he taught evidence, civil procedure and professional practice. The slower pace of life in academia allowed him to spend time following his other pursuits – music and sport and to recover his health.

== Advocate and judge ==
In the early 1990s he left the university and took silk as a Senior Counsel, enabling him to become a judge. He was appointed to the bench in 1995, one of the first in post-Apartheid South Africa. He was later appointed to the Labour Appeal Court, and later became senior judge on the Natal bench. In 2006 he found the government to be in contempt of court over the provision of antiretrovirals for prisoners at Westville Prison and in mid-2008 he ruled against the Erasmus Commission, set up by Ebrahim Rasool to probe allegations of bribery in the City of Cape Town, finding that the former premier had abused his provincial powers.

Jacob Zuma was the deputy president of South Africa, leader of the African National Congress and poised to succeed Thabo Mbeki as President of South Africa. He was dismissed as deputy president by Mbeki in June 2005 when his financial advisor Schabir Shaik, was convicted of corruption and fraud. Zuma was subsequently charged with corruption by the National Prosecuting Authority. On 28 December 2007, after various procedural delays the Scorpions (A government anti-corruption and anti-fraud investigation branch) served Zuma an indictment to stand trial in the High Court on various counts of racketeering, money laundering, corruption and fraud. Zuma appealed against the charges and on 12 September 2008 Nicholson held that Zuma's corruption charges were unlawful on procedural grounds. In his judgment Nicholson also wrote that he believed that there was political interference in the timing of the charges being brought against Zuma. Although this was initially denied by Mbeki, Mbeki was forced to resign on 20 September 2008.

Nicholson's ruling dismissing the charges against Zuma was unanimously overturned by the Supreme Court of Appeal, in a ruling which was critical of Nicholson's judgement in the case, including his addition of personal opinions to the ruling, and of including "gratuitous findings" about Mbeki and others in his judgement.

After Nicholson retired, he headed a committee appointed by Fikile Mbalula, South African Sport and Recreation Minister that investigated the affairs of the South Africa's national cricketing body Cricket South Africa (CSA). The investigation was triggered by a report from KPMG, the federation's auditor that a bonus of R4.5 million (about GBP 400,000 or $700,000) had been paid to CSA's chief executive Gerald Majola without the knowledge of the federation's remuneration committee. The commission found that Majola had breached the South African Companies Act at least four times and recommended that both the SCA and the South African Revenue Service should consider taking further action. The commission also recommended a restructuring of CSA's structure.

== Books written by Nicholson ==
Nicholson has written a number books that reflect his other interests:

- — (2004). Permanent Removal: Who Killed the Cradock Four?. Wits University Press. ISBN 978-1-86814-401-3. – Nicholson documents the cover-up and subsequent exposure of the murder of four anti-Apartheid activists, "The Craddock Four", in the Eastern Cape.
- — (2005). Papwa Sewgolum: From Pariah to Legend. Wits University Press. ISBN 978-1-86814-411-2. – A biography of Papwa Sewgolum, a South African golfer of Indian descent who, on account of the colour of his skin, had to receive the trophy for winning the Natal Open Golf Tournament in the rain as he was refused admission to the whites-only clubhouse.
- — (2007). Richard and Adolf: Did Richard Wagner Incite Adolf Hitler to Commit the Holocaust?. Gefen. ISBN 978-965-229-360-2. – Nicholson investigates the degree to which Wagner's anti-semitic views might have influenced Hitler.
