= Pink ODI =

Annual cricket match in South Africa

The Pink ODI is an annual One Day International cricket match held at the Wanderers Stadium in Johannesburg, South Africa. The match features the South African national cricket team and a touring international side, typically during the Southern Hemisphere summer.

The Pink Day ODI has been recognized as one of South Africa's major sporting events, comparable to the Soweto Derby and longstanding rugby matches between the Springboks and the All Blacks.

== History ==
The first Pink ODI was held in 2013 to raise funds and awareness for breast cancer and was inspired by Sydney's Jane McGrath Day, where the Sydney Cricket Ground (SCG) was illuminated in pink to honor Jane McGrath, the wife of Australian fast bowler Glenn McGrath, who died from breast cancer.

The South African team, known as the Proteas, won the first six Pink Day ODIs, during which they wore pink uniforms. One of the notable performances on Pink ODI is by AB de Villiers who scored the fastest ODI century of all time.

== Fund raising ==
Funds raised from the Pink Day ODI benefit the Breast Care Unit at Charlotte Maxeke Hospital in Johannesburg. Approximately R10 million has been donated to the unit since the event's inception.

== See also ==
- Boxing Day Test (South Africa)
