= Charles Harris (cricketer) =

English cricketer

Personal information
- Full name: Chris Harris
- Born: 6 December 1907; Underwood, Nottinghamshire, England
- Batting: Right-handed
- Bowling: Right-arm slow-medium
- Relatives: Brother: GJ Harris

Career statistics
Competition	First-class
Matches	362
Runs scored	18,823
Batting average	35.05
100s/50s	30/106
Top score	239 not out
Balls bowled	19,918
Wickets	196
Bowling average	42.82
5 wickets in innings	3
10 wickets in match	0
Best bowling	8-80
Catches/stumpings	164/0
- Source: Cricket Archive, 19 June 2025

Charles Bowmar Harris (6 December 1907 – 8 August 1954) was an English first-class cricketer who played for Nottinghamshire, chiefly as an opening batsman, in which role he was one of the mainstays of the county side in the 1930s and 1940s, when it declined as the bowling became very weak with the retirement of Larwood and the decline of Voce. Along with Walter Keeton Harris formed one of the best opening partnerships in county cricket at the time, but the presence of players like Herbert Sutcliffe, Len Hutton and Cyril Washbrook meant he had no chance of representative honours ever coming his way.

== Biography ==
Harris was born in Underwood, Nottinghamshire, and first played for Nottinghamshire in 1928, but had no chance of a regular place in the side until 1931 when a motor accident deprived them of the services of Larwood, Sam Staples, and George Vernon Gunn for a month. Although he played no big innings, Harris batted so consistently that, aided by nine not outs, he averaged 50.20 in a very wet summer.

== Career ==
Moreover, with the county's bowling in the absence of their star pacemen as deplorably weak as it was to become near the end of his career, Harris did some valuable work as a slow to medium bowler, taking an impressive eight for 80 against Lancashire. However, once the cracks returned Harris never recaptured that form and was always a last-resource bowler at best, but his batting improved so much that in his first full season of 1932 he reached one thousand runs despite never making more than 67 in any innings, and the following year he shared in the first of many big stands with Keeton, making 277 against Middlesex. He also developed into a classy outfielder with a long throw.

In 1934 Harris scored a personal best 1,891 runs and the following year, despite not scoring a century, was dismissed only eight times for single figures and consequently beat George Ulyett’s long-standing 1883 record for the most runs in a season without reaching 100, scoring 1,709 with a highest score of 92. (This record has since been beaten by David Green in 1965). By this time it was said that Harris could play in a style somewhat similar to his predecessor George Gunn, whereby he would defend as a stonewaller for lengthy periods and then hit boundaries in rapid succession.

Although his consistency remained remarkable up to World War II – in 1937 he hit 1,877 runs without making more than 113 – in the years after the war Harris was plagued by illness and did not play a full season between 1947 and 1949, in spite of which his benefit match against Yorkshire netted him £3,500 despite the loss of the first day to rain. In 1950, he seemed to have recovered his health and scored a career-best 239 not out against Hampshire, in the process batting a full day and hitting thirty-one fours. In 1951, however, Harris declined so badly that he was left out of the team after the county's only win – ironically against Hampshire. Despite being appointed as an umpire the following year, Harris did not stand until 1953 and after one year his health became so bad that he had to resign and died late in the summer at only forty-five. He was one of the characters of the game, noted for his eccentric humour : for example, it was not unknown for him to hang a sign on the stumps saying "Do Not Disturb".

His elder brother, George Harris, played soccer for Mansfield Town and after being rejected by Nottinghamshire, played one first-class game with Glamorgan in 1932.
