= International cricket in 2002–03 =

Cricket season

The 2002–03 international cricket season was from September 2002 to April 2003.

== Season overview ==
International tours
| Start date | Home team | Away team | Results [Matches] | |
| Start date | Home team | Away team | Test | ODI |
|---|---|---|---|---|
| 3 October 2002 | Pakistan | Australia | 0–3 [3] | — |
| 3 October 2002 | South Africa | Bangladesh | 2–0 [2] | 3–0 [3] |
| 9 October 2002 | India | West Indies | 2–0 [3] | 3–4 [7] |
| 7 November 2002 | Australia | England | 4–1 [5] | — |
| 7 November 2002 | Zimbabwe | Pakistan | 0–2 [2] | 0–5 [5] |
| 8 November 2002 | South Africa | Sri Lanka | 2–0 [2] | 4–1 [5] |
| 29 November 2002 | Bangladesh | West Indies | 0–2 [2] | 0–2 [3] |
| 8 December 2002 | South Africa | Pakistan | 2–0 [2] | 4–1 [5] |
| 8 December 2002 | Zimbabwe | Kenya | — | 2–0 [3] |
| 12 December 2002 | New Zealand | India | 2–0 [2] | 5–2 [7] |
International tournaments
| Dates | Tournament | | Winners | |
| 12 September 2002 | (Sri Lanka) 2002 ICC Champions Trophy | | India and Sri Lanka | |
| 13 December 2002 | (Australia) 2002–03 VB Series | | Australia | |
| 9 February 2003 | (South Africa) (Zimbabwe) (Kenya) 2003 Cricket World Cup | | Australia | |
| 3 April 2003 | (United Arab Emirates) Cherry Blossom Sharjah Cup | | Pakistan | |

== September ==
=== ICC Champions Trophy ===
Pool 1
| Team | Played | Won | Lost | NR | Tied | Points | NRR |
|---|---|---|---|---|---|---|---|
| Australia | 2 | 2 | 0 | 0 | 0 | 8 | +3.461 |
| New Zealand | 2 | 1 | 1 | 0 | 0 | 4 | +0.030 |
| Bangladesh | 2 | 0 | 2 | 0 | 0 | 0 | −3.275 |

Pool 2
| Team | Played | Won | Lost | NR | Tied | Points | NRR |
|---|---|---|---|---|---|---|---|
| India | 2 | 2 | 0 | 0 | 0 | 8 | +0.816 |
| England | 2 | 1 | 1 | 0 | 0 | 4 | +0.401 |
| Zimbabwe | 2 | 0 | 2 | 0 | 0 | 0 | −1.125 |

Pool 3
| Team | Played | Won | Lost | NR | Tied | Points | NRR |
|---|---|---|---|---|---|---|---|
| South Africa | 2 | 2 | 0 | 0 | 0 | 8 | +1.856 |
| West Indies | 2 | 1 | 1 | 0 | 0 | 4 | +0.202 |
| Kenya | 2 | 0 | 2 | 0 | 0 | 0 | −2.050 |

Pool 4
| Team | Played | Won | Lost | NR | Tied | Points | NRR |
|---|---|---|---|---|---|---|---|
| Sri Lanka | 2 | 2 | 0 | 0 | 0 | 8 | +2.861 |
| Pakistan | 2 | 1 | 1 | 0 | 0 | 4 | +1.245 |
| Netherlands | 2 | 0 | 2 | 0 | 0 | 0 | −4.323 |

Group stage
| No. | Date | Team 1 | Captain 1 | Team 2 | Captain 2 | Venue | Result |
|---|---|---|---|---|---|---|---|
| ODI 1874 | 12 September | Pakistan | Waqar Younis | Sri Lanka | Sanath Jayasuriya | R Premadasa Stadium, Colombo | Sri Lanka by 8 wickets |
| ODI 1875 | 13 September | West Indies | Carl Hooper | South Africa | Shaun Pollock | Sinhalese Sports Club Ground, Colombo | South Africa by 2 wickets |
| ODI 1876 | 14 September | India | Saurav Ganguly | Zimbabwe | Heath Streak | R Premadasa Stadium, Colombo | India by 14 runs |
| ODI 1877 | 15 September | Australia | Ricky Ponting | New Zealand | Stephen Fleming | Sinhalese Sports Club Ground, Colombo | Australia by 164 runs |
| ODI 1878 | 16 September | Sri Lanka | Sanath Jayasuriya | Netherlands | Roland Lefebvre | R Premadasa Stadium, Colombo | Sri Lanka by 206 runs |
| ODI 1879 | 17 September | West Indies | Carl Hooper | Kenya | Steve Tikolo | Sinhalese Sports Club Ground, Colombo | West Indies by 29 runs |
| ODI 1880 | 18 September | England | Nasser Hussain | Zimbabwe | Heath Streak | R Premadasa Stadium, Colombo | England by 108 runs |
| ODI 1881 | 19 September | Bangladesh | Khaled Mashud | Australia | Ricky Ponting | Sinhalese Sports Club Ground | Australia by 9 wickets |
| ODI 1882 | 20 September | South Africa | Shaun Pollock | Kenya | Steve Tikolo | R Premadasa Stadium, Colombo | South Africa by 176 runs |
| ODI 1883 | 21 September | Netherlands | Roland Lefebvre | Pakistan | Waqar Younis | Sinhalese Sports Club Ground, Colombo | Pakistan by 9 wickets |
| ODI 1884 | 22 September | England | Rashid Latif | India | Saurav Ganguly | R Premadasa Stadium, Colombo | India by 8 wickets |
| ODI 1885 | 23 September | New Zealand | Stephen Fleming | Bangladesh | Khaled Mashud | Sinhalese Sports Club Ground, Colombo | New Zealand by 167 runs |
Semi-finals
| ODI 1886 | 25 September | India | Saurav Ganguly | South Africa | Shaun Pollock | R Premadasa Stadium, Colombo | India by 10 runs |
| ODI 1887 | 27 September | Sri Lanka | Sanath Jayasuriya | Australia | Ricky Ponting | R Premadasa Stadium, Colombo | Sri Lanka by 7 wickets |
Finals
| ODI 1888 | 29 September | Sri Lanka | Sanath Jayasuriya | India | Saurav Ganguly | R Premadasa Stadium, Colombo | No result |
| ODI 1889 | 30 September | Sri Lanka | Sanath Jayasuriya | India | Saurav Ganguly | R Premadasa Stadium, Colombo | No result |

== October ==
=== Australia vs Pakistan in Sri Lanka & United Arab Emirates ===
Test series
| No. | Date | Home captain | Away captain | Venue | Result |
|---|---|---|---|---|---|
| Test 1615 | 3–7 October | Waqar Younis | Steve Waugh | P Sara Oval, Colombo, Sri Lanka | Australia by 41 runs |
| Test 1617 | 11–12 October | Waqar Younis | Steve Waugh | Sharjah Cricket Stadium, Sharjah, UAE | Australia by an innings and 198 runs |
| Test 1620 | 19–22 October | Waqar Younis | Steve Waugh | Sharjah Cricket Stadium, Sharjah, UAE | Australia by an innings and 20 runs |

=== Bangladesh in South Africa ===
ODI series
| No. | Date | Home captain | Away captain | Venue | Result |
|---|---|---|---|---|---|
| ODI 1890 | 3 October | Shaun Pollock | Khaled Mashud | North West Cricket Stadium, Potchefstroom | South Africa by 168 runs |
| ODI 1891 | 6 October | Shaun Pollock | Khaled Mashud | Willowmoore Park, Benoni | South Africa by 10 wickets |
| ODI 1892 | 9 October | Shaun Pollock | Khaled Mashud | De Beers Diamond Oval, Kimberley | South Africa by 7 wickets |
Test series
| No. | Date | Home captain | Away captain | Venue | Result |
| Test 1619 | 18–21 October | Mark Boucher | Khaled Mashud | Buffalo Park, East London, Eastern Cape | South Africa by an innings and 170 runs |
| Test 1621 | 25–27 October | Shaun Pollock | Khaled Mashud | North West Cricket Stadium, Potchefstroom | South Africa by an innings and 160 runs |

=== West Indies in India ===
Test series
| No. | Date | Home captain | Away captain | Venue | Result |
|---|---|---|---|---|---|
| Test 1616 | 9–12 October | Sourav Ganguly | Carl Hooper | Wankhede Stadium, Mumbai | India by an innings and 112 runs |
| Test 1618 | 17–20 October | Sourav Ganguly | Carl Hooper | M. A. Chidambaram Stadium, Chennai | India by 8 wickets |
| Test 1622 | 30 October–3 November | Sourav Ganguly | Carl Hooper | Eden Gardens, Kolkata | Match drawn |
ODI series
| No. | Date | Home captain | Away captain | Venue | Result |
| ODI 1893 | 6 November | Sourav Ganguly | Carl Hooper | Keenan Stadium, Jamshedpur | West Indies by 4 wickets |
| ODI 1894 | 9 November | Sourav Ganguly | Carl Hooper | VCA Ground, Nagpur | West Indies by 7 wickets (D/L) |
| ODI 1895 | 12 November | Sourav Ganguly | Ridley Jacobs | MSC Ground, Rajkot | India by 81 runs (D/L) |
| ODI 1896 | 15 November | Sourav Ganguly | Carl Hooper | Sardar Patel Stadium, Motera, Ahmedabad | India by 5 wickets |
| ODI 1897 | 18 November | Sourav Ganguly | Carl Hooper | IPCL Sports Complex Ground, Vadodara | West Indies by 5 wickets |
| ODI 1898 | 21 November | Rahul Dravid | Carl Hooper | Barkatullah Khan Stadium, Jodhpur | India by 3 wickets |
| ODI 1900 | 24 November | Rahul Dravid | Carl Hooper | Indira Gandhi Stadium, Vijayawada | West Indies by 135 runs |

== November ==
=== England in Australia ===
The Ashes series
| No. | Date | Home captain | Away captain | Venue | Result |
|---|---|---|---|---|---|
| Test 1623 | 7–10 November | Steve Waugh | Nasser Hussain | The Gabba, Brisbane | Australia by 384 runs |
| Test 1628 | 21–24 November | Steve Waugh | Nasser Hussain | Adelaide Oval, Adelaide | Australia by an innings and 51 runs |
| Test 1629 | 29 November–1 December | Steve Waugh | Nasser Hussain | The WACA, Perth | Australia by an innings and 48 runs |
| Test 1634 | 26–30 December | Steve Waugh | Nasser Hussain | MCG, Melbourne | Australia by 5 wickets |
| Test 1636 | 2–6 January | Steve Waugh | Nasser Hussain | SCG, Sydney | England by 225 runs |

=== Pakistan in Zimbabwe ===
Test Series
| No. | Date | Home captain | Away captain | Venue | Result |
|---|---|---|---|---|---|
| 1st Test | 9–12 November | Alistair Campbell | Waqar Younis | Harare Sports Club, Harare | Pakistan by 119 runs |
| 2nd Test | 16–19 November | Alistair Campbell | Waqar Younis | Queens Sports Club, Bulawayo | Pakistan by 10 wickets |
ODI series
| No. | Date | Home captain | Away captain | Venue | Result |
| 1st ODI | 23 November | Alistair Campbell | Waqar Younis | Queens Sports Club, Bulawayo | Pakistan by 7 runs |
| 2nd ODI | 24 November | Alistair Campbell | Waqar Younis | Queens Sports Club, Bulawayo | Pakistan by 104 runs(D/L) |
| 3rd ODI | 27 November | Alistair Campbell | Waqar Younis | Harare Sports Club, Harare | Pakistan by 48 runs |
| 4th ODI | 30 November | Alistair Campbell | Inzamam-ul-Haq | Harare Sports Club, Harare | Pakistan by 8 wickets |
| 5th ODI | 1 December | Alistair Campbell | Inzamam-ul-Haq | Harare Sports Club, Harare | Pakistan by 70 runs |

=== Sri Lanka in South Africa ===
Test series
| No. | Date | Home captain | Away captain | Venue | Result |
|---|---|---|---|---|---|
| 1st Test | 8–10 November | Shaun Pollock | Sanath Jayasuriya | Wanderers Stadium, Johannesburg | South Africa by an innings and 64 runs |
| 2nd Test | 15–19 November | Shaun Pollock | Marvan Atapattu | SuperSport Park, Centurion | South Africa by 3 wickets |
ODI series
| No. | Date | Home captain | Away captain | Venue | Result |
| 1st ODI | 27 November | Shaun Pollock | Sanath Jayasuriya | Wanderers Stadium, Johannesburg | South Africa by 6 wickets |
| 2nd ODI | 29 November | Shaun Pollock | Sanath Jayasuriya | SuperSport Park, Centurion | South Africa by 177 runs |
| 3rd ODI | 1 December | Shaun Pollock | Sanath Jayasuriya | Willowmoore Park, Benoni | Sri Lanka by 7 wickets |
| 4th ODI | 4 December | Shaun Pollock | Sanath Jayasuriya | Diamond Oval, Kimberley | South Africa by 8 wickets |
| 5th ODI | 6 December | Shaun Pollock | Sanath Jayasuriya | Mangaung Oval, Bloemfontein | South Africa by 6 wickets |

=== West Indies in Bangladesh ===
ODI Series
| No. | Date | Home captain | Away captain | Venue | Result |
|---|---|---|---|---|---|
| 1st ODI | 29 November | Khaled Mashud | Ridley Jacobs | MA Aziz Stadium, Chittagong | No result |
| 2nd ODI | 2 December | Khaled Mashud | Ridley Jacobs | Bangabandhu National Stadium, Dhaka | West Indies by 84 runs |
| 3rd ODI | 3 December | Khaled Mashud | Ridley Jacobs | Bangabandhu National Stadium, Dhaka | West Indies by 86 runs |
Test Series
| No. | Date | Home captain | Away captain | Venue | Result |
| 1st Test | 8–10 December | Khaled Mashud | Ridley Jacobs | Bangabandhu National Stadium, Dhaka | West Indies by an innings and 310 runs |
| 2nd Test | 16–18 December | Khaled Mashud | Ridley Jacobs | MA Aziz Stadium, Chittagong | West Indies by 7 wickets |

== December ==
=== Pakistan in South Africa ===
ODI series
| No. | Date | Home captain | Away captain | Venue | Result |
|---|---|---|---|---|---|
| ODI 1914 | 8 December | Shaun Pollock | Waqar Younis | Kingsmead Cricket Ground, Durban | South Africa by 132 runs |
| ODI 1916 | 11 December | Shaun Pollock | Waqar Younis | St George's Park, Port Elizabeth | Pakistan by 182 runs |
| ODI 1918 | 13 December | Shaun Pollock | Waqar Younis | Buffalo Park, East London | South Africa by 62 runs |
| ODI 1921 | 16 December | Shaun Pollock | Waqar Younis | Boland Bank Park, Paarl | South Africa by 9 wickets |
| ODI 1923 | 18 December | Shaun Pollock | Waqar Younis | Newlands Cricket Ground, Cape Town | South Africa by 34 runs |
Test series
| No. | Date | Home captain | Away captain | Venue | Result |
| Test 1635 | 26–29 December | Shaun Pollock | Waqar Younis | Kingsmead Cricket Ground, Durban | South Africa by 10 wickets |
| Test 1637 | 2–5 January | Shaun Pollock | Waqar Younis | Newlands Cricket Ground, Cape Town | South Africa by an innings and 142 runs |

=== Kenya in Zimbabwe ===
ODI series
| No. | Date | Home captain | Away captain | Venue | Result |
|---|---|---|---|---|---|
| ODI 1913 | 8 December | Alistair Campbell | Thomas Odoyo | Harare Sports Club, Harare | No result |
| ODI 1915 | 11 December | Alistair Campbell | Steve Tikolo | Kwekwe Sports Club, Kwekwe | Zimbabwe by 47 runs (D/L) |
| ODI 1920 | 15 December | Alistair Campbell | Steve Tikolo | Queens Sports Club, Bulawayo | Zimbabwe by 9 wickets |

=== India in New Zealand ===
Test series
| No. | Date | Home captain | Away captain | Venue | Result |
|---|---|---|---|---|---|
| Test 1631 | 12–14 December | Stephen Fleming | Saurav Ganguly | Basin Reserve, Wellington | New Zealand by 10 wickets |
| Test 1633 | 19–22 December | Stephen Fleming | Saurav Ganguly | WestpacTrust Stadium, Wellington | New Zealand by 4 wickets |
ODI series
| No. | Date | Home captain | Away captain | Venue | Result |
| ODI 1926 | 26 December | Stephen Fleming | Saurav Ganguly | Eden Park, Auckland | New Zealand by 3 wickets |
| ODI 1927 | 29 December | Stephen Fleming | Saurav Ganguly | McLean Park, Napier | New Zealand by 35 runs |
| ODI 1928 | 1 January | Stephen Fleming | Saurav Ganguly | Jade Stadium, Christchurch | New Zealand by 5 wickets |
| ODI 1929 | 4 January | Stephen Fleming | Saurav Ganguly | WestpacTrust Stadium, Wellington | New Zealand by 7 wickets |
| ODI 1930 | 8 January | Stephen Fleming | Saurav Ganguly | WestpacTrust Stadium, Wellington | India by 2 wickets |
| ODI 1933 | 11 January | Stephen Fleming | Saurav Ganguly | Eden Park, Auckland | India by 1 wicket |
| ODI 1935 | 14 January | Stephen Fleming | Saurav Ganguly | WestpacTrust Stadium, Wellington | New Zealand by 6 wickets |

=== VB Series ===
| Pos | Team | P | W | L | NR | T | NRR | Points |
|---|---|---|---|---|---|---|---|---|
| 1 | Australia | 8 | 7 | 1 | 0 | 0 | 14 | +0.730 |
| 2 | England | 8 | 3 | 5 | 0 | 0 | 6 | −0.023 |
| 3 | Sri Lanka | 8 | 2 | 6 | 0 | 0 | 4 | −0.993 |

Group stage
| No. | Date | Team 1 | Captain 1 | Team 2 | Captain 2 | Venue | Result |
|---|---|---|---|---|---|---|---|
| ODI 1917 | 13 December | Australia | Ricky Ponting | England | Nasser Hussain | Sydney Cricket Ground, Sydney | Australia by 7 wickets |
| ODI 1919 | 15 December | Australia | Ricky Ponting | England | Nasser Hussain | Melbourne Cricket Ground, Melbourne | Australia by 89 runs |
| ODI 1922 | 17 December | England | Nasser Hussain | Sri Lanka | Sanath Jayasuriya | The Gabba, Brisbane | England by 43 runs |
| ODI 1924 | 20 December | England | Nasser Hussain | Sri Lanka | Sanath Jayasuriya | WACA Ground, Perth | England by 95 runs |
| ODI 1925 | 22 December | Australia | Ricky Ponting | Sri Lanka | Sanath Jayasuriya | WACA Ground, Perth | Australia by 142 runs |
| ODI 1931 | 9 January | Australia | Ricky Ponting | Sri Lanka | Sanath Jayasuriya | Sydney Cricket Ground, Sydney | Sri Lanka by 79 runs |
| ODI 1932 | 11 January | Australia | Ricky Ponting | England | Nasser Hussain | Bellerive Oval, Hobart | Australia by 7 runs |
| ODI 1934 | 13 January | England | Nasser Hussain | Sri Lanka | Sanath Jayasuriya | Sydney Cricket Ground, Sydney | Sri Lanka by 31 runs |
| ODI 1936 | 15 January | Australia | Ricky Ponting | Sri Lanka | Sanath Jayasuriya | The Gabba, Brisbane | Australia by 4 wickets |
| ODI 1937 | 17 January | England | Nasser Hussain | Sri Lanka | Sanath Jayasuriya | Adelaide Oval, Adelaide | England by 19 runs |
| ODI 1938 | 19 January | Australia | Adam Gilchrist | England | Nasser Hussain | Adelaide Oval, Adelaide | Australia by 4 wickets |
| ODI 1939 | 21 January | Australia | Ricky Ponting | Sri Lanka | Marvan Atapattu | Melbourne Cricket Ground, Melbourne | Australia by 9 wickets |
Finals
| ODI 1940 | 23 January | Australia | Ricky Ponting | England | Nasser Hussain | Sydney Cricket Ground, Sydney | Australia by 10 wickets |
| ODI 1941 | 25 January | Australia | Ricky Ponting | England | Nasser Hussain | Melbourne Cricket Ground, Melbourne | Australia by 5 runs |

== February ==
=== ICC Cricket World Cup ===
Group A
| Team | Pld | W | L | NR | T | NRR | Pts | PCF |
|---|---|---|---|---|---|---|---|---|
| Australia | 6 | 6 | 0 | 0 | 0 | 2.05 | 24 | 12 |
| India | 6 | 5 | 1 | 0 | 0 | 1.11 | 20 | 8 |
| Zimbabwe | 6 | 3 | 2 | 1 | 0 | 0.50 | 14 | 3.5 |
| England | 6 | 3 | 3 | 0 | 0 | 0.82 | 12 | – |
| Pakistan | 6 | 2 | 3 | 1 | 0 | 0.23 | 10 | – |
| Netherlands | 6 | 1 | 5 | 0 | 0 | −1.45 | 4 | – |
| Namibia | 6 | 0 | 6 | 0 | 0 | −2.96 | 0 | – |

Group B
| Team | Pld | W | L | NR | T | NRR | Pts | PCF |
|---|---|---|---|---|---|---|---|---|
| Sri Lanka | 6 | 4 | 1 | 0 | 1 | 1.20 | 18 | 7.5 |
| Kenya | 6 | 4 | 2 | 0 | 0 | −0.69 | 16 | 10 |
| New Zealand | 6 | 4 | 2 | 0 | 0 | 0.99 | 16 | 4 |
| South Africa | 6 | 3 | 2 | 0 | 1 | 1.73 | 14 | – |
| West Indies | 6 | 3 | 2 | 1 | 0 | 1.10 | 14 | – |
| Canada | 6 | 1 | 5 | 0 | 0 | −1.99 | 4 | – |
| Bangladesh | 6 | 0 | 5 | 1 | 0 | −2.05 | 2 | – |

Super-Six
| Team | Pld | W | L | NR | T | NRR | Pts | PCF |
|---|---|---|---|---|---|---|---|---|
| Australia | 3 | 3 | 0 | 0 | 0 | 1.85 | 24 | 12 |
| India | 3 | 3 | 0 | 0 | 0 | 0.89 | 20 | 8 |
| Kenya | 3 | 1 | 2 | 0 | 0 | 0.35 | 14 | 10 |
| Sri Lanka | 3 | 1 | 2 | 0 | 0 | −0.84 | 11.5 | 7.5 |
| New Zealand | 3 | 1 | 2 | 0 | 0 | −0.90 | 8 | 4 |
| Zimbabwe | 3 | 0 | 3 | 0 | 0 | −1.25 | 3.5 | 3.5 |

Group stage
| No. | Date | Team 1 | Captain 1 | Team 2 | Captain 2 | Venue | Result |
|---|---|---|---|---|---|---|---|
| ODI 1942 | 9 February | South Africa | Shaun Pollock | West Indies | Carl Hooper | Newlands Cricket Ground, Cape Town | West Indies by 3 runs |
| ODI 1943 | 10 February | Zimbabwe | Heath Streak | Namibia | Deon Kotzé | Harare Sports Club, Harare | Zimbabwe by 86 runs (D/L) |
| ODI 1944 | 10 February | New Zealand | Stephen Fleming | Sri Lanka | Sanath Jayasuriya | Goodyear Park, Bloemfontein | Sri Lanka by 47 runs |
| ODI 1945 | 11 February | Australia | Ricky Ponting | Pakistan | Waqar Younis | Wanderers Stadium, Johannesburg | Australia by 82 runs |
| ODI 1946 | 11 February | Bangladesh | Khaled Mashud | Canada | Joe Harris | Sahara Stadium Kingsmead, Durban | Canada by 60 runs |
| ODI 1947 | 12 February | South Africa | Shaun Pollock | Kenya | Steve Tikolo | North West Cricket Stadium, Potchefstroom | South Africa by 10 wickets |
| ODI 1948 | 12 February | India | Saurav Ganguly | Netherlands | Roland Lefebvre | Boland Park, Paarl | India by 68 runs |
| ODI 1948a | 13 February | Zimbabwe | Heath Streak | England | Nasser Hussain | Harare Sports Club, Harare | Zimbabwe by walkover |
| ODI 1949 | 13 February | New Zealand | Stephen Fleming | West Indies | Carl Hooper | St George's Oval, Port Elizabeth | New Zealand by 20 runs |
| ODI 1950 | 14 February | Bangladesh | Khaled Mashud | Sri Lanka | Sanath Jayasuriya | Pietermaritzburg Oval, Pietermaritzburg | Sri Lanka by 10 wickets |
| ODI 1951 | 15 February | Australia | Ricky Ponting | India | Saurav Ganguly | Centurion Park, Centurion | Australia by 9 wickets |
| ODI 1952 | 15 February | Canada | Joe Harris | Kenya | Steve Tikolo | Newlands Cricket Ground, Cape Town | Kenya by 4 wickets |
| ODI 1953 | 16 February | England | Nasser Hussain | Netherlands | Roland Lefebvre | Buffalo Park, East London | England by 6 wickets |
| ODI 1954 | 16 February | Namibia | Deon Kotzé | Pakistan | Waqar Younis | De Beers Diamond Oval, Kimberley | Pakistan by 171 runs |
| ODI 1955 | 16 February | South Africa | Shaun Pollock | New Zealand | Stephen Fleming | Wanderers Stadium, Johannesburg | New Zealand by 9 wickets |
| ODI 1956 | 18 February | Bangladesh | Khaled Mashud | West Indies | Carl Hooper | Willowmoore Park, Benoni | No result |
| ODI 1957 | 19 February | Zimbabwe | Heath Streak | India | Saurav Ganguly | Harare Sports Club, Harare | India by 83 runs |
| ODI 1958 | 19 February | Canada | Joe Harris | Sri Lanka | Sanath Jayasuriya | Boland Park, Paarl | Sri Lanka by 9 wickets |
| ODI 1959 | 19 February | England | Alec Stewart | Namibia | Deon Kotzé | St George's Oval, Port Elizabeth | England by 55 runs |
| ODI 1960 | 20 February | Australia | Ricky Ponting | Netherlands | Roland Lefebvre | North West Cricket Stadium, Potchefstroom | Australia by 75 runs (D/L) |
| ODI 1960a | 21 February | Kenya | Steve Tikolo | New Zealand | Stephen Fleming | Gymkhana Club Ground, Nairobi | Kenya by walkover |
| ODI 1961 | 22 February | South Africa | Shaun Pollock | Bangladesh | Khaled Mashud | Goodyear Park, Bloemfontein | South Africa by 10 wickets |
| ODI 1962 | 22 February | England | Nasser Hussain | Pakistan | Waqar Younis | Newlands Cricket Ground, Cape Town | England by 112 runs |
| ODI 1963 | 23 February | Canada | Joe Harris | West Indies | Carl Hooper | Centurion Park, Centurion | West Indies by 7 wickets |
| ODI 1964 | 23 February | India | Saurav Ganguly | Namibia | Deon Kotzé | Pietermaritzburg Oval, Pietermaritzburg | India by 181 runs |
| ODI 1965 | 24 February | Kenya | Steve Tikolo | Sri Lanka | Sanath Jayasuriya | Gymkhana Club Ground, Nairobi | Kenya by 53 runs |
| ODI 1966 | 24 February | Zimbabwe | Heath Streak | Australia | Ricky Ponting | Queens Sports Club, Bulawayo | Australia by 7 wickets |
| ODI 1967 | 25 February | Netherlands | Roland Lefebvre | Pakistan | Waqar Younis | Boland Park, Paarl | Pakistan by 97 runs |
| ODI 1968 | 26 February | Bangladesh | Khaled Mashud | New Zealand | Stephen Fleming | De Beers Diamond Oval, Kimberley | New Zealand by 7 wickets |
| ODI 1969 | 26 February | England | Nasser Hussain | India | Saurav Ganguly | Sahara Stadium Kingsmead, Durban | India by 82 runs |
| ODI 1970 | 27 February | Australia | Ricky Ponting | Namibia | Deon Kotzé | North West Cricket Stadium, Potchefstroom | Australia by 256 runs |
| ODI 1971 | 27 February | South Africa | Shaun Pollock | Canada | Joe Harris | Buffalo Park, East London | South Africa by 118 runs |
| ODI 1972 | 28 February | Zimbabwe | Heath Streak | Netherlands | Roland Lefebvre | Queens Sports Club, Bulawayo | Zimbabwe by 99 runs |
| ODI 1973 | 28 February | Sri Lanka | Sanath Jayasuriya | West Indies | Carl Hooper | Newlands Cricket Ground, Cape Town | Sri Lanka by 6 runs |
| ODI 1974 | 1 March | Bangladesh | Khaled Mashud | Kenya | Steve Tikolo | Wanderers Stadium, Johannesburg | Kenya by 32 runs |
| ODI 1975 | 1 March | India | Saurav Ganguly | Pakistan | Waqar Younis | Centurion Park, Centurion | India by 6 wickets |
| ODI 1976 | 2 March | Australia | Ricky Ponting | England | Nasser Hussain | St George's Oval, Port Elizabeth | Australia by 2 wickets |
| ODI 1977 | 3 March | Canada | Joe Harris | New Zealand | Stephen Fleming | Willowmoore Park, Benoni | New Zealand by 5 wickets |
| ODI 1978 | 3 March | Namibia | Deon Kotzé | Netherlands | Luuk van Troost | Goodyear Park, Bloemfontein | Netherlands by 64 runs |
| ODI 1979 | 3 March | South Africa | Shaun Pollock | Sri Lanka | Sanath Jayasuriya | Sahara Stadium Kingsmead, Durban | Match tied (D/L) |
| ODI 1980 | 4 March | Zimbabwe | Heath Streak | Pakistan | Waqar Younis | Queens Sports Club, Bulawayo | No result |
| ODI 1981 | 4 March | Kenya | Steve Tikolo | West Indies | Carl Hooper | De Beers Diamond Oval, Kimberley | West Indies by 142 runs |
Super 6
| No. | Date | Team 1 | Captain 1 | Team 2 | Captain 2 | Venue | Result |
| ODI 1982 | 7 March | Australia | Ricky Ponting | Sri Lanka | Sanath Jayasuriya | Centurion Park, Centurion | Australia by 96 runs |
| ODI 1983 | 7 March | India | Saurav Ganguly | Kenya | Steve Tikolo | Newlands Cricket Ground, Cape Town | India by 6 wickets |
| ODI 1984 | 8 March | New Zealand | Stephen Fleming | Zimbabwe | Heath Streak | Goodyear Park, Bloemfontein | New Zealand by 6 wickets |
| ODI 1985 | 10 March | India | Saurav Ganguly | Sri Lanka | Sanath Jayasuriya | Wanderers Stadium, Johannesburg | India by 183 runs |
| ODI 1986 | 11 March | Australia | Ricky Ponting | New Zealand | Stephen Fleming | St George's Oval, Port Elizabeth | Australia by 96 runs |
| ODI 1987 | 12 March | Kenya | Steve Tikolo | Zimbabwe | Heath Streak | Goodyear Park, Bloemfontein | Kenya by 7 wickets |
| ODI 1988 | 14 March | India | Saurav Ganguly | New Zealand | Stephen Fleming | Centurion Park, Centurion | India by 7 wickets |
| ODI 1989 | 15 March | Sri Lanka | Sanath Jayasuriya | Zimbabwe | Heath Streak | Buffalo Park, East London | Sri Lanka by 74 runs |
| ODI 1990 | 15 March | Australia | Ricky Ponting | Kenya | Steve Tikolo | Sahara Stadium Kingsmead, Durban | Australia by 5 wickets |
Semi-finals
| No. | Date | Team 1 | Captain 1 | Team 2 | Captain 2 | Venue | Result |
| ODI 1991 | 18 March | Australia | Ricky Ponting] | Sri Lanka | Sanath Jayasuriya | St George's Oval, Port Elizabeth | Australia by 48 runs (D/L) |
| ODI 1992 | 20 March | India | Saurav Ganguly | Kenya | Steve Tikolo | Sahara Stadium Kingsmead, Durban | India by 91 runs |
Final
| No. | Date | Team 1 | Captain 1 | Team 2 | Captain 2 | Venue | Result |
| ODI 1993 | 23 March | Australia | Ricky Ponting] | India | Saurav Ganguly | Wanderers Stadium, Johannesburg | Australia by 125 runs |

== April ==
=== Cherry Blossom Sharjah Cup ===
| Pos | Team | Pld | W | L | T | NR | Pts | NRR |
|---|---|---|---|---|---|---|---|---|
| 1 | Pakistan | 3 | 3 | 0 | 0 | 0 | 17 | +1.515 |
| 2 | Zimbabwe | 3 | 2 | 1 | 0 | 0 | 10 | -0.347 |
| 3 | Sri Lanka | 3 | 1 | 2 | 0 | 0 | 8 | +0.740 |
| 4 | Kenya | 3 | 0 | 3 | 0 | 0 | 1 | -1.881 |

Group stage
| No. | Date | Team 1 | Captain 1 | Team 2 | Captain 2 | Venue | Result |
|---|---|---|---|---|---|---|---|
| ODI 1994 | 3 April | Pakistan | Rashid Latif | Zimbabwe | Heath Streak | Sharjah Cricket Association Stadium, Sharjah | Pakistan by 69 runs |
| ODI 1995 | 4 April | Sri Lanka | Sanath Jayasuriya | Pakistan | Rashid Latif | Sharjah Cricket Association Stadium, Sharjah | Pakistan by 7 wickets |
| ODI 1996 | 5 April | Kenya | Steve Tikolo | Zimbabwe | Heath Streak | Sharjah Cricket Association Stadium, Sharjah | Zimbabwe by 5 wickets |
| ODI 1997 | 6 April | Sri Lanka | Sanath Jayasuriya | Kenya | Steve Tikolo | Sharjah Cricket Association Stadium, Sharjah | Sri Lanka by 129 runs |
| ODI 1998 | 7 April | Sri Lanka | Sanath Jayasuriya | Zimbabwe | Heath Streak | Sharjah Cricket Association Stadium, Sharjah | Zimbabwe by 4 wickets |
| ODI 1999 | 8 April | Pakistan | Rashid Latif | Kenya | Steve Tikolo | Sharjah Cricket Association Stadium, Sharjah | Pakistan by 143 runs |
Final
| ODI 2000 | 10 April | Zimbabwe | Heath Streak | Pakistan | Rashid Latif | Sharjah Cricket Association Stadium, Sharjah | Pakistan by 8 wickets |
