= Boxing Day Test (South Africa) =

Annual cricket match in South Africa

- Status: Active
- Genre: Sporting event
- Begins: 26 December
- Ends: On or before 30 December
- Frequency: Annual
- Venue: Centurion Park
- Location: Centurion, Gauteng
- Country: South Africa
- Inaugurated: 1913

The Boxing Day Test is a traditional cricket match which is held in South Africa annually.

== History ==
The history of South Africa's Boxing Day Test traces back to 1913, with a match against England in Johannesburg. The tradition became more established after South Africa's return to international cricket in the early 1990s, with the 1992 match against India being a notable milestone.

In 2012, an attempt was made to replace the Test with a T20I format, but it was unsuccessful.

In 2020, the Boxing Test match against Sri Lanka was notably played behind closed doors due to COVID-19 precautions.

On several occasions South Africa has played in Australia's annual Boxing Day Test as the touring side; on such occasions no Boxing Day Test match was held in South Africa.

== Venue ==
The first modern Boxing Day Test was held at St George's Park Cricket Ground in Port Elizabeth in 1992. Two years later, in 1994, the venue shifted to Kingsmead Cricket Ground in Durban. Durban's Kingsmead remained the predominant venue for the event until 2011, when the Test was hosted at Newlands Cricket Ground in Cape Town.

In 2018, the venue was shifted to SuperSport Park in Centurion, reflecting changes in preferences and attendance patterns.

== List of Boxing Day Test matches held in South Africa ==
Boxing Day Test matches held in South Africa
Year	Opposition team	Result	Venue	Ref
1913	England	England won by an innings and 12 runs	Old Wanderers, Johannesburg	
1922	England	South Africa won by 168 runs	Old Wanderers, Johannesburg	
1927	England	England won by 10 wickets	Old Wanderers, Johannesburg	
1930	England	South Africa won by 28 runs	Old Wanderers, Johannesburg	
1935	Australia	Match drawn	Old Wanderers, Johannesburg	
1938	England	Match drawn	Old Wanderers, Johannesburg	
1949	Australia	Australia won by an innings and 85 runs	Ellis Park, Johannesburg	
1953	New Zealand	South Africa won by 132 runs	Ellis Park, Johannesburg	
1956	England	England won by 131 runs	Wanderers Stadium, Johannesburg	
1957	Australia	Match drawn	Wanderers Stadium, Johannesburg	
1961	New Zealand	Match drawn	Wanderers Stadium, Johannesburg	
1964	England	Match drawn	Wanderers Stadium, Johannesburg	
1966	Australia	South Africa won by 233 runs	Wanderers Stadium, Johannesburg	
1992	India	South Africa won by 9 wickets	St George's Park, Port Elizabeth	
1994	New Zealand	South Africa won by 8 wickets	Kingsmead, Durban	
1995	England	Match drawn	St George's Park, Port Elizabeth	
1996	India	South Africa won by 328 runs	Kingsmead, Durban	
1998	West Indies	South Africa won by 9 wickets	Kingsmead, Durban	
1999	England	Match drawn	Kingsmead, Durban	
2000	Sri Lanka	Match drawn	Kingsmead, Durban	
2002	Pakistan	South Africa won by 10 wickets	Kingsmead, Durban	
2003	West Indies	South Africa won by an innings and 65 runs	Kingsmead, Durban	
2004	England	Match drawn	Kingsmead, Durban	
2006	India	South Africa won by 174 runs	Kingsmead, Durban	
2007	West Indies	West Indies won by 128 runs	St George's Park, Port Elizabeth	
2009	England	England won by an innings and 98 runs	Kingsmead, Durban	
2010	India	India won by 87 runs	Kingsmead, Durban	
2011	Sri Lanka	Sri Lanka won by 208 runs	Kingsmead, Durban	
2013	India	South Africa won by 10 wickets	Kingsmead, Durban	
2014	West Indies	Match drawn	St George's Park, Port Elizabeth	
2015	England	England won by 241 runs	Kingsmead, Durban	
2016	Sri Lanka	South Africa won by 206 runs	St George's Park, Port Elizabeth	
2017	Zimbabwe	South Africa won by an innings and 120 runs	St George's Park, Port Elizabeth	
2018	Pakistan	South Africa won by 6 wickets	Centurion Park, Centurion	
2019	England	South Africa won by 107 runs	Centurion Park, Centurion	
2020	Sri Lanka	South Africa won by an innings and 45 runs	Centurion Park, Centurion	
2021	India	India won by 113 runs	Centurion Park, Centurion	
2023	India	South Africa won by an innings and 32 runs	Centurion Park, Centurion	
2024	Pakistan	South Africa won by 2 wickets	Centurion Park, Centurion	

== Overall Record - South Africa vs Visitors ==
Opposition Team	GP	W	D	L	Win %	Recent Test
Australia	4	1	2	1	25.00	Boxing Day 1966
England	13	3	5	5	23.08	Boxing Day 2019
India	7	5	0	2	71.43	Boxing Day 2023
New Zealand	3	2	1	0	66.67	Boxing Day 1994
Pakistan	3	3	0	0	100.00	Boxing Day 2024
Sri Lanka	4	2	1	1	50.00	Boxing Day 2020
West Indies	4	3	1	0	75.00	Boxing Day 2014
Zimbabwe	1	1	0	0	100.00	Boxing Day 2017
Total	38	19	10	9	50.00	Boxing Day 2023

== See also ==
- Boxing Day Test (Australia)
- Boxing Day Test (New Zealand)
- Pink ODI
