= Jackie Botten =

South African cricketer

Personal information
- Full name: James Thomas Botten
- Born: 21 June 1938; Pretoria, Transvaal, South Africa
- Died: 14 May 2006 (aged 67); Lyttelton, Gauteng, South Africa
- Batting: Right-handed
- Bowling: Right-arm fast-medium

International information
- National side: South Africa
- Test debut: 22 July 1965 v England
- Last Test: 26 August 1965 v England

Domestic team information
- Years: Team
- 1957/58–1971/72: North Eastern Transvaal

Career statistics
Competition	Test	First-class
Matches	3	98
Runs scored	65	1,775
Batting average	10.83	15.84
100s/50s	0/0	0/4
Top score	33	90
Balls bowled	828	19,359
Wickets	8	399
Bowling average	42.12	20.36
5 wickets in innings	0	24
10 wickets in match	0	5
Best bowling	2/56	9/23
Catches/stumpings	1/–	52/–
- Source: Cricinfo, 25 October 2020

James Thomas "Jackie" Botten (21 June 1938 – 14 May 2006) was a South African cricketer who played in three Tests in 1965.

Botten was an opening bowler and useful lower-order batsman who played domestic first-class cricket for North Eastern Transvaal from 1957 to 1972. In 1958–59, he was the outstanding bowler in the South African season, with 63 wickets at an average of 10.53. In the match against Griqualand West he took 15 for 49, including a career-best 9 for 23 in the first innings. Nevertheless, North Eastern Transvaal finished last in the B Section of the Currie Cup. In 1963–64, he bowled unchanged through the second innings of the match against Rhodesia to take 9 for 29 off 18.4 overs and dismiss Rhodesia for 47; North Eastern Transvaal still lost, by 18 runs.

Botten toured England in 1961 with the South African Fezela XI of promising young players. He was selected for South Africa's tour of England in 1965 and played in all three Tests. He opened the bowling with Peter Pollock and took eight wickets in a series that South Africa won one-nil. His highest first-class score came in the match against Leicestershire, when batting at number 10 he made 90, putting on 181 runs in 133 minutes with Ali Bacher, a ninth-wicket record for a touring South African team.

He was later a cricket administrator, playing a leading role in the transformation of North Eastern Transvaal into the stronger Northern Transvaal side. He also wrote cricket columns for local papers.

He was also a prominent soccer player for the Arcadia Shepherds in Pretoria. He attended Pretoria Boys High School.
