= George Harris (cricketer, born 1904) =

English cricketer

Personal information
- Full name: George Joseph Harris
- Born: 22 November 1904; Underwood, Nottinghamshire, England
- Died: 28 December 1988 (aged 84); Swansea, Glamorgan, Wales
- Batting: Right-handed
- Bowling: Right-arm medium
- Relatives: Charles Harris (brother)

Domestic team information
- Years: Team
- 1932: Glamorgan

Career statistics
Competition	FC
Matches	1
Runs scored	0
Batting average	0.00
100s/50s	–/–
Top score	0
Balls bowled	–
Wickets	–
Bowling average	–
5 wickets in innings	–
10 wickets in match	–
Best bowling	–
Catches/stumpings	1/–
- Source: Cricinfo, 29 June 2010

George Joseph Harris (22 November 1904 – 28 December 1988) was an English cricketer. Harris was a right-handed batsman who bowled right-arm medium pace. He was born in Underwood, Nottinghamshire and was the older brother of famous Nottinghamshire batsman Charles Harris.

== Cricket career ==
Harris represented Glamorgan in a single first-class match in 1932 against Surrey. In his only first-class innings he was dismissed for a duck by Freddie Brown. In the field he took a single catch.

Prior to his only first-class appearance, Harris had represented his birth county Nottinghamshire in a single match in the 1925 Minor Counties Championship which saw the Nottinghamshire Second XI play the Yorkshire Second XI.

== Football career ==
Harris played football for Mansfield town in the 1920s, where he played as a goalkeeper. In the 1925–26 season, the season in which the team came second in the Midland Counties League. Having previously played for Netherfield Rovers, Harris joined Swansea Town when he moved to Wales, later playing for Briton Ferry Athletic.

== Later life ==
Harris later joined the South Wales Constabulary. He died at Swansea, Glamorgan on 28 December 1988.
