= Anthony Pollock =

South African cricketer (born 1973)

Anthony Graeme Pollock (born 7 April 1973) is a South African former cricketer. Born in Port Elizabeth, Cape Province, he comes from a cricketing family. He is the son of Graeme Pollock and cousin of the all-rounder Shaun Pollock. His brother Andrew also played for Transvaal and Gauteng.
