= Robert Howden =

South African cricketer (1917–2004)

Robert Howden (28 March 1917 – 1 May 2004) was a South African cricketer who made three first-class appearances. He came from a cricketing family. Other members of his family who have played cricket include former South African captains Graeme Pollock (his nephew) and Shaun Pollock (his great nephew).

He was born in Durban, Natal and died in Durban North, KwaZulu-Natal.
