= Boxing Day Test =

Annual cricket match between Australia and a visiting international team

Coordinates: 37°49′12″S 144°59′00″E

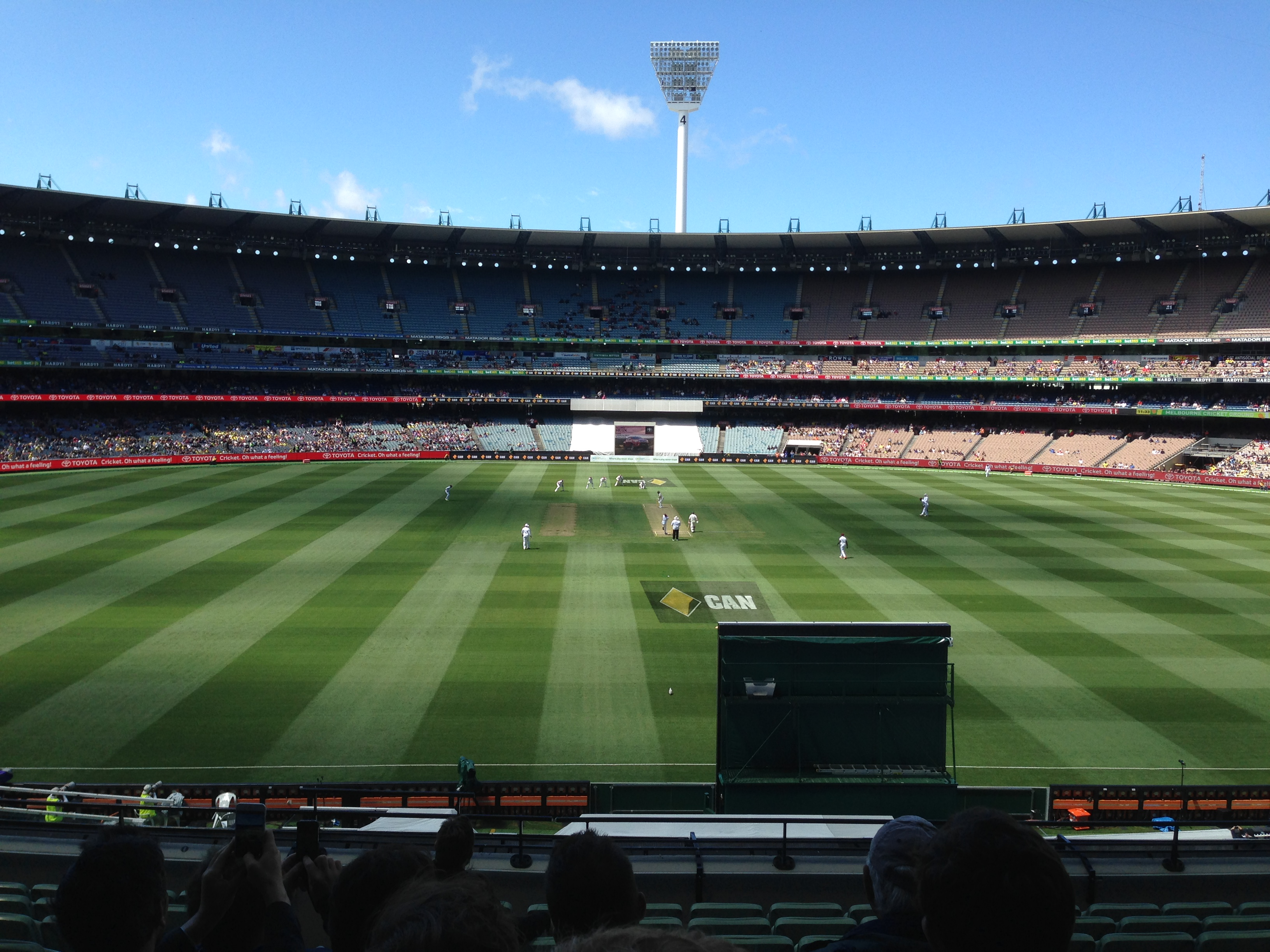
- The Melbourne Cricket Ground during the first day of the 2015 Boxing Day Test match
- Status: Active
- Genre: Sporting event
- Begins: 26 December
- Ends: On or before 30 December
- Frequency: Annual
- Venue: Melbourne Cricket Ground
- Locations: Melbourne, Victoria
- Country: Australia
- Inaugurated: 1968

The Boxing Day Test match is an annual Test cricket match held in Melbourne, Victoria, Australia, involving the Australia national cricket team and an opposing national team that is touring Australia during the southern summer. It begins annually on Boxing Day (26 December) and is played at the Melbourne Cricket Ground (MCG).

== History ==
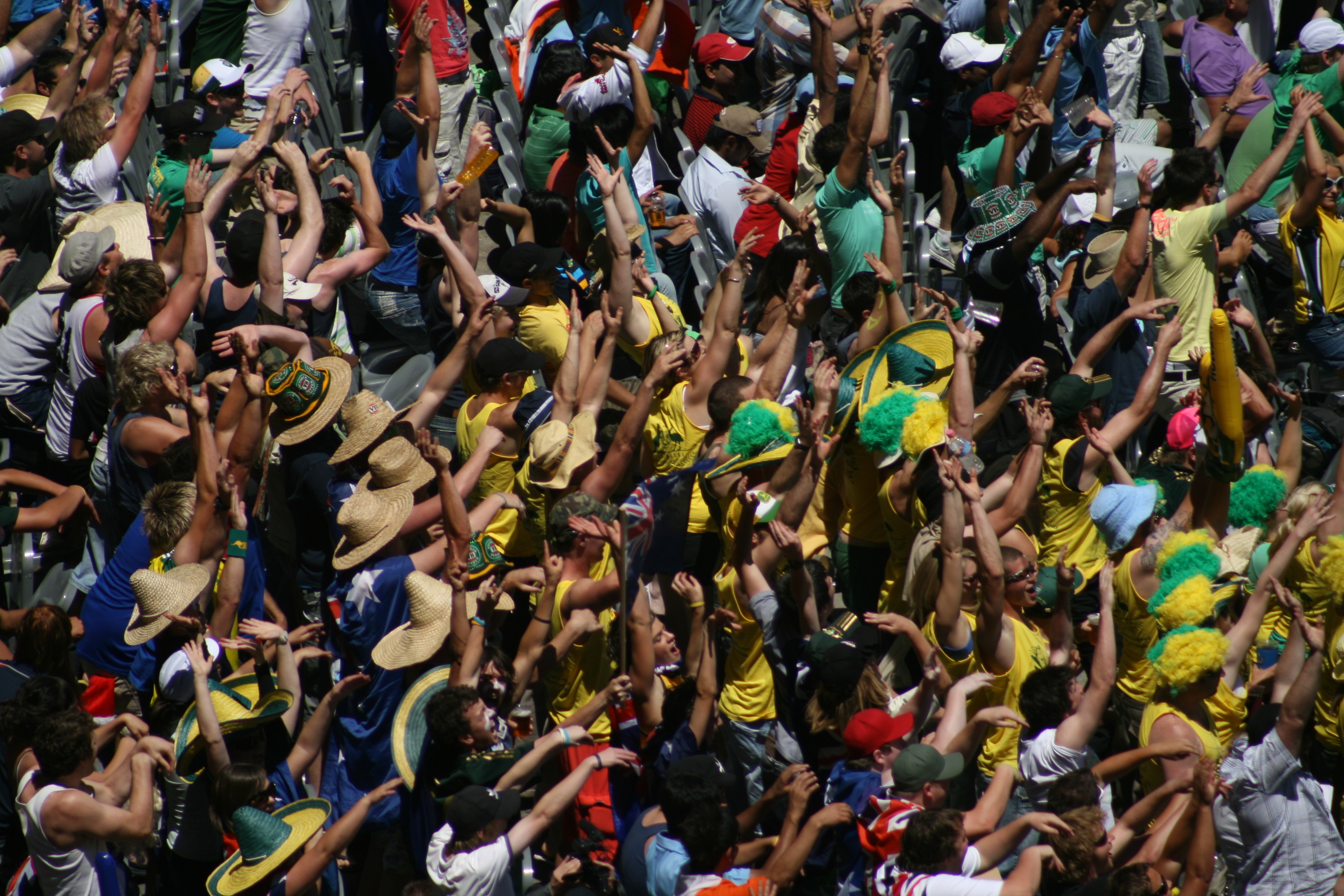
Cricket crowd at the Boxing Day Test in 2007

By long tradition, a Sheffield Shield match between Victoria and New South Wales had been played at the MCG over the Christmas period dating back as far as 1865. It included Boxing Day as one of the scheduled days of play, much to the chagrin of the NSW players who missed spending Christmas with their families as a result. The Melbourne Test was usually held over the New Year period, often starting on 1 January.

During the 1950–51 Ashes series, the Melbourne Test was played from 22 to 27 December, with the fourth day's play being on Boxing Day, but no Test matches were played on Boxing Day in Melbourne between 1953 and 1967. Because there were six Tests in the 1974–75 Ashes series, in order to fit them all in to the overall schedule, the Third Test at Melbourne was scheduled to start on Boxing Day.

That was the origin of the modern tradition, although it was not until 1980 that it was formalised by the Australian Cricket Board, alongside the recent acquisition of its television rights by the Nine Network, and Melbourne emphasising its hosting of major sporting events (such as the AFL Grand Final and Australian Open) to offset the decline of its manufacturing industry.

The Boxing Day Test has cultural significance and often draws large crowds, although increased competition from Twenty20 fixtures in the Big Bash League has led to variance in attendance; the MCG hosted its largest Boxing Day crowd in 2025, the fourth Test of the 2025–26 Ashes series against England.

=== Individual awards ===
Since 1975, there has been an official Player of the Match named in each Boxing Day Test. Since 2020, the man of the match has received the Mullagh Medal, named in honour of Indigenous Australian cricketer Johnny Mullagh.

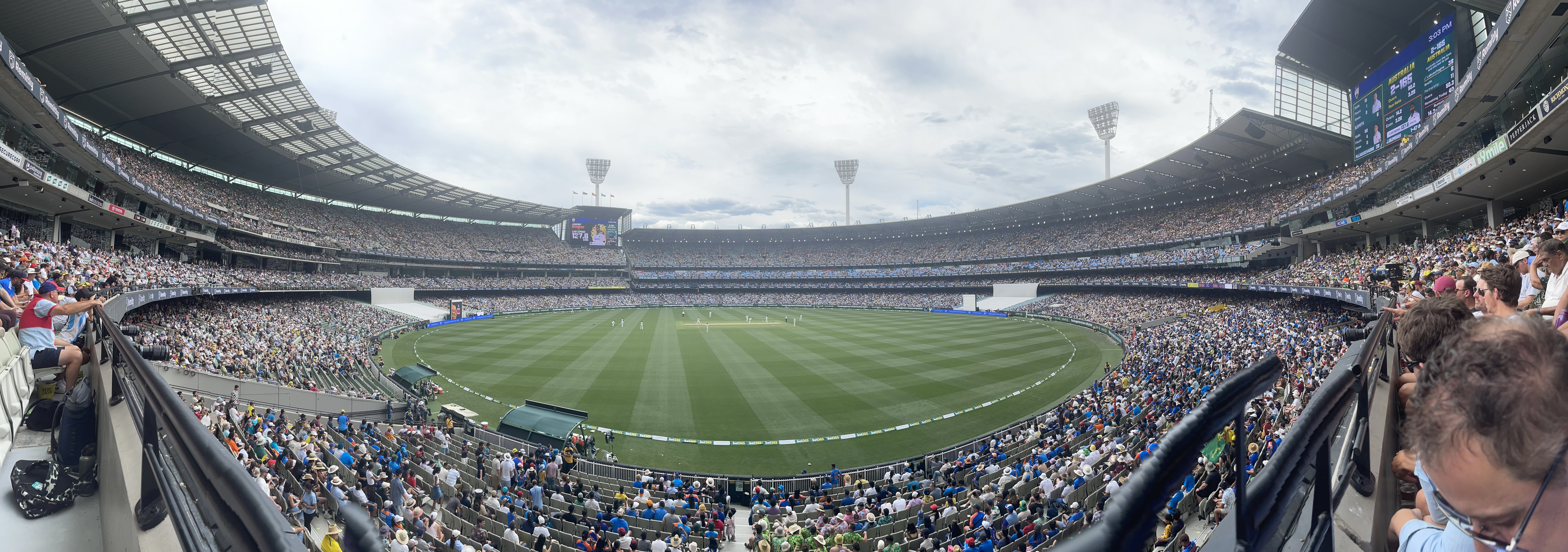
A panorama of the MCG for day one of the 2024 Boxing Day Test.

== List of Boxing Day Test matches ==
Year	Opposition team	Result	Boxing Day Crowd	Total Attendance	Player of the Match: Mullagh Medal
1968	West Indies	Australia won by an innings and 30 runs	18,766	113,376	
1974	England	Draw	77,167	250,750	
1975	West Indies	Australia won by 8 wickets	85,661	222,755	(Australia) Jeff Thomson
1980	New Zealand	Draw	28,671	82,745	(New Zealand) Richard Hadlee
1981	West Indies	Australia won by 58 runs	39,982	134,081	(Australia) Kim Hughes
1982	England	England won by 3 runs	63,900	214,882	(England) Norman Cowans
1983	Pakistan	Draw	40,277	111,611	(Australia) Graham Yallop
1985	India	Draw	18,146	77,715	(Australia) Allan Border
1986	England	England won by an innings and 14 runs	58,203	107,817	(England) Gladstone Small
1987	New Zealand	Draw	51,807	127,184	(New Zealand) Richard Hadlee
1990	England	Australia won by 9 wickets	49,763	129,530	(Australia) Bruce Reid
1991	India	Australia won by 8 wickets	42,494	89,369	(Australia) Bruce Reid
1992	West Indies	Australia won by 139 runs	28,397	83,320	(Australia) Shane Warne
1993	South Africa	Draw	15,604 (Note: It rained on Boxing Day.)	48,565	(Australia) Mark Taylor
1995	Sri Lanka	Australia won by 10 wickets	55,239	105,388	(Australia) Glenn McGrath
1996	West Indies	West Indies won by 6 wickets	72,891	131,671	(Cricket West Indies) Curtly Ambrose
1997	South Africa	Draw	73,812	160,182	(South Africa) Jacques Kallis
1998	England	England won by 12 runs	61,580	159,031	(England) Dean Headley
1999	India	Australia won by 180 runs	49,082	134,554	(India) Sachin Tendulkar
2000	West Indies	Australia won by 352 runs	73,233	133,299	(Australia) Steve Waugh
2001	South Africa	Australia won by 9 wickets	61,796	153,025	(Australia) Matthew Hayden
2002	England	Australia won by 5 wickets	64,189 (Note: Capacity of ground reduced due to redevelopment for the Melbourne 2006 Commonwealth Games.)	177,658	(Australia) Justin Langer
2003	India	Australia won by 9 wickets	62,613	179,662	(Australia) Ricky Ponting
2004	Pakistan	Australia won by 9 wickets	61,552	129,079	(Australia) Damien Martyn
2005	South Africa	Australia won by 184 runs	71,910	192,338	(Australia) Michael Hussey
2006	England	Australia won by an innings and 99 runs	89,155	244,351	(Australia) Shane Warne
2007	India	Australia won by 337 runs	68,465	166,663	(Australia) Matthew Hayden
2008	South Africa	South Africa won by 9 wickets	63,263	174,246	(South Africa) Dale Steyn
2009	Pakistan	Australia won by 170 runs	59,206	156,267	(Australia) Shane Watson
2010	England	England won by an innings and 157 runs	84,345	240,156	(England) Jonathan Trott
2011	India	Australia won by 122 runs	70,068	189,347	(Australia) James Pattinson
2012	Sri Lanka	Australia won by an innings and 201 runs	67,138	137,455	(Australia) Mitchell Johnson
2013	England	Australia won by 8 wickets	91,112	271,865	(Australia) Mitchell Johnson
2014	India	Draw	69,993	194,481	(Australia) Ryan Harris
2015	West Indies	Australia won by 177 runs	53,389	127,069	(Australia) Nathan Lyon
2016	Pakistan	Australia won by an innings and 18 runs	63,478	142,188	(Australia) Steve Smith
2017	England	Draw	88,173	261,335	(England) Alastair Cook
2018	India	India won by 137 runs	73,516	176,539	(India) Jasprit Bumrah
2019	New Zealand	Australia won by 247 runs	80,473	203,472	(Australia) Travis Head
2020	India	India won by 8 wickets	27,615 (Note: A maximum of 30,000 people were allowed to attend each day due to the COVID-19 pandemic.)	89,472	(India) Ajinkya Rahane
2021	England	Australia won by an innings and 14 runs	57,100	140,671	(Australia) Scott Boland
2022	South Africa	Australia won by an innings and 182 runs	64,876	155,714	(Australia) David Warner
2023	Pakistan	Australia won by 79 runs	62,167	164,835	(Australia) Pat Cummins
2024	India	Australia won by 184 runs	87,242	373,691	(Australia) Pat Cummins
2025	England	England won by 4 wickets	94,119	186,244	(England) Josh Tongue
2026	New Zealand				
2027	Pakistan				
2028	India				
2029	England				

- In 1989, instead of a Test match, a One Day International was held on 26 December at the Melbourne Cricket Ground between Australia and Sri Lanka. Australia won by 30 runs in front of a crowd of 45,012.

== Overall Record — Australia vs Visitors ==
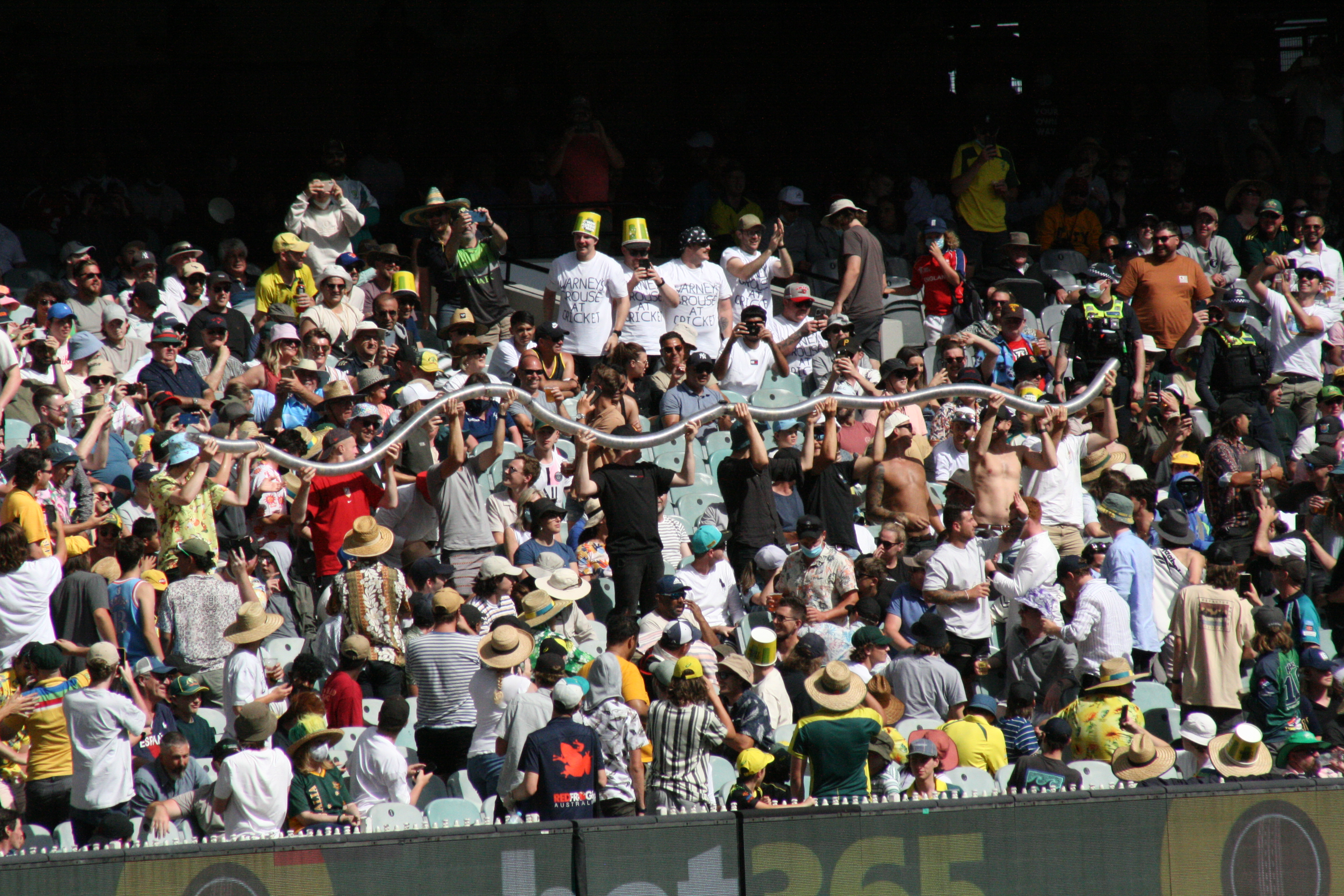
Beer cup snake during the 2021 Boxing Day Test

Opposition Team	GP	W	D	L	Win %	Recent Test
England	12	5	2	5	41.67	Boxing Day 2025
India	10	2	2	6	20.00	Boxing Day 2024
New Zealand	3	0	2	1	0.00	Boxing Day 2019
Pakistan	5	0	1	4	0.00	Boxing Day 2023
South Africa	6	1	2	3	16.67	Boxing Day 2022
Sri Lanka	2	0	0	2	0.00	Boxing Day 2012
West Indies	7	1	0	6	14.29	Boxing Day 2015
Total	45	9	9	27	20.00	Boxing Day 2025

== See also ==
- Boxing Day Test (South Africa)
- Boxing Day Test (New Zealand)
