= Boxing Day Test (New Zealand) =

Annual cricket match between New Zealand and a visiting international team

- Status: Active
- Genre: Sporting event
- Begins: 26 December
- Ends: On or before 30 December
- Venue: Basin Reserve (1998–2003); Hagley Oval (2014–2018); Bay Oval (2020)
- Locations: Bay Oval, Mount Maunganui
- Country: New Zealand
- Inaugurated: 1998

The Boxing Day Test is a cricket Test match held in New Zealand, involving the New Zealand national cricket team against a touring side.

== History ==
The inaugural Boxing Day Test took place in 1998 at Basin Reserve, featuring a match against India and highlighted by Simon Doull's bowling figures of 7-65.

In 1999, New Zealand faced the West Indies in a Boxing Day Test, with Matthew Sinclair scoring a double century on his Test debut.

In 2000, the third Boxing Day Test at Basin Reserve between New Zealand and Zimbabwe concluded in a draw, largely attributed to a lifeless pitch which hindered scoring.

In 2001, the Boxing Day Test was played between New Zealand and Bangladesh, which New Zealand won by an innings margin.

In 2002, the Boxing Day Test was cancelled due to preparations for the 2003 Cricket World Cup and was replaced by an ODI cricket match.

In 2003, after a year's hiatus, the Boxing Day Test featured New Zealand against Pakistan. The match resulted in New Zealand's first loss in a home Boxing Day Test, mainly due to an 11-wicket haul from Shoaib Akhtar.

From 2004 to 2013, the Boxing Day Test was not held, as New Zealand Cricket prioritized limited-overs fixtures during the holiday period due to scheduling preferences and diminishing Test attendances. During this period, ODIs and T20Is replaced the Boxing Day Test.

In 2014, the Boxing Day Test returned at Hagley Oval in Christchurch, a shift from its traditional venue, to facilitate an uninterrupted sequence of ODIs before the 2015 Cricket World Cup. The notable event of the 2014 Test was New Zealand captain Brendon McCullum's innings of 195 runs from 134 balls against Sri Lanka, setting a national record for the fastest century at the time.

From 2015 to 2017, Christchurch's Hagley Oval hosted One Day Internationals for the Boxing Day event. In 2018, New Zealand Cricket reintroduced the Boxing Day Test at the same venue, marking a return to the longer format.

In 2020, Boxing Day Test match was hosted by Bay Oval in Mt Maunganui.

On several occasions, New Zealand has played as the touring side in Australia's or South Africa's annual Boxing Day Test matches, and on such occasions no Test was held in New Zealand. In addition, in December 2022, during New Zealand's tour of Pakistan, the first Test of the series in Karachi began on Boxing Day, and was dubbed a 'Boxing Day Test' by some media in New Zealand.

== List of Boxing Day Test matches held in New Zealand ==
| Year | Opposition team | Result | Venue | Ref |
|---|---|---|---|---|
| 1998 | India | New Zealand won by 4 wickets | Basin Reserve, Wellington | |
| 1999 | West Indies | New Zealand won by an innings and 105 runs | Basin Reserve, Wellington | |
| 2000 | Zimbabwe | Match drawn | Basin Reserve, Wellington | |
| 2001 | Bangladesh | New Zealand won by an innings and 74 runs | Basin Reserve, Wellington | |
| 2003 | Pakistan | Pakistan won by 7 wickets | Basin Reserve, Wellington | |
| 2014 | Sri Lanka | New Zealand won by 8 wickets | Hagley Oval, Christchurch | |
| 2018 | Sri Lanka | New Zealand won by 423 runs | Hagley Oval, Christchurch | |
| 2020 | Pakistan | New Zealand won by 101 runs | Bay Oval, Mount Maunganui | |

== List of Boxing Day matches held in New Zealand (excluding Test matches) ==
| Year | Format | Opposition team | Result | Venue | Ref |
|---|---|---|---|---|---|
| 1992 | ODI | Pakistan | Pakistan won by 50 runs | Basin Reserve, Wellington | |
| 2002 | ODI | India | New Zealand won by 3 wickets | Eden Park, Auckland | |
| 2004 | ODI | Sri Lanka | New Zealand won by 7 wickets | Eden Park, Auckland | |
| 2006 | T20I | Sri Lanka | New Zealand won by 5 wickets | Eden Park, Auckland | |
| 2007 | ODI | Bangladesh | New Zealand won by 6 wickets | Eden Park, Auckland | |
| 2008 | T20I | West Indies | Match tied; West Indies won the one-over eliminator | Eden Park, Auckland | |
| 2010 | T20I | Pakistan | New Zealand won by 5 wickets | Eden Park, Auckland | |
| 2013 | ODI | West Indies | West Indies won by 2 wickets | Eden Park, Auckland | |
| 2015 | ODI | Sri Lanka | New Zealand won by 7 wickets | Hagley Oval, Christchurch | |
| 2016 | ODI | Bangladesh | New Zealand won by 77 runs | Hagley Oval, Christchurch | |
| 2017 | ODI | West Indies | New Zealand won by 66 runs (DLS) | Hagley Oval, Christchurch | |

== See also ==
- Boxing Day Test (Australia)
- Boxing Day Test (South Africa)
