= David Green (cricketer, born 1939) =

Welsh cricketer

Personal information
- Full name: David Michael Green
- Born: 10 November 1939; Llanengan, Caernarfonshire, Wales
- Died: 19 March 2016 (aged 76); Devon, England
- Batting: Right-handed
- Bowling: Right-arm medium-pace
- Role: Batsman

Domestic team information
- Years: Team
- 1959–61: Oxford University
- 1959–67: Lancashire
- 1968–73: Gloucestershire
- First-class debut: 2 May 1959 Oxford University v Gloucestershire
- Last First-class: 2 October 1972 International Wanderers v Rhodesia
- List A debut: 27 May 1964 Lancashire v Kent
- Last List A: 24 June 1973 Gloucestershire v Kent

Career statistics
Competition	First-class	List A
Matches	266	65
Runs scored	13381	1706
Batting average	28.83	26.65
100s/50s	14/78	1/9
Top score	233	127*
Balls bowled	9542	1796
Wickets	116	48
Bowling average	38.44	22.95
5 wickets in innings	1	–
10 wickets in match	–	–
Best bowling	5/61	4/21
Catches/stumpings	97/–	14/–
- Source: CricketArchive, 19 January 2014

David Michael Green (10 November 1939 – 19 March 2016) was a Welsh first-class cricketer who played for Oxford University, Lancashire and Gloucestershire.

Green was born at Llanengan, Caernarfonshire, in Wales. A fair-haired right-handed batsman often used as an opener and a medium-pace bowler, he went to Brasenose College, Oxford, from Manchester Grammar School and was a regular and successful player for three years from 1959 to 1961, turning out for Lancashire in his holidays. He scored 1,000 runs in his first season, but failed to do so in his other two university seasons, and again in 1962, when he played fairly often for Lancashire.

After a year away playing in league cricket in 1963, he came back to Lancashire in 1964 and was a regular in the first team for three seasons. In 1965, with the benefit of playing in 35 first-class matches, he set a record that is unlikely ever to be beaten by scoring more than 2,000 runs without a single century: his highest for the season was 85. The previous highest number of runs in a season without a century was 1,709 by C.B. Harris in 1935, whilst not since 1970 has anyone scored 1,500 runs with no centuries in one season. After a more moderate season in 1966, he was injured and drifted out of the side in 1967, and was allowed to leave Lancashire at the end of the season to join Gloucestershire.

Green's aggressive batting in 1968 for his new county had him belatedly touted as a possible England opener: he scored 2,137 runs at an average of more than 40 runs per innings. In the event, the only honour he received was to be selected as a Wisden Cricketer of the Year in 1969. After two more modest seasons in 1969 and 1970, he gave up first-class cricket for a career in business and journalism, writing on cricket and rugby for The Daily Telegraph from 1982 to 2009.

He also played rugby union for Sale R.F.C.

Green died on 19 March 2016, at the age of 76.
