= Richard Dumbrill (cricketer) =

South African cricketer

- Dumbrill in 2006

Personal information
- Born: 19 November 1938 (age 87); Wandsworth, Surrey, England
- Batting: Right-handed
- Bowling: Right-arm medium

International information
- National side: South Africa
- Test debut: 22 July 1965 v England
- Last Test: 31 December 1966 v Australia

Domestic team information
- Years: Team
- 1960/61–1966/67: Natal
- 1965/66–1967/68: Transvaal

Career statistics
Competition	Test	First-class
Matches	5	51
Runs scored	153	1,761
Batting average	15.30	23.48
100s/50s	0/0	0/13
Top score	36	94
Balls bowled	816	6,888
Wickets	9	132
Bowling average	37.33	22.03
5 wickets in innings	0	5
10 wickets in match	0	1
Best bowling	4/30	5/34
Catches/stumpings	3/–	35/–
- Source: Cricinfo, 15 November 2022

Richard Dumbrill (born 19 November 1938) is a former South African cricketer who played in five Test matches between July 1965 and January 1967.

Dumbrill attended Durban High School and played cricket for the South African Schools XI in 1957. He made his first-class debut for Natal in the Currie Cup in the 1960–61 season as a lower middle-order batsman and medium-pace bowler, taking six wickets against Orange Free State.

Dumbrill was selected to tour England in 1965, and played in all three Tests. In his first Test, he took 3 for 31 and 4 for 30 against England at Lord's.

Dumbrill's best first-class bowling figures were 5 for 36 and 5 for 38 for Transvaal against North Eastern Transvaal in 1967–68, his final season. His highest score was 94, the highest score in the match, when Natal beat Eastern Province by an innings in 1963–64.

Following his cricket career, Dumbrill emigrated from South Africa to the United States where he married and had two children. He currently lives in the Boston area.
