= Shaun Pollock =

South African cricketer (born 1973)

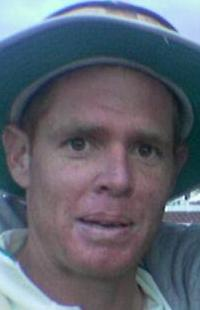
- Pollock c. 2005

Personal information
- Full name: Shaun Maclean Pollock
- Born: 16 July 1973 (age 53); Port Elizabeth, Cape Province, South Africa
- Nickname: Polly
- Height: 186 cm (6 ft 1 in)
- Batting: Right-handed
- Bowling: Right arm fast-medium
- Role: All-rounder
- Relatives: Andrew Pollock (grandfather); Peter Pollock (father); Graeme Pollock (uncle)

International information
- National side: South Africa (1995–2008)
- Test debut (cap 261): 16 November 1995 v England
- Last Test: 10 January 2008 v West Indies
- ODI debut (cap 39): 9 January 1996 v England
- Last ODI: 3 February 2008 v West Indies
- ODI shirt no.: 7
- T20I debut (cap 10): 21 October 2005 v New Zealand
- Last T20I: 18 January 2008 v West Indies
- T20I shirt no.: 7

Domestic team information
- Years: Team
- 1992/93–2003/04: KwaZulu-Natal
- 1996–2002: Warwickshire
- 2004/05: Dolphins
- 2008: Mumbai Indians
- 2008: Durham

Career statistics
Competition	Test	ODI	FC	LA
Matches	108	303	186	435
Runs scored	3,781	3,519	7,021	5,494
Batting average	32.31	26.45	33.11	26.66
100s/50s	2/16	1/14	6/35	3/24
Top score	111	130	150*	134*
Balls bowled	24,353	15,712	39,067	21,588
Wickets	421	393	667	573
Bowling average	23.11	24.50	23.25	22.93
5 wickets in innings	16	5	22	7
10 wickets in match	1	0	2	0
Best bowling	7/87	6/35	7/33	6/21
Catches/stumpings	72/–	108/–	132/–	153/–
Medal record
Representing South Africa
Men's Cricket
Commonwealth Games
Gold medal – first place	1998 Kuala Lumpur	List-A cricket
- Source: CricketArchive, 20 September 2016

Shaun Maclean Pollock OIS (born 16 July 1973) is a South African cricket commentator and former cricketer, who was captain in all formats of the game. A bowling all-rounder, Pollock along with Allan Donald formed a bowling partnership for many years. From 2000 to 2003 he was the captain of the South African cricket team, and also played for Africa XI, World XI, Dolphins and Warwickshire. He was chosen as the Wisden Cricketer of the Year in 2003. Pollock was a member of the South Africa team that won the 1998 ICC KnockOut Trophy, the first ICC trophy the country has won.

On 11 January 2008 he announced his retirement from all forms of international cricket after his 303rd One Day International on 3 February. Pollock now works as a commentator on SuperSport's coverage of South African cricket as well in the ICC Tournaments Such as ICC Champions Trophy, ICC T20 World Cup, ICC Cricket World Cup and World Test Championship WTC.

In November 2021, he was inducted to the ICC Cricket Hall of Fame.

== International career ==
=== Prominence ===
He is joint 10th in the all-time best ever bowler ratings in the ICC Ratings, and has taken over 400 wickets and at the time of his retirement was one of only six players to have scored 3000 runs and taken 300 wickets in Test matches.

In June 2007 he represented an Africa XI in an ODI game against an Asia XI in Bangalore. Playing as a specialist batsman, Pollock scored 130 from number 7 in the batting order, the highest ever score by an ODI batsman in that position. The record would however not last long, MS Dhoni bettered it later in the series. In 2007, he received the SA Player's Player award and the SA ODI Player of the Year Award.

He was the leading wicket taker for South Africa in Tests until Dale Steyn overtook him on 26 December 2018. He took over 400 test wickets and scored over 3,700 test runs in his 108 Test matches.

=== Captaincy ===
Shaun Pollock was a bowling all-rounder. After Hansie Cronje was banned from cricket for life, Pollock took over the captaincy in April 2000. He was eventually removed from the captaincy after South Africa's performance in the 2003 Cricket World Cup.

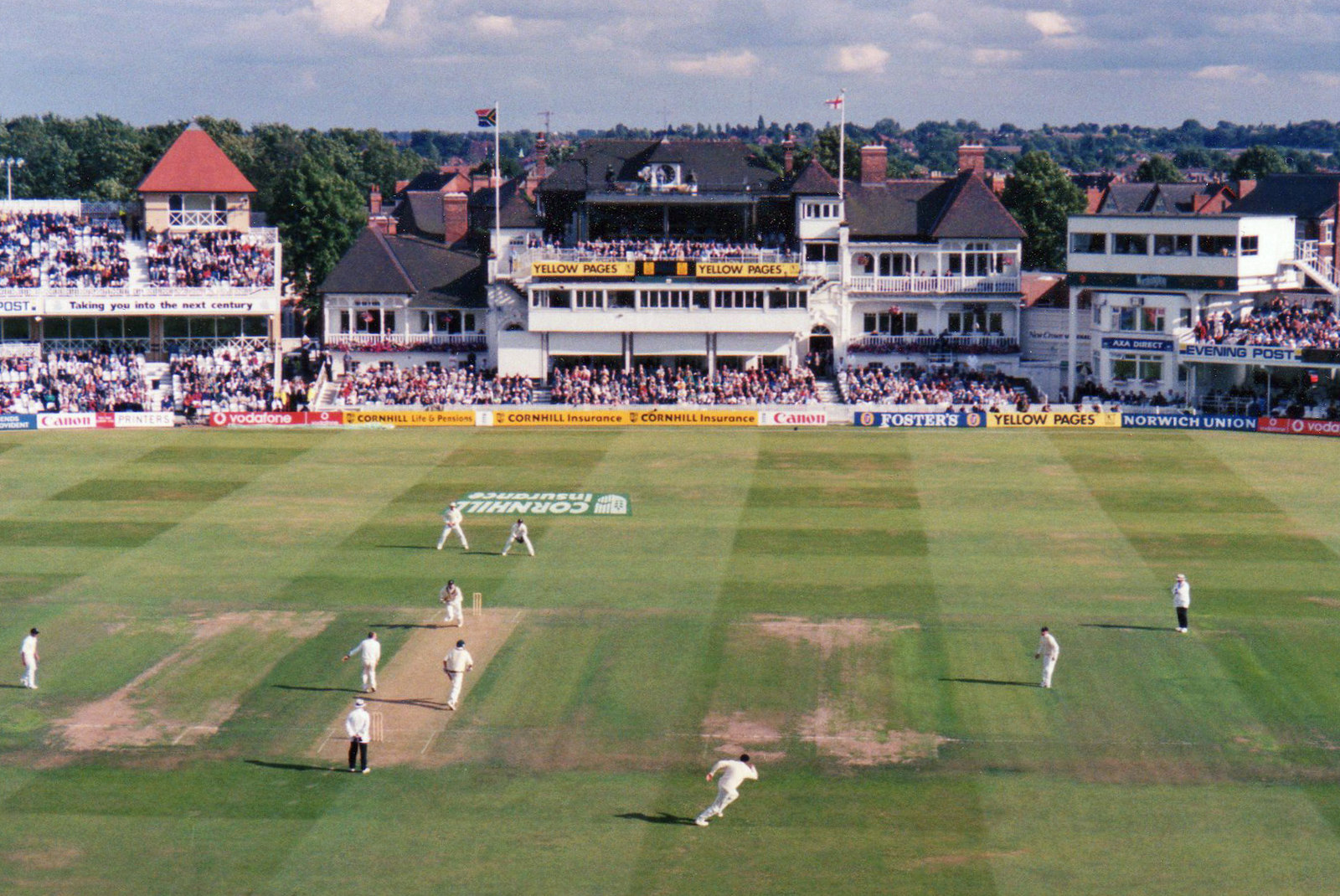
Pollock batting for South Africa in 1998 at Trent Bridge

Although no longer captain, he retained his place in the team. After a disappointing Test series tour of Australia in 2005/2006, he faced criticism for losing his wicket taking ability. He has the lowest (best) economy rate of any bowler to have taken 300 ODI wickets, and he is also the first South African and only the tenth player to take 400 Test wickets. In September 2007 he was dropped from the South African test team for the first time in his career. Pollock was later readded to the test series against the West Indies, whereupon he announced his retirement, effective on 3 February 2008. He stated that "I realise I have been blessed by God and feel I have nurtured my talents to the best of my abilities." After South Africa sealed a series victory against the West Indies, Graeme Smith paid tribute to Pollock, stating "It's very important that people celebrate what he's given to South African cricket and what he's achieved as an individual."

== Domestic career ==
Pollock took four wickets in four balls on his first appearance for Warwickshire – in a limited-overs (B&H Cup) game v Leicestershire at Birmingham in 1996.

A graph showing Pollock's test career bowling statistics and how they have varied over time.

In Summer 2008 Pollock represented Mumbai Indians in the Indian Premier League, and Durham Dynamos in the 2008 Twenty20 Cup in England. He played for Durham County Cricket Club in the North East of England and along with fellow South African Albie Morkel was used mainly in the Twenty20 Cup competition.

Of the 18 players who have bowled at least 2,000 balls for South Africa in ODIs, Pollock's economy rate of 3.65 runs per over was the second best behind that of Fanie de Villiers.

== Records ==
- Shaun Pollock has the record for the most Test centuries while batting at number 9 or below (2).
- He also holds the record for playing the most ODI innings before scoring a century (189).
- Shaun Pollock also holds the record for becoming the first test captain to be stranded or to be remained unbeaten on 99 in a test innings.
- He too holds the record for taking the most ODI wickets when playing at home soil (193).
- Shaun Pollock holds the record for bowling most Maiden overs in ODI history (313).

== Personal life ==
Pollock comes from a family of mainly Scottish ancestry. His paternal grandfather, Andrew Pollock, who played for Orange Free State, was born in Edinburgh. He attended Northwood School in Durban, KwaZulu-Natal. He is married with two daughters. His wife was a finalist in the Miss South Africa pageant in the early '90s and worked for a South African telecom company. He is a teetotaler and a devout Christian. Pollock is a graduate of the University of Natal with a bachelor's degree in commerce.

Preceded by Hansie Cronje	South African Test cricket captain 2000/1–2001/2	Succeeded by Mark Boucher
Preceded by Mark Boucher	South African Test cricket captain 2001/2–2002/3	Succeeded by Graeme Smith
Preceded by Hansie Cronje	South African ODI cricket captain 2000–2005	Succeeded by Graeme Smith
