= Peter Pollock =

South African cricketer

Personal information
- Full name: Peter Maclean Pollock
- Born: 30 June 1941 (age 85); Pietermaritzburg, Natal, South Africa
- Nickname: Pooch
- Height: 191 cm (6 ft 3 in)
- Batting: Right-handed
- Bowling: Right-arm fast
- Role: All rounder
- Relatives: Andrew Maclean Pollock (father); Graeme Pollock (brother); Shaun Pollock (son)

International information
- National side: South Africa
- Test debut (cap 210): 8 December 1961 v New Zealand
- Last Test: 5 March 1970 v Australia

Domestic team information
- Years: Team
- 1958/59–1971/72: Eastern Province

Career statistics
| Competition | Test | First-class |
|---|---|---|
| Matches | 28 | 127 |
| Runs scored | 607 | 3,028 |
| Batting average | 21.67 | 22.59 |
| 100s/50s | 0/2 | 0/12 |
| Top score | 75* | 79 |
| Balls bowled | 6,522 | 19,064 |
| Wickets | 116 | 485 |
| Bowling average | 24.18 | 21.89 |
| 5 wickets in innings | 9 | 27 |
| 10 wickets in match | 1 | 2 |
| Best bowling | 6/38 | 7/19 |
| Catches/stumpings | 9/– | 54/– |
- Source: Cricinfo, 5 December 2019

Peter Maclean Pollock (born 30 June 1941) is a retired South African cricketer. He has played a continuing role in the South Africa cricket team as a player and selector. He was voted a Wisden Cricketer of the Year in 1966. He was primarily a fast bowler, but was also a useful late-order batsman.

== Family and personal life ==
Pollock is of Scottish ancestry through his father Andrew Pollock, who was born in Edinburgh to a minister and moved to present-day South Africa. Peter's brother, Graeme Pollock, an acclaimed left hand batsman, was a regular player for the South African cricket team at the same time as Peter, and two of his nephews also played first-class cricket, both for Transvaal and Leicestershire amongst other teams. His son, Shaun Pollock, played 108 Tests and over 300 ODIs for South Africa, and is widely regarded as one of the finest all-rounders to ever play the game.

Peter attended Grey High School, a school famous for its sporting achievements, with his brother Graeme.

== Career ==
On his Test debut, Pollock took six wickets in the second innings against New Zealand in Durban in 1961. He was South Africa's leading bowler in the 1960s, playing every Test between 1962 and 1970.

Perhaps the highlight of his career came alongside that of his brother when they were both playing in a Test match at Trent Bridge in 1965. Peter took ten wickets in the match with innings figures of 5 for 53 and 5 for 34, while his brother Graeme, batting, made 125 and 59. South Africa won the match, and with it the three-Test series. Peter and Graeme were leading figures involved in the famous Walk-off at Newlands in 1971 as a protest against apartheid and political interference in cricket.

== Post-retirement ==
Pollock was convenor of selectors for South Africa in the 1990s, immediately following their re-admittance into world cricket after the end of apartheid. He is often credited with establishing the work ethic and style of play (based on tight fast bowling) that led to the team rapidly rising to become one of the top two teams in the game. Later, he led calls for the famous fast bowler Allan Donald to retire from the game when that player became very injury-prone as he got on in years. Pollock is an Honorary Life Member of the MCC.

Outside cricket, Pollock was a journalist and company director and is now an international evangelist. He has written books on cricket and Christian belief.

== See also ==
- List of South Africa cricketers who have taken five-wicket hauls on Test debut

== Books ==
- Bouncers and Boundaries (with Graeme Pollock) (1968)
- The Thirty Tests (1978)
- Clean Bowled (1985)
- God's Fast Bowler (2001)
- The Winning Factor (2004)
- Into the Light (2012)
