= List of World XI Twenty20 International cricketers =

The ICC World XI is a team chosen by the International Cricket Council (ICC), first selected (for a Twenty20 International (T20I)) for the 2017 Independence Cup tour of Pakistan in September 2017. The ICC World XI played three T20I matches against Pakistan in this series, which was seen by the ICC as a step towards the return of international cricket to Pakistan who have been forced to play most of their home matches in the United Arab Emirates since a terror attack on the Sri Lanka team bus during a Test match in March 2009. Six security men and two civilians were killed, as well as some Sri Lankan players being injured, which resulted in the match and series being abandoned. limited international cricket was played in the country up to 2019. Since the start of the 2020s, Pakistan has hosted several international tours. Pakistan won the Independence Cup by two matches to one.

A World XI played a T20I against the West Indies at Lord's on 31 May 2018. The match was held as a fundraiser to aid restoration efforts in parts of the Caribbean hit by Hurricanes Irma and Maria in September 2017. Restoration of the cricket grounds in Dominica and Anguilla was identified as a particular target.

A World XI was scheduled to play two T20I matches in April 2020 against an Asia XI in Dhaka, to celebrate the birth centenary of Sheikh Mujibur Rahman, the founder of Bangladesh. However, on 11 March 2020, the matches were deferred until further notice due to the COVID-19 pandemic.

This is a list of players that have played in at least one T20I match for the World XI, and is arranged in the order in which each player won his first T20I cap for the side. In cases in which more than one player won his first T20I cap for the World XI in the same match, these players are listed alphabetically by surname. All of these players have also represented their respective national teams, but only their records in games played for the ICC World XI are given.

== Key ==
General

- ‡ – Captain
- † – Wicket-keeper
- First – Year of debut
- Last – Year of latest game
- Mat – Number of matches played

Batting

- Runs – Runs scored in career
- HS – Highest score
- 50 – Half-centuries scored
- Avg – Runs scored per dismissal
- * – Batsman remained not out

Bowling

- Balls – Balls bowled in career
- Wkt – Wickets taken in career
- BBI – Best bowling in an innings
- Ave – Average runs per wicket

Fielding

- Ca – Catches taken
- St – Stumpings affected

== Players ==
Statistics are correct as of 31 May 2018

World XI T20I cricketers
General						Batting				Bowling				Fielding		Ref
No.	Name	Nationality	First	Last	Mat	Runs	HS	50	Avg	Balls	Wkt	BBI	Ave	Ca	St	Ref
1	Hashim Amla	South Africa	2017	2017	3	119	72*	1	59.50	–	–	–	–	1	–	
2	Ben Cutting	Australia	2017	2017	3	5	5	0	5.00	60	2	1/38	58.00	0	–	
3	Faf du Plessis	South Africa	2017	2017	3	62	29	0	20.66	–	–	–	–	2	–	
4	Grant Elliott	New Zealand	2017	2017	1	14	14	0	14.00	12	0	–	–	0	–	
5	Imran Tahir	South Africa	2017	2017	3	–	–	–	–	60	2	1/29	44.50	2	–	
6	David Miller	South Africa	2017	2017	3	41	32	0	20.50	–	–	–	–	3	–	
7	Morné Morkel	South Africa	2017	2017	3	1	1	0	1.00	72	1	1/32	94.00	0	–	
8	Tim Paine	Australia	2017	2017	2	35	25	0	17.50	–	–	–	–	1	–	
9	Thisara Perera	Sri Lanka	2017	2018	4	157	61	1	52.33	78	6	2/23	23.00	1	–	
10	Darren Sammy	West Indies	2017	2017	2	53	29*	0	–	36	0	–	–	1	–	
11	Tamim Iqbal	Bangladesh	2017	2018	4	57	23	0	14.25	–	–	–	–	0	–	
12	Samuel Badree	West Indies	2017	2017	2	0	0*	0	–	42	2	2/31	29.50	0	–	
13	Paul Collingwood	England	2017	2017	1	–	–	–	–	12	0	–	–	1	–	
14	George Bailey	Australia	2017	2017	1	3	3	0	3.00	–	0	–	–	0	–	
15	Sam Billings	England	2018	2018	1	4	4	0	4.00	–	–	–	–	0	–	
16	Dinesh Karthik	India	2018	2018	1	0	0	0	0.00	–	–	–	–	0	–	
17	Sandeep Lamichhane	Nepal	2018	2018	1	4	4*	0	–	6	0	–	–	0	–	
18	Mitchell McClenaghan	New Zealand	2018	2018	1	10	10	0	10.00	18	0	–	–	0	–	
19	Tymal Mills	England	2018	2018	1	–	–	–	–	18	0	–	–	0	–	
20	Rashid Khan	Afghanistan	2018	2018	1	9	9	0	9.00	24	2	2/48	24.00	0	–	
21	Luke Ronchi	New Zealand	2018	2018	1	0	0	0	0.00	–	–	–	–	0	1	
22	Shahid Afridi	Pakistan	2018	2018	1	11	11	0	11.00	24	1	1/34	34.00	0	–	
23	Shoaib Malik	Pakistan	2018	2018	1	12	12	0	11.00	18	1	1/31	31.00	0	–	

== See also ==
- Twenty20 International
- List of World XI Test cricketers
- List of World XI ODI cricketers
