= South African cricket team in New Zealand in 2014–15 =

International cricket tour

	New Zealand	South Africa
- Dates: 21 October – 27 October 2014
Captains	Brendon McCullum	AB de Villiers

One Day International series
- Results: South Africa won the 3-match series 2–0
Most runs	Luke Ronchi (178)	Hashim Amla (169)
Most wickets	Trent Boult (4)	Vernon Philander (4)

The South Africa cricket team toured New Zealand from 21 to 27 October 2014. The tour consisted of three One Day International matches, which South Africa won 2–0. The third ODI was abandoned halfway during the first innings due to rain. With the series win, South Africa moved to the top of the ODI ranking table for the first time in five years.

== Squads ==
ODIs
New Zealand	South Africa
Brendon McCullum (C); Corey Anderson; Trent Boult; Dean Brownlie; Martin Guptill; Matt Henry; Tom Latham; Mitchell McClenaghan; Nathan McCullum; Kyle Mills; Jimmy Neesham; Luke Ronchi (WK); Tim Southee; Daniel Vettori	AB de Villiers (C); Hashim Amla; Kyle Abbott; Quinton de Kock; JP Duminy; Faf du Plessis; Imran Tahir; Ryan McLaren; David Miller; Morne Morkel; Wayne Parnell; Aaron Phangiso; Vernon Philander; Rilee Rossouw; Dale Steyn

== ODI series ==
=== 1st ODI ===
21 October 2014
11:00
Scorecard

New Zealand; 230 (45.1 overs)	v	South Africa; 236/4 (48.1 overs)
Luke Ronchi 99 (83); Imran Tahir 2/37 (10 overs)		AB de Villiers 89* (85); Trent Boult 2/40 (10 overs)

South Africa won by 6 wickets
Bay Oval, Mount Maunganui
Umpires: Chris Gaffaney (NZ) and Rod Tucker (Aus)
Player of the match: AB de Villiers (SA)

- South Africa won the toss and elected to field.

=== 2nd ODI ===
24 October 2014
11:00
Scorecard

South Africa; 282/9 (50 overs)	v	New Zealand; 210 (46.3 overs)
Hashim Amla 119 (135); Corey Anderson 2/30 (4 overs)		Luke Ronchi 79 (83); Vernon Philander 2/27 (7.3 overs)

South Africa won by 72 runs
Bay Oval, Mount Maunganui
Umpires: Steve Davis (Aus) and Derek Walker (NZ)
Player of the match: Hashim Amla (SA)

- New Zealand won the toss and elected to field.
- AB de Villiers took his maiden ODI wicket when he dismissed Tom Latham.

=== 3rd ODI ===
27 October 2014
11:00
Scorecard

South Africa; 157/3 (30.4 overs)	v	New Zealand
Quinton de Kock 80* (94); Matt Henry 2/40 (8 overs)

No result
Seddon Park, Hamilton
Umpires: Chris Gaffaney (NZ) and Rod Tucker (Aus)

- New Zealand won the toss and chose to field.
- Rain caused the game to be abandoned during South Africa's innings.
