= International cricket in 1967 =

International cricket season

The 1967 International cricket season was from May 1967 to August 1967.

== Season overview ==
International tours
Start date	Home team	Away team	Results [Matches]			
Start date	Home team	Away team	Test	ODI	FC	LA
8 June 1967	England	India	3–0 [3]	—	—	—
17 July 1967	England	Pakistan	2–0 [3]	—	—	—
7 August 1967	M.C.C.	Netherlands	—	—	1–0 [1]	—
International tournaments
Start date	Tournament				Winners	
9 September 1967	(England) 1967 Rothmans World Cricket Cup				World XI	

== June ==
=== India in England ===
Test series
No.	Date	Home captain	Away captain	Venue	Result
Test 618	8–13 June	Brian Close	Mansoor Ali Khan Pataudi	Headingley Cricket Ground, Leeds	England by 6 wickets
Test 619	22–26 June	Brian Close	Mansoor Ali Khan Pataudi	Lord's, London	England by an innings and 124 runs
Test 620	13–15 July	Brian Close	Mansoor Ali Khan Pataudi	Edgbaston Cricket Ground, Birmingham	England by 132 runs

== July ==
=== Pakistan in England ===
Test series
No.	Date	Home captain	Away captain	Venue	Result
Test 621	27 Jul–1 August	Brian Close	Hanif Mohammad	Lord's, London	Match drawn
Test 622	10–15 August	Brian Close	Hanif Mohammad	Old Trafford Cricket Ground, Manchester	England by 10 wickets
Test 623	24–28 August	Brian Close	Hanif Mohammad	Kennington Oval, London	England by 8 wickets

== August ==
=== Netherlands vs M.C.C in England ===
First-class match
No.	Date	Home captain	Away captain	Venue	Result
FC Match	7 August	MP Murray	Rene Schoonheim	Lord's, London	MCC by 6 wickets

== September ==
=== 1967 Rothmans Cup ===
50-over Series
No.	Date	Team 1	Captain 1	Team 2	Captain 2	Venue	Result
Match 1	9 September	England	Mike Smith	World XI	Garfield Sobers	Lord's, London	Rest of World XI by 8 wickets
Match 2	11 September	England	Mike Smith	Pakistan	Hanif Mohammad	Lord's, London	England by 6 wickets
Match 3	12 September	Pakistan	Hanif Mohammad	World XI	Garfield Sobers	Lord's, London	Rest of World XI by 44 runs
