= Eoin Morgan =

Irish-England cricketer (born 1986)

Eoin Morgan CBE
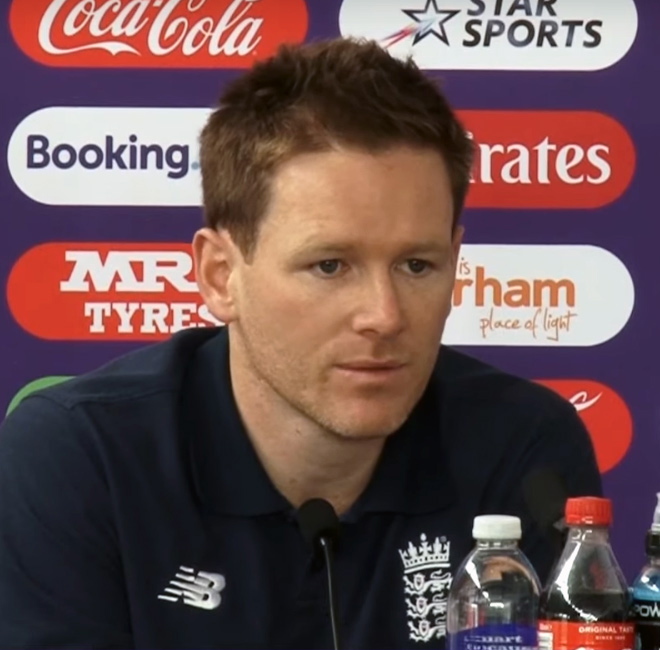
- Eoin Morgan in 2019

Personal information
- Full name: Eoin Joseph Gerard Morgan
- Born: 10 September 1986 (age 40); Dublin, Ireland
- Nickname: Captain Morgan, Moggie, Morgs
- Height: 1.75 m (5 ft 9 in)
- Batting: Left-handed
- Role: Middle-order batter

International information
- National sides: Ireland (2006–2009); England (2009–2022)
- Test debut (cap 649): 27 May 2010; England v Bangladesh
- Last Test: 3 February 2012; England v Pakistan
- ODI debut (cap 12/208): 5 August 2006; Ireland v Scotland
- Last ODI: 19 June 2022; England v Netherlands
- T20I debut (cap 45): 5 June 2009; England v Netherlands
- Last T20I: 23 January 2022; England v West Indies

Domestic team information
- Years: Team
- 2005–2023: Middlesex
- 2010: Royal Challengers Bangalore
- 2011–2013, 2020-2021: Kolkata Knight Riders
- 2013: Gazi Tank Cricketers
- 2013/14–2016/17: Sydney Thunder
- 2015–2016: Sunrisers Hyderabad
- 2017: Peshawar Zalmi
- 2017: Kings XI Punjab
- 2017: Barbados Tridents
- 2018: Karachi Kings
- 2018: Tshwane Spartans
- 2021–2023: London Spirit

Career statistics
Competition	Test	ODI	T20I	T20
Matches	16	248 (Note: 23 for Ireland; 225 for England)	115	374
Runs scored	700	7,701	2,458	7,780
Batting average	30.43	39.29	28.58	26.02
100s/50s	2/3	14/47	0/14	0/38
Top score	130	148	91	91
Catches/stumpings	11/–	87/–	46/–	160/–
Medal record
Men's Cricket
Representing England
ICC Cricket World Cup
Winner	2019 England and Wales
ICC T20 World Cup
Winner	2010 West Indies
Runner-up	2016 India
ICC Champions Trophy
Runner-up	2013 England and Wales
- Source: ESPNcricinfo, 29 November 2023

Eoin Joseph Gerard Morgan CBE (/ˈoʊ.ɪn/ OH-in; born 10 September 1986) is a cricket commentator and former cricketer who played for Ireland and England. He captained the England in limited overs cricket from 2015 until his international retirement in June 2022. He is regarded as one of England's greatest limited-overs captains. Under his captaincy, England won the 2019 ICC Cricket World Cup, their first title in the tournament, and reached the final of the 2016 ICC World Twenty20. Morgan was also a member of the England team that won the 2010 ICC World Twenty20.

A left-handed batsman, Morgan played county cricket for Middlesex and represented England in Test, One Day International (ODI), and Twenty20 International (T20I) cricket. He previously played ODI cricket for Ireland, his country of birth, and was the first player to score an ODI century for two nations.

After Alastair Cook was removed as ODI captain on 19 December 2014, Morgan was appointed England captain for the 2015 Cricket World Cup, having already served as stand-in captain in ODIs and T20Is. During the 2019 ICC Cricket World Cup, he set the record for the most sixes in an ODI innings, hitting 17 against Afghanistan. In March 2021, Morgan became the first male England cricketer to play in 100 T20Is, 57 of them as captain, in the third match against India. On 13 February 2023, he announced his retirement from all forms of the game.

As of 2026, Morgan is the most-capped player for England in ODI matches.

== Early life and education ==
Morgan was born on 10 September 1986 in Dublin and brought up in Rush, where his father Jody was from; his mother Olivia is English. He learned to play cricket at Rush Cricket Club, where his father was Third XI captain.

He was educated at the Catholic University School on Leeson Street, where he played in three Leinster Senior Schools Cup champion teams. In his early teens, Morgan played hurling twice a week. Often questioned as to its influence in the development of his skills as a batsman, Morgan downplays this, aside from possibly the reverse sweep, where the grip is the same as for hurling.

During this time, he also briefly attended Dulwich College in south London to further his cricketing education and it was here that his ambition to play for England began. He represented Ireland's youth teams and was capped at Under-13, Under-15 and Under-17 level, eventually he became Ireland's youngest senior international. He spent a number of summer spells with Middlesex's under-age setup.

He was selected in the Irish under-19 squad for the 2004 Under-19 Cricket World Cup, and was Ireland's top run-scorer in the competition.

Two years later, he captained Ireland in the 2006 Under-19 World Cup where he finished as the second-highest overall run-scorer. He has also played for Finchley CC. He is the leading runscorer in U19 Cricket World Cup history with an aggregate of 606 runs.

== Domestic career ==
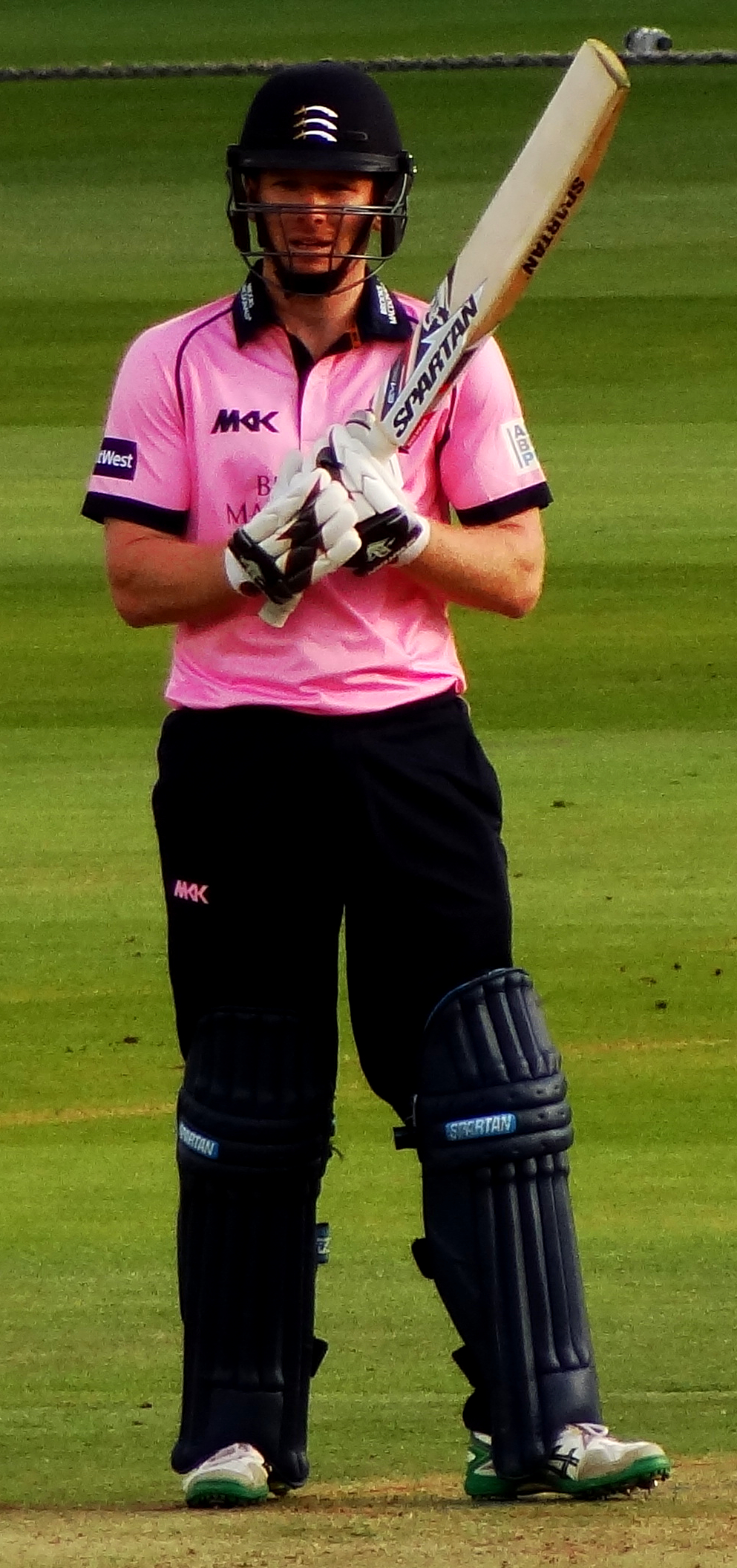
Morgan batting for Middlesex in 2015.

Morgan scored his maiden first-class century for Middlesex on 5 July 2008 at Uxbridge. This was compiled from 250 balls against the touring South Africans before their Test series against England; the innings included three sixes off spinner Paul Harris. Morgan was part of Middlesex's victorious Twenty20 Cup winning team in 2008. He underlined his growing maturity after leading Middlesex to victory in the County Championship against Kent.

After regular captain Shaun Udal was injured on the morning of the match, Morgan was named captain, at an age of just 22, having been chosen over senior players Owais Shah, Chris Silverwood, Murali Kartik and Tyron Henderson. It was Middlesex's first four-day victory of the season. Udal returned to captain the team for the next match against Essex.

In January 2020, Morgan was named as the captain for Middlesex's T20 team for the 2020 Vitality Blast campaign. "I'm delighted to be awarded the T20 Captaincy. The role is one that I have really enjoyed. We’ve got an exciting group of players here at Middlesex, with plenty of talent and a good blend of youth and experience, and I'm really looking forward to helping the club build on the improvements we made in this format last year", Morgan's statement read upon assuming the captain's role.

=== T20 franchise cricket ===
Morgan took part in the 2010 Indian Premier League (IPL). In the preceding player auction, he was bought by Royal Challengers Bangalore for a sum of $220,000. However, he was in and out of the team and was not given much opportunity. Morgan was purchased by the Kolkata Knight Riders for $350,000 at the 2011 IPL auctions for the next 3 years. He decided not to enter IPL 2014 due to England playing a home ODI series against Sri Lanka while the IPL took place.

In 2015, Morgan played in the Indian Premier League and was bought by Sunrisers Hyderabad for $150,000. During the tournament, he missed England's ODI game against Ireland. He also played 7 games for the Sunrisers in IPL 2016.

In the 2017 IPL auction, Morgan was bought by Kings XI Punjab for Rs. 2 Crore. He played until 30 April before returning to England for a training camp. He played in the Pakistan Super League (PSL) for the Peshawar Zalmi in the 2017 season having been bought for US$140,000 in the Platinum Category.

In October 2018, Morgan was named in Tshwane Spartans' squad for the first edition of the Mzansi Super League T20 tournament. In July 2019, he was selected to play for the Dublin Chiefs in the inaugural edition of the Euro T20 Slam cricket tournament. However, the following month the tournament was cancelled.

In the 2020 IPL auction, he was sold to Kolkata Knight Riders (KKR) for 5.25 crores, and during the season was appointed KKR's captain. In the 2021 season, Morgan led KKR to its third IPL final where they lost to Chennai Super Kings. He was not retained by KKR for the 2022 season and went unsold at the subsequent player auction.

From 2021 onwards, he played for the London Spirit in The Hundred.

== International career ==
=== Ireland ===
Morgan made his One Day International debut for Ireland on 5 August 2006 at the European Championships against Scotland. He fell one run short of a century, scoring 99 before he was run out. It was the first time in ODI history that a player had been dismissed for 99 on debut. Only two other batters passed 20 as Ireland beat Scotland by 85 runs. His maiden ODI hundred came not long after, on 4 February 2007 against Canada in Nairobi. At the time, he was the youngest ever non-subcontinental player to make a century in ODI cricket, a record subsequently beaten by two other players.

Morgan was the first cricketer to score a first-class double century for Ireland, with an unbeaten 209 against the United Arab Emirates in February 2007 at Abu Dhabi. In February 2007, Morgan was named in Ireland's 15-man squad for the 2007 Cricket World Cup. Although Ireland performed well in the tournament, Morgan struggled personally, scoring just 91 runs from nine innings. In all, Morgan played in 23 ODIs for Ireland, scoring 744 runs at an average of 35.42.

=== England ===
==== On the fringes ====
In 2010, Morgan told the Sunday Times that "From the age of 13, I wanted to play cricket for England. I’ve never felt any shame in saying this is what I wanted to do. And the people at home involved in cricket, they were like, 'Fair play, it's going to be unbelievable if you make it'. So I’ve never had any shame about this and my father's never had any shame about it." He has subsequently stated that his mother is English, and that he has held a British passport since birth. At the time, England was one of the ten full members of the International Cricket Council, while Ireland was an associate member; only full member nations can play a full schedule of international cricket, including Test matches. Ireland were subsequently admitted as full members in 2017.

In May 2007, Morgan was named as twelfth man for the Lord's Test versus West Indies, and came on for Matthew Hoggard on the third day. On 16 August 2008, Morgan represented the England Lions in a list A match against the touring South Africans. He scored 47* in an unbeaten partnership of 113 with Samit Patel in the course of England Lions securing a six wicket victory. Morgan was part of the England Performance Programme squad in India in the winter of 2008, although no matches were played as the tour was cancelled after the 2008 Mumbai attacks. Morgan was also part of the England Lions for the winter tour of New Zealand.

After touring with the England Lions over the winter, it was announced in April 2009 that Morgan was in England's 30-man provisional squad for the 2009 ICC World Twenty20. This meant that he could not play for Ireland, who were also participating in the tournament. While disappointed to be denied Morgan's batting, Irish cricket team manager Roy Torrens said "[Morgan's] made no secret of that fact [wanting to play Test cricket]. So you know, it's not totally unexpected to us. We realise this is always going to be a problem with our better players playing in England".

==== 2009 West Indies, Australia and South Africa ====
Morgan's progression towards representing the senior England team continued when in May 2009 he was named in England's 14-man squad to face West Indies in a three-match ODI series and the 15-man squad for the World Twenty20. Morgan made his England debut in the second One Day International (after the first was abandoned due to rain), and also played in the third of the series. Morgan did not have much chance to impress with the bat, due to not coming in until late in the innings, making scores of 2 and 6 not out, but was praised for his athletic fielding.

Morgan played in the opening match of the World Twenty20 against the Netherlands, but after England's defeat, he played no further part in the tournament.

At the end of the English Summer, Morgan was involved in the ODI series against Australia. Although they had just lost the Ashes to England in the Test series, Australia won the first five games with Morgan one of few batters to emerge with any credit, including a first one-day half-century for England in the fifth match, winning praise with his innovative style.

In the first game of the 2009 ICC Champions Trophy, Morgan led England to an unexpected victory over much fancied Sri Lanka. He hit an unbeaten 62, and was well supported by Middlesex colleague Owais Shah. Morgan kept wicket for the first time in his professional career in the next match against South Africa, after regular wicket-keeper Matt Prior was struck down by illness. Morgan scored 67 runs from just 34 balls in England's innings.

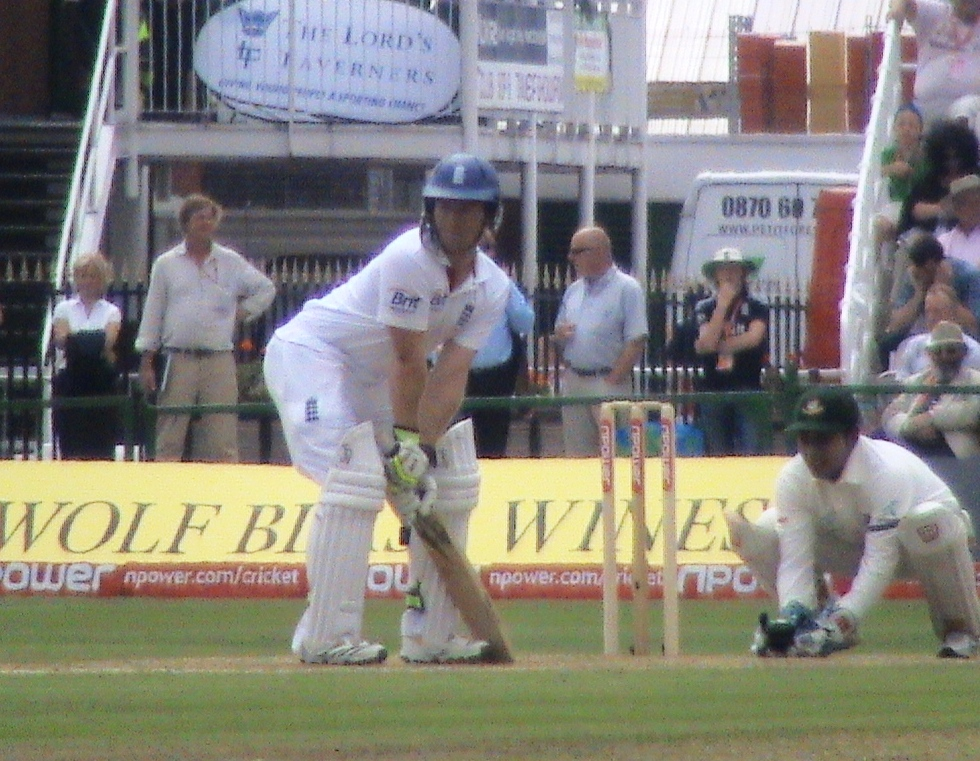
Morgan batting against Bangladesh in 2010

In the ODI series against South Africa, Morgan was selected in the team for the second match of the series. He made 27 to help England secure a seven wicket victory. In the following match he was dismissed for a duck as South Africa secured a convincing victory, winning by 112 runs.

==== 2010 Bangladesh, World T20, Australia and Pakistan ====
After making 33 in the first match of the ODI series in Bangladesh, he hit an unbeaten 110 to help England win the second ODI by two wickets, with innings earning him the man of the match award. He made 36 in the final match of the series, meaning he had scored 169 runs in the three matches he had played. Morgan was one of England's stand out batters in the series and his performances earned him praise from the media.

He was an important part of England's Twenty20 team that won the 2010 ICC World Twenty20 tournament in the West Indies. He top-scored in England's group games against the West Indies and his native Ireland, as well as the Super Eights game against New Zealand. Due to effective team bowling and half-centuries from Kevin Pietersen and Craig Kieswetter, he was hardly needed in the semi-final against Sri Lanka and final against Australia, finishing not-out in both matches.

England then hosted Australia in a five-match ODI series. In the first game, Morgan scored an unbeaten 103 off 85 balls at the Rose Bowl and followed it up with a half-century in the second, with England winning both matches. England won the series with two games to spare, although they lost both dead rubbers, and Morgan was named Player of the Series.

On the back of his one-day success, he was then included in England's Test squad for the home series against Bangladesh. With Paul Collingwood rested, he made his debut in the first Test at Lord's on 27 May 2010. He scored 44 runs in the first innings but was not required in the second innings as England won by eight wickets after making Bangladesh follow-on. In the second Test, he scored 37 runs as England won by an innings and 80 runs.

An injury to Ian Bell saw Morgan retained for the Test series against Pakistan. In the first Test at Trent Bridge, he scored a century as England won by 354 runs. In the third ODI he made an impressive 61, although England lost the match by 23 runs. In the final match of the series he scored 107 not out to help England win by 121 runs.

==== 2011 Australia and World Cup ====
Morgan did not perform well during the ODI series with Australia. His top score of the series came in the third match between the two teams, where he made 30.

Morgan was not initially named in England's squad for the 2011 World Cup as he was suffering from a fractured finger, but was later called up following an injury to Kevin Pietersen. On 11 March 2011 he made his World Cup debut for England, scoring 63 runs in the defeat to Bangladesh, making him only the fourth player to have represented two different nations at the Cricket World Cup. England qualified for the quarter-finals where they lost to Sri Lanka by ten wickets, although Morgan made 50 off 66 balls.

==== 2011 India and Sri Lanka ====
Eoin Morgan batting in July 2011 in the 5th ODI against Sri Lanka. He scored 57 runs from 60 balls.

The retirement of Paul Collingwood from Test cricket opened up a place in England's batting order. Morgan and Ravi Bopara were the leading contenders for the position; while Bopara stayed in England to play county cricket, Morgan chose to play in the IPL for six weeks. In nine innings for Kolkata Knight Riders Morgan scored 137 runs with a highest score of 66. His first first-class innings of the English season was in a match for the England Lions against the touring Sri Lankans alongside batters competing to the vacant place in England's batting line up. He scored 193 and according to the national selector it was enough to secure his selection for the squad to face Sri Lanka in first Test against Sri Lanka in May.

England won the three-match series 1–0, with Morgan scoring 168 runs from four innings including two half-centuries. Stuart Broad replaced Collingwood as T20I captain in June, and Morgan was named as vice-captain in the format. England also won the five-match ODI series 3–2, with Morgan scoring 158 runs including another two half-centuries. His performance in the series saw Morgan move up one place in the ICC's ODI rankings to 23rd.

Morgan retained his place when India toured England later that summer for four Tests. In the first three innings Morgan managed just 19 runs, including two ducks however in the second innings of the second Test Morgan partnered Matt Prior as the two scored rapid half-centuries against a struggling Indian bowling attack. England won the match by 319 runs. An injury to Jonathan Trott meant that Ravi Bopara, with whom Morgan had been competing for a place earlier that summer, was called into the team. Morgan scored his second Test century as England amassed 710/7 declared. England won the Test series 4–0 and in the process replaced India as the number 1 ranked Test team in the world. Morgan's 194 runs in the series came at an average of 32.33.

After the series win against India, Cook was rested for England's one-off ODI against Ireland and Morgan handed the captaincy for the fixture, becoming only the third Irish man to lead England. (Note: The other two were Timothy O'Brien and Frederick Fane.) An innings of 59 from Morgan shepherded his inexperienced team, which featured three debutantes, to victory and secured him the Man-of-the-Match award. During a T20I against India in late August, Morgan's shoulder became acutely painful. He underwent surgery and missed the home and away ODI series against India. Mitigating this disappointment, in September Morgan was awarded a central contract for the first time by the England and Wales Cricket Board (ECB).

==== 2012 Pakistan and West Indies ====
Morgan recovered from his shoulder injury to participate in England's series against Pakistan in the UAE from January to February 2012. England lost the Test series 3–0 with their batters struggling to cope against Pakistan's spin bowlers. In the second Test he came under increased pressure, scoring just 3 runs in the entire match after being dismissed for a duck in the second innings. His top score of the series came in his final innings of the tour, where he made 31. Morgan, Pietersen, and Bell played in all three matches and each scored fewer than 90 runs in the series. Coach Andy Flower commented that Morgan had struggled during the tour of the UAE, and the batter was dropped from England's Test squad to tour Sri Lanka in March.

Although he was omitted from the Test team, Morgan remained a key figure in the limited overs formats. He made 21 in the first ODI against the West Indies, although he did not bat in the second match.

==== 2012 Australia and South Africa ====
He made 89 not out in the first ODI against Australia to help England win the match by 15 runs. He followed this up by making an unbeaten 43 in the second ODI.

He was seen as one of contender to replace Kevin Pietersen, who was not selected for the Test team following reports of him texting South Africans players, but selectors chose James Taylor. He still played a big part in the limited overs series. In the second match he made an impressive 73 as England levelled the series. He made 36 not out in the next match as England took a lead in the series. He was not effective with the bat in the T20 series, scoring just 15 runs in the series, although this was partly due to him having limited time at the crease.

In the World T20, Morgan was seen as a vital player who would have to perform if England were to do well. He made 27 in their opening win against Afghanistan but was out for 2 as England were thrashed by India, but still qualified in second place. He hit 71 runs of just 36 against the West Indies in the first match of the Super Eight stage. Despite his efforts, England still lost by 15 runs. He hit 30 against New Zealand as England won to keep their hopes of qualification alive. However, England lost to Sri Lanka by seven wickets meaning that their hopes of progressing were over as they were knocked out of the competition.

==== 2013 India and New Zealand ====
In 2013, Morgan captained the T20I team against India in the absence of Stuart Broad, who was injured. He made an unbeaten 49 in the second as England won by 5 wickets to level the series. Morgan was praised for captaincy and many pundits suggested he would lead England on a permanent basis in the future.

He was selected for the One Day series against India at the beginning of 2013. He made 41 from 38 balls in the first match, as England won by 9 runs. He suffered poor form as England lost the next three games, his scores including 10 and a duck. However, he returned to form for the final match of the series where he hit an unbeaten 40 as he guided England to an impressive 7 wicket win. Although England lost the series 3–2, it was seen as an improvement given their recent poor performances in ODIs in India.

In the first T20I match against New Zealand, he helped England set 214 after he smashed 46 off just 26 balls as England won the match by 40 runs. He helped England win the decider in the ODI series, hitting 39 off 24 balls to help set up a 5 wicket win.

==== 2013 Champions Trophy and Australia ====
Morgan had an unproductive start to the 2013 ICC Champions Trophy, making a score of 8 against Australia, then 13 against Sri Lanka. With England needing to beat New Zealand to qualify from their group, Morgan made 15 to help England secure a victory. In the semi-final against South Africa, he made an unbeaten 15 to help guide England to victory and reach the final against India. He made 33 in the final, which turned out to be a low-scoring affair, but could not get England over the line as they finished the tournament as runners up.

He was named as the captain for ODI series against Ireland and Australia. He won the one-off match against Ireland where he scored his career best, an unbeaten 124, along with Ravi Bopara who also scored a maiden century after Ireland scored 269 and English team of was reduced to 48 for 4. He was consistent against the series against Australia where he led by example as captain even though his team lost 2–1 in series. He scored 54, 5 not out, 53 and 30 in ODIs and in T20Is he scored a duck and 20.

He joined up with the England squad in Australia after they had lost the Ashes 5–0. In the first ODI, he made 50 off 47 balls, but England went on to lose by 5 wickets. He made a century in the next match, but England were unable to close the game and lost by a single wicket. Morgan made another 50 in the third match, but they lost the game to go 3–0 down in the series. He hit 33 in the next match as England won their first game of the tour, but lost again in the final game where Morgan made 39. He did not take his impressive ODI form into the T20I series, where he scored just 10 runs in the first two matches. However, he top scored with 34 in the final match, as England were bowled out for 111 to end a miserable tour.

==== 2014 West Indies and T20 World Cup ====
In the warm up to the T20 World Cup, England embarked on a limited-overs tour of the West Indies. Morgan failed to make a big impact on the T20 series, making just 40 runs in the three match series, which England lost 2–1.

In the T20 World Cup, England lost their first game to New Zealand, with Morgan making just 12. However, they secured an unlikely victory in the next game against Sri Lanka with Morgan hitting 57 and batting well alongside Alex Hales to help England chase down a large Sri Lankan score and keep their hopes of winning the tournament alive. The pair set a new record for the highest 3rd wicket partnership in T20 World Cup history (152). However, they lost their next game to South Africa, with Morgan scoring just six to end their hopes of qualifying. In the final game of the tournament they suffered a humiliating defeat to the Netherlands, with Morgan scoring just six.

==== 2014 Sri Lanka and India ====
In the ODI series against Sri Lanka, Morgan top scored with 40 in the second game as England were bowled out for 99. England lost series 3–2.

After the first game against India was rained off, Morgan made 28 in the second match as England lost to go 1–0 down in the series. England lost the next two matches and the manner of the defeats led to questions over the personnel in the team, and pressure on captain Alastair Cook. Despite this, England won the final match of the series, although Morgan again failed to make a big score, being dismissed for 14. In the only T20 match between the two teams, Morgan hit 71 from just 31 balls in an innings that included seven sixes. England won the match by three runs and Morgan was named man of the match.

In the return series in Sri Lanka, Morgan endured a poor time. He scored just 19 runs in the first three games as England went 2–1 down in the series. In the fourth game, Alastair Cook was suspended due to a slow over rate in the previous game, and so Morgan took over as captain. He made 62, his only fifty of the tour, although England still went on to lose the game.

On 19 December 2014, 2 months before the 2015 ICC Cricket World Cup, it was announced that Cook had been removed as one-day captain due to poor form, and replaced by Eoin Morgan.

==== 2015 Tri-Series and 2015 ICC Cricket World Cup ====
Following his appointment as captain, Morgan's first series as skipper was a tournament contested by India, Australia and England. Morgan promised a more aggressive approach as captain and said England would be a more dynamic team. However, they suffered a loss in his first match leading the team against Australia. Morgan himself made an impressive 121 but it was not enough as the rest of England's batters struggled. Morgan was not needed to bat in the next match as England secured a comfortable win over India, Morgan's first as permanent captain. He again suffered defeat against Australia in the next game, being dismissed for a duck. England beat India again in the next game to qualify for the final, but Morgan was again unimpressive, making just two. England lost the final to Australia, with Morgan being dismissed for a duck again.

Morgan's poor form continued into the World Cup, where he only scored 90 runs in five innings. His tournament started badly as he was dismissed for a duck in England's opening game against Australia. He made 17 in the next match against New Zealand as England slumped to a humiliating eight wicket defeat. He made 46 against Scotland as England won their first match of the tournament, and made 27 in England's nine wicket defeat against Sri Lanka. He was out for yet another duck in England's must win game against Bangladesh, meaning they exited the tournament. They won their final match against Afghanistan, with Morgan not be required to bat. This meant that England managed to win only 2 out of 6 games in the tournament under Morgan's captaincy, both victories came against much lower ranked teams Afghanistan and Scotland.

==== 2015 New Zealand ====
Morgan continued in his role as ODI captain in the five-game series at home against New Zealand. The series began with a dominant performance by England, winning by 210 runs, Morgan contributing 50. The following match was a much more close-run affair, with New Zealand clinching the match by 13 runs (D/L method). Morgan performed strongly with the bat and scoring 88 off only 47 balls. New Zealand were victorious again in the third match, winning by 3 wickets with an over remaining. Morgan scored 71 in England's innings. In the fourth ODI, Morgan scored 113 from 82 balls, which helped England win the match by 7 wickets, a performance which earned him the Man of the Match award as England went on to win the series 3–2 as well as the one-off T20 match between the teams.

==== 2015 Australia ====
In the T20 against Australia, Morgan put in a strong performance, scoring 74 to send England on their way to a narrow victory. In the first ODI between the two teams, Morgan scored 38 but England went on to lose the match. England were also defeated in the second match, although Morgan impressed, scoring 85. Morgan scored another half century in the next match, making 62, as England won their first game of the series. England levelled the series in the next match, with Morgan hitting 92 to send England on their way to victory. The final match of the series between the two teams ended with Australia claiming an eight wicket victory, with Morgan being forced to retire hurt.

==== 2015-16 Pakistan and South Africa ====
Morgan made 76 in a losing cause in the first game of the ODI series against Pakistan. However, England went on to win the next three games to win the series 3–1. Morgan did not make a significant contribution with the bat in any of the victories, making scores of 29, 35 and 14. Despite this, he was praised for his captaincy and the amount of improvement that had been seen in the England team since the disappointing World Cup campaign. Morgan made a score of 45 in the first T20I against Pakistan. After making 15 in the next match, Morgan rested himself for the final match of the series, with Jos Buttler replacing him as captain. England won the series 3–0.

Morgan had a poor series against South Africa. He made scores of 23 and 29 in the first two games of the tournament, as England won both to take a 2–0 series lead. However, after these matches his own performances and that of the teams declined and Morgan failed to make double figures in the final three games of the series, being dismissed for scores of 8, 2 and 2 as South Africa won the final three games to take the series 3–2. Morgan played in both T20Is against South Africa, making scores of 10 and 38, although England lost both games to make it five defeats in a row.

==== 2016 World T20 ====
Morgan made 27 in the opening match of the T20 World Cup against West Indies, as England lost their opening group game. In the next match against South Africa, England completed a historic chase of 230, although Morgan himself only made 12. He followed this up with a duck against Afghanistan, although England recovered to win the game. After making 22 against Sri Lanka as England won to qualify for the semi-finals, Morgan was out for a first ball duck against New Zealand, although England won the match comfortably, winning by seven wickets. England lost the final against the West Indies, with Morgan making just five.

==== 2016 Sri Lanka and Pakistan ====
Morgan made 43 in the first ODI to help England tie the match after matching Sri Lanka's total of 286. He did not bat in the second match as England won the match by ten wickets. In the third match, he again did not bat as the match was abandoned due to rain early in England's reply to Sri Lanka's 248/9. He made 22 in the fourth match to help England win by six wickets, and he made 20 in the final match of the series as England scored 324 to win by 122 runs. In the only T20I between the teams, he made an unbeaten 47 and hit the winning runs as England won by eight wickets.

Morgan made an unbeaten 33 in the first ODI against Pakistan, as England won by 44 runs on the D/L Method. He scored 68 in the second match as England chased down Pakistan's total of 251 to win by four wickets. He scored an unbeaten 57 in the third ODI as England set a world record total of 444/3 and won the match by 169 runs. He scored 11 in the fourth match as England won again to go 4–0 up. However, in the final match Morgan only made ten as England lost by four wickets, although they won the series 4–1. In the only T20I between the two teams, Morgan made 14 as England scored 135/7 and went on to lose the match by nine wickets.

==== 2017 India ====
Morgan made 28 in the first ODI against India, which England lost by three wickets. He made 102 in the second match as England fell short of India's target to lose by 15 runs. He made 43 in the next match as England won by five runs, although they lost the series 2–1. He made 51 in the first T20I as England won the match by seven wickets. He made 17 in the next match although England lost the match by five runs as India levelled the series. In the third T20I he made 40, but England collapsed and lost the match by 75 runs.

==== 2017 West Indies ====
Morgan made 107 in the first ODI against the West Indies to help England to 296-6 and they won the game by 45 runs. With this century, which is the fifth as a captain, Morgan became the highest century maker for England as a captain, bettered previous record of 4 ODI centuries each by Alastair Cook and Andrew Strauss. In the second match he made seven as England secured a four wicket victory. In the final match of the series he made 11 as England made 328 and won by 186 runs to win the series 3–0.

==== 2018 ====
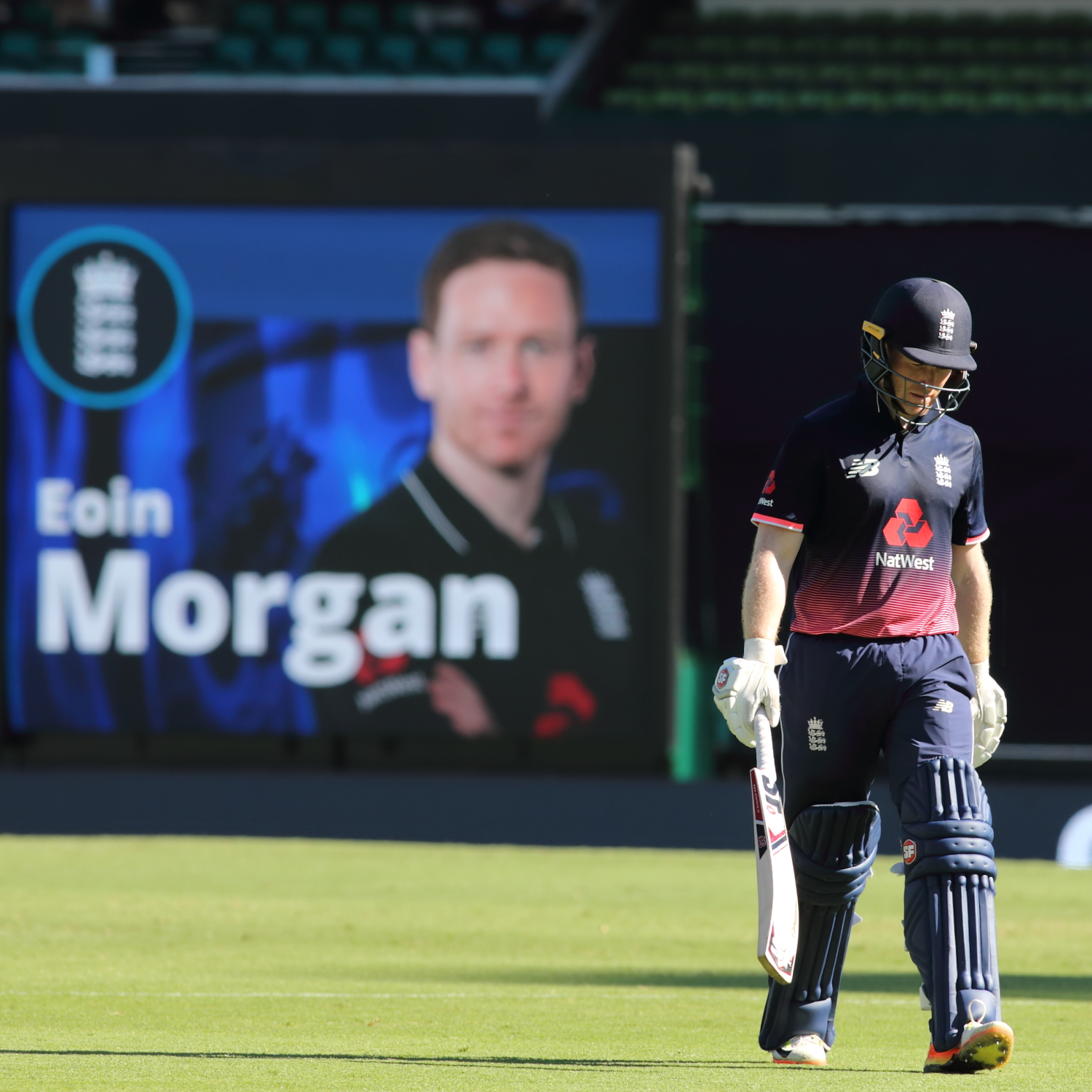
Morgan in January 2018

In March 2018, the ICC named Morgan as the captain of a World XI team to play a one-off T20I fixture against the West Indies at Lord's in May 2018. He had to withdraw from the team because of a broken finger. On 10 June, he captained England when they lost to Scotland by six runs, at The Grange Club in Edinburgh.

On 19 June 2018, during the third match of the home ODI series against Australia, Morgan surpassed the record of Ian Bell as the all-time leading run scorer for England in One Day International matches. In the same match England posted the highest ever ODI total of 481/6, with Morgan breaking another record: that held by Jos Buttler for the fastest ever fifty by an Englishman in ODIs. (21 balls)

==== 2019 Cricket World Cup ====
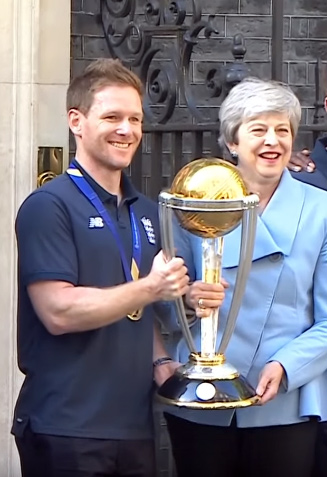
Eoin Morgan holding 2019 World cup trophy with prime minister Theresa May

In April 2019, he was named as the captain of England's squad for the 2019 Cricket World Cup. In the opening match of the World Cup, against South Africa, Morgan played in his 200th ODI match for England, and scored his 7,000th run in ODIs. On 14 June 2019, in the match against the West Indies, Morgan played in his 300th international match for England.

On 18 June 2019, in the match against Afghanistan at Old Trafford, Morgan scored 148 from 71 balls. His innings included 17 sixes, the most sixes by an individual in an ODI innings; his team scored 25 sixes in total, the most sixes by a team in an ODI innings. Morgan's century came from 57 balls, the fastest by an England batter in a Cricket World Cup match. On 21 June 2019, in the match against Sri Lanka, Morgan scored his 9,000th international run for England.

On 14 July 2019, led by Morgan, England won the World Cup for the first time, beating New Zealand in the final on the boundary count tiebreaker after the match and super over were tied.

==== 2020–2022 ====
Morgan captained the England team at the 2021 ICC Men's T20 World Cup, where they reached the semi-final.

By June 2022 Morgan had scored only one half-century in his previous 65 innings in all forms of cricket, and faced calls to resign the England captaincy. On 28 June 2022, he announced his retirement from international cricket.

Following his retirement, Morgan now works as a commentator.

== Captaincy ==
Morgan has been credited with improving England's white-ball game and changing their thought process, a decision he took with the management after their ICC CWC 2015 campaign, turning the England team into a strong white-ball unit. Many experts and former players have praised Morgan for turning England into a strong and formidable white ball team in both ODI and T20 cricket and changing the team culture. Nasser Hussain said of Morgan after his retirement, "Eoin Morgan is England's greatest white-ball captain and revolutionary batter. He has had a huge impact on English cricket. It goes without saying that he is England's greatest ever white-ball captain, a World Cup-winning captain."

== International statistics ==
Morgan has appeared in 16 Tests (all for England), 248 One Day Internationals (23 for Ireland, 225 for England) and 115 Twenty20 Internationals (all for England). He has scored 700 runs in Tests, 7,701 in ODIs and 2,458 in T20Is.

Batting
Format	Country	Matches	Runs	100s	Average
Test	England	16	700	2	30.43
ODI	Ireland	23	744	1	35.42
ODI	England	225	6,957	13	39.75
ODI	Total	248	7,701	14	39.29
T20I	England	102	2311	0	28.73

== Honours ==
- Morgan was appointed Commander of the Order of the British Empire (CBE) in the 2020 New Year Honours for services to cricket.
- He was made an Honorary Life Member of the Marylebone Cricket Club in 2023.

== See also ==
- List of cricketers who have played for more than one international team

== Notes ==
Sporting positions
Preceded by Alastair Cook	Acting England ODI cricket captain 2011–2014 deputising for Alastair Cook	Succeeded by Alastair Cook
Preceded by Alastair Cook	England ODI cricket captain 2015–2022	Succeeded by Jos Buttler
Preceded by Graeme Swann	Acting England Twenty20 captain 2012–2014 deputising for Stuart Broad	Succeeded by Stuart Broad
Preceded by Stuart Broad	England Twenty20 captain 2015–2022	Succeeded by Jos Buttler
Preceded by Neil Dexter	Middlesex; List A captain 2014–2015	Succeeded by James Franklin
Preceded by Neil Dexter	Middlesex Twenty20 captain 2014–2015	Succeeded by Dawid Malan
Preceded by Dawid Malan	Middlesex Twenty20 captain 2020-2021	Succeeded by Stephen Eskinazi
