= International cricket in 1970 =

International cricket season

The 1970 International cricket season was from May 1970 to September 1970. However, there were no any international match held during this season. The season consisted with 1970 English cricket season where they held 1970 County Championship from 25 July to 25 August, 1970 Gillette Cup and 1970 John Player League. However, Rest of the World XI toured England for an unofficial Test series. At the time, they were played as Test matches, but that status was later revoked by the International Cricket Conference (ICC) and they are now termed unofficial Tests, though still officially first-class matches.

== Season overview ==
International tours
Start date	Home team	Away team	Results [Matches]			
Start date	Home team	Away team	Test	ODI	FC	LA
3 June 1971	England	World XI	—	—	1–4 [6]	—

== June ==
=== World XI in England ===
First-class series
No.	Date	Home captain	Away captain	Venue	Result
Match 01	17–22 June	Ray Illingworth	Garfield Sobers	Lord's, London	Rest of the World XI by an innings and 80 runs
Match 02	2–7 July	Ray Illingworth	Garfield Sobers	Trent Bridge, Nottingham	England by 8 wickets
Match 03	16–21 July	Ray Illingworth	Garfield Sobers	Edgbaston Cricket Ground, Birmingham	Rest of the World XI by 5 wickets
Match 04	30 Jul–4 August	Ray Illingworth	Garfield Sobers	Headingley Cricket Ground, Leeds	Rest of the World XI by 2 wickets
Match 05	13–18 August	Ray Illingworth	Garfield Sobers	Kennington Oval, London	Rest of the World XI by 4 wickets
Match 06	5–8 September	Roger Prideaux	Rohan Kanhai	North Marine Road Ground, Scarborough	Match drawn
