= Mujib 100 T20 Cup Bangladesh 2020 =

Cricket tournament

	Asia XI	World XI
- Dates: 21 – 22 March 2020

Twenty20 International series

The Mujib 100 T20 Cup Bangladesh 2020 was a two-match Twenty20 International T20I series, that was to be hosted by the Bangladesh Cricket Board (BCB). The two matches were scheduled to be played between an Asia XI and a World XI teams in March 2020. The matches would have celebrated the birth centenary of Sheikh Mujibur Rahman, the founder of Bangladesh. The International Cricket Council (ICC) granted full international status to the two fixtures. On 25 February 2020, the BCB named two tentative squads for the fixtures. However, on 11 March 2020, the matches were "deferred until further notice" due to the COVID-19 pandemic.

== Background ==
In November 2019, the BCB made a request to the Board of Control for Cricket in India (BCCI) to allow seven of its players to be part of the Asia XI team. Originally, India were scheduled to be playing their third One Day International (ODI) match against South Africa on the same day as the first fixture of this series. However, in January 2020, the BCB announced that the first T20I match would take place on 21 March 2020, therefore avoiding the clash with the ODI match. On 26 December 2019, the BCCI's Joint Secretary, Jayesh George stated that if Indian players are going to be a part of the Asia XI, no players from Pakistan would be allowed to play, due to the current India–Pakistan ongoing standoff. Five Indian cricketers out of seven, as requested by the BCB, would play for the Asia XI side, selected by BCCI President Sourav Ganguly. However, a BCB official denied the claim, saying that they do not have any such intention from an ethical ground. Subsequently, a day later, Pakistan Cricket Board (PCB) chairman Ehsan Mani confirmed that no Pakistan cricketers would be available for the tournament, as the dates clash with the 2020 Pakistan Super League schedule.

== Squads ==
T20Is
Asia XI	World XI
Litton Das; Shikhar Dhawan; Tamim Iqbal; Rashid Khan; Virat Kohli; Sandeep Lamichhane; Mahmudullah; Lasith Malinga; Rishabh Pant; Thisara Perera; KL Rahul; Mushfiqur Rahim; Mustafizur Rahman; Mohammed Shami; Mujeeb Ur Rahman; Kuldeep Yadav	Jonny Bairstow; Sheldon Cottrell; Faf du Plessis; Chris Gayle; Alex Hales; Mitchell McClenaghan; Lungi Ngidi; Kieron Pollard; Nicholas Pooran; Adil Rashid; Brendan Taylor; Andrew Tye

== T20I series ==
=== 1st T20I ===
21 March 2020
Scorecard

Asia XI	v	World XI

Match Cancel
Sher-e-Bangla National Cricket Stadium, Dhaka

=== 2nd T20I ===
22 March 2020
Scorecard

Asia XI	v	World XI

Match Cancel
Sher-e-Bangla National Cricket Stadium, Dhaka

== See also ==
- 2019–20 Bangladesh Premier League
