= Ben Cutting =

Australian cricketer

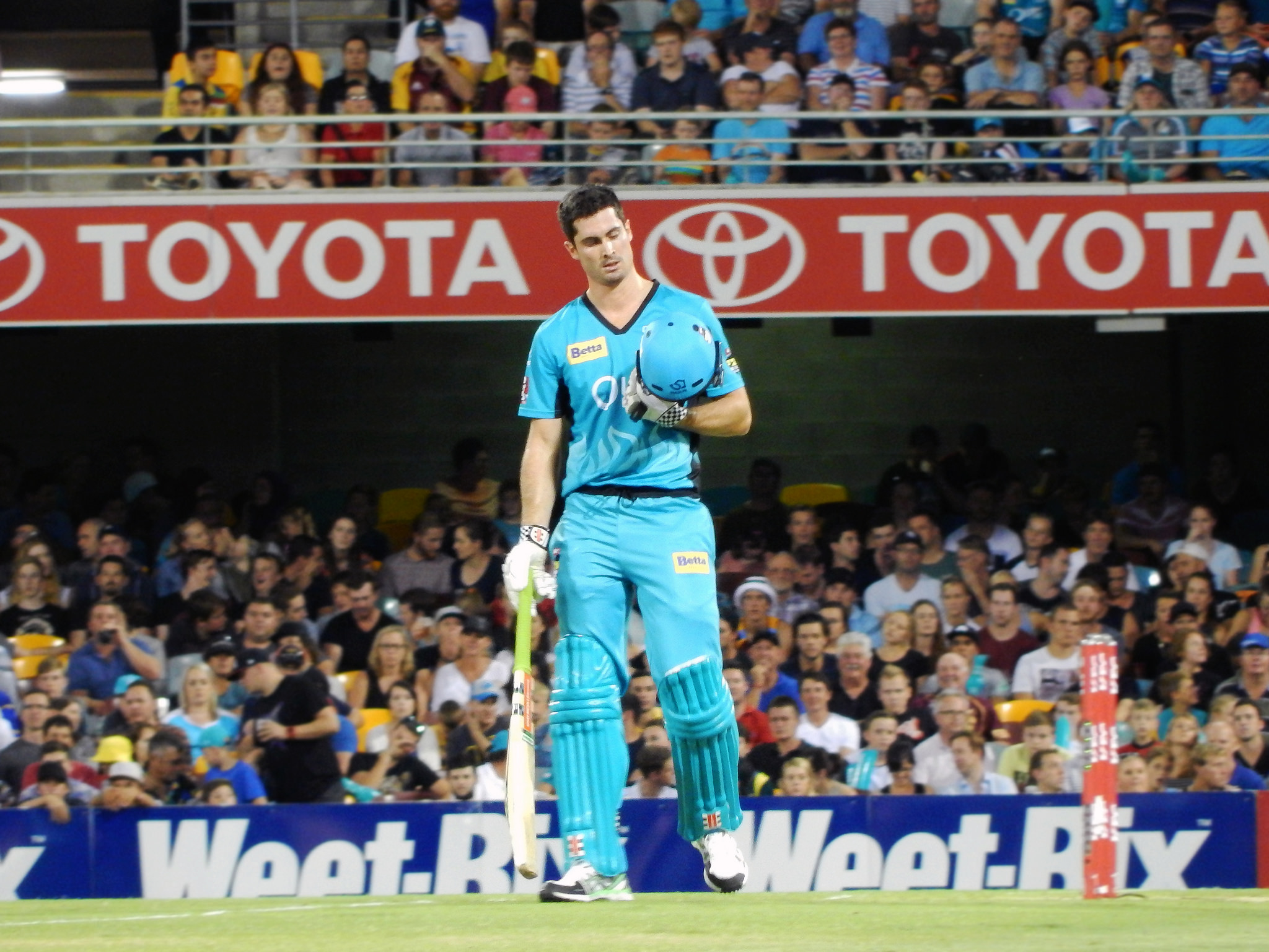

Personal information
- Full name: Benjamin Colin James Cutting
- Born: 30 January 1987 (age 39); Sunnybank, Queensland, Australia
- Batting: Right-handed
- Bowling: Right-arm fast-medium
- Role: All-rounder
- Relatives: Erin Holland (m. 2021) (wife)

International information
- National sides: Australia (2013–2017); World XI (2017)
- ODI debut: 13 January 2013; Australia v Sri Lanka
- Last ODI: 31 August 2014; Australia v Zimbabwe
- T20I debut: 26 January 2013; Australia v Sri Lanka
- Last T20I: 15 September 2017; World XI v Pakistan

Domestic team information
- Years: Team
- 2007/08–2019/20: Queensland
- 2012/13–2019/20: Brisbane Heat
- 2014: Rajasthan Royals
- 2016–2017: Sunrisers Hyderabad (squad no. 30)
- 2018–2019: Mumbai Indians (squad no. 31)
- 2018: St Kitts and Nevis Patriots
- 2018: Nangarhar Leopards
- 2020–2021: Quetta Gladiators (squad no. 31)
- 2020/21–present: Sydney Thunder (squad no. 5)
- 2022: Peshawar Zalmi (squad no. 31)
- 2023: Karachi Kings
- 2024: Sylhet Strikers (squad no. 32)
- 2024: Lumbini Lions

Career statistics
Competition	ODI	T20I	FC	LA
Matches	4	7	51	72
Runs scored	53	40	1,561	908
Batting average	26.50	10.00	23.65	19.73
100s/50s	0/0	0/0	1/7	0/2
Top score	27	29	109	98*
Balls bowled	216	126	8,597	3,640
Wickets	6	3	170	101
Bowling average	31.60	71.66	28.41	31.71
5 wickets in innings	0	0	6	0
10 wickets in match	0	0	0	0
Best bowling	3/45	1/18	6/37	4/27
Catches/stumpings	1/–	5/–	15/–	22/–
- Source: ESPNcricinfo, 4 October 2021

Benjamin Colin James Cutting (born 30 January 1987) is an Australian cricketer who plays as an all-rounder. Cutting represented Australia in one-day internationals and T20 matches, and at the 2006 U-19 Cricket World Cup in Sri Lanka. Cutting played first-class cricket for the Queensland between 2007 and 2018 before opting to play only white-ball cricket in the nascent worldwide Twenty20 franchise system. He most recently played for the New York Lions in the USA National Cricket League.

== Domestic career ==
Cutting made his first-class cricket debut for the Queensland Bulls against Tasmania in the first Pura Cup game of the 2007–08 season and despite his first ball going for five wides, ended up taking three wickets including that of Michael Di Venuto. In 2009–10 Cutting was one of the competition's leading wicket takers, with 25 wickets from his first six matches, raising hopes that he may be selected to represent Australia in Test cricket. He finished the season as the leading wicket taker – 46 wickets at 23.91. This included a career best 6/37 against Tasmania, and led to speculation of a future international debut.

On 3 April 2018, Cutting announced his retirement from first-class and List A cricket after a 12-year career in order to focus on his Twenty20 game and develop his new business. In September 2018, he was named in the squad of Nangarhar Leopards in the first edition of the Afghanistan Premier League tournament. He was the joint-leading wicket-taker for the Nangarhar Leopards in the tournament, with twelve dismissals in nine matches.

== International career ==
Cutting was included in the playing squad for the first test in the New Zealand cricket team in Australia in 2011–12 on 1 December 2011, but the selectors chose to give debuts to James Pattinson and Mitchell Starc. Cutting was the official 12th man but he left the state to play a domestic four day game instead where he injured himself bowling for Queensland. The injury cost him any chance he had of forcing his way into what became an unchanged team for the second test and ensured he was not considered for the following test series against India a month later. He was never included or considered for the Australian test team again.

On 13 January 2013, Cutting made his One Day International (ODI) debut. His four ODI matches returned 53 runs & 4 wickets, his final international appearance coming in a loss to Zimbabwe in August 2014.

On 26 January 2013 he made his T20 international debut against Sri Lanka, he did not bat in the Australian innings and failed to take a wicket in the Sri Lankan innings. He made three more appearances in sporadic fashion, scoring few runs and taking at most one wicket per game. He was dropped after playing in a loss to South Africa on 5 November 2014 where he scored 6 runs from 6 balls and took no wickets for 11 runs in his only over bowled.

In August 2017, he was named in a World XI team to play three Twenty20 International matches against Pakistan in the 2017 Independence Cup in Lahore. These matches were given official International status and so are included in his official statistics. In the first match he came in at the non-strikers end to watch the final ball of the game after taking one wicket in the Pakistan innings as Pakistan won the match. He took one wicket in the second game then watched from the stands without batting as the World team chased down 175 to win. The final match he bowled two overs for 26 runs and no wickets, and chasing 183 he was elevated up the batting order to bat third, scoring 5 runs in 4 balls then being dismissed by Hasan Ali as Pakistan won the series 2-1.

== T20 franchise cricket ==
He first made a mark in Indian Premier League 2016 by finishing off the finals match in favour of the Sunrisers Hyderabad.

In January 2018, he was bought by the Mumbai Indians in the 2018 IPL auction.

In June 2019, he was selected to play for the Edmonton Royals franchise team in the 2019 Global T20 Canada tournament. In July 2019, he was selected to play for the Amsterdam Knights in the inaugural edition of the Euro T20 Slam cricket tournament. However, the following month the tournament was cancelled. He was released by the Mumbai Indians ahead of the 2020 IPL auction.

In 2020 he was picked by the Quetta Gladiators in the draft for the Pakistan Super League 5. In February 2021, Cutting was bought by the Kolkata Knight Riders in the IPL auction ahead of the 2021 Indian Premier League. In July 2022, he was signed by the Dambulla Giants for the third edition of the Lanka Premier League.

== Personal life ==
Cutting is married to Australian model Erin Holland. He attended Brisbane Grammar School.
