= International cricket in 1966 =

International cricket season

The 1966 International cricket season was from May 1966 to August 1966.

== Season overview ==
International tours
Start date	Home team	Away team	Results [Matches]			
Start date	Home team	Away team	Test	ODI	FC	LA
2 June 1966	England	West Indies	1–3 [5]	—	—	—
21 June 1966	Scotland	Denmark	—	—	2–0 [3]	—
International tournaments
Start date	Tournament				Winners	
10 September 1966	(England) 1966 Rothmans World Cricket Cup				England	

== June ==
=== West Indies in England ===
Wisden Trophy Test series
No.	Date	Home captain	Away captain	Venue	Result
Test 605	2–4 June	Mike Smith	Garfield Sobers	Old Trafford Cricket Ground, Manchester	West Indies by an innings and 40 runs
Test 606	16 –21 June	Colin Cowdrey	Garfield Sobers	Lord's, London	Match drawn
Test 607	30 Jun–5 July	Colin Cowdrey	Garfield Sobers	Trent Bridge, Nottingham	West Indies by 139 runs
Test 608	4–8 August	Colin Cowdrey	Garfield Sobers	Headingley Cricket Ground, Leeds	West Indies by an innings and 55 runs
Test 609	18–22 August	Brian Close	Garfield Sobers	Kennington Oval, London	England by an innings and 34 runs

=== Denmark in Scotland ===
Two-day Match
No.	Date	Home captain	Away captain	Venue	Result
Match	21–22 June	James Ford	Carsten Morild	Raeburn Place, Edinburgh	Match drawn

== September ==
=== 1966 Rothmans Cup ===
50-over Series
No.	Date	Team 1	Captain 1	Team 2	Captain 2	Venue	Result
Match 1	10 September	England	Colin Cowdrey	World XI	Bob Simpson	Lord's, London	England by 82 runs
Match 2	12 September	West Indies	Garfield Sobers	World XI	Bob Simpson	Lord's, London	West Indies by 18 runs
Match 3	13 September	England	Colin Cowdrey	West Indies	Garfield Sobers	Lord's, London	England by 67 runs
