= Thisara Perera =

Sri Lankan cricketer

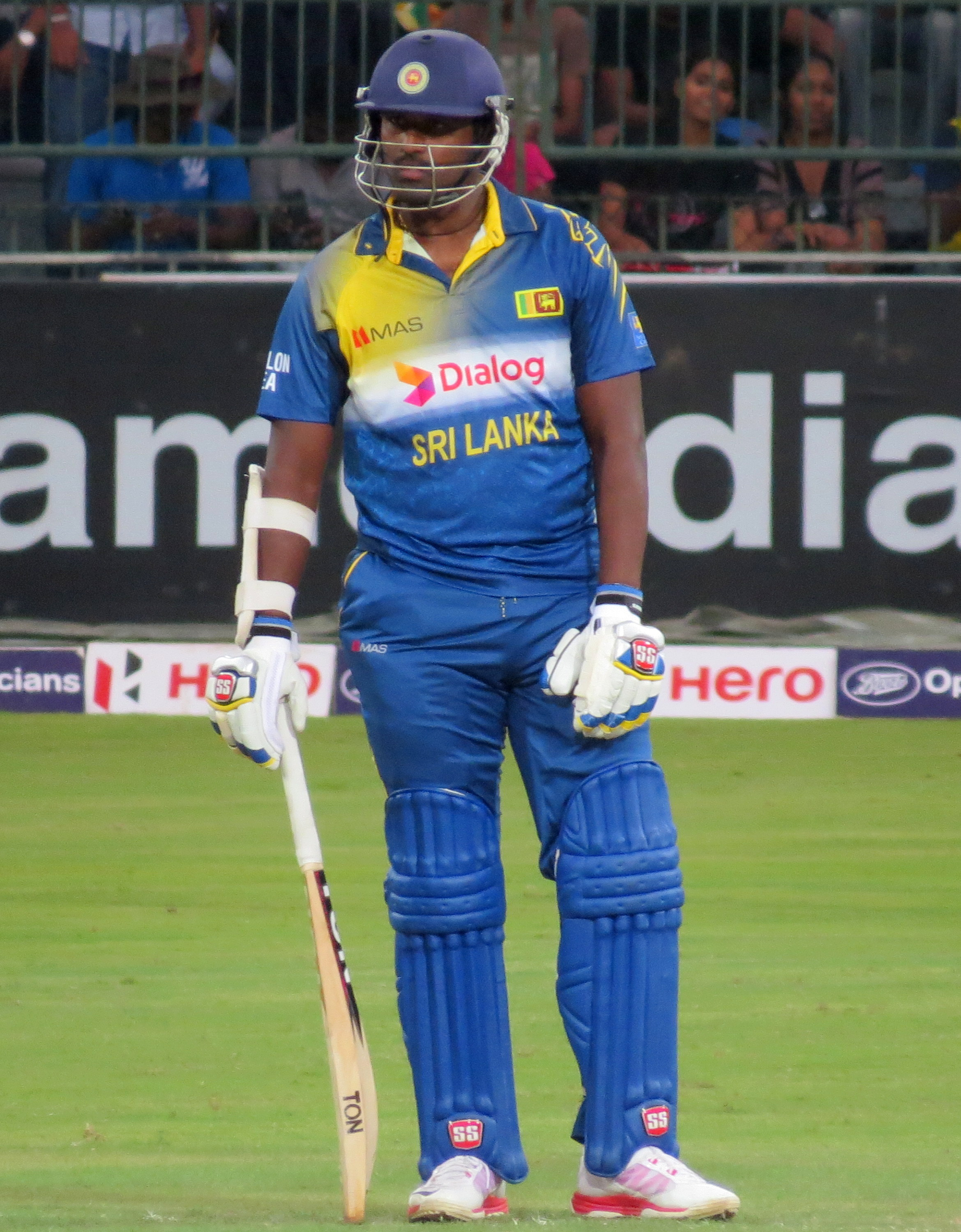
- Perera playing for Sri Lanka in 2014

Personal information
- Full name: Narangoda Liyanaarachchilage Thisara Chirantha Perera
- Born: 3 April 1989 (age 37); Colombo, Sri Lanka
- Nickname: Panda, TP
- Height: 1.86 m (6 ft 1 in)
- Batting: Left-handed
- Bowling: Right-arm medium-fast
- Role: Bowling all-rounder

International information
- National side: Sri Lanka (2009–2021)
- Test debut (cap 115): 26 May 2011 v England
- Last Test: 8 July 2012 v Pakistan
- ODI debut (cap 141): 24 December 2009 v India
- Last ODI: 14 March 2021 v West Indies
- ODI shirt no.: 1
- T20I debut (cap 36): 3 May 2010 v Zimbabwe
- Last T20I: 7 March 2021 v West Indies
- T20I shirt no.: 1

Domestic team information
- Years: Team
- 2008/09–2013/14: Colts Cricket Club
- 2010: Chennai Super Kings
- 2011: Kochi Tuskers Kerala
- 2012: Mumbai Indians
- 2013: Sunrisers Hyderabad
- 2014–2015: Kings XI Punjab
- 2014/15–2018/19: Sinhalese Sports Club
- 2015, 2017: Rangpur Riders
- 2016: Rising Pune Supergiants
- 2017–2018: Quetta Gladiators (squad no. 16)
- 2017–2018: Gloucestershire
- 2019/20–present: Sri Lanka Army Sports Club
- 2020–2023: Jaffna Kings
- 2022: Khulna Tigers
- 2023: Sylhet Strikers
- 2024: Colombo Strikers
- 2024–2025: Dhaka Capitals

Career statistics
Competition	Test	ODI	T20I
Matches	6	166	84
Runs scored	203	2,338	1,204
Batting average	20.30	19.98	23.15
100s/50s	0/1	1/10	0/3
Top score	75	140	61
Balls bowled	954	5,900	1,102
Wickets	11	175	51
Bowling average	59.36	32.80	33.66
5 wickets in innings	0	4	0
10 wickets in match	0	0	0
Best bowling	4/151	6/44	3/24
Catches/stumpings	1/–	62/–	30/–
Medal record
Men's Cricket
Representing Sri Lanka
ICC Cricket World Cup
Runner-up	2011 India–Bangladesh–Sri Lanka
ICC T20 World Cup
Winner	2014 Bangladesh
South Asian Games
Silver medal – second place	2010 Dhaka	Team
- Source: ESPNcricinfo, 11 March 2023

Narangoda Liyanaarachchige Thisara Chirantha Perera (Sinhala: තිසර පෙරේරා; born 3 April 1989), popularly known as Thisara Perera, is a former Sri Lankan international cricketer who played all formats for the national team. He also captained the team in limited-overs formats. Domestically he plays for Sri Lanka Army Sports Club in the Premier Trophy and Premier Limited-Overs Tournament, and the Jaffna Stallions in the Lanka Premier League. Perera has played franchise T20 cricket all around the world for numerous leagues. Primarily a bowling all-rounder, he is an aggressive left-handed batsman who can hit big sixes in death overs and is a useful right-arm medium-fast bowler.

Perera was a part of the Sri Lankan team that won the 2014 ICC World Twenty20, and scored the winning boundary in the final. In Australia he is known by his nickname "panda", which was bestowed upon him by George Bailey during his stint in the BBL with the Brisbane Heat, although he prefers "TP".

On 26 July 2013 against South Africa, Perera hit Robin Peterson for 35 runs in one over (6, Wd, 6, 6, 6, 4, 6), which is recorded as the second most expensive over in ODI history. On 28 March 2021 Perera became the first Sri Lankan to hit six sixes in an over, doing so for the Sri Lanka Army Sports Club against Bloomfield. The bowler on the receiving end was the part-time off-spinner Dilhan Cooray.

On 3 May 2021, Perera announced his retirement from international cricket, however he confirmed that he would continue to play domestic and franchise cricket.

== Early career ==
Thisara Perera started his cricket career as a teenager at St. Anthony's College, Wattala. He later attended the prestigious St. Joseph's College, Colombo, which has produced Sri Lankan cricketers such as Chaminda Vaas, Angelo Mathews and Dimuth Karunaratne. He represented Sri Lanka at various youth levels, and was selected for the 2008 ICC Under-19 Cricket World Cup. In November 2008, he made his first class debut for the Colts Cricket Club. He has picked up 41 wickets in 18 U19 ODIs. He is also the leading wicket taker for the Sri Lanka under-19 team without grabbing a fifer in his career.

== International career ==
=== ODI career ===
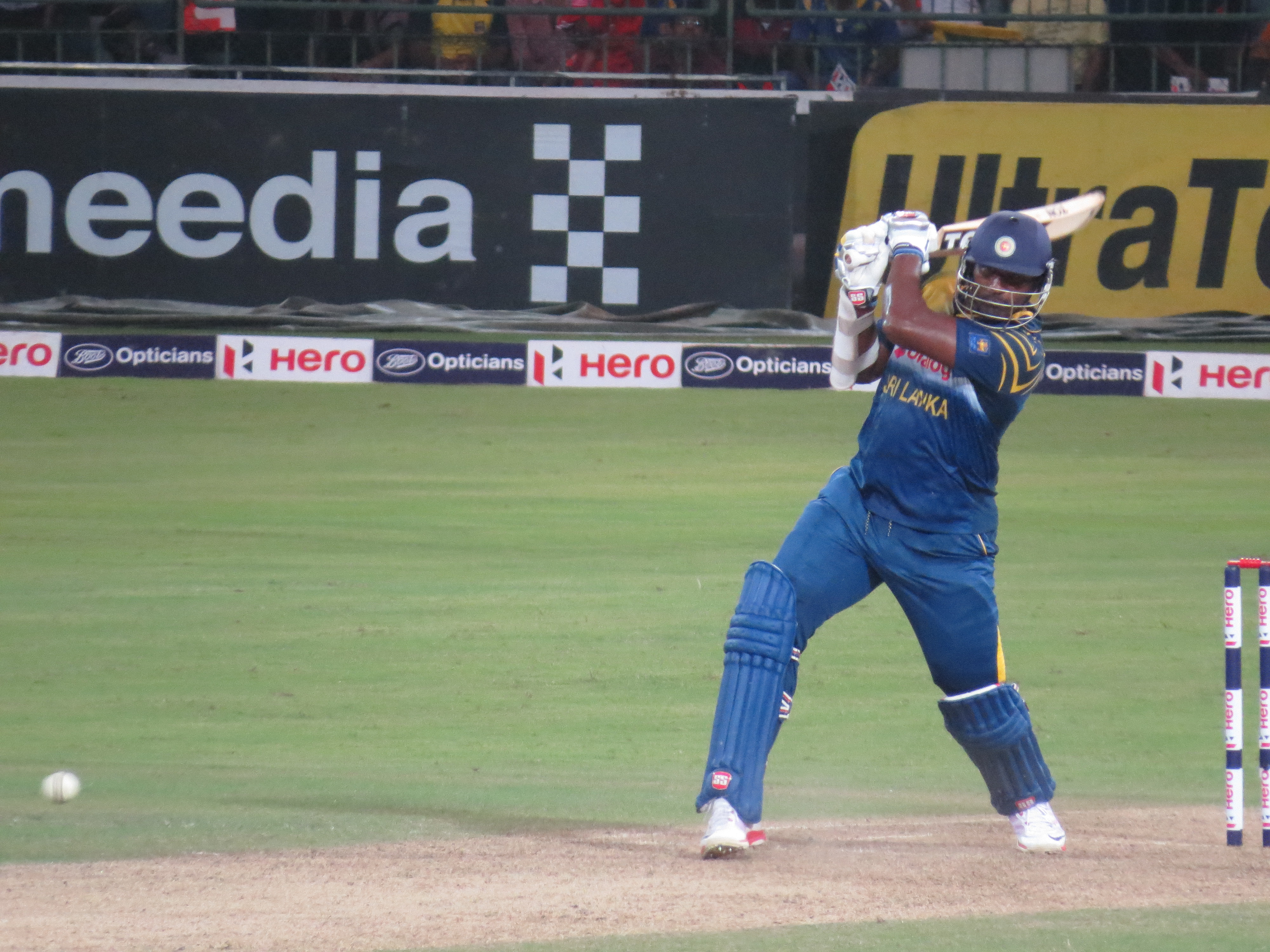
Perera batting against England

Perera made his international debut for Sri Lanka in December 2009, in a late call-up to play in an ODI against India in Kolkata. He took his first five-wicket haul in international cricket in August 2010, earning him the player of the match award in an ODI victory over India. He took five wickets in an ODI against Australia on the same tour.

Perera was a member of Sri Lanka's squad for the 2011 Cricket World Cup in Sri Lanka, India and Bangladesh. He was part of the team defeated in the final of the tournament by India, scoring 22 not out off ten deliveries and taking the wicket of Gautam Gambhir. He was not selected for the Test series against Pakistan later in the year, being retained only for the ODI and Twenty20 teams, but was recalled to the Test team for the end-of-year tour of South Africa He played two ODIs on the tour and scored his first half-century in the format—69 not out off 44 balls—to help Sri Lanka to victory in the fourth of the five-match series in Kimberley. In the 2nd ODI of 2012 series between Pakistan and Sri Lanka, he done brilliant late-order hitting and became first ever person to take 6 wickets against Pakistan in an ODI - his career best. This performance won him the Man of the Match as well. In the 4th ODI of the same series, he shocked Pakistan by taking a hat-trick and managing a run-out in his maiden over took the wicket of saajid and became first Sri Lankan to register a hat-trick against Pakistan.

Perera also has the record for the highest ODI score for Sri Lanka when batting at number 9 position or lower when he scored unbeaten 80 runs.

On 5 January 2019, in the second ODI against New Zealand, Perera scored his first century in ODIs, when he made 140 runs from 74 balls. It was the fastest century against New Zealand in ODIs, coming from 57 balls. Perera also scored thirteen sixes in his innings, the most by a Sri Lankan batsman in an ODI, and the most sixes by a batsman on the losing team in an ODI match.

=== Test career ===
He was selected in Sri Lanka's Test squad for a series against England. He made his debut in the first Test of the series at Sophia Gardens, Cardiff. In an innings defeat, he scored 25 and 20 with the bat and took no wickets. He was not selected for the Test series against Pakistan later in the year, being retained only for the ODI and Twenty20 teams, but was recalled to the Test team for the end-of-year tour of South Africa. He played in all three Tests of the tour, scoring 81 runs and taking five wickets.

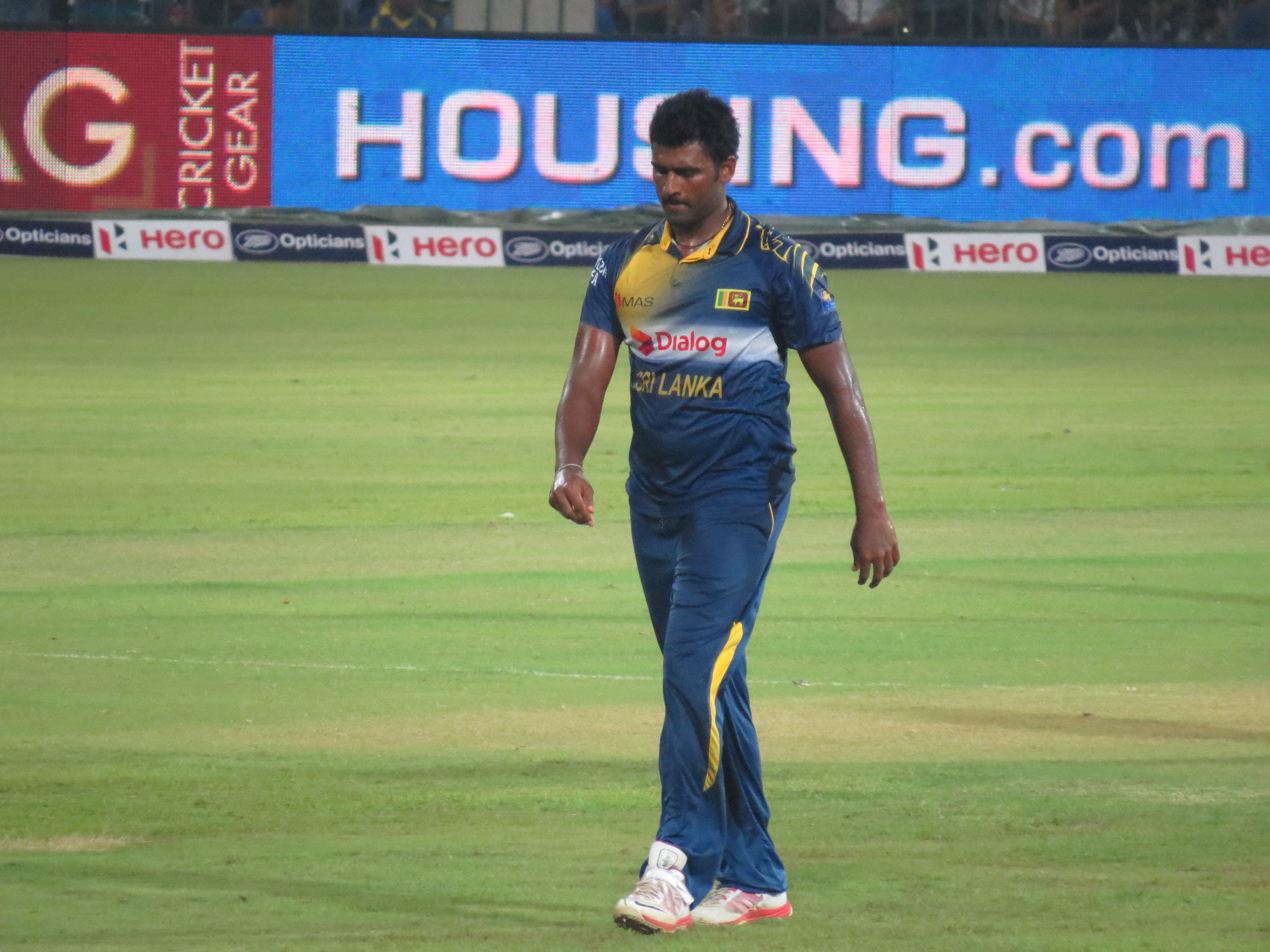
Perera preparing to bowl

=== T20 international career ===
In May 2010, he made his Twenty20 international debut, representing Sri Lanka in the ICC World Twenty20 in the West Indies. He was a member of the Sri Lankan team that in October 2010 inflicted Australia's first defeat in a Twenty20 international in Australia, bringing up Sri Lanka's final 16 runs to win the match off three deliveries.

Perera also contributed to the win 2014 ICC World Twenty20 championship which was Sri Lanka's first World T20I title. In that innings against India in the final, Perera had an unbeaten partnership with Kumar Sangakkara and hit the winning boundary.

He also took a hat-trick on 12 February 2016 in a T20I series against India, which is the fourth overall and first by a Sri Lankan. However, he was gone for nought in batting and Sri Lanka lost the match by 69 runs.

He has played the most number of T20I innings(45) for Sri Lanka without scoring a T20I fifty and also holds the record for scoring most number of T20I runs for Sri Lanka without hitting any fifties.

He too has the record for the highest individual score for Sri Lanka when batting at number 7 position or lower in Twenty20 International (49) and also jointly holds the record for Sri Lanka for the highest score batting at number 8 position in T20I along with Angelo Mathews(35*)

In August 2017, he was named in a World XI team to play three Twenty20 International matches against Pakistan in the 2017 Independence Cup in Lahore. In the second T20I of the series, Perera took 2 wickets and scored an unbeaten 19-ball 47 runs to lift the World XI to win by 7 wickets. The score highlighted by five huge sixes and Perera won the man of the match award for his match winning all-round performances.

In April 2018, he was named in the Rest of the World XI squad for the one-off T20I against the West Indies, to be played at Lord's on 31 May 2018.

=== Captaincy ===
In October 2017, against Pakistan he was named as captain for Sri Lanka for 3 match T20I series. This announcement came after Sri Lanka Cricket confirmed that the fixture in Lahore would go ahead as planned and their limited-overs captain, Upul Tharanga, had pulled out of the match due to security reasons. Ahead of the T20I in Lahore, Cricket Sri Lanka's president Thilanga Sumathipala said that the team was privileged to be in Pakistan and that he would help support the country in hosting more tours. Najam Sethi, chairman of the PCB, said that this fixture would be the start of international cricket returning to the country, with him expecting every country to play in Pakistan by the end of 2020. Despite all those efforts, Sri Lanka suffered another whitewash and lost the T20I series 3–0.

On 29 November 2017, Perera was named as Sri Lanka's captain for the ODI and T20I matches against India, replacing Upul Tharanga. The change came due to poor performance and whitewash losses under Tharanga's captaincy.

His first ODI captaincy came in the first ODI against India at Dharamsala. In the match, Perera won the toss and elected to field first. The result gave full sorts of validity, where the Sri Lankan pacers led by Suranga Lakmal devastated the Indian batting line up. At one time, India were seven down for just 39 runs, until MS Dhoni paced the innings to reach India's total over hundred. Finally India scored 112 runs and Perera took the wicket of Dhoni as the final wicket of the innings. This 112 ranked as India's third-lowest in ODIs at home and their lowest at home when batting first. Sri Lanka comfortably won the match by 7 wickets and finished their 12 ODI loss streak as well. Finally, Sri Lanka lost the ODI series 1–2. In the T20I series, Sri Lanka suffered a 3 loss whitewash, by giving 6 consecutive losses under Perera's captaincy.

=== Post captaincy ===
In May 2018, he was one of 33 cricketers to be awarded a national contract by Sri Lanka Cricket ahead of the 2018–19 season.

During the 3-match ODI series against New Zealand, Perera appeared as the rescue man for Sri Lanka. In the first ODI, however he was hammered for 34 runs by Jimmy Neesham in the penultimate over (6, 6, 6, 6, NB2, 6, 1). Having started the over with figures of 9-0-46-2, Thisara finished with 10-0-80-2.

In the second ODI, Perera scored his maiden ODI century, which broke several world records. His century off 57 balls was the fastest against New Zealand. Perera's 13 sixes beat the Sri Lanka record of 11, which had been held by Sanath Jayasuriya since 1996. Perera thrashed 13 sixes and eight fours on his way to 140 off 74 balls, which is recorded as the joint highest individual score by a Sri Lankan against New Zealand (along with Jayasuriya's 140 in 1994). Despite Perera's onslaught, Sri Lanka lost the match by 21 runs, where he dismissed as the last wicket in 47th over. His 13 sixes is the most sixes by a batsman on the losing team in ODIs. Due to brilliant batting performance, Perera was adjudged man of the match.

In the third ODI, Perera continued his heroics with a quick 80. New Zealand batted first and posted mighty 364 on the board. Sri Lankan chase started successfully, but wickets at regular intervals slowed the progress. Perera crashing three sixes and seven fours in his 80 runs, but he soon dismissed by a magnificent catch taken by Martin Guptill. Sri Lanka lost the match by 113 runs and lost the series 3–0.

In April 2019, he was named in Sri Lanka's squad for the 2019 Cricket World Cup. The International Cricket Council (ICC) named Perera as the key player of Sri Lanka's squad for the tournament.

=== Retirement ===
On 3 May 2021, Perera announced that he had retired from across all formats of international cricket. It was reported that he retired from international cricket following pay dispute with the Sri Lanka Cricket Board and also reports emerged regarding the intentions of SLC to axe several senior players from the national team in the limited overs matches to nurture and give opportunities to the youngsters.

== Domestic and franchise cricket ==
=== Sri Lankan domestic career ===
Perera made his List A and first-class debuts for Colts Cricket Club on in November 2008. Barely a year later he was called up to the national team and made his senior international debut.

In March 2018, he was named in Colombo's squad for the 2017–18 Super Four Provincial Tournament. The following month, he was also named in Colombo's squad for the 2018 Super Provincial One Day Tournament.

In August 2018, he was named as the captain of Dambulla's squad the 2018 SLC T20 League. In March 2019, he was named in Kandy's squad for the 2019 Super Provincial One Day Tournament.

On 28 March 2021, in a Major Clubs Limited Over Tournament match between Sri Lanka Army Sports Club and Bloomfield Cricket and Athletic Club, Perera hit six sixes in one over off the bowling of Dilhan Cooray. Perera became the first Sri Lankan to achieve this in a domestic cricket match, and he also scored the second-fastest fifty in List A cricket.

=== T20 franchise career ===
Perera was purchased by the Chennai Super Kings for US$50,000 in the auction for the 2010 Indian Premier League. His price increased for the 2011 Indian Premier League, fetching US$80,000 from the Kochi Tuskers Kerala. During the 2016 Indian Premier League auction he was sold to new franchise Rising Pune Supergiants for INR 1 crore in the second round.

On 3 June 2018, he was selected to play for the Montreal Tigers in the players' draft for the inaugural edition of the Global T20 Canada tournament. In September 2018, he was named in Paktia's squad in the first edition of the Afghanistan Premier League tournament. The following month, he was named in the squad for the Comilla Victorians team, following the draft for the 2018–19 Bangladesh Premier League.

In June 2019, he was selected to play for the Montreal Tigers franchise team in the 2019 Global T20 Canada tournament. In November 2019, he was selected to play for the Dhaka Platoon in the 2019–20 Bangladesh Premier League. In October 2020, he was drafted by the Jaffna Stallions for the inaugural edition of the Lanka Premier League. In April 2021, he was signed by Karachi Kings to play in the rescheduled matches in the 2021 Pakistan Super League. In November 2021, he was selected to play for the Jaffna Kings following the players' draft for the 2021 Lanka Premier League. In July 2022, he was signed by the Jaffna Kings for the third edition of the Lanka Premier League.

In September 2022, he was signed by the Gujarat Giants for the 1st edition of the Legends League Cricket. In October 2023, he was drafted for Manipal Tigers.

== Personal life ==
Perera married his girlfriend Sherami Dinulshika at age eighteen. They divorced in 2025. In the same year, he married Nishini Hatharasingha, actress . On 7 July 2025, they welcomed a daughter Thisaraa Aviana Perera. In October 2020, he was commissioned as a Major in the Sri Lanka Army Volunteer Force attached to the Gajaba Regiment.
