= Hurricane Relief T20 Challenge =

Cricket match

	West Indies	World XI
- Date: 31 May 2018
Captains	Carlos Brathwaite	Shahid Afridi

Twenty20 International series
- Results: West Indies won the 1-match series 1–0
Most runs	Evin Lewis (58)	Thisara Perera (61)
Most wickets	Kesrick Williams (3)	Rashid Khan (2)

The Hurricane Relief T20 Challenge was a Twenty20 International (T20I) cricket match that took place in England on 31 May 2018. The West Indies cricket team played against a World XI team, to raise funds for stadiums damaged by Hurricane Irma and Hurricane Maria in September 2017. The damaged stadiums were Ronald Webster Park in Anguilla and Dominica's Windsor Park.

The International Cricket Council (ICC) granted the fixture international status, with Lord's being selected as venue to host the match. In March 2018, the ICC named Eoin Morgan as the captain of the World XI side. The following month, Carlos Brathwaite was named as the captain of the West Indies team. However, two days before the match, Morgan was ruled out of the fixture with a fractured finger, and replaced as captain by Shahid Afridi.

The West Indies won the one-off match by 72 runs.

== Squads ==
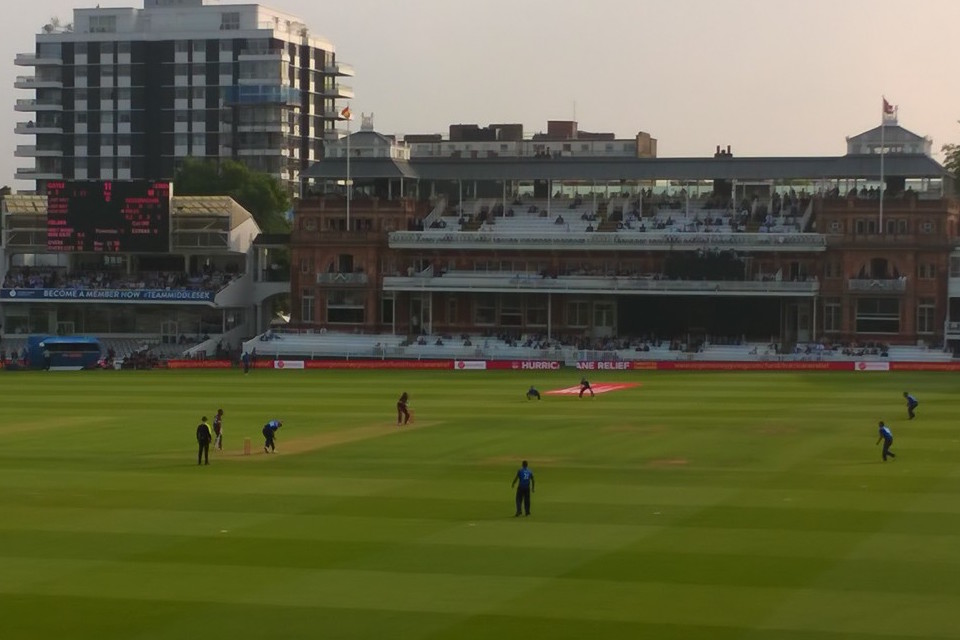
Tymal Mills bowling to Chris Gayle

West Indies	World XI
Carlos Brathwaite (c); Rayad Emrit; Andre Fletcher; Chris Gayle; Evin Lewis; Ashley Nurse; Keemo Paul; Rovman Powell; Denesh Ramdin (wk); Andre Russell; Samuel Badree; Marlon Samuels; Kesrick Williams	~~Eoin Morgan (c)~~; Shahid Afridi (c); Sam Billings (wk); ~~Sam Curran~~; ~~Shakib Al Hasan~~; Tamim Iqbal; Dinesh Karthik (wk); Rashid Khan; Sandeep Lamichhane; Shoaib Malik; Mitchell McClenaghan; Tymal Mills; ~~Hardik Pandya~~; Thisara Perera; Adil Rashid; Luke Ronchi (wk); Mohammed Shami

Shakib Al Hasan was originally named in the World XI team, but withdrew for personal reasons and was replaced with Sandeep Lamichhane. Hardik Pandya was ruled out of the match with a viral illness, and was replaced by Mohammed Shami. Eoin Morgan fractured a finger two days before the game, so had to withdraw from the squad and was replaced by Sam Billings. Sam Curran was added to the squad at the same time, but the next day was called up by the England team for their Test against Pakistan, which started the day after the Lord's game.

== Only T20I ==
31 May 2018
18:00 (N)
Scorecard

West Indies; 199/4 (20 overs)	v	World XI; 127 (16.4 overs)
Evin Lewis 58 (26); Rashid Khan 2/48 (4 overs)		Thisara Perera 61 (37); Kesrick Williams 3/41 (3.4 overs)

West Indies won by 72 runs
Lord's, London
Umpires: Rob Bailey (Eng) and Alex Wharf (Eng)
Player of the match: Evin Lewis (WI)

- World XI won the toss and elected to field.
- Sandeep Lamichhane (World XI) made his T20I debut.
