= 2017 Independence Cup (cricket) =

Cricket tournament

	Pakistan	World XI
- Dates: 12 – 15 September 2017
Captains	Sarfaraz Ahmed	Faf du Plessis

Twenty20 International series
- Results: Pakistan won the 3-match series 2–1
Most runs	Babar Azam (179)	Hashim Amla (119)
Most wickets	Sohail Khan (3); Rumman Raees (3)	Thisara Perera (6)
- Player of the series: Babar Azam (Pak)

2017 Independence Cup official logo

The 2017 Independence Cup was a cricket tournament that took place in Lahore, Pakistan. It was contested between a World XI team and Pakistan across three Twenty20 International (T20I) matches. Pakistan won the series 2–1.

South Africa's Faf du Plessis captained the World XI team, with Sarfaraz Ahmed leading Pakistan. Ten of the players in the Pakistan squad had not previously played in an international match at home. The World XI side arrived in Lahore a day before the first fixture under high security. The cup was named in commemoration of Pakistan's 70th year of independence.

The International Cricket Council (ICC) appointed Richie Richardson as the match referee for the fixtures, the first time the ICC has sent an official to oversee cricket matches in Pakistan since 2009. Aleem Dar, Ahsan Raza, Ahmed Shahab and Shozab Raza were appointed as the on-field umpires. The Pakistan Cricket Board (PCB) introduced the #CricketKiHalalala hashtag for the series.

The PCB spent an estimated $3 million to host the three matches, with players on the World XI team being paid approximately $100,000 each. The ICC contributed more than $1 million towards security costs. While attendance for the first two matches were as high as 90%, this was down on the crowd numbers for the final of the 2017 Pakistan Super League. Higher ticket pricing was to blame for the drop in attendance, with some tickets being given to local schools as a result. The ICC and PCB looked at the possibility for further World XI tours to Pakistan in the next two years, with the priority for more Full Member sides to tour.

Following the conclusion of the series, Faf du Plessis said how much it meant for the people of Pakistan and that it hopefully will bring cricket back to the country. Sarfraz Ahmed said that he was thankful to the World XI team and that "I expect these players to return back to Pakistan with full squads to play a full Test series". The ICC congratulated Pakistan for hosting the tournament, with the aim to get bilateral international cricket returning to Pakistan. The following month, the Sri Lanka cricket team played a T20I in Lahore against Pakistan.

== Squads ==
T20Is
Pakistan	World XI
Sarfaraz Ahmed (c, wk); Fakhar Zaman; Ahmed Shehzad; Babar Azam; Shoaib Malik; Umar Amin; Imad Wasim; Shadab Khan; Mohammad Nawaz; Faheem Ashraf; Hasan Ali; Aamer Yamin; Mohammad Amir; Rumman Raees; Usman Khan; Sohail Khan	Faf du Plessis (c); Hashim Amla; Samuel Badree; George Bailey; Paul Collingwood; Ben Cutting; Grant Elliott; Tamim Iqbal; David Miller; Morné Morkel; Tim Paine (wk); Thisara Perera; Imran Tahir; Daren Sammy

== T20I series ==
=== 1st T20I ===
12 September 2017
19:00 (N)
Scorecard

Pakistan; 197/5 (20 overs)	v	World XI; 177/7 (20 overs)
Babar Azam 86 (52); Thisara Perera 2/51 (4 overs)		Daren Sammy 29* (16); Sohail Khan 2/28 (4 overs)

Pakistan won by 20 runs
Gaddafi Stadium, Lahore
Umpires: Aleem Dar (Pak) and Ahsan Raza (Pak)
Player of the match: Babar Azam (Pak)

- World XI won the toss and elected to field.
- Faheem Ashraf (Pak) made his T20I debut.

=== 2nd T20I ===
13 September 2017
19:00 (N)
Scorecard

Pakistan; 174/6 (20 overs)	v	World XI; 175/3 (19.5 overs)
Babar Azam 45 (38); Thisara Perera 2/23 (3 overs)		Hashim Amla 72* (55); Mohammad Nawaz 1/25 (3 overs)

World XI won by 7 wickets
Gaddafi Stadium, Lahore
Umpires: Shozab Raza (Pak) and Ahmed Shahab (Pak)
Player of the match: Thisara Perera (World XI)

- Pakistan won the toss and elected to bat.
- This was the first defeat for Pakistan in a T20I in Pakistan.
- Shoaib Malik (Pak) became the highest run-scorer in T20Is for Pakistan.

=== 3rd T20I ===
15 September 2017
19:00 (N)
Scorecard

Pakistan; 183/4 (20 Overs)	v	World XI; 150/8 (20 overs)
Ahmed Shehzad 89 (55); Thisara Perera 2/37 (4 overs)		Thisara Perera 32 (13); Hasan Ali 2/28 (4 overs)

Pakistan won by 33 runs
Gaddafi Stadium, Lahore
Umpires: Ahsan Raza (Pak) and Shozab Raza (Pak)
Player of the match: Ahmed Shehzad (Pak)

- World XI won the toss and elected to field.
