= Hashim Amla =

South African cricketer

Hashim Amla OIS
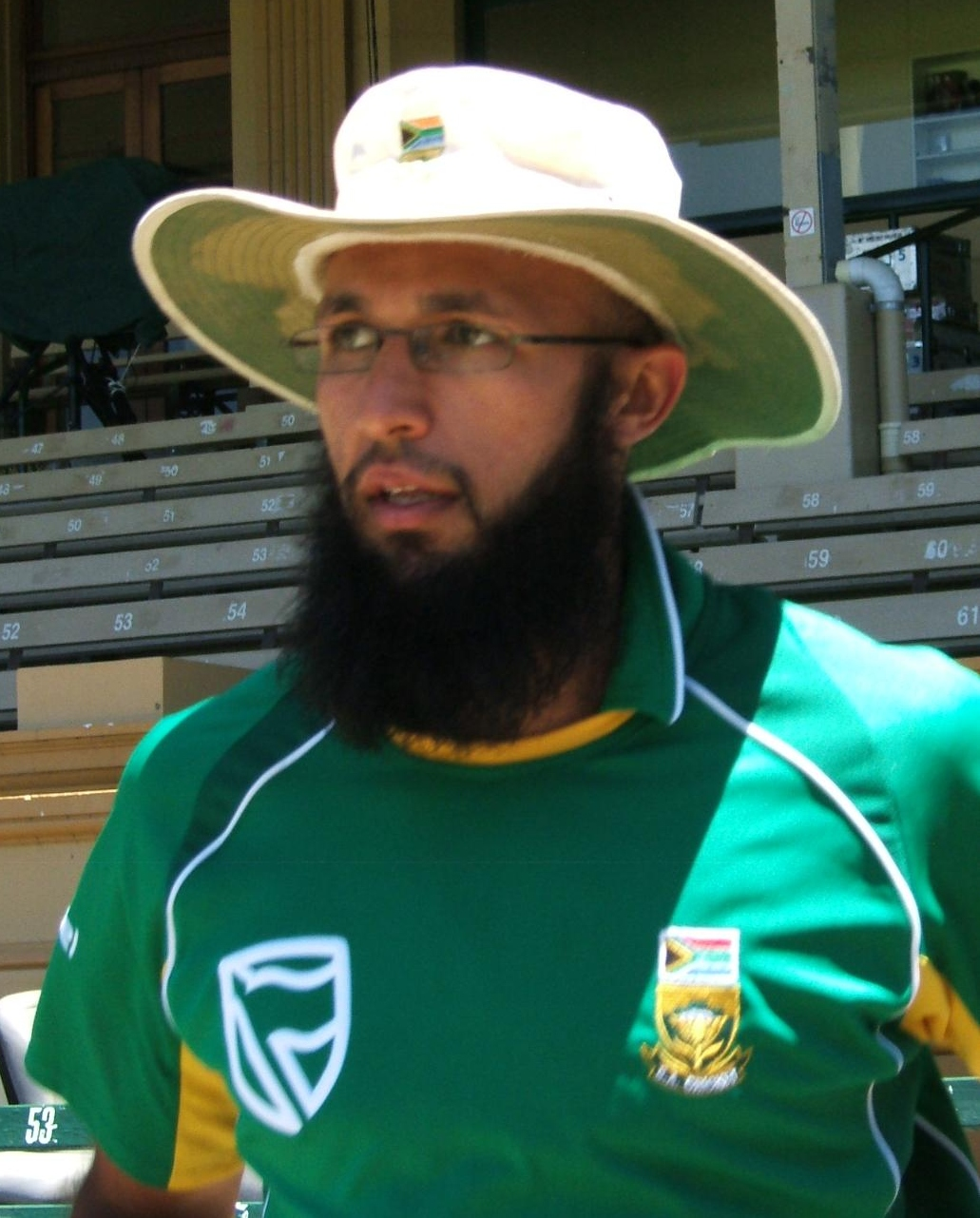
- Amla in 2009

Personal information
- Full name: Hashim Mahomed Amla
- Born: 31 March 1983 (age 43); Durban, Natal Province, South Africa
- Height: 5 ft 9 in (1.75 m)
- Batting: Right-handed
- Bowling: Right-arm off break
- Role: Top-order batter
- Relatives: Ahmed Amla (brother)

International information
- National side: South Africa (2004–2019)
- Test debut (cap 295): 28 November 2004 v India
- Last Test: 21 February 2019 v Sri Lanka
- ODI debut (cap 90): 9 March 2008 v Bangladesh
- Last ODI: 28 June 2019 v Sri Lanka
- ODI shirt no.: 90 and 1
- T20I debut (cap 38): 13 January 2009 v Australia
- Last T20I: 14 August 2018 v Sri Lanka
- T20I shirt no.: 1

Domestic team information
- Years: Team
- 1999/00–2008/09: KwaZulu-Natal
- 2003/04–2011/12: Dolphins
- 2009: Essex
- 2010: Nottinghamshire
- 2013–2014: Surrey
- 2013/14–2018/19: Cape Cobras
- 2015: Derbyshire
- 2016–2017: Kings XI Punjab
- 2016: Trinbago Knight Riders
- 2018: Hampshire
- 2018: Barbados Tridents
- 2018: Durban Heat
- 2019/20: Khulna Tigers
- Surrey

Career statistics
Competition	Test	ODI	T20I	FC
Matches	124	181	44	265
Runs scored	9,282	8,113	1,277	19,521
Batting average	46.64	49.46	33.60	48.55
100s/50s	28/41	27/39	0/8	57/93
Top score	311*	159	97*	311*
Balls bowled	54	–	–	393
Wickets	0	–	–	1
Bowling average	–	–	–	277.00
5 wickets in innings	0	–	–	0
10 wickets in match	0	–	–	0
Best bowling	–	–	–	1/10
Catches/stumpings	108/–	87/–	19/–	192/–
- Source: ESPNcricinfo, 5 February 2023

Hashim Mahomed Amla OIS (born 31 March 1983) is a South African former cricketer who played for the national team from 2004 to 2019. A right-handed batter, he is South Africa's second-highest run-scorer in Tests and third-highest in One Day Internationals (ODIs), with 55 international centuries across both formats. He also played Twenty20 Internationals (T20s).

Amla served as the captain in several international matches from early to mid-2010s. With a professional career spanning from 1999/2000 to 2022, he represented several domestic and franchise cricket teams around the world.

== Personal life ==
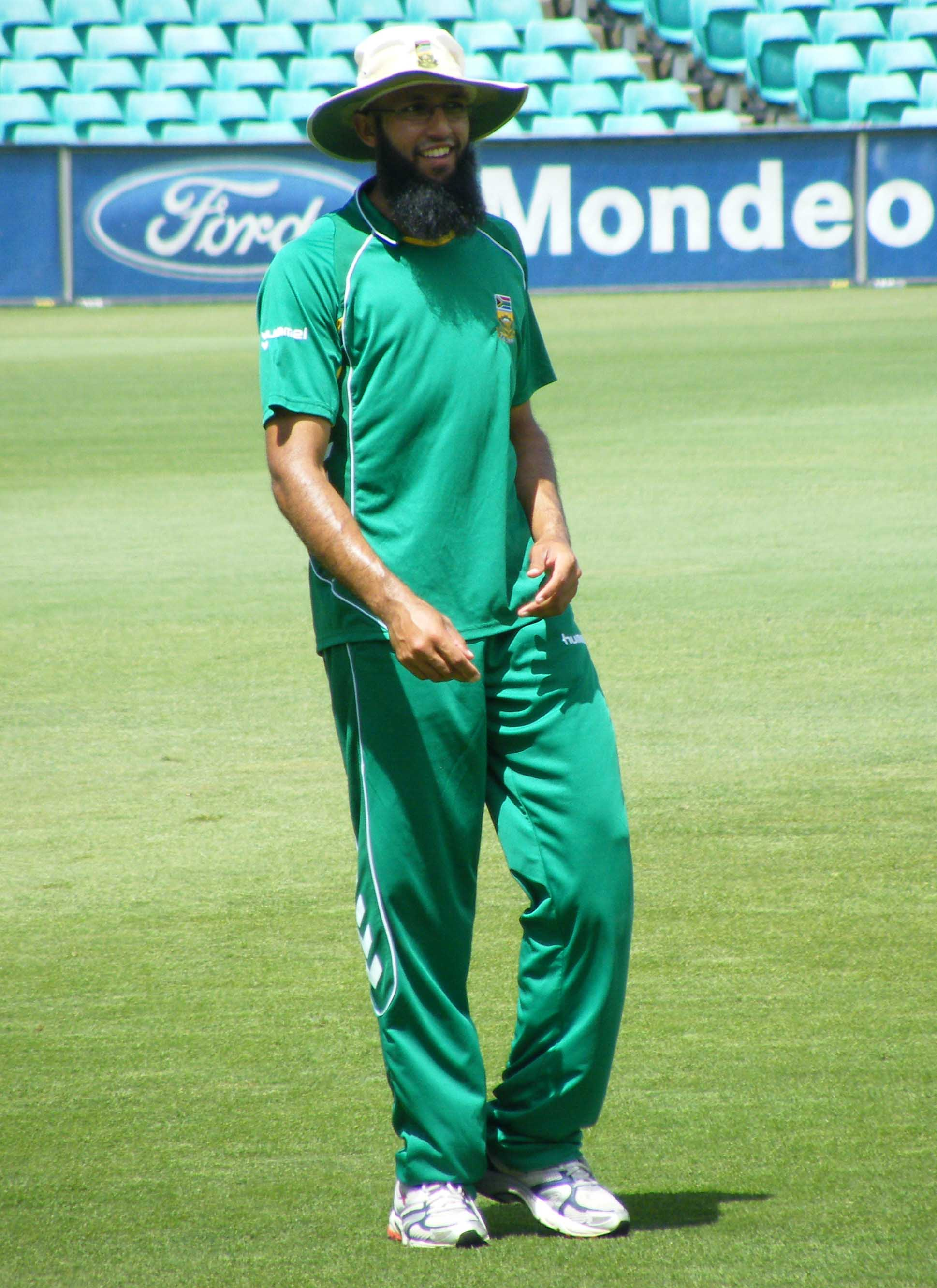
Amla at practicing at the Adelaide Oval, January 2009

Born in Durban, Amla is a devout Muslim. He is of Indian descent; his grandfather had migrated to South Africa from Surat, India, in 1927. He was raised in a middle-class home and sent to the Durban High School, which is also the alma mater of Lance Klusener and Barry Richards. His elder brother, Ahmed Amla, was also a professional cricketer. Ahmed made his debut two years earlier than Hashim and they played together for a time at the KwaZulu-Natal Dolphins. Amla married Sumaiyah and they have two children.

== Early years ==
Upon graduating from Durban High School and impressing on the youth circuit, Amla made his debut for his provincial team, the KwaZulu-Natal Dolphins, soon captaining South Africa at the 2002 Under-19 Cricket World Cup in New Zealand, leading his team to the final. During his formative years, former Western Province captain and coach Hylton Ackerman had been influential in Amla's development, first spotting his talent and honing his skills during his coaching career. His promise led him to being appointed captain of KwaZulu-Natal at the young age of 21. Amla was cited as a future captain of South Africa ever since his first-class years. Amla moved from the Dolphins to Cape Cobras in 2013.

== Domestic and T20 franchise career ==
Amla played for the Trinbago Knight Riders in the Caribbean Premier League (CPL). He has scored 410 runs in 11 matches with a strike rate of 126.54.

Amla was picked for the 2016 Indian Premier League (IPL) by the Kings XI Punjab as a replacement for Shaun Marsh, after the latter's injury. Since then, he has proved to be an integral part of the team's batting lineup. He has scored 577 runs in 16 matches, which included two centuries and three half-centuries. He was named in the Cricbuzz IPL XI of the tournament. In the 2018 IPL auction, Amla went unsold despite making 577 runs with 2 centuries at an average of 44.38.

In October 2018, he was named in Durban Heat's squad for the first edition of the Mzansi Super League Twenty20 tournament. Just before the 2020 Pakistan Super League season, Hashim Amla replaced Younus Khan as batting mentor for Peshawar Zalmi.

In April 2021, he was named in Western Province's squad, ahead of the 2021–22 cricket season in South Africa.

== International career ==
Upon being appointed captain of the Dolphins, Amla began the 2004–2005 South African domestic season by scoring four centuries during his first eight innings. His success at the domestic level and consistent performances for the South Africa A squad led to him being chosen for the winter 2004 tour of Africa at the age of 21, thereby becoming the first South African of Indian descent to represent South Africa in international cricket.

Making his debut at Eden Gardens, Kolkata, on 28 November 2004, he initially made a slow start to his career, with his technique having been criticized after scoring 36 runs in the 2004 series against England. After honing his technique and working on his skills with the Dolphins, for whom he regularly top-scored in the South African domestic circuit, he proved his critics wrong in 2006 as he scored a comeback 149 against New Zealand at Newlands, Cape Town, helping guide South Africa to a match-saving draw. He subsequently continued this success, earning a national contract and scoring 1599 runs at an average of 57.10 in his next 19 Tests, solidifying his position as South Africa's regular number 3 batsman. On 27 March 2008, he scored an unbeaten 159 against India in Chennai amidst searing conditions. His success throughout the 2008 year, in which he scored 1012 runs, consisted of numerous centuries and solid performances against India, England and Australia. During South Africa's 2009 tour of Australia, Amla helped South Africa win a historic Test and one day series victory over Australia, scoring 259 runs at an average of 51.80 during the Tests and contributing crucial scores in the one day series, including a match-winning 80 in the series clincher.

Amla has had four spells playing county cricket in England, for Essex in 2009, Nottinghamshire in 2010, Surrey in 2013 and Derbyshire in 2015. In April 2009, he was signed by Essex as their overseas player for a portion of the 2009 English county season, as a short-term replacement for Danish Kaneria. During his stay at the club, he scored two centuries in two Championship matches, including a match-saving 181 on his debut, the highest score by an Essex debutant, as well as 111 runs off 107 in his first Pro40 match, against Sussex. Essex fans had warmed to him throughout his stay, affectionately calling him "W. G." in reference to W. G. Grace.

During England's 2009–2010 tour of South Africa, Amla was an integral member of the team throughout the series, scoring a crucial century in the first Test at Centurion and contributing important innings during the rest of the series. His performances saw him move up the ICC Test batting rankings.

=== 2010 ===
Amla started 2010 in February with a two-match Test series against India in India. In the first Test he scored 253* as South Africa reached 558. After this a superb bowling performance from Dale Steyn meant that India were bowled out for 233 with Steyn bagging seven wickets. India were bowled out for 319 after being forced to follow-on as South Africa won by an innings and six runs. In the second Test match Amla made 114 before being caught by MS Dhoni. Despite Amla's century the remaining South African batting order could only manage 296. India batted and scored 643 with centuries from Virender Sehwag, Sachin Tendulkar, VVS Laxman and MS Dhoni. The South African chase collapsed poorly but Amla still managed another century scoring 123* as South Africa were bowled out for 290 and crashed to an innings defeat. After this Amla toured the West Indies for 5 ODIs and three Test matches. Amla top-scored in the first ODI with 102 as South Africa coasted to a comfortable victory. He followed this up with 92 in the second ODI as South Africa again sealed a 17 run victory. In the third ODI, Amla scored 30, but in the fourth ODI he returned with a century by scoring 129 off 115 balls. He made 45 in the fifth and final ODI before he was run-out by Kieron Pollard as South Africa won narrowly by one wicket.

The three-match Test series was one where Amla performed consistently but didn't register any centuries, he top scored with 44. The first Test was a poor one for Amla scoring 2 and 5 as South Africa still won comfortably. In the following Test he scored 44 and 41 as the match was drawn, he scored 5 and 25 in the final Test match as South Africa won by seven wickets.

In the three-match ODI series against Zimbabwe, Amla scored 110 as South Africa gave Zimbabwe 351 to win and South Africa won the match by 64 runs. The second ODI saw Amla score 110 as South Africa cruised to an 8 wicket victory and sealed the three match series with one game to spare. Amla had a quiet final ODI scoring 24 as South Africa won by 264 runs.

Amla went into a five-match ODI series against Pakistan on the back of good form and in the first ODI managed 35 as South Africa won by 8 wickets. Amla scored a quickfire half century in the second ODI before being given out lbw to a Shahid Afridi leg break, despite this good knock from Amla and 286 from South Africa, they couldn't win the match courtesy of a superb century by Abdul Razzaq scoring 109 off just 73 balls. In the third ODI Amla scored 119* as the rest of the South African order collapsed around him and the team only managed 228, however South Africa won the match by just two runs courtesy of some superb death bowling yorkers from Rusty Theron.

Following these performances in the ODI format Amla was selected in the 12-man Twenty20 squad against India, at the Moses Mabhida Stadium in Durban. He was selected in place of opener Loots Bosman. It was the final match for iconic fast bowler Makhaya Ntini, known for being one of the greatest personalities in modern cricket.

For his performances in 2010 and 2011, he was named in the World Test XI by the ICC.

=== 2012 ===
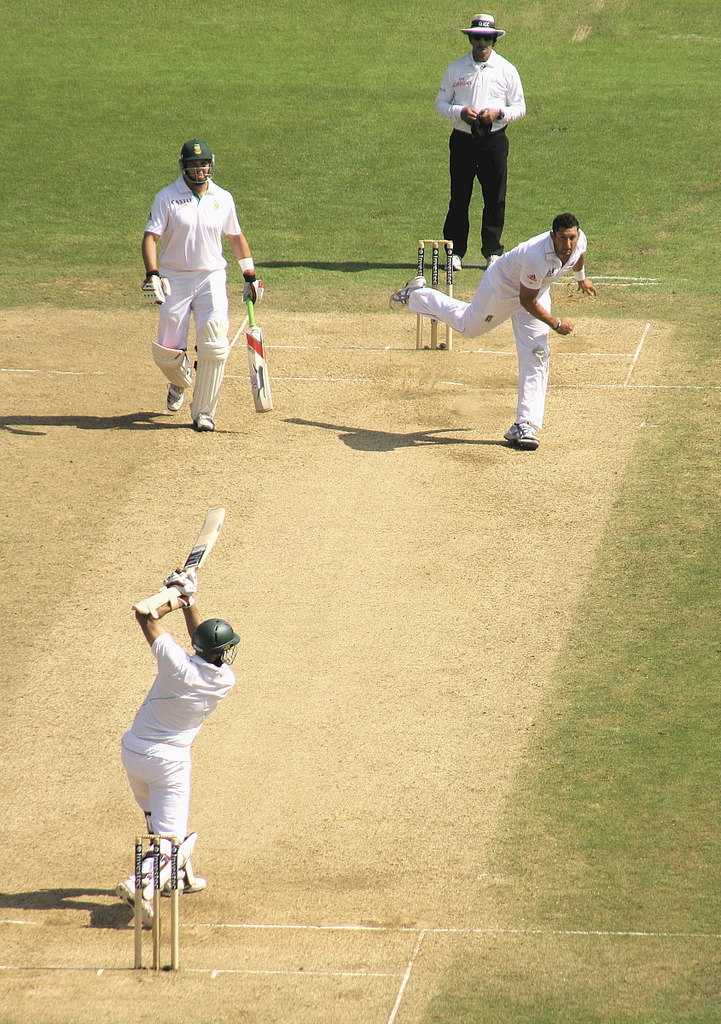
Amla playing a drive, the shot that got him to triple century at The Oval

During the Proteas tour of England, he scored the highest ever Test score by a South African and the country's first triple century while playing in the 1st Test at The Oval. He scored 311 not out in a man of the match performance while fasting as South Africa defeated England by an innings and 12 runs. He then scored his 16th Test century in the 2nd innings of the 3rd Test at Lord's, as South Africa beat England by 51 runs to clinch the series by 2–0 and ascended to the top of the ICC Test rankings. He was South Africa's man of the series and during the ODI series that followed, he scored a career-best 150 (from 124 balls) in the 2nd match against England in Southampton.

They then toured to Australia, where Amla scored 104 and shared a 165 run 3rd wicket partnership with Jacques Kallis in the 1st Test at the Gabba, Amla and Kallis are the most prolific partnership in South Africa's Test match history. In the 3rd Test at the WACA, Amla scored 196 in the 2nd innings in a match-winning, series-clinching effort. Together with Graeme Smith, their 2nd wicket stand of 178 in 2 while his century came up in 87 balls.

For his performances in 2012, he was named in the World Test XI by the ICC and ESPNcricinfo. He was also named in the ODI XI of the year by ESPNcricinfo.

=== 2013 ===
During bilateral series against New Zealand in January 2013, Amla was requested to lead the team due to suspension of regular captain AB de Villiers for 2 matches due to slow overrate, that Amla declined requesting to be left to "concentrate on his batting". In August 2013, it was announced that Amla had signed for Surrey, for whom he made a limited number of appearances in domestic matches.

For his performances in 2013, he was named both in the World Test XI and ODI XI by the ICC. He was also named in the Test XI for 2013 by ESPNcricinfo.

=== 2014 ===
In June 2014, Amla became South Africa's first permanent non-white Test captain (although Ashwell Prince had it temporarily), ahead of the Sri Lanka tour following Graeme Smith's retirement. Amla captained his team to a historic victory against Sri Lanka in his first Test series as captain. He continued to make domestic appearances for Surrey when other commitments allowed.

=== 2015 ===
In January 2015, he was named man of the series in a bilateral series against the West Indies. In August 2015, he was named man of the match against New Zealand for his match winning century. He was included in the Boland cricket team squad for the 2015 Africa T20 Cup.

For his performances in 2015, he was named in the World ODI XI by ICC.

=== 2016 ===
In January 2016, Amla stepped down as South Africa captain following a drawn Test against England at Newlands. This was preceded by his poor run of form and his team's poor performance against India in November 2015. His team lost the first Test against England in the home series. The second Test, the one after which Amla announced his resignation, ended in a draw after a double hundred from the South African captain.

During the first Test against Sri Lanka at St George's Park, Amla was dismissed lbw to Nuwan Pradeep in the second innings, becoming the 10,000th lbw victim in Test cricket history.

=== 2017 ===
During the third Test against Sri Lanka on 12 January 2017, Amla played his 100th Test, becoming the 8th South African to play 100 Test matches. By ending 9 innings without a fifty in recent Test tours, Amla finally scored his 26th century in his 100th match and regained his Test average over 50 as well. With that century, Amla became the 8th Test player overall and 2nd South African after Graeme Smith to score a century in their 100th Test. After playing 100 Test matches he got the title (#Mighty hash).

In August 2017, he was named in a World XI team to play three Twenty20 International matches against Pakistan in the 2017 Independence Cup in Lahore.

=== 2019 Cricket World Cup and retirement ===
In April 2019, he was named in South Africa's squad for the 2019 Cricket World Cup. On 19 June 2019, in the match against New Zealand, Amla became the second-fastest batsman, in terms of innings, to score 8,000 runs in ODIs, doing so in his 176th innings.

On 8 August 2019, Amla announced his playing retirement from all forms of international cricket. After retiring from international cricket, he joined Cape Town Blitz franchise team as a batting consultant for the 2019 Mzansi Super League tournament.

Later in December, Amla headed one of the teams of Qatar T10 League, Falcon Hunters, as the leading international batsmen.

In January 2020, Pakistan Super League franchise Peshawar Zalmi signed Amla as team's batting mentor for the 2020 season.

== Coaching career ==
In August 2023, He was appointed as a batting coach of Johannesburg-based Lions for the period of three years. In 2023, he was also falsely attributed as stating that he sympathized with the Pakistani team during a game with South Africa. This misinformation was spread during a barrage of false information occurrences during 2023.

== Dean Jones controversy ==
During a Test match between South Africa and Sri Lanka on 7 August 2006, Australian TEN Sports commentator Dean Jones referred to Amla as a "terrorist" after he had taken a catch; after incorrectly assuming that broadcasting switched to a commercial break, he said, "The terrorist gets another wicket". The broadcast was aired around the world, including South Africa, and Jones was widely condemned by South African fans, players and several former cricketers and commentators, leading to the channel terminating its contract with Jones. After the incident, Jones reportedly apologized to Amla, stating that his comments were never "supposed to be heard over the air", which he accepted.

== International centuries ==
As of January 2019, Amla has scored 28 Test and 27 ODI centuries.

== See also ==
- List of cricketers by number of international centuries scored
