= Mitchell McClenaghan =

New Zealand cricketer (born 1986)

Personal information
- Full name: Mitchell John McClenaghan
- Born: 11 June 1986 (age 40); Hastings, Hawke's Bay, New Zealand
- Batting: Left-handed
- Bowling: Left-arm fast medium
- Role: Bowler

International information
- National side: New Zealand (2012–2018)
- ODI debut (cap 176): 19 January 2013 v South Africa
- Last ODI: 25 January 2016 v Pakistan
- ODI shirt no.: 81
- T20I debut (cap 57): 21 December 2012 v South Africa
- Last T20I: 31 May 2018 v West Indies
- T20I shirt no.: 81

Domestic team information
- Years: Team
- 2007/08–2010/11: Central Districts
- 2011/12–2019/20: Auckland
- 2013: Lancashire
- 2014: Worcestershire
- 2015–2019: Mumbai Indians (squad no. 81)
- 2015–2016: Middlesex
- 2017–2018: St Lucia Stars
- 2017/18: Sydney Thunder
- 2018–2019: Lahore Qalandars (squad no. 81)
- 2018/19: Nangarhar Leopards
- 2020: Karachi Kings (squad no. 81)
- 2020/21: Otago

Career statistics
Competition	ODI	T20I	FC	LA
Matches	48	29	38	103
Runs scored	108	24	444	323
Batting average	27.00	6.00	14.32	13.45
100s/50s	0/0	0/0	0/1	0/0
Top score	34*	10	73*	34*
Balls bowled	2,336	608	7,353	5,015
Wickets	82	30	117	190
Bowling average	28.20	26.30	37.26	25.10
5 wickets in innings	1	0	3	4
10 wickets in match	0	0	0	0
Best bowling	5/58	3/17	8/23	6/41
Catches/stumpings	4/–	7/–	8/–	14/–
Medal record
Men's Cricket
Representing New Zealand
ICC Cricket World Cup
Runner-up	2015 Australia and New Zealand
- Source: ESPNcricinfo, 18 June 2021

Mitchell John McClenaghan (born 11 June 1986) is a New Zealand former international cricketer who played One Day Internationals and Twenty20 Internationals for the national team. Domestically, he played for Central Districts, Auckland and Otago as a left-arm medium-fast bowler. He was also a part of the New Zealand squad to finish as runners-up at the 2015 Cricket World Cup.

== International career ==
McClenaghan made his international debut in a T20I against South Africa on 21 December 2012 when New Zealand toured the country. He took his maiden T20I wicket of South Africa's opener Richard Levi in the same match and finished with the figures of 1/20 from his three overs. He played in all three T20I matches of the series and took a total of 4 wickets in his maiden T20I series.

McClenaghan made his ODI debut in the same tour against South Africa on 19 January 2013. He finished the match with an excellent figures of 4-20 from his ten overs, the best bowling figures by a New Zealand debutant and becoming only the second New Zealander after Dayle Hadlee to take four wickets on ODI debut. He played in all three ODI's of the series, finishing with a total of 6 wickets to become the joint highest wicket-taker for New Zealand in that ODI series along with Kane Williamson who also took 6 wickets in the series.

In May 2013, McClenaghan was named in New Zealand's 15 man ODI squad for the 2013 Champions Trophy. He played in New Zealand's all three matches of the tournament and picked up a total of 11 wickets with a best bowling figures of 4-43 and ended the tournament as the second highest wicket-taker after Ravindra Jadeja who took 12 wickets in the tournament.

On 24 October 2014, against South Africa in the second ODI, McClenaghan became the fastest New Zealander and joint second fastest of all time to reach 50 ODI wickets in terms of matches. He achieved the feat in his 23rd ODI match with the wicket of Quinton de Kock.

=== Cricket World Cup 2015 ===
In January 2015, McClenaghan was named in New Zealand's 15 man ODI squad for the 2015 Cricket World Cup, but the depth of New Zealand's pace resources only allowed him one match during New Zealand's surge to the final. He played his only World Cup match against Bangladesh on 13 March 2015 where he returned figures of 0-68 from his 8 overs.

=== Twenty20 World Cup 2016 ===
In January 2016, McClenaghan was named in New Zealand's 15 man T20I squad for the 2016 Twenty World Cup. He played a total of 4 matches in the tournament and picked up a total of 4 wickets at an average of 21.75 with a best bowling figures of 3–17 against Australia.

=== Champions Trophy 2017 ===
In April 2017, McClenaghan was named in New Zealand's 15 man ODI squad for the 2017 Champions Trophy. But he didn't feature in New Zealand's any three matches of the tournament.

=== Giving up New Zealand contract ===
In August 2017, McClenaghan gave up New Zealand contract in order to pursue overseas T20 league career. He was eligible for selection for New Zealand whenever available in the future. He was replaced by Lockie Ferguson in New Zealand's central contract list.

=== World XI ===
In May 2018, McClenaghan was named in ICC’s World XI squad to face the West Indies in a one-off T20I at the Lord's. The T20I was granted international status by the ICC and was played to raise funds for two stadiums damaged by two hurricanes in September 2017 in the Caribbean and was named as Hurricane Relief T20 Challenge. McClenaghan played in the match and finished with the figures of 0-31 from his three overs. It was the last ever international match for McClenaghan till date.

== Domestic career ==
In 2009, in a non-first-class match, McClenaghan took 5/36 against the England Lions for New Zealand Emerging Players.

It was announced on 14 June 2013 that McClenaghan would be joining Lancashire as an overseas player for their Friends Life t20 campaign. He was awarded the Player of the Match award in his first home match at Old Trafford against Nottinghamshire after taking five wickets for just 29 runs.

On 19 May 2015, McClenaghan joined Middlesex as an overseas player for their final six T20 Blast group matches, replacing South African Kyle Abbott from the end of June 2015. He made his debut against Sussex at Lord's on 2 July 2015 and took eight wickets in four appearances, including 3/24 on his debut.

McClenaghan was the leading wicket-taker for Auckland in the 2018–19 Ford Trophy, with fifteen dismissals in nine matches.

=== T20 franchise career ===
McClenaghan made his Indian Premier League debut in 2015, when he was bought by Mumbai Indians and took 14 wickets at a bowling average of 22.50 runs per wicket in 10 appearances. He played with the franchise in the 2016 and 2017 editions. After going unsold in the 2018 auction, McClenaghan was selected by the Mumbai Indians as a replacement for the injured Jason Behrendorff.

In September 2018, McClenaghan was named in Nangarhar's squad in the first edition of the Afghanistan Premier League tournament.

In September 2022, he was selected to play for the Gujarat Giants franchise team in the 2022 Legends League Cricket. And In 2023 he was selected by Manipal Tigers.

== Coaching career ==
In October 2026, Mumbai Indians announced McClenaghan had been appointed as the team's bowling coach.

== Records and achievements ==
- Best bowling figures by a New Zealand ODI debutant (4-20).
- Only the second New Zealander after Dayle Hadlee to take four wickets on ODI debut.
- Second highest wicket-taker in the 2013 Champions Trophy (11).
- Fastest New Zealander and joint second fastest of all time to reach 50 ODI wickets in terms of matches (23).
