= World XI (cricket) =

ICC World XI
International Cricket Council
- ICC status: None (None)
- ICC region: Global

International cricket
- First international: 17–23 June 1970 vs. England at Lord's, London

ICC World XI, World XI, Rest of the World, or similar names, may refer to the following cricket teams:

Annual all-star selections

- ICC Test Team of the Year, since 2004
- ICC ODI Team of the Year, also since 2004

Teams that played matches

- Rest of the World cricket team in England in 1970, and briefer tours occurring in the 1960s, including in 1966 and 1967
- Rest of the World cricket team in Australia in 1971–72
- World Series Cricket World XI, competed in World Series Cricket 1978–79
- Sport Aid 1986 team v. West Indies
- Victorian Cricket Association centenary ODI v. Australia in 1995–96
- World Cricket Tsunami Appeal 2005 ODI v. Asia XI; also unofficial teams in ODIs v. New Zealand, MCC, and Asia XI
- 2005 ICC Super Series, World XI played 3 ODIs and one Test against Australia
- 2017 Independence Cup, a T20I series in Pakistan
- Hurricane Relief T20 Challenge, a one-off T20I match in England
- Mujib 100 T20 Cup Bangladesh 2020, two matches against an Asia XI team

Wisden All-Time World Test XI

Wisden All-Time World Test XI

== See also ==
- List of World XI Test cricketers
- List of World XI ODI cricketers
- List of World XI Twenty20 International cricketers
- Category:Multi-national teams in international cricket
