= List of African XI ODI cricketers =

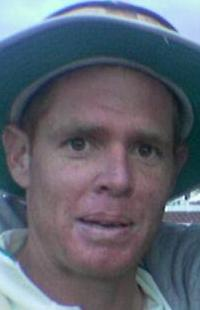
Shaun Pollock, top run scorer in the history of the Afro-Asia Cup

A One Day International, or an ODI, is an international cricket match between two representative teams, each having ODI status, as determined by the International Cricket Council. An ODI differs from Test matches in that the number of overs per team is limited, and that each team has only one innings.

Designed as a fund-raiser for the African Cricket Association and the Asian Cricket Council, the Afro-Asia Cup debuted in 2005 and a second series was played in 2007. The list is arranged in the order in which each player won his first ODI cap for the African XI. Where more than one player won his first ODI cap in the same match, those players are listed alphabetically by surname. All the players have represented their respective member teams of the ICC at either Test or ODI level, but only the records of their games for the ACA African XI are listed.

The rules of ODIs have changed since the first Afro-Asia Cup. During the tournament, the ICC experimented with a rule called supersub – where the twelfth man would be allowed to take to the field in the place of one of the players and would be allowed to bat and/or bowl in his place, gaining a full cap in the process. As a result, this meant there were generally 12 capped players per match instead of the regular 11 – even though a player may have not participated in either batting or bowling in a match. For example, Monde Zondeki bowled for Africa XI during the second match, but was substituted for Steve Tikolo during the innings break and Tikolo went on to bat in his place instead; both players are listed as receiving a cap for this match. These rules were not in place for the 2007 Afro-Asia Cup.

Of the six matches to have been played to date, the ACA African XI has only won one match: the inaugural match at Centurion. However, they went on to lose the next ODI, and the final match of the 2005 competition was called off due to rain, leading to the trophy was shared.

In the 2007 competition, the African XI suffered a 3–0 whitewash, losing the first two matches by 34 and 31 runs respectively. Despite half-centuries from AB de Villiers, Justin Kemp and Shaun Pollock in the final ODI they went on to lose by 13 runs.

Shaun Pollock was the first player to score a century in the competition, during the first ODI of the 2007 competition, which led to him being named Man of the Match. He also has the most runs to his name between both African XI and Asian XI players.

Morné Morkel has the highest number of wickets for the African XI with 8, all captured during the 2007 series, and the second most wickets in the Afro-Asia Cup's history.

Statistics are correct as of June 10, following the conclusion of the 2007 series.

== Cricketers ==
African XI ODI cricketers						Batting				Bowling			
Cap	Name	Nationality	Debut	Last match	Mat	Runs	HS	Avg	50 / 100	Wkt	Best	Avg	4I/5I
1	Nicky Boje	South Africa	v Asia XI; August 17, 2005	v Asia XI; August 20, 2005	2	4	3	2.00	0/0	1	1/40	64.00	0/0
2	Mark Boucher	South Africa	v Asia XI; August 17, 2005	v Asia XI; June 10, 2007	5	163	73	32.60	1/0	–	–	–	–/–
3	AB de Villiers	South Africa	v Asia XI; August 17, 2005	v Asia XI; June 10, 2007	5	150	70	30.00	1/0	0	0/22	–	0/0
4	Boeta Dippenaar	South Africa	v Asia XI; August 17, 2005	v Asia XI; June 10, 2007	6	121	67	20.16	1/0	–	–	–	–/–
5	Jacques Kallis	South Africa	v Asia XI; August 17, 2005	v Asia XI; August 21, 2005	2	8	4	4.00	0/0	3	3/42	14.00	0/0
6	Justin Kemp	South Africa	v Asia XI; August 17, 2005	v Asia XI; June 10, 2007	6	141	86	23.50	1/0	3	2/40	33.33	0/0
7	Thomas Odoyo	Kenya	v Asia XI; August 17, 2005	v Asia XI; June 9, 2007	5	54	39	54.00	0/0	4	3/45	39.25	0/0
8	Justin Ontong	South Africa	v Asia XI; August 17, 2005	v Asia XI; August 17, 2005	1	0	0	0.00	0/0	–	–	–	–/–
9	Shaun Pollock	South Africa	v Asia XI; August 17, 2005	v Asia XI; June 10, 2007	6	298	130	74.50	1/1	4	3/32	18.50	0/0
10	Ashwell Prince	South Africa	v Asia XI; August 17, 2005	v Asia XI; August 21, 2005	3	78	78*	39.00	1/0	–	–	–	–/–
11	Dale Steyn	South Africa	v Asia XI; August 17, 2005	v Asia XI; August 21, 2005	2	4	3	2.00	0/0	2	1/2	21.00	0/0
12	Steve Tikolo	Kenya	v Asia XI; August 17, 2005	v Asia XI; June 10, 2007	4	59	43	14.75	0/0	1	1/49	108.00	0/0
13	Jacques Rudolph	South Africa	v Asia XI; August 20, 2005	v Asia XI; August 21, 2005	2	17	10	8.50	0/0	–	–	–	–/–
14	Heath Streak	Zimbabwe	v Asia XI; August 20, 2005	v Asia XI; August 21, 2005	2	42	28	21.00	0/0	2	2/64	32.00	0/0
15	Monde Zondeki	South Africa	v Asia XI; August 20, 2005	v Asia XI; August 21, 2005	2	0	0	0.00	0/0	0	0/64	–	0/0
16	Graeme Smith	South Africa	v Asia XI; August 21, 2005	v Asia XI; August 21, 2005	1	0	0	0.00	0/0	–	–	–	–/–
17	Tatenda Taibu	Zimbabwe	v Asia XI; August 21, 2005	v Asia XI; August 21, 2005	1	10	10	10.00	0/0	–	–	–	–/–
18	Loots Bosman	South Africa	v Asia XI; June 6, 2007	v Asia XI; June 6, 2007	1	2	2	2.00	0/0	–	–	–	–/–
19	Elton Chigumbura	Zimbabwe	v Asia XI; June 6, 2007	v Asia XI; June 10, 2007	3	51	40	17.00	0/0	6	2/56	36.16	0/0
20	Albie Morkel	South Africa	v Asia XI; June 6, 2007	v Asia XI; June 9, 2007	2	22	13	11.00	0/0	3	2/64	37.66	0/0
21	Morné Morkel	South Africa	v Asia XI; June 6, 2007	v Asia XI; June 10, 2007	3	29	25	29.00	0/0	8	3/50	20.75	0/0
22	Johan Botha	South Africa	v Asia XI; June 9, 2007	v Asia XI; June 10, 2007	2	31	18*	31.00	0/0	0	0/49	–	0/0
23	Vusimuzi Sibanda	Zimbabwe	v Asia XI; June 9, 2007	v Asia XI; June 10, 2007	2	80	45	40.00	0/0	0	0/24	–	0/0
24	Peter Ongondo	Kenya	v Asia XI; June 10, 2007	v Asia XI; June 10, 2007	1	–	–	–	-/-	3	3/35	11.66	0/0

== See also ==
- 2005 Afro-Asia Cup
- 2007 Afro-Asia Cup
