= List of international cricket five-wicket hauls by Dale Steyn =

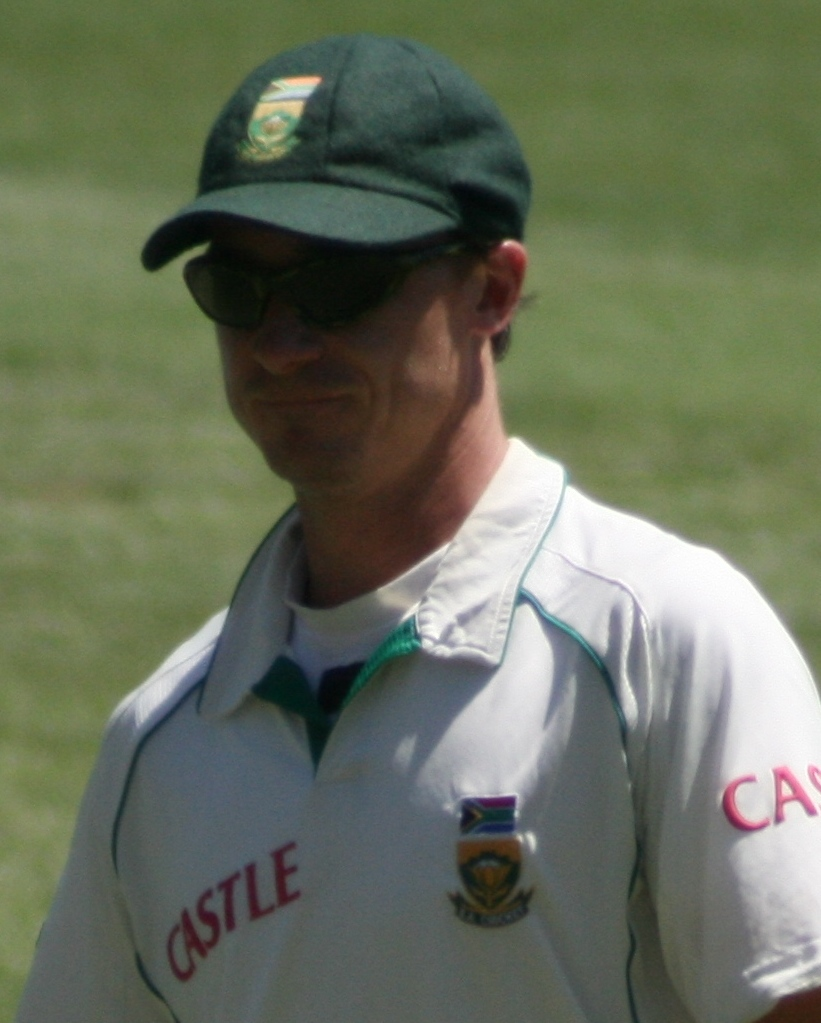
Steyn has taken 26 five-wicket hauls in Test cricket.

Dale Steyn, a South African cricketer, has taken 29 five-wicket hauls in international cricket. In cricket, a five-wicket haul (also known as a "five–for" or "fifer") refers to a bowler taking five or more wickets in a single innings. This is regarded as a notable achievement, and as of October 2024, only 54 bowlers have taken 15 or more five-wicket hauls at international level in their cricketing careers. A right-arm fast bowler, Steyn reached 300 Test wickets in fewer matches than any other South African bowler. He was named the ICC's Test Player of the Year in 2008, and the Wisden Cricketers' Almanack named him one of their cricketers of the year in 2013.

Steyn made his Test debut in 2004 against England at the St George's Oval, Port Elizabeth. His first Test five-wicket haul came in 2006, against New Zealand at the SuperSport Park, Centurion. In November 2007 against the same team at the Wanderers Stadium, Johannesburg, he took a five-wicket haul in both innings of a Test match for the first time. He has repeated this feat twice more: against Australia at the Melbourne Cricket Ground in 2008, and Pakistan at the Wanderers Stadium in 2013. Steyn's career-best figures for an innings are 7 wickets for 51 runs against India at the Vidarbha Cricket Association Stadium, Nagpur, in February 2010. He has taken ten or more wickets in a match on five occasions. As of 2015, he has taken the most number five-wicket hauls for South Africa.

Steyn made his One Day International (ODI) debut for the African XI in the first match of the 2005 Afro-Asia Cup, against the Asian XI at the SuperSport Park, Centurion. His first ODI five-wicket haul came during the 2011 Cricket World Cup, against India, a match which South Africa won at the Vidarbha Cricket Association Stadium. His career-best bowling in ODI cricket is 6 wickets for 39 runs against Pakistan at the St George's Park, Port Elizabeth, in November 2013.

Making his first Twenty20 International (T20I) appearance in 2006, Steyn has yet to take a five-wicket haul in the format. His best performance in T20I is 4 wickets for 9 runs, against the West Indies at the St George's Oval, in December 2007. As of 2015, he is joint eighth—with Harbhajan Singh—overall among all-time combined five-wicket haul takers.

== Key ==
Symbol	Meaning
Date	Day the Test started or ODI held
Inn	The innings of the match in which the five-wicket haul was taken
Overs	Number of overs bowled in that innings
Runs	Runs conceded
Wkts	Number of wickets taken
Econ	Runs conceded per over
Batsmen	The batsmen whose wickets were taken in the five-wicket haul
Result	Result for the South Africa team
*	One of two five-wicket hauls by Steyn in a match
†	10 wickets or more taken in the match
‡	Steyn was selected as man of the match

== Tests ==
Five-wicket hauls in Test cricket by Dale Steyn
No.	Date	Ground	Against	Inn	Overs	Runs	Wkts	Econ	Batsmen	Result
1	15 April 2006	SuperSport Park, Centurion	New Zealand	4	17	47	5	2.76	Stephen Fleming; Scott Styris; Brendon McCullum; Daniel Vettori; Chris Martin	Won
2	6 August 2006	P Saravanamuttu Stadium, Colombo	Sri Lanka	2	13.1	82	5	6.22	Mahela Jayawardene; Prasanna Jayawardene; Farveez Maharoof; Chaminda Vaas; Muttiah Muralitharan	Lost
3	1 October 2007	National Stadium, Karachi	Pakistan	4	15	56	5	3.73	Mohammad Hafeez; Salman Butt; Younus Khan; Abdur Rehman; Umar Gul	Won
4	8 November 2007 * † ‡	Wanderers Stadium, Johannesburg	New Zealand	2	14.3	34	5	2.34	Craig Cumming; Shane Bond; Jacob Oram; Brendon McCullum; Chris Martin	Won
5	8 November 2007 * † ‡	Wanderers Stadium, Johannesburg	New Zealand	4	17	59	5	3.47	Craig Cumming; Scott Styris; Brendon McCullum; Iain O'Brien; Chris Martin	Won
6	16 November 2007 † ‡	SuperSport Park, Centurion	New Zealand	4	10.3	49	6	4.66	Lou Vincent; Michael Papps; Stephen Fleming; Brendon McCullum; Mark Gillespie; Iain O'Brien	Won
7	11 January 2008	Kingsmead Cricket Ground, Durban	West Indies	3	21.5	72	6	3.29	Brenton Parchment; Marlon Samuels; Dwayne Bravo; Darren Sammy; Daren Powell; Fidel Edwards	Won
8	3 April 2008	Sardar Patel Stadium, Ahmedabad	India	1	8	23	5	2.87	Virender Sehwag; Rahul Dravid; Harbhajan Singh; R. P. Singh; S. Sreesanth	Won
9	19 November 2008	OUTsurance Oval, Bloemfontein	Bangladesh	3	18	63	5	3.50	Imrul Kayes; Shakib Al Hasan; Naeem Islam; Mashrafe Mortaza; Shahadat Hossain	Won
10	26 December 2008 * † ‡	Melbourne Cricket Ground, Melbourne	Australia	1	29	87	5	3.00	Simon Katich; Michael Hussey; Brett Lee; Mitchell Johnson; Nathan Hauritz	Won
11	26 December 2008 * † ‡	Melbourne Cricket Ground, Melbourne	Australia	3	20.2	67	5	3.29	Matthew Hayden; Simon Katich; Michael Clarke; Andrew Symonds; Peter Siddle	Won
12	14 January 2010	Wanderers Stadium, Johannesburg	England	1	13.5	51	5	3.68	Andrew Strauss; Ian Bell; Matt Prior; Graeme Swann; Ryan Sidebottom	Won
13	6 February 2010 †	Vidarbha Cricket Association Stadium, Nagpur	India	2	16.4	51	7	3.06	Murali Vijay; Sachin Tendulkar; Subramaniam Badrinath; Wriddhiman Saha; Harbhajan Singh; Zaheer Khan; Amit Mishra	Won
14	10 June 2010 ‡	Queen's Park Oval, Port of Spain	West Indies	2	14	29	5	2.07	Shivnarine Chanderpaul; Narsingh Deonarine; Shane Shillingford; Sulieman Benn; Nelon Pascal	Won
15	26 December 2010	Kingsmead Cricket Ground, Durban	India	1	19	50	6	2.63	Virender Sehwag; Murali Vijay; Rahul Dravid; VVS Laxman; Mahendra Singh Dhoni; Harbhajan Singh	Lost
16	2 January 2011	Newlands Cricket Ground, Cape Town	India	2	31	75	5	2.41	Virender Sehwag; Cheteshwar Pujara; MS Dhoni; Harbhajan Singh; Ishant Sharma	Drawn
17	26 December 2011	Kingsmead Cricket Ground, Durban	Sri Lanka	3	20	73	5	3.65	Tillakaratne Dilshan; Angelo Mathews; Dinesh Chandimal; Thisara Perera; Chanaka Welegedara	Lost
18	19 July 2012	Kennington Oval, London	England	3	21	56	5	2.66	Jonathan Trott; Ian Bell; Ravi Bopara; Stuart Broad; Graeme Swann	Won
19	11 January 2013 ‡	St George's Oval, Port Elizabeth	New Zealand	2	13	17	5	1.30	Martin Guptill; Kane Williamson; Doug Bracewell; Neil Wagner; Jeetan Patel	Won
20	1 February 2013 * † ‡	Wanderers Stadium, Johannesburg	Pakistan	2	8.1	8	6	0.97	Mohammad Hafeez; Nasir Jamshed; Younus Khan; Sarfraz Ahmed; Saeed Ajmal; Rahat Ali	Won
21	1 February 2013 * † ‡	Wanderers Stadium, Johannesburg	Pakistan	4	28.4	52	5	1.81	Nasir Jamshed; Misbah-ul-Haq; Asad Shafiq; Umar Gul; Junaid Khan	Won
22	26 December 2013 ‡	Kingsmead Cricket Ground, Durban	India	1	30	100	6	3.33	Murali Vijay; Cheteshwar Pujara; Rohit Sharma; MS Dhoni; Zaheer Khan; Ishant Sharma	Won
23	18 July 2014 ‡	Galle International Stadium, Galle	Sri Lanka	2	24	54	5	2.30	align=center: Kaushal Silva; Mahela Jayawardhane; Lahiru Thirimanne; Dinesh Chandimal; Dilruwan Perera	Won
24	9 August 2014	Harare Sports Club, Harare	Zimbabwe	1	22.4	46	5	2.02	Vusi Sibanda; Sean Williams; Richmond Mutumbami; Tendai Chatara; John Nyumbu	Won
25	17 December 2014	SuperSport Park, Centurion	West Indies	2	8.2	34	6	4.08	Leon Johnson; Marlon Samuels; Shivnarine Chanderpaul; Denesh Ramdin; Jerome Taylor; Sheldon Cottrell	Won
26	30 August 2016	SuperSport Park, Centurion	New Zealand	4	16.2	33	5	2.02	Tom Latham; Martin Guptill; Ross Taylor; Henry Nicholls; Mitchell Santner	Won

== One Day Internationals ==
Five-wicket haul in One Day Internationals by Dale Steyn
No.	Date	Ground	Against	Inn	Overs	Runs	Wkts	Econ	Batsmen	Result
1	12 March 2011 ‡	Vidarbha Cricket Association Stadium, Nagpur	India	1	9.4	50	5	5.17	Gautam Gambhir; Yusuf Pathan; Harbhajan Singh; Ashish Nehra; Munaf Patel	Won
2	8 November 2013 ‡	Sheikh Zayed Cricket Stadium, Abu Dhabi	Pakistan	2	10	25	5	2.50	Sohaib Maqsood; Misbah-ul-Haq; Sohail Tanvir; Umar Akmal; Saeed Ajmal	Won
3	27 November 2013	St George's Park, Port Elizabeth	Pakistan	1	9	39	6	4.33	Nasir Jamshed; Mohammad Hafeez; Umar Akmal; Shahid Afridi; Bilawal Bhatti; Saeed Ajmal	Lost
