= List of cricketers who have played 200 One Day International matches =

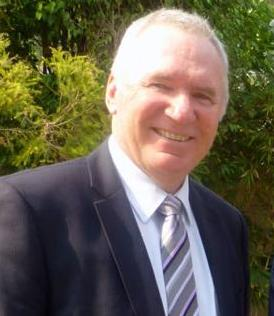
Allan Border of Australia was the first player to play 200 ODIs.

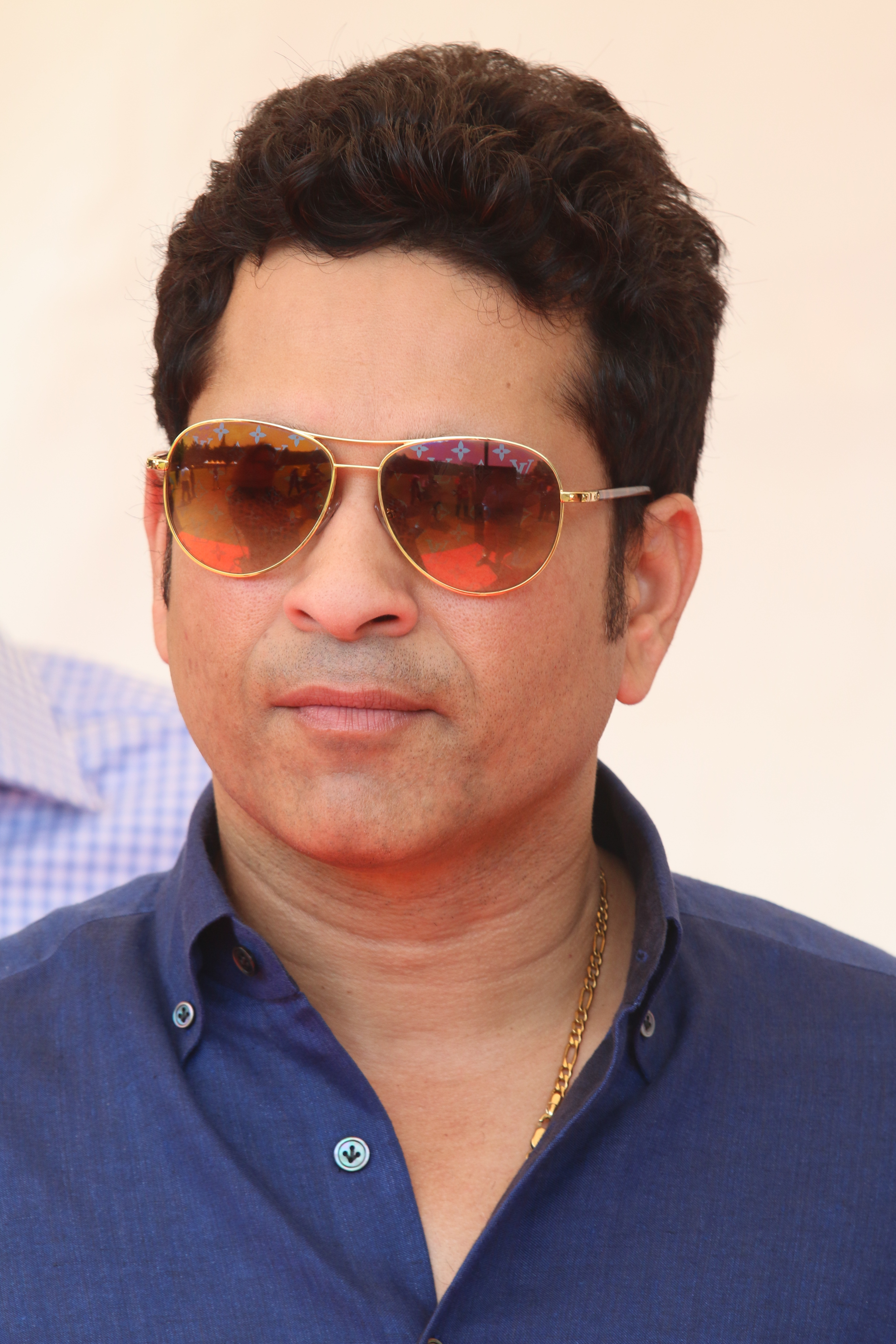
Sachin Tendulkar of India has played the most matches (463).

One Day International (ODI) cricket is played between international cricket teams who are Full Members of the International Cricket Council (ICC) as well as the top four Associate members. Unlike Test matches, ODIs consist of one inning per team, having a limit in the number of overs, currently 50 overs per innings – although in the past this has been 55 or 60 overs. ODI matches are a subset of List A cricket and so records and statistics are recorded both for specifically for ODIs and within List A. The earliest match recognized as an ODI was played between England and Australia in January 1971; since when there have been over 4,000 ODIs played by 28 teams. The frequency of matches has steadily increased, partly because of the increase in the number of ODI playing countries, and partly as the cricket boards of those nations seek to maximize their revenue with the increased popularity of cricket, a process that dates from the time of the Packer Revolution. In ODIs playing 200 matches is considered to be a significant achievement. Allan Border of Australia was the first cricketer to have reached this landmark.

Sachin Tendulkar of India has played in most ODIs, having represented India in 463 matches.

As of September 2026, 87 cricketers have reached this landmark, including 16 from India, the most among all ODI playing nations.

== Players with 200+ ODI matches ==
Following is the list of cricketers who have played 200 or more ODI matches.

List of cricketers who have played 200 ODIs
No.	Player	Date	Team(s)	Total matches	Ref.
1	Allan Border	20 February 1990	Australia	273	
2	Desmond Haynes	18 March 1992	West Indies	238	
3	Javed Miandad	12 December 1992	Pakistan	233	
4	Kapil Dev	26 February 1993	India	225	
5	Richie Richardson	2 March 1994	West Indies	224	
6	Saleem Malik	2 December 1994	Pakistan	283	
7	Mohammad Azharuddin	29 November 1995	India	334	
8	Wasim Akram	31 August 1996	Pakistan	356	
9	Steve Waugh	7 September 1996	Australia	325	
10	Arjuna Ranatunga	12 November 1996	Sri Lanka	269	
11	Aravinda de Silva	3 April 1997	Sri Lanka	308	
12	Ijaz Ahmed	9 April 1998	Pakistan	250	
13	Sachin Tendulkar	30 September 1998	India	463	
14	Roshan Mahanama	9 November 1998	Sri Lanka	213	
15	Courtney Walsh	16 September 1999	West Indies	205	
16	Inzamam-ul-Haq	22 October 1999	Pakistan / Asia XI	378	
17	Mark Waugh	12 January 2000	Australia	244	
18	Sanath Jayasuriya	16 February 2000	Sri Lanka / Asia XI	445	
19	Saeed Anwar	19 February 2000	Pakistan	247	
20	Anil Kumble	27 March 2000	India / Asia XI	271	
21	Waqar Younis	17 February 2001	Pakistan	262	
22	Jonty Rhodes	16 May 2001	South Africa	245	
23	Carl Hooper	15 December 2001	West Indies	227	
24	Javagal Srinath	22 January 2002	India	229	
25	Chris Harris	16 February 2002	New Zealand	250	
26	Brian Lara	12 June 2002	West Indies / ICC World XI	299	
27	Sourav Ganguly	11 July 2002	India / Asia XI	311	
28	Muttiah Muralitharan	30 September 2002	Sri Lanka / ICC World XI / Asia XI	350	
29	Andy Flower	27 November 2002	Zimbabwe	213	
30	Chaminda Vaas	1 December 2002	Sri Lanka / Asia XI	322	
31	Rahul Dravid	23 February 2003	India / ICC World XI / Asia XI	344	
32	Michael Bevan	27 February 2003	Australia	232	
33	Grant Flower	3 April 2003	Zimbabwe	221	
34	Hashan Tillakaratne	7 April 2003	Sri Lanka	200	
35	Stephen Fleming	19 May 2003	New Zealand / ICC World XI	280	
36	Marvan Atapattu	11 June 2003	Sri Lanka	268	
37	Shaun Pollock	5 October 2003	South Africa / ICC World XI / Africa XI	303	
38	Moin Khan	17 January 2004	Pakistan	219	
39	Ricky Ponting	27 May 2004	Australia / ICC World XI	375	
40	Jacques Kallis	28 August 2004	South Africa / ICC World XI / Africa XI	328	
41	Adam Gilchrist	14 January 2005	Australia / ICC World XI	287	
42	Glenn McGrath	4 February 2005	Australia / ICC World XI	250	
43	Chris Cairns	19 February 2005	New Zealand / ICC World XI	215	
44	Shahid Afridi	2 April 2005	Pakistan / ICC World XI / Asia XI	398	
45	Mohammad Yousuf	17 August 2005	Pakistan / Asia XI	288	
46	Nathan Astle	4 November 2005	New Zealand	223	
47	Mark Boucher	6 November 2005	South Africa / Africa XI	295	
48	Abdul Razzaq	19 December 2005	Pakistan / Asia XI	265	
49	Mahela Jayawardene	24 January 2006	Sri Lanka / Asia XI	448	
50	Damien Martyn	12 March 2006	Australia	208	
51	Shivnarine Chanderpaul	26 October 2006	West Indies	268	
52	Herschelle Gibbs	20 March 2007	South Africa	248	
53	Daniel Vettori	20 April 2007	New Zealand / ICC World XI	295	
54	Kumar Sangakkara	28 April 2007	Sri Lanka / ICC World XI / Asia XI	404	
55	Yuvraj Singh	19 February 2008	India / Asia XI	304	
56	Virender Sehwag	8 February 2009	India / ICC World XI / Asia XI	251	
57	Chris Gayle	24 May 2009	West Indies / ICC World XI	301	
58	Harbhajan Singh	5 November 2009	India / Asia XI	236	
59	Younis Khan	26 January 2010	Pakistan	265	
60	Tillakaratne Dilshan	18 March 2011	Sri Lanka	330	
61	Brett Lee	9 April 2011	Australia	221	
62	Michael Clarke	14 August 2011	Australia	245	
63	Shoaib Malik	6 December 2011	Pakistan	287	
64	MS Dhoni	14 February 2012	India / Asia XI	350	
65	Brendon McCullum	29 February 2012	New Zealand	260	
66	Zaheer Khan	4 August 2012	India / Asia XI	200	
67	Suresh Raina	2 November 2014	India	226	
68	AB de Villiers	14 February 2016	South Africa / Africa XI	228	
69	Elton Chigumbura	11 June 2016	Zimbabwe / Africa XI	213	
70	Upul Tharanga	28 March 2017	Sri Lanka / Asia XI	235	
71	Lasith Malinga	20 August 2017	Sri Lanka	226	
72	Virat Kohli †	22 October 2017	India	316	
73	Ross Taylor	16 January 2018	New Zealand	236	
74	Mohammad Hafeez	19 January 2018	Pakistan	218	
75	Eoin Morgan	10 March 2018	Ireland / England	248	
76	Angelo Mathews †	8 August 2018	Sri Lanka	226	
77	Hamilton Masakadza	3 October 2018	Zimbabwe	209	
78	Marlon Samuels	21 October 2018	West Indies	207	
79	Mashrafe Mortaza	9 December 2018	Bangladesh / Asia XI	220	
80	Rohit Sharma †	31 January 2019	India	290	
81	Mushfiqur Rahim	16 February 2019	Bangladesh	274	
82	Shakib Al Hasan	5 June 2019	Bangladesh	247	
83	Tamim Iqbal	2 July 2019	Bangladesh	243	
84	Brendan Taylor †	16 July 2021	Zimbabwe	208	
85	Mahmudullah	20 July 2021	Bangladesh	239	
86	Ravindra Jadeja †	20 February 2025	India	212	
87	Jos Buttler	14 July 2026	England	204	[93]
Last updated: 30 September 2026

† Still playing

== By team ==
200 or more ODIs by country
Teams	#Players
India	16
Pakistan	14
Sri Lanka	14
Australia	10
West Indies	8
New Zealand	7
South Africa	6
Zimbabwe	5
Bangladesh	5
England	2
Total	87
