= List of Asian XI ODI cricketers =

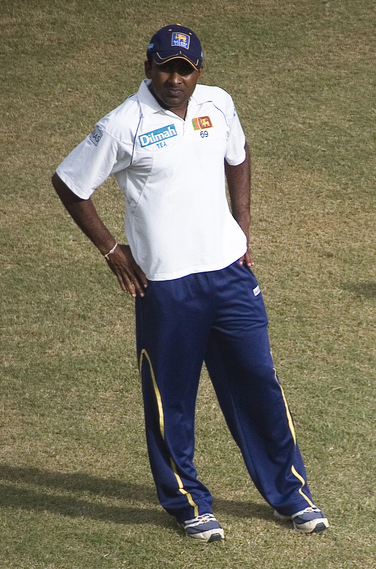
Sri Lankan Mahela Jayawardene holds the record for the most runs for the Asian XI

A One Day International, or an ODI, is an international cricket match between two representative teams, each having ODI status, as determined by the International Cricket Council. An ODI differs from Test matches in that the number of overs per team is limited, and that each team has only one innings.

The ACC Asian XI was a team named for the 2005 World Cricket Tsunami Appeal, a one-off match designed to raise funds for charities following the 2004 Indian Ocean earthquake and resulting tsunami. It also competed in two Afro-Asia Cup series against an African XI, which was designed as a fund-raiser for the African Cricket Association and the Asian Cricket Council. The Afro-Asian Cup debuted in 2005 and the second tournament was played in 2007.

The rules of ODIs have changed since the first Afro-Asia Cup. During the tournament, the ICC experimented with a rule called supersub – where the twelfth man would be allowed to take to the field in the place of one of the players and would be allowed to bat and/or bowl in his place, gaining a full cap in the process. As a result, this meant there were generally 12 capped players per match instead of the regular 11, even though a player may have not participated in either batting or bowling in a match. For example, Muttiah Muralitharan bowled during the first innings of the first ODI, but was replaced by Mohammad Ashraful who batted in his place: both players are listed as having a full cap. These rules were not in place for the World Cricket Tsunami Appeal match or the 2007 Afro-Asia Cup.

Of their 7 matches played, the Asian XI have won 4 of them. Their first match resulted in a heavy 112 run loss to the World XI in the Tsunami Appeal match, and they went on to lose the opening match of the 2005 Afro-Asian Cup by two runs to the African XI. They bounced back and won the next match, however, including half centuries for each of the Sri Lankan pair Kumar Sangakkara and Mahela Jayawardene. During the deciding match, the Asian XI bowled the African XI out for 106, but soon after starting their batting performance rain fell and the game was called off: the trophy was shared.

In the 2007 competition, the Asian XI recorded a 3–0 whitewash of the Africans – winning the first two matches by 34 and 31 runs, respectively, the latter helped by Dilhara Fernando recording ODI career best bowling figures of 4/36. In the final match, the Asians fell to 72/5, but following centuries from Mahela Jayawardene (107) and Mahendra Singh Dhoni (139*) – the latter being the highest individual score ever recorded in an Afro-Asia Cup match – they posted a score of 331/8. Despite half-centuries from three of the African batsmen, however, the Asian XI won by 13 runs.

Mahela Jayawardene is the highest run-scorer of the Asian XI in the Afro-Asia Cup, with two half-centuries and a century to his name, second to Shaun Pollock, and was named Man of the Series for the 2007 competition. Zaheer Khan tops the list for most wickets with 11.

The list is arranged in the order in which each player won his first ODI cap for the Asian XI (as opposed to their national team). Where more than one player won his first ODI cap in the same match, those players are listed alphabetically by their last name. (Note: Sorting as such may actually be considered incorrect, especially for players such as Abdul Razzaq or Mohammad Yousuf, where their last name is used in a different manner to that of western names; but are listed as such for continuity with other lists and ease of understanding the page.) All players have represented their respective member teams of the ICC, but only the records of their games for the ACC Asian XI are given.

== Cricketers ==
Statistics are correct as of July 8, 2007, following the conclusion of the 2007 Afro-Asia Cup.

Asian XI ODI cricketers						Batting				Bowling				Source
Cap	Name	Nationality	Debut	Last match (Note: Where a player has retired, their final match is listed.)	Mat (Note: Matches played.)	Runs	HS (Note: Highest score. An asterisk (*) signifies that the batsman was not out.)	Avg	50 / 100 (Note: Half centuries and centuries made. Note: A century made is not listed as an additional half century; ie, Shaun Pollock has made one half-century and one century and so is listed as 1/1, not 2/1.)	Wkt	Best	Avg	4W / 5W (Note: 4 and 5 wickets in one innings, respectively.)	Source
1	Rahul Dravid	India	v World XI; January 10, 2005	v World XI; January 10, 2005	1	75	75*	–	1/0	–	–	–	–/–	
2	Sourav Ganguly	India	v World XI; January 10, 2005	v Africa XI; June 9, 2007	3	142	88	47.33	1/0	0	0/14	–	0/0	
3	Sanath Jayasuriya	Sri Lanka	v World XI; January 10, 2005	v Africa XI; June 10, 2007	4	66	28	16.50	0/0	3	3/53	44.66	0/0	
4	Zaheer Khan	India	v World XI; January 10, 2005	v Africa XI; June 9, 2007	6	39	20*	39.00	0/0	13	3/21	15.30	0/0	
5	Anil Kumble	India	v World XI; January 10, 2005	v Africa XI; August 17, 2005	2	35	24	17.50	0/0	3	2/73	37.33	0/0	
6	Muttiah Muralitharan	Sri Lanka	v World XI; January 10, 2005	v Africa XI; August 21, 2005	4	0	0	0.00	0/0	6	3/59	23.00	0/0	
7	Abdul Razzaq	Pakistan	v World XI; January 10, 2005	v Africa XI; August 21, 2005	4	49	38	16.33	0/0	1	1/18	112.00	0/0	
8	Kumar Sangakkara	Sri Lanka	v World XI; January 10, 2005	v Africa XI; August 21, 2005	4	121	61	40.33	1/0	–	–	–	–/–	
9	Virender Sehwag	India	v World XI; January 10, 2005	v Africa XI; June 10, 2007	7	214	52	30.57	1/0	1	1/37	83.00	0/0	
10	Chaminda Vaas	Sri Lanka	v World XI; January 10, 2005	v World XI; January 10, 2005	1	7	7	7.00	0/0	1	1/59	59.00	0/0	
11	Mohammad Yousuf (Note: Mohammad Yousuf made his debut for the Asian XI before changing his name from Yousuf Youhana; but has appeared for the team under his new name. Records under each name are combined.)	Pakistan	v World XI; January 10, 2005	v Africa XI; June 10, 2007	7	166	66	27.66	2/0	–	–	–	–/–	
12	Shahid Afridi	Pakistan	v Africa XI; August 17, 2005	v Africa XI; August 21, 2005	3	19	13	6.33	0/0	2	1/5	30.00	0/0	
13	Shoaib Akhtar	Pakistan	v Africa XI; August 17, 2005	v Africa XI; August 21, 2005	3	21	15	10.50	0/0	6	2/16	17.66	0/0	
14	Mohammad Ashraful	Bangladesh	v Africa XI; August 17, 2005	v Africa XI; August 21, 2005	2	0	0	0.00	0/0	–	–	–	–/–	
15	Inzamam-ul-Haq	Pakistan	v Africa XI; August 17, 2005	v Africa XI; August 21, 2005	3	38	32*	38.00	0/0	–	–	–	–/–	
16	Ashish Nehra	India	v Africa XI; August 17, 2005	v Africa XI; August 21, 2005	3	1	1	1.00	0/0	2	1/19	41.00	0/0	
17	Mahela Jayawardene	Sri Lanka	v Africa XI; August 20, 2005	v Africa XI; June 10, 2007	5	269	107	67.25	2/1	0	0/19	–	0/0	
18	Mohammad Asif	Pakistan	v Africa XI; June 6, 2007	v Africa XI; June 10, 2007	3	–	–	–	–/–	5	3/57	40.20	0/0	
19	Mahendra Singh Dhoni	India	v Africa XI; June 6, 2007	v Africa XI; June 10, 2007	3	174	139*	87.00	0/1	–	–	–	–/–	
20	Mashrafe Mortaza	Bangladesh	v Africa XI; June 6, 2007	v Africa XI; June 10, 2007	2	14	13	7.00	0/0	1	1/57	108.00	0/0	
21	Harbhajan Singh	India	v Africa XI; June 6, 2007	v Africa XI; June 10, 2007	2	24	20	12.00	0/0	4	3/48	25.25	0/0	
22	Yuvraj Singh	India	v Africa XI; June 6, 2007	v Africa XI; June 10, 2007	3	92	31	46.00	0/0	1	1/43	67.00	0/0	
23	Dilhara Fernando	Sri Lanka	v Africa XI; June 9, 2007	v Africa XI; June 9, 2007	1	–	–	–	–/–	4	4/36	9.00	1/0	
24	Mohammad Rafique	Bangladesh	v Africa XI; June 9, 2007	v Africa XI; June 10, 2007	2	1	1	1.00	0/0	6	4/65	21.16	1/0	
25	Upul Tharanga	Sri Lanka	v Africa XI; June 10, 2007	v Africa XI; June 10, 2007	1	10	10	10.00	0/0	–	–	–	–	

== See also ==
- World Cricket Tsunami Appeal
- 2005 Afro-Asian Cup
- 2007 Afro-Asia Cup
