= 2007 Afro-Asia Cup =

Cricket tournament hosted in India

	Asian XI	Africa XI
- Dates: 5 June 2007 – 10 June 2007
Captains	Mahela Jayawardene (ODI); Shoaib Malik (T20)	Justin Kemp (ODI); Tanmay Mishra (T20)

One Day International series
- Results: Asian XI won the 3-match series 3–0
Most runs	Mahela Jayawardene (217)	Shaun Pollock (223)
Most wickets	Mohammad Rafique (8)	Morné Morkel (8)
- Player of the series: Mahela Jayawardene (Asia XI)

Twenty20 International series
- Results: Asian XI won the 1-match series 1–0
Most runs	Tillakaratne Dilshan (47)	Loots Bosman (52)
Most wickets	S. Sreesanth (2)	Nehemiah Odhiambo (2); Thandi Tshabalala (2)

The second Afro-Asia Cup was played from 6 June until 10 June 2007, hosted by India. The three ODI and one Twenty20 matches were broadcast live on ESPN, after Nimbus had pulled out from the deal with Asian Cricket Council. The Twenty20 match did not have official status as a Twenty20 international or a regular Twenty20 match.

Asia XI claimed the first title in the competition's history, following a tied series in 2005, with a 3–0 whitewash of the Africa XI. Asian XI captain Mahela Jayawardene was named player of the tournament for his 217 runs, including a half century and a century, in the three ODIs. This cup held the Record for the highest overall runs scored in a 3-match series with 1892 runs being scored. Later it was broken by India vs England in January 2017 with an overall total of 2090 runs.

== Squads ==
Twenty20 Squads
ODI Squads

Africa XI
Player	Nationality
Tanmay Mishra (c)	Kenya
Morris Ouma (wk)	Kenya
Alex Obanda	Kenya
Nehemiah Odhiambo	Kenya
Keith Dabengwa	Zimbabwe
Friday Kasteni	Zimbabwe
Tawanda Mupariwa	Zimbabwe
Loots Bosman	South Africa
Morné Morkel	South Africa
Thandi Tshabalala	South Africa
Gulam Bodi	South Africa

Asia XI
Player	Nationality
Shoaib Malik (c)	Pakistan
Kamran Akmal (wk)	Pakistan
Imran Nazir	Pakistan
Shahid Afridi	Pakistan
Tillakaratne Dilshan	Sri Lanka
Farveez Maharoof	Sri Lanka
Abdur Razzak	Bangladesh
Mashrafe Mortaza	Bangladesh
Mohammad Ashraful	Bangladesh
Tamim Iqbal	Bangladesh
Sachin Tendulkar	India
Munaf Patel	India

Africa XI
Player	Nationality
Justin Kemp (c)	South Africa
Mark Boucher (wk)	South Africa
Johan Botha	South Africa
AB de Villiers	South Africa
Boeta Dippenaar	South Africa
Albie Morkel	South Africa
Morné Morkel	South Africa
Shaun Pollock	South Africa
Herschelle Gibbs	South Africa
Andrew Hall	South Africa
Jacques Kallis	South Africa
Makhaya Ntini	South Africa
Graeme Smith	South Africa
Thomas Odoyo	Kenya
Peter Ongondo	Kenya
Hiren Varaiya	Kenya
Vusi Sibanda	Zimbabwe
Elton Chigumbura	Zimbabwe

Asia XI
Player	Nationality
Mahela Jayawardene (c)	Sri Lanka
Dilhara Fernando	Sri Lanka
Sanath Jayasuriya	Sri Lanka
Upul Tharanga	Sri Lanka
Lasith Malinga	Sri Lanka
Chaminda Vaas	Sri Lanka
Mahendra Singh Dhoni (wk)	India
Sourav Ganguly	India
Harbhajan Singh	India
Zaheer Khan	India
Virender Sehwag	India
Sachin Tendulkar	India
Yuvraj Singh	India
Mashrafe Mortaza	Bangladesh
Mohammad Rafique	Bangladesh
Mohammad Yousuf	Pakistan
Mohammad Asif	Pakistan
Shoaib Akhtar	Pakistan

- Players who were originally named in the squad but opted to withdraw from the competition are greyed out.

== Only Twenty20 ==
5 June 2007
(scorecard)

Africa XI; 109/8 (20 overs)	v	Asia XI; 110/4 (15.5 overs)
Loots Bosman 52 (55); Mashrafe Mortaza 2/17 (4 overs)		Tillakaratne Dilshan 47* (36); Nehemiah Odhiambo 2/21 (3 overs)

Asia XI won by 6 wickets
Chinnaswamy Stadium, Bangalore, India
Umpires: Arani Jayaprakash (IND) and Vinayak Kulkarni (IND)

- This match did not have Twenty20 International or Twenty20 status.

== ODI series ==
=== 1st ODI ===
6 June 2007
(scorecard)

Asia XI; 317/9 (50 overs)	v	Africa XI; 283 (47.5 overs)
Mohammad Yousuf 66 (74); Morné Morkel 3/68 (10 overs)		Shaun Pollock 130 (110); Sanath Jayasuriya 3/53 (10 overs)

Asia XI won by 34 runs
Chinnaswamy Stadium, Bangalore, India
Umpires: Tony Hill (NZL) and Peter Parker (AUS)
Player of the match: Shaun Pollock (Africa XI)

=== 2nd ODI ===
9 June 2007
(scorecard)

Asia XI; 337/7 (50 overs)	v	Africa XI; 306 (49.5 overs)
Sourav Ganguly 88 (112); Morné Morkel 2/48 (10 overs)		Mark Boucher 73 (71); Dilhara Fernando 4/36 (10 overs)

Asia XI won by 31 runs
M.A. Chidambaram Stadium, Chennai, India
Umpires: Tony Hill (NZL) and Peter Parker (AUS)
Player of the match: Dilhara Fernando (Asia XI)

=== 3rd ODI ===
10 June 2007
(scorecard)

Asia XI; 331/8 (50 overs)	v	Africa XI; 318/7 (50 overs)
Mahendra Singh Dhoni 139* (97); Peter Ongondo 3/35 (10 overs)		Justin Kemp 86 (76); Mohammad Rafique 4/65 (10 overs)

Asia XI won by 13 runs
M.A.Chidambaram Stadium, Chennai, India
Umpires: Tony Hill (NZL) and Peter Parker (AUS)
Player of the match: Mahendra Singh Dhoni (Asia XI)

== See also ==
- 2005 Afro-Asia Cup
