= World Cricket Tsunami Appeal =

Fundraiser in response to the Indian Ocean tsunami

World Cricket Tsunami Appeal logo.

The World Cricket Tsunami Appeal was an effort by the International Cricket Council to raise funds to support the humanitarian relief efforts following the Indian Ocean tsunami of 26 December 2004. It was scheduled to be held over two games but was reduced to one due to an over-crowded international playing schedule and concerns for players' health playing in the April heat in Kolkata. The match was played at the Melbourne Cricket Ground on 10 January 2005.

The tsunami affected several leading cricketing nations. India, Sri Lanka, and Bangladesh were the affected Test match playing nations, as were Malaysia, Thailand, the Maldives and Indonesia among the other associate & affiliate members of the ICC.

== One-Day Internationals ==
The centrepiece of world cricket's efforts to support the victims of the tsunami was to have been a two-match one-day series between a World XI and an Asian XI. The first of these games was played at the Melbourne Cricket Ground, Australia on 10 January 2005. The match was telecast in at least 122 countries. The second was to be held in Kolkata, India, originally scheduled for 13 February, but on 28 January 2005 the ICC announced it would instead be played in the second half of April. The second match was cancelled on 28 February.

Travelex sponsored the first match, which was a 78,000 sell-out, for A$1 million. Two C-130H Hercules aircraft, similar to those used by the Royal Australian Air Force to carry supplies to regions devastated by the massive earthquake and resulting tsunamis, flew over the MCG during the break between innings. The first ODI, which the World XI won by 112 runs, raised approximately A$17 million, while original estimations suggested only A$5 million would be raised from the Australians.

The games were designated as One Day Internationals by the ICC, the first time a game between teams not representing separate cricketing nations was so designated. This designation attracted criticism from cricket statisticians.

=== Teams for the first ODI ===
World XI squad:

World XI Coach: (Australia) Steve Waugh	Asia XI Coach: (England) Bob Woolmer
(Australia) Ricky Ponting (C); (Cricket West Indies) Dwayne Bravo; (New Zealand) Chris Cairns; (New Zealand) Stephen Fleming; (Cricket West Indies) Chris Gayle; (Australia) Adam Gilchrist (wk); (England) Darren Gough; (Australia) Matthew Hayden; (Cricket West Indies) Brian Lara; (Australia) Glenn McGrath; (New Zealand) Daniel Vettori; (Australia) Shane Warne; (Cricket West Indies) Dwayne Bravo (12th man)	(India) Sourav Ganguly (C); (Pakistan) Abdul Razzaq; (India) Rahul Dravid; (Sri Lanka) Sanath Jayasuriya; (India) Zaheer Khan; (India) Anil Kumble; (Sri Lanka) Muttiah Muralitharan; (Sri Lanka) Kumar Sangakkara (wk); (India) Virender Sehwag; (India) Sachin Tendulkar; (Sri Lanka) Chaminda Vaas; (Pakistan) Mohammad Yousuf; (Bangladesh) Alok Kapali (12th man)

=== Match officials ===
The onfield umpires were Rudi Koertzen (SA) and Billy Bowden (NZ). Chris Broad (Eng) was the match referee. Bob Parry (Aus) was the TV umpire. All the match officials waived their match fees.

On 7 January 2005 five of the World XI players, Darren Gough, Chris Cairns, Daniel Vettori, Chris Gayle and Dwayne Bravo sent messages of hope and called on cricket fans to support the Appeal.

== First ODI ==
=== World XI innings ===
World XI captain Ponting won the toss and chose to bat, a decision which looked to have backfired early when opener Chris Gayle was caught behind off Zaheer Khan for only 1. Big hitting Adam Gilchrist (24) hit the first six of the match, which by itself earned A$50,000 for the appeal courtesy of Toyota.

Gilchrist was himself caught behind off Zaheer shortly thereafter. The ensuing Ponting/Brian Lara partnership saw both players reach half-centuries, with Lara's 50 coming in 76 balls, a relatively slow speed compared with the power-hitting to be seen later. Lara was dismissed for 52, due to a well-taken Chaminda Vaas catch in the deep off Anil Kumble. Ponting, who was closing in on his century, was then forced to play second-fiddle to a whirlwind innings by New Zealand all-rounder Chris Cairns, who at one point had contributed more than 40 runs off a 60 run partnership. Kumble bore the brunt of this attack, with several balls disappearing into the crowd for 6. Cairns also contributed the shot of the match, a straight-driven 6 off Muttiah Muralitharan from halfway down the pitch.

Ponting's century was the cue for him to cut loose, hitting two consecutive 6s before being stumped off Kumble. This resulted in the surprising appearance of professional tailender Glenn McGrath at number 6 on the back of his "brilliant" 61 against New Zealand earlier that summer–ahead of both Stephen Fleming and Australian opener Matthew Hayden. Commentators were barely able to keep straight faces as "the newest all-rounder in world cricket" attempted to slog Muralitharan for 6 on the first ball, unfortunately misjudging the spin of the delivery and being easily caught by Yousuf Youhana.

Cairns completed his blazing 50 and became even more cavalier with his wicket, eventually being stumped off Muralitharan as well, but the damage had already been done with the World XI looking at a score well above 300. Stephen Fleming contributed a quickfire 30, losing batting partner Hayden for only 2 (stumped off Muralitharan again), before being clean bowled by Vaas. The final over featured a partnership between spinners Daniel Vettori (27 not out) and Shane Warne (2 not out), with Warne's comeback to limited-overs cricket being greeting rapturously by the fans.

The innings ended on a somewhat farcical note, as Warne miscounted the number of balls left in the final over and began leaving the field with Vaas having one delivery left. Rising to the occasion, umpire Bowden issued Warne with a "yellow card", to cheers from the crowd. Warne was recalled to the wicket and the World XI finished with a total of 344 for 8. As match sponsors Travelex were pledging a donation of A$1,000 per run, and Toyota A$50,000 for each for the six sixes, the World XI had earned A$644,000.

=== Asian XI innings ===
The ACC Asian XI were faced with the challenge of rewriting history, since no team had made a successful run chase of 345 in cricket history (the highest total in 50-over ODI's successfully chased – at the time – being 326 runs). Openers Jayasuriya, whose mother had been injured in the tsunami, and Sehwag made a good start, with Sehwag hitting another 6, but the introduction of Cairns into the attack proved Jayasuriya's undoing, with the Sri Lankan (28) captain edging a soft catch to Fleming at first slip. The next wickets all fell to spin, with Warne claiming Sehwag (48) via a boundary catch by Gayle. The dismissal was almost a carbon-copy of the way in which Sehwag fell in the Boxing Day Test of 2003.

Vettori was able to get Sourav Ganguly (22) to hit an easy catch to Darren Gough at mid-off, while Yousuf Youhana fell for just 4 as Ponting took another catch off Warne's bowling. The partnership between Rahul Dravid (71 not out) and keeper-batsman Kumar Sangakkara (24) was seen as potentially a ray of hope, as both men were capable of remaining calm and playing shots, however Sangakkara edged a Gough delivery to Gilchrist. Pakistani all-rounder Abdul Razzaq (11) began promisingly, but became another victim of the desire to raise the scoring rate, being stumped by Gilchrist off Vettori.

The tail provided only sporadic resistance, with Vaas (7) being caught by Gayle off Vettori. Zaheer Khan (0) achieved the unwanted distinction of being run out without facing a ball as he fell to a well-executed Chris Gayle throw.

Steve Waugh, the World XI coach/manager also came onto the field for a spot of fielding. Wild cheers erupted whenever he fielded the ball; a brilliant diving save showed that he could still play despite a year out of the international arena.

Kumble (11) held on for 7 balls before "all-rounder" McGrath finally claimed his only wicket for the match, clean-bowling him. Gayle was given the job of bowling the 40th over, which featured a moment of indecision by Rahul Dravid as Vettori swooped on the ball, while Dravid was able to avoid being run out, his batting partner Muralitharan – running to the danger end – was not so lucky and fell for a duck, completing the Asian XI's innings of 232.

With one six in the innings, the ACC Asian XI had won A$282,000 from the sponsors, bringing the total being paid by Travelex and Toyota for the teams' performances to A$926,000.

=== Scorecard ===
10 January 2005
14:15 UTC+11 (D/N)
Scorecard

ICC World XI; 344/8 (50 overs)	v	Asia XI; 232 (39.5 overs)
(Australia) Ricky Ponting 115 (102) (Sri Lanka) Muttiah Muralitharan 3/59 (10 overs)		(India) Rahul Dravid 75* (71) (New Zealand) Daniel Vettori 3/58 (10 overs)

ICC World XI won by 112 runs
Melbourne Cricket Ground, Melbourne, Australia
Umpires: (New Zealand) Billy Bowden and (South Africa) Rudi Koertzen
Player of the match: Ricky Ponting (World XI)

- ICC World XI won the toss and elected to bat

=== Designated charity ===
Money from the match went to World Vision International, a charity that helps children and their communities worldwide.

=== Media coverage ===
In Australia, the game was televised on the Nine Network (and its regional affiliates – WIN and NBN networks), and on ABC Local Radio. The game was broadcast to 122 countries. In the United Kingdom the game was being shown live on Sky Sports Xtra.

== Other fundraising ==
Cricket also engaged in other fundraising efforts.

=== New Zealand vs FICA World XI one-day series ===
Notable among these was a series of three one-day matches in late January between New Zealand and a FICA World XI. Unlike the World XI vs Asian XI matches, these three games were not granted official status as One-Day Internationals.

At the time of the tsunami, the Sri Lankan national team was touring New Zealand (the two sides were at the time ranked second and third in the world in one-day cricket). The departure of the team not only saw a desperate need for fundraising, but also saw the New Zealand team faced with an absence of an international cricket series. In order to fill the gap in the schedule and provide more funds for disaster relief, a series was hastily arranged between the New Zealand national team and a team drawn from top international players from overseas, captained by Australia's Shane Warne.

The three matches raised a total of $NZ 1,088,563 ($US 772,000).

==== The first match ====
The first match, at Jade Stadium, Christchurch on 21 January 2005, was a one-sided match. The world team batted first and lost early wickets. At one stage they were reduced to 20 for the loss of four wickets, before a partnership by Graeme Hick and Jonty Rhodes helped the team a less embarrassing, yet still low, total of 158. Any fear that spectators would not get their money's-worth from a truncated match were soon allayed by an astonishing innings from New Zealand captain Stephen Fleming, who bludgeoned the bowling in scoring 106 from just 57 deliveries, including nine sixes and ten fours. Muttiah Muralitharan, arguably the world's best spin bowler, came in for most of the punishment, being hit for seven sixes in just three overs. New Zealand reached the winning total for the loss of only one wicket.

==== The second match ====
The second match was a more even affair. It was held at Westpac Stadium, Wellington, on 24 January. New Zealand batted first and scored well in the early stages, but lost wickets at vital times, much of the damage being done by bowlers Andrew Bichel and Lance Klusener. Only Nathan Astle was able to produce a big score, finishing on 109. New Zealand were all out for 256, a respectable score, but less than they would have wanted on what was a good batting pitch. The total was never going to be enough, however, especially after Matthew Elliott and Nick Knight got the World XI off to a flying start. Elliott was particularly belligerent, his 57 runs including three sixes. Although the World XI lost several wickets, their batting continued at a fast pace, and they reached the required target in the 48th over for the loss of seven wickets.

==== The third match ====
The third match was somewhat disappointing. It was played at Westpac Trust Park, Hamilton, on 26 January. The World XI struggled to deal with a variable pitch, and were bowled out for 81 in 20.5 overs. Nick Knight scored 43, but the rest of the batsmen fell quickly. Chris Cairns took 6 for 12 and Jeff Wilson 3 for 6. The New Zealand batsmen did not find conditions much easier, as Ian Harvey took 4 for 17, but managed to reach 83 for 6 in the 16th over, winning the series 2–1.

To compensate the crowd for the unusually short game, the players agreed to play a 10 over-a-side match later in the day. More than 30 sixes were hit, as the game finished in a tie with both sides scoring 178.

=== MCC vs International XI (14 June) ===
Marylebone Cricket Club (MCC) won by 112 runs

In a charity match at Lord's, Brian Lara came to regret the decision to bowl first, although the match was hardly to be taken seriously. Andy Flower, the old Zimbabwe stalwart, made a quickfire 55 near the end of the innings, Stephen Fleming smashed some lovely cover drives on his way to a 46-ball fifty before edging Makhaya Ntini to third man for 62, and Jacques Kallis also made 62 as he paired up well with VVS Laxman. The deep batting order, aided by Lara's willingness to utilise his bowlers – the pick of the International XI, Chaminda Vaas, who utilised the English conditions as he took two for 19, only got to bowl seven overs, while Lara himself bowled two and the International XI used all their available bowlers – and the MCC made 327 for 7.

In reply, the International XI got off to a blazing start, as Sanath Jayasuriya and Graeme Smith lifted them to 65 for 1 after ten overs. With Lara coming in at four and looking settled, things looked good, but the wheels fell off in their chase of the massive total. Lara charged Anil Kumble to Shoaib Akhtar for 42, no other International batsman passed 20, and the team crumbled to 189 for 7 – Smith stumped for 68. Chris Gayle redeemed his poor batting effort by removing the tail, and the International XI were all out for 215.

=== Asia vs Rest of the World Twenty20 match ===
Surrey County Cricket Club hosted a Twenty20 game between Asia and the Rest of the World in aid of the tsunami appeal on 20 June 2005 at the Oval. The game won approval from the England and Wales Cricket Board and the International Cricket Council. The Asia XI won the toss and decided to bat, but the International XI won by 6 wickets with Australian Greg Blewett declared man of the match for his innings of 91 not out. The match attracted a crowd of 23,000 and raised £1.1 million.

== See also ==
- Football for Hope
- IRB Rugby Aid Match
- The Big Appeal (Bushfire Relief Cricket Match)

== Related links ==
- World Vision website
- List of items being sold by Cricket Australia on ebay
- Series homepage on Cricinfo

== Other reference ==
- Surrey County Cricket Club website
