= Afro-Asia Cup =

Charity cricket series

- Countries: Asia Countries & Africa Countries
- Format: One Day International
- First edition: 2005
- Latest edition: 2007
- Tournament format: Series
- Number of teams: 2
- Current champion: Asia XI (2007)
- Current trophy holder: Asia XI (2007)

Afro-Asia Cup was a series of charity cricket matches played between an Asian XI and an African XI. The series was two times played in 2005 and 2007, and the proceeds from the matches were intended to be used for development in Asia and Africa. The first Afro-Asia Cup was played in 2005, and consisted of three one-day international (ODI) matches, played in South Africa. The first match was won by the Asian XI, while the other two matches were won by the African XI, giving them the series win.

The second edition in 2007 consisted of three ODIs and three Twenty20 Internationals (T20Is). The ODIs were played in India, and the T20Is in South Africa. The Asian XI won the ODI series 3–0, while the African XI won the T20I series 2-0 (one match was abandoned due to rain). Some of the best players from both continents participated in these matches, making it an exciting series for cricket fans. However, the series was discontinued after 2007, and has not been played since.

== Editions ==
- 2005 Afro-Asia Cup
- 2007 Afro-Asia Cup
