= 2005 Afro-Asia Cup =

Cricket competition

| | African XI | Asia XI |
- Dates: 17 – 21 August 2005
| Captains | Shaun Pollock; Graeme Smith | Inzamam-ul-Haq |

One Day International series
- Results: 3-match series drawn 1–1
| Most runs | Ashwell Prince (78) | Kumar Sangakkara (97) |
| Most wickets | Shaun Pollock (4) | Zaheer Khan (9) |
- Player of the series: Zaheer Khan (Asia XI)

The 2005 Afro-Asia Cup was a cricket competition played for the first time in 2005 and which is intended to run for at least three years. The idea was to raise money for the Asian Cricket Council and the African Cricket Association, and the whole venture was given a massive boost when the ICC, somewhat controversially, agreed to give the series of one-day matches full ODI status.

The inaugural competition was a series of three one day matches played between an Asian XI and an African XI. Controversially, the games have been awarded official One Day International status. The teams were selected by former Test match players rather than by national selectors.

The ICC expected that there would be a strong competitive tender for television rights. However, the main television broadcasters, ESPN/Star and Ten Sports, declined to bid. The rights were eventually bought by Nimbus Sports for the 2005 competition and the next two competitions in the following years.

There was much controversy over the final squad lists: many of the leading players were either unavailable for selection, withdrew from participating or chose to fulfil commitments with domestic teams.

The 2005 tournament was closely fought. Africa won the first match by just two runs, while Asia won the second by 18 runs to set up a series decider. However, after Africa had been bowled out for 106, the Asian innings was curtailed by rain, and the match eventually declared a no result. Thus, the series was tied 1–1 and the trophy shared.

== Squads ==
Africa XI
| Player | Nationality |
|---|---|
| Shaun Pollock (c) | South Africa |
| Graeme Smith (c) | South Africa |
| Mark Boucher (wk) | South Africa |
| Nicky Boje | South Africa |
| AB de Villiers | South Africa |
| Boeta Dippenaar | South Africa |
| Jacques Kallis | South Africa |
| Justin Kemp | South Africa |
| Albie Morkel | South Africa |
| Justin Ontong | South Africa |
| Ashwell Prince | South Africa |
| Jacques Rudolph | South Africa |
| Dale Steyn | South Africa |
| Monde Zondeki | South Africa |
| Tatenda Taibu (wk) | Zimbabwe |
| Andy Blignaut | Zimbabwe |
| Heath Streak | Zimbabwe |
| Collins Obuya | Kenya |
| Thomas Odoyo | Kenya |
| Steve Tikolo | Kenya |

Asian XI
| Player | Nationality |
|---|---|
| Inzamam-ul-Haq (c) | Pakistan |
| Abdul Razzaq | Pakistan |
| Naved-ul-Hasan | Pakistan |
| Shahid Afridi | Pakistan |
| Shoaib Akhtar | Pakistan |
| Mohammad Yousuf | Pakistan |
| Kumar Sangakkara (wk) | Sri Lanka |
| Chaminda Vaas | Sri Lanka |
| Mahela Jayawardene | Sri Lanka |
| Muttiah Muralitharan | Sri Lanka |
| Sanath Jayasuriya | Sri Lanka |
| Ashish Nehra | India |
| Anil Kumble | India |
| Irfan Pathan | India |
| Rahul Dravid | India |
| Virender Sehwag | India |
| Zaheer Khan | India |
| Mashrafe Mortaza | Bangladesh |
| Mohammad Ashraful | Bangladesh |
Reserve players
| Khaled Mashud | Bangladesh |
| Marvan Atapattu | Sri Lanka |

- Note: Greyed out players withdrew from the competition.

=== African XI squad ===
The African squad was selected from players from South Africa, Zimbabwe and Kenya. As the first match clashed with Zimbabwe's Test match against New Zealand, the Zimbabweans did not play in the first game. Justin Ontong was available for selection for the first game instead. Graeme Smith still had two matches of a four-match suspension to serve, and so was unavailable for the first two games.

=== Asian XI squad ===
The Asian side was selected from players from Pakistan, India, Sri Lanka and Bangladesh. With the exception of Bangladesh (whose selector had previously only played in the ICC Trophy), each country had one ex-Test cricketer as a selector: Majid Khan (Pakistan), Ravi Shastri (India), Graeme Labrooy (Sri Lanka) and Shafiq-ul Haque (Bangladesh). There was controversy surrounding the omission of Indian captain Sourav Ganguly from the Asian side, leading to Ganguly criticising the selection panel and process; although there were reports that the selection panel decided unanimously against including Ganguly, and that any suggestion that he should have been included would have led to Majid Khan and Ravi Shastri walking out.

=== Criticism ===
The competition was considered to be missing a large number of the top players from each continent, for several underlying reasons. Pakistan made it clear that its players did not have to play if they did not want to, and leading South African bowler Makhaya Ntini announced that he would be playing for English county side Warwickshire and was unavailable for selection for the African side. Injuries also ravaged the tournament, as four players pulled out a week before the matches were due to start, whilst other big names – including Sachin Tendulkar – were not even available for selection due to injury.

== Matches ==
=== First ODI ===
17 August 2005
scorecard

| Africa XI; 198 (44.3 overs) | v | Asia XI; 196 (48.1 overs) |
| Ashwell Prince 78* (113); Zaheer Khan 3/37 (8 overs) | | Abdul Razzaq 38 (77); Shaun Pollock 3/32 (10 overs) |

Africa XI won by 2 runs
Centurion Park, Centurion
Umpires: Steve Davis and Billy Doctrove
Player of the match: Ashwell Prince (Africa XI)

In front of a crowd of about 1,000 people at Centurion – usually figures more associated with domestic cricket matches – Africa won the first of three ODIs. The African side included ten South Africans and two Kenyans – and one of the Kenyans was substituted for a South African without getting the chance to bat. Zaheer Khan made early breakthroughs as Africa collapsed to 57 for 5 – Justin Ontong and Steve Tikolo both dismissed for ducks – but Ashwell Prince and Mark Boucher set Africa back on the right track with an 86-run partnership. Prince finished on 78 not out as he ran out of partners to bat with, Africa eventually being dismissed for 198. Asia, however, lost wickets at regular intervals, but a 24-run ninth-wicket partnership between Zaheer Khan and Shoaib Akhtar looked to turn it Asia's way. Asia needed to eke out five runs for the last wicket, with twenty-two balls to spare, but Ashish Nehra was bowled by a straight delivery from ODI debutant Dale Steyn, and Asia finished two runs short of victory.

=== Second ODI ===
20 August 2005
scorecard

| Asia XI; 267/7 (50 overs) | v | Africa XI; 250 (49.2 overs) |
| Kumar Sangakkara 61 (70); Thomas Odoyo 3/45 (10 overs) | | Steve Tikolo 43 (43); Zaheer Khan 3/43 (9.2 overs) |

Asia XI won by 17 runs
Sahara Stadium Kingsmead, Durban
Umpires: Steve Davis and Billy Doctrove
Player of the match: Kumar Sangakkara (Asia XI)

Asia XI rebounded at Kingsmead to square the series with one match to play. Good contributions from the entire top order – the top six hit one six each, Shahid Afridi getting out the next ball but all the others at least passing 30 – saw Asia XI to 267 for 7, with the two Sri Lankans Kumar Sangakkara and Mahela Jayawardene making half-centuries. Kenyan Thomas Odoyo was statistically the best bowler for the African XI, with three wickets for 45, making him tied best wicket-taker for the African XI so far in the series. Indeed, the Kenyan contingent of the African side performed well, with Steve Tikolo making a run-a-ball 43 from number seven – but AB de Villiers used up 67 balls for making his 39, the African XI had to suffer three run outs, and in the end two wickets from Zaheer Khan wrapped up the African innings – 18 runs short of victory.

=== Third ODI ===
21 August 2005
scorecard

| Africa XI; 106 (32.5 overs) | v | Asia XI; 8/2 (3 overs) |
| Shaun Pollock 44 (35); Zaheer Khan 3/21 (10 overs) | | Virender Sehwag 5 (5); Dale Steyn 1/2 (1 over) |

No result
Sahara Stadium Kingsmead, Durban
Umpires: Steve Davis and Billy Doctrove
Player of the match: Shoaib Akhtar (Asia XI)

After Africa XI had been bowled out for a measly 106, rain poured down steadily on Kingsmead, and the umpires eventually declared that play was not possible. The rain had already caused the start of the game to be delayed for two hours, before Shoaib Akhtar and Zaheer Khan unleashed their fast bowling on the African side. When Tatenda Taibu departed for 10, the score was 51 for 7, and only good hitting and running from Shaun Pollock, who hit 44 not out, carried Africa past 100. Steve Tikolo, the top-scorer from the last match, was intriguingly dropped. Then, Dale Steyn and Shaun Pollock ripped out the two Asian openers Virender Sehwag and Shahid Afridi, and, with the score eight for 2, the weather intervened. No further play was possible, and thus the two continents shared the title.

== See also ==
- 2007 Afro-Asia Cup
