= Loots Bosman =

Cricket player of South Africa

Personal information
- Full name: Lungile Edgar Bosman
- Born: 14 April 1977 (age 49); Kimberley, Cape Province, South Africa
- Batting: Right-handed
- Bowling: Right-arm medium
- Role: Batsman

International information
- National side: South Africa (2006–2010)
- ODI debut (cap 84): 15 September 2006 v Zimbabwe
- Last ODI: 27 February 2010 v India
- ODI shirt no.: 14
- T20I debut (cap 19): 24 February 2006 v Australia
- Last T20I: 27 October 2010 v Pakistan

Domestic team information
- Years: Team
- 1997/98–2003/04: Griqualand West
- 2004/05–2008/09: Eagles (squad no. 14)
- 2005/06: Free State
- 2007/08: Griqualand West
- 2009/10–2011/12: KwaZulu-Natal
- 2009/10–2011/12: Dolphins (squad no. 14)
- 2010: Derbyshire
- 2012/13: Free State
- 2012/13: Knights
- 2013/14: Griqualand West

Career statistics
Competition	ODI	T20I	FC	LA
Matches	14	14	104	170
Runs scored	301	323	4,962	4,388
Batting average	25.08	24.84	28.51	28.86
100s/50s	0/2	0/3	6/25	2/23
Top score	88	94	140	150
Balls bowled	–	–	576	97
Wickets	–	–	8	1
Bowling average	–	–	42.87	92.00
5 wickets in innings	–	–	0	0
10 wickets in match	–	–	0	0
Best bowling	–	–	3/25	1/36
Catches/stumpings	3/–	1/–	57/–	39/–
- Source: CricketArchive, 4 November 2023

Lungile Edgar Bosman (born 14 April 1977) is a former South African international cricketer. He was a top order right-handed batsman and occasional right-arm medium pace bowler. He played domestic cricket for Dolphins, and appeared for South Africa in both One Day Internationals and Twenty20 Internationals. He scored the first century in the Standard Bank Pro20 Series in the 2004–05 season.

A hard-hitting opener and an archetype of the successful Twenty20 batsman, Loots Bosman was born in Kimberley in the Cape Province, where he was raised by his grandfather, and made his debut for Griqualand West at the beginning of the 1997–98 season. But despite some success with provincial and South Africa A teams, it was only when Twenty20 cricket arrived in South Africa that Bosman etched his name into his country's cricketing consciousness. Pro20 cricket's first outing came at the end of the 2003–04 season, and Bosman – who was now part of the Eagles team under the new franchise system – topped the batting charts with 219 runs at a strike-rate of 120.99 and a high score of 84* despite the fact that he was asked to bat in the middle order.

Bosman turned down a contract with the Indian Cricket League in October 2007, instead signing up for the Mumbai Indians in the first edition of the Indian Premier League, though he couldn't make it into a starting XI. Bosman had a quiet international year in 2008, playing just one Twenty20 against Bangladesh, and at the end of the 2008–09 domestic season moved from the Eagles to the Dolphins franchise in KwaZulu-Natal. Initially named in a provisional squad of 30 for the 2009 World Twenty20, he couldn't find a place in the final 15, but in November of that year he fell one blow short of what would have been, at the time, just the second international Twenty20 century. Smashing 94 from just 45 balls, including nine sixes, against England at Centurion, he was also involved in a world record 170-run opening stand with Graeme Smith as South Africa racked up a mammoth 241 for 6.

Bosman finally made it to a World Twenty20 tournament in the Caribbean in 2010, but appeared strangely out of sorts and made just eight runs in two innings, failing to find the boundary once. Despite that failure, he was signed by Derbyshire as their overseas player for the Friends Provident t20 tournament in 2010, and responded in superb fashion, hammering 94 off 50 balls to set up a crushing 65-run win over a strong Yorkshire team in June.

As he heads into his mid-30s, Bosman's opportunities for South Africa may begin to wane, and though he will be remembered as a punishing Twenty20 batsman, it remains a mystery as to why he was never able to take his success in the format into 50-over or first-class cricket.

== Career ==
=== Early career ===
Bosman made his début for Griqualand West at the start of the 1997–98 season, batting at number seven, and opening the bowling in a 45-over match against Natal. He took his only List A wicket during this match, bowling Dale Benkenstein. His first-class début came three weeks later, playing in a SuperSport Series match against Free State. He scored 96, and put on a record Griqualand West fifth-wicket partnership of 243 with Pieter Barnard. After a début season in which he averaged 26.92 in first-class cricket, Bosman was selected as part of the South Africa A squad to tour Sri Lanka. Bosman was a key figure in South Africa A's campaign in a triangular one-day tournament in Sri Lanka in 2005–06, but it was his exploits at home that earned him a call-up to the squad for the Twenty20 International against Australia in mid-February. His 22-ball fifty against the Highveld Lions in February was the fastest in the Standard Bank Pro20 series. Player of the Series in the 2006 edition, Bosman became the first batsman to score a century in the competition, reaching three figures in just 43 balls. He failed to get going in the 2007 final, but his contributions to the Eagles clinching the Pro20 title were enough to earn him a look-in for the national Twenty20 team. He missed the inaugural ICC World Twenty20 due to a back injury, though Bosman insisted at the time that he was fit to play and he was subsequently suspended for one domestic match after being found guilty of "unbecoming or detrimental" conduct by Cricket South Africa over comments made to a local newspaper about coach Mickey Arthur after he was left out of the squad.

Bosman scored his maiden first-class century during the SuperSport Series match against North West early in the 2000–01 season, remaining 115 not out as Griqualand West scored 284. During this season, Bosman was promoted to open the innings alongside Pieter Koortzen in 45-over matches. In January 2001, the pair made an opening partnership of 173 against North West, followed by 169 against Gauteng. In 2001–02, Bosman made his first appearance in the Hong Kong International Cricket Sixes tournament, helping South Africa reach the final with two rapidly scored 30s, making 35 in seven balls against Hong Kong, and 31 in nine balls in the final as South Africa failed to chase down Pakistan's 98. On his return from the Hong Kong tournament, Bosman passed his previous bests in both limited overs and first-class cricket, hitting 92 not out against North West in the Standard Bank Cup, and 121 against Northerns in the Super Six stage of the SuperSport Series.

He was part of the South Africa A squad to play the touring India A and Australia A touring teams in 2002; but after scoring 62 in the first four-day match, he failed to post any significant totals. He made his highest score with 140 against Western Province in his second SuperSport Series match of the 2002–03. Bosman was part of the South Africa squad for the Hong Kong International Cricket Sixes again in 2002–03, losing his wicket for 0 and 7 in his first two matches, before a nine ball 32 in the third-place play-off against India. The end of the season saw him play in five matches for 'The Rest' against South Africa A.

=== 2003–2005 ===
The following 2003–04 season, Bosman finished second in the batting charts behind Stephen Cook, scoring 491 runs at an average of 61.37. The campaign was highlighted by a 57 ball 99 not out, in which he hit 13 boundaries, including eight sixes against Eastern Province. The end of that season saw the introduction of Pro20 cricket to South Africa. Bosman topped the batting charts in this form, making 219 runs for Eagles, the combined Free State and Griqualand West cricket team. In his first match of the campaign, he made his best score of the season, hitting 84 not out in 44 balls as Eagles beat Dolphins by 4 runs.

The following season saw Bosman have his best summer in first-class cricket, scoring 640 runs at an average of 40.00, with five half-centuries. Later in the season, he scored the first century in South African domestic Pro20, making 104 runs off 45 balls in an innings that included nine 6s and seven 4s as Eagles beat Lions by 130 runs. He spent the South African winter of 2005 playing for East Lancashire in the Lancashire League. Although not recognised at this point in his career as a bowler, he equalled the club's best-bowling performance in his first appearance, taking 9/22 against Colne.

=== International recognition ===
He made his international Twenty20 debut on 24 February 2006 at the New Wanderers Stadium in Johannesburg. He impressed with his rapid scoring rate and clean hitting ability. He was named in the South African Twenty20 World Championship squad, but was later withdrawn because of a back injury he picked up on an earlier tour of Zimbabwe.

Most recently, Bosman made himself known again in the T20 Series against England in November 2009. He hit 58 off 31 balls in the first game, and 94 off 44 balls in the second, setting a world-record International T20 partnership of 170 with Graeme Smith to set up a South Africa victory.
