= Cap (sport) =

Term for a player's appearance in a game at the international level

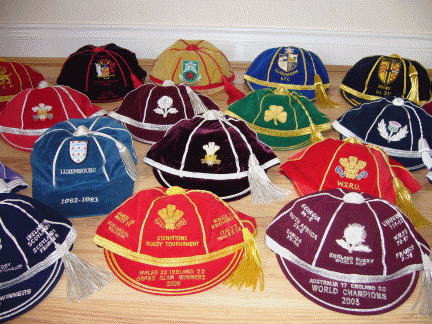
Various international honours caps

In sport, a cap is a player's appearance in a game at the international level. The term dates from the practice in the United Kingdom of awarding a cap to every player in an international match of rugby football and association football.

The practice was first approved on 10 May 1886 for association football after a proposal made by N. Lane Jackson, founder of the Corinthians:

That all players taking part for England in future international matches be presented with a white silk cap with red rose embroidered on the front. These to be termed International Caps.

The act of awarding a cap is now international and is applied to other sports. Although in some sports physical caps may not now always be given (whether at all or for each appearance) the term cap for an international or other appearance has been retained as an indicator of the number of occasions on which a sportsperson has represented a team in a particular sport. Thus, a "cap" is awarded for each game played and so a player who has played x games for the team is said to have been capped x times or have won x caps.

The practice of awarding a physical cap varies from sport to sport. It may be awarded before a player's debut or, particularly for national teams, a commemorative cap may be awarded after a player reaches the 100th cap.

== Association football ==
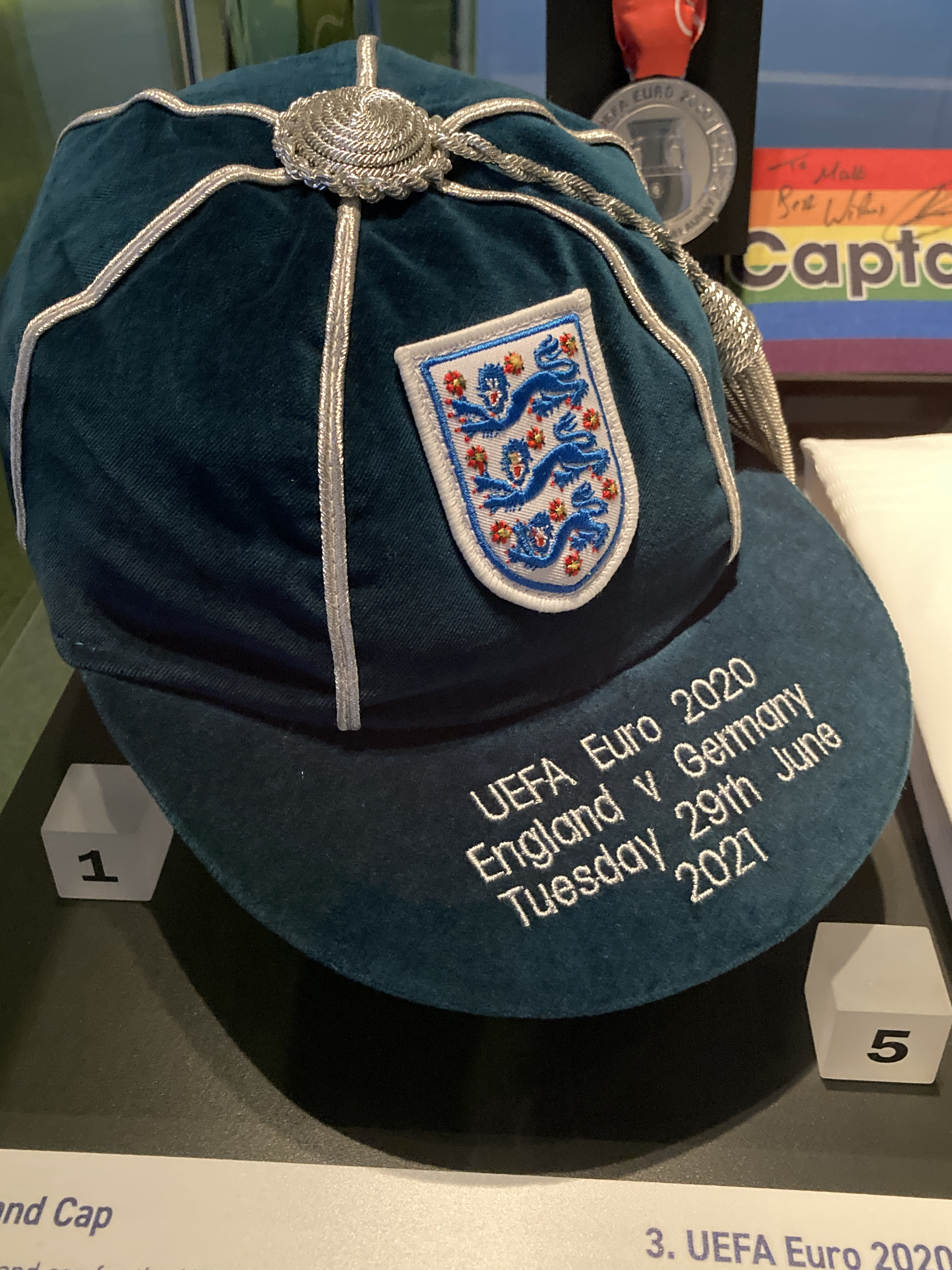
England cap awarded to Harry Kane for his appearance against Germany in June 2021 at the 2020 UEFA Euro, his 58th overall.

In the early days of football, the concept of each team wearing a set of matching shirts had not been universally adopted, so each side would distinguish itself from the other by wearing a specific sort of cap. An early illustration of the first international football match between Scotland and England in 1872 shows the Scottish players wearing cowls, and the English wearing a variety of school caps. When Aston Villa Football Club played their first match in 1874, they played in royal blue caps and stockings, scarlet and royal blue hooped shirts and white shorts. The club rules stated "No member can take place in a match unless in the above uniform".

Some men's association football teams still award physical caps. Players are awarded one cap for every match they play – unless they play in a World Cup or European Championship finals tournament, then they are given a single cap for the competition, with the names of all their opponents stitched into the fabric of the cap itself. For example, when David Beckham made his one-hundredth appearance for England, because a number of his appearances had been at World Cup and European Championship final tournaments for which he could only receive one cap, he received only his 85th physical cap. In Scotland, for many years the practice was to present caps only for appearances in the British Home Championship, meaning that several players never received one (including those in their 1958 FIFA World Cup squad); this anomaly was rectified retrospectively in the 2000s after pressure from players' families.

FIFA recognises certain international games as ones where a player can be awarded a cap – these games are regarded as International "A" games. These are matches in which both nations field their first Representative Team.

=== Records ===
The world record holder for the highest number of international caps as of 5 November 2010 is retired American player Kristine Lilly, who has 354 caps. Cristiano Ronaldo of Portugal holds the most caps among men only; he surpassed Bader Al-Mutawa with his 197th cap on 23 March 2023, before extending his record to 198 caps on 26 March 2023. The first footballer to win 100 international caps was Billy Wright of England's Wolverhampton Wanderers. Wright went on to appear 105 times for England, 90 of them he obtained whilst he was a captain.

Bold denotes players currently active in international football.

==== Men ====
As of 15 November 2026

Most caps in men's association football
Rank	Caps	Player	Nation	Career
1	234	Cristiano Ronaldo	Portugal	2003–2026
2	208	Lionel Messi	Argentina	2005–2026
2	208	**Luka Modrić**	Croatia	2006–present
4	202	Bader Al-Mutawa	Kuwait	2003–2022
5	195	Soh Chin Ann	Malaysia	1969–1984
6	194	**Hassan Al-Haydos**	Qatar	2008–present
7	193	Ahmed Kano	Oman	2003–2019
8	184	Ahmed Hassan	Egypt	1995–2012
9	182	Andrés Guardado	Mexico	2005–2024
10	180	Sergio Ramos	Spain	2005–2023

==== Women ====
As of 9 June 2026

Most caps in women's association football
Rank	Caps	Player	Nation	Career
1	354	Kristine Lilly	United States	1987–2010
2	331	Christine Sinclair	Canada	2000–2023
3	316	Carli Lloyd	United States	2005–2021
4	311	Christie Pearce	United States	1997–2015
5	276	Mia Hamm	United States	1987–2004
6	274	Julie Foudy	United States	1988–2004
7	255	Abby Wambach	United States	2001–2015
8	248	Sherida Spitse	Netherlands	2006–2025
9	241	Joy Fawcett	United States	1987–2004
10	240	Caroline Seger	Sweden	2005–2023

== Cricket ==
As in association football, cricket still awards a physical cap. Caps are awarded both at international and domestic level, however the criterion for winning a cap differs between international and domestic cricket.

In international cricket, a player is awarded a cap for every appearance made. It is common for a player to be presented with their cap in a ceremony on the first morning of their maiden Test match, although a physical cap may not be presented for every occasion on which a player represents his country. International caps are numbered according to the number of players who have represented the country before. For example, cap number 50 is awarded to the fiftieth player to represent the country.

In some domestic cricket competitions, caps are also awarded. However, they are not awarded automatically for every appearance made, but instead at the discretion of the administrators of the club for whom the recipient plays, and are a one-off recognition that the recipient is now a regular, established player for the club. The most prevalent example of this system is in English county cricket, in which many First Class counties award a "county cap" to players.

As of April 2021, 70 players have won 100 or more caps in Test cricket.

=== Records ===
Players still active at Test level are in bold type.

As of 9 April 2022

Most caps in men's test cricket
Rank	Caps	Name	Country	Career
1	200	Sachin Tendulkar	India	1989–2013
2	188	James Anderson	England	2003–2024
3	168	Ricky Ponting	Australia	1995–2012
3	168	Steve Waugh	Australia	1985–2004
5	166	Jacques Kallis	South Africa; ICC World XI	1995–2013
6	164	Shivnarine Chanderpaul	(Cricket West Indies) West Indies	1994–2015
6	164	Rahul Dravid	India; ICC World XI	1996–2012
8	163	**Joe Root**	England	2012-present
9	161	Alastair Cook	England	2006-2018
10	160	Stuart Broad	England	2007–2023

Notes For South Africa, current cap numbers start from their readmission to Test cricket.

As of 9 April 2022

Most caps in men's one-day international cricket
Rank	Caps	Name	Country	Career
1	463	Sachin Tendulkar	India	1989–2012
2	448	Mahela Jayawardene	Sri Lanka; ACC Asia XI	1998–2015
3	445	Sanath Jayasuriya	Sri Lanka; ACC Asia XI	1989–2011
4	404	Kumar Sangakkara	Sri Lanka; ACC Asia XI; ICC World XI	2000–2015
5	398	Shahid Afridi	Pakistan; ACC Asia XI; ICC World XI	1996–2015
6	378	Inzamam-ul-Haq	Pakistan; ACC Asia XI	1991–2007
7	375	Ricky Ponting	Australia; ICC World XI	1995–2012
8	356	Wasim Akram	Pakistan	1984–2003
9	350	MS Dhoni	India; ACC Asia XI	2004–2019
9	350	Muttiah Muralitharan	Sri Lanka; ACC Asia XI; ICC World XI	1993–2011

== Rugby union ==
In rugby union, 92 players have reached 100 international caps as of 27 October 2023. Players from England, Scotland, Wales and Ireland are eligible for selection to the British & Irish Lions touring squad. Lions matches are classed as full international tests, and caps are awarded. The Pacific Islanders team, composed of players from Fiji, Samoa, Tonga, Niue and Cook Islands have a similar arrangement, although no players involved have so far reached 100 caps (Fijian Nicky Little is closest with 71 caps).

Players still active at Test level are in bold type.

As of 21 July 2025

Most caps in men's rugby union
Rank	Caps	Name	Country	Career
1	170	Alun Wyn Jones	Wales; British & Irish Lions	2006–2023
2	153	Sam Whitelock	New Zealand	2010–2023
3	151	James Slipper	Australia	2010–2025
4	148	Richie McCaw	New Zealand	2001-2015
5	144	**Beauden Barrett**	New Zealand	2012-present
6	142	Sergio Parisse	Italy	2002-2019
7	141	**Eben Etzebeth**	South Africa	2012-present
7	141	Brian O'Driscoll	Ireland; British & Irish Lions	1999-2014
9	139	George Gregan	Australia	1994-2007
10	137	Cian Healy	Ireland	2009–2018

== Rugby league ==
The International Rugby League (IRL, formerly the Rugby League International Federation (RLIF)) honours players that have made 50 international appearances in their career with a special golden cap. The record for most Full International appearances is held by former Australian Kangaroos player and captain Darren Lockyer with 63 matches, which includes four for the Australian Super League side, which is officially recognised by IRL and their official statistics provider, the Rugby League Record Keepers’ Club.

IRL, through its History and Heritage Group, conducted a comprehensive review of international games to establish a definitive list of Senior International Matches (SIMs, commonly referred to as ‘Full Internationals’). This was required due to differences in what individual national governing bodies recognised as matches eligible for caps and to ensure a common basis for official IRL records. IRL consciously avoid the term ‘Tests’ when referring to international games, due to different uses of the term between nations and through history. Many games that are universally acceptable as Full Internationals, such as those between England, Wales and France in the European Championship, were not considered Test matches at the time, and rather than re-label matches retrospectively, or have different tiers of international competition, the decision was made to use one consistent term to recognise all SIMs as equal.

The below list is aligned to IRL's official record, and therefore refers to the most Full International appearances, rather than caps. National governing bodies remain free to cap whichever games they wish, and whilst most now only award them for matches that IRL recognise as a SIM, this is not universally the case (especially among emerging nations) and there remain historical anomalies. Players still active at international level are in bold type.

As of 12 November 2026

Most Full International appearances in men's rugby league
Rank	Caps	Name	Country	Career
1	63	Darren Lockyer	Australia	1997–2011
2	60	Jim Sullivan	Wales (United Kingdom) Great Britain; Other Nationalities	1921–1939
3	57	Ruben Wiki	New Zealand, New Zealand Māori	1992–2006
4	56	Cameron Smith	Australia	2006–2017
5	53	Adrian Morley	(United Kingdom) Great Britain; England	1996–2012
5	53	James Graham	(United Kingdom) Great Britain; England	2006–2019
7	51	Mick Sullivan	(United Kingdom) Great Britain; England	1954–1963
7	51	Petero Civoniceva	Australia; Fiji	2001–2014
7	51	Adam Blair	New Zealand	2006–2019
10	49	Garry Schofield	(United Kingdom) Great Britain; England	1984–1995

Most caps in wheelchair rugby league
Rank	Caps	Name	Country	Career
1	**51**	**Jodie Boyd-Ward**	Wales; England; Ireland	2012-2026

== Netball ==
As of 4 March 2026
Rank	Caps	Name	Country	Career
1	217	Irene van Dyk	South Africa (72); New Zealand (145)	1994–2014
2	214	Jade Clarke	England	2002–2023
3	203	Latonia Blackman	Barbados	1998–2025
4	200+	Mary Waya	Malawi	1984–2014
5	175	Geva Mentor	England	2001–2023
6	171	Bongiwe Msomi	South Africa	2011–2023
7	165	Laura Langman	New Zealand	2003–2020
8	159	Nadine Bryan	Jamaica	1997–2014
9	150+	Rhonda John-Davis	Trinidad and Tobago	1999–2019
10	150	Maria Folau	New Zealand	2005–2019

== See also ==
- Baseball cap
