= Monde Zondeki =

South African cricketer (born 1982)

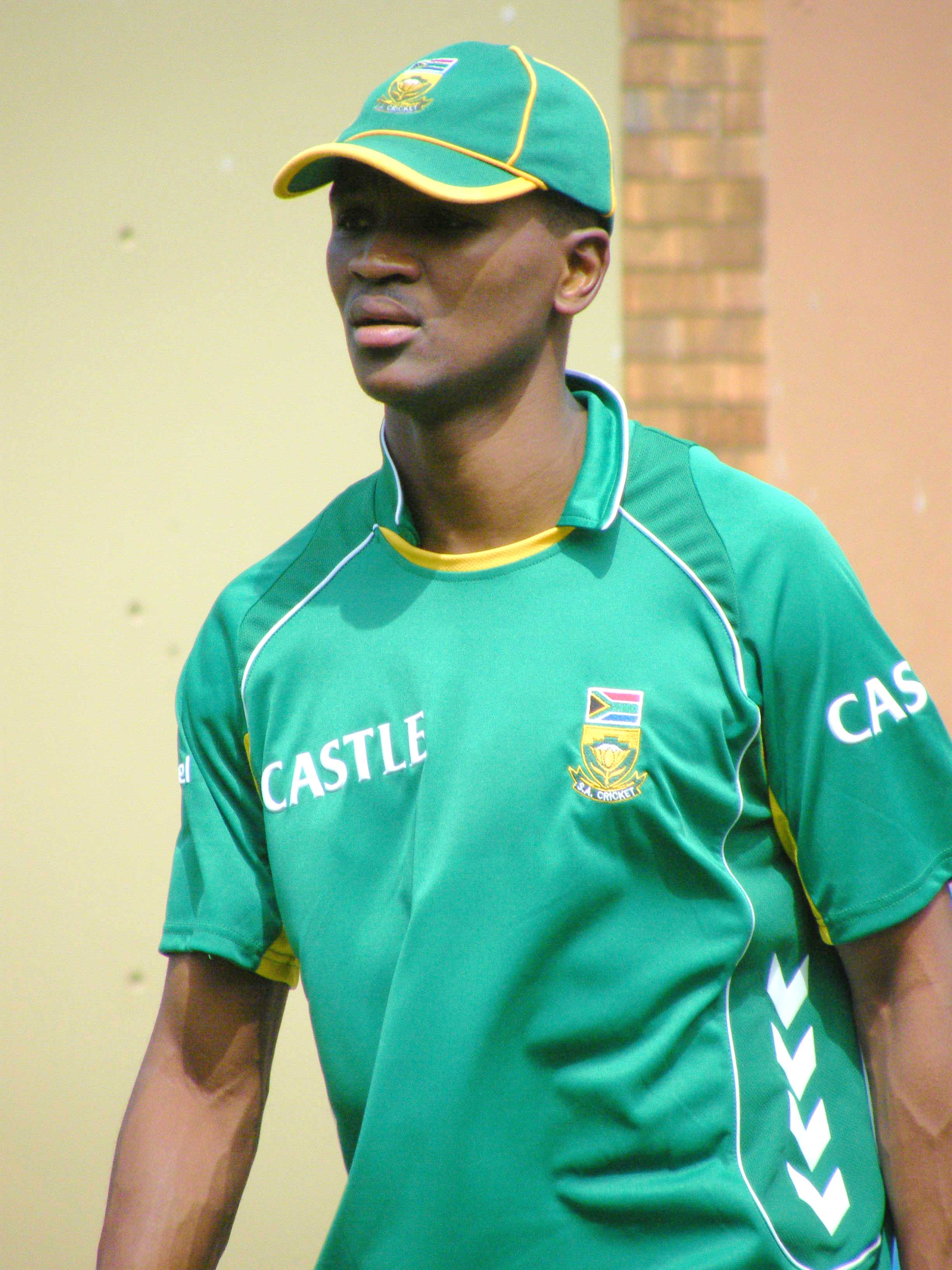

Personal information
- Born: 25 July 1982 (age 44); King William's Town, Cape Province, South Africa
- Batting: Right-handed
- Bowling: Right-arm fast

International information
- National side: South Africa (2002–2008)
- Test debut (cap 292): 21 August 2003 v England
- Last Test: 26 November 2008 v Bangladesh
- ODI debut (cap 73): 6 December 2002 v Sri Lanka
- Last ODI: 2 November 2008 v Kenya
- Only T20I (cap 16): 9 January 2006 v Australia

Domestic team information
- Years: Team
- 2000–2004: Border
- 2004: Eastern Cape
- 2005: Warriors
- 2005–: Cape Cobras
- 2008: Warwickshire
- 2009–2010: Western Province

Career statistics
Competition	Test	ODI
Matches	5	11
Runs scored	82	4
Batting average	20.50	4.00
100s/50s	0/1	0/0
Top score	59	3*
Balls bowled	692	456
Wickets	16	8
Bowling average	27.37	51.75
5 wickets in innings	1	0
10 wickets in match	0	0
Best bowling	6/39	2/46
Catches/stumpings	1/–	3/–
- Source: Cricinfo, 14 February 2006

Monde Zondeki (born 25 July 1982) is a South African international cricketer who has played in five Test matches and ten One Day Internationals and he is nephew to Pamela Tshwete. He currently represents the Cape Cobras and Western Province in first-class cricket.

In his debut Test match against England in 2003, Zondeki's bowling was limited due to injury. However, he made a significant contribution with the bat, scoring 59 runs in the first innings. He also partnered with Gary Kirsten for a crucial eighth-wicket stand of 150 runs, rescuing South Africa from a precarious position of 142 for 7. In his second Test against Zimbabwe in 2004–05, Zondeki took impressive figures of 3 for 66 and 6 for 39, helping South Africa secure an innings victory and earning him the player of the match award.

During the 2007-08 South African season, Zondeki emerged as the leading wicket-taker, capturing 62 wickets at an average of 19.17. He represented Warwickshire during the early weeks of the 2008 season, where he was coached by former South African fast bowler Allan Donald. Although he took 4 for 95 in a County Championship match, his spell at Edgbaston was not successful, with 9 wickets at 42.33 in four Championship matches and 1 for 158 in four List A matches.
