= ACC Asia XI cricket team =

ACC Asia XI
International Cricket Council
- ICC status: None (None)
- ICC region: Asia

International cricket
- First international: 10 January 2005 vs. ICC World XI at Melbourne Cricket Ground, Melbourne
- As of September 6, 2014

ACC Asian XI cricket team was a team that took part in World Cricket Tsunami Appeal and Afro-Asia Cup. The ACC Asian XI played their first in a one-off match the 2005 World Cricket Tsunami Appeal which was designed to raise funds for charities following the 2004 Indian Ocean earthquake and resulting tsunami. As of now, Asia XI had played 7 matches, the Asian XI have won 4 of them.

The team also competed in an Afro-Asia Cup against an Africa XI which was designed as a fund-raiser for the African Cricket Association and the Asian Cricket Council. The Afro-Asian Cup debuted in 2005 and the second tournament was played in 2007.

== History ==
=== 1999/00 ICC Cricket Week ===
Asia XI and Rest of the world XI played a one Match series on 8 April 2000 as a part of 1999/00 ICC Cricket Week.

==== Squad ====
Asia XI
Player	Nationality
Wasim Akram (c)	Pakistan
Sanath Jayasuriya	Sri Lanka
Sachin Tendulkar	India
Sourav Ganguly	India
Aravinda de Silva	Sri Lanka
Ajay Jadeja	India
Abdul Razzaq	Pakistan
Moin Khan (wk)	Pakistan
Anil Kumble	India
Chaminda Vaas	Sri Lanka
Muttiah Muralitharan	Sri Lanka
Robin Singh (12th Man/Reserve)	India
Shoaib Akhtar	Pakistan
Saeed Anwar	Pakistan
Duleep Mendis (Coach/Manager)	Sri Lanka

==== Scorecard ====
8 April 2000 (D/N)
scorecard

Asia XI; 320/9 (50 overs)	v	Rest of the World XI; 319/8 (50 overs)
(India) Sachin Tendulkar 80 (77) (South Africa) Nantie Hayward 3/39 (7 overs)		(Australia) Michael Bevan 185* (132) (Sri Lanka) Muttiah Muralitharan 2/45 (9 overs)

Asia XI won by 1 run
Bangabandhu National Stadium, Dhaka, Bangladesh
Attendance: 36,000
Umpires: (India) Srinivas Venkataraghavan and (Australia) Dave Orchard
Player of the match: (Australia) Michael Bevan (Rest of the World XI)

- Asia XI won the toss and elected to bat

=== Tsunami Appeal Match ===
Their first match resulted in a heavy 112 run loss to the World XI in the Tsunami Appeal match at Melbourne Cricket Ground. Travelex sponsored the first match, which was a 78,000 sell-out, for A$1 million. Two C-130H Hercules aircraft, similar to those used by the Royal Australian Air Force to carry supplies to regions devastated by the massive earthquake and resulting tsunamis, flew over the MCG during the break between innings.

The first ODI, which the World XI won by 112 runs, raised approximately A$17 million, while original estimations suggested only A$5 million would be raised from the Australians. The games were designated as One Day Internationals by the ICC, the first time a game between teams not representing separate cricketing nations was so designated. This designation attracted criticism from cricket statisticians.

==== Squad ====
Asia XI
Player	Nationality
Sourav Ganguly (c)	India
Abdul Razzaq	Pakistan
Rahul Dravid	India
Sanath Jayasuriya	Sri Lanka
Alok Kapali	Bangladesh
Zaheer Khan	India
Anil Kumble	India
Muttiah Muralitharan	Sri Lanka
Kumar Sangakkara (wk)	Sri Lanka
Virender Sehwag	India
Sachin Tendulkar	India
Chaminda Vaas	Sri Lanka
Mohammad Yousuf	Pakistan
Bob Woolmer (Coach/Manager)	South Africa

==== Scorecard ====
10 January 2005
14:15 UTC+11 (D/N)
Scorecard

ICC World XI; 344/8 (50 overs)	v	Asia XI; 232 (39.5 overs)
(Australia) Ricky Ponting 115 (102) (Sri Lanka) Muttiah Muralitharan 3/59 (10 overs)		(India) Rahul Dravid 75* (71) (New Zealand) Daniel Vettori 3/58 (10 overs)

ICC World XI won by 112 runs
Melbourne Cricket Ground, Melbourne, Australia
Attendance: 70,101
Umpires: (New Zealand) Billy Bowden and (South Africa) Rudi Koertzen
Player of the match: (Australia) Ricky Ponting (World XI)

- ICC World IX won the toss and elected to bat

=== 2005 Afro-Asia Cup ===
Afro-Asia Cup was an idea to raise money for the Asian Cricket Council and the African Cricket Association and the whole venture was given a massive boost when the ICC somewhat controversially agreed to give the series of one-day matches full ODI status.

They went on to lose the opening match of the 2005 Afro-Asian Cup by two runs to the African XI. They bounced back and won the next match, however, including half centuries for each of the Sri Lankan pair Kumar Sangakkara and Mahela Jayawardene. During the deciding match, the Asian XI bowled the African XI out for 106, but soon after starting their batting performance rain fell and the game was called off: the trophy was shared.

==== Squad ====
Asian XI
Player	Nationality
Inzamam-ul-Haq (c)	Pakistan
Kumar Sangakkara (wk)	Sri Lanka
Abdul Razzaq	Pakistan
Anil Kumble	India
Ashish Nehra	India
Chaminda Vaas	Sri Lanka
Irfan Pathan	India
Mahela Jayawardene	Sri Lanka
Mashrafe Mortaza	Bangladesh
Mohammad Ashraful	Bangladesh
Muttiah Muralitharan	Sri Lanka
Naved-ul-Hasan	Pakistan
Rahul Dravid	India
Sanath Jayasuriya	Sri Lanka
Shahid Afridi	Pakistan
Shoaib Akhtar	Pakistan
Virender Sehwag	India
Yousuf Youhana	Pakistan
Zaheer Khan	India
Khaled Mashud (Reserve players)	Bangladesh
Marvan Atapattu (Reserve players)	Sri Lanka

=== 2007 Afro-Asia Cup ===
In the 2007 competition, the Asian XI recorded a 3–0 whitewash of the Africans – winning the first two matches by 34 and 31 runs (respectively), the latter helped by Dilhara Fernando recording ODI career best bowling figures of 4/36. In the final match, the Asians fell to 72/5, but following centuries from Mahela Jayawardene (107) and Mahendra Singh Dhoni (139*) – the latter being the highest individual score ever recorded in an Afro-Asia Cup match – they posted a score of 331/8. Despite half-centuries from three of the African batsmen, however, the Asian XI won by 13 runs.

Mahela Jayawardene is the highest run-scorer of the Asian XI in the Afro-Asia Cup, with two half-centuries and a century to his name, second to Shaun Pollock, and was named Man of the Series for the 2007 competition. Zaheer Khan tops the list for most wickets with 11.

==== Squad ====
Asia XI
Player	Nationality
Mahela Jayawardene (c)	Sri Lanka
Mahendra Singh Dhoni (wk)	India
Dilhara Fernando	Sri Lanka
Sourav Ganguly	India
Harbhajan Singh	India
Sanath Jayasuriya	Sri Lanka
Zaheer Khan	India
Mashrafe Mortaza	Bangladesh
Mohammad Asif	Pakistan
Mohammad Rafique	Bangladesh
Mohammad Yousuf	Pakistan
Virender Sehwag	India
Rohit Sharma	India
Yuvraj Singh	India
Lasith Malinga	Sri Lanka
Shoaib Akhtar	Pakistan
Sachin Tendulkar	India
Chaminda Vaas	Sri Lanka
Upul Tharanga	Sri Lanka

== See also ==
- List of Asia XI ODI cricketers
- List of Asia XI Twenty20 International cricketers
- Category:Multi-national teams in international cricket
