= New Zealand cricket team in South Africa in 2005–06 =

	New Zealand	South Africa
- Dates: 21 October 2005 – 7 May 2006
Captains	Stephen Fleming	Graeme Smith

Test series
- Result: South Africa won the 3-match series 2–0
Most runs	Stephen Fleming (351)	Hashim Amla (233)
Most wickets	James Franklin (15)	Makhaya Ntini (20)
- Player of the series: Makhaya Ntini (SA)

One Day International series
- Results: South Africa won the 5-match series 4–0
Most runs	Lou Vincent (167)	Graeme Smith (161)
Most wickets	Shane Bond (6)	Makhaya Ntini (8)
- Player of the series: Justin Kemp (SA)

Twenty20 International series
- Results: New Zealand won the 1-match series 1–0
Most runs	Stephen Fleming (31)	Graeme Smith (61)
Most wickets	Nathan Astle (3); Jeetan Patel (3)	Charl Langeveldt (2)

The New Zealand cricket team toured South Africa for cricket matches in the 2005–06 season. Owing to South Africa's busy schedule, the tour was split into two legs, one to be played in October 2005 with the six limited overs matches (one Twenty20 International and five One Day Internationals), and the second leg to be played in April and May 2006, including three Test matches. Before the limited overs series began, New Zealand were ranked third on the ICC ODI Championship table, two places ahead of their hosts South Africa. However, New Zealand had never won an ODI series in South Africa before this tour, and they were not to do it this summer either. In fact, New Zealand did not win a single one of the five matches, and only the rain – which sent the fourth match into a no-result – prevented the Kiwis from going down 0–5. The test series was similarly disappointing for New Zealand, with South Africa claiming it 2-0. After two series losses to Australia it was a satisfying result for the South Africans.

== Squads ==
T20I		ODIs		Tests	
South Africa	New Zealand	South Africa	New Zealand	South Africa	New Zealand
Graeme Smith (c); Jacques Kallis; Nicky Boje; Mark Boucher (wk); AB de Villiers; Boeta Dippenaar; Herschelle Gibbs; Andrew Hall; Justin Kemp; Charl Langeveldt; Albie Morkel; André Nel; Makhaya Ntini; Shaun Pollock; Ashwell Prince	Stephen Fleming (c); Daniel Vettori (c); Andre Adams; Nathan Astle; Shane Bond; James Franklin; Hamish Marshall; James Marshall; Brendon McCullum (wk); Craig McMillan; Kyle Mills; Jacob Oram; Jeetan Patel; Scott Styris; Lou Vincent	Graeme Smith (c); Jacques Kallis; Nicky Boje; Mark Boucher (wk); AB de Villiers; Boeta Dippenaar; Herschelle Gibbs; Andrew Hall; Justin Kemp; Charl Langeveldt; Albie Morkel; André Nel; Makhaya Ntini; Shaun Pollock; Ashwell Prince; Andrew Puttick; Jacques Rudolph	Stephen Fleming (c); Daniel Vettori (vc); Andre Adams; Nathan Astle; Shane Bond; James Franklin; Hamish Marshall; James Marshall; Brendon McCullum (wk); Craig McMillan; Kyle Mills; Jacob Oram; Jeetan Patel; Scott Styris; Lou Vincent	Graeme Smith; Hashim Amla; Mark Boucher (wk); Nicky Boje; AB de Villiers; Boeta Dippenaar; Herschelle Gibbs; Andrew Hall; Jacques Kallis; Garnett Kruger; André Nel; Makhaya Ntini; Shaun Pollock; Ashwell Prince; Jacques Rudolph; Dale Steyn	Stephen Fleming (c); Daniel Vettori; Nathan Astle; Shane Bond; Peter Fulton; James Franklin; Jamie How; Hamish Marshall; Brendon McCullum (wk); Chris Martin; Kyle Mills; Jacob Oram; Michael Papps; Jeetan Patel; Scott Styris

The New Zealand squad of 15 players for the ODI series of the tour was announced on 26 September 2005. Chris Cairns was excluded over fitness issues while Jeetan Patel was included following good performances during the Zimbabwe tour the previous season. From the ODI squad that toured the Caribbean earlier that year, the South Africa squad had Herschelle Gibbs included for the First ODI, who was out due to injury, in place of Justin Ontong. Albie Morkel was drafted only for the T20I fixture in the same squad. AB de Villiers, who was named in squads for both ODI and T20I series, was released to play domestic cricket for his side, the Titans, thus missing the lone T20I and the First ODI fixtures, as part of the player-rotation policy employed by the selectors. While he returned to the squad for the Second ODI, Andrew Hall left to play domestic cricket. Boeta Dippenaar, who picked up an injury during the First ODI, was ruled out of the remainder of the series and was replaced by Andrew Puttick. Puttick was replaced by Jacques Rudolph for the Third ODI. In their 13-man squad announced for the final two ODIs, Gibbs and Nicky Boje, who announced dropping out of the India tour, were replaced by Hall and Morkel for South Africa.

The New Zealand squad for the Test series was announced on 28 March 2006. Two additions were made to the squad that was playing the West Indies. Opening batsman Michael Papps was recalled to the side alongside all-rounder Jacob Oram. Shane Bond was ruled of the First Test after he sustained a knee injury in the four-day warm-up game. Kyle Mills was named his replacement in the playing XI. For the Second Test, Michael Mason was added to the squad his cover. While Bond was ruled out for the series, Hamish Marshall pulled out due to a rib injury following the First Test.

A 16-man South Africa squad for the Test was announced on 9 April. The same squad named for the completed home series against Australia was named. Gibbs and Kruger were dropped from the squad for the Second and Tests after poor performances in the First.

== Tour matches ==
=== 50-over: South Africa A v New Zealanders ===
14 October 2005 (D/N)
Scorecard

New Zealanders; 273/9 (50 overs)	v	South Africa A 199/4 (43 overs)
Craig McMillan 105 (106); Tyron Henderson 5/38 (10 overs)		Jacques Rudolph 73* (88); James Franklin 1/11 (5 overs)

New Zealanders won by 19 runs (D/L method)
Willowmoore Park, Benoni
Umpires: Ian Howell and Brian Jerling
Player of the match: Craig McMillan (New Zealanders)

- New Zealanders won the toss and elected to bat.

=== 50-over: South Africa A v New Zealanders ===
16 October 2005
Scorecard

New Zealanders; 231/9 (50 overs)	v	South Africa A 128 (33.5 overs)
Stephen Fleming 100 (115); Johan van der Wath 4/31 (10 overs)		Justin Ontong 37 (72); Shane Bond 5/37 (5.5 overs)

New Zealanders won by 103 runs
Sedgars Park, Potchefstroom
Umpires: Ian Howell and Brian Jerling
Player of the match: Stephen Fleming (New Zealanders)

- South Africa A won the toss and elected to field.

=== Four-day: Rest of South Africa v New Zealanders ===
7–10 April 2006
Scorecard

Rest of South Africa	v	New Zealanders
395 (117 overs); Neil McKenzie 141 (278); James Franklin 4/80 (24 overs)		372 (80.1 overs); Stephen Fleming 118 (132); Monde Zondeki 4/107 (23 overs)
270/8 (86.2 overs); Justin Ontong 144* (239); Daniel Vettori 3/77 (29 overs)

Match drawn
Willowmoore Park, Benoni
Umpires: Karl Hurter and Brian Jerling

- Rest of South Africa won the toss and elected to bat.
- James Franklin claimed his 250th wicket in first-class matches.

== T20I series ==
=== Only T20I ===
21 October 2005 (D/N)
Scorecard

South Africa; 133 (19.3 overs)	v	New Zealand; 134/5 (18 overs)
Graeme Smith 61 (43); Nathan Astle 3/20 (4 overs); Jeetan Patel 3/20 (4 overs)		Stephen Fleming 31 (25); Charl Langeveldt 2/14 (2 overs)

New Zealand won by 5 wickets
Wanderers, Johannesburg
Umpires: Ian Howell (SA) and Brian Jerling (SA)
Player of the match: Jeetan Patel (NZ)

- New Zealand won the toss and elected to field.
- Nathan Astle, Shane Bond, James Marshall, Jacob Oram and Jeetan Patel (all NZ); and Nicky Boje, Mark Boucher, Herschelle Gibbs, Jacques Kallis, Justin Kemp, Charl Langeveldt, Albie Morkel, André Nel, Makhaya Ntini, Shaun Pollock, Ashwell Prince and Graeme Smith (all SA) made their T20I debut.

== ODI series ==
=== First ODI ===
23 October 2005
Scorecard

New Zealand; 249/8 (50 overs)	v	South Africa; 250/8 (49.3 overs)
Craig McMillan 66 (75); André Nel 3/42 (9 overs)		Justin Kemp 73 (64); Jeetan Patel 2/48 (8 overs)

South Africa won by 2 wickets
Goodyear Park, Bloemfontein
Umpires: Steve Bucknor (WI) and Ian Howell (SA)
Player of the match: Justin Kemp (SA)

- New Zealand won the toss and elected to bat.
- Jacques Kallis became the third South Africa player to claim 200 wickets in ODIs.

=== Second ODI ===
28 October 2005 (D/N)
Scorecard

South Africa; 201/9 (50 overs)	v	New Zealand; 182 (47.5 overs)
Mark Boucher 40 (47); Kyle Mills 4/44 (10 overs)		Lou Vincent 90 (109); Makhaya Ntini 3/29 (10 overs)

South Africa won by 19 runs
Newlands, Cape Town
Umpires: Steve Bucknor (WI) and Ian Howell (SA)
Player of the match: Lou Vincent (NZ)

- South Africa won the toss and elected to bat.
- Andrew Puttick (SA) made his ODI debut.

=== Third ODI ===
30 October 2005
Scorecard

New Zealand; 243/9 (50 overs)	v	South Africa; 245/6 (49.2 overs)
Scott Styris 78 (102); Makhaya Ntini 3/37 (10 overs)		Herschelle Gibbs 81 (94); Andre Adams 2/40 (10 overs)

South Africa won by 4 wickets
St George's Park, Port Elizabeth
Umpires: Steve Bucknor (WI) and Brian Jerling (SA)
Player of the match: Herschelle Gibbs (SA)

- South Africa won the toss and elected to field.

=== Fourth ODI ===
4 November 2005 (D/N)
Scorecard

South Africa; 79/2 (20 overs)	v	New Zealand
Jacques Kallis 24* (43); James Franklin 1/18 (5 overs)

No result
Kingsmead, Durban
Umpires: Steve Bucknor (WI) and Brian Jerling (SA)

- South Africa won the toss and elected to bat.
- Rain stopped play at 14:00, 90 minutes into South Africa's innings.
- Nathan Astle (NZ) became the fourth player to play 200 ODIs for New Zealand.

=== Fifth ODI ===
6 November 2005
Scorecard

New Zealand; 215 (49.3 overs)	v	South Africa; 140/5 (28.1 overs)
Lou Vincent 66 (76); Andrew Hall 4/23 (10 overs)		Graeme Smith 66 (65); Daniel Vettori 2/18 (5 overs)

South Africa won by 5 wickets (D/L method)
SuperSport Park, Centurion
Umpires: Steve Bucknor (WI) and Brian Jerling (SA)
Player of the match: Andrew Hall (SA)

- South Africa won the toss and elected to field.
- South Africa were set a target of 140 in 30 overs after interruptions due to thunderstorms.
- Mark Boucher became the fourth South Africa player to play 200 ODIs.
- Mark Boucher claimed five catches, equalling the record for most in an ODI by a South Africa wicket-keeper. He broke the record in 2007 when he claimed six against Pakistan.

== Test series ==
=== First Test ===
15–19 April 2006
Scorecard

South Africa	v	New Zealand
276 (95.4 overs); Boeta Dippenaar 52 (96); Kyle Mills 4/43 (18 overs)		327 (71.4 overs); Jacob Oram 133 (169); Makhaya Ntini 5/94 (19 overs)
299 (98.1 overs); AB de Villiers 97 (161); Daniel Vettori 2/42 (15.1 overs)		120 (36 overs); Daniel Vettori 38 (48); Dale Steyn 5/47 (17 overs)

South Africa won by 128 runs
Centurion Park, Centurion, South Africa
Umpires: Mark Benson (Eng) and Daryl Harper (Aus)
Player of the match: Makhaya Ntini (SA)

- South Africa won the toss and elected to bat.
- Stephen Fleming (NZ), Jacques Kallis and Shaun Pollock (both SA) all played their 100th Tests.

=== Second Test ===
27 April – 1 May 2006
Scorecard

New Zealand	v	South Africa
593/8d (165 overs); Stephen Fleming 262 (423); Makhaya Ntini 4/162 (43 overs)		512 (188 overs); Hashim Amla 149 (317); James Franklin 3/95 (33 overs)
121/3 (37 overs); Scott Styris 54 (75); Jacques Kallis 1/5 (5 overs)

Match drawn
Newlands Stadium, Cape Town
Umpires: Mark Benson (Eng) and Asoka de Silva (SL)
Player of the match: Stephen Fleming (NZ)

- South Africa won the toss and elected to field.
- Stephen Fleming became the first New Zealand player to score three double centuries in Tests. His 262 was the highest for a New Zealand batsman against South Africa.
- Stephen Fleming and James Franklin put together 256 runs for the eighth wicket, the most for any wicket for New Zealand against South Africa in Tests.
- James Franklin (NZ) and Hashim Amla (SA) scored their maiden Test centuries.
- Jacques Kallis (SA) scored his 8,000th run in Tests.

=== Third Test ===
5–7 May 2006
Scorecard

New Zealand	v	South Africa
119 (44 overs); Stephen Fleming 46 (82); Makhaya Ntini 5/35 (16 overs)		186 (44 overs); Graeme Smith 63 (63); Chris Martin 5/37 (15 overs)
283 (78.5 overs); Daniel Vettori 60 (91); Dale Steyn 4/91 (22 overs)		220/6 (47.3 overs); Graeme Smith 68 (80); James Franklin 3/67 (13.3 overs)

South Africa won by 4 wickets
Wanderers Stadium, Johannesburg
Umpires: Asoka de Silva (SL) and Darrell Hair (Aus)
Player of the match: Graeme Smith (SA)

- South Africa won the toss and elected to field.
- Jacques Kallis (SA) claimed his 200th wicket, and became the second player after Garfield Sobers (WI) to reach 8,000 runs and 200 wickets in Tests.
