= List of cricketers who have played 100 Tests =

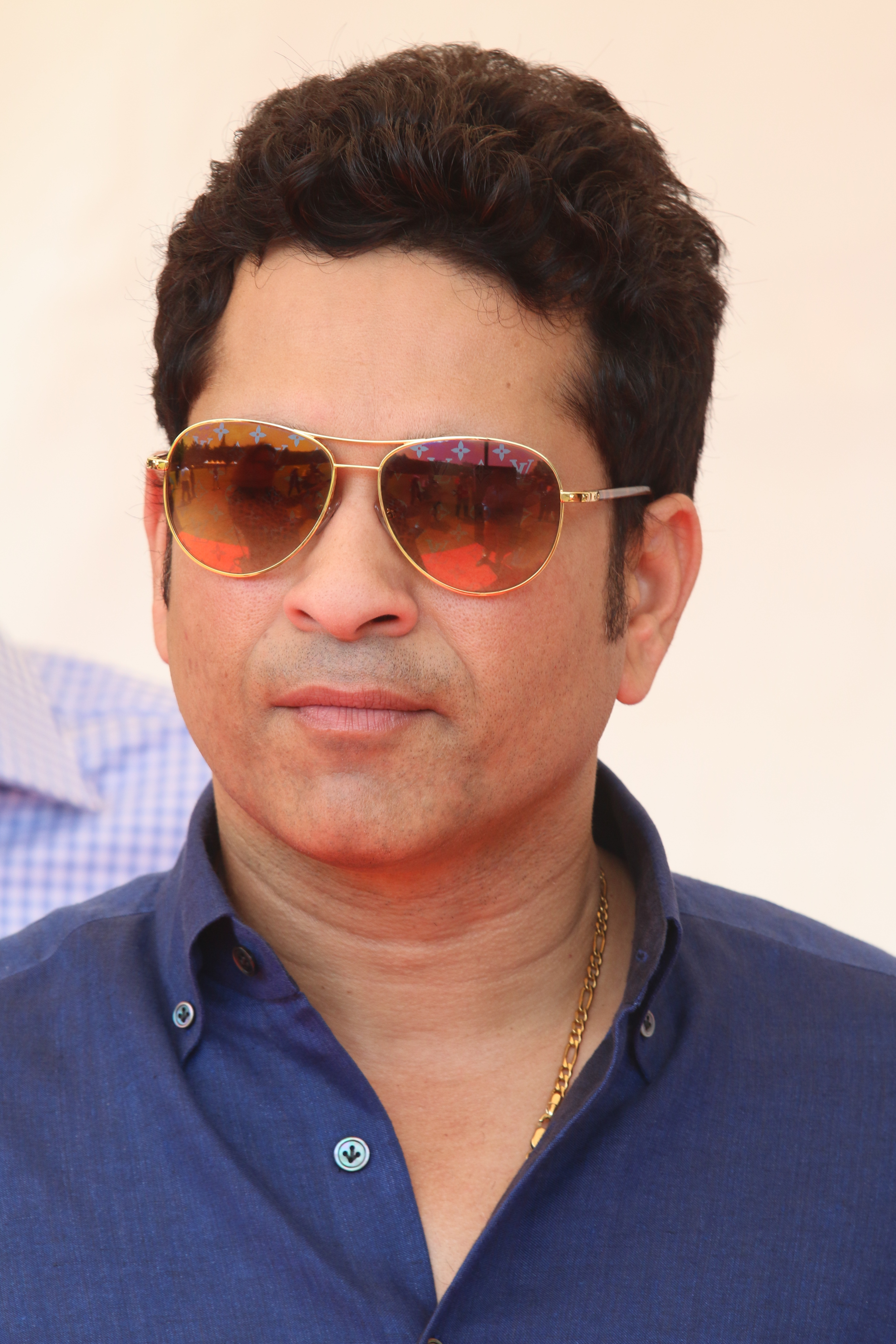
Sachin Tendulkar (pictured) of India has played the most Test matches (200).

In the sport of cricket, playing 100 Test matches is considered to be a significant achievement. Colin Cowdrey of England was the first cricketer to have reached this landmark, celebrating the occasion with a score of 104 runs against Australia in 1968 during the 1968 Ashes series. In February 2021, Joe Root played his 100th Test during England's tour of India, in which he became the quickest player to reach that landmark, and the first to score a double century in their 100th Test.

Sachin Tendulkar of India is the only cricketer to have played in 200 Test matches, a milestone he reached in his final match, on 13 November 2013 against the West Indies, at Mumbai's Wankhede Stadium.

As of August 2026, 84 cricketers have reached this landmark, including 17 from England, the most among all Test-playing teams.

== Players with 100+ Test matches ==
Following is the list of cricketers who have played 100 or more Test matches.

List of cricketers who have played 100 Tests
No.	Player	Date	Team(s)	Span	Total matches	Ref.
1	Colin Cowdrey	11 July 1968	England	1954–1975	114	
2	Geoffrey Boycott	2 July 1981	England	1964–1982	108	
3	Clive Lloyd	28 April 1984	West Indies	1966–1985	110	
4	Sunil Gavaskar	17 October 1984	India	1971–1987	125	
5	David Gower	21 July 1988	England	1978–1992	117	
6	Viv Richards	18 November 1988	West Indies	1974–1991	121	
7	Dilip Vengsarkar	24 November 1988	India	1976–1992	116	
8	Allan Border	24 December 1988	Australia	1978–1994	156	
9	Kapil Dev	15 November 1989	India	1978–1994	131	
10	Javed Miandad	1 December 1989	Pakistan	1976–1993	124	
11	Gordon Greenidge	12 April 1990	West Indies	1974–1991	108	
12	Desmond Haynes	4 July 1991	West Indies	1978–1994	116	
13	Ian Botham	6 February 1992	England	1977–1992	102	
14	Graham Gooch	29 January 1993	England	1975–1995	118	
15	David Boon	21 April 1995	Australia	1984–1996	107	
16	Steve Waugh	2 January 1998	Australia	1985–2004	168	
17	Ian Healy	30 January 1998	Australia	1988–1999	119	
18	Courtney Walsh	27 February 1998	West Indies	1984–2001	132	
19	Mark Taylor	20 November 1998	Australia	1989–1999	104	
20	Saleem Malik	10 December 1998	Pakistan	1982–1999	103	
21	Mark Waugh	2 January 2000	Australia	1991–2002	128	
22	Alec Stewart	3 August 2000	England	1990–2003	133	
23	Michael Atherton	3 August 2000	England	1989–2001	115	
24	Wasim Akram	29 November 2000	Pakistan	1985–2002	104	
25	Shane Warne	8 March 2002	Australia	1992–2007	145	
26	Sachin Tendulkar	5 September 2002	India	1989–2013	200	
27	Carl Hooper	9 October 2002	West Indies	1987–2002	102	
28	Brian Lara	26 December 2003	West Indies / ICC World XI	1990–2006	131	
29	Gary Kirsten	18 March 2004	South Africa	1993–2004	101	
30	Glenn McGrath	26 October 2004	Australia	1993–2007	124	
31	Inzamam-ul-Haq	24 March 2005	Pakistan / ICC World XI	1992–2007	120	
32	Graham Thorpe	3 June 2005	England	1993–2005	100	
33	Sanath Jayasuriya	20 September 2005	Sri Lanka	1991–2007	110	
34	Anil Kumble	18 December 2005	India	1990–2008	132	
35	Ricky Ponting	2 January 2006	Australia	1995–2012	168	
36	Muttiah Muralitharan	28 February 2006	Sri Lanka / ICC World XI	1992–2010	133	
37	Rahul Dravid	18 March 2006	India / ICC World XI	1996–2012	164	
38	Justin Langer	31 March 2006	Australia	1993–2007	105	
39	Jacques Kallis	15 April 2006	South Africa / ICC World XI	1995–2013	166	
40	Shaun Pollock	15 April 2006	South Africa	1995–2008	108	
41	Stephen Fleming	15 April 2006	New Zealand	1994–2008	111	
42	Shivnarine Chanderpaul	19 November 2006	West Indies	1994–2015	164	
43	Mark Boucher	11 January 2007	South Africa / ICC World XI	1997–2012	147	
44	Chaminda Vaas	1 December 2007	Sri Lanka	1994–2009	111	
45	Sourav Ganguly	26 December 2007	India	1996–2008	113	
46	VVS Laxman	6 November 2008	India	1996–2012	134	
47	Matthew Hayden	28 November 2008	Australia	1994–2009	103	
48	Mahela Jayawardene	3 January 2009	Sri Lanka	1997–2014	149	
49	Makhaya Ntini	16 December 2009	South Africa	1998–2009	101	
50	Daniel Vettori	27 March 2010	New Zealand / ICC World XI	1997–2014	113	
51	Kumar Sangakkara	16 September 2011	Sri Lanka	2000–2015	134	
52	Graeme Smith	19 July 2012	South Africa / ICC World XI	2002–2014	117	
53	Andrew Strauss	16 August 2012	England	2004–2012	100	
54	Virender Sehwag	23 November 2012	India / ICC World XI	2001–2013	104	
55	Harbhajan Singh	22 February 2013	India	1998–2015	103	
56	Kevin Pietersen	21 November 2013	England	2005–2014	104	
57	Alastair Cook	13 December 2013	England	2006–2018	161	
58	Michael Clarke	13 December 2013	Australia	2004–2015	115	
59	Chris Gayle	8 June 2014	West Indies	2000–2014	103	
60	Ian Bell	20 June 2014	England	2004–2015	118	
61	James Anderson	13 April 2015	England	2003–2024	188	
62	Younis Khan	25 June 2015	Pakistan	2000–2017	118	
63	AB de Villiers	14 November 2015	South Africa	2004–2018	114	
64	Brendon McCullum	12 February 2016	New Zealand	2004–2016	101	
65	Stuart Broad	9 November 2016	England	2007–2023	167	
66	Hashim Amla	12 January 2017	South Africa	2004–2019	124	
67	Ross Taylor	21 February 2020	New Zealand	2007–2022	112	
68	Nathan Lyon †	15 January 2021	Australia	2011–present	145	
69	Joe Root †	5 February 2021	England	2012–present	169	
70	Ishant Sharma	24 February 2021	India	2007–2021	105	
71	Virat Kohli	4 March 2022	India	2011–2025	123	
72	Angelo Mathews	24 July 2022	Sri Lanka	2009–2025	119	
73	David Warner	26 December 2022	Australia	2011–2024	112	
74	Cheteshwar Pujara	17 February 2023	India	2010–2023	103	
75	Steve Smith †	6 July 2023	Australia	2010–present	127	
76	Ben Stokes	15 February 2024	England	2013–2026	122	
77	Ravichandran Ashwin	7 March 2024	India	2011–2024	106	
78	Jonny Bairstow †	7 March 2024	England	2012–present	100	
79	Kane Williamson	8 March 2024	New Zealand	2010–2026	110	
80	Tim Southee	8 March 2024	New Zealand	2008–2024	107	
81	Dimuth Karunaratne	6 February 2025	Sri Lanka	2012–2025	100	
82	Kraigg Brathwaite †	3 July 2025	West Indies	2011–present	100	
83	Mitchell Starc †	12 July 2025	Australia	2011–present	110	
84	Mushfiqur Rahim †	19 November 2025	Bangladesh	2005–present	106	
Last updated: 27 October 2026

† Still playing

== By teams ==
Team	No. of Players
England	17
Australia	16
India	14
West Indies	10
South Africa	8
Sri Lanka	7
New Zealand	6
Pakistan	5
Bangladesh	1
Total	84
