= South African cricket team in Australia in 2022–23 =

International cricket tour

| | Australia | South Africa |
- Dates: 17 December 2022 – 8 January 2023
| Captains | Pat Cummins | Dean Elgar |

Test series
- Result: Australia won the 3-match series 2–0
| Most runs | Steve Smith (231) | Temba Bavuma (185) |
| Most wickets | Pat Cummins (12) | Kagiso Rabada (11) |
- Player of the series: David Warner (Aus)

The South African national cricket team toured Australia in December 2022 and January 2023 to play three Test matches. The Test matches formed part of the 2021–2023 ICC World Test Championship.

In May 2022, Cricket Australia confirmed the fixtures for the tour, with three-match ODI series was scheduled to be played just after the test series. However, in July 2022, South Africa withdrew from the ODI series, after the fixtures clashed with their new domestic T20 league. The ODI series would have formed part of the inaugural 2020–2023 ICC Cricket World Cup Super League. The Super League points for the three matches were awarded to Australia, subject to approval by ICC. Later, the matches were scratched with the points being awarded to Australia.

The Gabba was sanctioned by the ICC, receiving a "below average" rating and one demerit point from match referee Richie Richardson, after the first Test was over within two days.

== Squads ==
| Australia | South Africa |
|---|---|
| Pat Cummins (c); Steve Smith (vc); Ashton Agar; Scott Boland; Alex Carey (wk); Cameron Green; Marcus Harris; Josh Hazlewood; Travis Head; Usman Khawaja; Marnus Labuschagne; Nathan Lyon; Lance Morris; Michael Neser; Matt Renshaw; Mitchell Starc; David Warner | Dean Elgar (c); Temba Bavuma (vc); Gerald Coetzee; Theunis de Bruyn; Sarel Erwee; Simon Harmer; Marco Jansen; Heinrich Klaasen; Keshav Maharaj; Lungi Ngidi; Anrich Nortje; Kagiso Rabada; ~~Glenton Stuurman~~; Rassie van der Dussen; Kyle Verreynne (wk); Lizaad Williams; Khaya Zondo |

On 22 November 2022, Glenton Stuurman was ruled out of South Africa's Test team due to an injury and was replaced by Lizaad Williams After the first Test, Josh Hazlewood replaced Michael Neser in Australia's squad. After the second test, Ashton Agar and Matt Renshaw replaced Cameron Green and Mitchell Starc as injury replacements. South Africa's Theunis de Bruyn was ruled out of third Test, since he returned home for the birth of his first child.

== Warm-up match ==
9–12 December 2022
Scorecard

| South Africa | v | Cricket Australia XI |
| 347 (97.2 overs); Dean Elgar 109 (186); Matthew Kuhnemann 4/78 (23 overs) | | 226 (72.3 overs); Campbell Kellaway 105* (186); Lungi Ngidi 3/26 (9 overs) |
| 8/304d (93.3 overs); Rassie van der Dussen 95 (184); Blake Edwards 3/45 (16.3 overs) | | 6/184 (58 overs); Peter Handscomb 48 (66); Kagiso Rabada 2/22 (6 overs) |

Match drawn
Allan Border Field, Brisbane
Umpires: Donovan Koch (Aus) and Michael Graham-Smith (Aus)

- South Africa won the toss and elected to bat.

== Test series ==
=== 1st Test ===
17–18 December 2022 (Note: While five days of play were scheduled for each Test, the first Test reached a result in two days and the second test in four days.)
Scorecard

| South Africa | v | Australia |
| 152 (48.2 overs); Kyle Verreynne 64 (96); Nathan Lyon 3/14 (8 overs) | | 218 (50.3 overs); Travis Head 92 (96); Kagiso Rabada 4/76 (8 overs) |
| 99 (37.4 overs); Khaya Zondo 36* (85); Pat Cummins 5/42 (12.4 overs) | | 4/35 (7.5 overs); Steve Smith 6 (5); Kagiso Rabada 4/13 (4 overs) |

Australia won by 6 wickets
The Gabba, Brisbane
Umpires: Chris Gaffaney (NZ) and Rod Tucker (Aus)
Player of the match: Travis Head (Aus)

- Australia won the toss and elected to field.
- Mitchell Starc (Aus) took his 300th Test wicket.
- Travis Head (Aus) completed 2000 Test runs.
- The match was over in two days, only the second time this had happened in Australia (the first was in 1931).
- World Test Championship points: Australia 12, South Africa 0.

=== 2nd Test ===
26–29 December 2022
Scorecard

| South Africa | v | Australia |
| 189 (68.4 overs); Marco Jansen 59 (136); Cameron Green 5/27 (10.4 overs) | | 8/575d (145 overs); David Warner 200 (255); Anrich Nortje 3/92 (25 overs) |
| 204 (68.5 overs); Temba Bavuma 65 (144); Nathan Lyon 3/58 (17 overs) |

Australia won by an innings and 182 runs
Melbourne Cricket Ground, Melbourne
Umpires: Richard Kettleborough (Eng) and Paul Reiffel (Aus)
Player of the match: David Warner (Aus)

- Australia won the toss and elected to field.
- No play was possible after 16:22 on Day 3 due to rain.
- This was the first time Australia and South Africa played each other in a Boxing Day Test since 2008.
- David Warner (Aus) played in his 100th Test. He became the tenth cricketer and second Australian to score a century in his hundredth Test, and the second overall to score a double century. He also became the second cricketer, after Gordon Greenidge, to score a century in both his 100th Test and 100th ODI appearances.
- Cameron Green (Aus) took his maiden five-wicket haul in Test cricket.
- David Warner became the eighth Australian cricketer to complete 8000 runs in Test cricket.
- Alex Carey scored his maiden Test century, becoming only the second wicket-keeper (after Rod Marsh) to score a century at the MCG, and the first Australian wicket-keeper to score a Test century since Brad Haddin in 2013.
- This was Australia's first Test series win against South Africa since 2014 and their first at home since 2005–06.
- World Test Championship points: Australia 12, South Africa 0.

=== 3rd Test ===
4–8 January 2023
Scorecard

| Australia | v | South Africa |
| 4/475d (131 overs); Usman Khawaja 195* (368); Anrich Nortje 2/55 (22 overs) | | 255 (108 overs); Keshav Maharaj 53 (81); Josh Hazlewood 4/48 (23 overs) |
| | | 2/105 (41.5 overs) (f/o); Sarel Erwee 42* (125); Josh Hazlewood 1/9 (5 overs) |

Match drawn
Sydney Cricket Ground, Sydney
Umpires: Chris Gaffaney (NZ) and Paul Reiffel (Aus)
Player of the match: Usman Khawaja

- Australia won the toss and elected to bat.
- No play was possible after 17:07 on Day 1 and on Day 3 due to rain.
- Usman Khawaja (Aus) completed 4000 Test runs.
- Steve Smith moved past Matthew Hayden and Michael Clarke to become the fourth highest Australian Test run-scorer.
- Steve Smith scored his 30th Test century, the equal third most by an Australian.
- World Test Championship points: Australia 4, South Africa 4.

== ODI series ==
South Africa forfeited all three scheduled ODIs in July 2022 in order to accommodate their T20 league tournament, the SA20.

=== 1st ODI ===
12 January 2023

| Australia | v | South Africa |

South Africa Forfeit
Bellerive Oval, Hobart
Umpires: Donovan Koch (Aus) and Rod Tucker (Aus)

=== 2nd ODI ===
14 January 2023

| Australia | v | South Africa |

South Africa Forfeit
Sydney Cricket Ground, Sydney
Umpires: Paul Reiffel (Aus) and Paul Wilson (Aus)

=== 3rd ODI ===
17 January 2023

| Australia | v | South Africa |

South Africa Forfeit
Perth Stadium, Perth
Umpires: Donovan Koch (Aus) and Rod Tucker (Aus)
