= South African cricket team in Australia in 2005–06 =

South Africa in Australia in 2005–06
	South Africa	Australia
- Dates: 5 December 2005 – 14 February 2006
Captains	Graeme Smith	Ricky Ponting

Test series
- Result: Australia won the 3-match series 2–0
Most runs	Herschelle Gibbs (251)	Ricky Ponting (515)
Most wickets	André Nel (14)	Shane Warne (14)
- Player of the series: Ricky Ponting

Twenty20 International series
- Results: Australia won the 1-match series 1–0
Most runs	Mark Boucher (29)	Damien Martyn (96)
Most wickets	Shaun Pollock, Monde Zondeki and Johan Botha (1)	Nathan Bracken, Mick Lewis, James Hopes and Andrew Symonds (2)
- Player of the series: Damien Martyn

The South African cricket team toured Australia for cricket matches during the 2005–06 season. South Africa had already played two One Day International series during this season, beating New Zealand 4–0 at home before travelling to India and drawing the series there 2–2. The team had been playing 14 successive ODIs (tour matches excluded) before arriving in Australia, with their last Test match against West Indies in April and May 2005. South Africa played one first class warm-up match, one three-day warm-up match without first class status, and one one-day match before they embarked on the three-Test series, which began on 16 December and ended on 6 January. They also participated in the 2005–06 VB Series, a three-team one-day tournament, along with Australia and Sri Lanka, where they finished last.

The hosts Australia, meanwhile, came off a win in the Frank Worrell Trophy Test series against West Indies in November, where they won all three matches in the series. They also spent a week in New Zealand playing three ODIs for the Chappell–Hadlee Trophy while South Africa played their first warm-up games; Australia won that trophy after winning two of the three ODIs.

South Africa started with a draw, batting out 126 overs in the fourth innings to draw the match at the WACA, though they finished on a total of five for 287, well short of the winning target of 491. In the second Test match, South Africa trailed by 44 on first innings, but a century from Matthew Hayden took Australia to a lead of 365 before declaring, and Shane Warne took four wickets in the second innings as Australia bowled their way to a 184-run win. South Africa came back to earn a lead of 92 on first innings in the third Test at the SCG, but after 70 fourth-day overs were lost due to rain South Africa declared in the first session of the fifth day to give themselves a chance of victory and a series win. However, Ricky Ponting hit 143 not out to become the first batsman to hit centuries in both innings of his 100th Test, and in the process took Australia past the winning target to secure a 2–0 win.

== Squads ==
South Africa:

- Graeme Smith (c)
- Mark Boucher (wk)
- Nicky Boje
- Johan Botha
- AB de Villiers
- Herschelle Gibbs
- Jacques Kallis
- Justin Kemp
- Garnett Kruger
- Charl Langeveldt
- André Nel
- Makhaya Ntini
- Shaun Pollock
- Ashwell Prince
- Jacques Rudolph

Botha was added for the third Test after Ntini suffered a knee tendon injury in the second.

Australia Test:

- Ricky Ponting (c)
- Adam Gilchrist (wk)
- Nathan Bracken
- Stuart Clark
- Matthew Hayden
- Brad Hodge
- Michael Hussey
- Justin Langer
- Brett Lee
- Glenn McGrath
- Andrew Symonds
- Shane Warne

Langer suffered a hamstring injury before the second Test and Phil Jaques replaced him. Stuart Clark, who had been left out of the team for the first Test, was dropped from the squad for the second and replaced by Stuart MacGill.

== Tour matches ==
=== Western Australia v South Africans, 5 December–7 December ===
Western Australia beat the South Africans by an innings and 48 runs

South Africa began their tour on 5 December, 11 days before the first Test match, with a three-day tour match against Western Australia, who were still without a win in the first class form of the game. However, an elbow injury to Jacques Kallis and a finger injury to Graeme Smith weakened the tourists' batting, and Adam Voges hit 101 for Western Australia, putting on 156 in 43.2 overs with Marcus North. Western Australia were three for 73 at lunch after André Nel, Shaun Pollock and Charl Langeveldt had grabbed a wicket each, but Nel and Langeveldt were both taken for four runs an over, with only Langeveldt getting any further wickets, to end with four for 104. Nicky Boje also got one wicket before Justin Langer declared the innings closed on eight for 391. South Africa added 71 in the first 21 overs, but first class debutant Shawn Gillies, born in Jamaica, then had two wickets in his first over in first class cricket. Cricket Australia's report described Gillies' bowling as "continually troubling the batsmen". Ben Edmondson then took the next three wickets either side of the tea break, and spinner Beau Casson rounded it off with four wickets, leaving South Africa all out for 179. Following on 212 behind, South Africa's batsmen yielded eight catches, with three wickets falling in six overs after lunch on day three, and Ashwell Prince's 49 remained their top score thus far on tour as they were bowled out for 164 in the second innings. Beau Casson took another four-wicket-haul, ending with eight wickets for the match (though number five Justin Kemp was his highest-batting victim), while Steve Magoffin ended with three for 37. Gillies was only called upon to bowl four overs, conceding 17 without taking a wicket, as Western Australia recorded their first first-class win of the season. Graeme Smith, South Africa's captain, claimed that he did not think the result was "a concern", and was confident his side would do "the hard work going into the first Test".

=== Cricket Australia Chairman's XI v South Africans, 9 December ===
South Africans beat Cricket Australia Chairman's XI by eight wickets

=== Western Australia XI v South Africans, 11 December–13 December ===
Western Australia XI drew with South Africans

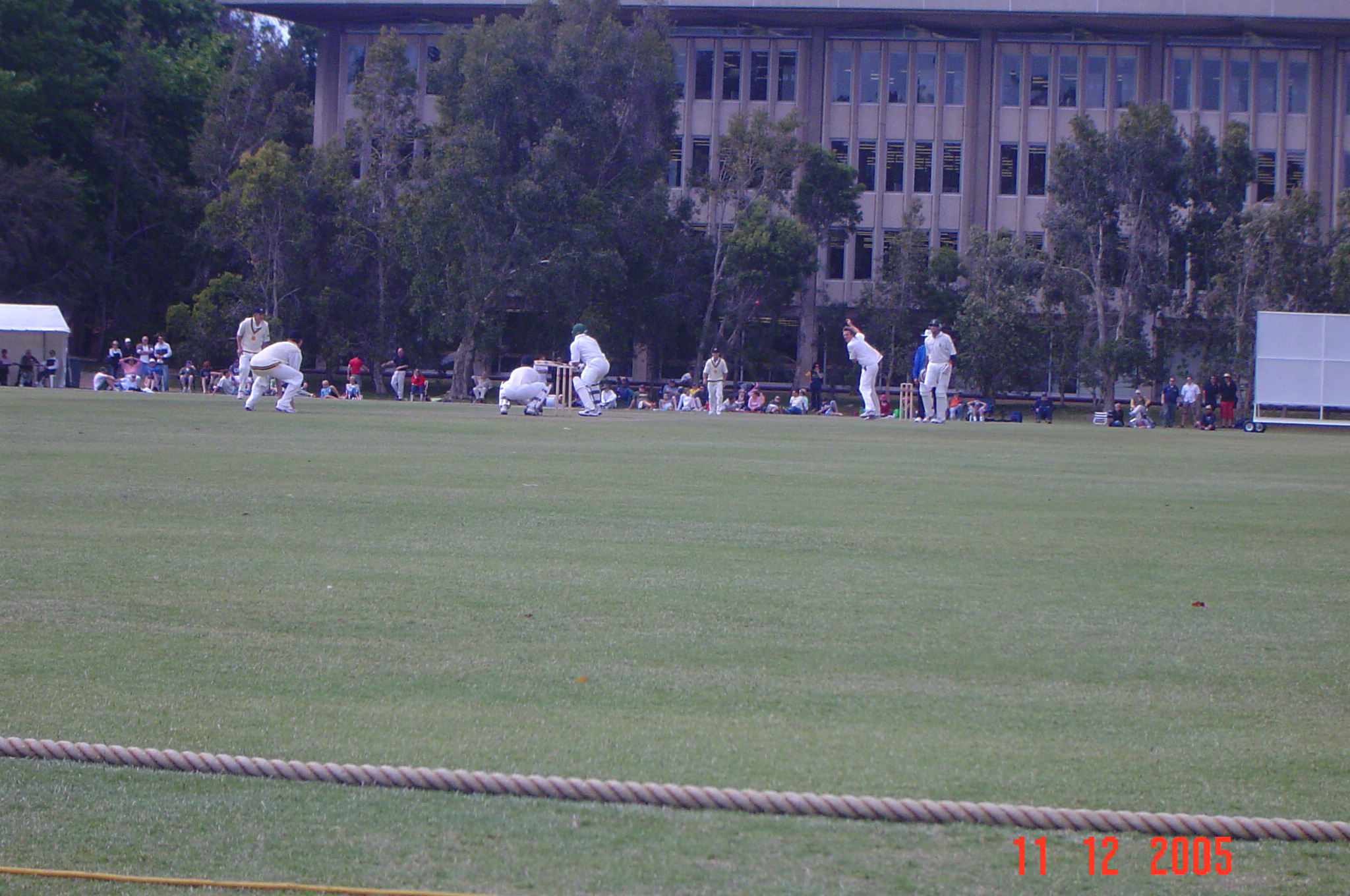
The South Africans taking on Western Australia at University of Western Australia

The third match of the South Africans' tour was also against Western Australia, but this time against a team containing only two of the players they had played the previous week, and none of the players that had players the Warriors' recent Pura Cup game. Yet, the Western Australia team outscored them on first innings after 145 from 20-year-old Luke Pomersbach, which gave them a lead of eight before declaring. Jacques Rudolph then made a double ton for the South Africans, who scored 395 runs despite four wickets from Matthew Petrie, and Western Australia lost one wicket in reply before time ran out and the match ended in a draw.

== Test series ==
=== 1st Test ===
16–20 December 2005
Scorecard

Australia	v	South Africa
258 (75.2 overs); RT Ponting 71 (107); M Ntini 5–64 (19 overs)		296 (81.2 overs); AB de Villiers 68 (109); B Lee 5–93 (22.2 overs)
528/8 dec (146.4 overs); BJ Hodge 203* (332); CK Langeveldt 3–117 (31 overs)		287/5 (126 overs); JA Rudolph 102* (283); SK Warne 3–83 (47 overs)

Match drawn
WACA Ground, Perth, Australia
Umpires: SA Bucknor (WI) and BR Doctrove (WI)
Player of the match: BJ Hodge (AUS)

- Australia won the toss and elected to bat.

After three warm-up matches, with one win, one draw and one loss, the South African team was ready for the top-ranked Australians, though they had to make do without Jacques Kallis. After the early wicket of Matthew Hayden who mis-timed a shot to Jacques Rudolph in the gully on his second ball, Australia batted to lunch with no further loss, and having added 96 in the first 26 overs before lunch they continued with 15 in four overs after it – before Justin Langer top edged a shot to Graeme Smith, and Makhaya Ntini had his second wicket.

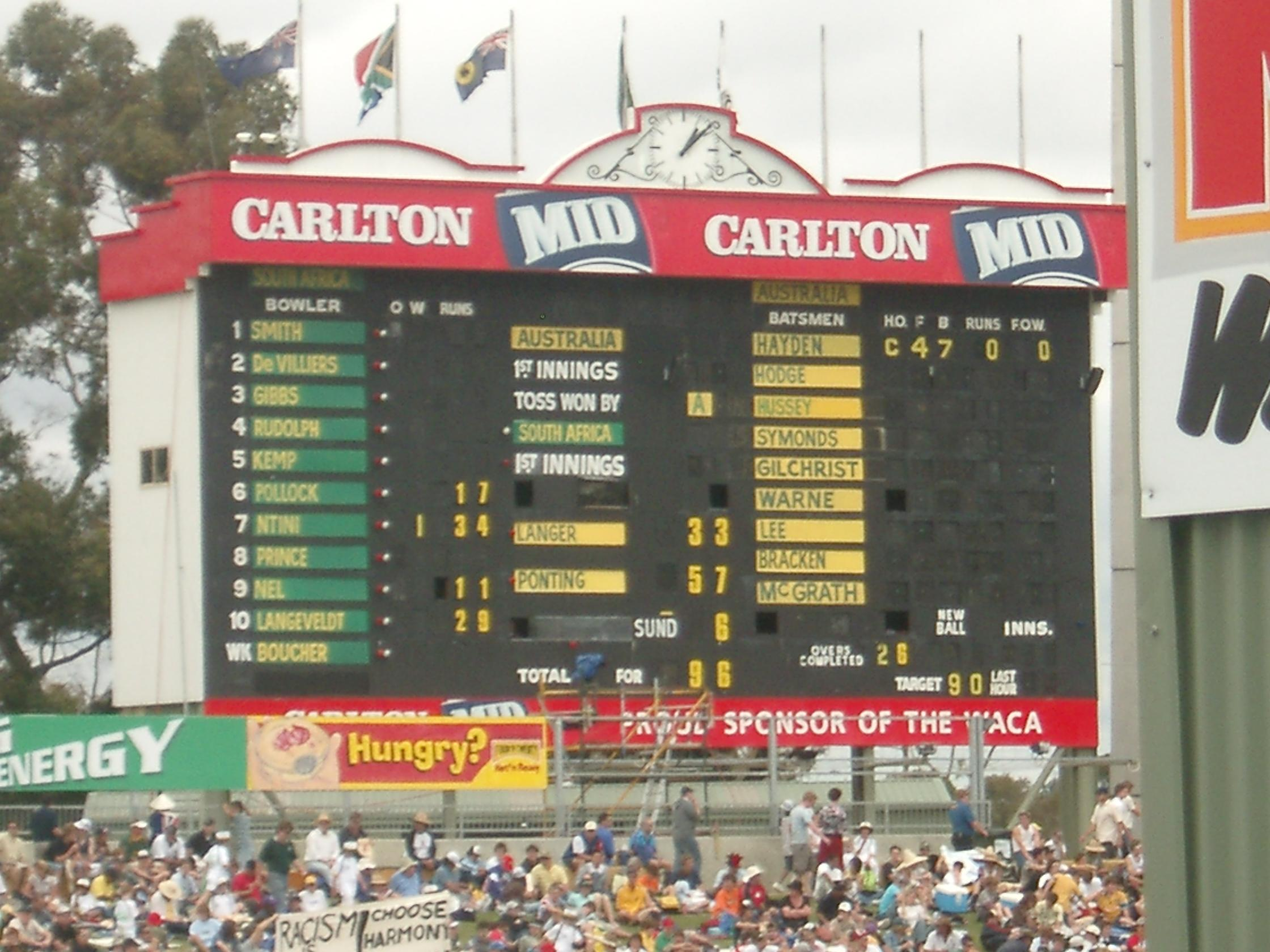
The scoreboard at lunch on day one

He was to get more – after Shaun Pollock had removed Ricky Ponting lbw for 71, Brad Hodge and Mike Hussey batted together until tea, with the score on three for 175. But Ntini took three wickets with thirteen balls, had Hodge, Hussey and Adam Gilchrist all caught, and despite a stand of 33 between Shane Warne and Brett Lee, Australia were bowled out for 258 after André Nel took a brace including Nathan Bracken and Glenn McGrath in the 76th over.

South Africa batted for seven overs before stumps on day one, and Brett Lee was taken out of the attack after two of them, having conceded 15 with two no-balls; he came back to bowl 20.2 overs on the second day, more than any bowler bar Shane Warne, and got five wickets on the day, his sixth career five-wicket-haul. Cricinfo journalist Siddartha Vaidyanathan claimed that the "pendulum [of control in the game] oscillated to and fro" on the second day, as South Africa first cut 55 runs off the target in 12.3 overs, before a wide one from Bracken found the edge of Graeme Smith's bat and went to the hand of Ponting at second slip for 34.

The next 14 overs saw slower scoring, as de Villiers and Gibbs put on 44, before Gibbs inside edged for 21. It was Gibbs' fifth innings at number three in the order, and he has still not passed 50 at this position. None of the following three batsmen in the order managed to pass 30, either, and Jacques Rudolph and Justin Kemp came and went in single figures to see South Africa were six for 185, and still needed 73 for a first-innings lead.

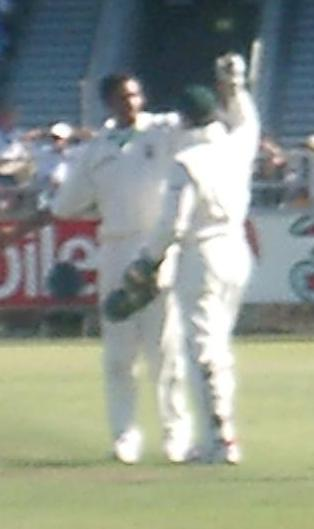
South African bowler Makhaya Ntini (left) celebrates

Those runs were taken by Shaun Pollock and Mark Boucher, who put on 77 together in a stand described as "sizzling" by Vaidyanathan – the two hit six fours in four overs after tea, before Lee returned to have Pollock bowled off the inside edge. Boucher put on 18 in the next half-hour with André Nel, and Makhaya Ntini hit 12 from ten balls as South Africa closed on 296, with a lead of 38. Those runs were exactly matched by Australia, but once again Hayden was dismissed for a sub-25 score, as he top edged to wicket-keeper Boucher for 20. Brett Lee was left as nightwatchman, and Langeveldt bowled a no-ball to level the scores two balls before the end of the day.

Australia's middle order performed much better in the second innings than in the first, however. After Lee had been dismissed for 32, Australia were two for 86, and after Ponting survived a catch off a ball that was incorrectly deemed a no-ball according to TV replays, Ponting made his way to 53, and by tea Australia were four for 185 with Hussey and Hodge at the crease.

Hodge, in his third test, who had contributed with a two-hour 41 in the first innings, survived a dropped catch on 13 – and never looked back. He added an unbroken 126 with Hussey before stumps on day three, made his century off 198 balls on the fourth morning despite Hussey departing in the second over of the day, and took a further 134 balls to make it a double. Ponting then declared, and tea was taken with an Australian total of eight for 528 – which set a target of 491 for South Africa, which would have been a world record chase. With both openers out before the end of the fourth day, South Africa needed a further 406 runs to win for their last eight wickets.

With a victory out of the question, South Africa entered the fifth day with only one objective: survival. The Proteas' remaining eight batsmen would have to bat out ninety overs in over six hours. Gibbs was dismissed 12 overs into the morning session, caught low-down at slip by Warne off the bowling of Brett Lee for 33, and just before the luncheon interval Ashwell Prince was also dismissed after an innings lasting 55 minutes and yielding eight runs. Warne was the perpetrator, and he got his fifth wicket for the match as South Africa went into lunch with the score at four for 140.

However, the afternoon session brought no wickets to Australia, as Jacques Rudolph and Justin Kemp scored 50 runs in a session lasting 28 overs. Rudolph, Kallis' replacement, bought up his half-century during this time, his 50 coming off 150 deliveries, and South Africa were four for 190 at tea, with only about thirty overs until the close of play. Australia needed a wicket every five overs, but instead, they only got one in the whole session; the 112-run partnership between Rudolph and Kemp was broken late in the final session, Ricky Ponting and Shane Warne combining to dismiss Kemp for 55 (166 balls, 213 minutes). With only a handful of overs remaining, Rudolph brought up a century, his 102 coming from 283 balls and 431 minutes. Rudolph and Mark Boucher batted out the remaining overs, and Australia and South Africa would go into Melbourne's Boxing Day Test with the series level at 0–0. The Melbourne Herald Sun claimed in their post-match report that the Australian captain Ponting "was dealing with one of the biggest blunders of his career", after Australia failed to win the match, and that Terry Alderman accused Ponting of "a lack of imagination".

=== 2nd Test ===
26–30 December 2005
Scorecard

Australia	v	South Africa
355 (119.3 overs); MEK Hussey 122 (203); A Nel 4–84 (31 overs)		311 (111 overs); HH Gibbs 94 (234); A Symonds 3–50 (20 overs)
321/7 dec (83 overs); ML Hayden 137 (242); JH Kallis 3–58 (11 overs)		181 (74 overs); SM Pollock 67* (120); SK Warne 4–74 (28 overs)

Australia won by 184 runs
Melbourne Cricket Ground, Melbourne, Australia
Umpires: Asad Rauf (PAK) and SA Bucknor (WI)
Player of the match: MEK Hussey (AUS)

- Australia won the toss and elected to bat.
- PA Jaques (AUS) made his Test debut.

Justin Kemp failed a fitness test before the match at the Melbourne Cricket Ground, while Jacques Kallis recovered from an elbow injury and would take Kemp's place. For Australia, Phil Jaques made his debut, replacing the injured Justin Langer. Spin bowler Stuart MacGill also replaced pacer Nathan Bracken. However, after Australia's captain Ponting had won the toss and set Jaques in to bat with Matthew Hayden, Shaun Pollock got a breakthrough in the third over by having Jaques caught at short leg, and Ponting had to start batting in the fourth over. South Africa could have had another wicket three balls later, as Ponting edged through the spread-out slips cordon, and Ponting was also dropped on 17 by André Nel.

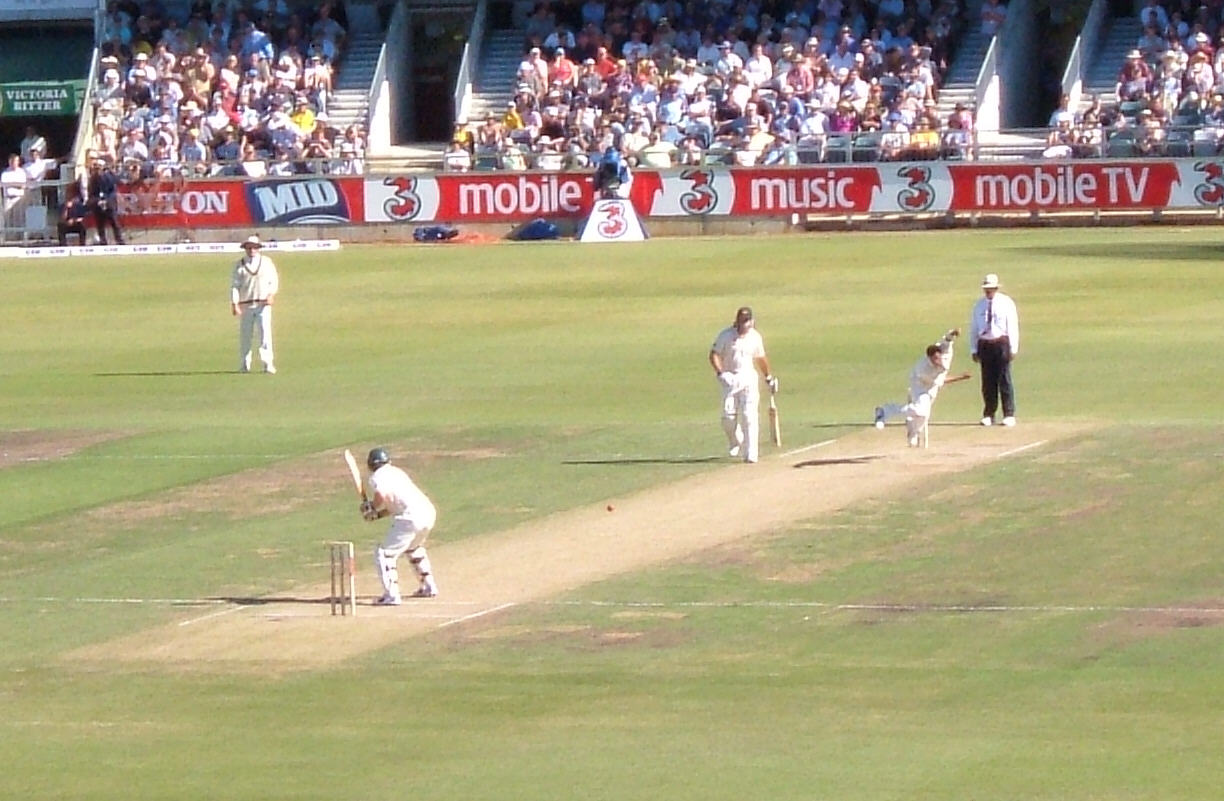
Ntini bowls, 1st test

Ponting and Hayden batted until lunch, however, adding 58 in 17 overs before the break was taken, and a further 37 overs was played in the afternoon session. Through 34 of them, Australia lost no further wicket, before Hayden edged a ball from Pollock to Graeme Smith at slip for 65. Pollock got one further wicket on the day, removing Brad Hodge for 7 with the score at three for 176, but Ponting stuck in, getting his 26th Test century in the 68th over. He pushed on to 117 before he was caught off Nel, who paid back for his dropped catch with four wickets in eight overs; he also got Andrew Symonds for a duck, Adam Gilchrist for two and Shane Warne for nine. Makhaya Ntini then ended the day five balls before the scheduled minimum of 90 overs by having Brett Lee lbw on four, which left Mike Hussey not out on 23 overnight with Stuart MacGill and Glenn McGrath (both with Test batting averages below 10) yet to bat.

On the second morning, MacGill came in to bat with Hussey, and departed in the third over having made four. McGrath was more stubborn, however, totalling 11 not out in his 28-over, 107-run stand with Hussey, who batted until lunch and made 122. The stand of 107 was an Australian tenth-wicket record in Tests against South Africa. South Africa then batted out the day, scoring 169 in 58 overs with both AB de Villiers and Herschelle Gibbs completing half-centuries, while Andrew Symonds bowled the most overs of the three spinners with 13.

On the third day, Brett Lee took two South African middle-order wickets, getting Kallis and Rudolph bowled before Mark Boucher settled in with the top-scorer of the innings, Gibbs. The two batted together for 11 overs, but Symonds removed them both within three overs before getting Shaun Pollock lbw for 9. His seven-over spell yielded three wickets, and spinners Warne and MacGill took care of the last batsmen as South Africa were bowled out for 311. Australia closed the third day on two for 110, with Matthew Hayden on 45, and he continued onto his century on the fourth day.

Hayden and Hussey shared a stand of 62 in 23 overs after Hodge was dismissed early on, but when Graeme Smith had Hussey caught, Hayden and Symonds hit out. Symonds hit a six with his third ball, a straight loft, and the pair hit eight sixes and 124 runs in 85 balls. Jacques Kallis then had three men caught in an over with the new ball, and Australia declared with a lead of 365. Symonds continued on his efforts with the bat, and according to Cricinfo journalist Anand Vasu, he lifted "Australia to within a dreadlock's breadth of victory". After Smith, de Villiers and Gibbs had been dismissed by the experienced bowlers of Warne and McGrath, South Africa were three for 58, and needed a rebuilding effort from Kallis and Ashwell Prince. However, after 39 minutes of batting, Kallis dabbled at a ball outside off, and the ball caught the edge and went into Gilchrist's hands to leave South Africa four down. Symonds got a further wicket, ending with 4–2–6–2, and another wicket fell before the close of play, as Australia needed four more wickets on the fifth day for victory. South Africa, meanwhile, needed 267 runs.

South Africa lasted a little more than a session, with Shaun Pollock batting for two and a half hours in a futile attempt to save the draw. However, Ashwell Prince departed just before the drinks break, dismissed by Warne for the fourth time in the series, and Boje held out for an hour before edging a ball from McGrath onto his stumps for 13. One over after lunch, it was all over, with Makhaya Ntini bowled by MacGill as South Africa were all out for 181, losing by 184 runs and going 0–1 down before the third and final Test in Sydney.

=== 3rd Test ===
2–6 January 2006
Scorecard

South Africa	v	Australia
451/9 dec (154.4 overs); AG Prince 119 (271); B Lee 3–82 (30.4 overs)		359 (95.1 overs); RT Ponting 120 (174); A Nel 4–81 (24.1 overs)
194/6 dec (42 overs); HH Gibbs 67 (74); SCG MacGill 3–33 (6 overs)		288/2 (60.3 overs); RT Ponting 143* (159); CK Langeveldt 1–52 (14 overs)

Australia won by 8 wickets
Sydney Cricket Ground, Sydney, Australia
Umpires: Aleem Dar (PAK) and BF Bowden (NZ)
Player of the match: RT Ponting (AUS)

- South Africa won the toss and elected to bat.
- J Botha (SA) made his Test debut.

South Africa batted first at the SCG after winning the toss, in conditions that were "ideal for seam bowling" according to Cricinfo journalist S Rajesh. No play was possibly before lunch due to drizzle, and when play started overhead conditions were cloudy and the pitch was visibly green. It enabled Australia to take three wickets in the first session, with AB de Villiers caught behind for two in the sixth over off Brett Lee. Lee was also able to grab Graeme Smith, leaving South Africa at three for 86, but Ashwell Prince and Jacques Kallis batted out the six overs until the tea break, before enjoying conditions that "gradually became batsman-friendly". The two put on 146 unbeaten runs on the first day to take South Africa to three for 230 at stumps.

Though Brett Lee opened the second day's play with what was described as a "torrid spell", where he had the batsmen beaten and hit on the body, and even had a "legitimate lbw shout" against Kallis when on 85. Kallis went on to make 111 before he was caught off the bowling of Symonds (his only wicket of the innings), while his batting partner, Prince, registered his third Test century before he was given out for 119 to a ball that "would have missed off". Prince and Kallis' partnership was a South African fourth-wicket record against Australia, while Australia's slow bowlers, Warne and MacGill, ended with a combined analysis of three wickets for 208. In the final session of the day, Shaun Pollock and Test debutant Johan Botha (who had come in for the injured Ntini) put on 49 for the eighth wicket to take South Africa past 400, and they eventually declared on nine for 451. Then, the last hour of the second day yielded three wickets, with Langer and Hayden inside edging Langeveldt to be bowled before the last ball of the day was fended to short leg to see Hodge out for 6. Australia were three for 54, still 397 behind.

On the third day, a century from Ponting and late hitting from Gilchrist helped Australia to limit the deficit and prevent the follow on, but they were still behind on first innings. An hour's play was lost due to rain, but when it did start Ponting and Hussey batted together for two and a half hours, adding 130 before Botha got his first Test wicket when a straighter ball from the spinner had Hussey caught behind. The Cricinfo report claimed that Hussey was "extremely lucky to survive an lbw shout on 9 off Nel", but he did go on to make 45; Ponting was on 97 when the partnership was broken, and brought up the century with a flick wide of mid-on. He thus became the sixth man to score a century in his 100th Test.

Just before tea, South Africa took three wickets for four runs, with Ponting (lbw to Kallis 120), Symonds (lbw to Nel 12) and Warne (caught behind off Nel for a golden duck) out, and Australia were seven for 226, trailing by 225 and with Adam Gilchrist and Brett Lee at the crease. Lee left after an 11-over stand with Gilchrist which had yielded 37 runs, but Stuart MacGill upped the ante with Gilchrist, and the pair hit at more than five an over in a ninth-wicket partnership worth 59. When MacGill went for 29 off 21 balls, Gilchrist then shielded McGrath from the strike, as the No. 11 faced twelve balls in his half-hour innings worth one run, and though Gilchrist eventually gloved a ball to the keeper, he had made 86 runs and helped cut the deficit to 92.

South Africa started their innings with four runs off McGrath's first over, but in the next over de Villiers became Lee's victim once again; in the first innings, he had been caught behind for two, now he was lbw for 1. The South African opener thus saw his average fall by seven runs during this series, after his three single-figure scores in the six innings.

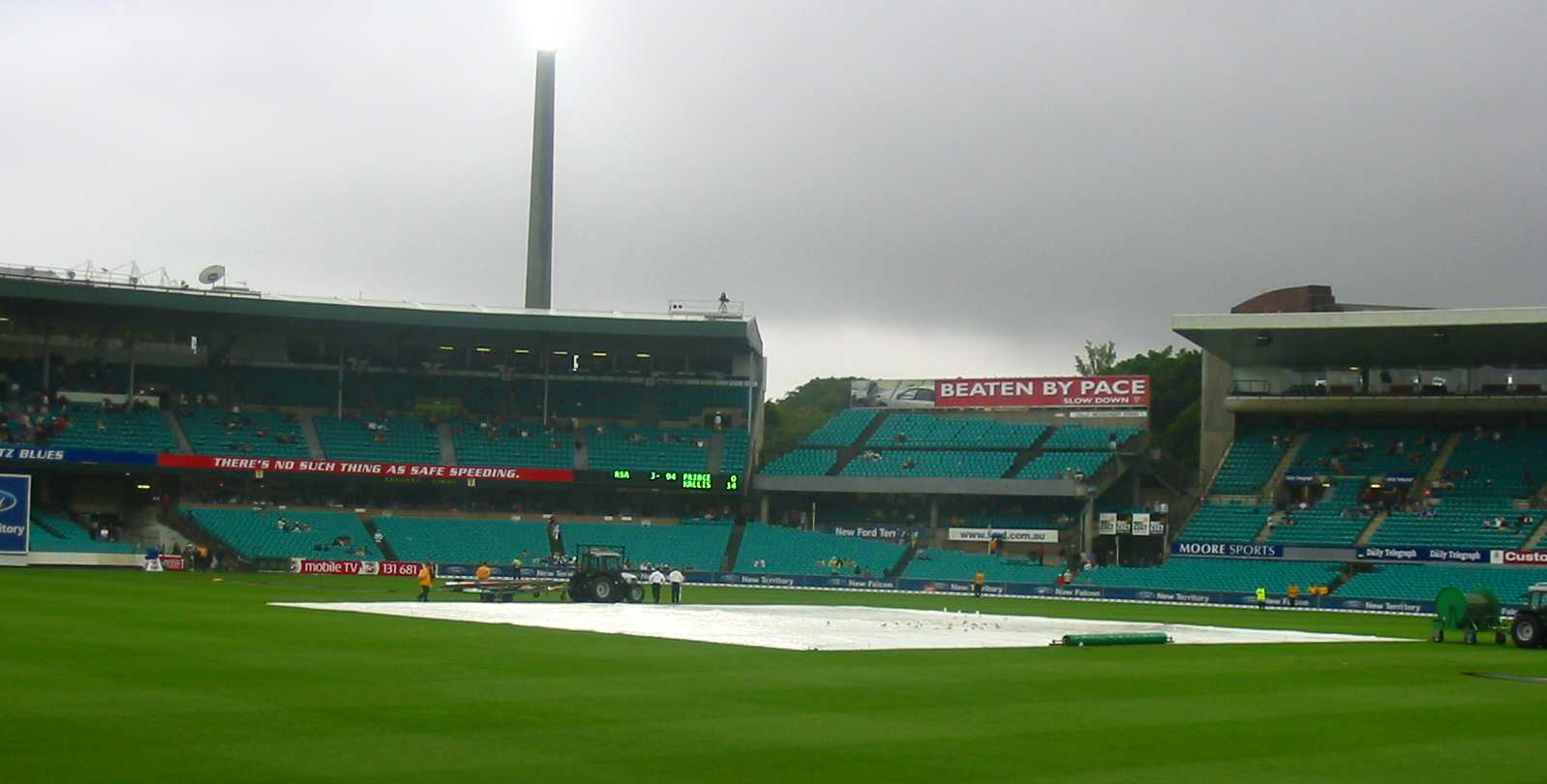
Rain delayed play for most of day 4 in the third Test

The fourth day saw 70 overs of play lost due to rain, and though Gibbs hit 67 off 74 balls before he was run out by Hodge, South Africa's other batsmen could only add 23 in the 20.3 overs of play. Smith had been given lbw in the second over of the morning, though it was suggested that the ball "would have sailed over the stumps". Gibbs and Kallis then added 86 in 19 overs during showers, and shortly afterwards an early tea break was taken; the players never returned on the fourth day.

South Africa batted for 20 more overs on the fifth day before declaring, with the total on six for 194 after Kallis had got his half-century and Pollock added 26 not out in a 42-run seventh-wicket stand with Kallis. The declaration was described as "extremely sporting" by the Cricinfo reporter. Australia were left to chase 287 in 76 overs, and though Langer was dismissed four balls before lunch was taken, South Africa got only one more wicket. Captain Ponting took over from Langer, and accumulated runs on both sides of the wicket, ending his innings with a strike rate of 90. His strokeplay was described as "delectable", and in the two sessions post-lunch, South Africa could not get him out. His century was brought up shortly after tea, and as he was supported by Hayden, who hit 90 in a 182-run second-wicket partnership, Ponting could guide Australia to a 2–0 win margin. With 143 not out, he also became the first batsman to hit two centuries in his 100th Test. For his efforts, Ponting was named both Man of the Match, and Man of the Series after his 515 runs at a batting average of 103.

== T20I series ==
=== Only T20I ===
9 January 2006 (D/N)
Scorecard

Australia; 209/3 (20 overs)	v	South Africa; 114 (18.3 overs)
DR Martyn 96 (56); SM Pollock 4–0–34–1		MV Boucher 29 (21); NW Bracken 3–0–9–2

Australia won by 95 runs
Brisbane Cricket Ground, Woolloongabba, Brisbane, Australia
Umpires: BNJ Oxenford (AUS) and RL Parry (AUS)
Player of the match: DR Martyn (AUS)

- Australia won the toss and elected to bat.
- NW Bracken, SR Clark, BJ Haddin, and ML Lewis (all AUS), and J Botha, HH Dippenaar, AJ Hall, GJP Kruger, JA Rudolph, and M Zondeki (all SA) made their T20I debuts.

Garnett Kruger got his international debut in what was South Africa's second Twenty20 international, and turned out to be their fifth loss on tour, as they barely made 50% of Australia's score. The crowd of 38,894 was a record for any sporting event at the Brisbane Cricket Ground, and they got to watch the home side put out "an utterly convincing and breathtaking performance" according to the Cricinfo report. Australia opened the batting with James Hopes and Damien Martyn, and after Hopes was out having made 17 in a 57-run first-wicket partnership, Martyn and Ponting continued. Ponting was caught off Johan Botha for 27, in the spinners' first over, but in the next over Martyn brought up his fifty, and with Symonds hitting a half-century as well, Australia closed on 3 for 209, with Symonds hitting 20 off Monde Zondeki with the last five balls of the last over. Martyn was out with the first ball of that over, hitting to Gibbs at point for 96, four short of the first century in Twenty20 International cricket.

South Africa lost Boeta Dippenaar and Gibbs in the third over, with Nathan Bracken's opening spell yielding both to end with bowling figures of 3–0–9–2. Hopes then got the wicket of Smith, who had been out for 22, and that was to be the third-highest score of the innings. Boucher made 29 and Pollock 24, but by the end of the fourteenth over they were both out, with the score six for 92. Mick Lewis got the last two wickets of Kruger and Zondeki to end the match in the nineteenth over, with South Africa bowled out for 114; all five bowlers got a wicket, though the Cricinfo reporter claimed that the fall of wickets was "not so much due to tight bowling as outrageously slick fielding and catching"

== One-day Internationals ==
South Africa failed to make the final of the VB Series, being knocked out by Sri Lanka after losing the final game by 76 runs.

== Tour itinerary ==
Warm-up matches marked 'W'. Other matches numbered as their match as part of the VB Series as a whole:

No.	Date	Opponents	Venue	Result	Ref
W	10 January	Queensland	Brisbane Cricket Ground, Brisbane	Won by 94 runs	
W	13 January	Queensland Academy of Sport	Allan Border Field, Brisbane	Won by 46 runs	
2	15 January	Australia	Brisbane Cricket Ground, Brisbane	Won by 5 wickets	
3	17 January	Sri Lanka	Brisbane Cricket Ground, Brisbane	Lost by 94 runs	
4	20 January	Australia	Docklands Stadium, Melbourne	Lost by 59 runs	
6	24 January	Sri Lanka	Adelaide Oval, Adelaide	Won by 9 runs	
9	31 January	Sri Lanka	WACA Ground, Perth	Won by 5 wickets	
10	3 February	Australia	Docklands Stadium, Melbourne	Lost by 80 runs	
11	5 February	Australia	Sydney Cricket Ground, Sydney	Lost by 57 runs	
12	7 February	Sri Lanka	Bellerive Oval, Hobart	Lost by 76 runs	
