= South African cricket team in New Zealand in 2003–04 =

	New Zealand	South Africa
- Dates: 13 February – 30 March 2004
Captains	Stephen Fleming	Graeme Smith

Test series
- Result: 3-match series drawn 1–1
Most runs	Scott Styris (321)	Jacques Kallis (354)
Most wickets	Chris Martin (18)	Shaun Pollock (12)

One Day International series
- Results: New Zealand won the 6-match series 5–1
Most runs	Stephen Fleming (264)	Graeme Smith (256)
Most wickets	Jacob Oram (7)	Makhaya Ntini (11)

The South African national cricket team toured New Zealand in February and March 2004 and played a three-match Test series against the New Zealand national cricket team. The series was tied 1–1. New Zealand were captained by Stephen Fleming and South Africa by Graeme Smith. In addition, the teams played a six-match series of One Day Internationals (ODIs) which New Zealand won 5–1.

== ODI series ==
=== 1st ODI ===
13 February 2004 (D/N)
Scorecard

New Zealand; 225/8 (50 overs)	v	South Africa; 226/5 (49.4 overs)
Scott Styris 60 (81); Lance Klusener 2/39 (9 overs)		Graeme Smith 72 (91); Daniel Vettori 2/37 (10 overs)

South Africa won by 5 wickets
Eden Park, Auckland
Umpires: Doug Cowie (NZ) and Steve Davis (Aus)
Player of the match: Graeme Smith (SA)

- South Africa won the toss and elected to field.
- Michael Papps (NZ) made his ODI debut.

=== 2nd ODI ===
17 February 2004 (D/N)
Scorecard

South Africa; 253/8 (50 overs)	v	New Zealand; 255/5 (45.1 overs)
Graeme Smith 80 (109); Chris Cairns 2/35 (8 overs)		Stephen Fleming 108 (115); Makhaya Ntini 3/45 (10 overs)

New Zealand won by 5 wickets
Jade Stadium, Christchurch
Umpires: Steve Davis (Aus) and Tony Hill (NZ)
Player of the match: Stephen Fleming (NZ)

- South Africa won the toss and elected to bat.

=== 3rd ODI ===
20 February 2004 (D/N)
Scorecard

New Zealand; 254/5 (38 overs)	v	South Africa; 249/7 (38 overs)
Michael Papps 67 (100); Graeme Smith 1/36 (4.1 overs)		Herschelle Gibbs 69 (64); Daniel Vettori 2/41 (8 overs)

New Zealand won by 5 runs
Westpac Stadium, Wellington
Umpires: Steve Davis (Aus) and Tony Hill (NZ)
Player of the match: Scott Styris (NZ)

- South Africa won the toss and elected to field.
- The match was reduced before play started to 38 overs per side.
- Albie Morkel (SA) made his ODI debut.

=== 4th ODI ===
24 February 2004 (D/N)
Scorecard

New Zealand	v	South Africa

Match abandoned
Carisbrook, Dunedin
Umpires: Tony Hill (NZ) and Russell Tiffin (Zim)

- South Africa won the toss and elected to field.
- The match was replayed the next day.

==== Replay ====
25 February 2004
Scorecard

South Africa; 259/7 (50 overs)	v	New Zealand; 264/4 (49 overs)
Jacques Rudolph 70* (71); Jacob Oram 3/51 (10 overs)		Hamish Marshall 74 (94); Makhaya Ntini 2/63 (10 overs)

New Zealand won by 6 wickets
Carisbrook, Dunedin
Umpires: Tony Hill (NZ) and Russell Tiffin (Zim)
Player of the match: Hamish Marshall (NZ)

- New Zealand won the toss and elected to field.

=== 5th ODI ===
28 February 2004 (D/N)
Scorecard

New Zealand	v	South Africa

Match abandoned
Eden Park, Auckland
Umpires: Doug Cowie (NZ) and Russell Tiffin (Zim)

- The match was replayed the next day.

==== Replay ====
29 February 2004
Scorecard

New Zealand; 193/8 (33 overs)	v	South Africa; 175/5 (29 overs)
Chris Harris 55 (55); Makhaya Ntini 3/47 (7 overs)		Jacques Kallis 58* (59); Jacob Oram 2/20 (6 overs)

New Zealand won by 2 runs (D/L method)
Eden Park, Auckland
Umpires: Doug Cowie (NZ) and Russell Tiffin (Zim)
Player of the match: Chris Harris (NZ)

- South Africa won the toss and elected to field.
- The match was reduced before play started to 33 overs per side.
- South Africa's target was adjusted to 178 runs in 29 overs.

=== 6th ODI ===
2 March 2004
Scorecard

South Africa; 186/9 (50 overs)	v	New Zealand; 190/5 (46 overs)
Ashwell Prince 47 (86); Jacob Oram 3/24 (10 overs)		Michael Papps 92* (139); Robin Peterson 1/28 (9 overs)

New Zealand won by 5 wickets
McLean Park, Napier
Umpires: Tony Hill (NZ) and Russell Tiffin (Zim)
Player of the match: Michael Papps (NZ)

- South Africa won the toss and elected to bat.

== Test series ==
=== 1st Test ===
10–14 March 2004
Scorecard

South Africa	v	New Zealand
459 (139.2 overs); Gary Kirsten 137 (213); Daniel Vettori 4/158 (39.2 overs)		509 (164.4 overs); Jacob Oram 119* (216); Shaun Pollock 4/98 (30.4 overs)
313/4d (116.1 overs); Jacques Kallis 150* (312); Paul Wiseman 2/68 (19 overs)		39/1 (16 overs); Brendon McCullum 19* (48); André Nel 1/15 (4 overs)

Match drawn
Westpac Park, Hamilton
Umpires: Steve Davis (Aus) and Russell Tiffin (Zim)
Player of the match: Jacques Kallis (SA)

- South Africa won the toss and elected to bat.
- Brendon McCullum and Michael Papps (both NZ) made their Test debuts.

=== 2nd Test ===
18–22 March 2004
Scorecard

South Africa	v	New Zealand
296 (123.3 overs); Graeme Smith 88 (178); Chris Martin 6/76 (31 overs)		595 (148.5 overs); Scott Styris 170 (220); Shaun Pollock 4/113 (32.5 overs)
349 (108.3 overs); Jacques Rudolph 154* (312); Chris Martin 5/104 (23 overs)		53/1 (10.2 overs); Stephen Fleming 31* (11); Makhaya Ntini 1/31 (5 overs)

New Zealand won by 9 wickets
Eden Park, Auckland
Umpires: Aleem Dar (Pak) and Asoka de Silva (SL)
Player of the match: Chris Martin (NZ)

- New Zealand won the toss and elected to field.

=== 3rd Test ===
26–30 March 2004
Scorecard

New Zealand	v	South Africa
297 (104 overs); Mathew Sinclair 74 (181); Nicky Boje 4/65 (20 overs)		316 (99.5 overs); Jacques Rudolph 93* (212); Chris Martin 5/55 (20 overs)
252 (96.2 overs); Scott Styris 73 (131); Nicky Boje 4/69 (33.2 overs)		234/4 (72.2 overs); Graeme Smith 125* (203); Chris Martin 2/65 (18.2 overs)

South Africa won by 6 wickets
Basin Reserve, Wellington
Umpires: Aleem Dar (Pak) and Asoka de Silva (SL)
Player of the match: Graeme Smith (SA)

- South Africa won the toss and elected to field.
- Michael Mason (NZ) made his Test debut.
