= List of international cricket centuries by Joe Root =

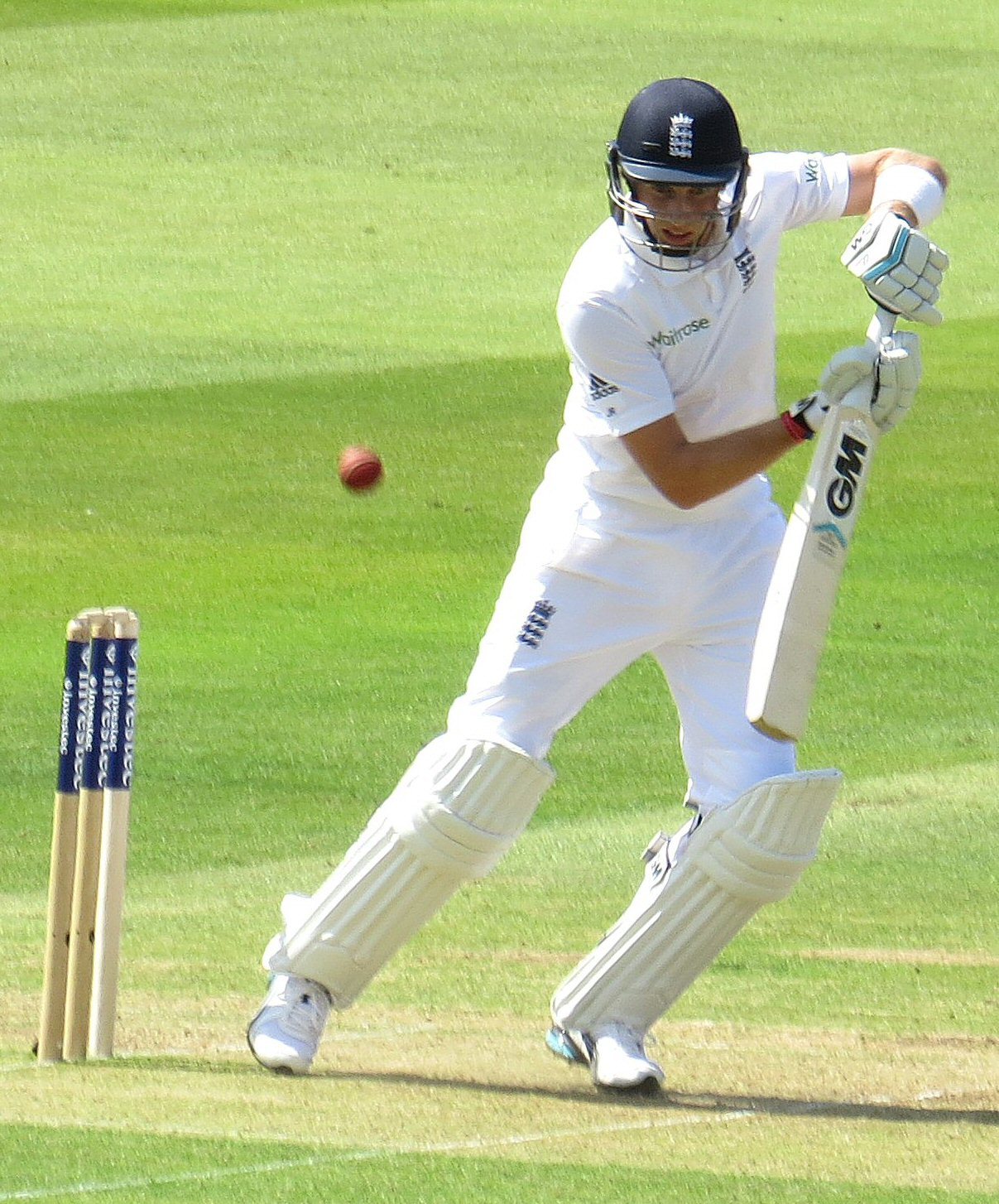
Joe Root has scored 61 centuries for England.

Joe Root is an English cricketer and captain of the England Test team. Described by his compatriots Eoin Morgan and Alastair Cook as the "most complete batsman" England has ever produced, Root has played 163 Tests, 189 One Day Internationals (ODIs) and 32 Twenty20 Internationals (T20Is), scoring 41 Test centuries (100 or more runs in an innings) and 20 ODI centuries as of January 2026.

Root made his Test debut in December 2012 and scored his first century the following year when he made 104 against New Zealand at Headingley. In July 2013, he became the youngest English player to score an Ashes century at Lord's when he made 180 in the second Test of the home series against Australia. His innings earned him the man of the match award and ensured England's victory. Root's performance during the 2013 season led to him being named as one of the five Cricketers of the Year by Wisden Cricketers' Almanack in 2014. He went on to score three more centuries the same year, including a double century (200 not out) against Sri Lanka at Lord's. His highest score of 262 came against Pakistan during the first Test in October 2024; during the innings he overtook Alastair Cook to become England's leading run-scorer in Test cricket. Root became the first cricketer to score a double century in their 100th Test, scoring 218 against India at the M. A. Chidambaram Stadium, Chennai in February 2021. As of January 2026, Root has scored centuries against seven of the other eleven Test-playing nations; (Note: The exceptions are Afghanistan, Bangladesh, Ireland and Zimbabwe.) he has been most prolific against India, scoring 13 centuries against them.

Root scored his first ODI century in 2014 against the West Indies. His 19 centuries in the format are the most by an English player. His centuries have come against eight different opponents. His highest ODI score of 166 not out was made against the West Indies in June 2025 to rescue England in a run chase.

Root has played 32 Twenty20 International (T20I) matches since his debut in December 2012. He is yet to score a century in the format; his 90 not out against Australia in August 2013 remains his highest score. As of January 2026, Root ranks sixth among cricketers with most centuries in international cricket.

== Key ==
- * – Remained not out
- ‡ – Captain of England in that match
- † – Man of the match

== Test centuries ==
Test centuries scored by Joe Root
No.	Score	Against	Pos.	Inn.	Test	Venue	H/A/N	Date	Result	Ref
1	104	New Zealand	5	1	2/2	Headingley, Leeds	Home	24 May 2013	Won	
2	180 †	Australia	2	3	2/5	Lord's, London	Home	18 July 2013	Won	
3	200* †	Sri Lanka	5	1	1/2	Lord's, London	Home	12 June 2014	Drawn	
4	154*	India	5	2	1/5	Trent Bridge, Nottingham	Home	9 July 2014	Drawn	
5	149* †	India	5	2	5/5	The Oval, London	Home	15 August 2014	Won	
6	182* †	West Indies	5	2	2/3	National Cricket Stadium, St. George's	Away	21 April 2015	Won	
7	134 †	Australia	5	1	1/5	Sophia Gardens, Cardiff	Home	8 July 2015	Won	
8	130	Australia	4	2	4/5	Trent Bridge, Nottingham	Home	6 August 2015	Won	
9	110	South Africa	4	2	3/4	Wanderers Stadium, Johannesburg	Away	14 January 2016	Won	
10	254 †	Pakistan	3	1	2/4	Old Trafford, Manchester	Home	22 July 2016	Won	
11	124	India	3	1	1/5	Saurashtra Cricket Association Stadium, Rajkot	Away	9 November 2016	Drawn	
12	190 ‡	South Africa	4	1	1/4	Lord's, London	Home	6 July 2017	Won	
13	136 ‡	West Indies	4	1	1/3	Edgbaston Cricket Ground, Birmingham	Home	17 August 2017	Won	
14	125 ‡	India	4	3	5/5	The Oval, London	Home	7 September 2018	Won	
15	124 † ‡	Sri Lanka	4	3	2/3	Pallekele International Cricket Stadium, Kandy	Away	14 November 2018	Won	
16	122 ‡	West Indies	4	3	3/3	Daren Sammy Cricket Ground, Gros Islet	Away	9 February 2019	Won	
17	226 † ‡	New Zealand	4	2	2/2	Seddon Park, Hamilton	Away	29 November 2019	Drawn	
18	228 † ‡	Sri Lanka	4	2	1/2	Galle International Stadium, Galle	Away	14 January 2021	Won	
19	186 † ‡	Sri Lanka	4	2	2/2	Galle International Stadium, Galle	Away	22 January 2021	Won	
20	218 † ‡	India	4	1	1/4	M. A. Chidambaram Stadium, Chennai	Away	5 February 2021	Won	
21	109 † ‡	India	4	3	1/5	Trent Bridge, Nottingham	Home	4 August 2021	Drawn	
22	180* ‡	India	4	2	2/5	Lord's, London	Home	12 August 2021	Lost	
23	121 ‡	India	4	2	3/5	Headingley, Leeds	Home	25 August 2021	Won	
24	109 ‡	West Indies	3	3	1/3	Sir Vivian Richards Stadium, North Sound	Away	8 March 2022	Drawn	
25	153 ‡	West Indies	3	1	2/3	Kensington Oval, Bridgetown	Away	16 March 2022	Drawn	
26	115* †	New Zealand	4	4	1/3	Lord's, London	Home	2 June 2022	Won	
27	176	New Zealand	4	2	2/3	Trent Bridge, Nottingham	Home	10 June 2022	Won	
28	142*	India	4	4	5/5	Edgbaston Cricket Ground, Birmingham	Home	1 July 2022	Won	
29	153*	New Zealand	4	1	2/2	Basin Reserve, Wellington	Away	24 February 2023	Lost	
30	118*	Australia	4	1	1/5	Edgbaston Cricket Ground, Birmingham	Home	16 June 2023	Lost	
31	122*	India	4	1	4/5	JSCA International Stadium Complex, Ranchi	Away	23 February 2024	Lost	
32	122	West Indies	4	3	2/3	Trent Bridge, Nottingham	Home	18 July 2024	Won	
33	143	Sri Lanka	4	1	2/3	Lord's, London	Home	29 August 2024	Won	
34	103	Sri Lanka	4	3	2/3	Lord's, London	Home	29 August 2024	Won	
35	262	Pakistan	3	2	1/3	Multan Cricket Stadium, Multan	Away	7 October 2024	Won	
36	106	New Zealand	4	3	2/3	Basin Reserve, Wellington	Away	6 December 2024	Won	
37	104	India	4	1	3/5	Lord's, London	Home	10 July 2025	Won	
38	150	India	4	2	4/5	Old Trafford, Manchester	Home	23 July 2025	Drawn	
39	105	India	4	4	5/5	The Oval, London	Home	31 July 2025	Lost	
40	138*	Australia	4	1	2/5	The Gabba, Brisbane	Away	4 December 2025	Lost	
41	160	Australia	4	1	5/5	Sydney Cricket Ground, Sydney	Away	4 January 2026	Lost	

== One Day International centuries ==
ODI centuries scored by Joe Root
No.	Score	Against	Pos.	Inn.	S/R	Venue	H/A/N	Date	Result	Ref
1	107 †	West Indies	4	1	87.70	Sir Vivian Richards Stadium, North Sound	Away	5 March 2014	Won	
2	113 †	India	4	1	104.62	Headingley, Leeds	Home	5 September 2014	Won	
3	104* †	Sri Lanka	4	2	88.88	Pallekele International Cricket Stadium, Kandy	Away	10 December 2014	Won	
4	121	Sri Lanka	4	1	112.03	Wellington Regional Stadium, Wellington	Neutral	1 March 2015	Lost	
5	104	New Zealand	3	1	133.33	Edgbaston, Birmingham	Home	9 June 2015	Won	
6	106*	New Zealand	3	2	109.27	Trent Bridge, Nottingham	Home	17 June 2015	Won	
7	125	South Africa	3	1	110.61	SuperSport Park, Centurion	Away	9 February 2016	Lost	
8	109	South Africa	3	1	87.90	Wanderers Stadium, Johannesburg	Away	12 February 2016	Lost	
9	101	West Indies	3	1	93.51	Kensington Oval, Bridgetown	Away	9 March 2017	Won	
10	133* †	Bangladesh	3	2	103.10	The Oval, London	Home	1 June 2017	Won	
11	102	New Zealand	3	1	100.99	University Oval, Dunedin	Away	7 March 2018	Lost	
12	113* †	India	3	1	97.41	Lord's, London	Home	14 July 2018	Won	
13	100*	India	3	2	83.33	Headingley, Leeds	Home	17 July 2018	Won	
14	102	West Indies	3	2	105.15	Kensington Oval, Bridgetown	Away	20 February 2019	Won	
15	107	Pakistan	3	2	102.88	Trent Bridge, Nottingham	Home	3 June 2019	Lost	
16	100* †	West Indies	2	2	106.38	Rose Bowl, Southampton	Home	14 June 2019	Won	
17	120	Afghanistan	4	2	108.10	Gaddafi Stadium, Lahore	Neutral	26 February 2025	Lost	
18	166* †	West Indies	3	2	119.42	Sophia Gardens, Cardiff	Home	1 June 2025	Won	
19	100	South Africa	3	1	104.16	Rose Bowl, Southampton	Home	7 September 2025	Won	
20	111*	Sri Lanka	3	1	102.77	R. Premadasa Stadium, Colombo	Away	27 January 2026	Won	
