= Shawn Gillies =

Jamaican-born Australian cricketer (born 1981)

Winston Shawn Gillies (born 15 April 1981 in Mandeville, Jamaica) is a Jamaican born, Australian cricketer who has played first class matches for Western Warriors. His first match was a warm-up match against South Africa during their 2005–06 tour of Australia, where Gillies had two wickets in his very first over, and a report from Cricket Australia later described his bowling as "continually troubling the batsmen". Gillies ended with three wickets for 58, and 20 runs, as the Warriors beat the South African national team by an innings and 48 runs.

Throughout the 2006-07 domestic season he struggled to break into the Warriors team, battling with several other players for the all-rounder spot. He played only one Pura Cup game that season and two one-day games. The following season he played in only two one-day games and was not rewarded with a contract for the 2008-2009 season.
