= List of international cricket centuries by Graeme Smith =

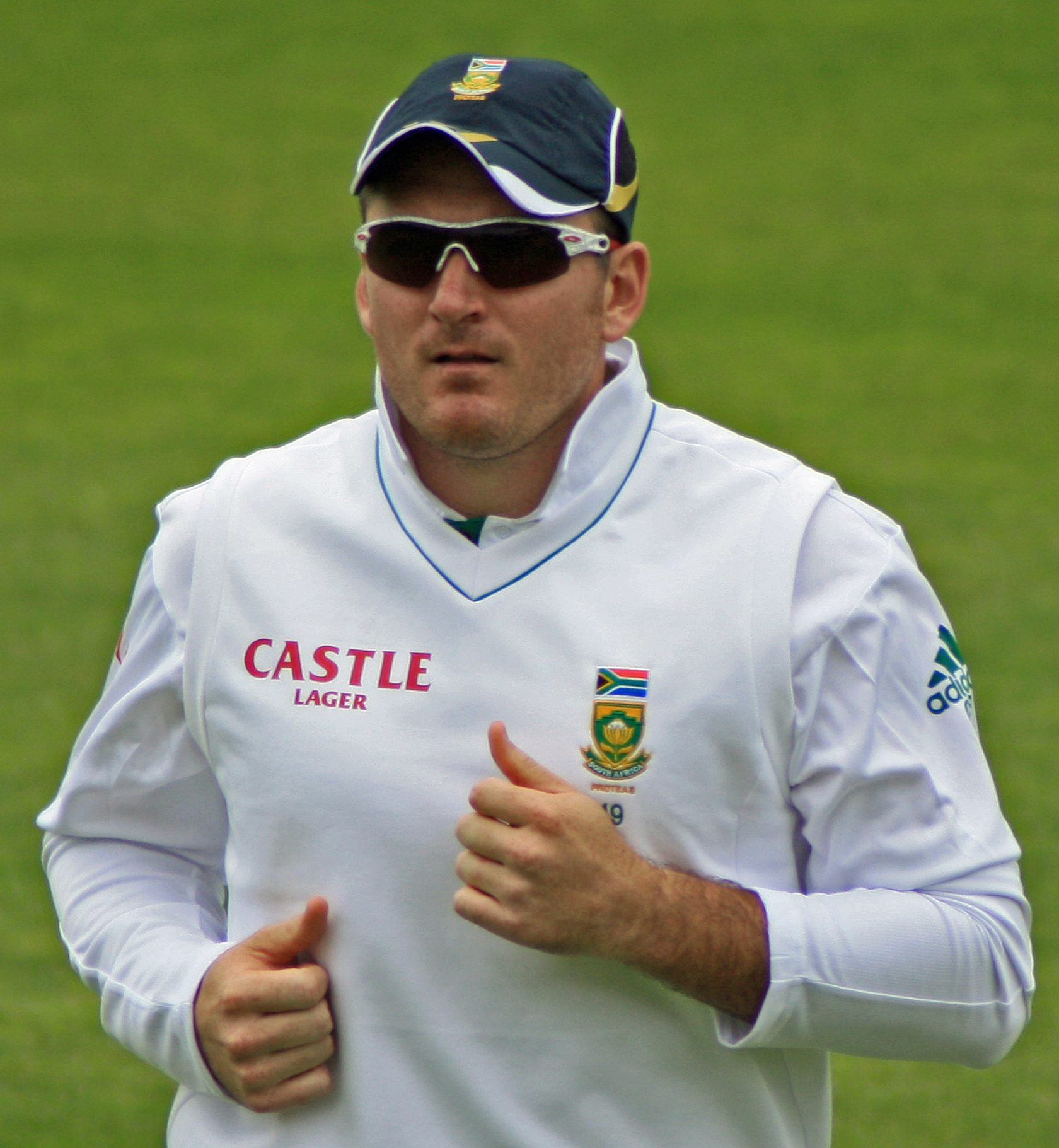
Graeme Smith's five double centuries is a record for South Africa

Graeme Smith is a retired South African cricketer who played international cricket between 2002 and 2014. In a career spanning 12 years, he scored centuries (100 or more runs in a single innings) on 27 and 10 occasions in Test and One Day International (ODI) matches respectively. As of October 2016, his tally of 37 international centuries places him fourth among his countrymen, behind Jacques Kallis (62), Hashim Amla (53) and AB de Villiers (45).

Smith made his Test and ODI debuts against Australia during the 2001–02 home series. His maiden century—200 against Bangladesh—came in October 2002. During South Africa's tour of England in 2003, he scored double centuries—277 at Edgbaston and 259 at Lord's—in consecutive Tests. Smith's performances in the season led to him being named one of the five Wisden Cricketers of the Year in 2004. His three centuries in consecutive Tests were instrumental in ensuring South Africa's series win against the West Indies in 2005. In Tests, Smith made centuries against all teams except India and Sri Lanka. He was most successful against England with seven centuries. With five double centuries he leads the list among South African cricketers as of May 2014. As of October 2015, Smith's four centuries in the fourth innings of a Test match is the second highest by any player, only behind Younus Khan, who has scored five centuries in the fourth innings of a Test. Of his 27 Test centuries, 25 came while captaining the side, and South Africa lost none of its matches on any such instance.

Smith's first ODI century came in 2005, three years after his international debut. He went on to score four more centuries the same year, the second-most in a calendar year by a South African. (Note: The position is jointly held with AB de Villiers and Hashim Amla.) Smith's highest score in ODIs was 141, which he made against England in September 2009. In ODIs, he made centuries against eight different opponents, with three of them scored at venues outside South Africa. Between his debut Twenty20 International and final one in 2005, Smith played 33 matches in the format without scoring a century; his highest score of 89 not out was made against Australia in February 2006.

== Key ==
Symbol	Meaning
*	Remained not out
†	Man of the match
‡	Captained the South African cricket team
Pos.	Position in the batting order
Inn.	The innings of the match
Test	The number of the Test match played in that series
H/A/N	Venue was at home (South Africa), away or neutral
Date	Date the match was held, or the starting date of match for Test matches
Lost	The match was lost by South Africa.
Won	The match was won by South Africa.
Drawn	The match ended in a draw.
S/R	Strike rate during the innings

== Test centuries ==
Test centuries by Graeme Smith
No.	Score	Against	Pos.	Inn.	Test	Venue	H/A/N	Date	Result	Ref
1	200 †	Bangladesh	1	1	1/2	Buffalo Park, East London	Home	18 October 2002	Won	
2	151	Pakistan	1	1	2/2	Newlands Cricket Ground, Cape Town	Home	2 January 2003	Won	
3	277 ‡ †	England	1	1	1/5	Edgbaston, Birmingham	Away	24 July 2003	Drawn	
4	259 ‡ †	England	1	2	2/5	Lord's, London	Away	1 August 2003	Won	
5	132 ‡	West Indies	1	1	1/4	New Wanderers, Johannesburg	Home	12 December 2003	Won	
6	139 ‡	West Indies	1	1	4/4	SuperSport Park, Centurion	Home	16 January 2004	Won	
7	125* ‡	New Zealand	1	4	3/3	Basin Reserve, Wellington	Away	30 March 2004	Won	
8	121 ‡	Zimbabwe	1	2	1/2	Newlands Cricket Ground, Cape Town	Home	4 March 2005	Won	
9	148 ‡	West Indies	1	2	2/4	Queen's Park Oval, Port of Spain, Trinidad	Away	10 April 2005	Won	
10	104 ‡	West Indies	1	2	3/4	Kensington Oval, Bridgetown, Barbados	Away	22 April 2005	Won	
11	126 ‡	West Indies	2	1	4/4	Antigua Recreation Ground, St. John's, Antigua	Away	29 April 2005	Drawn	
12	133 ‡	Pakistan	1	3	2/2	Gaddafi Stadium, Lahore	Away	8 October 2007	Drawn	
13	147 ‡	West Indies	1	2	3/3	Sahara Stadium Kingsmead, Durban	Home	10 January 2008	Won	
14	232 ‡ †	Bangladesh	2	1	2/2	Chittagong Divisional Stadium, Chittagong	Away	29 February 2008	Won	
15	107 ‡	England	1	3	1/4	Lord's, London	Away	13 July 2008	Drawn	
16	154* ‡	England	1	4	3/4	Edgbaston, Birmingham	Away	2 August 2008	Won	
17	157 ‡ †	Bangladesh	1	1	1/2	Chevrolet Park, Bloemfontein	Home	19 November 2008	Won	
18	108 ‡	Australia	1	4	1/3	WACA Ground, Perth	Away	20 December 2008	Won	
19	183 ‡	England	2	3	3/4	Newlands Cricket Ground, Cape Town	Home	5 January 2010	Drawn	
20	105 ‡	England	1	2	4/4	Wanderers Stadium, Johannesburg	Home	15 January 2010	Won	
21	132 ‡	West Indies	1	1	2/3	Warner Park, Basseterre, St. Kitts and Nevis	Away	18 June 2010	Drawn	
22	100 ‡	Pakistan	1	1	1/2	DSC Cricket Stadium, Dubai	Neutral	12 November 2010	Drawn	
23	101* ‡	Australia	1	4	1/2	Newlands Cricket Ground, Cape Town	Home	11 November 2011	Won	
24	115 ‡ †	New Zealand	2	3	1/3	University Oval, Dunedin	Away	9 March 2012	Drawn	
25	131 ‡	England	1	2	1/3	Kennington Oval, London	Away	19 July 2012	Won	
26	122 ‡	Australia	1	2	2/3	Adelaide Oval, Adelaide	Away	24 November 2012	Drawn	
27	234 ‡ †	Pakistan	2	2	2/2	DSC Cricket Stadium, Dubai	Neutral	24 October 2013	Won	

== One-Day International centuries ==
One Day International centuries by Graeme Smith
No.	Score	Against	Pos.	Inn.	S/R	Venue	H/A/N	Date	Result	Ref
1	105 ‡ †	England	1	2	80.15	Sahara Oval St George's, Port Elizabeth	Home	4 February 2005	Won	
2	115* ‡	England	1	1	87.78	Buffalo Park, East London	Home	9 February 2005	Won	
3	117 ‡ †	Zimbabwe	1	1	90.69	Sahara Stadium Kingsmead, Durban	Home	27 February 2005	Won	
4	103 ‡ †	West Indies	1	2	100.98	Sabina Park, Kingston, Jamaica	Away	7 May 2005	Won	
5	134* ‡ †	India	1	2	108.06	Eden Gardens, Kolkata	Away	25 November 2005	Won	
6	119* ‡ †	Australia	1	2	95.96	SuperSport Park, Centurion	Home	26 February 2006	Won	
7	103* ‡ †	Bangladesh	2	2	87.28	Chittagong Divisional Stadium, Chittagong	Away	9 March 2008	Won	
8	141 ‡	England	1	2	105.22	SuperSport Park, Centurion	Home	27 September 2009	Lost	
9	125	Sri Lanka	1	1	87.41	New Wanderers Stadium, Johannesburg	Home	22 January 2012	Lost	
10	116 †	New Zealand	2	2	89.23	Senwes Park, Potchefstroom	Home	25 January 2013	Won	
