= List of cricketers who scored a century in their hundredth Test =

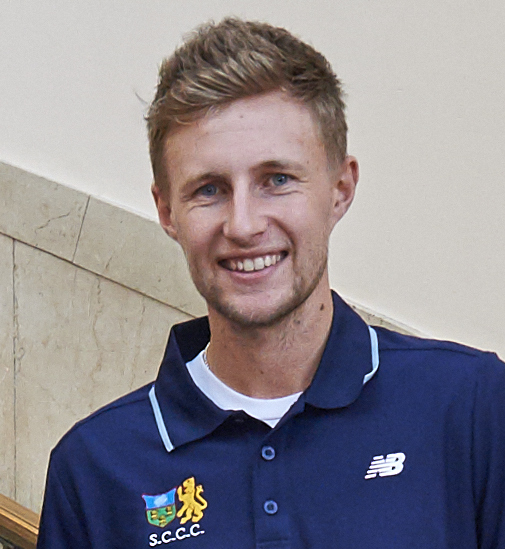
Joe Root has the highest score for a player in their 100th Test match.

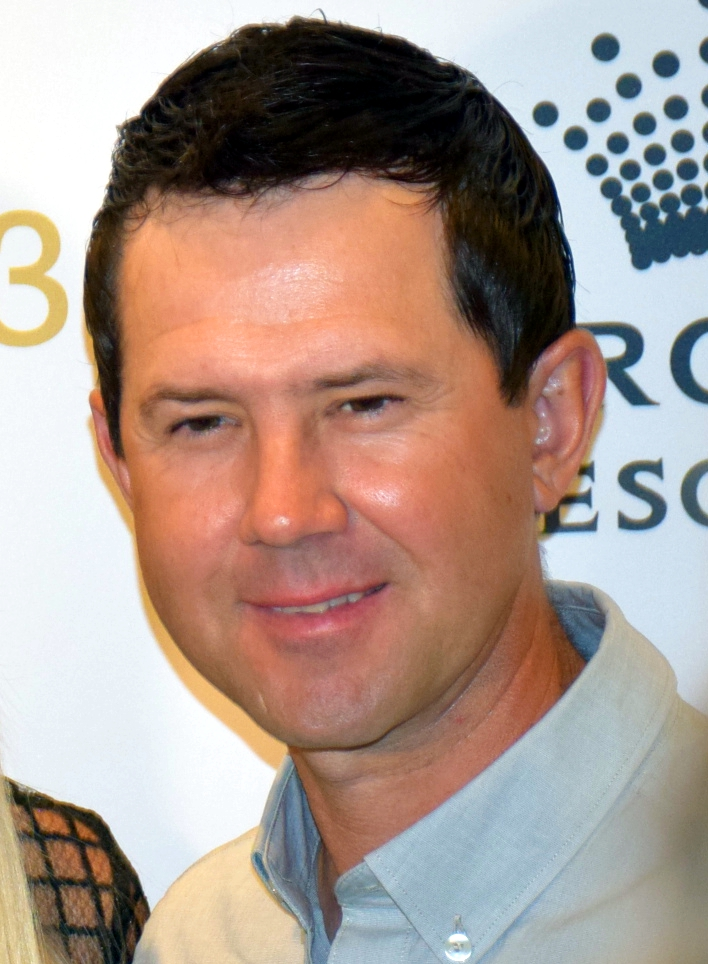
Ricky Ponting is the only player to score two centuries in their 100th Test match.

For a player to score a century (100 runs or more) in their hundredth Test match is considered a notable achievement. As of July 2025, 83 cricketers have played in at least 100 Test matches, and ten players have achieved the milestone of scoring a century in their hundredth Test.

The first player to score a century in their hundredth Test match was Englishman Colin Cowdrey. Cowdrey was the first Test cricketer of any nationality to play 100 Test matches. Greenidge also scored a century on his 100th One Day International appearance, making him one of two to have made a century in their hundredth ODI and hundredth Test match; he was joined by David Warner. Englishman Joe Root has the highest score in a hundredth Test match; he was the first player to have scored a double century (200 runs or more) in their hundredth Test match. Australian Ricky Ponting is the only player to have scored two centuries in their hundredth Test match; Ponting made scores of 120 and 143 not out against South Africa in Sydney in 2006. David Warner became only the second batsman to turn it into a double century, doing so in December 2022.

Australia, England, Pakistan and South Africa are the only teams to have had more than one different player score a century in their hundredth Test match. England have had three different players achieve this feat, the most of any country. The West Indies and Bangladesh are the only other teams to have had a player score a century in their hundredth match. No player has ever scored a century in their hundredth Test match and also been on the losing side.

== Key ==
Key
Symbol	Meaning
Runs	Number of runs scored by the batsman
Inn	Innings in which the batsman made a century
Date	Date on which the match started

== Players ==
No.	Name	Runs	Inn	Team	Opposition	Venue	Date	Result	Ref(s)
1	Colin Cowdrey	104	1	England	Australia	Edgbaston, Birmingham, United Kingdom	11 July 1968	Draw	
2	Javed Miandad	145	2	Pakistan	India	Gaddafi Stadium, Lahore, Pakistan	1 December 1989	Draw	
3	Gordon Greenidge	149	2	West Indies	England	Antigua Recreation Ground, St. John's, Antigua and Barbuda	12 April 1990	Won	
4	Alec Stewart	105	2	England	West Indies	Old Trafford, Manchester, United Kingdom	3 August 2000	Draw	
5	Inzamam-ul-Haq	184	2	Pakistan	India	M. Chinnaswamy Stadium, Bangalore, India	24 March 2005	Won	
6	Ricky Ponting (Note: Ricky Ponting scored a century in both innings of his hundredth Test match. Both innings are listed, but he is only counted once.)	120	2	Australia	South Africa	Sydney Cricket Ground, Sydney, Australia	2 January 2006	Won	
6	Ricky Ponting	143*	4	Australia	South Africa	Sydney Cricket Ground, Sydney, Australia	2 January 2006	Won	
7	Graeme Smith	131	2	South Africa	England	The Oval, London, United Kingdom	19 July 2012	Won	
8	Hashim Amla	134	1	South Africa	Sri Lanka	Wanderers Stadium, Johannesburg, South Africa	12 January 2017	Won	
9	Joe Root	218	1	England	India	M. A. Chidambaram Stadium, Chennai, India	5 February 2021	Won	
10	David Warner	200	2	Australia	South Africa	Melbourne Cricket Ground, Melbourne, Australia	26 December 2022	Won	
11	Mushfiqur Rahim	106	1	Bangladesh	Ireland	Sher-e-Bangla National Cricket Stadium, Dhaka, Bangladesh	19 November 2025	Won	
Last updated: 20 November 2025
