= Australian cricket team in South Africa in 2013–14 =

International cricket tour

Australian cricket team in South Africa in 2014
	Australia	South Africa
- Dates: 12 February 2014 – 14 March 2014
Captains	Michael Clarke (Tests); George Bailey (T20Is)	Graeme Smith (Tests); Faf du Plessis (T20Is)

Test series
- Result: Australia won the 3-match series 2–1
Most runs	David Warner (543)	AB de Villiers (341)
Most wickets	Mitchell Johnson (22)	Dale Steyn (12)
- Player of the series: David Warner (Aus)

Twenty20 International series
- Results: Australia won the 3-match series 2–0
Most runs	Aaron Finch (44)	Quinton de Kock (82)
Most wickets	Glenn Maxwell (2); Brad Hogg (2); Mitchell Starc (2)	Imran Tahir (2); Jean-Paul Duminy (2); Wayne Parnell (2)
- Player of the series: Quinton de Kock (SA)

The Australia cricket team toured South Africa, playing three Test matches and a three-match Twenty20 series against the South African national team from 12 February to 14 March 2014. On 3 March 2014, South African captain Graeme Smith announced that he would retire from international cricket after the third Test. Australia won the Test series 2–1 and the T20 series 2–0. Australian captain Michael Clarke scored 161 not out in the third Test, playing with a fractured shoulder.

== Squads ==
Tests
South Africa	Australia
Graeme Smith (c); AB de Villiers, (wk); Kyle Abbott; Hashim Amla; Jean-Paul Duminy; Quinton de Kock; Faf du Plessis; Dean Elgar; Rory Kleinveldt; Ryan McLaren; Morne Morkel; Wayne Parnell; Alviro Petersen; Robin Peterson; Vernon Philander; Dale Steyn; Thami Tsolekile	Michael Clarke (c); Brad Haddin (vc, wk); Jackson Bird; Alex Doolan; Ryan Harris; Moises Henriques; Phillip Hughes; Mitchell Johnson; Nathan Lyon; Shaun Marsh; James Pattinson; Chris Rogers; Peter Siddle; Steve Smith; David Warner; Shane Watson

== Test series ==
=== 1st Test ===
12–16 February 2014
Scorecard

Australia	v	South Africa
397 (122 overs); Shaun Marsh 148 (288); Dale Steyn 4/78 (29 overs)		206 (61.1 overs); AB de Villiers 91 (148); Mitchell Johnson 7/68 (17.1 overs)
290/4d (72.2 overs); David Warner 115 (151); Dale Steyn 2/61 (14.2 overs)		200 (59.4 overs); AB de Villiers 48 (90); Mitchell Johnson 5/59 (16 overs)

Australia won by 281 runs
Centurion Park, Centurion
Umpires: Aleem Dar (Pak) and Richard Illingworth (Eng)
Player of the match: Mitchell Johnson (Aus)

- South Africa won the toss and elected to field.
- Alex Doolan (Aus) made his Test debut.

=== 2nd Test ===
20–24 February 2014
Scorecard

South Africa	v	Australia
423 (150.5 overs); Jean-Paul Duminy 123 (231); Nathan Lyon 5/130 (46 overs)		246 (57 overs); David Warner 70 (78); Morné Morkel 3/63 (17 overs)
270/5d (64 overs); Hashim Amla 127 (176)*; Mitchell Johnson 2/51 (15 overs)		216 (73.4 overs); Chris Rogers 107 (237); Dale Steyn 4/55 (20 overs)

South Africa won by 231 runs
St George's Park, Port Elizabeth
Umpires: Kumar Dharmasena (SL) and Richard Illingworth (Eng)
Player of the match: Jean-Paul Duminy (SA)

- South Africa won the toss and elected to bat.
- Quinton de Kock (SA) made his Test debut.

=== 3rd Test ===
1–5 March 2014
Scorecard

Australia	v	South Africa
494/7d (127.4 overs); Michael Clarke 161* (301); Jean-Paul Duminy 4/73 (17 overs)		287 (82.5 overs); Faf du Plessis 67 (171); Mitchell Johnson 4/42 (19 overs)
303/5d (58 overs); David Warner 145 (156); Kyle Abbott 3/61 (14 overs)		265 (134.3 overs); Vernon Philander 51* (99); Ryan Harris 4/32 (24.3 overs)

Australia won by 245 runs
Newlands, Cape Town
Umpires: Aleem Dar (Pak) and Kumar Dharmasena (SL)
Player of the match: David Warner (Aus)

- Australia won the toss and elected to bat.
- Rain stopped play on day 2.
- This was Graeme Smith's final Test match and his last International match.

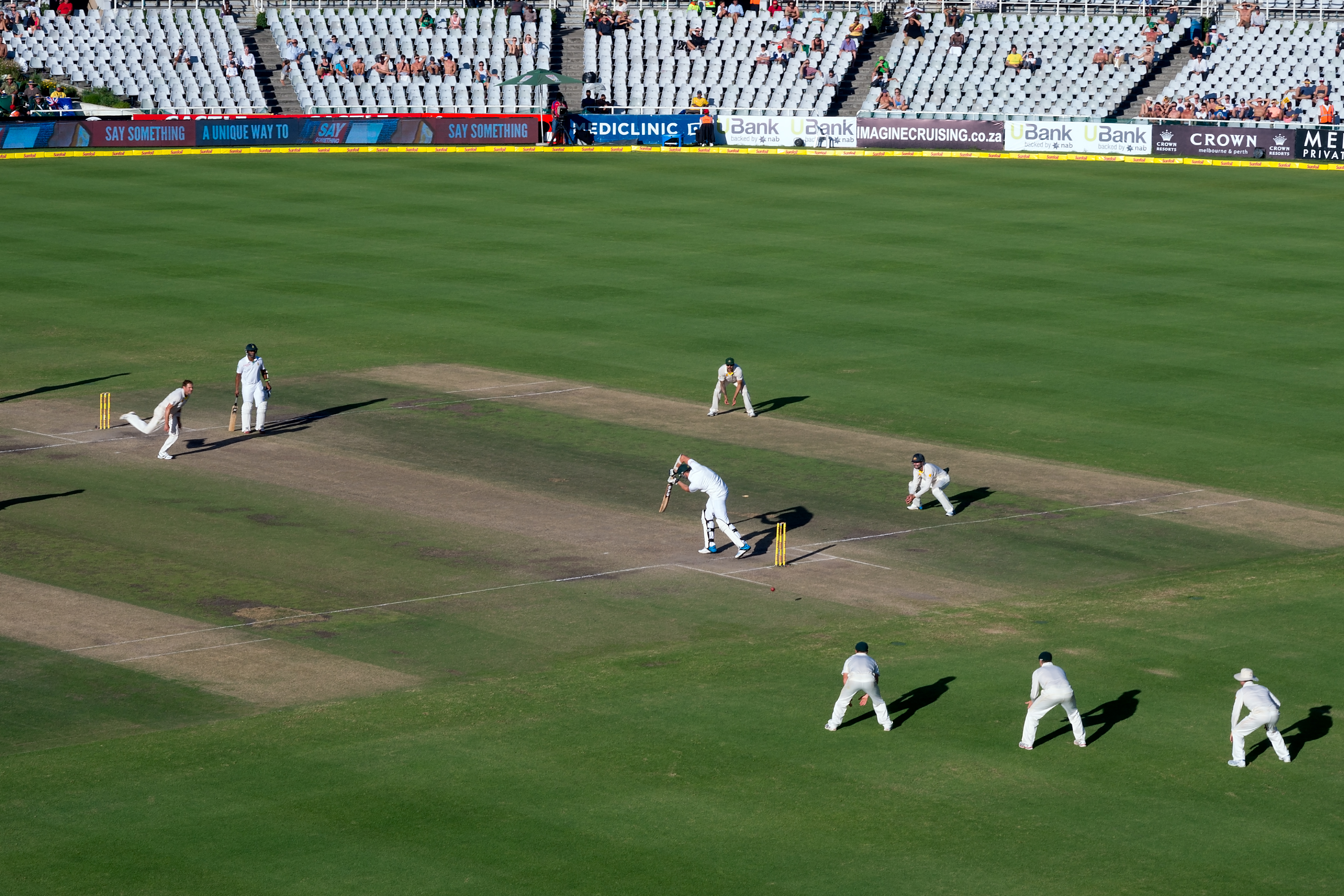
Ryan Harris bowls Morne Morkel to secure victory and a Test series win for Australia

== T20I series ==
=== 1st T20I ===
9 March 2014
14:30
Scorecard

South Africa	v	Australia

Match abandoned
St George's Park, Port Elizabeth
Umpires: Johan Cloete (SA) and Adrian Holdstock (SA)

- Australia won the toss and elected to field.
- Match abandoned without a ball bowled due to rain.

=== 2nd T20I ===
12 March 2014
18:00 (D/N)
Scorecard

South Africa; 80/1 (7 overs)	v	Australia; 82/5 (6.4 overs)
Quinton de Kock 41* (20); Nathan Coulter-Nile 1/17 (2 overs)		David Warner 40 (16); Jean-Paul Duminy 2/5 (1 over)

Australia won by 5 wickets
Kingsmead, Durban
Umpires: Shaun George (RSA) and Adrian Holdstock (RSA)
Player of the match: Brad Hodge (Aus)

- Australia won the toss and elected to field.
- Match reduced to seven overs per side due to rain.
- Beuran Hendricks (SA) made his T20 international debut.

=== 3rd T20I ===
14 March 2014
18:00 (D/N)
Scorecard

South Africa; 128/7 (20 overs)	v	Australia; 129/4 (15 overs)
Quinton de Kock 41 (40); Mitchell Starc 2/16 (4 overs)		Aaron Finch 39 (27); Imran Tahir 2/21 (4 overs)

Australia won by 6 wickets
Centurion Park, Centurion
Umpires: Johan Cloete (RSA) and Shaun George (RSA)
Player of the match: Mitchell Starc (Aus)

- Australia won the toss and elected to field.

== Statistics ==
Australia

- David Warner passed 2,000 Test runs in the second innings of the 1st Test.
- Brad Haddin passed 3,000 Test runs in the second innings of the 2nd Test.
- Chris Rogers passed 1,000 Test runs in the second innings of the 3rd Test.
- Ryan Harris took his 100th Test wicket in the fourth innings of the 3rd Test.

South Africa

- Hashim Amla passed 6,000 Test runs in the second innings of the 1st Test.
- AB de Villiers passed 7,000 Test runs in the first innings of the 2nd Test.
- Jean-Paul Duminy passed 1,000 Test runs in the first innings of the 2nd Test.
