= Garnett Kruger =

South African cricketer (born 1977)

Personal information
- Full name: Garnett John-Peter Kruger
- Born: 5 January 1977 (age 49); Port Elizabeth, Cape Province
- Batting: Right-handed
- Bowling: Right-arm medium-fast
- Role: Bowler

International information
- National side: South Africa (2006)
- ODI debut (cap 81): 15 January 2006 v Australia
- Last ODI: 20 January 2006 v Australia
- Only T20I (cap 16): 9 January 2006 v Australia

Domestic team information
- Years: Team
- 1997/98–2002/03: Eastern Province
- 2003/04: Gauteng
- 2003/04–2008/09: Highveld Lions
- 2007–2008: Leicestershire
- 2009: Glamorgan (squad no. 3)
- 2009/10–2011/12: Warriors
- 2012/13–2013/14: North West
- 2012/13: Highveld Lions

Career statistics
Competition	ODI	T20I	FC	LA
Matches	3	1	137	145
Runs scored	0	3	1,224	187
Batting average	0.00	3.00	10.64	8.13
100s/50s	0/0	0/0	0/2	0/0
Top score	0*	3	58	24*
Balls bowled	138	24	23,766	6,129
Wickets	2	0	450	195
Bowling average	69.50	–	29.67	25.63
5 wickets in innings	0	–	19	4
10 wickets in match	0	–	2	0
Best bowling	1/43	–	8/112	6/23
Catches/stumpings	1/–	0/–	32/–	22/–
- Source: Cricinfo, 10 January 2023

Garnett John-Peter Kruger (born 5 January 1977) is a South African cricketer. Kruger started his first-class cricket career in 1997–98 for Eastern Province B, moving up to the A team in 1999–2000. In 2003–04 he played for Gauteng, before moving to the Lions on the reorganisation of South African first-class cricket in 2004–05. Although he was called to the Test team in 2003–04, he did not make the final team. In 2005–06 he made his debut as an international cricketer, in the one-off Twenty20 International against Australia, and he also played in three One Day Internationals on the same tour.

Kruger represented English team Leicestershire in the 2007 and 2008 seasons as a Kolpak player and performed well in leading a young bowling attack. Kruger left the county at the end of the 2008 season claiming he was concerned about the workload of playing domestic cricket all year around. However, in December 2008 he signed for Glamorgan, becoming the county's first Kolpak player.

In the past Kruger has been heavily critical of SA Cricket.
