= André Nel =

South African cricketer

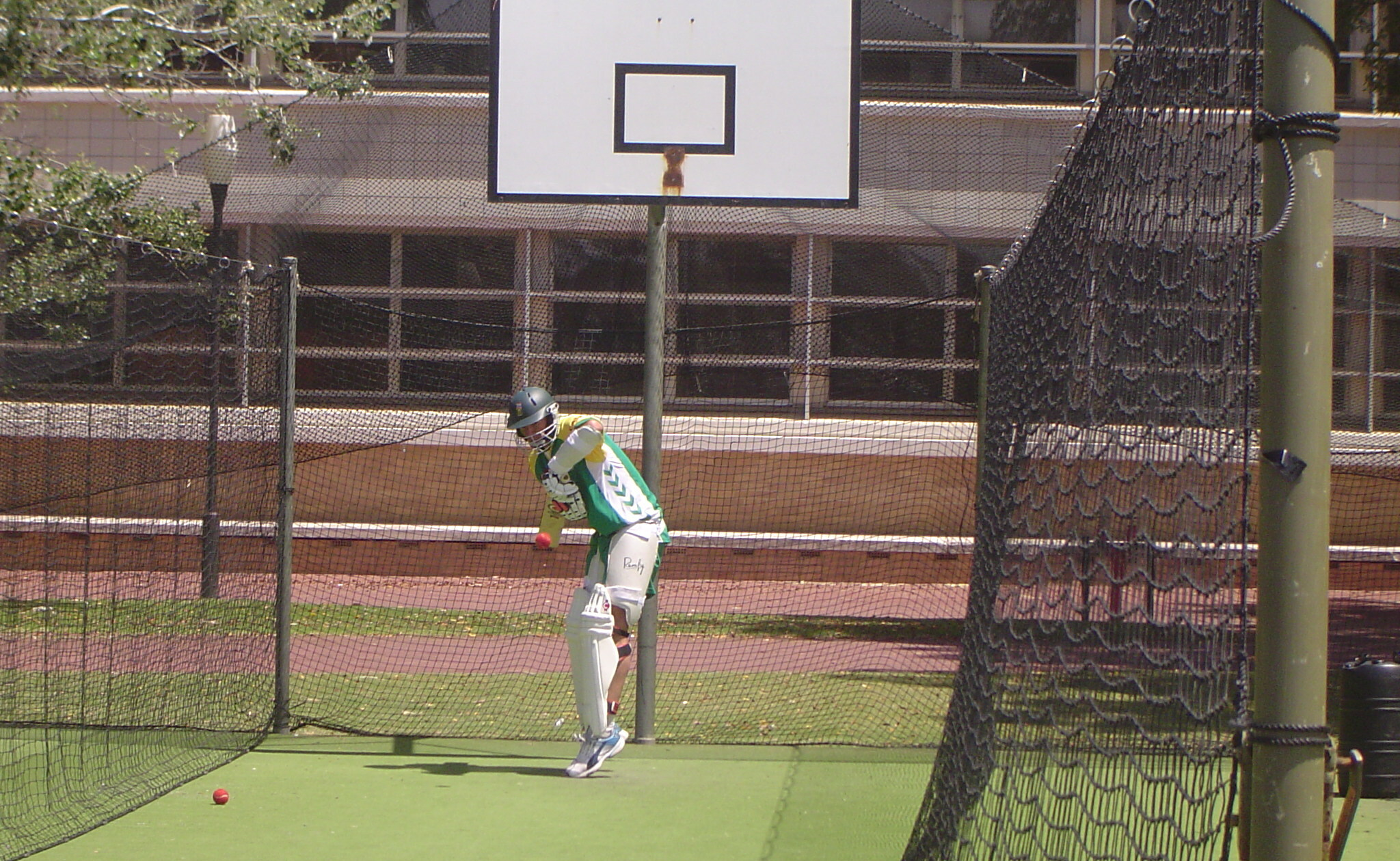
- In the nets in Australia, 2005

Personal information
- Full name: André Nel
- Born: 15 July 1977 (age 49); Germiston, South Africa
- Height: 6 ft 4 in (1.93 m)
- Batting: Right-handed
- Bowling: Right–arm fast-medium
- Role: Bowler

International information
- National side: South Africa (2001–2008)
- Test debut (cap 281): 7 September 2001 v Zimbabwe
- Last Test: 7 August 2008 v England
- ODI debut (cap 65): 12 May 2001 v West Indies
- Last ODI: 3 September 2008 v England
- T20I debut (cap 8): 21 October 2005 v New Zealand
- Last T20I: 19 September 2008 v New Zealand

Domestic team information
- Years: Team
- Northamptonshire
- Essex
- 2008: Mumbai Indians
- Southern Rocks
- Highveld Lions
- Surrey
- Titans

Career statistics
Competition	Test	ODI	T20I
Matches	36	79	2
Runs scored	337	127	0
Batting average	9.91	12.70	–
100s/50s	0/0	0/0	–
Top score	34	30*	–
Balls bowled	7,630	3,801	48
Wickets	123	106	2
Bowling average	31.86	27.68	21.00
5 wickets in innings	3	1	0
10 wickets in match	1	0	0
Best bowling	6/32	5/45	2/19
Catches/stumpings	16/–	21/–	1/–
- Source: CricketArchive, 29 September 2017

André Nel (born 15 July 1977) is a South African former cricketer who played all formats as a fast bowler. He retired from international cricket on 25 March 2009.

== Domestic career ==
In February 2001 he hit the headlines after bursting into tears when he felled Allan Donald with a fiery bouncer in a domestic first-class match. It emerged later that he had been following instructions from his coach Ray Jennings to target Donald.

After the 2007 Cricket World Cup, carrying a respected reputation for aggressive play, Nel joined the English County of Essex, making his debut for the 2005 and 2006 Pro 40 Champions against the side he first experienced the English game with, Northamptonshire.

Nel was signed by Mumbai Indians, an Indian Premier League franchise. He joined the Mumbai Indians as a replacement to West Indian cricketer, Dwayne Bravo, who returned home for national duty after the game against Deccan Chargers on 18 May 2008.

== International career ==
In January 2005 against England he took 6/81 in the first innings of the Test. These remained his best innings bowling figures until South Africa's tour of the West Indies in April 2005 when in the 3rd Test at Kensington Oval he took 6/32 to go with his first innings 4 wickets. This gave him his first 10 wicket haul in Test cricket and he was subsequently named man of the match.

Nel went on to take 14 wickets during his side's tour of Australia later in 2005, finishing the year with 36 victims at 20.72. He troubled Brian Lara in Test cricket and dismissed him on 8 occasions.

In the first Test of the Bank Alfalah Test Series versus Pakistan in Karachi, Nel became the 11th South African to reach the milestone of 100 dismissals in Test cricket, when he dismissed the Pakistani nightwatchman, Mohammad Asif on 5 October 2007.

In early 2008, paceman of colour Charl Langeveldt was controversially selected in the Test team for tour of India, at the expense of Nel. This was widely believed to be due to an order from Cricket South Africa to select more non-white players in the team as part of its transformation policy, rather than performance. Langeveldt declined his selection, citing the controversy over the selection, and Nel was reported to have been considering retirement.

His enthusiastic and aggressive approach on the field also got him into trouble. He was notably brought before the Match referee for making offensive facial gestures to West Indian players Chris Gayle and Brian Lara, for which he was subsequently fined half of his match fee.

== Personal life ==
In 2001 during the tour of the West Indies he, along with four other teammates, was found guilty of smoking marijuana.

During 2003 he was sent home from a South Africa A tour of Australia after being pulled over for drunk driving.

On 17 January 2004, Nel got married during the second day of the fourth Test against the West Indies.

After retiring, Nel became a cricket coach in England.
