= Graeme Smith =

South African cricketer (born 1981)

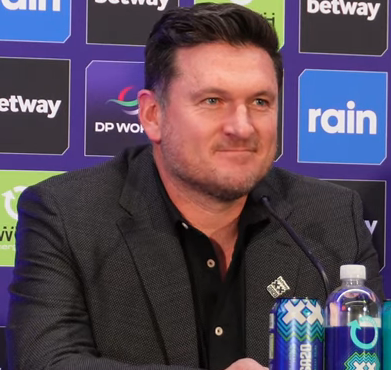
- Smith in 2025

Personal information
- Full name: Graeme Craig Smith
- Born: 1 February 1981 (age 45); Johannesburg, Transvaal Province, South Africa
- Nickname: Biff
- Height: 6 ft 3 in (1.91 m)
- Batting: Left-handed
- Bowling: Right arm off break
- Role: Opening batsman

International information
- National side: South Africa (2002–2014)
- Test debut (cap 288): 8 March 2002 v Australia
- Last Test: 1 March 2014 v Australia
- ODI debut (cap 68): 30 March 2002 v Australia
- Last ODI: 27 November 2013 v Pakistan
- ODI shirt no.: 15
- T20I debut (cap 12): 21 October 2005 v New Zealand
- Last T20I: 16 October 2011 v Australia
- T20I shirt no.: 15

Domestic team information
- Years: Team
- 1999/2000: Gauteng
- 2000: Hampshire
- 2000/01–2003/04: Western Province
- 2004/05–2014: Cape Cobras
- 2005: Somerset
- 2008–2010: Rajasthan Royals
- 2011: Pune Warriors India
- 2013–2014: Surrey

Career statistics
Competition	Test	ODI	T20I	FC
Matches	117	197	33	165
Runs scored	9,265	6,989	982	12,916
Batting average	48.25	37.98	31.67	48.73
100s/50s	27/38	10/47	0/5	37/51
Top score	277	141	89*	311
Balls bowled	1,418	1,026	24	1,786
Wickets	8	18	0	11
Bowling average	110.62	52.83	–	102.90
5 wickets in innings	0	0	–	0
10 wickets in match	0	0	–	0
Best bowling	2/145	3/30	–	2/145
Catches/stumpings	169/–	105/–	18/–	241/–
- Source: ESPNcricinfo, 18 May 2014

Graeme Craig Smith (born 1 February 1981) is a South African cricket commentator and former cricketer who played for South Africa in all formats. In 2003, he was appointed captain of the national team, taking over from Shaun Pollock. He held the position of Test captain until his retirement in 2014. At 22, he was appointed as South Africa's youngest ever captain. He was the most capped captain ever when he played his 102nd match against England. He is considered one of South Africa's greatest captains, having led South Africa to a record 54 Test victories.

A tall, left-handed opening batsman, Smith is regarded as one of the greatest openers of all time. During South Africa's tour of England in 2003, he made double centuries in consecutive Test matches: 277 at Edgbaston and 259 at Lord's, the latter the highest score made by a foreign player at this venue. On 24 October 2013, Smith became the second South African and 12th overall to complete 9,000 Test runs in his 112th test match. His highest score in ODI cricket which was his 141 he made against England in the 2009 ICC Champions Trophy is also the highest score made by a South African at any tournaments.

Known for the success of his opening partnership with Herschelle Gibbs, South Africa's most prolific ever opening partnership, Smith has the distinction of having been part of all four of South Africa's opening partnerships of over 300 runs: in three of them he was partnered by Gibbs, and in 2008 Smith added 415 for the first wicket with Neil McKenzie against Bangladesh, a world record opening partnership. On 3 March 2014, during the third Test against Australia, he announced his retirement from international cricket.

He was also the overseas player and captain of the English side Surrey. He appeared in his 100th Test against England on 19 July 2012. He captained his 100th career Test match on 1 February 2013, against Pakistan, on his 32nd birthday. He's the only player to captain a side in 100 Tests.

He was appointed the SA20 League Commissioner.

== Early and personal life ==
Born and raised in Johannesburg to Scottish parents Graham and Janet, Smith was educated at King Edward VII School. Smith played three Tests, and seven One Day Internationals for South Africa under-19s, of which five were during the Under 19 Cricket World Cup. He scored one fifty in the Test matches, but scored five half-centuries in the one-dayers. Smith was also one of the South African Cricketers of the Year in the South African Cricket Annual for his performances in the 2001–02 South African cricket season.

Smith married Irish singer Morgan Deane, at St Bernard Catholic Church in Claremont, Cape Town in August 2011. Their daughter, Cadence Christine Smith, was born 25 July 2012. and their son, Carter McMorrin Smith, was born on 15 July 2013. On 18 February 2015, Graeme and Morgan publicly announced that they would be divorcing after four years of marriage. On 24 December 2016, Smith's girlfriend Romy Lanfranchi gave birth to Smith's third child, a boy.

Smith is also an ardent Liverpool F.C. supporter.

== Domestic career ==
Graeme Smith has played for several cricket teams in South Africa. He latterly played for the Cape Cobras but due to his international commitments, his appearances for them were limited, his last first-class game for them being in 2010. In total he has played 17 games for Western Province scoring 1,312 runs with four centuries at an average of 46.85. He has also played for other teams in South Africa including the United Cricket Board of South Africa Invitation XI and Western Province Boland.

He has also played county cricket for Somerset in the 2005 English cricket season, captaining the club for part of the 2005 season, and he scored a century in a tour match against the Australians in preparation for the 2005 Ashes series. Against Leicestershire at Taunton he scored his maiden first-class triple hundred (311 off 255 balls). He also hit 105 in the Twenty20 Cup match against Northamptonshire, which is currently the 15th highest score in the domestic Twenty20 Cup competition. Smith also captained the team to victory on finals day to secure the Twenty20 Cup trophy, making 64 not out from 47 balls in the final.

In 2008 Graeme Smith played in the inaugural Indian Premier League for Rajasthan Royals. His opening partnership with Swapnil Asnodkar achieved significant success. "You can know an opponent as a cricketer," Royals captain Shane Warne, with whom Smith had had multiple dustups in the past, wrote afterward, "but you only start to know him as a bloke when you play in the same side. As it turned out, the Graeme Smith I played alongside for the Rajasthan Royals in 2008 was different from the Graeme Smith I faced in the Test arena. That was the great thing about the Indian Premier League. It brought together players from all countries to share ideas, swap experiences, and take the game forward worldwide. We had a laugh and a joke about the things we had said in the past. They sounded quite funny looking back. I know he has a few regrets, but, all credit to him, he sees the funny side."

On 1 November 2012 Graeme Smith was announced as the new captain of Surrey County Cricket Club starting in the 2013 season. He received his county cap at lunch on day 1 of the first championship fixture of the 2013 season against Somerset.

== International career ==
Smith made his Test debut for South Africa in 2002 in Cape Town against Australia, batting at number three and scoring 68 in the second innings. Promoted to open the batting with Herschelle Gibbs against Bangladesh in his third Test match, Smith scored 200. In the following home series against Pakistan, Smith (who scored 151) and Gibbs (228) shared a first-wicket stand of 368, a national record until bettered by Smith and Neil McKenzie's 415, and at the time the fourth highest opening partnership in Test history. Following the 2003 Cricket World Cup and Shaun Pollock's subsequent resignation, Smith was selected as captain for South Africa's next Test. The decision was criticised as it was felt that he had shown 'few leadership credentials': He had played only eight Tests and 22 ODIs before being given the captaincy. Smith was only 22 years and 82 days old when he captained his first match against Bangladesh, the youngest ever South African captain.

During the tour of England in 2003 he made double centuries in consecutive Tests, with 277 at Edgbaston and 259 at Lord's. His 277 remained the highest individual Test innings scored by a South African until November 2010, surpassing the previous record of 275 held jointly by Daryll Cullinan and Gary Kirsten; his 259 remains the highest score made at Lord's by a foreign player, breaking the record of 254 set by Sir Donald Bradman in 1930. These performances prompted Alec Stewart to call him "the most impressive 22-year-old I have seen in cricket"; the Edgbaston match prompted Nasser Hussain to retire as captain of England, to be succeeded by Michael Vaughan. This outstanding run of form could have continued but for an unusual dismissal: in the third Test at Trent Bridge Smith, on 35, played back to Andrew Flintoff and trod on his stumps to be dismissed hit wicket. Smith did not pass 20 again in the series as a galvanized England led by Vaughan won the match and fought back to draw the series 2–2, but Smith nonetheless finished the series with an aggregate of 714 runs at an average of 79.33, and was named player of the series (jointly with Flintoff).

During the year 2004 South Africa had a significantly less successful run in ODI cricket than they would have expected, with a 5–1 series loss to New Zealand and a 5–0 series loss to Sri Lanka. They had beaten the West Indies 3–1 earlier in the year, but South African cricket was described as being in a state of 'freefall'. In Test matches, South Africa suffered a poor run with series losses to England, India, and Sri Lanka. They did nevertheless win a home Test series against the West Indies (with Smith and Gibbs sharing their third 300-run opening partnership).

G.Smith's results in international matches
	Matches	Won	Lost	Drawn	Tied	No result
Test	117	60	30	27	0	–
ODI	197	115	73	-	2	7
T20I	33	23	10	–	-	-

Although initially regarded as an inexperienced captain, his growth in the role was evidenced when he was selected to captain the ICC World XI in the ICC Super Series Test Match between the ICC World XI and Australia in October 2005.

South Africa won a Test series in the West Indies in 2005, with Smith scoring centuries in three consecutive matches: 148 at the Queen's Park Oval, 104 at the Kensington Oval and 126 at Antigua. However, their tour of Australia and Australia's subsequent return tour in the 2005–06 season were disappointments for Smith, as they succumbed to a 2–0 defeat in Australia, and a 3–0 whitewash at home. Yet, for his performances in 2005, he was named in the World Test XI by ICC. Pride was restored when Smith led his team to victory in South Africa's win over Australia in a One Day International at the Wanderers Stadium, Johannesburg, on 12 March 2006. Australia set South Africa a world record 434–4 from 50 overs, which was successfully chased by South Africa who reached 438–9 with a ball to spare. Smith scored 90 runs off 55 balls in the chase, and shared in a second-wicket partnership of 187 runs with Herschelle Gibbs. The result gave South Africa in a 3–2 series victory over the Australians.

In the first ODI against Pakistan on 4 February 2007, Smith hit an over bowled by Naved-ul-Hasan for 27 runs, and became the first player in ODI history to hit six fours off an over; Smith scored 72 from 47 balls as South Africa totaled 392–6, the highest ODI total ever made against a Test nation (excluding Zimbabwe) apart from the two innings of the aforementioned Wanderers match between Australia and South Africa. As captain he led the South African cricket team through 20 consecutive undefeated matches in One Day Internationals in 2005. In early 2007 Smith's South Africans replaced Australia on top of the official ICC rankings for ODI cricket but returned to second place after mixed results in the 2007 ICC World Cup thus far after losing to Australia by eight wickets. In the 2007 World Cup, he started the tournament with four successive 50s, a feat never before achieved by a captain.

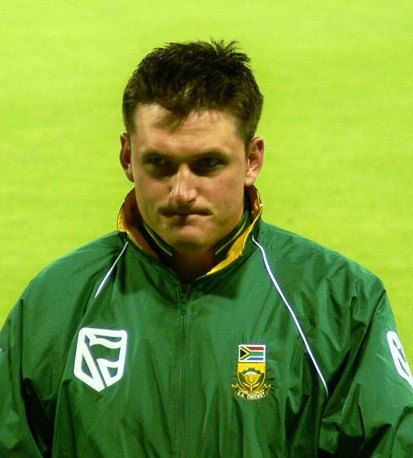
Smith in 2010.

During the second Test against Bangladesh at Chittagong in begun on 29 February 2008 Smith (who scored 232) and Neil McKenzie (226) put on a world record 415 for the first wicket. The partnership beat the previous first-wicket record of 413 which had been set in 1956 by Vinoo Mankad and Pankaj Roy. They had finished day one with 405 runs on the board which was the most ever put on by a pair in a single day of Test cricket without losing a wicket. The partnership was Smith's fourth opening partnership of over 300 runs, and his sixth of over 200 runs, both Test records.

In scoring 108 in the second innings of the first Test against England at Lord's in 2008, Smith participated in a seventh double-century opening partnership, again in conjunction with McKenzie, as South Africa fought to draw a Test which appeared lost. He also scored a second-innings 154 not out in the third Test at Edgbaston, to lead South Africa to a challenging target of 281, and with it South Africa's first series victory in England since 1965. The result provided Smith with personal vengeance against Michael Vaughan for denying South Africa a series victory in England in 2003 and defeating South Africa at home in 2004–5; Vaughan resigned as captain of England after the Edgbaston match, in an echo of Nasser Hussain's resignation at the instigation of Smith's batting five years earlier.

South Africa would later on go to Australia for a Test and one-day series that was billed as the 'heavyweight' series. It was the world champions Australia taking on the number two side South Africa with the series winner becoming world champions. In the first Test match at Perth, South Africa chased down 414 runs with 6 wickets in hand. This was the second-largest fourth innings total that was chased down in history and the highest on Australian soil. Graeme Smith broke his Australian hoodoo by leading from the front and scoring 108, his first century against Australia. He would also share a partnership with Hashim Amla.

In December 2008 he captained the first South African side to win a Test series against Australia on their soil, in the course inflicting the first home defeat on the opponents in 16 years. On 7 January 2009, in the third match, Smith received a standing ovation from the crowd when he batted in the second innings despite a broken hand in an attempt to save the match. He was dismissed with ten balls remaining and Australia won the Test.

For his performances in 2008, he was named as captain of the World Test XI by ICC and ESPNcricinfo.

After South Africa lost to New Zealand in the quarter-finals of the 2011 World Cup, Smith resigned as ODI and Twenty20 captain. He was replaced by AB de Villiers. Smith had to recover from an ankle injury to face England in three-Test series in 2012. The first match was his 100th Test and he became the seventh batsman to score a century in his 100th Test. By beating England in the first and third matches and drawing the second – he led South Africa to a series victory. This put South Africa back on top of the ICC Test rankings. And with England Test cricket captain Andrew Strauss retiring from all forms of cricket right after this defeat, Graeme Smith achieved a rare feat of toppling three English captains in three tours to England.

For his performances in 2012, he was named in Test XI of the year by ESPNcricinfo.

In October 2019, he was elected as an honorary life member of the Marylebone Cricket Club in recognition of his outstanding achievement in Cricket.

=== Captaincy ===
G.Smith's record as captain
	Matches	Won	Lost	Drawn	Tied	No result
Test	108	53	28	27	0	–
ODI	149	92	51	–	1	5
T20I	27	18	9	–	-	-

He is the most successful Test captain in test history (53 wins) and also the only captain to have registered 50+ victories. He's the only player to captain a team in 100 Tests.

== Coaching career ==
He was appointed as director of cricket for South Africa national cricket team in mid December 2019 initially on a temporary three-month stint and after the three-month stint in an interim capacity as director of cricket, he was also slated for commentary role for the 2020 Indian Premier League. However, in April 2020, following the postponement of the IPL owing to COVID-19 concerns, his contract as director of CSA was extended to further two years up until March 2022. His three-year tenure as director of South African team ended on 31 March 2022 with immediate effect. Smith decided not to reapply for the post following the outcome of SJN Hearings.

== Controversies ==
During a Test series against South Africa in 2005, Trinidadian Dwayne Bravo scored his maiden century before getting out to Mark Boucher in the fourth match in Antigua, but that achievement was overshadowed when he accused Smith of directing a racist comment at him. At the subsequent hearing no evidence could be found and charges were dropped against Smith, who immediately demanded an apology from Bravo. Bravo, backed by the West Indies Cricket Board, refused to do so and received a hail of criticism from an indignant South African press while finding support at home as a human rights campaigner.

=== SJN Hearings on racism allegations ===
In 2021, he was accused of racism allegations during his playing career and the matter was taken into consideration at the Cricket South Africa's (CSA) Social Justice and Nation Building (SJN) transformation public hearings. He was among several employees of CSA to be implicated in tentative findings made by SJN ombudsman. The report claimed that he had engaged in racially biased and discriminatory behavior on three counts during his tenure as captain of South African Test side and during his three-year run as CSA's director of cricket.

As the report claims, he was accused of causing a roadblock to wicketkeeper batsman Thami Tsolekile when he was on the verge of taking over the keeping duties from Boucher as Boucher's international career was cut short prematurely due to an eye injury. Smith paved way for AB de Villiers to become the designated wicketkeeper of the side ahead of Tsolekile despite the fact that de Villiers being only a specialist keeper for the Test series against England in 2012. Moreover, Smith was also alleged to have been appointed as the director of cricket of Cricket South Africa in contrast to the CSA's recruitment policy. It was revealed that the then CEO of CSA Thabang Moroe headhunted Smith to appointed him as director of cricket despite the interviewing process for the relevant job position was still taking place.

However, Smith was cleared of racism allegations by two independent arbitrators who indicated there was neither evidence of racial bias nor that Smith had engaged in racial discrimination. CSA has also been ordered to pay Smith's costs for the arbitration process.

== Records ==
- Smith holds the world record of captaining in most Tests. He is also the only captain to play in excess of 100 Tests (109 – 108 as captain for South Africa and 1 for ICC).
- Smith holds the world record of the highest number of wins in Test matches as captain (53).
- Smith holds the most centuries (15) by a captain in Test match wins.
- He also holds the world record of a non-wicketkeeper taking most catches (82) in Test wins.
- Fastest South African cricketer to reach 1,000 Test runs.
- Smith holds the record for scoring the most Test runs as captain (8659).
- He along with Jacques Kallis set the record for the highest ever partnership for any wicket as debutants in T20 Internationals (84 for the 1st wicket)

== See also ==
- List of international cricket centuries by Graeme Smith

Sporting positions
Preceded by Shaun Pollock	South African Test cricket captain 2003–2014 (Ashwell Prince deputised 2005/6–2006/7)	Succeeded by Hashim Amla
Preceded by Shaun Pollock	South African ODI cricket captain 2003–2011	Succeeded by AB de Villiers
Preceded by Post created	South African T20I cricket captain 2005–2010	Succeeded by Johan Botha
Preceded by Mike Burns	Somerset County Cricket Captain; 2005	Succeeded by Ian Blackwell
Preceded by Gareth Batty	Surrey County Cricket Captain; 2013–2014	Succeeded by Gareth Batty
