= List of Australia One Day International cricket records =

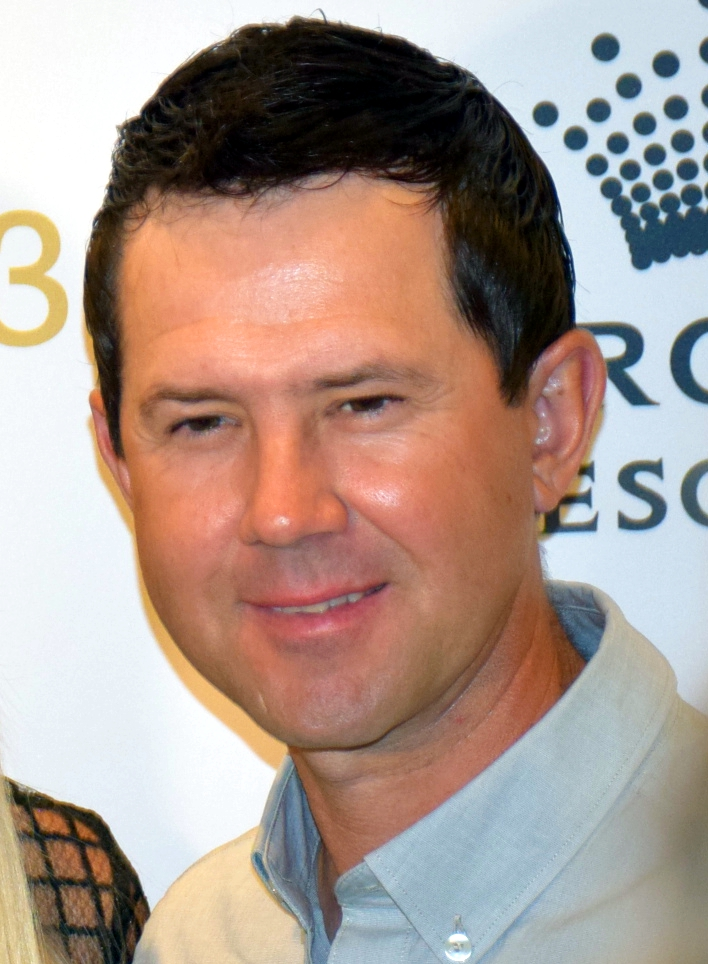
Former captain Ricky Ponting holds several Australian ODI cricket records.

One Day International (ODI) cricket is one of three forms of cricket played at international level. Unlike Test cricket, ODIs consist of one innings per team and is played over the course of single day. Each innings is limited to a maximum of 50 overs, although previously this has been 55 or 60 overs. Matches are played by the twelve teams representing full member nations of the International Cricket Council (ICC), each of which have permanent ODI status, as well as the eight Associate members of the ICC that currently have temporary ODI status. Australia played in the inaugural ODI match against England on 5 January 1971 at the Melbourne Cricket Ground. They have played a total of 975 matches, second only to India who have played 1,020. As of December 2022, Australia is the most third-most successful team in ODI cricket with an overall winning percentage of 63.39, behind the ACC Asia XI on 66.66 percent and South Africa on 63.41.

Top order batsman and former captain Ricky Ponting holds several Australian ODI cricket records. Playing between 1995 and 2012, he scored 13,589 runs, making him the only Australian player to score 10,000 ODI runs. He has scored a record 82 half-centuries and 29 centuries. As a slip fielder, Ponting has also taken the most catches for Australia with 159. Captaining his side from 2002 until his retirement in 2012, Ponting holds the ODI record for the most matches played as captain with 230 (Note: This total includes the 2005 World Cricket Tsunami Appeal match where he captained the ICC World XI against the ACC Asia XI.) and the record for the most matches played for Australia with 374.

Fast bowlers Glenn McGrath and Brett Lee share the record for the most ODI wickets taken for Australia with 380. McGrath also holds the record for the best figures taken by an Australian in an ODI match with 7/15 while Lee holds the Australian ODI record for the most five-wicket hauls with nine. Adam Gilchrist is Australia's most successful wicket-keeper having taken 470 dismissals and holds the ODI record for the most catches taken as a wicket-keeper with 417. (Note: This total includes the catch he took for the ICC World XI in the World Cricket Tsunami Appeal match against the ACC Asia XI in 2005.) Gilchrist also holds the Australian record for playing 97 consecutive ODI matches between 1997 and 2001.

== Key ==
The top five records are listed for each category, except for the team wins, losses, ties and no results and the partnership records. Tied records for fifth place are also included. Explanations of the general symbols and cricketing terms used in the list are given below. Specific details are provided in each category where appropriate. All records include matches played for Australia only, and are correct as of December 2022.

Key
| Symbol | Meaning |
|---|---|
| † | Player or umpire is currently active in ODI cricket |
| * | Player remained not out or partnership remained unbroken |
| ♠ | One Day International cricket record |
| Date | Date of the ODI match |
| Innings | Number of innings played |
| Matches | Number of matches played |
| Opposition | The team Australia was playing against |
| Period | The time period when the player was active in ODI cricket |
| Player | The player involved in the record |
| Venue | One Day International cricket ground where the match was played |

== Team records ==
=== Overall record ===
| Matches | Won | Lost | Tied | NR | W/L ratio | Win % |
|---|---|---|---|---|---|---|
| 1,000 | 609 | 348 | 9 | 34 | 1.750 | 63.5 |
Last Updated: 7 February 2024

Note: Tied matches considered as half win.

W/L ratio and win % excluded the matches which ended in No result.

=== Team wins, losses, ties and no results ===
As of August 2025, Australia has played 1,017 ODI matches resulting in 615 victories, 357 defeats, 9 ties and 36 no results for an overall winning percentage of 60.47, the third highest winning percentage of ODI playing teams. Australia has played the second-highest number of ODI matches, behind India who have competed in 1,020. Australia has played matches against 18 of the 27 other ODI teams. They have yet to play against the Africa XI, the ACC Asia XI, Bermuda, East Africa, Hong Kong, Nepal, Oman, Papua New Guinea and the United Arab Emirates. Australia has never lost a match against Afghanistan, Ireland or any of the ICC Associate Members that they have played.

| Opposition | First ODI | Matches | Won | Lost | Tied | No result | % Won |
|---|---|---|---|---|---|---|---|
| Afghanistan | 25 August 2012 | 5 | 4 | 0 | 0 | 1 | 80.00 |
| Bangladesh | 30 April 1990 | 23 | 20 | 2 | 0 | 1 | 86.96 |
| Canada | 16 June 1979 | 2 | 2 | 0 | 0 | 0 | 100.00 |
| England | 5 January 1971 | 162 | 92 | 65 | 2 | 3 | 56.79 |
| ICC World XI | 5 October 2005 | 3 | 3 | 0 | 0 | 0 | 100.00 |
| India | 6 December 1980 | 154 | 86 | 58 | 0 | 10 | 55.84 |
| Ireland | 13 April 2007 | 5 | 4 | 0 | 0 | 1 | 100.00 |
| Kenya | 23 February 1996 | 5 | 5 | 0 | 0 | 0 | 100.00 |
| Namibia | 27 February 2003 | 1 | 1 | 0 | 0 | 0 | 100.00 |
| Netherlands | 20 February 2003 | 3 | 3 | 0 | 0 | 0 | 100.00 |
| New Zealand | 30 March 1974 | 142 | 96 | 39 | 0 | 7 | 67.60 |
| Pakistan | 7 June 1975 | 111 | 71 | 36 | 1 | 3 | 63.96 |
| Scotland | 16 May 1999 | 5 | 5 | 0 | 0 | 0 | 100.00 |
| South Africa | 26 February 1992 | 114 | 51 | 57 | 3 | 2 | 44.74 |
| Sri Lanka | 11 June 1975 | 105 | 64 | 37 | 0 | 4 | 60.95 |
| United States | 13 September 2004 | 1 | 1 | 0 | 0 | 0 | 100.00 |
| West Indies | 14 June 1975 | 146 | 79 | 61 | 3 | 3 | 56.29 |
| Zimbabwe | 9 June 1983 | 33 | 29 | 3 | 0 | 1 | 90.62 |
| Total | | 1,019 | 617 | 357 | 9 | 36 | 60.55 |
Last updated:24 August 2025

=== First bilateral ODI series wins ===
| Opponent | Year of first Home win | Year of first Away win |
|---|---|---|
| Bangladesh | 2003 | 2006 |
| England | 1979 | 1981 |
| India | 2016 | 1984 |
| New Zealand | 2007 | 1974 |
| Pakistan | 2010 | 1998 |
| South Africa | 2014 | 1997 |
| Sri Lanka | - | 2004 |
| West Indies | 2010 | 1991 |
| Zimbabwe | 2022 | 1999 |
Last updated: 13 May 2023

=== First ODI match wins ===
| Opponent | Home | | Away / Neutral | |
| Opponent | Venue | Year | Venue | Year |
|---|---|---|---|---|
| Afghanistan | Perth | 2015‡ | Sharjah | 2012 |
| Bangladesh | Cairns | 2003 | Chittagong | 2006 |
| Canada | YTP | YTP | Birmingham | 1979‡ |
| England | Melbourne | 1971 | London | 1972 |
| India | Sydney | 1980 | New Delhi | 1984 |
| Ireland | YTP | YTP | Dublin | 2010 |
| Kenya | YTP | YTP | Nairobi | 2002 |
| Namibia | YTP | YTP | Potchefstroom | 2003‡ |
| Netherlands | YTP | YTP | Potchefstroom | 2003‡ |
| New Zealand | Sydney | 1980 | Dunedin | 1974 |
| Pakistan | Adelaide | 1981 | Lahore | 1987‡ |
| South Africa | Sydney | 1993 | Port Elizabeth | 1994 |
| Sri Lanka | Sydney | 1985 | Colombo | 1992 |
| Scotland | Hobart | 2015‡ | Edinburgh | 2009 |
| West Indies | Adelaide | 1975 | Port of Spain | 1984 |
| Zimbabwe | Hobart | 1992 ‡ | Bulawayo | 1999 |
Last updated: 13 May 2023

=== Team scoring records ===
==== Most runs in an innings ====
The highest innings total scored in ODI cricket came in the series between England and the Netherlands in June 2022. Playing in the first ODI at VRA Cricket Ground, Amstelveen the tourists posted a total of 4/498. This broke the record of 6/481 also set by England at Trent Bridge against Australia three years prior. The fifth ODI of the 2005–06 series against South Africa saw Australia set their highest innings total of 4/434, the eighth-highest score in ODI cricket.

| Rank | Score | Overs | Opposition | Venue | Date |
|---|---|---|---|---|---|
| 1 | 4/434 | 50 | South Africa | Wanderers Stadium, Johannesburg, South Africa | 12 March 2006 |
| 2 | 2/431 | 50 | South Africa | Great Barrier Reef Arena, Mackay, Australia | 24 August 2025 |
| 3 | 6/417 | 50 | Afghanistan | WACA Ground, Perth, Australia | 4 March 2015 |
| 4 | 8/399 | 50 | Netherlands | Arun Jaitley Stadium, Delhi, India | 25 October 2023 ‡ |
| 5 | 8/392 | 50 | South Africa | Mangaung Oval, Bloemfontein, South Africa | 9 September 2023 |
Last updated: 25 October 2022

==== Highest successful run chases ====
South Africa claims the highest successful run chase in ODI cricket when they scored 9/438 chasing a target of 435 runs. This came during the final ODI match of Australia's tour of South Africa in 2005–06 at Wanderers Stadium in Johannesburg. The fourth ODI of the 2018–19 series against India saw Australia achieve their highest successful run chase in the format. Set 359 for victory at Punjab Cricket Association IS Bindra in Mohali, Australia reached the target with 13 balls to spare.

| Rank | Score | Target | Overs | Opposition | Venue | Date |
|---|---|---|---|---|---|---|
| 1 | 6/359 | 359 | 47.5 | India | Punjab Cricket Association IS Bindra, Mohali, India | 10 March 2019 |
| 2 | 5/356 | 352 | 47.3 | England | Gaddafi Stadium, Lahore, Pakistan | 22 February 2025 |
| 3 | 8/334 | 334 | 49.2 | England | Sydney Cricket Ground, Sydney, Australia | 2 February 2011 |
| 4 | 7/330 | 327 | 49.1 | South Africa | St George's Park Cricket Ground, Port Elizabeth, South Africa | 6 April 2002 |
| 5 | 4/316 | 316 | 48.5 | Pakistan | Gaddafi Stadium, Lahore, Pakistan | 10 November 1998 |
Last updated: 31 December 2022

==== Fewest runs in an innings ====
The lowest innings total scored in ODI cricket came in the third ODI of Sri Lanka's tour of Zimbabwe in April 2004. Zimbabwe in the first innings was bowled all out for 35 runs. This record was equalled in February 2020 in the final match of the Nepal Tri-Nation Series where the hosts bowled out the United States. Australia's lowest total of 70 has been set twice. The first came during the second ODI against England in 1977 and again eight years later during the 1985–86 Australian Tri-Series against New Zealand.

| Rank | Score | Overs | Opposition | Venue | Date |
|---|---|---|---|---|---|
| 1 | 70 | 26.3 | New Zealand | Adelaide Oval, Adelaide, Australia | 27 January 1986 |
| 2 | 70 | 25.2 | England | Edgbaston, Birmingham, England | 4 June 1977 |
| 3 | 74 | 26.4 | Sri Lanka | The Gabba, Brisbane, Australia | 18 January 2013 |
| 4 | 91 | 35.4 | West Indies | WACA Ground, Perth, Australia | 4 January 1987 |
| 5 | 93 | 34.3 | South Africa | Newlands Cricket Ground, Cape Town, South Africa | 3 March 2006 |
Last updated: 31 December 2022

==== Most runs conceded in an innings ====
Australia conceded the highest total of 481 against England in 2018. At that time, It was highest One Day International score for any team later it was broken by England once again by scoring 498 against Netherlands in 2022.

| Rank | Score | Opposition | Venue | Date |
|---|---|---|---|---|
| 1 | 6/481 | England | Trent Bridge, Nottingham, England | 19 June 2018 |
| 2 | 9/438 | South Africa | Wanderers Stadium, Johannesburg, South Africa | 12 March 2006 |
| 3 | 5/416 | South Africa | Centurion Park, Centurion, South Africa | 15 September 2023 |
| 4 | 5/399 | India | Holkar Cricket Stadium, Indore, India | 24 September 2023 |
| 5 | 6/383 | India | M. Chinnaswamy Stadium, Bengaluru, India | 2 November 2013 |
Last updated: 15 September 2023

=== Result records ===
A ODI match is won when one side has scored more runs than the total runs scored by the opposing side during their innings. If both sides have completed their allocated innings and the side that fielded last has the higher number of runs, it is known as a win by runs. This indicates the number of runs that they had scored more than the opposing side. If the side batting last wins the match, it is known as a win by wickets, indicating the number of wickets that were still to fall.

==== Greatest win margins (by runs) ====
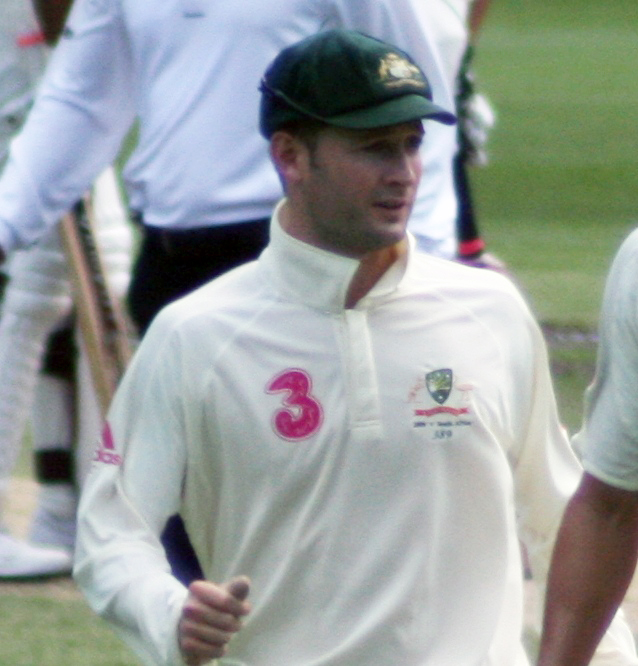
Michael Clarke led Australia to victory over Afghanistan during the 2015 Cricket World Cup by 275 runs.

The greatest winning margin by runs in ODIs was England's victory over South Africa by 342 runs in the third and final ODI of South Africa's 2025 tour of England. Australia's largest victory was over the Netherlands during the 2023 World Cup by 309 runs.

| Rank | Margin | Opposition | Venue | Date |
|---|---|---|---|---|
| 1 | 309 runs | Netherlands | Arun Jaitley Cricket Stadium, Delhi, India | 25 October 2023 ‡ |
| 2 | 276 runs | South Africa | Great Barrier Reef Arena, Mackay, Australia | 24 August 2025 |
| 3 | 275 runs | Afghanistan | WACA Ground, Perth, Australia | 4 March 2015 |
| 4 | 256 runs | Namibia | Senwes Park, Potchefstroom, South Africa | 27 February 2003 |
| 5 | 232 runs | Sri Lanka | Adelaide Oval, Adelaide, Australia | 28 January 1985 |
Last updated: 25 October 2023

==== Greatest win margins (by 10 wickets) ====
Australia have won an ODI match by a margin of 10 wickets on 5 occasions, the most recent being against India in January 2020. (Note: The other teams to have won a ODI match by a margin of 10 wickets are the West Indies (10), New Zealand (9), India (8), South Africa (7), England (6), Sri Lanka (6), Pakistan (4), Afghanistan (1) and Kenya (1).)

| Rank | Margin | Opposition | Venue | Date |
|---|---|---|---|---|
| 1 | 10 wickets | West Indies | Adelaide Oval, Adelaide, Australia | 26 January 2001 |
| 1 | 10 wickets | England | Sydney Cricket Ground, Sydney, Australia | 23 January 2003 |
| 1 | 10 wickets | Bangladesh | Old Trafford Cricket Ground, Manchester, England | 25 June 2005 |
| 1 | 10 wickets | Bangladesh | Sir Vivian Richards Stadium, North Sound, Antigua and Barbuda | 31 March 2007 |
| 1 | 10 wickets | India | Wankhede Stadium, Mumbai, India | 14 January 2020 |
| 1 | 10 wickets | India | Dr. Y.S. Rajasekhara Reddy ACA-VDCA Cricket Stadium, Visakhapatnam, India | 19 March 2023 |
Last updated: 19 March 2023

==== Greatest win margins (by balls remaining) ====
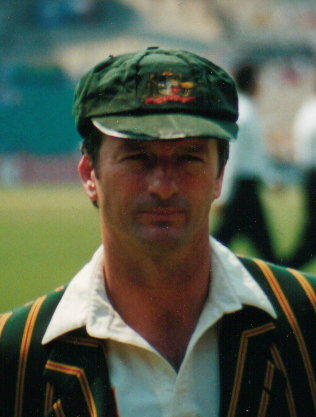
Steve Waugh led Australia to its first ODI victory by a margin of ten wickets, defeating the West Indies in the pool rounds of the 2000–01 Australia Tri-Nation Series.

The group stage of the 1979 World Cup saw England run down the target of 46 runs to defeat Canada by a margin of 8 wickets with 277 balls remaining in the 60-over innings, the largest victory by balls remaining in ODI cricket history. The next largest victory was Sri Lanka's win against Zimbabwe in the opening match of the 2001 LG Abans Triangular Series at the Singhalese Sports Club Cricket Ground in Colombo, where the hosts reached the target of 39 runs with 274 balls to spare. Australia's only ODI match to date against the United States, as of December 2022, at the 2004 Champions Trophy, saw the 66-run target achieved by Australia with 253 balls remaining in their innings – the sixth highest overall.

| Rank | Balls remaining | Margin | Target | Opposition | Venue | Date |
|---|---|---|---|---|---|---|
| 1 | 259 | 8 wickets | 87 | West Indies | Manuka Oval, Canberra, Australia | 6 February 2024 |
| 2 | 253 | 9 wickets | 66 | United States | Rose Bowl, Southampton, England | 13 September 2004 |
| 3 | 244 | 9 wickets | 71 | West Indies | WACA Ground, Perth, Australia | 1 February 2013 |
| 4 | 234 | 10 wickets | 118 | India | Dr. Y.S. Rajasekhara Reddy ACA-VDCA Cricket Stadium, Visakhapatnam, India | 19 March 2023 |
| 5 | 226 | 10 wickets | 118 | England | Sydney Cricket Ground, Sydney, Australia | 23 January 2003 |
| 5 | 226 | 9 wickets | 92 | Ireland | Kensington Oval, Bridgetown, Barbados | 13 April 2007 |
Last updated: 6 February 2024

==== Narrowest win margins (by 1 run) ====
Thirty-three ODI matches have been won by a margin of one run with Australia having won six of them, the most recent being third ODI against Pakistan at the Zayed Sports City Stadium in Abu Dhabi in October 2014.

| Rank | Margin | Opposition | Venue | Date |
|---|---|---|---|---|
| 1 | 1 run | India | M. A. Chidambaram Stadium, Chennai, India | 9 October 1987 |
| 1 | 1 run | India | The Gabba, Brisbane, Australia | 1 March 1992 |
| 1 | 1 run | South Africa | Mangaung Oval, Bloemfontein, South Africa | 8 April 1994 |
| 1 | 1 run | Zimbabwe | WACA Ground, Perth, Australia | 4 February 2001 |
| 1 | 1 run | West Indies | Warner Park, Basseterre, Saint Kitts and Nevis | 4 July 2008 |
| 1 | 1 run | Pakistan | Zayed Sports City Stadium, Abu Dhabi, United Arab Emirates | 12 October 2014 |
Last updated: 31 December 2022

==== Narrowest win margins (by 1 wicket) ====
Australia has won six games by a margin of one wicket.

| Rank | Margin | Opposition | Venue | Date |
|---|---|---|---|---|
| 1 | 1 wicket | New Zealand | Lancaster Park, Christchurch, New Zealand | 21 March 1993 (Note: The reserve day of 22 March 1993 was used to complete the match due to rain.) |
| 1 | 1 wicket | West Indies | Sydney Cricket Ground, Sydney, Australia | 1 January 1996 |
| 1 | 1 wicket | South Africa | Kingsmead Cricket Ground, Durban, South Africa | 10 March 2006 |
| 1 | 1 wicket | England | The Gabba, Brisbane, Australia | 17 January 2014 |
| 1 | 1 wicket | Bangladesh | Sher-e-Bangla National Cricket Stadium, Dhaka, Bangladesh | 14 June 2026 |
| 1 | 1 wicket | Zimbabwe | Harare Sports Club Ground, Harare, Zimbabwe | 20 September 2026 |
Last updated: 20 September 2026

==== Narrowest win margins (by balls remaining) ====
Thirty-seven ODI matches have been won on the final ball of the match with Australia having done so on four occasions. The most recent as of December 2022, was against Pakistan during the group stage of the 2009 ICC Champions Trophy. Set 206 runs for victory, the winning run was a bye off the bowling of Umar Gul with Nathan Hauritz and Brett Lee at the crease.

| Rank | Balls remaining | Margin | Target | Opposition | Venue | Date |
|---|---|---|---|---|---|---|
| 1 | 0 | 2 wickets | 140 | West Indies | Mindoo Phillip Park, Castries, Saint Lucia | 12 April 1978 |
| 1 | 0 | 2 wickets | 178 | England | Sharjah Cricket Stadium, Sharjah, United Arab Emirates | 24 March 1985 |
| 1 | 0 | 1 wicket | 173 | West Indies | Sydney Cricket Ground, Sydney, Australia | 1 January 1996 |
| 1 | 0 | 2 wickets | 206 | Pakistan | Centurion Park, Centurion, South Africa | 30 September 2009 |
Last updated: 31 December 2022

==== Greatest loss margins (by runs) ====
The third and final ODI of Sri Lanka's tour of India saw tourists being defeated by 317 runs, the greatest losing margin by runs in ODI cricket. Australia's largest defeat by number of runs came during the third ODI against England at Trent Bridge in 2018, losing by margin of 242 runs.

| Rank | Margin | Opposition | Venue | Date |
|---|---|---|---|---|
| 1 | 242 runs | England | Trent Bridge, Nottingham, England | 19 June 2018 |
| 2 | 206 runs | New Zealand | Adelaide Oval, Adelaide, Australia | 27 January 1986 |
| 3 | 196 runs | South Africa | Newlands Cricket Ground, Cape Town, South Africa | 3 March 2006 |
| 4 | 186 runs | England | Lord's, London, England | 27 September 2024 |
| 5 | 174 runs | Sri Lanka | R. Premadasa Stadium, Colombo, Sri Lanka | 14 February 2025 |
Last updated: 15 February 2025

==== Greatest loss margins (by wickets) ====
Australia have lost an ODI match by a margin of 10 wickets on only one occasion – against New Zealand in February 2007. Playing at the Wellington Regional Stadium, Australia was bowled all out for 148 runs in 49.3 overs. In reply, New Zealand reached the target in 27 overs for the loss of no wickets. (Note: The other teams to have lost a ODI match by a margin of 10 wickets are Bangladesh (12), Zimbabwe (9), England (6), Sri Lanka (6), India (5), the West Indies (4), Kenya (3), New Zealand (3), Pakistan (3), South Africa (2), Bermuda (1), East Africa (1) and the Netherlands (1).)

| Rank | Margin | Opposition | Venue | Date |
|---|---|---|---|---|
| 1 | 10 wickets | New Zealand | Wellington Regional Stadium, Wellington, New Zealand | 16 February 2007 |
| 2 | 9 wickets | West Indies | Sydney Cricket Ground, Sydney, Australia | 8 February 1984 |
| 2 | 9 wickets | West Indies | Sabina Park, Kingston, Jamaica | 26 April 1984 |
| 2 | 9 wickets | South Africa | Sydney Cricket Ground, Sydney, Australia | 26 February 1992 |
| 2 | 9 wickets | West Indies | WACA Ground, Perth, Australia | 6 December 1992 |
| 2 | 9 wickets | Pakistan | Rawalpindi Cricket Stadium, Rawalpindi, Pakistan | 22 October 1994 |
| 2 | 9 wickets | West Indies | National Cricket Stadium, St. George's, Grenada | 1 June 2003 |
| 2 | 9 wickets | England | Headingley, Leeds, England | 7 July 2005 |
| 2 | 9 wickets | India | Sawai Mansingh Stadium, Jaipur, India | 16 October 2013 |
| 2 | 9 wickets | Pakistan | Gaddafi Stadium, Lahore, Pakistan | 2 April 2022 |
| 2 | 9 wickets | Pakistan | Adelaide Oval, Adelaide, Australia | 8 November 2024 |
Last updated: 31 December 2022

==== Greatest loss margins (by balls remaining) ====
Canada suffered the greatest defeat in ODI cricket during the 1979 World Cup when England run down the target of 46 runs with 277 balls remaining. The Gabba played host to Australia's worst defeat in January 2013 when Sri Lanka scored the 75 runs required for victory with 180 balls remaining.

| Rank | Balls remaining | Margin | Target | Opposition | Venue | Date |
|---|---|---|---|---|---|---|
| 1 | 180 | 4 wickets | 75 | Sri Lanka | The Gabba, Brisbane, Australia | 18 January 2013 |
| 2 | 161 | 1 wicket | 152 | New Zealand | Eden Park, Auckland, New Zealand | 28 February 2015 |
| 3 | 142 | 7 wickets | 132 | South Africa | Centurion Park, Centurion, South Africa | 5 April 2009 |
| 4 | 138 | 10 wickets | 149 | New Zealand | Wellington Regional Stadium, Wellington, New Zealand | 16 February 2007 |
| 5 | 134 | 3 wickets | 155 | South Africa | WACA Ground, Perth, Australia | 16 November 2014 |
Last updated: 31 December 2022

==== Narrowest loss margins (by runs) ====
Thirty-three ODI matches have been lost by a margin of one run with Australia having lost five of them, the most recent being in February 2004 at the Rangiri Dambulla International Stadium against Sri Lanka.

| Rank | Margin | Target | Opposition | Venue | Date |
|---|---|---|---|---|---|
| 1 | 1 run | 221 runs | New Zealand | Sydney Cricket Ground, Sydney, Australia | 13 January 1981 |
| 1 | 1 run | 233 runs | New Zealand | WACA Ground, Perth, Australia | 3 January 1988 |
| 1 | 1 run | 221 runs | West Indies | Sydney Cricket Ground, Sydney, Australia | 13 December 1988 |
| 1 | 1 run | 195 runs | New Zealand | Bellerive Oval, Hobart, Australia | 18 December 1990 |
| 1 | 1 run | 246 runs | Sri Lanka | Rangiri Dambulla International Stadium, Dambulla, Sri Lanka | 22 February 2004 |
Last updated: 31 December 2022

==== Narrowest loss margins (by wickets) ====
ODI cricket has seen sixty-six matches been decided by a margin of one wicket, with Australia being defeated in seven of them. The most recent was final ODI of the five-match series against England at Old Trafford in June 2018. England run down the modest total of 206 runs with nine balls remaining to secure a 5–0 series victory – the first time that Australia had been whitewashed in a five-match ODI series against England.

| Rank | Margin | Opposition | Venue | Date |
|---|---|---|---|---|
| 1 | 1 wicket | Pakistan | WACA Ground, Perth, Australia | 2 January 1987 |
| 1 | 1 wicket | South Africa | Wanderers Stadium, Johannesburg, South Africa | 12 March 2006 |
| 1 | 1 wicket | New Zealand | Seddon Park, Hamilton, New Zealand | 20 February 2007 |
| 1 | 1 wicket | England | Old Trafford Cricket Ground, Manchester, England | 27 June 2010 |
| 1 | 1 wicket | Sri Lanka | Melbourne Cricket Ground, Melbourne, Australia | 3 November 2010 |
| 1 | 1 wicket | New Zealand | Eden Park, Auckland, New Zealand | 28 February 2015 |
| 1 | 1 wicket | England | Old Trafford Cricket Ground, Manchester, England | 24 June 2018 |
Last updated: 31 December 2022

==== Narrowest loss margins (by balls remaining) ====
Thirty-seven ODI matches have been lost on the final ball of the match. The first ODI of the 2008–09 Chappell–Hadlee Trophy series at the WACA has been the only occasion where Australia has lost an ODI match with zero balls remaining. Posting 181, New Zealand ran down the total and won by the match with two wickets in hand.

| Rank | Balls remaining | Margin | Target | Opposition | Venue | Date |
|---|---|---|---|---|---|---|
| 1 | 0 | 2 wickets | 182 | New Zealand | WACA Ground, Perth, Australia | 1 February 2009 |
| 2 | 1 | 1 wicket | 274 | Pakistan | WACA Ground, Perth, Australia | 2 January 1987 |
| 2 | 1 | 3 wickets | 234 | England | Sydney Cricket Ground, Sydney, Australia | 22 January 1987 |
| 2 | 1 | 1 wicket | 435 | South Africa | Wanderers Stadium, Johannesburg, South Africa | 12 March 2006 |
| 5 | 2 | 3 wickets | 248 | New Zealand | Seddon Park, Hamilton, New Zealand | 27 March 1993 |
| 5 | 2 | 3 wickets | 243 | Sri Lanka | Melbourne Cricket Ground, Melbourne, Australia | 16 January 1996 |
| 5 | 2 | 4 wickets | 247 | New Zealand | Docklands Stadium, Melbourne, Australia | 5 December 2004 |
| 5 | 2 | 4 wickets | 270 | India | Adelaide Oval, Adelaide, Australia | 12 February 2012 |
| 5 | 2 | 6 wickets | 331 | India | Sydney Cricket Ground, Sydney, Australia | 23 January 2016 |
Last updated: 31 December 2022

==== Tied matches ====
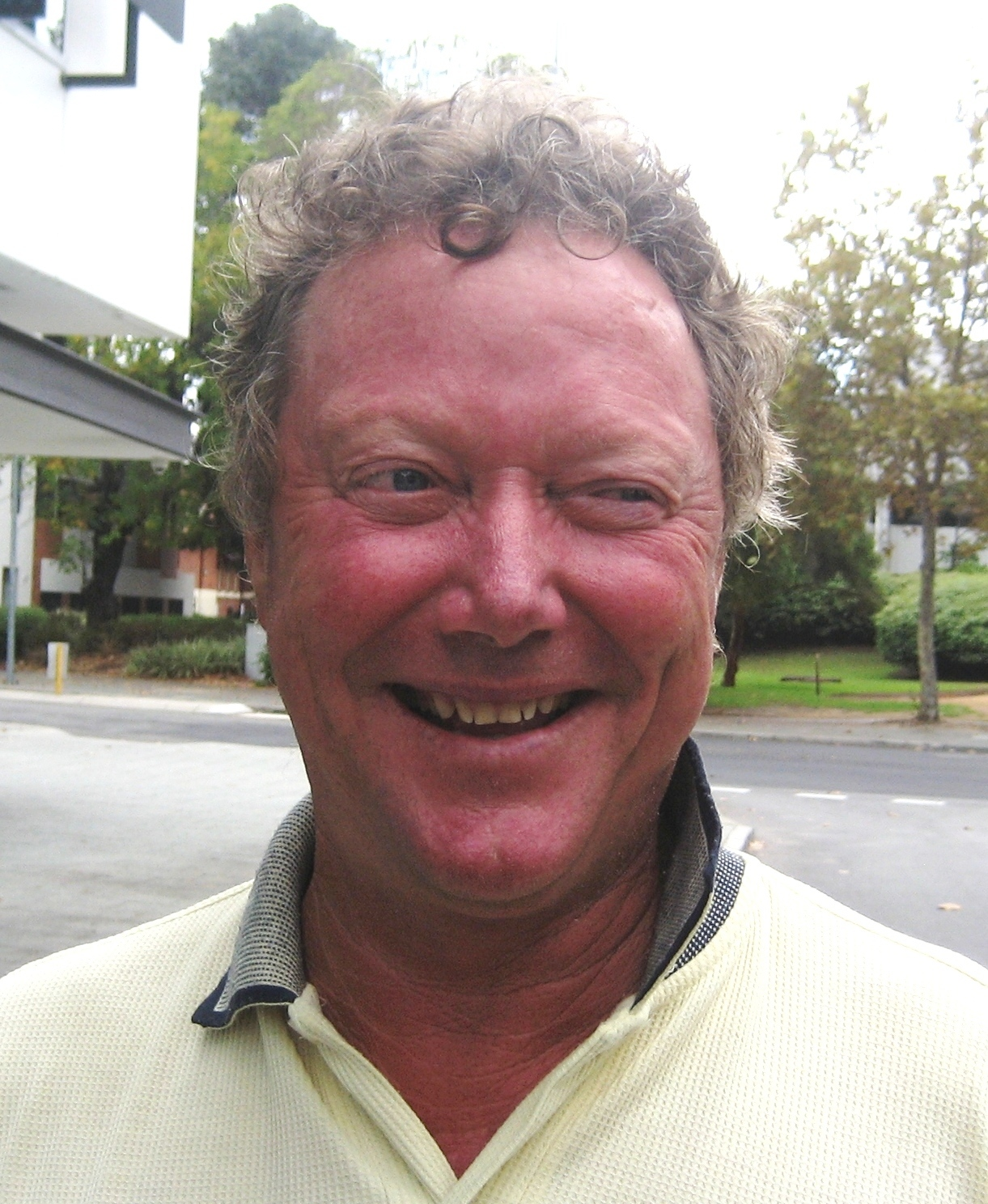
The first tied ODI match was played between Australia and the West Indies during the second final of the 1983–84 Australian Tri-Series at the Melbourne Cricket Ground. The hosts were captained by Kim Hughes (pictured).

A tie can occur when the scores of both teams are equal at the conclusion of play, provided that the side batting last has completed their innings. As of December 2022, there have made 42 matches have ended in a tie in ODI cricket history, with nine involving Australia. The most recent match was against the West Indies at the Arnos Vale Stadium in March 2012. The West Indies required one run for victory from the final three deliveries of the bowling of Brett Lee, but when the captain Daren Sammy was run out this left both teams unable to be split with 220 runs each.

There was one match involving Australia when a tie-breaker was used after the scores were level. In the only ODI match played against Pakistan during the 1988–89 tour, both teams finished with 229 runs in the 45-over match. Pakistan was declared winner though due to loss of one fewer wicket.

| Opposition | Venue | Date |
|---|---|---|
| West Indies ♠ | Melbourne Cricket Ground, Melbourne, Australia | 11 February 1984 |
| England ♠ | Trent Bridge, Nottingham, England | 27 May 1989 |
| Pakistan ♠ | Bellerive Oval, Hobart, Australia | 10 December 1992 |
| West Indies ♠ | Bourda, Georgetown, Guyana | 21 April 1999 |
| South Africa ♠ | Edgbaston Cricket Ground, Birmingham, England | 17 June 1999 |
| South Africa ♠ | Docklands Stadium, Melbourne, Australia | 18 August 2000 |
| South Africa ♠ | Senwes Park, Potchefstroom, South Africa | 27 March 2002 |
| England ♠ | Lord's, London, England | 2 July 2005 |
| West Indies ♠ | Arnos Vale Stadium, Arnos Vale, Saint Vincent and the Grenadines | 20 March 2012 |
Last updated: 31 December 2022

== Batting records ==
=== Most career runs ===
A run is the basic means of scoring in cricket. A run is scored when the batsman hits the ball with his bat and with his partner runs the length of 22 yards (20 m) of the pitch.

India's Sachin Tendulkar has scored the most runs in ODI cricket with 18,426. Second is Kumar Sangakkara of Sri Lanka with 14,234 ahead of Virat Kohli in third with 13,848. Ricky Ponting from Australia is in fourth with 13,704. (Note: This total includes the 115 runs he scored for the ICC World XI in the World Cricket Tsunami Appeal match against the ACC Asia XI in 2005.) No other Australian batsmen has scored more than 10,000 runs in ODI cricket.

| Rank | Runs | Player | Matches | Innings | Average | 100 | 50 | Period |
|---|---|---|---|---|---|---|---|---|
| 1 | 13,589 | Ricky Ponting | 374 | 364 | 41.81 | 30 | 82 | 1995–2012 |
| 2 | 9,595 | Adam Gilchrist | 286 | 278 | 35.93 | 16 | 55 | 1996–2008 |
| 3 | 8,500 | Mark Waugh | 244 | 236 | 39.35 | 18 | 50 | 1988–2002 |
| 4 | 7,981 | Michael Clarke | 245 | 223 | 44.58 | 8 | 58 | 2003–2015 |
| 5 | 7,569 | Steve Waugh | 325 | 288 | 32.90 | 3 | 45 | 1986–2002 |
| 6 | 6,932 | David Warner | 161 | 159 | 45.30 | 22 | 33 | 2009–2023 |
| 7 | 6,912 | Michael Bevan | 232 | 196 | 53.58 | 6 | 46 | 1994–2004 |
| 8 | 6,524 | Allan Border | 273 | 252 | 30.62 | 3 | 39 | 1979–1994 |
| 9 | 6,131 | Matthew Hayden | 160 | 154 | 44.10 | 10 | 36 | 1993–2008 |
| 10 | 6,068 | Dean Jones | 164 | 161 | 44.61 | 7 | 46 | 1984–1994 |
Last updated: 26 November 2023

=== Fastest runs getter ===
| Runs | Batsman | Match | Innings | Record date | Reference |
|---|---|---|---|---|---|
| 1000 | George Bailey | 28 | 26 | 14 September 2013 | |
| 2000 | David Boon | 54 | 52 | 17 January 1988 | |
| 3000 | Travis Head | 79 | 76 | 25 October 2025 | |
| 4000 | David Warner | 95 | 93 | 5 June 2017 | |
| 5000 | David Warner | 117 | 115 | 14 January 2020 | |
| 6000 | David Warner | 141 | 139 | 22 November 2022 | |
| 7000 | Ricky Ponting | 196 | 192 | 22 February 2004 | |
| 8000 | Ricky Ponting | 225 | 220 | 23 June 2005 | |
| 9000 | Ricky Ponting | 248 | 242 | 5 March 2006 | |
| 10000 | Ricky Ponting | 272 | 266 | 24 March 2007 | |
| 11000 | Ricky Ponting | 295 | 286 | 24 February 2008 | |
| 12000 | Ricky Ponting | 323 | 314 | 2 October 2009 | |
| 13000 | Ricky Ponting | 350 | 341 | 30 June 2010 | |

=== Most runs in each batting position ===
| Batting position | Batsman | Innings | Runs | Average | ODI Career Span | Ref |
|---|---|---|---|---|---|---|
| Opener | Adam Gilchrist | 258 | 9,176 | 36.55 | 1998–2008 | |
| Number 3 | Ricky Ponting | 329 | 12,547 | 42.24 | 1995–2012 | |
| Number 4 | Michael Clarke | 111 | 4,223 | 46.40 | 2004–2015 | |
| Number 5 | Steve Waugh | 135 | 4,117 | 37.42 | 1986–2002 | |
| Number 6 | Michael Bevan | 87 | 3,006 | 56.71 | 1994–2004 | |
| Number 7 | Ian Healy | 78 | 1,238 | 21.71 | 1988–1997 | |
| Number 8 | James Faulkner | 35 | 664 | 31.61 | 2013–2017 | |
| Number 9 | Brett Lee | 59 | 630 | 16.57 | 2000–2012 | |
| Number 10 | Adam Zampa† | 33 | 227 | 10.80 | 2016-2025 | |
| Number 11 | Glenn McGrath | 66 | 114 | 4.07 | 1993–2007 | |
Last updated: 26 November 2023.

=== Most runs against each team ===
| Opposition | Runs | Batsman | Matches | Innings | Career Span | Ref |
|---|---|---|---|---|---|---|
| Afghanistan | 309 | David Warner | 4 | 4 | 2012–2023 | |
| Bangladesh | 444 | Adam Gilchrist | 12 | 10 | 1999–2007 | |
| Canada | 94 | Shane Watson | 1 | 1 | 2011–2011 | |
| England | 1,598 | Ricky Ponting | 39 | 38 | 1999–2010 | |
| India | 2,164 | Ricky Ponting | 59 | 59 | 1995–2012 | |
| Ireland | 132 | David Warner | 3 | 2 | 2012–2016 | |
| Kenya | 130 | Mark Waugh | 1 | 1 | 1996–1996 | |
| Kenya | 130 | Adam Gilchrist | 3 | 3 | 2002–2003 | |
| Namibia | 88 | Matthew Hayden | 1 | 1 | 2003–2003 | |
| Netherlands | 123 | Brad Hodge | 1 | 1 | 2007–2007 | |
| New Zealand | 1,971 | Ricky Ponting | 51 | 50 | 1995–2011 | |
| Pakistan | 1,107 | Ricky Ponting | 35 | 35 | 1996–2011 | |
| Scotland | 168 | Aaron Finch | 2 | 2 | 2013–2015 | |
| South Africa | 1,879 | Ricky Ponting | 48 | 48 | 1995–2011 | |
| Sri Lanka | 1,649 | Ricky Ponting | 46 | 45 | 1995–2012 | |
| United States | 24 | Adam Gilchrist | 1 | 1 | 2004–2004 | |
| West Indies | 1,708 | Mark Waugh | 47 | 45 | 1988–2001 | |
| Zimbabwe | 949 | Ricky Ponting | 21 | 20 | 1996–2011 | |
Last updated: 23 November 2023

=== Highest individual score ===
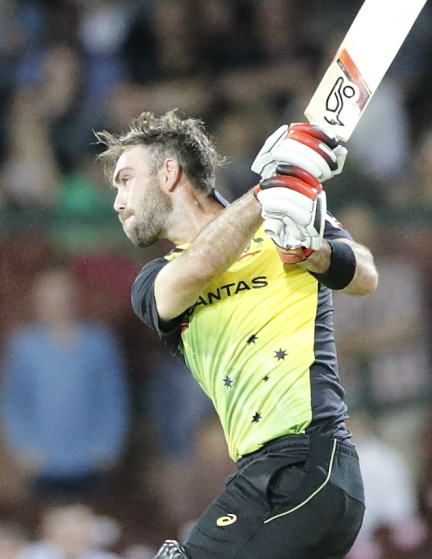
Glenn Maxwell has scored the highest individual ODI score (201 not out) for Australia.

The fourth ODI of the 2014–15 series contested between India and Sri Lanka, at the Eden Gardens in Kolkata saw Rohit Sharma of India set the highest individual ODI innings score with 264. Four months later during the quarter-finals of the 2015 Cricket World Cup, New Zealand's Martin Guptill posted the second highest individual ODI innings score of 237 not out against the West Indies at Wellington Regional Stadium. Glenn Maxwell holds the Australian record with his score of 201 not out coming against Afghanistan during the 2023 World Cup, surpassing Shane Watson's 185 not out against Bangladesh in 2011. David Warner has made two of Australia's five highest ODI individual scores, with his best of 179 coming against Pakistan at Adelaide Oval on Australia Day 2017.

| Rank | Runs | Player | Opposition | Venue | Date |
|---|---|---|---|---|---|
| 1 | 201* | Glenn Maxwell | Afghanistan | Wankhede Stadium, Mumbai, India | 7 November 2023 |
| 2 | 185* | Shane Watson | Bangladesh | Sher-e-Bangla National Cricket Stadium, Dhaka, Bangladesh | 11 April 2011 |
| 3 | 181* | Matthew Hayden | New Zealand | Seddon Park, Hamilton, New Zealand | 20 February 2007 |
| 4 | 179 | David Warner | Pakistan | Adelaide Oval, Adelaide, Australia | 26 January 2017 |
| 5 | 178 | David Warner | Afghanistan | WACA Ground, Perth, Australia | 4 March 2015 |
Last updated: 7 November 2023

=== Highest career average ===
A batsman's batting average is the total number of runs they have scored divided by the number of times they have been dismissed.

The Netherlands' Ryan ten Doeschate holds the record for the highest ODI average at 67.00. The next two are Indian players Shubman Gill and former captain Virat Kohli, with averages of 61.37 and 58.67 respectively. Australian Michael Bevan has the seventh-best career average in ODI cricket with 53.58.

| Rank | Average | Player | Runs | Innings | Not out | Period |
|---|---|---|---|---|---|---|
| 1 | 53.58 | Michael Bevan | 6,912 | 196 | 67 | 1994–2004 |
| 2 | 48.15 | Michael Hussey | 5,442 | 157 | 44 | 2004–2012 |
| 3 | 45.78 | Adam Voges | 870 | 28 | 9 | 2007–2013 |
| 4 | 45.30 | David Warner | 6,932 | 159 | 6 | 2009–2023 |
| 5 | 44.61 | Dean Jones | 6,068 | 161 | 25 | 1984–1994 |
Qualification: 20 innings Last updated: 26 November 2023

=== Highest average in each batting position ===
| Batting position | Batsman | Innings | Runs | Average | Career Span | Ref |
|---|---|---|---|---|---|---|
| Opener | Usman Khawaja† | 20 | 1,019 | 53.63 | 2013–2019 | |
| Number 3 | Steve Smith | 95 | 4,369 | 52.01 | 2014–2025 | |
| Number 4 | Michael Bevan | 53 | 2,265 | 59.60 | 1994–2004 | |
| Number 5 | Andrew Symonds | 96 | 3,473 | 44.52 | 2000–2009 | |
| Number 6 | Michael Bevan | 87 | 3,006 | 56.71 | 1994–2004 | |
| Number 7 | Michael Hussey | 21 | 725 | 120.83 | 2004–2012 | |
| Number 8 | James Faulkner | 35 | 664 | 31.61 | 2013–2017 | |
| Number 9 | Brett Lee | 59 | 630 | 16.57 | 2000–2012 | |
| Number 10 | Adam Zampa† | 27 | 170 | 10.00 | 2016-2023 | |
| Number 11 | Josh Hazlewood† | 28 | 93 | 18.60 | 2013–2023 | |
Last updated: 6 March 2025. Qualification: Min 20 innings batted at position

=== Highest career strike rate ===
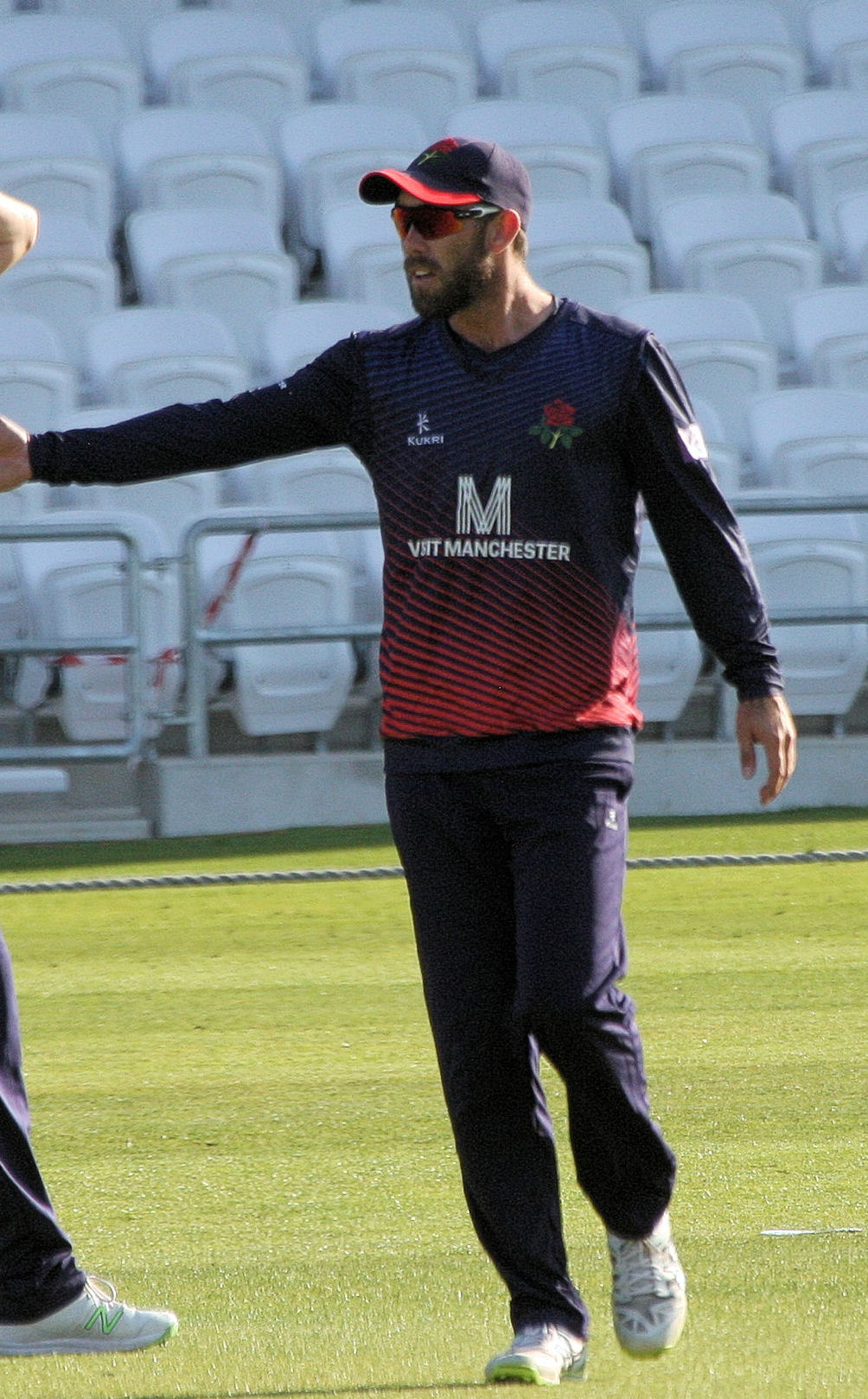
Glenn Maxwell, as of December 2022, has the highest ODI career strike rate for Australia with 126.91.

A batsman's strike rate is the average number of runs scored per 100 balls faced.

As of March 2025, Andre Russell of the West Indies tops the list of highest strike rates with 130.22. Australia's Glenn Maxwell follows with 126.70 and Heinrich Klaasen of South Africa with rate of 117.34 is third. James Faulkner, Josh Inglis and Travis Head are the only other Australians with an ODI batting strike rate of above 100. Although, Luke Ronchi achieved a strike rate of 205.40 in his two innings for Australia, before playing 81 matches for New Zealand, finishing his career with a strike rate of 114.50

| Rank | Strike rate | Player | Runs | Balls faced | Period |
|---|---|---|---|---|---|
| 1 | 126.70 | Glenn Maxwell† | 3,990 | 3,149 | 2012–2025 |
| 2 | 104.89 | Travis Head† | 2,767 | 2,638 | 2016–2025 |
| 3 | 104.24 | James Faulkner | 1,032 | 990 | 2013–2017 |
| 4 | 97.38 | Peter Handscomb | 632 | 649 | 2017–2019 |
| 5 | 97.26 | Josh Inglis† | 674 | 637 | 2022–2025 |
Qualification: 500 balls faced Last updated: 4 March 2025

=== Most sixes ===
| Rank | Sixes | Player | Innings | Runs | Period |
|---|---|---|---|---|---|
| 1 | 159 | Ricky Ponting | 364 | 13,589 | 1995–2012 |
| 2 | 155 | Glenn Maxwell† | 136 | 3,990 | 2012–2025 |
| 3 | 148 | Adam Gilchrist | 278 | 9,595 | 1996–2008 |
| 4 | 131 | Shane Watson | 169 | 5,757 | 2002–2015 |
| 5 | 130 | David Warner | 159 | 6,932 | 2009–2023 |
Last updated: 4 March 2025

=== Most fours ===
| Rank | Fours | Player | Innings | Runs | Period |
|---|---|---|---|---|---|
| 1 | 1,223 | Ricky Ponting | 364 | 13,589 | 1995–2012 |
| 2 | 1,159 | Adam Gilchrist | 278 | 9,595 | 1996–2008 |
| 3 | 733 | David Warner | 159 | 6,932 | 2009–2023 |
| 4 | 665 | Michael Clarke | 223 | 7,981 | 2003–2015 |
| 5 | 651 | Mark Waugh | 236 | 8500 | 1988–2005 |
Last updated: 26 November 2023

=== Most half-centuries ===
A half-century is a score of between 50 and 99 runs. Statistically, once a batsman's score reaches 100, it is no longer considered a half-century but a century.

Sachin Tendulkar of India has scored the most half-centuries in ODI cricket with 96. He is followed by Sri Lanka's Kumar Sangakkara on 93, South Africa's Jacques Kallis on 86, India's Rahul Dravid and Inzamam-ul-Haq of Pakistan 83 and in sixth with 82 fifties to his name, Australia's Ricky Ponting.

| Rank | Half centuries | Player | Innings | Runs | Period |
|---|---|---|---|---|---|
| 1 | 82 | Ricky Ponting | 364 | 13,589 | 1995–2012 |
| 2 | 58 | Michael Clarke | 223 | 7,981 | 2003–2015 |
| 3 | 55 | Adam Gilchrist | 278 | 9,595 | 1996–2008 |
| 4 | 50 | Mark Waugh | 236 | 8,500 | 1988–2002 |
| 5 | 46 | Dean Jones | 161 | 6,068 | 1984–1994 |
| 5 | 46 | Michael Bevan | 196 | 6,912 | 1994–2004 |
Last updated: 31 December 2022

=== Most centuries ===
A century is a score of 100 or more runs in a single innings.

On 15 November 2023, Virat Kohli became the first player to score 50 ODI centuries, breaking Sachin Tendulkar's long-held record of 49. Tendulkar and fellow Indian Rohit Sharma have scored the second and third most centuries, with 49 and 31 respectively, whilst Australia's Ricky Ponting is fourth with 30. (Note: This total includes the century he scored for the ICC World XI in the World Cricket Tsunami Appeal match against the ACC Asia XI in 2005.)

| Rank | Centuries | Player | Innings | Runs | Period |
|---|---|---|---|---|---|
| 1 | 30 | Ricky Ponting | 375 | 13,704 | 1995–2012 |
| 2 | 22 | David Warner | 154 | 6,810 | 2009–2023 |
| 3 | 18 | Mark Waugh | 236 | 8,500 | 1988–2002 |
| 4 | 17 | Aaron Finch | 142 | 5,406 | 2013–2022 |
| 5 | 16 | Adam Gilchrist | 278 | 9,595 | 1996–2008 |
Last updated: 28 October 2023

=== Most runs in a bilateral series ===
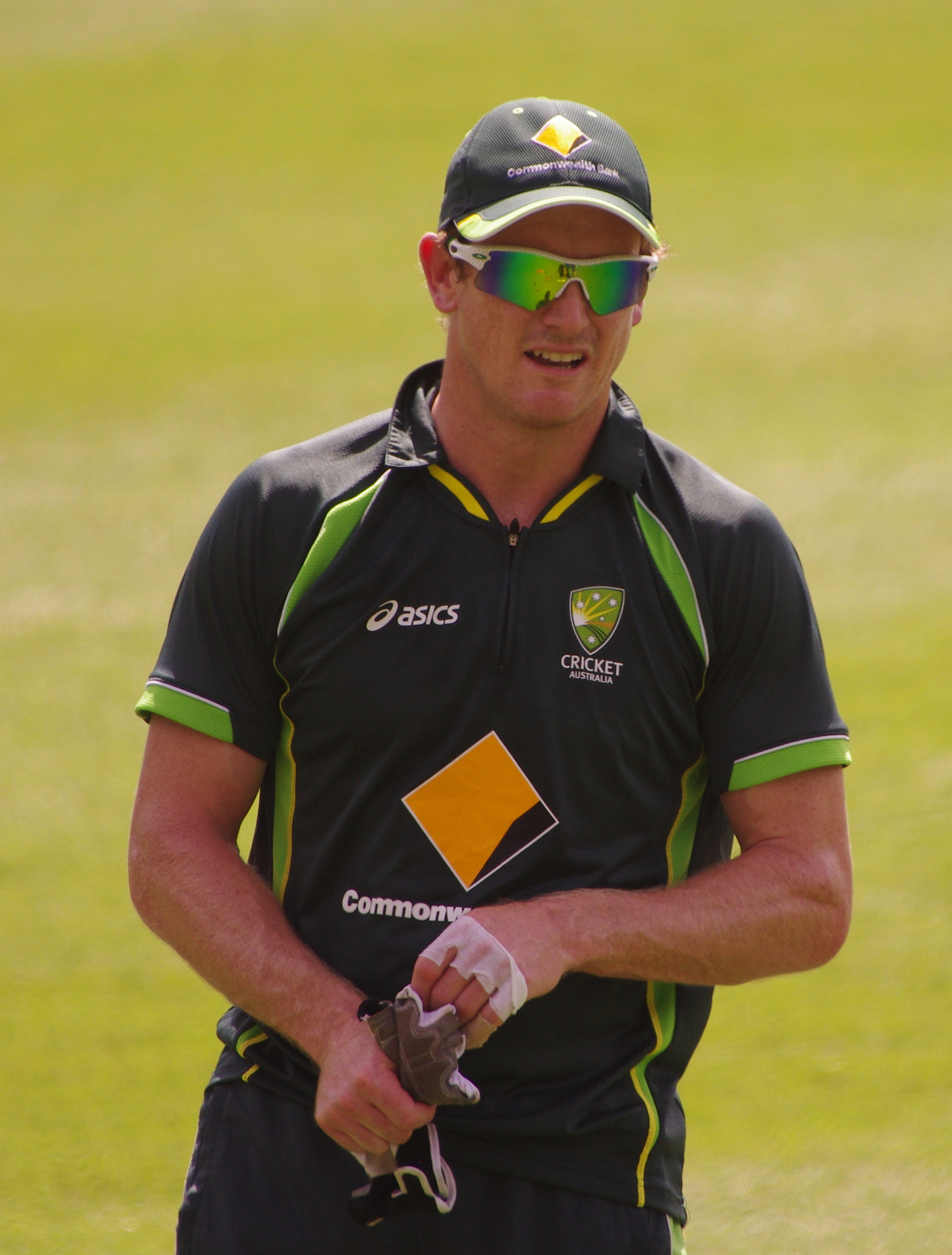
George Bailey scored 478 runs in the ODI tour India in 2013, the most runs scored by an Australian in an ODI bilateral series.

The 6-match series between India and South Africa in February 2018 saw the touring captain Virat Kohli set the record for the most runs scored in a bilateral ODI series, with 558 runs. Five months later, Pakistan's Fakhar Zaman scored 515 runs on tour during the 5-match series against Zimbabwe. Australia's tour of India in October 2013 saw India's Rohit Sharma score a total of 491 runs and Australian captain George Bailey finish with 478 runs to his name from the 6-match series. (Note: Seven matches were scheduled with the fifth ODI abandoned due to rain.)

| Rank | Runs | Player | Matches | Innings | Series |
|---|---|---|---|---|---|
| 1 | 478 | George Bailey | 6 | 6 | Australian cricket team in India in 2013–14 |
| 2 | 451 | Aaron Finch | 5 | 5 | Australian cricket team against Pakistan in the UAE in 2018–19 |
| 3 | 386 | David Warner | 5 | 5 | Australian cricket team in South Africa in 2016–17 |
| 4 | 383 | Usman Khawaja | 5 | 5 | Australian cricket team in India in 2018–19 |
| 5 | 367 | David Warner | 5 | 5 | Pakistani cricket team in Australia in 2016–17 |
Last updated: 31 December 2022

=== Most ducks ===
A duck refers to a batsman being dismissed without scoring a run. Sanath Jayasuriya of Sri Lanka has scored the most number of ducks in ODI cricket with 34 ahead of Pakistan's Shahid Afridi with 30. Former Australian captain Ricky Ponting leads the list of Australians with 20 followed by Adam Gilchrist who failed score a run in an ODI innings on 19 occasions.

| Rank | Ducks | Player | Matches | Innings | Period |
|---|---|---|---|---|---|
| 1 | 20 | Ricky Ponting | 374 | 364 | 1995–2012 |
| 2 | 19 | Adam Gilchrist | 286 | 278 | 1996–2008 |
| 3 | 16 | Brett Lee | 221 | 110 | 2000–2012 |
| 3 | 16 | Aaron Finch | 146 | 142 | 2013–2022 |
| 3 | 16 | Mark Waugh | 244 | 236 | 1988–2002 |
Last updated: 31 December 2022

== Bowling records ==
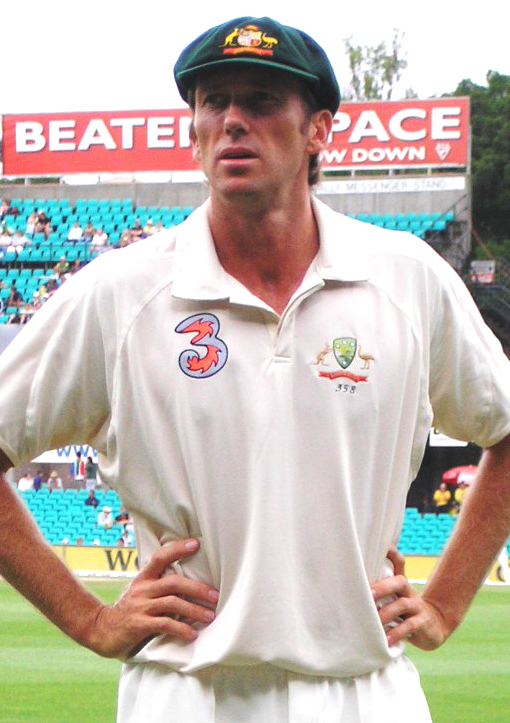
Glenn McGrath has taken the equal most ODI wickets (380) and return the best ODI bowling figures (7/15) for Australia.

=== Most career wickets ===
A bowler takes the wicket of a batsman when the form of dismissal is bowled, caught, leg before wicket, stumped or hit wicket. If the batsman is dismissed by run out, obstructing the field, handling the ball, hitting the ball twice or timed out the bowler does not receive credit.

Pakistan's Wasim Akram held the record for the most ODI wickets with 502 until February 2009 when Sri Lankan bowler Muttiah Muralitharan passed Akram's milestone. Muralitharan, who continued to play until 2011, finished with 534 wickets to his name. Pakistan's Waqar Younis is third on the list taking 416 wickets. Glenn McGrath of Australia is seventh on the list with 381 ODI wickets (Note: This total includes the single wicket he took for the ICC World XI in the World Cricket Tsunami Appeal match against the ACC Asia XI in 2005.) one ahead of his compatriot Brett Lee who finished his career with 380.

| Rank | Wickets | Player | Matches | Innings | Average | SR | 4W | 5W | Period |
|---|---|---|---|---|---|---|---|---|---|
| 1 | 380 | Glenn McGrath | 249 | 247 | 21.98 | 34.0 | 9 | 7 | 1993–2007 |
| 1 | 380 | Brett Lee | 221 | 217 | 23.36 | 29.4 | 14 | 9 | 2000–2012 |
| 3 | 291 | Shane Warne | 193 | 190 | 25.82 | 36.4 | 12 | 1 | 1993–2003 |
| 4 | 244 | Mitchell Starc† | 127 | 127 | 23.40 | 26.68 | 12 | 9 | 2010–2024 |
| 5 | 239 | Mitchell Johnson | 153 | 150 | 25.26 | 31.33 | 9 | 3 | 2005–2015 |
| 6 | 203 | Craig McDermott | 138 | 138 | 24.71 | 36.75 | 4 | 1 | 1985–1996 |
| 7 | 195 | Steve Waugh | 325 | 207 | 34.67 | 45.55 | 3 | 0 | 1986–2002 |
| 8 | 191 | Adam Zampa† | 113 | 113 | 28.60 | 30.87 | 11 | 1 | 2016–2025 |
| 9 | 174 | Nathan Bracken | 116 | 116 | 24.36 | 33.09 | 5 | 2 | 2001–2009 |
| 10 | 168 | Shane Watson | 190 | 163 | 31.79 | 38.48 | 3 | 0 | 2002–2015 |
Last updated: 22 August 2025

=== Most wickets against each team ===
| Opposition | Wickets | Bowler | Matches | Innings | Career Span | Ref |
|---|---|---|---|---|---|---|
| Afghanistan | 8 | Mitchell Starc† | 4 | 4 | 2012–2023 | |
| Bangladesh | 18 | Brad Hogg | 9 | 9 | 2003–2007 | |
| Canada | 5 | Alan Hurst | 1 | 1 | 1979–1979 | |
| England | 65 | Brett Lee | 37 | 37 | 2001–2012 | |
| India | 55 | Brett Lee | 32 | 30 | 2000–2012 | |
| Ireland | 5 | James Hopes | 1 | 1 | 2010–2010 | |
| Kenya | 6 | Brett Lee | 4 | 4 | 2002–2011 | |
| Namibia | 7 | Glenn McGrath | 1 | 1 | 2003–2003 | |
| Netherlands | 4 | Brad Hogg | 1 | 1 | 2007–2007 | |
| New Zealand | 59 | Glenn McGrath | 32 | 31 | 1993–2007 | |
| Pakistan | 57 | Glenn McGrath | 32 | 32 | 1994–2005 | |
| Scotland | 6 | Mitchell Johnson | 3 | 3 | 2009–2015 | |
| South Africa | 60 | Shane Warne | 45 | 44 | 1993–2002 | |
| Sri Lanka | 38 | Brett Lee | 29 | 29 | 2002–2012 | |
| United States | 4 | Michael Kasprowicz | 1 | 1 | 2004–2004 | |
| United States | 4 | Jason Gillespie | 1 | 1 | 2004–2004 | |
| West Indies | 63 | Craig McDermott | 35 | 35 | 1985–1996 | |
| Zimbabwe | 21 | Shane Warne | 12 | 11 | 1994–2001 | |
Last updated: 26 November 2023

=== Best figures in an innings ===
Bowling figures refers to the number of the wickets a bowler has taken and the number of runs conceded.

No bowler in the history of ODI cricket has taken all 10 wickets in an innings. The closest to do so was Sri Lankan fast bowler Chaminda Vaas. In the opening match of the 2001 LG Abans Triangular Series between Sri Lanka and Zimbabwe at the Singhalese Sports Club Cricket Ground in Colombo, Vaas took 8/19. Pakistani Shahid Afridi, who returned figured of 7/12 against the West Indies at Providence Stadium in Guyana in July 2013, sits behind Vaas. Australia's undefeated run during the 2003 Cricket World Cup saw Glenn McGrath take 7/15 against in Namibia and Andy Bichel 7/20 against England for the third and fifth best in ODI history. These performances broke the long-standing Australian record of Gary Gilmour's 6/14 set during the semi-final of 1975 Cricket World Cup against England.

| Rank | Figures | Player | Opposition | Venue | Date |
|---|---|---|---|---|---|
| 1 | 7/15 | Glenn McGrath | Namibia | Senwes Park, Potchefstroom, South Africa | 27 February 2003 |
| 2 | 7/20 | Andy Bichel | England | St George's Park Cricket Ground, Port Elizabeth, South Africa | 2 March 2003 |
| 3 | 6/14 | Gary Gilmour | England | Headingley, Leeds, England | 18 June 1975 |
| 4 | 6/28 | Mitchell Starc | New Zealand | Eden Park, Auckland, New Zealand | 28 February 2015 |
| 5 | 6/31 | Mitchell Johnson | Sri Lanka | Pallekele International Cricket Stadium, Kandy, Sri Lanka | 10 August 2011 |
Last updated: 31 December 2022

=== Best career average ===
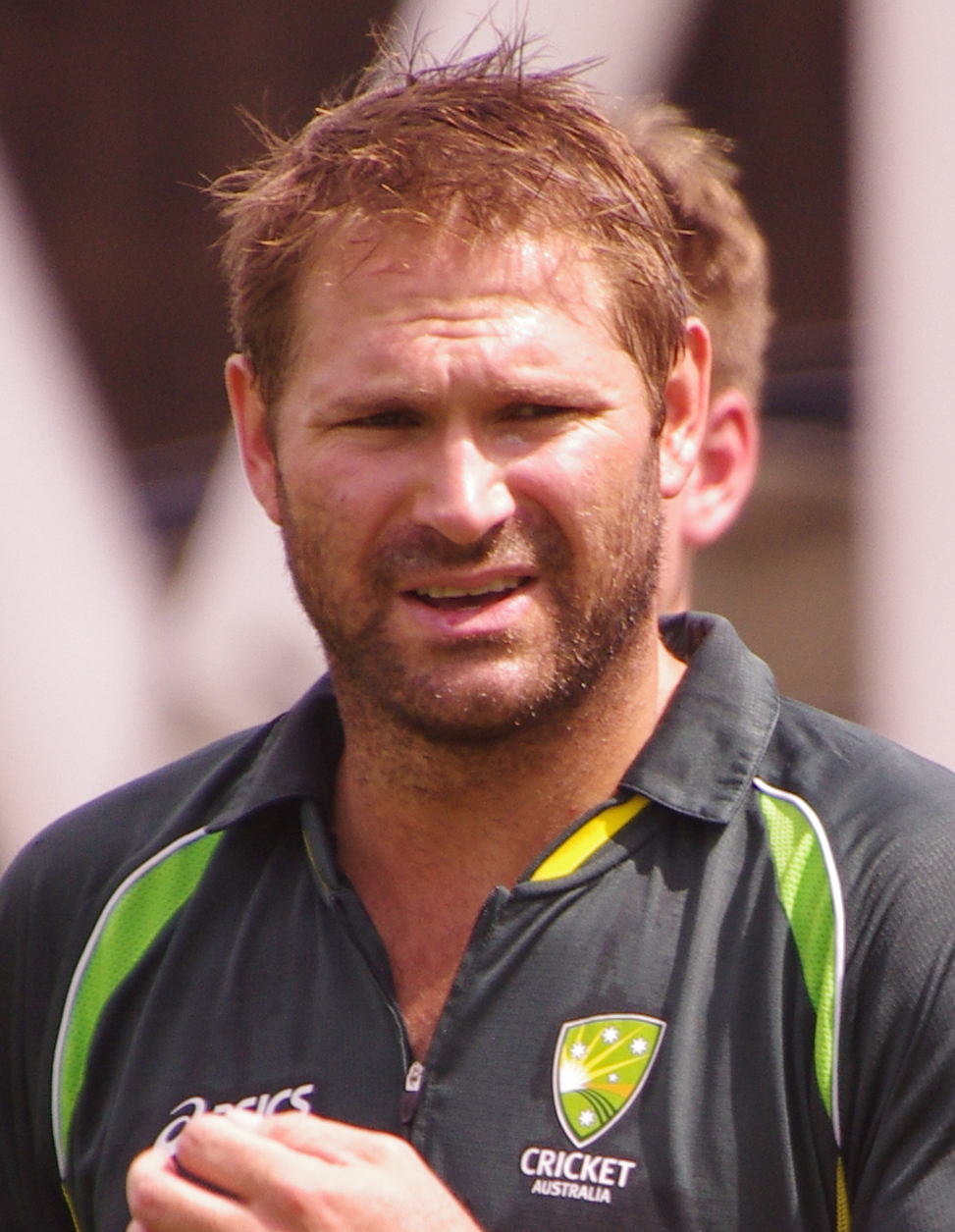
Ryan Harris holds the Australian record for the best ODI career bowling average and strike rate, with figures of 18.90 and 23.4, respectively.

A bowler's bowling average is the total number of runs they have conceded divided by the number of wickets they have taken.

Nepalese leg spinner Sandeep Lamichhane holds the record for the best career average in ODI cricket with 18.06, as of November 2023. He is followed the Emirati off spiner Basil Hameed on 18.77 and by West Indian pacer Joel Garner on 18.84. Australia's Ryan Harris sits fourth with a bowling average of 18.90 runs per wicket.

| Rank | Average | Player | Wickets | Runs | Balls | Period |
|---|---|---|---|---|---|---|
| 1 | 18.90 | Ryan Harris | 44 | 832 | 1,031 | 2009–2012 |
| 2 | 20.11 | Len Pascoe | 53 | 1,066 | 1,568 | 1977–1982 |
| 3 | 20.82 | Dennis Lillee | 103 | 2,145 | 3,593 | 1972–1983 |
| 4 | 20.91 | Tony Dodemaide | 36 | 753 | 1,327 | 1988–1993 |
| 5 | 21.98 | Glenn McGrath | 380 | 8,354 | 12,928 | 1993–2007 |
Qualification: 1,000 balls Last updated: 31 December 2022

=== Best career economy rate ===
A bowler's economy rate is the total number of runs they have conceded divided by the number of overs they have bowled.

West Indian bowler Joel Garner holds the ODI record for the best career economy rate with 3.09. Australia's Max Walker, with a rate of 3.25 runs per over conceded over his 17-match ODI career, is second on the list.

| Rank | Economy rate | Player | Runs | Balls | Wickets | Period |
|---|---|---|---|---|---|---|
| 1 | 3.25 | Max Walker | 546 | 1,006 | 20 | 1974–1981 |
| 2 | 3.37 | Simon Davis | 1,133 | 2,016 | 44 | 1986–1988 |
| 3 | 3.40 | Tony Dodemaide | 753 | 1,327 | 36 | 1988–1993 |
| 4 | 3.55 | Mike Whitney | 1,249 | 2,106 | 46 | 1983–1993 |
| 5 | 3.58 | Dennis Lillee | 2,145 | 3,593 | 103 | 1972–1983 |
Qualification: 1,000 balls Last updated: 31 December 2022

=== Best career strike rate ===
A bowler's strike rate is the total number of balls they have bowled divided by the number of wickets they have taken.

Australia's Ryan Harris, who retired with a rate of 23.4, holds the ODI record for lowest strike rate. Fellow Australian Mitchell Starc, is currently seventh on the list, as of November 2023, with rate of 26.4 deliveries per wicket.

| Rank | Strike rate | Player | Wickets | Balls | Runs | Period |
|---|---|---|---|---|---|---|
| 1 | 23.4 | Ryan Harris | 44 | 1,031 | 832 | 2009–2012 |
| 2 | 26.5 | Mitchell Starc† | 243 | 6,458 | 5,420 | 2010–2023 |
| 3 | 27.2 | Shaun Tait | 62 | 1,688 | 1,461 | 2007–2011 |
| 4 | 29.4 | Brett Lee | 380 | 11,185 | 8,877 | 2000–2012 |
| 5 | 29.5 | Len Pascoe | 53 | 1,568 | 1,066 | 1977–1982 |
Qualification: 1,000 balls Last updated: 26 November 2023

=== Most five-wicket hauls in an innings ===
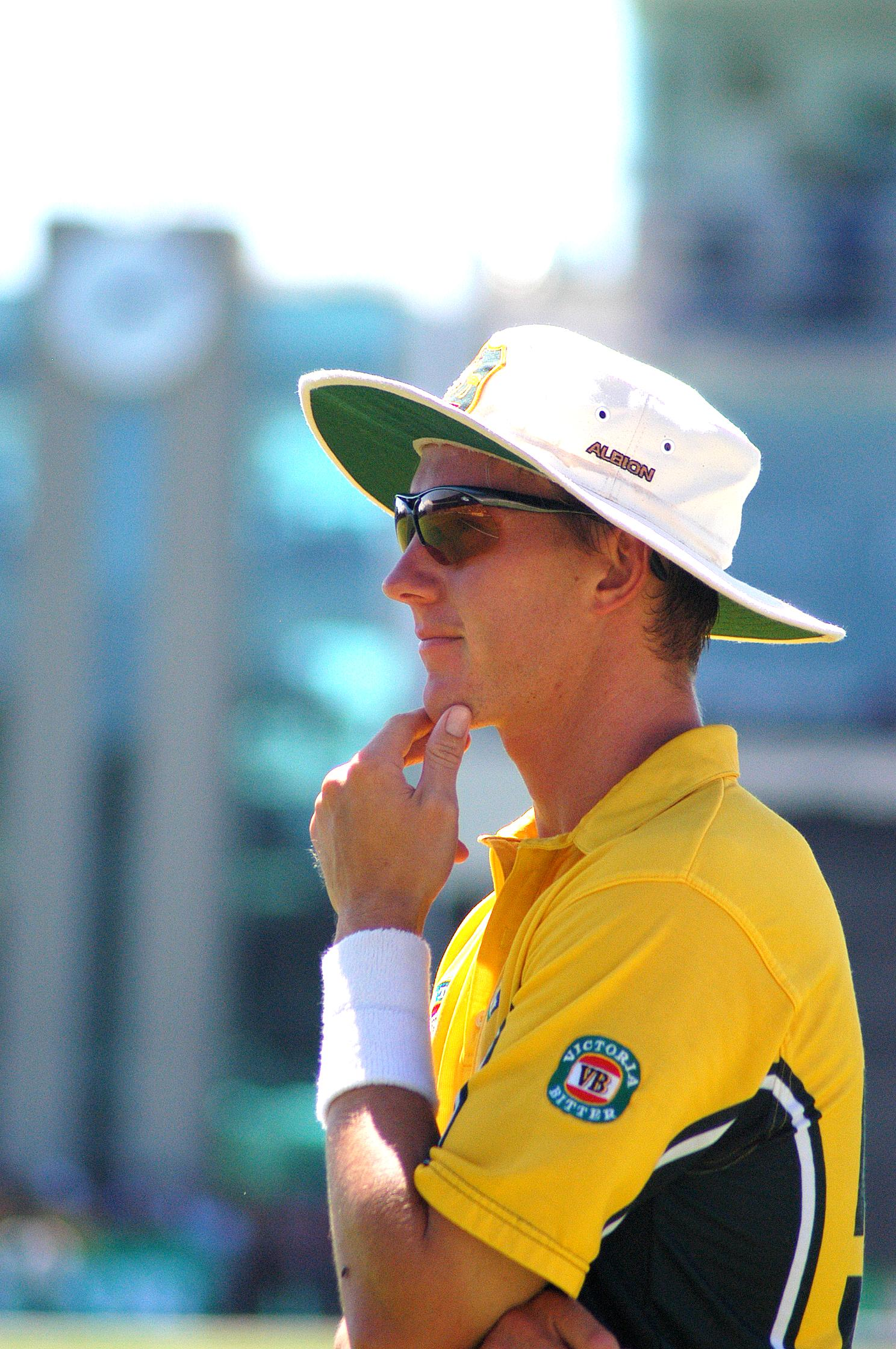
Brett Lee has taken the equal most ODI five-wicket hauls for Australia with nine.

A five-wicket haul refers to a bowler taking five wickets in a single innings.

Pakistani Waqar Younis has taken the most five-wicket hauls in ODI cricket with 13 ahead of Sri Lanka's Muttiah Muralitharan with 10. Australians Brett Lee and Mitchell Starc, who took 9 five-wicket hauls throughout their career, are equal third with Shahid Afridi of Pakistan.

| Rank | Five-wicket hauls | Player | Innings | Balls | Wickets | Period |
|---|---|---|---|---|---|---|
| 1 | 9 | Mitchell Starc† | 121 | 6,240 | 236 | 2010–2023 |
| 1 | 9 | Brett Lee | 217 | 11,185 | 380 | 2000–2012 |
| 3 | 7 | Glenn McGrath | 247 | 12,928 | 380 | 1993–2007 |
| 4 | 3 | Ryan Harris | 20 | 1,031 | 44 | 2009–2012 |
| 4 | 3 | Josh Hazlewood† | 91 | 4,785 | 138 | 2010–2023 |
| 4 | 3 | Jason Gillespie | 96 | 5,144 | 142 | 1996–2005 |
| 4 | 3 | Mitchell Johnson | 150 | 7,489 | 239 | 2005–2015 |
Last updated: 19 August 2025

=== Worst figures in an innings ===
The fifth ODI of the 2005–06 series between Australia and South Africa at Wanderers Stadium in Johannesburg saw many records set including the worst figures ever recorded in an innings in ODI cricket. Australia's Mick Lewis, playing in his seventh and subsequent final match, returned figures of 0/113 from his 10 overs in the second innings of the match. During the ODI series in 2018 where England whitewashed Australia 5–0, Australia recorded their second and fourth worst individual bowling performances. The third ODI at the Trent Bridge saw Andrew Tye and Marcus Stoinis return figures of 0/100 and 0/85, respectively.

| Rank | Figures | Player | Overs | Opposition | Venue | Date |
|---|---|---|---|---|---|---|
| 1 | 0/113 ♠ | Mick Lewis | 10 | South Africa | Wanderers Stadium, Johannesburg, South Africa | 12 March 2006 |
| 1 | 0/113 ♠ | Adam Zampa | 10 | South Africa | Centurion Park, Centurion, South Africa | 15 September 2023 |
| 2 | 0/100 | Andrew Tye | 9 | England | Trent Bridge, Nottingham, England | 19 June 2018 |
| 3 | 0/87 | Stuart Clark | 7 | West Indies | Kinrara Academy Oval, Kuala Lumpur, Malaysia | 18 September 2016 |
| 4 | 0/85 | Marcus Stoinis | 8 | England | Trent Bridge, Nottingham, England | 19 June 2018 |
Last updated: 26 November 2023

=== Most wickets in a bilateral series ===
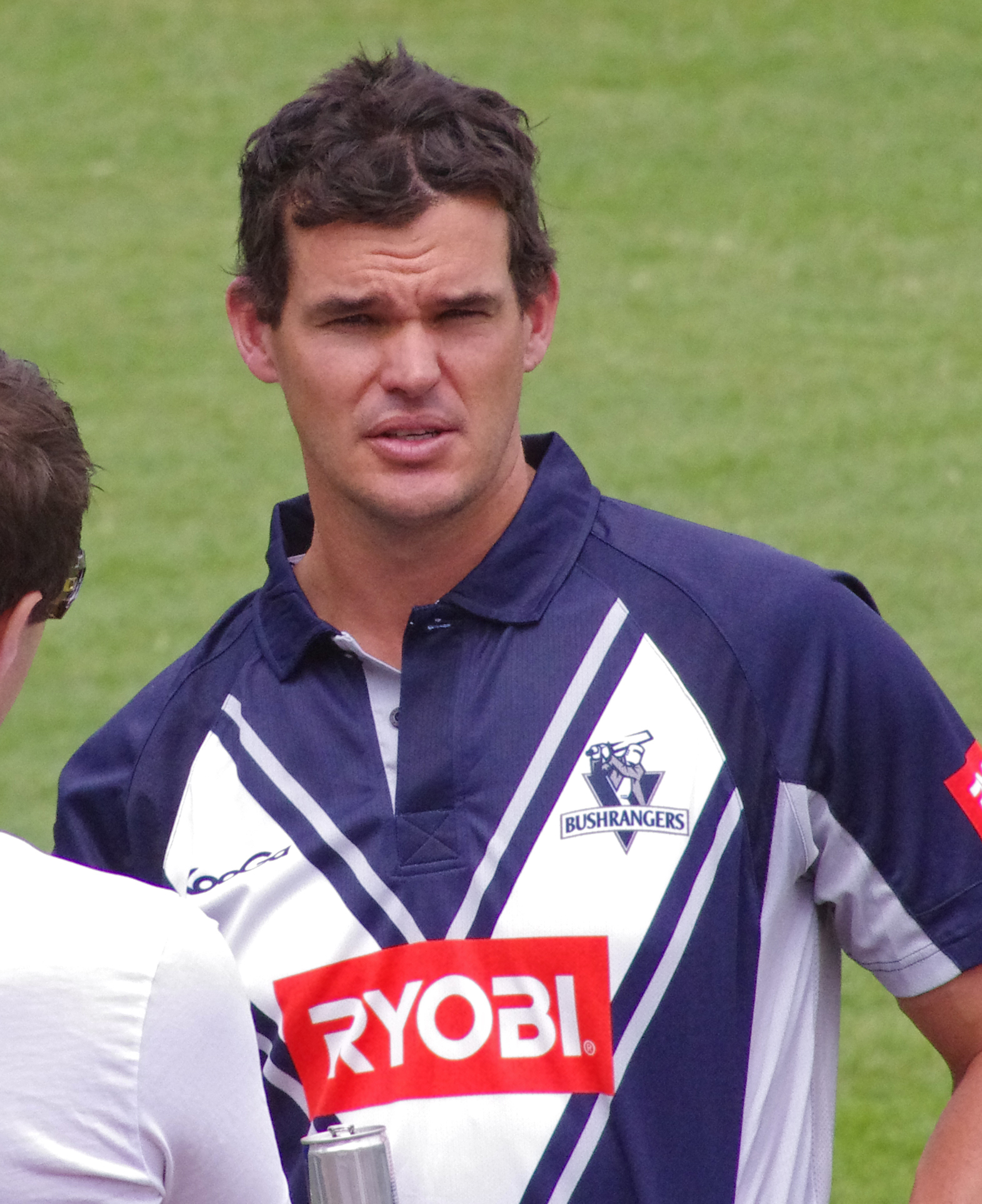
Clint McKay took 14 wickets in the 2009–10 series against Pakistan, the equal-most by any Australian cricketer in an ODI bilateral series.

The seven-match ODI series between India and New Zealand in 2002–03 saw the record set for the most wickets taken by a bowler in an ODI bilateral series. Indian paceman Javagal Srinath achieved a total of 18 wickets to his name. His compatriot Amit Mishra equalled this feat during the five-match 2013 Indian ODI tour of Zimbabwe. Three Australians have taken 14 wickets an ODI bilateral series with Pat Cummins the latest to do so during the 2018–19 home series against India.

| Rank | Wickets | Player | Matches | Series |
|---|---|---|---|---|
| 1 | 14 | Clint McKay | 5 | Pakistani cricket team in Australia in 2009–10 |
| 1 | 14 | Pat Cummins | 5 | Australian cricket team in India in 2018–19 |
| 1 | 14 | Mitchell Johnson | 7 | Australian cricket team in India in 2007 |
| 4 | 13 | Ryan Harris | 3 | Pakistani cricket team in Australia in 2009–10 |
| 4 | 13 | Mitchell Johnson | 5 | Australian cricket team in South Africa in 2008–09 |
| 4 | 13 | Shane Warne | 7 | Australian cricket team in the West Indies in 1998–99 |
Last updated: 31 December 2022

== Wicket-keeping records ==
The wicket-keeper is a specialist fielder who stands behind the stumps being guarded by the batsman on strike and is the only member of the fielding side allowed to wear gloves and leg pads.

=== Most career dismissals ===
A wicket-keeper can be credited with the dismissal of a batsman in two ways, caught or stumped. A fair catch is taken when the ball is caught fully within the field of play without it bouncing after the ball has touched the striker's bat or glove holding the bat, while a stumping occurs when the wicket-keeper puts down the wicket while the batsman is out of his ground and not attempting a run.

Australia's Adam Gilchrist is second only Sri Lanka's Kumar Sangakkara is taking most dismissals in ODI cricket as a designated wicket-keeper, with Sangakkara taking 482 to Gilchrist 472. (Note: This total includes the two dismissals he took for the ICC World XI in the World Cricket Tsunami Appeal match against the ACC Asia XI in 2005.)

| Rank | Dismissals | Player | Matches | Innings | Catches | Stumping | Dis/Inn | Period |
|---|---|---|---|---|---|---|---|---|
| 1 | 470 | Adam Gilchrist | 286 | 280 | 416 | 54 | 1.678 | 1996–2008 |
| 2 | 233 | Ian Healy | 168 | 168 | 194 | 39 | 1.386 | 1988–1997 |
| 3 | 181 | Brad Haddin | 126 | 115 | 170 | 11 | 1.573 | 2001–2015 |
| 4 | 124 | Rod Marsh | 92 | 92 | 120 | 4 | 1.347 | 1971–1984 |
| 5 | 117 | Matthew Wade | 97 | 94 | 108 | 9 | 1.244 | 2012–2021 |
Last updated: 31 December 2022

=== Most career catches ===
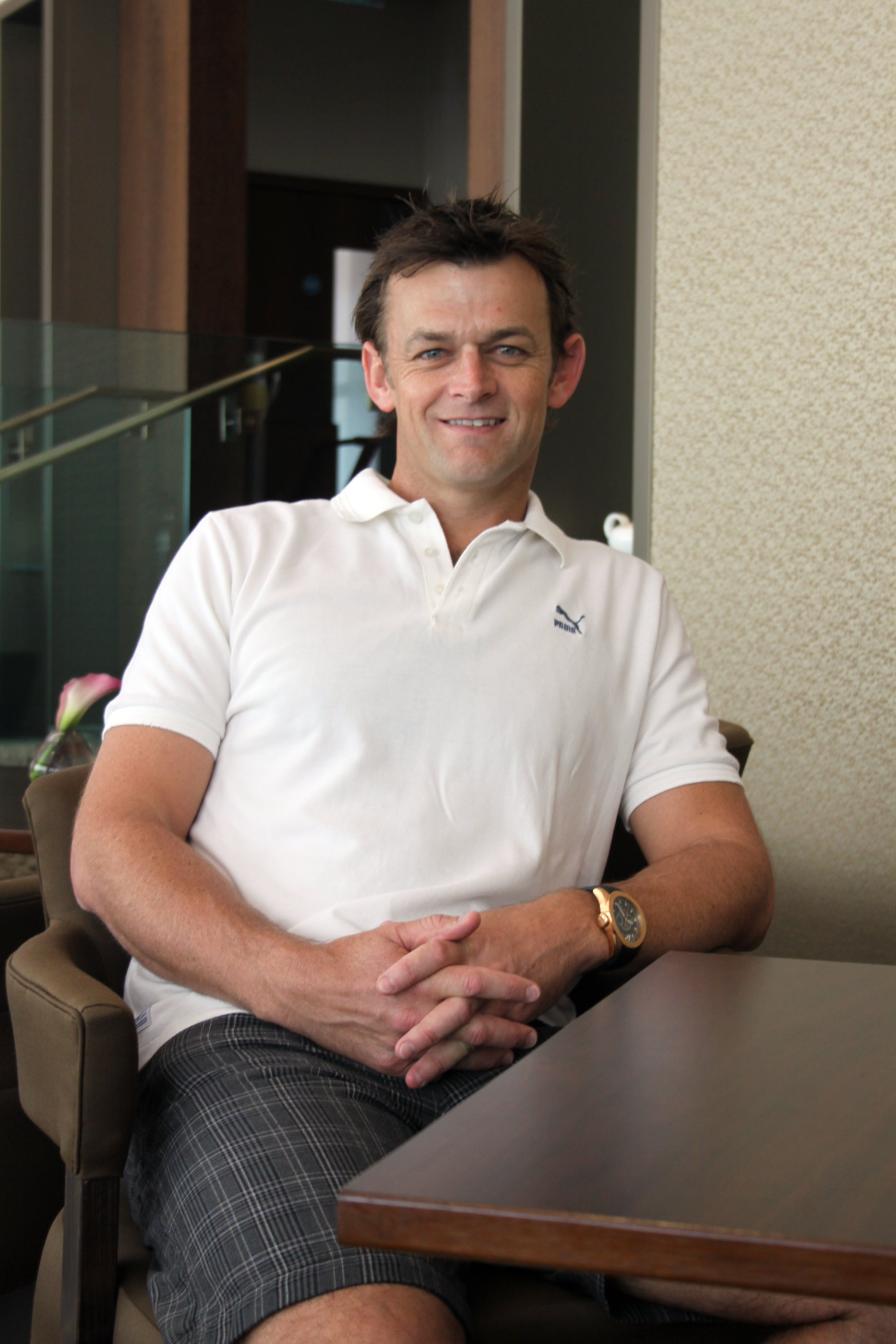
Adam Gilchrist holds the Australian record for the most wicket-keeping ODI dismissals (470), the Australian record for the most ODI stumpings (54) and the ODI record for the most catches as a wicket-keeper (416).

Adam Gilchrist has taken the most number of catches as a designated wicket-keeper in ODI cricket with 417. He sits ahead of South Africa's Mark Boucher and Sangakkara on 402 and 383, respectively.

| Rank | Catches | Player | Matches | Period |
|---|---|---|---|---|
| 1 | 416 ♠ | Adam Gilchrist | 286 | 1996–2008 |
| 2 | 194 | Ian Healy | 168 | 1988–1997 |
| 3 | 170 | Brad Haddin | 126 | 2001–2015 |
| 4 | 120 | Rod Marsh | 92 | 1971–1984 |
| 5 | 108 | Matthew Wade | 97 | 2012–2021 |
Last updated: 31 December 2022

=== Most career stumpings ===
Indian glovemen MS Dhoni with 123 holds the record for the most stumpings in ODI cricket. He is followed by Sangakkara with 99 to his name. Gilchrist is sixth on the list with 55. (Note: This total includes the stumping he made for the ICC World XI in the World Cricket Tsunami Appeal match against the ACC Asia XI in 2005.)

| Rank | Stumpings | Player | Matches | Period |
|---|---|---|---|---|
| 1 | 54 | Adam Gilchrist | 286 | 1996–2008 |
| 2 | 39 | Ian Healy | 168 | 1988–1997 |
| 3 | 11 | Brad Haddin | 126 | 2001–2015 |
| 4 | 9 | Matthew Wade | 97 | 2012–2021 |
| 5 | 8 | Alex Carey† | 81 | 2018–2025 |
Last updated: 19 August 2025

=== Most dismissals in an innings ===
Adam Gilchrist became the first wicket-keeper to take six dismissals in an ODI innings, setting this record against South Africa at Newlands Cricket Ground in April 2000. Since then a further nine glovemen have matched this feat on a single occasion with Gilchrist achieving it five more times. Pakistan's Sarfaraz Ahmed was the most recent wicket-keeper to achieve the milestone, taking six dismissals against South Africa during 2015 World Cup.

| Rank | Dismissals | Player | Opposition | Venue | Date |
|---|---|---|---|---|---|
| 1 | 6 ♠ | Adam Gilchrist | South Africa | Newlands Cricket Ground, Cape Town, South Africa | 14 April 2000 |
| 1 | 6 ♠ | Adam Gilchrist | England | Sydney Cricket Ground, Sydney, Australia | 23 January 2003 |
| 1 | 6 ♠ | Adam Gilchrist | Namibia | Senwes Park, Potchefstroom, South Africa | 27 February 2003 |
| 1 | 6 ♠ | Adam Gilchrist | Sri Lanka | R. Premadasa Stadium, Colombo, Sri Lanka | 27 February 2004 |
| 1 | 6 ♠ | Adam Gilchrist | India | IPCL Sports Complex Ground, Vadodara, India | 11 October 2007 |
| 1 | 6 ♠ | Adam Gilchrist | India | Sydney Cricket Ground, Sydney, Australia | 24 February 2008 |
Last updated: 31 December 2022

=== Most dismissals in a bilateral series ===
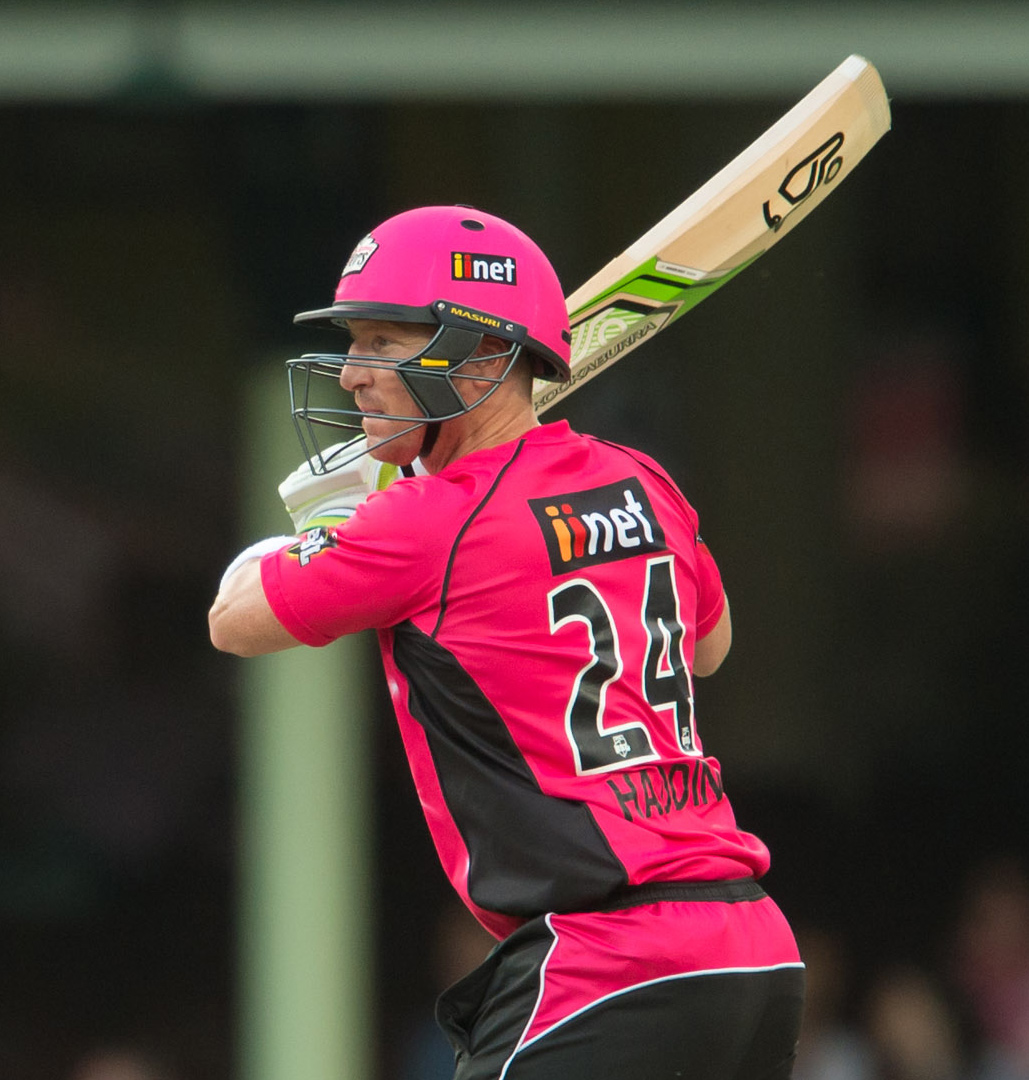
Brad Haddin has taken the most dismissals as an Australian wicket-keeper in an ODI bilateral series, securing 17 during Pakistan's tour of Australia in 2009–10.

The ODI cricket record for the most dismissals taken by a wicket-keeper in a bilateral series is held by Brendon McCullum of New Zealand with 19 taken during the seven-match 2002–03 series against India. He sits ahead of Brad Haddin who during the five-match ODI series against Pakistan in 2009–10 took 17.

| Rank | Dismissals | Player | Matches | Series |
|---|---|---|---|---|
| 1 | 17 | Brad Haddin | 5 | Pakistani cricket team in Australia in 2009–10 |
| 2 | 14 | Adam Gilchrist | 7 | Australian cricket team in South Africa in 2001–02 |
| 2 | 14 | Adam Gilchrist | 7 | Australian cricket team in India in 2007 |
| 4 | 13 | Matthew Wade | 5 | South African cricket team in Australia in 2014–15 |
| 5 | 12 | Adam Gilchrist | 5 | Australian cricket team in New Zealand in 2004–05 |
Last updated: 31 December 2022

== Fielding records ==
=== Most career catches ===
Caught is one of the nine methods a batsman can be dismissed in cricket. (Note: In 2017, The Laws of Cricket were amended, reducing the methods of dismissals from ten to nine, with handled the ball now covered as part of obstructing the field.) A fair catch is defined as a fielder catching the ball, from a legal delivery, fully within the field of play without it bouncing when the ball has touched the striker's bat or glove holding the bat. The majority of catches are caught in the slips, located behind the batsman, next to the wicket-keeper, on the off side of the field. Most slip fielders are top order batsmen.

Sri Lanka's Mahela Jayawardene holds the record for the most catches in ODI cricket by a non-wicket-keeper with 218. He is followed former Australian captain Ricky Ponting who secured 160 catches in his ODI career. (Note: This total includes the one catch he took for the ICC World XI in the World Cricket Tsunami Appeal match against the ACC Asia XI in 2005.)

| Rank | Catches | Player | Matches | Innings | Ct/Inn | Period |
|---|---|---|---|---|---|---|
| 1 | 159 | Ricky Ponting | 374 | 371 | 0.428 | 1995–2012 |
| 2 | 127 | Allan Border | 273 | 270 | 0.470 | 1979–1994 |
| 3 | 111 | Steve Waugh | 325 | 324 | 0.342 | 1986–2002 |
| 4 | 108 | Mark Waugh | 244 | 243 | 0.444 | 1988–2002 |
| 5 | 106 | Michael Clarke | 245 | 243 | 0.436 | 2003–2015 |
Last updated: 19 March 2023

=== Most catches in a bilateral series ===
The seven-match 2002–03 series between New Zealand and India saw the record set for the most catches taken by a non-wicket-keeper in an ODI series with New Zealand captain Stephen Fleming taking 10 catches. South African Jacques Kallis and the West Indies' Kieron Pollard are equal second behind Fleming with nine. Both George Bailey and Aaron Finch leads the list of the Australians with seven catches taken during the 2011–12 tour of the West Indies and the 2012–13 home series against the West Indies, respectively.

| Rank | Catches | Player | Matches | Series |
|---|---|---|---|---|
| 1 | 7 | George Bailey | 5 | Australian cricket team in the West Indies in 2011–12 |
| 1 | 7 | Aaron Finch | 5 | West Indian cricket team in Australia in 2012–13 |
| 3 | 6 | Steve Smith | 3 | Australian cricket team against Pakistan in the UAE in 2014–15 |
| 3 | 6 | Michael Hussey | 5 | Australian cricket team in Sri Lanka in 2011 |
| 3 | 6 | Peter Handscomb | 5 | Australian cricket team against Pakistan in the UAE in 2018–19 |
Last updated: 24 July 2022

== Other records ==
=== Most career matches ===
India's Sachin Tendulkar holds the record for the most ODI matches played with 463, followed by the Sri Lankan pair of Mahela Jayawardene with 448 and Sanath Jayasuriya with 445. Former captain Ricky Ponting is the most capped Australian having represented his country on 374 occasions.

| Rank | Matches | Player | Runs | Wkts | Period |
|---|---|---|---|---|---|
| 1 | 374 | Ricky Ponting | 13,589 | 3 | 1995–2012 |
| 2 | 325 | Steve Waugh | 7,569 | 195 | 1986–2002 |
| 3 | 286 | Adam Gilchrist | 9,595 | - | 1996–2008 |
| 4 | 273 | Allan Border | 6,524 | 73 | 1979–1994 |
| 5 | 249 | Glenn McGrath | 115 | 380 | 1993–2007 |
Last updated: 31 December 2022

=== Most consecutive career matches ===
India's Sachin Tendulkar holds the record for the most consecutive ODI matches played with 185. Andy Flower of Zimbabwe is second with 172 and South African Hansie Cronje with 162 is third. Adam Gilchrist with 97 consecutive matches is the highest ranked Australian player. Flower's run of 172 matches is the highest from ODI debut with Steve Waugh's 87 consecutive matches also starting since his debut in 1986.

| Rank | Matches | Player | Period |
|---|---|---|---|
| 1 | 97 | Adam Gilchrist | 1997–2001 |
| 2 | 87 | Steve Waugh | 1986–1990 |
| 3 | 83 | Allan Border | 1980–1984 |
| 4 | 80 | Geoff Marsh | 1986–1990 |
| 5 | 78 | Michael Bevan | 1995–1999 |
Last updated: 31 December 2022

=== Most matches as captain ===
Ricky Ponting, who led the Australian cricket team from 2002 to 2012, holds the record for the most matches played as captain in ODI cricket with 230. Stephen Fleming, who skippered New Zealand from 1997 to 2007 is second with 218 matches. India's captain from 2007 to 2018, MS Dhoni, is third on the list with 200. In fifth on 178 is Australia's Allan Border who led the side for ten years from 1985 to 1994.

| Rank | Matches | Player | Won | Lost | Tied | NR | %W | Period |
|---|---|---|---|---|---|---|---|---|
| 1 | 229 ♠ | Ricky Ponting | 164 | 51 | 2 | 12 | 76.03 | 2002–2012 |
| 2 | 178 | Allan Border | 107 | 67 | 1 | 3 | 61.42 | 1985–1994 |
| 3 | 106 | Steve Waugh | 67 | 35 | 3 | 1 | 65.23 | 1997–2002 |
| 4 | 74 | Michael Clarke | 50 | 21 | 0 | 3 | 70.42 | 2008–2015 |
| 5 | 67 | Mark Taylor | 36 | 30 | 1 | 0 | 54.47 | 1992–1997 |
Last updated: 31 December 2022

=== Most man of the match awards ===
| Rank | M.O.M Awards | Player | Matches | Period |
|---|---|---|---|---|
| 1 | 31 | Ricky Ponting | 374 | 1995–2012 |
| 2 | 28 | Adam Gilchrist | 286 | 1996–2008 |
| 3 | 21 | Andrew Symonds | 198 | 1998–2009 |
| 3 | 21 | Mark Waugh | 244 | 1988–2002 |
| 3 | 21 | Steve Waugh | 325 | 1986–2002 |
Last updated: 21 September 2023

=== Most man of the series awards ===
| Rank | M.O.S Awards | Player | Matches | Period |
|---|---|---|---|---|
| 1 | 7 | Ricky Ponting | 374 | 1995–2012 |
| 2 | 4 | Mitchell Starc† | 121 | 2010–2023 |
| 2 | 4 | Steve Smith† | 155 | 2010–2023 |
| 2 | 4 | Andrew Symonds | 198 | 1998–2009 |
| 5 | 3 | David Warner | 161 | 2009–2023 |
| 5 | 3 | Michael Hussey | 185 | 2004–2012 |
| 5 | 3 | Brett Lee | 221 | 2000–2012 |
| 5 | 3 | Michael Clarke | 245 | 2003–2015 |
| 5 | 3 | Adam Gilchrist | 286 | 1996–2008 |
Last updated: 26 November 2023

=== Youngest players ===
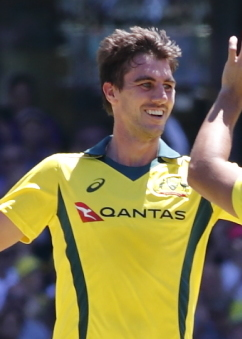
Pat Cummins, pictured aged 24, is the youngest cricketer to play in an ODI match for Australia at the age of 18.

The youngest player to play in an ODI match is claimed to be Hasan Raza at the age of 14 years and 233 days. Making his debut for Pakistan against Zimbabwe on 30 October 1996, there is some doubt as to the validity of Raza's age at the time. The youngest Australian to play ODI cricket was Pat Cummins who at the age of 18 years and 164 days debuted in the first ODI of the series against South Africa in October 2011 eclipsing the record that Josh Hazlewood had set against England 16 months earlier.

| Rank | Age | Player | Opposition | Venue | Date |
|---|---|---|---|---|---|
| 1 | 18 years and 164 days | Pat Cummins | South Africa | Centurion Park, Centurion, South Africa | 19 October 2011 |
| 2 | 19 years and 165 days | Josh Hazlewood | England | Rose Bowl, Southampton, England | 22 June 2010 |
| 3 | 19 years and 260 days | Ray Bright | New Zealand | Carisbrook, Dunedin, New Zealand | 30 March 1974 |
| 4 | 19 years and 267 days | Craig McDermott | West Indies | Melbourne Cricket Ground, Melbourne, Australia | 6 January 1985 |
| 5 | 19 years and 364 days | Mitchell Marsh | South Africa | Centurion Park, Centurion, South Africa | 19 October 2011 |
Last updated: 31 December 2022

=== Oldest players on debut ===
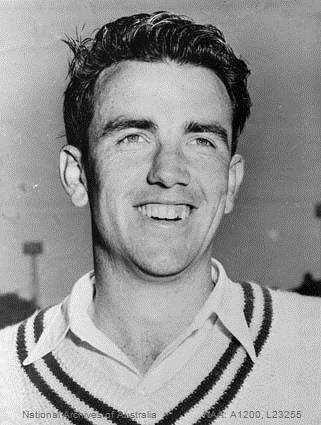
Bob Simpson, pictured aged 21, is both the oldest Australian cricketer to play in an ODI match and the oldest to make his debut for Australia at the age of 42.

At 47 years and 240 days, Nolan Clarke, playing for the Netherlands in 1996 Cricket World Cup, is the oldest player to make his debut in ODI cricket. World Series Cricket resulted in Bob Simpson coming out of retirement to lead Australia on a tour of the West Indies in 1978. The first ODI match was played prior to the Test series where he made his debut in the format aged 42 years and 19 days, the oldest Australian to do so.

| Rank | Age | Player | Opposition | Venue | Date |
|---|---|---|---|---|---|
| 1 | 42 years and 19 days | Bob Simpson | West Indies | Antigua Recreation Ground, St. John's, Antigua and Barbuda | 22 February 1978 |
| 2 | 38 years and 88 days | Bob Holland | West Indies | Sydney Cricket Ground, Sydney, Australia | 15 January 1985 |
| 3 | 35 years and 43 days | Shane Harwood | South Africa | St George's Park, Port Elizabeth, South Africa | 13 April 2009 |
| 4 | 33 years and 328 days | Bill Lawry | England | Melbourne Cricket Ground, Melbourne, Australia | 5 January 1971 |
| 5 | 33 years and 104 days | Dirk Nannes | Scotland | Grange Cricket Club Ground, Edinburgh, Scotland | 28 August 2009 |
Last updated: 31 December 2022

=== Oldest players ===
The Netherlands' fifth and final match in the 1996 Cricket World Cup saw Nolan Clarke set the record for the oldest player to appear in an ODI match at 47 years and 257 days. The oldest Australian cricketer to play in the international format is Bob Simpson. As above, Simpson was called lead the national side for the 1978 West Indies tour. The second ODI following the Test series, was his second and final ODI match where aged 42 years and 68 days he led Australia to victory.

| Rank | Age | Player | Opposition | Venue | Date |
|---|---|---|---|---|---|
| 1 | 42 years and 68 days | Bob Simpson | West Indies | Mindoo Phillip Park, Castries, Saint Lucia | 12 April 1978 |
| 2 | 38 years and 255 days | Allan Border | South Africa | Mangaung Oval, Bloemfontein, South Africa | 8 April 1994 |
| 3 | 38 years and 223 days | Bob Holland | England | Old Trafford Cricket Ground, Manchester, England | 30 May 1985 |
| 4 | 38 years and 83 days | Dan Christian | West Indies | Kensington Oval, Bridgetown, Barbados | 26 July 2021 |
| 5 | 37 years and 157 days | Brad Haddin | New Zealand | Melbourne Cricket Ground, Melbourne, Australia | 29 March 2015 |
Last updated: 31 December 2022

== Partnership records ==
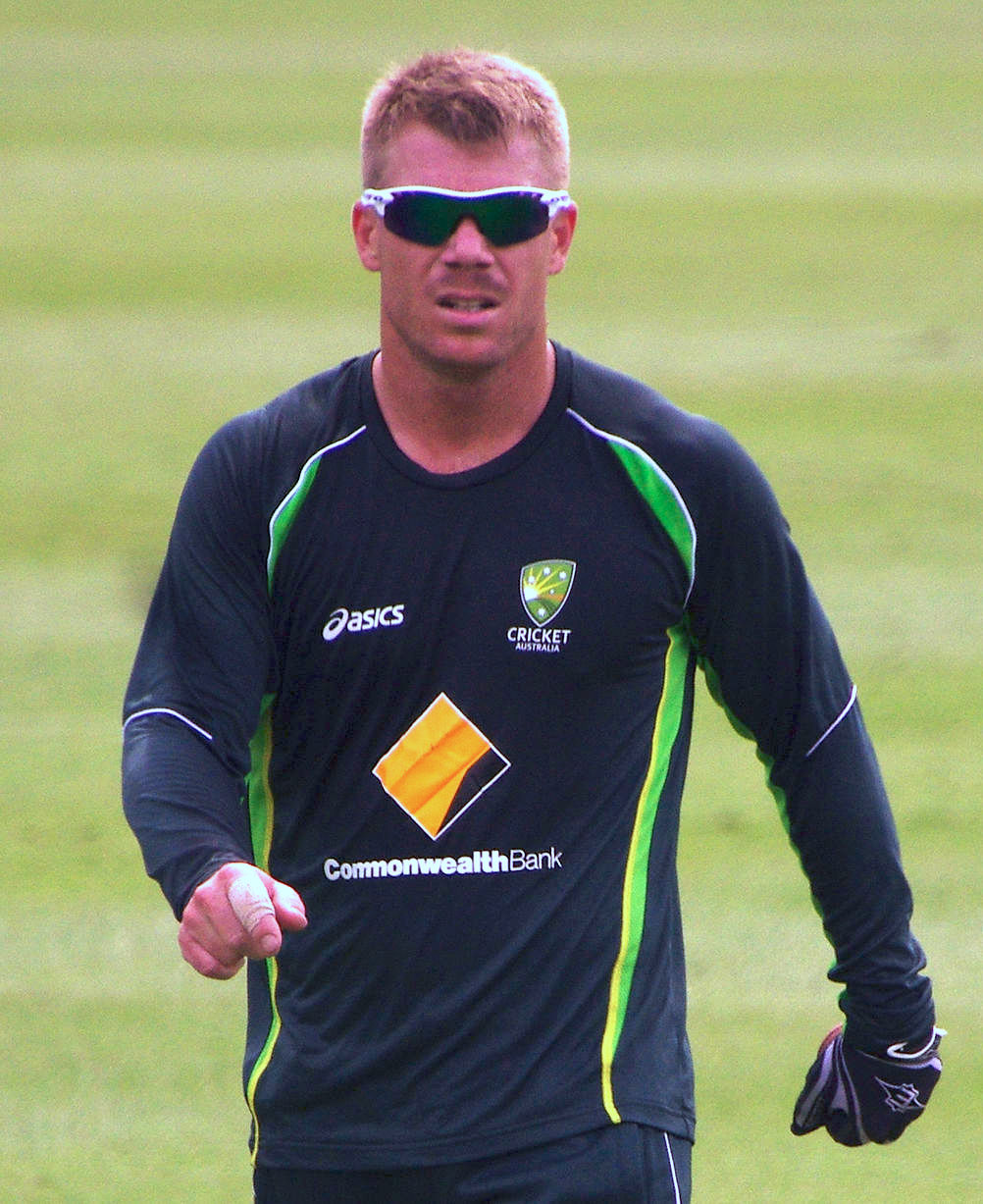
David Warner (pictured) and Travis Head set the highest Australian ODI partnership by runs for any wicket against Pakistan in 2017. Warner also set the next three highest partnership scores alongside Head, Steve Smith and Aaron Finch respectively.

In cricket, two batsmen are always present at the crease batting together in a partnership. This partnership will continue until one of them is dismissed, retires or the innings comes to a close.

=== Highest partnerships by wicket ===
A wicket partnership describes the number of runs scored before each wicket falls. The first wicket partnership is between the opening batsmen and continues until the first wicket falls. The second wicket partnership then commences between the not out batsman and the number three batsman. This partnership continues until the second wicket falls. The third wicket partnership then commences between the not out batsman and the new batsman. This continues down to the tenth wicket partnership. When the tenth wicket has fallen, there is no batsman left to partner so the innings is closed.

As of November 2023, Australia only hold the world record for the 8th-wicket partnership, with a 202* stand between Glenn Maxwell and Pat Cummins against Afghanistan at the 2023 World Cup. The eighth wicket partnership of 119 by the pairing of Paul Reiffel and Shane Warne in 1994 against South Africa was also an ODI wicket partnership record at the time of posting.

| Wicket | Runs | First batsman | Second batsman | Opposition | Venue | Date |
|---|---|---|---|---|---|---|
| 1st wicket | 284 | David Warner | Travis Head | Pakistan | Adelaide Oval, Adelaide, Australia | 26 January 2017 |
| 2nd wicket | 260 | David Warner | Steve Smith | Afghanistan | WACA Ground, Perth, Australia | 4 March 2015 |
| 3rd wicket | 242 | George Bailey | Steve Smith | India | WACA Ground, Perth, Australia | 12 January 2016 |
| 4th wicket | 237 | Ricky Ponting | Andrew Symonds | Sri Lanka | Sydney Cricket Ground, Sydney, Australia | 12 February 2006 |
| 5th wicket | 220 | Michael Clarke | Andrew Symonds | New Zealand | Wellington Regional Stadium, Wellington, New Zealand | 7 December 2005 |
| 6th wicket | 212 | Alex Carey | Glenn Maxwell | England | Old Trafford Cricket Ground, Manchester, England | 16 September 2020 |
| 7th wicket | 123 | Michael Hussey | Brett Lee | South Africa | The Gabba, Brisbane, Australia | 15 January 2006 |
| 8th wicket | 202* | Glenn Maxwell | Pat Cummins | Afghanistan | Wankhede Stadium, Mumbai, India | 7 November 2023 |
| 9th wicket | 115 | James Faulkner | Clint McKay | India | M. Chinnaswamy Stadium, Bangalore, India | 2 November 2013 |
| 10th wicket | 63 | Shane Watson | Andy Bichel | Sri Lanka | Sydney Cricket Ground, Sydney, Australia | 9 January 2003 |
Last updated: 31 December 2022

=== Highest partnerships by runs ===
The highest ODI partnership by runs for any wicket is held by the West Indian pairing of Chris Gayle and Marlon Samuels who put together a second wicket partnership of 372 runs during the 2015 Cricket World Cup against Zimbabwe. Fellow West Indians John Campbell and Shai Hope sit in second with their 365 for the opening stand against Ireland in 2019. India's Sachin Tendulkar and Rahul Dravid hold the third-highest ODI partnership with 331 made in 1999 against New Zealand. The final ODI against Pakistan in 2017 saw openers David Warner and Travis Head make 284, Australia's highest ODI partnership.

| Wicket | Runs | First batsman | Second batsman | Opposition | Venue | Date |
|---|---|---|---|---|---|---|
| 1st wicket | 284 | David Warner | Travis Head | Pakistan | Adelaide Oval, Adelaide, Australia | 26 January 2017 |
| 1st wicket | 269 | David Warner | Travis Head | England | Melbourne Cricket Ground, Melbourne, Australia | 22 November 2022 |
| 2nd wicket | 260 | David Warner | Steve Smith | Afghanistan | WACA Ground, Perth, Australia | 4 March 2015 |
| 1st wicket | 259 | David Warner | Mitchell Marsh | Pakistan | M.Chinnaswamy Stadium, Bengaluru, India | 20 October 2023 |
| 1st wicket | 258* | David Warner | Aaron Finch | India | Wankhede Stadium, Mumbai, India | 14 January 2020 |
Last updated: 31 December 2022

=== Highest overall partnership runs by a pair ===
| Rank | Runs | Innings | Players | Highest | Average | 100/50 | Career span |
|---|---|---|---|---|---|---|---|
| 1 | 5,409 | 117 | Adam Gilchrist & Matthew Hayden | 172 | 47.44 | 16/29 | 2000–2008 |
| 2 | 3,992 | 97 | Adam Gilchrist & Mark Waugh | 206 | 41.58 | 8/20 | 1997–2002 |
| 3 | 3,807 | 96 | David Boon & Geoff Marsh | 212 | 40.07 | 8/26 | 1986–1992 |
| 4 | 3,788 | 80 | Aaron Finch & David Warner | 258* | 47.94 | 12/14 | 2014–2022 |
| 5 | 3,558 | 80 | Adam Gilchrist & Ricky Ponting | 225 | 46.81 | 8/20 | 1997–2008 |
An asterisk (*) signifies an unbroken partnership (i.e. neither of the batsmen was dismissed before either the end of the allotted overs or the required score being reached). Last updated: 22 September 2023

== Umpiring records ==
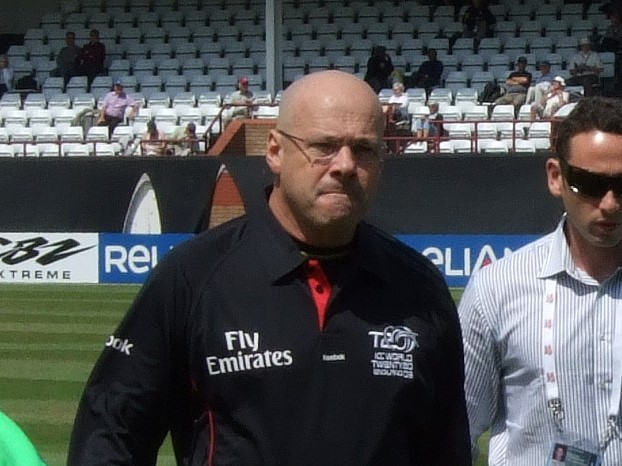
Daryl Harper (pictured) holds the Australian record, alongside Simon Taufel, for the most number of ODI matches umpired with 174.

=== Most matches umpired ===
An umpire in cricket is a person who officiates the match according to the Laws of Cricket. Two umpires adjudicate the match on the field, whilst a third umpire has access to video replays, and a fourth umpire looks after the match balls and other duties. The records below are only for on-field umpires.

Aleem Dar of Pakistan holds the record for the most ODI matches umpired with 219, as of December 2022. Still active, Dar set the record in November 2020 overtaking Rudi Koertzen from South Africa mark of 209. They are followed by New Zealand's Billy Bowden who has officiated in 200. The most experienced Australians are Daryl Harper and Simon Taufel who are equal fifth on the list with each having umpired 174 ODI matches.

| Rank | Matches | Umpire | Period |
|---|---|---|---|
| 1 | 174 | Daryl Harper | 1994–2011 |
| 1 | 174 | Simon Taufel | 1999–2012 |
| 3 | 139 | Darrell Hair | 1991–2008 |
| 4 | 137 | Steve Davis | 1992–2015 |
| 5 | 100 | Rod Tucker | 2008–2023 |
Last updated: 26 November 2022

== See also ==
- List of Australia Test cricket records
- List of Australia Twenty20 International cricket records
