= Australian cricket team in Bangladesh in 2011 =

International cricket tour

	Australia	Bangladesh
- Dates: 9 April 2011 – 13 April 2011
Captains	Michael Clarke	Shakib Al Hasan

One Day International series
- Results: Australia won the 3-match series 3–0
Most runs	Shane Watson (294)	Mahmudullah (134)
Most wickets	Mitchell Johnson (7)	Mashrafe Mortaza (5)
- Player of the series: Shane Watson (Aus)

The Australian cricket team toured Bangladesh between 7 April to 13 April 2011. The tour consisted of three One Day Internationals (ODIs). Michael Clarke was named as the Australian captain, following Ricky Ponting's resignation.

== Squads ==
Australia	Bangladesh
Michael Clarke (c); Shane Watson; Brad Haddin; Ricky Ponting; Cameron White; Michael Hussey; Callum Ferguson; Tim Paine; Steve Smith; Mitchell Johnson; John Hastings; Brett Lee; Xavier Doherty; James Pattinson	Shakib Al Hasan (c); Tamim Iqbal; Imrul Kayes; Raqibul Hasan; Shahriar Nafees; Mushfiqur Rahim; Mahmudullah; Suhrawadi Shuvo; Mashrafe Mortaza; Shafiul Islam; Abdur Razzak

== Tour match ==
=== Bangladesh Cricket Board XI vs Australians ===
7 April 2011
09:30
Scorecard

Australians; 308/6 (50 overs)	v	Bangladesh Cricket Board XI; 218/7 (50 overs)
Michael Hussey 69* (55); Shuvagata Hom 1/18 (7 overs)		Myshukur Rahaman 68 (103); John Hastings 4/15 (7 overs)

Australians won by 90 runs
Fatullah Osmani Stadium, Fatullah
Umpires: Masudur Rahman (Ban) and Nadir Shah (Ban)

- Australians won the toss and elected to bat.

== ODI series ==
=== 1st ODI ===
9 April
09:30
Scorecard

Australia; 270/7 (50 overs)	v	Bangladesh; 210/5 (50 overs)
Michael Clarke 101 (111); Suhrawadi Shuvo 3/44 (8 overs)		Tamim Iqbal 62 (89); Mitchell Johnson 1/23 (8 overs)

Australia won by 60 runs
Sher-e-Bangla National Cricket Stadium, Dhaka
Umpires: Johan Cloete (SA) and Nadir Shah
Player of the match: Michael Clarke (Aus)

- Bangladesh won the toss and elected to field.

=== 2nd ODI ===
11 April
09:30
Scorecard

Bangladesh; 229/7 (50 overs)	v	Australia; 232/1 (26 overs)
Mushfiqur Rahim 81* (80); Mitchell Johnson 3/54 (10 overs)		Shane Watson 185* (96); Shakib Al Hasan 1/35 (7 overs)

Australia won by 9 wickets
Sher-e-Bangla National Cricket Stadium, Dhaka
Umpires: Johan Cloete (SA) and Sharfuddoula (Ban)
Player of the match: Shane Watson (Aus)

- Bangladesh won the toss and elected to bat.
- Shane Watson hit an unbeaten 185, which included a record 15 sixes. His score beat the previous highest ODI score by an Australian (Matthew Hayden's 181 against New Zealand) and the most sixes, previously set by Xavier Marshall with 12 against Canada. The score also included the most boundaries in an ODI innings, beating the previous record of 126 runs in boundaries by Herschelle Gibbs in 2006. It was also the highest proportion of runs scored by a player in an ODI innings, scoring 79.74% of the runs.

=== 3rd ODI ===
13 April
14:00 (D/N)
Scorecard

Australia; 361/8 (50 overs)	v	Bangladesh; 295/6 (50 overs)
Michael Hussey 108 (91); Abdur Razzak 3/58 (9 overs)		Imrul Kayes 93 (95); Mitchell Johnson 3/67 (9 overs)

Australia won by 66 runs
Sher-e-Bangla National Cricket Stadium, Dhaka
Umpires: Johan Cloete (SA) and Enamul Haque
Player of the match: Michael Hussey (Aus)

- Australia won the toss and elected to bat.
- Bangladesh seamer Mashrafe Mortaza took his 150th ODI wicket with the dismissal of Callum Ferguson.
