= Australian cricket team in England and Ireland in 2010 =

The Australian cricket team toured Britain from 22 June to 3 July 2010 where they played the Ireland and England cricket teams. The tour comprised one One Day International against Ireland and five against England.

The match against Ireland was played at Clontarf Cricket Club Ground, Dublin. Ireland, an associate member of the ICC pushing for Test status, gave the top-ranked ODI team in the world a scare. Limiting the Australians to 231/9 from their 50 overs, the Irish were eventually all out for 192 from 42 overs, giving Australia a 39-run victory.

The tour was a lead-in to the Australian series against Pakistan in England, which included two Tests. Pakistan did not host internationals in their own country at the time due to ongoing security problems.

== Ireland ==
Australian cricket team in Ireland in 2010
	Australia	Ireland
- Date: 17 June 2010
Captains	Ricky Ponting	William Porterfield

One Day International series
- Results: Australia won the 1-match series 1–0
Most runs	Tim Paine (81)	William Porterfield (39)
Most wickets	James Hopes (5)	Kevin O'Brien (3)
- Player of the series: James Hopes (Aus)

=== Only ODI ===
17 June 2010
Scorecard

Australia; 231/9 (50 overs)	v	Ireland; 192 (42 overs)
Tim Paine 81 (122); Kevin O'Brien 3/43 (10 overs)		William Porterfield 39 (42); James Hopes 5/14 (9 overs)

Australia won by 39 runs
Clontarf Cricket Club Ground, Dublin
Umpires: Richard Kettleborough (Eng) and Nigel Llong (Eng)
Player of the match: James Hopes (Aus)

- Australia won the toss and elected to bat.

== England ==
Australian cricket team in England in 2010
	Australia	England
- Dates: 22 June – 3 July 2010
Captains	Ricky Ponting	Andrew Strauss

One Day International series
- Results: England won the 5-match series 3–2
Most runs	Michael Clarke (220)	Eoin Morgan (238)
Most wickets	Ryan Harris (10)	Stuart Broad (12)
- Player of the series: Eoin Morgan (Eng)

=== ODI series ===
==== 1st ODI ====
22 June 2010
Scorecard

Australia; 267/7 (50 overs)	v	England; 268/6 (46 overs)
Michael Clarke 87* (97); Luke Wright 2/34 (7 overs)		Eoin Morgan 103* (85); Ryan Harris 3/42 (9 overs)

England won by 4 wickets
Rose Bowl, Southampton
Umpires: Aleem Dar (Pak) and Ian Gould (Eng)
Player of the match: Eoin Morgan (Eng)

- Australia won the toss and elected to bat.
- At 19 years and 165 days, Josh Hazlewood became the youngest player to make his ODI debut for Australia.

==== 2nd ODI ====
24 June 2010
Scorecard

Australia; 239/7 (50 overs)	v	England; 243/6 (45.2 overs)
Cameron White 86* (98); Stuart Broad 4/44 (10 overs)		Eoin Morgan 52 (64); Doug Bollinger 3/46 (10 overs)

England won by 4 wickets
Sophia Gardens, Cardiff
Umpires: Aleem Dar (Pak) and Nigel Llong (Eng)
Player of the match: Stuart Broad (Eng)

- Australia won the toss and elected to bat.

==== 3rd ODI ====
27 June 2010
Scorecard

Australia; 212 (46 overs)	v	England; 214/9 (49.1 overs)
Shane Watson 61 (76); Graeme Swann 4/37 (10 overs)		Andrew Strauss 87 (121); Doug Bollinger 3/20 (10 overs)

England won by 1 wicket
Old Trafford, Manchester
Umpires: Aleem Dar (Pak) and Ian Gould (Eng)
Player of the match: Graeme Swann (Eng)

- England won the toss and elected to field.

==== 4th ODI ====
30 June 2010
Scorecard

Australia; 290/5 (50 overs)	v	England; 212 (42.4 overs)
Michael Clarke 99* (106); Graeme Swann 1/31 (6 overs)		Michael Yardy 57 (63); Ryan Harris 5/32 (8.4 overs)

Australia won by 78 runs
The Oval, London
Umpires: Aleem Dar (Pak) and Richard Kettleborough (Eng)
Player of the match: Ryan Harris (Aus)

- England won the toss and elected to field.

==== 5th ODI ====
3 July 2010
Scorecard

Australia; 277/7 (50 overs)	v	England; 235 (46.3 overs)
Michael Hussey 79 (60); Stuart Broad 4/64 (10 overs)		Paul Collingwood 95 (121); Shaun Tait 4/48 (8.3 overs)

Australia won by 42 runs
Lord's, London
Umpires: Aleem Dar (Pak) and Nigel Llong (Eng)
Player of the match: Shaun Tait (Aus)

- Australia won the toss and elected to bat.

=== Tour match ===
19 June 2010
Scorecard

Middlesex; 273/5 (50 overs)	v	Australians; 277/5 (47.5 overs)
Owais Shah 92 (123); Doug Bollinger 3/24 (8 overs)		Cameron White 106 (120); Tim Murtagh 3/43 (10 overs)

Australians won by 5 wickets
Lord's, London
Umpires: Stephen Gale (Eng) and Peter Hartley (Eng)

- Middlesex won the toss and elected to bat.
