= Australian cricket team in South Africa in 1999–2000 =

The Australian national cricket team toured South Africa in April 2000. They played 3 One Day Internationals.

== Squads ==
ODIs
South Africa	Australia
Hansie Cronje (c); Shaun Pollock (vc); Nicky Boje; Mark Boucher (wk); Herschelle Gibbs; Andrew Hall; Nantie Hayward; Jacques Kallis; Gary Kirsten; Lance Klusener; Neil McKenzie; Makhaya Ntini; Jonty Rhodes; Roger Telemachus	Steve Waugh (c); Michael Bevan; Damien Fleming; Adam Gilchrist (wk); Ian Harvey; Matthew Hayden; Brett Lee; Shane Lee; Damien Martyn; Glenn McGrath; Andrew Symonds; Mark Waugh; Shane Warne (vc)

== LOI series summary ==
=== 1st ODI ===
12 April 2000 (D/N)
Scorecard

Australia; 240/9 (50 overs)	v	South Africa; 241/4 (48 overs)
DR Martyn 74 (91); M Ntini 4/56 (10 overs)		G Kirsten 97 (126); GD McGrath 2/21 (9 overs)

South Africa won by 6 wickets
Kingsmead Cricket Ground, Durban
Umpires: CJ Mitchley and DL Orchard
Player of the match: G Kirsten (SA)

- South Africa won the toss and elected to field.

=== 2nd ODI ===
14 April 2000 (D/N)
Scorecard

South Africa; 144/9 (50 overs)	v	Australia; 145/5 (24.3 overs)
G Kirsten 34 (66); L Klusener 34* (54); B Lee 3/32 (10 overs)		DR Martyn 50 (32); JH Kallis 3/40 (6 overs)

Australia won by 5 wickets
Newlands Cricket Ground, Cape Town
Umpires: RE Koertzen and DL Orchard
Player of the match: DR Martyn (AUS)

- Australia won the toss and elected to field.

=== 3rd ODI ===
16 April 2000
Scorecard

Australia; 205 (49.5 overs)	v	South Africa; 209/6 (47.5 overs)
SR Waugh 51 (86); SM Pollock 4/37 (9.5 overs)		MV Boucher 55* (89); B Lee 3/32 (10 overs)

South Africa won by 4 wickets
New Wanderers, Johannesburg
Umpires: RE Koertzen and CJ Mitchley
Player of the match: L Klusener (SA)

- South Africa won the toss and elected to field.
