= South African cricket team in Australia in 2000 =

The South African national cricket team toured Australia in August 2000, well outside the normal Australian cricket season. They played 3 One Day Internationals. The series was tied 1–1 with all matches played at the covered Docklands Stadium, Melbourne. The series was the first time ODI's were played under a closed roof.

== ODI series summary ==
=== 1st ODI ===
16 August 2000 (D/N)
Scorecard

Australia; 295/5 (50 overs)	v	South Africa; 201/7 (50 overs)
SR Waugh 114* (103); R Telemachus 2/54 (10 overs)		G Kirsten 43 (69); IJ Harvey 3/41 (10 overs)

Australia won by 94 runs
Docklands Stadium, Melbourne
Umpires: DB Hair and SJA Taufel
Player of the match: SR Waugh (AUS)

- South Africa won the toss and elected to field.

=== 2nd ODI ===
18 August 2000 (D/N)
Scorecard

South Africa; 226/8 (50 overs)	v	Australia; 226/9 (50 overs)
JN Rhodes 54 (53); JN Gillespie 3/40 (10 overs)		ME Waugh 48 (64); AJ Hall 3/8 (3 overs)

Match tied
Docklands Stadium, Melbourne
Umpires: DJ Harper and PD Parker
Player of the match: AJ Hall (SA)

- South Africa won the toss and elected to bat.

=== 3rd ODI ===
20 August 2000
Scorecard

South Africa; 206/7 (50 overs)	v	Australia; 198/9 (48 overs)
L Klusener 49 (74); GD McGrath 3/26 (10 overs)		AC Gilchrist 63 (67); N Boje 2/29 (10 overs)

South Africa won by 8 runs
Docklands Stadium, Melbourne
Umpires: DB Hair and DJ Harper
Player of the match: N Boje (SA)

- South Africa won the toss and elected to bat.
- Australia innings limited to 48 overs due to their slow over rate.

== Statistics ==
=== Most runs ===
After the ODI's were played, Australian batsman, Steve Waugh ended up scoring the most runs in the series with 161 runs from three innings which included a century. He finished ahead of fellow Australian batsman, Michael Bevan and Adam Gilchrist with South African players Lance Klusener and Jonty Rhodes rounding out the top five.

Player	Team	Matches	Innings	Not Out	Runs	HS	Average	100s	50s
Steve Waugh	Australia	3	3	1	161	114*	80.50	1	0
Michael Bevan	Australia	3	3	0	142	106	47.33	1	0
Adam Gilchrist	Australia	3	3	0	101	63	33.66	0	1
Lance Klusener	South Africa	3	3	1	86	49	43.00	0	0
Jonty Rhodes	South Africa	2	2	0	70	54	35.00	0	1

=== Most wickets ===
Ian Harvey ended the series as the leading wicket taker with five wickets from three matches at an average of 16.80 runs per wicket. He was followed by Glenn McGrath, Nicky Boje and Roger Telemachus with four wickets while another five bowlers took three.

Player	Team	Matches	Overs	Runs	Wickets	Average	BBI
Ian Harvey	Australia	2	20	84	5	16.80	3/41
Nicky Boje	South Africa	2	20	62	4	15.50	2/29
Glenn McGrath	Australia	3	30	101	4	25.25	3/26
Roger Telemachus	South Africa	3	30	127	4	31.75	2/54
Jason Gillespie	Australia	2	20	79	3	26.33	3/40
