= Indian cricket team in New Zealand in 2002–03 =

Indian cricket team in New Zealand in 2002-03
	India	New Zealand
- Dates: 4 December 2002 – 14 January 2003
Captains	Sourav Ganguly	Stephen Fleming

Test series
- Result: New Zealand won the 2-match series 2–0
Most runs	Rahul Dravid (131)	Mark Richardson (144)
Most wickets	Zaheer Khan (11)	Daryl Tuffey (13)

One Day International series
- Results: New Zealand won the 7-match series 5–2
Most runs	Virender Sehwag (299)	Stephen Fleming (157)
Most wickets	Javagal Srinath (18)	Andre Adams (14)

The India national cricket team toured New Zealand from 4 December 2002 to 14 January 2003 and played a two-match test series along with seven-match one-day international series against New Zealand. New Zealand won the test series 2–0 and also won the ODI series 5–2.

== Test Matches ==
=== 1st Test ===
12–16 December 2002
Scorecard

India	v	New Zealand
161 (58.4 overs); Rahul Dravid 76 (173); Scott Styris 3/28 (6 overs)		247 (91.1 overs); Mark Richardson 89 (245); Zaheer Khan 5/53 (25 overs)
121 (38.1 overs); Sachin Tendulkar 51 (74); Shane Bond 4/33 (13.1 overs)		36/0 (9.3 overs); Lou Vincent 21* (30); Harbhajan Singh 0/2 (2 overs)

New Zealand won by 10 wickets
Basin Reserve, Wellington
Umpires: Asoka de Silva (SL) and Daryl Harper (Aus)
Player of the match: Mark Richardson (NZ)

- New Zealand won the toss and decided to field.
- Jacob Oram (NZ) made his Test debut.

=== 2nd Test ===
19–23 December 2002
Scorecard

India	v	New Zealand
99 (38.2 overs); VVS Laxman 23 (46); Daryl Tuffey 4/12 (9 overs)		94 (38.2 overs); Stephen Fleming 21 (66); Zaheer Khan 5/29 (13.2 overs)
154 (43.5 overs); Rahul Dravid 39 (100); Daryl Tuffey 4/41 (16 overs)		160/6 (56.2 overs); Stephen Fleming 32 (58); Ashish Nehra 3/34 (16.2 overs)

New Zealand won by 4 wickets
Seddon Park, Hamilton
Umpires: Asoka de Silva (SL) and Daryl Harper (Aus)
Player of the match: Daryl Tuffey (NZ)

- New Zealand won the toss and decided to field.
- This was the first time in 21 years that players of either team failed to score a Test half-century.

== ODI Series ==
=== 1st ODI ===
26 December 2002
Scorecard

India; 108 (32.5 overs)	v	New Zealand; 109/7 (37.4 overs)
Shiv Sunder Das 30 (60); Jacob Oram 5/26 (10 overs)		Jacob Oram 27* (54); Javagal Srinath 4/23 (10 overs)

New Zealand won by 3 wickets
Eden Park, Auckland
Umpires: Billy Bowden (NZ) and Asoka De Silva (SL)
Player of the match: Jacob Oram (NZ)

- New Zealand won the toss and elected to field.

=== 2nd ODI ===
29 December 2002
Scorecard

New Zealand; 254/9 (50 overs)	v	India; 219 (43.4 overs)
Mathew Sinclair 78 (126); Javagal Srinath 3/34 (10 overs)		Virender Sehwag 108 (119); Kyle Mills 3/45 (9.4 overs)

New Zealand won by 35 runs
McLean Park, Napier
Umpires: Doug Cowie (NZ) and Asoka De Silva (SL)
Player of the match: Virender Sehwag (Ind)

- India won the toss and elected to field.

=== 3rd ODI ===
1 January 2003
Scorecard

India; 108 (41.1 overs)	v	New Zealand; 109/5 (26.5 overs)
Rahul Dravid 20 (59); Paul Hitchcock 3/30 (8 overs)		Nathan Astle 32 (30); Ajit Agarkar 3/26 (8.5 overs)

New Zealand won by 5 wickets
AMI Stadium, Christchurch
Umpires: Doug Cowie (NZ) and Asoka De Silva (SL)
Player of the match: Daryl Tuffey (NZ)

- India won the toss and elected to bat.

=== 4th ODI ===
4 January 2003
Scorecard

India; 122 (43.4 overs)	v	New Zealand; 123/3 (25.4 overs)
Yuvraj Singh 25 (61); Andre Adams 5/22 (8.4 overs)		Stephen Fleming 47 (59); Javagal Srinath 3/35 (9.4 overs)

New Zealand won by 7 wickets
Queenstown Events Centre, Queenstown
Umpires: Doug Cowie (NZ) and Asoka De Silva (SL)
Player of the match: Andre Adams (NZ)

- New Zealand won the toss and elected to field.

=== 5th ODI ===
8 January 2003
Scorecard

New Zealand; 168 (42.4 overs)	v	India; 169/8 (43.2 overs)
Andre Adams 35 (27); Zaheer Khan 3/30 (8 overs)		Yuvraj Singh 54 (85); Scott Styris 2/29 (9 overs)

India won by 2 wickets
Westpac Stadium, Wellington
Umpires: Billy Bowden (NZ) and Daryl Harper (AUS)
Player of the match: Zaheer Khan (Ind)

- New Zealand won the toss and elected to bat.

=== 6th ODI ===
11 January 2003
Scorecard

New Zealand; 199/9 (50 overs)	v	India; 200/9 (48.5 overs)
Lou Vincent 53 (107); Javagal Srinath 3/13 (10 overs)		Virender Sehwag 112 (139); Andre Adams 3/41 (9.5 overs)

India won by 1 wicket
Eden Park, Auckland
Umpires: Billy Bowden (NZ) and Daryl Harper (AUS)
Player of the match: Virender Sehwag (NZ)

- India won the toss and elected to field.

=== 7th ODI ===
11 January 2003
Scorecard

India; 122 (44.5 overs)	v	New Zealand; 125/4 (28.4 overs)
Yuvraj Singh 33 (58); Andre Adams 4/21 (8.5 overs)		Stephen Fleming 60 (92); Javagal Srinath 2/28 (8.4 overs)

New Zealand won by 6 wickets
Seddon Park, Hamilton
Umpires: Doug Cowie (NZ) and Daryl Harper (AUS)
Player of the match: Stephen Fleming (NZ)

- New Zealand won the toss and elected to field.
