= 2006–07 Chappell–Hadlee Trophy =

- Date: 16–20 February 2007
- Location: New Zealand
- Result: New Zealand won the three-match series 3–0
Teams
- Australia: New Zealand
Captains
- Michael Hussey: Stephen Fleming
Most runs
- ML Hayden (219) MEK Hussey (160) BJ Hodge (131): CD McMillan (169); LRPL Taylor (128); PG Fulton (127)
Most wickets
- SR Watson (5) MG Johnson (3) NW Bracken (3): SE Bond (6); MR Gillespie (5); DL Vettori (3)

The 2006–07 Chappell–Hadlee Trophy was the third Chappell–Hadlee Trophy, a three-match ODI series between Australia and New Zealand. The series was played in New Zealand between 16 February and 20 February 2007.

New Zealand beat the Australians 3–0 in the series. The Australians were without some of their leading players for this short tour. After the series, Australia went on a losing streak of five matches, which included the final of the Commonwealth Bank Series in 2007.

== Fixtures ==
=== 1st ODI ===
16 February 2007
14:00 (D/N)
Scorecard

Australia; 148 (49.3 overs)	v	New Zealand; 149/0 (27 overs)
MEK Hussey 42 (96); SE Bond 5/23 (9.3 overs)		L Vincent 73* (97)

New Zealand won by 10 wickets
WestpacTrust Stadium, Wellington
Umpires: Aleem Dar (Pak) and BF Bowden (NZ)
Player of the match: Shane Bond (NZ)

- New Zealand won the toss and elected to field.

=== 2nd ODI ===
18 February 2007
11:00
Scorecard

Australia; 336/4 (50 overs)	v	New Zealand; 337/5 (48.5 overs)
MEK Hussey 105 (84); SE Bond 1/39 (9 overs)		Ross Taylor 117 (126); SR Watson 3/56 (10 overs)

New Zealand won by 5 wickets
Eden Park, Auckland
Umpires: Aleem Dar (Pak) and AL Hill (NZ)
Player of the match: Ross Taylor (NZ)

- New Zealand won the toss and elected to field.

=== 3rd ODI ===
20 February 2007
14:00 (D/N)
Scorecard

Australia; 346/5 (50 overs)	v	New Zealand; 350/9 (49.3 overs)
ML Hayden 181 (166); JS Patel 2/70 (10 overs)		CD McMillan 117 (96); MG Johnson 3/81 (10 overs)

New Zealand won by 1 wicket
Seddon Park, Hamilton
Umpires: Aleem Dar (Pak) and GAV Baxter (NZ)
Player of the match: ML Hayden (Aus)

- Australia won the toss and elected to bat.
- AC Voges (Aus) made his ODI debut.
- ML Hayden (Aus) made the then-highest individual score of the losing side in a one-day international.

== Squads ==
New Zealand
Name	Style	Domestic team
Stephen Fleming (c)	LHB, RM	Wellington
Shane Bond	RHB, RF	Canterbury
James Franklin	LHB, LFM	Wellington
Peter Fulton	RHB, RM	Canterbury
Mark Gillespie	RHB, RFM	Wellington
Brendon McCullum (wk)	RHB, WK	Canterbury
Craig McMillan	RHB, RM	Canterbury
Jacob Oram	LHB, RFM	Central Districts
Scott Styris	RHB, RM	Auckland
Ross Taylor	RHB, OB	Central Districts
Daryl Tuffey	RHB, RFM	Northern Districts
Daniel Vettori	LHB, SLA	Northern Districts
Lou Vincent	RHB, RM	Auckland

Australia
Name	Style	Domestic team
Michael Hussey (c)	LHB, RM	Western Australia
Nathan Bracken	RHB, LFM	New South Wales
Michael Clarke (vc)	RHB, SLA	New South Wales
Brad Haddin (wk)	RHB, WK	New South Wales
Matthew Hayden	LHB, RM	Queensland
Brad Hodge	RHB, OB	Victoria
Brad Hogg	LHB, SLC	Western Australia
Phil Jaques	LHB, LM	New South Wales
Mitchell Johnson	LHB, LFM	Queensland
Glenn McGrath	RHB, RMF	New South Wales
Shaun Tait	RHB, RF	South Australia
Adam Voges	RHB, SLC	Western Australia
Shane Watson	RHB, RFM	Queensland
Cameron White	RHB, LB	Victoria
