= Australian cricket team in India in 2019–20 =

International cricket tour

Australia cricket team in India in 2019–20
	India	Australia
- Dates: 14 – 19 January 2020
Captains	Virat Kohli	Aaron Finch

One Day International series
- Results: India won the 3-match series 2–1
Most runs	Virat Kohli (183)	Steve Smith (229)
Most wickets	Mohammed Shami (7)	Adam Zampa (5)
- Player of the series: Virat Kohli (Ind)

The Australia cricket team toured India in January 2020 to play three One Day International (ODI) matches. Normally, Australia would have played the matches at home, but international fixture congestion caused the ODIs to be brought forward. India won the series 2–1, after losing the opening match by ten wickets. During the third and final ODI of the series, Virat Kohli scored his 11,208th run across all formats as a captain in international cricket, the most by a batsman for India.

== Squads ==
ODIs
India	Australia
Virat Kohli (c); Rohit Sharma (vc); K. S. Bharat; Jasprit Bumrah; Yuzvendra Chahal; Shikhar Dhawan; Shivam Dube; Shreyas Iyer; Ravindra Jadeja; Kedar Jadhav; Manish Pandey; Rishabh Pant (wk); KL Rahul (wk); Navdeep Saini; Mohammed Shami; Shardul Thakur; Kuldeep Yadav	Aaron Finch (c); Alex Carey (vc, wk); Pat Cummins (vc); ~~Sean Abbott~~; Ashton Agar; Peter Handscomb; Josh Hazlewood; Marnus Labuschagne; Kane Richardson; D'Arcy Short; Steve Smith; Mitchell Starc; Ashton Turner; David Warner; Adam Zampa

Ahead of the tour, D'Arcy Short was named as the replacement for Sean Abbott in Australia's squad, after Abbott suffered side-strain. Prior to the second ODI, K. S. Bharat was called up to the Indian squad as a cover for Rishabh Pant, who was ruled out of the match with a concussion.

== ODI series ==
=== 1st ODI ===
14 January 2020
13:30 (D/N)
Scorecard

India; 255 (49.1 overs)	v	Australia; 258/0 (37.4 overs)
Shikhar Dhawan 74 (91); Mitchell Starc 3/56 (10 overs)		David Warner 128* (112)

Australia won by 10 wickets
Wankhede Stadium, Mumbai
Umpires: Michael Gough (Eng) and Chettithody Shamshuddin (Ind)
Player of the match: David Warner (Aus)

- Australia won the toss and elected to field.
- Marnus Labuschagne (Aus) made his ODI debut.
- David Warner became the fastest batsman for Australia, and the fourth fastest batsman overall in terms of innings, to score 5,000 runs in ODIs (115).
- David Warner and Aaron Finch (Aus) made the highest partnership for any wicket against India in ODIs.
- This was Australia's biggest win, in terms of wickets, against India in ODIs.

=== 2nd ODI ===
17 January 2020
13:30 (D/N)
Scorecard

India; 340/6 (50 overs)	v	Australia; 304 (49.1 overs)
Shikhar Dhawan 96 (90); Adam Zampa 3/50 (10 overs)		Steve Smith 98 (102); Mohammed Shami 3/77 (10 overs)

India won by 36 runs
Saurashtra Cricket Association Stadium, Rajkot
Umpires: Richard Kettleborough (Eng) and Virender Sharma (Ind)
Player of the match: KL Rahul (Ind)

- Australia won the toss and elected to field.
- KL Rahul (Ind) scored his 1,000th run in ODIs.
- Kuldeep Yadav became the fastest spin bowler for India, in terms of innings, to take 100 wickets in ODIs (58).

=== 3rd ODI ===
19 January 2020
13:30 (D/N)
Scorecard

Australia; 286/9 (50 overs)	v	India; 289/3 (47.3 overs)
Steve Smith 131 (132); Mohammed Shami 4/63 (10 overs)		Rohit Sharma 119 (128); Ashton Agar 1/38 (10 overs)

India won by 7 wickets
M. Chinnaswamy Stadium, Bengaluru
Umpires: Michael Gough (Eng) and Virender Sharma (Ind)
Player of the match: Rohit Sharma (Ind)

- Australia won the toss and elected to bat.
- Steve Smith (Aus) scored his 4,000th run in ODIs.
- Rohit Sharma (Ind) scored his 9,000th run in ODIs.
- Virat Kohli (Ind) became the fastest batsman to scored 5,000 runs, in terms of innings, as captain of a team in ODIs (82).
- Virat Kohli also became the fifth batsman to make his hundredth score of 50-plus in ODIs.
