= Australian cricket team in South Africa in 2005–06 =

Australia in South Africa in 2005-06
	Australia	South Africa
- Dates: 26 February – 4 April 2006
Captains	Ricky Ponting	Graeme Smith

Test series
- Result: Australia won the 3-match series 3–0
Most runs	Ricky Ponting (348)	Jacques Kallis (227)
Most wickets	Stuart Clark (20)	Makhaya Ntini (19)
- Player of the series: Stuart Clark (Aus)

One Day International series
- Results: South Africa won the 5-match series 3–2
Most runs	Ricky Ponting (233)	Herschelle Gibbs (258)
Most wickets	Nathan Bracken (9)	Makhaya Ntini (11)
- Player of the series: Shaun Pollock (SA)

Twenty20 International series
- Results: South Africa won the 1-match series 1–0
Most runs	Brett Lee (43)	Graeme Smith (89)
Most wickets	Mick Lewis (2)	Andrew Hall (3)
- Player of the series: Graeme Smith (SA)

The Australian cricket team toured South Africa for cricket matches during the 2005–06 South African cricket season. Australia won the Tests with a 3–0 whitewash, but lost both the limited overs series, the one-off Twenty20 and the five-match ODI, which was concluded with what was described as "the greatest ODI ever".

== Squads ==
Australia
- Ricky Ponting (c)
- Adam Gilchrist (wk)
- Nathan Bracken
- Stuart Clark
- Michael Clarke
- Brad Hogg
- Michael Hussey
- Phil Jaques
- Mitchell Johnson
- Simon Katich
- Brett Lee
- Mick Lewis
- Damien Martyn
- Andrew Symonds
- Shane Watson
South Africa
- Graeme Smith (c)
- Mark Boucher (wk)
- AB de Villiers
- Boeta Dippenaar
- Herschelle Gibbs
- Andrew Hall
- Justin Kemp
- Charl Langeveldt
- André Nel
- Makhaya Ntini
- Robin Peterson
- Shaun Pollock
- Ashwell Prince
- Johannes van der Wath
Additional squad members for South Africa in Twenty20
- Loots Bosman
- Neil McKenzie
- Justin Ontong
- Robin Peterson
- Roger Telemachus
- Thandi Tshabalala

== T20I series ==
=== Only T20I ===
24 February 2006 (D/N)
Scorecard

South Africa; 201/4 (20 overs)	v	Australia; 199/7 (20 overs)
GC Smith 89* (58); HH Gibbs 56 (34); ML Lewis 2/31 (4 overs)		B Lee 43* (21); GB Hogg 41 (25); AJ Hall 3/22 (4 overs)

South Africa won by 2 runs
New Wanderers, Johannesburg
Umpires: M Erasmus and KH Hurter
Player of the match: GC Smith (SA)

- South Africa won the toss and elected to bat

== ODI series ==
=== 1st ODI ===
26 February 2006
Scorecard

Australia; 229/8 (47 overs)	v	South Africa; 207/4 (37.3 overs)
MEK Hussey 56 (73); MJ Clarke 53 (82); SM Pollock 3/23 (10 overs); M Ntini 2/42 (9 overs)		GC Smith 119* (124); AB de Villiers 43 (30); NW Bracken 1/27 (8 overs); GB Hogg 1/30 (8 overs)

South Africa won by 6 wickets (D/L method)
Centurion Park, Centurion, Gauteng
Umpires: BG Jerling (SA) and JW Lloyds (ENG)
Player of the match: GC Smith (SA)

- Australia won the toss and decided to bat.
- Australia innings was reduced to 47 overs. South Africa target was 204 runs in 41 overs

=== 2nd ODI ===
3 March 2006 (D/N)
Scorecard

South Africa; 289/7 (50 overs)	v	Australia; 93 (34.3 overs)
HH Gibbs 66 (71); JM Kemp 51* (41); SR Watson 2/46 (10 overs); GB Hogg 2/48 (9 overs)		SR Watson 27 (39); MEK Hussey 22 (49); M Ntini 6/22 (9.3 overs); A Nel 3/30 (8 overs)

South Africa won by 196 runs
Newlands Cricket Ground, Cape Town
Umpires: KH Hurter (SA) and JW Lloyds (ENG)
Player of the match: M Ntini (SA)

- South Africa won the toss and elected to bat

This was Australia's second worst loss in their history of One Day internationals.

=== 3rd ODI ===
5 March 2006
Scorecard

Australia; 254/6 (50 overs)	v	South Africa; 230 (47.2 overs)
RT Ponting 62 (82); DR Martyn 51 (69); SM Pollock 2/45 (10 overs); AJ Hall 1/39 (9 overs)		SM Pollock 69 (74); AB de Villiers 68 (92); B Lee 4/48 (9 overs); SR Watson 2/49 (10 overs)

Australia won by 24 runs
St. George's Park, Port Elizabeth
Umpires: BG Jerling (SA) and JW Lloyds (ENG)
Player of the match: B Lee (AUS)

- South Africa won the toss and elected to field

=== 4th ODI ===
10 March 2006 (D/N)
Scorecard

South Africa; 246/9 (50 overs)	v	Australia; 247/9 (49.1 overs)
HH Dippenaar 101 (145); SM Pollock 53* (33); NW Bracken 2/36 (10 overs); ML Lewis 2/38 (10 overs)		AC Symonds 76 (71); SM Katich 46 (68); R Telemachus 3/34 (10 overs); JH Kallis 2/46 (9 overs)

Australia won by 1 wicket
Kingsmead Cricket Ground, Durban
Umpires: KH Hurter (SA) and JW Lloyds (ENG)
Player of the match: HH Dippenaar (SA)

- South Africa won the toss and elected to bat

=== 5th ODI ===
The 5th One Day International cricket match between South Africa and Australia, played on 12 March 2006 at New Wanderers Stadium, Johannesburg, has been acclaimed by many media commentators as being one of the greatest One Day International matches ever played. The match broke many cricket records, including both the first and the second team innings score of over 400 runs. Australia won the toss and elected to bat first. They scored 434 for 4 off their 50 overs, beating the previous record of 398-5 by Sri Lanka against Kenya in 1996. In reply, South Africa scored 438–9, winning by one wicket with one ball to spare.

March 12 2006
Scorecard

Australia; 434/4 (50 overs)	v	South Africa; 438/9 (49.5 overs)
Ricky Ponting 164 (105); Roger Telemachus 2/87 (10 overs)		Herschelle Gibbs 175 (111); Nathan Bracken 5/67 (10 overs)

South Africa won by 1 wicket
New Wanderers Stadium, Johannesburg
Umpires: Aleem Dar (Pakistan) and Brian Jerling (South Africa)
Player of the match: Herschelle Gibbs (RSA) & Ricky Ponting (Aus)

- Australia won the toss and chose to bat
- Australia scored the first ever team total over 400 in men's cricket in ODIs.
- Australia scored the highest ever team total in ODIs (434); surpassing Sri Lanka's total of 398 in 1996; before South Africa surpassed it in the same match (438). [Later Surpassed]
- South Africa chasing 434 was the highest successful ODI chase of all time and the highest team total in the second innings in ODIs.
- This match recorded the highest aggregate runs in a match: (872), surpassing the previous record of 693 set by India and Pakistan in 2004.
- This match recorded the most sixes hit in a match in ODIs (26) and the most fours hit in a match in ODIs (89). [Later Surpassed]
- Ricky Ponting (AUS) scored the fastest 150 in ODIs, reaching this target in 99 balls. [Later Surpassed]
- Mick Lewis conceded the most runs in an innings in ODIs (113). He also became the first bowler to concede 100 runs in a fifty-over ODI match. [Later Surpassed]

== Test series ==
=== 1st Test ===
16–18 March 2006
Scorecard

South Africa	v	Australia
205 (63.5 overs); N Boje 31 (60); S Clark 5/55 (17 overs)		308 (87.2 overs); ML Hayden 94 (236); JH Kallis 3/51 (12 overs)
197 (63.5 overs); JA Rudolph 41 (146); SR Clark 4/34 (16 overs)		95/3 (27.1 overs); JL Langer 34 (91); M Ntini 3/28 (10 overs)

Australia won by 7 wickets
Newlands Stadium, Cape Town
Umpires: Aleem Dar (PAK) and BR Doctrove (WI)
Player of the match: SR Clark (AUS)

- South Africa won the toss and elected to bat.
- The match was scheduled for five days but completed in three.
- SR Clark (AUS) made his Test debut.

As well as gaining his Test match debut, Stuart Clark, in scoring the best bowling figures for both of South Africa's innings, won himself Man of The Match.

=== 2nd Test ===
24–28 March 2006
Scorecard

Australia	v	South Africa
369 (127.1 overs); RT Ponting 103 (225); M Ntini 3/81 (24 overs)		267 (88.4 overs); JH Kallis 114 (223); B Lee 5/69 (19.4 overs)
307/4dec (82.4 overs); RT Ponting 116 (187); N Boje 2/87 (26.4 overs)		297 (99.5 overs); MV Boucher 51* (156); SK Warne 6/86 (35.5 overs)

Australia won by 112 runs
Kingsmead Cricket Ground, Durban
Umpires: SA Bucknor (WI) and BR Doctrove (WI)
Player of the match: SK Warne (AUS)

- Australia won the toss and elected to bat.

=== 3rd Test ===
31 March-4 April 2006
Scorecard

South Africa	v	Australia
303 (97.2 overs); AG Prince 93 (170); B Lee 3/57 (24 overs)		270 (62.5 overs); MEK Hussey 73 (153); M Ntini 6/100 (18.5 overs)
258 (71.3 overs); MV Boucher 63 (92); SR Clark 4/64 (18 overs)		294/8 (91.4 overs); DR Martyn 101 (208); M Ntini 4/78 (26 overs)

Australia won by 2 wickets
Wanderers Stadium, Johannesburg
Umpires: SA Bucknor (WI) and AL Hill (NZ)
Player of the match: B Lee (Aus)

- South Africa won the toss and elected to bat.
- Justin Langer (Aus) played in his 100th Test.
