= List of 400-plus innings scores in One Day International cricket matches =

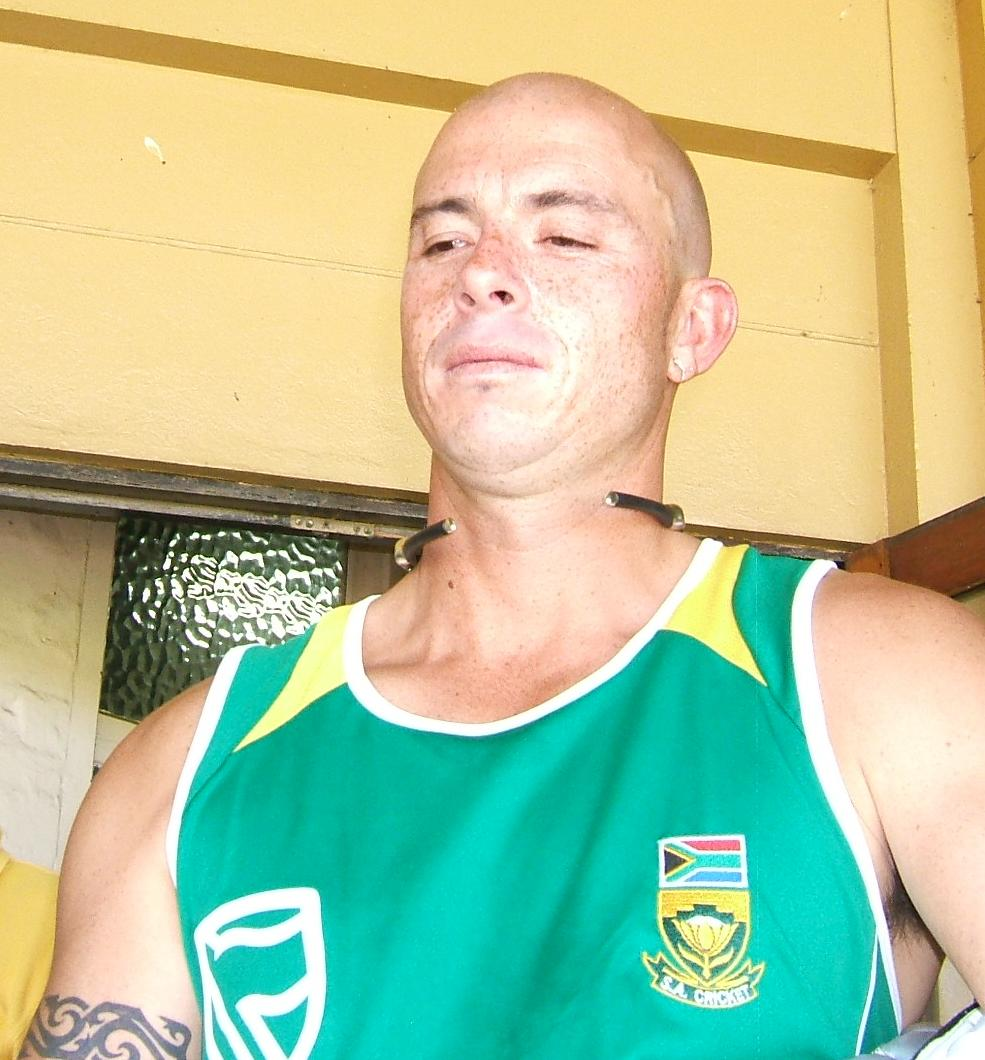
Herschelle Gibbs, the Player of the Match of the first ever game where a team scored 400.

This is a list of scores of 400 or more runs made by a team in a One Day International (ODI), a form of one-day cricket played between international cricket teams who are Full Members of the International Cricket Council (ICC) as well as the top six Associate and Affiliate members. Unlike Test matches, ODIs consist of one innings per side, with a limit on the number of overs. The limit is currently 50 overs per innings, although in the past this has varied. The earliest match now recognised as an ODI was played between England and Australia on 5 January 1971; since then there have been over 4,000 ODIs played between 26 teams.

Team totals have risen steadily throughout the history of ODIs. This has accelerated in recent years, with improvements in techniques, new playing methods and introduction of Twenty20 International cricket. The highest team total before 400 runs was reached was the 398/5 scored by Sri Lanka against Kenya on 6 March 1996 at Asgiriya Stadium, Kandy.

The 400 marks were first broken during a notable match between South Africa and Australia, with both teams passing 400 runs in their respective innings. As batting powerplays and other fielding restrictions have come into play, 400+ totals have become more common. Eight international teams have scored 400+ totals in their matches. India have recorded more 400+ scores in ODIs than any other nation, with nine such scores as of September 2026. There have been four occurrences where both teams in a match have scored more than 400 in their respective innings, with the first one being the Australia and South Africa match in 2006, the second one being India and Sri Lanka in 2009, the third one being West Indies and India in 2026, and the fourth one being England and Sri Lanka in 2026.

As of October 2026, there have been 37 occasions where a team has recorded a 400+ total.

The highest score in ODIs was achieved by England, who scored 498/4 in 50 overs against Netherlands at VRA Cricket Ground on 17 June 2022.

== Listing notation ==
Team notation

- (300/3) indicates that a team scored 300 runs for three wickets and the innings was closed, either due to a successful run chase or if no overs remained (or are able) to be bowled.
- (300) indicates that a team scored 300 runs and was all out, either by losing all ten wickets or by having one or more batsmen unable to bat and losing the remaining wickets.

Batting notation

- (100*) indicates that a batsman scored 100 runs and was not out.
- (175) indicates that a batsman scored 175 runs and was out after that, like Herschelle Gibbs against Australia

Bowling notation

- (5/40) indicates that a bowler has captured 5 wickets while giving away 40 runs.
- (49.5 overs) indicates that a team bowled 49 complete overs (each of six legal deliveries), and one incomplete over of just five deliveries.

== List in chronological order ==
| No. | Score | Team | Opponent | Venue | Season |
|---|---|---|---|---|---|
| 1 | 434/4 (50 overs) | Australia | South Africa | Johannesburg | 2005–06 |
| 2 | 438/9 (49.5 overs) | South Africa | Australia | Johannesburg | 2005–06 |
| 3 | 443/9 (50 overs) | Sri Lanka | Netherlands | Amstelveen | 2006 |
| 4 | 413/5 (50 overs) | India | Bermuda | Port of Spain | 2007 |
| 5 | 402/2 (50 overs) | New Zealand | Ireland | Aberdeen, Scotland | 2008 |
| 6 | 414/7 (50 overs) | India | Sri Lanka | Rajkot | 2009–10 |
| 7 | 411/8 (50 overs) | Sri Lanka | India | Rajkot | 2009–10 |
| 8 | 401/3 (50 overs) | India | South Africa | Gwalior | 2009–10 |
| 9 | 418/5 (50 overs) | India | West Indies | Indore | 2011–12 |
| 10 | 404/5 (50 overs) | India | Sri Lanka | Kolkata | 2014–15 |
| 11 | 439/2 (50 overs) | South Africa | West Indies | Johannesburg | 2014–15 |
| 12 | 408/5 (50 overs) | South Africa | West Indies | Sydney | 2014–15 |
| 13 | 411/4 (50 overs) | South Africa | Ireland | Canberra | 2014–15 |
| 14 | 417/6 (50 overs) | Australia | Afghanistan | Perth | 2014–15 |
| 15 | 408/9 (50 overs) | England | New Zealand | Birmingham | 2015 |
| 16 | 438/4 (50 overs) | South Africa | India | Mumbai | 2015–16 |
| 17 | 444/3 (50 overs) | England | Pakistan | Nottingham | 2016 |
| 18 | 481/6 (50 overs) | England | Australia | Nottingham | 2018 |
| 19 | 418/6 (50 overs) | England | West Indies | St George's | 2018–19 |
| 20 | 498/4 (50 overs) | England | Netherlands | Amstelveen | 2022 |
| 21 | 409/8 (50 overs) | India | Bangladesh | Chittagong | 2022–2023 |
| 22 | 408/6 (50 overs) | Zimbabwe | United States | Harare | 2023 |
| 23 | 416/5 (50 overs) | South Africa | Australia | Centurion | 2023 |
| 24 | 428/5 (50 overs) | South Africa | Sri Lanka | Delhi | 2023 |
| 25 | 401/6 (50 overs) | New Zealand | Pakistan | Bengaluru | 2023 |
| 26 | 410/4 (50 overs) | India | Netherlands | Bengaluru | 2023 |
| 27 | 400/8 (50 overs) | England | West Indies | Birmingham | 2025 |
| 28 | 431/2 (50 overs) | Australia | South Africa | Mackay | 2025 |
| 29 | 414/5 (50 overs) | England | South Africa | Southampton | 2025 |
| 30 | 402 (49.4 overs) | India | Afghanistan | Lucknow | 2026 |
| 31 | 405/7 (50 overs) | West Indies | India | Guwahati | 2026–27 |
| 32 | 406/2 (43.3 overs) | India | West Indies | Guwahati | 2026–27 |
| 33 | 429/4 (50 overs) | England | Sri Lanka | Rawalpindi | 2026–27 |
| 34 | 430/8 (49.5 overs) | Sri Lanka | England | Rawalpindi | 2026–27 |
As of 22 October 2026; Source: CricInfo

=== By teams ===
| No | Team | No. of 400+ scores | Won | Lost | NR |
|---|---|---|---|---|---|
| 1 | India | 9 | 9 | 0 | 0 |
| 2 | South Africa | 8 | 8 | 0 | 0 |
| 2 | England | 8 | 7 | 1 | 0 |
| 4 | Australia | 3 | 2 | 1 | 0 |
| 4 | Sri Lanka | 3 | 2 | 1 | 0 |
| 5 | New Zealand | 2 | 1 | 1 | 0 |
| 7 | Zimbabwe | 1 | 1 | 0 | 0 |
| 7 | West Indies | 1 | 0 | 1 | 0 |
Last Updated: 22 October 2026

== Match summary of the 400+ totals ==
=== 1st & 2nd 400+ scores ===
March 12, 2006
Scorecard

| Australia; 434/4 (50 overs) | v | South Africa; 438/9 (49.5 overs) |
| Ricky Ponting 164 (105); Roger Telemachus 2/87 (10 overs) | | Herschelle Gibbs 175 (111); Nathan Bracken 5/67 (10 overs) |

South Africa won by 1 wicket
New Wanderers Stadium, Johannesburg
Umpires: Aleem Dar (Pakistan) and Brian Jerling (South Africa)
Player of the match: Herschelle Gibbs (RSA)

- Australia won the toss and chose to bat
- Australia scored the first ever team total over 400 in men's cricket in ODIs.
- Australia scored the highest ever team total in ODIs (434); surpassing Sri Lanka's total of 398 in 1996; before South Africa surpassed it in the same match (438). [Later Surpassed]
- South Africa chasing 434 was the highest successful ODI chase of all time and the highest team total in the second innings in ODIs.
- This match recorded the highest aggregate runs in a match: (872), surpassing the previous record of 693 set by India and Pakistan in 2004.
- This match recorded the most sixes hit in a match in ODIs (26) and the most fours hit in a match in ODIs (89). [Later Surpassed]
- Ricky Ponting (AUS) scored the fastest 150 in ODIs, reaching this target in 99 balls. [Later Surpassed]
- Mick Lewis conceded the most runs in an innings in ODIs (113). He also became the first bowler to concede 100 runs in a fifty-over ODI match. [Later Surpassed]

=== 3rd 400+ score ===
4 July 2006
Scorecard

| Sri Lanka; 443/9 (50 overs) | v | Netherlands; 248 (48.3 overs) |
| Sanath Jayasuriya 157 (104); Billy Stelling 2/77 (10 overs) | | Tim de Leede 51 (42); Kaushal Lokuarachchi 3/41 (9.3 overs) |

Sri Lanka won by 195 runs
VRA Cricket Ground, Amstelveen
Umpires: Steve Bucknor (West Indies) and Shahul Hameed (Indonesia)
Player of the match: Sanath Jayasuriya (SRL)

- Sri Lanka won the toss and chose to bat.
- Sri Lanka scored the highest ever team total in ODIs (443). [Later Surpassed]

=== 4th 400+ score ===
20 September 2006
Scorecard

| South Africa; 418/5 (50 overs) | v | Zimbabwe; 247/4 (50 overs) |
| Mark Boucher 147* (68); Tafadzwa Kamungozi 2/70 (10 overs) | | Terry Duffin 88 (134); Roger Telemachus 2/33 (8 overs) |

South Africa won by 171 runs
Sedgars Park, Potchefstroom
Umpires: Daryl Harper (Aus) and Brian Jerling (RSA)
Player of the match: Mark Boucher (RSA)

- South Africa won the toss and chose to bat.

=== 5th 400+ score ===
19 March 2007
Scorecard

| India; 413/5 (50 overs) | v | Bermuda; 156 (43.1 overs) |
| Virender Sehwag 114 (87); Delyone Borden 2/30 (5 overs) | | David Hemp 76 (105); Anil Kumble 3/38 (9.1 overs) |

India won by 257 runs
Queens Park Oval, Port of Spain
Umpires: Aleem Dar (Pak) and Ian Howell (RSA)
Player of the match: Virender Sehwag (Ind)

- Bermuda won the toss and chose to field
- This was the first instance of a team registering 400+ score in a Cricket World Cup match.
- India scored the highest ever team total in the Cricket World Cup (413). [Later Surpassed]

=== 6th 400+ score ===
1 July 2008
Scorecard

| New Zealand; 402/2 (50 overs) | v | Ireland; 112 (28.3 overs) |
| Brendon McCullum 166 (135); Phil Eaglestone 1/60 (7 overs) | | Peter Connell 22* (26); Tim Southee 3/23 (6 overs) |

New Zealand won by 290 runs
Mannofield Park, Aberdeen, Scotland
Umpires: Paul Baldwin (GER) & Steve Davis (AUS)
Player of the match: Brendon McCullum (Nzl)

- Ireland won the toss and chose to field.
- New Zealand's victory set a new world record for the biggest margin of victory by runs. [Later Surpassed]

=== 7th & 8th 400+ scores ===
15 December 2009
Scorecard

| India; 414/7 (50 overs) | v | Sri Lanka; 411/8 (50 overs) |
| Virender Sehwag 146 (102); Chanaka Welegedara 2/63 (10 overs) | | Tillakaratne Dilshan 160 (124); Harbhajan Singh 2/58 (10 overs) |

India won by 3 runs
Madhavrao Scindia Cricket Ground, Rajkot
Umpires: Marais Erasmus (SA) & Shavir Tarapore (Ind)
Player of the match: Virender Sehwag (Ind)

- Sri Lanka won the toss and elected to field.
- This match was only the second occasion where both teams put up totals in excess of 400.

=== 9th 400+ score ===
24 February 2010
D/N
Scorecard

| India; 401/3 (50 overs) | v | South Africa; 248 (42.5 overs) |
| Sachin Tendulkar 200* (147); Wayne Parnell 2/95 (10 overs) | | AB de Villiers 114* (101); Sreesanth 3/49 (7 overs) |

India won by 153 runs
Captain Roop Singh Stadium, Gwalior
Umpires: Ian Gould (Eng) and Shavir Tarapore (Ind)
Player of the match: Sachin Tendulkar (Ind)

- India won the toss and elected to bat first.
- Sachin Tendulkar became the first batsman to score a double century in ODIs.

=== 10th 400+ score ===
8 December 2011
14:30 (D/N)
Scorecard

| India; 418/5 (50 overs) | v | West Indies; 265 (49.2 overs) |
| Virender Sehwag 219 (149); Andre Russell 1/63 (7 overs) | | Denesh Ramdin 96 (96); Ravindra Jadeja 3/34 (10 overs) |

India won by 153 runs
Holkar Cricket Stadium, Indore
Umpires: Tony Hill (NZ) and S Ravi (Ind)
Player of the match: Virender Sehwag (Ind)

- India won the toss and elected to bat
- Virender Sehwag scored the then highest individual score in ODIs, breaking that of Sachin Tendulkar's.

=== 11th 400+ score ===
13 November 2014
02:30 PM
Scorecard

| India; 404/5 (50 overs) | v | Sri Lanka; 251 (43.1 overs) |
| Rohit Sharma 264 (173); Angelo Mathews 2/44 (8 overs) | | Angelo Mathews 75 (68); Dhawal Kulkarni 4/34 (10 overs) |

India won by 153 runs.
Eden Gardens, Kolkata, West Bengal
Attendance: 50,389
Umpires: Bruce Oxenford (Aus) and S. Ravi (Ind)
Player of the match: Rohit Sharma (Ind)

- India won the toss and elected to bat.
- Rohit Sharma scored the highest individual score in ODIs (264), breaking that of Virender Sehwag's.

=== 12th 400+ score ===
18 January 2015
Scorecard

| South Africa; 439/2 (50 overs) | v | West Indies; 291/7 (50 overs) |
| Hashim Amla 153* (142); Andre Russell 1/78 (10 overs) | | Denesh Ramdin 57 (55); Morne Morkel 2/43 (10 overs) |

South Africa won by 148 runs
New Wanderers Stadium, Johannesburg
Umpires: Steve Davis (Aus) and Adrian Holdstock (SA)
Player of the match: AB De Villiers (SA)

- West Indies won the toss and elected to field.
- South Africa registered their highest ODI score.
- AB de Villiers scored the fastest ODI 50 in 16 balls and fastest ODI 100 in 31 balls as well as equaled Rohit Sharma and Chris Gayle's record tally of 16 sixes in an ODI. (later surprassed)

=== 13th 400+ score ===
27 February 2015 (D/N)
Scorecard

| South Africa; 408/5 (50 overs) | v | West Indies; 151 (33.1 overs) |
| AB de Villiers 162* (66); Chris Gayle 2/21 (4 overs) | | Jason Holder 56 (48); Imran Tahir 5/45 (10 overs) |

South Africa won by 257 runs
Sydney Cricket Ground, Sydney
Umpires: Steve Davis (Aus) and Ian Gould (Eng)
Player of the match: AB de Villiers (SA)

- South Africa won the toss and elected to bat.
- AB de Villiers scored the fastest 150 ever in ODI cricket in 63 balls.

=== 14th 400+ score ===
3 March 2015 (D/N)
Scorecard

| South Africa; 411/4 (50 overs) | v | Ireland; 210 (45 overs) |
| Hashim Amla 159 (128); Andrew McBrine 2/63 (10 overs) | | Andrew Balbirnie 58 (71); Kyle Abbott 4/21 (8 overs) |

South Africa won by 201 runs
Manuka Oval, Canberra
Umpires: Steve Davis (Aus) and Ranmore Martinesz (SRL)
Player of the match: Hashim Amla (SA)

- South Africa won the toss and elected to bat.
- South Africa became the first team to score 400 in two consecutive ODI innings.

=== 15th 400+ score ===
4 March 2015 (D/N)
Scorecard

| Australia; 417/6 (50 overs) | v | Afghanistan; 142 (37.3 overs) |
| David Warner 178 (133); Shapoor Zadran 2/89 (10 overs) | | Nawroz Mangal 33 (35); Mitchell Johnson 4/22 (7.3 overs) |

Australia won by 275 runs
WACA Ground, Perth
Umpires: Kumar Dharmasena (SL) and Michael Gough (Eng)
Player of the match: David Warner (Aus)

- Afghanistan won the toss and elected to field.
- Australia's score of 417/6 is the highest in men's ODI World Cup history, bettering India's 413/5 in the 2007 World Cup. The winning margin of 275 runs was the highest in a World Cup match (later surpassed).

=== 16th 400+ score ===
9 June 2015
14:00 (D/N)
Scorecard

| England; 408/9 (50 overs) | v | New Zealand; 198 (31.1 overs) |
| Jos Buttler 129 (77); Trent Boult 4/55 (10 overs) | | Ross Taylor 57 (54); Steven Finn 4/35 (7 overs) |

England won by 210 runs
Edgbaston, Birmingham
Umpires: Michael Gough (Eng) and Bruce Oxenford (Aus)
Player of the match: Jos Buttler (Eng)

- New Zealand won the toss and elected to field.

=== 17th 400+ score ===
25 October 2015
14:00 (D/N)
Scorecard

| South Africa; 438/4 (50 overs) | v | India; 224 (35.5 overs) |
| Faf du Plessis 133 (115); Suresh Raina 1/19 (3 overs) | | Ajinkya Rahane 87 (51); Kagiso Rabada 4/41 (6.5 overs) |

South Africa won by 214 runs
Wankhede Stadium, Mumbai
Umpires: Anil Chaudhary (Ind) and Kumar Dharmasena (SL)
Player of the match: Quinton de Kock (SA)

- South Africa won the toss and elected to bat.

=== 18th 400+ score ===
30 August 2016
14:00 (D/N)
Scorecard

| England; 444/3 (50 overs) | v | Pakistan; 275 (42.4 overs) |
| Alex Hales 171 (122); Hasan Ali 2/74 (10 overs) | | Mohammad Amir 58 (27); Chris Woakes 4/41 (5.4 overs) |

England won by 169 runs
Trent Bridge, Nottingham
Umpires: Simon Fry (AUS) and Richard Kettleborough (ENG)
Player of the match: Alex Hales (ENG)

- England won the toss and elected to bat.
- England set the then record for the highest team score, bettering Sri Lanka's score of 443/9, posted back in 2006.

=== 19th 400+ score ===
19 June 2018
14:00 (D/N)
Scorecard

| England; 481/6 (50 overs) | v | Australia; 239 (37 overs) |
| Alex Hales 147 (92); Jhye Richardson 3/92 (10 overs) | | Travis Head 51 (39); Adil Rashid 4/47 (10 overs) |

England won by 242 runs
Trent Bridge, Nottingham
Umpires: Kumar Dharmasena (SL) and Tim Robinson (Eng)
Player of the match: Alex Hales (Eng)

- Australia won the toss and elected to field.
- England set a new record for the highest innings total in ODIs. This was also the first instance where a men's team scored more than 450 runs in an ODI.

=== 20th 400+ score ===
27 February 2019
09:30
Scorecard

| England; 418/6 (50 overs) | v | West Indies; 389 (48 overs) |
| Jos Buttler 150 (77); Carlos Brathwaite 2/69 (10 overs) | | Chris Gayle 162 (97); Adil Rashid 5/85 (10 overs) |

England won by 29 runs
National Cricket Stadium, Grenada
Umpires: Gregory Brathwaite (WI) and Bruce Oxenford (Aus)
Player of the match: Jos Buttler (Eng)

- West Indies won the toss and elected to field.
- This was the 100th ODI played between the West Indies and England.
- Eoin Morgan became the first batsman to score 6,000 runs for England in ODIs.
- Jos Buttler (Eng) scored the fastest century in the West Indies in ODIs (60 balls), and scored the most sixes in an ODI inning for England (12). Chris Gayle (WI) then surpassed Buttler's record by taking 55 balls to complete his century.
- England hit 24 sixes in their innings, breaking the previous record of 23, set by the West Indies in the first ODI.
- This was England's highest total against the West Indies in ODIs.
- Chris Gayle (WI) scored his 10,000th run and his 25th century in ODIs. Gayle also scored his 500th six in international cricket.
- 46 sixes were hit in the match, a record in ODIs.
- This was the West Indies' highest total in ODIs.

=== 21st 400+ score ===
17 June 2022
11:00
Scorecard

| England; 498/4 (50 overs) | v | Netherlands; 266 (49.4 overs) |
| Jos Buttler 162* (70); Pieter Seelaar 2/83 (9 overs) | | Scott Edwards 72* (56); Moeen Ali 3/57 (10 overs) |

England won by 232 runs
VRA Cricket Ground, Amstelveen
Umpires: Rizwan Akram (Ned) and Paul Reiffel (Aus)
Player of the match: Jos Buttler (Eng)

- Netherlands won the toss and elected to field.
- Phil Salt (Eng) scored his first century in ODIs.
- Dawid Malan (Eng) scored his first century in ODIs.
- Jos Buttler (Eng) scored his 10th century in ODIs.
- England's total of 498 set a new record for the highest total in an ODI match, beating the previous record of 481 that they set against Australia at Trent Bridge in 2018.
- England's total of 498 set a new record for the highest total in a List A match (later surpassed)

=== 22nd 400+ score ===
10 December 2022
12:00 (D/N)
Scorecard

| India; 409/8 (50 overs) | v | Bangladesh; 182 (34 overs) |
| Ishan Kishan 210 (131); Shakib Al Hasan 2/68 (10 overs) | | Shakib Al Hasan 43 (50); Shardul Thakur 3/30 (5 overs) |

India won by 227 runs
Zohur Ahmed Chowdhury Stadium, Chittagong
Umpires: Michael Gough (Eng) and Gazi Sohel (Ban)
Player of the match: Ishan Kishan (Ind)

- Bangladesh won the toss and elected to field.
- Ishan Kishan (Ind) scored his maiden and also the fastest ODI double-hundred off 126 balls.
- Virat Kohli (Ind) scored his 44th century in ODIs. He also scored his 72nd century in international cricket, and surpassed Ricky Ponting's record of the second-most centuries scored across formats in international cricket.

=== 23rd 400+ score ===
26 June 2023
9:00
Scorecard

| Zimbabwe; 408/6 (50 overs) | v | United States; 104 (25.1 overs) |
| Sean Williams 174 (101); Abhishek Paradkar 3/78 (9 overs) | | Abhishek Paradkar 24 (31); Sikandar Raza 2/15 (5 overs) |

Zimbabwe won by 304 runs
Harare Sports Club, Harare
Umpires: Sam Nogajski (Aus) and Martin Saggers (Eng)
Player of the match: Sean Williams (Zim)

- United States won the toss and elected to field.
- This was Zimbabwe's first 400+ score in ODIs, making them the seventh team overall to manage this.
- This was Zimbabwe's highest margin of victory in ODI cricket.
- This was the second highest margin of victory in ODI cricket.

=== 24th 400+ score ===
15 September 2023
13:00 (D/N)
Scorecard

| South Africa; 416/5 (50 overs) | v | Australia; 252 (34.5 overs) |
| Heinrich Klaasen 174 (83); Josh Hazlewood 2/79 (10 overs) | | Alex Carey 99 (77); Lungi Ngidi 4/51 (8 overs) |

South Africa won by 164 runs
Centurion Park, Centurion
Umpires: Nitin Menon (Ind) and Allahudien Paleker (SA)
Player of the match: Heinrich Klaasen (SA)

- Australia won the toss and elected to field.
- Adam Zampa (Aus) equalled the record for most runs conceded in an ODI (113).

=== 25th 400+ score ===
7 October 2023
14:00 (D/N)
Scorecard

| South Africa; 428/5 (50 overs) | v | Sri Lanka; 326 (44.5 overs) |
| Rassie van der Dussen 108 (110); Dilshan Madushanka 2/86 (10 overs) | | Charith Asalanka 79 (65); Gerald Coetzee 3/68 (9 overs) |

South Africa won by 102 runs
Arun Jaitley Stadium, Delhi
Umpires: Richard Illingworth (Eng) and Sharfuddoula (Ban)
Player of the match: Aiden Markram (SA)

- Sri Lanka won the toss and elected to field.
- South Africa's score of 428/5 is the highest in World Cup history.
- Aiden Markram (SA) scored the fastest century in World Cup history (49 balls).
- The 754 runs scored in the fixture is the second highest match aggregate in a World Cup match.

=== 26th 400+ score ===
4 November 2023
10:30
Scorecard

| New Zealand; 401/6 (50 overs) | v | Pakistan; 200/1 (25.3 overs) |
| Rachin Ravindra 108 (94); Mohammad Wasim Jr. 3/60 (10 overs) | | Fakhar Zaman 126* (81); Tim Southee 1/27 (5 overs) |

Pakistan won by 21 runs (DLS method)
M. Chinnaswamy Stadium, Bangalore
Umpires: Richard Kettleborough (Eng) and Paul Wilson (Aus)
Player of the match: Fakhar Zaman (Pak)

- Pakistan won the toss and elected to field.
- No further play was possible due to rain.

=== 27th 400+ score ===
12 November 2023
14:00 (D/N)
Scorecard

| India; 410/4 (50 overs) | v | Netherlands; 250 (47.5 overs) |
| Shreyas Iyer 128* (94); Bas de Leede 2/82 (10 overs) | | Teja Nidamanuru 54 (39); Mohammed Siraj 2/29 (6 overs) |

India won by 160 runs
M. Chinnaswamy Stadium, Bangalore
Umpires: Chris Gaffaney (NZ) and Michael Gough (Eng)
Player of the match: Shreyas Iyer (Ind)

- India won the toss and elected to bat.
- Rohit Sharma (Ind) broke AB de Villiers' 2015 record for the most sixes in ODIs in a year (60).
- KL Rahul broke Rohit Sharma's record for the fastest century by an India cricketer in World Cups, in terms of balls faced (62).
- Shreyas Iyer and KL Rahul scored the highest ever partnership on the 4th wicket at the Cricket World Cup. They also scored the 4th highest partnership ever for India at the Cricket World Cup.

=== 28th 400+ score ===
29 May 2025
13:00 (D/N)
Scorecard

| England; 400/8 (50 overs) | v | West Indies; 162 (26.2 overs) |
| Jacob Bethell 82 (53); Jayden Seales 4/84 (9 overs) | | Jayden Seales 29* (14); Jamie Overton 3/22 (5.2 overs) |

England won by 238 runs
Edgbaston, Birmingham
Umpires: Kumar Dharmasena (SL) and Martin Saggers (Eng)
Player of the match: Jacob Bethell (Eng)

- West Indies won the toss and elected to field.
- It was the first time that seven different batters (Eng) scored 30-plus in an ODI innings. It also became the first ODI where a team had reached 400 without a single batter scoring a century.
- Harry Brook (Eng) equalled Jonty Rhodes' record for most catches by a fielder in an innings (5) in ODIs.

=== 29th 400+ score ===
24 August 2025
14:30 (D/N)
Scorecard

| Australia; 431/2 (50 overs) | v | South Africa; 155 (24.5 overs) |
| Travis Head 142 (103); Keshav Maharaj 1/57 (10 overs) | | Dewald Brevis 49 (28); Cooper Connolly 5/22 (6 overs) |

Australia won by 276 runs
Great Barrier Reef Arena, Mackay
Umpires: Chris Gaffaney (NZ) and Sam Nogajski (Aus)
Player of the match: Travis Head (Aus)

- Australia won the toss and elected to bat.
- Cameron Green (Aus) scored his maiden century in ODIs.
- Cooper Connolly (Aus) took his first five-wicket haul in ODIs.
- This was South Africa's biggest loss in terms of runs.

=== 30th 400+ score ===
7 September 2025
11:00
Scorecard

| England; 414/5 (50 overs) | v | South Africa; 72 (20.5 overs) |
| Jacob Bethell 110 (82); Keshav Maharaj 2/61 (8 overs) | | Corbin Bosch 20 (32); Jofra Archer 4/18 (9 overs) |

England won by 342 runs
Rose Bowl, Southampton
Umpires: Nitin Menon (Ind) and Russell Warren (Eng)
Player of the match: Jofra Archer (Eng)

- South Africa won the toss and elected to field.
- Codi Yusuf (SA) made his ODI debut.
- Jacob Bethell (Eng) scored his maiden century in ODIs.
- This was England's highest total against South Africa in ODIs.
- This was the biggest winning margin in terms of runs by any team in ODI history.

=== 31st 400+ score ===
17 June 2026
13:30 (D/N)
Scorecard

| India; 402 (49.5 overs) | v | Afghanistan; 232 (44.3 overs) |
| Shubman Gill 154 (110); Nangialai Kharoti 4/76 (10 overs) | | Rahmat Shah 79 (89); Arshdeep Singh 3/45 (9 overs) |

India won by 170 runs
Ekana Cricket Stadium, Lucknow
Umpires: Richard Illingworth (Eng) and Virender Sharma (Ind)
Player of the match: Shubman Gill (Ind)

- Afghanistan won the toss and elected to field.
- Prince Yadav (Ind) and Darwish Rasooli (Afg) both made their ODI debuts.
- Ishan Kishan (Ind) scored his 1,000th run in ODIs.

=== 32nd & 33rd 400+ scores ===
30 September 2026
14:00 (D/N)
Scorecard

| West Indies; 405/7 (50 overs) | v | India; 406/2 (43.3 overs) |
| Amir Jangoo 114 (77); Kuldeep Yadav 2/65 (10 overs) | | Shubman Gill 223* (133); Shamar Joseph 1/52 (6 overs) |

India won by 8 wickets
Assam Cricket Association Stadium, Guwahati
Umpires: Sharfuddoula (Ban) and Virender Sharma (Ind)
Player of the match: Shubman Gill (Ind)

- India won the toss and elected to field.
- Auqib Nabi (Ind) made his ODI debut.
- KL Rahul (Ind) played in his 100th ODI match.
- Kuldeep Yadav (Ind) took his 200th wicket in ODIs.
- West Indies registered their highest ever total in ODIs.
- Rohit Sharma (Ind) scored his 12,000th run in ODIs. He also became the first batsman to hit 200 sixes in a single country.
- Shubman Gill (Ind) became the second batsman after Rohit Sharma to score two double-centuries in ODIs.
- Gill's double century was the fastest in terms of balls faced (117) in ODIs. He also made the highest individual score by a captain in ODIs. It was also the first time that an Indian batsman scored double century while chasing.
- 5 centuries were scored in this match, the highest in any ODI match.
- This was India's highest successful run-chase in the history of ODIs. This was also the second highest successful run-chase in the history of ODIs.

=== 34th & 35th 400+ scores ===
22 October 2026
13:00 (D/N)
Scorecard

| England; 429/4 (50 overs) | v | Sri Lanka; 430/8 (49.5 overs) |
| Harry Brook 202 (116); Dunith Wellalage 2/56 (10 overs) | | Pavan Rathnayake 130 (106); Josh Tongue 3/79 (8.5 overs) |

Sri Lanka won by 2 wickets
Rawalpindi Cricket Stadium, Rawalpindi
Umpires: Wayne Knights (NZ) and Asif Yaqoob (Pak)
Player of the match: Pavan Rathnayake (SL)

- Sri Lanka won the toss and elected to field.
- Joe Root (Eng) scored his 8,000th run in ODIs.
- Harry Brook (Eng) scored his maiden double century in ODIs.
- This was Sri Lanka's highest successful run-chase in ODIs.
