= Fifth ODI, Australian cricket team in South Africa in 2005–06 =

Cricket match

Fifth ODI, South Africa vs Australia
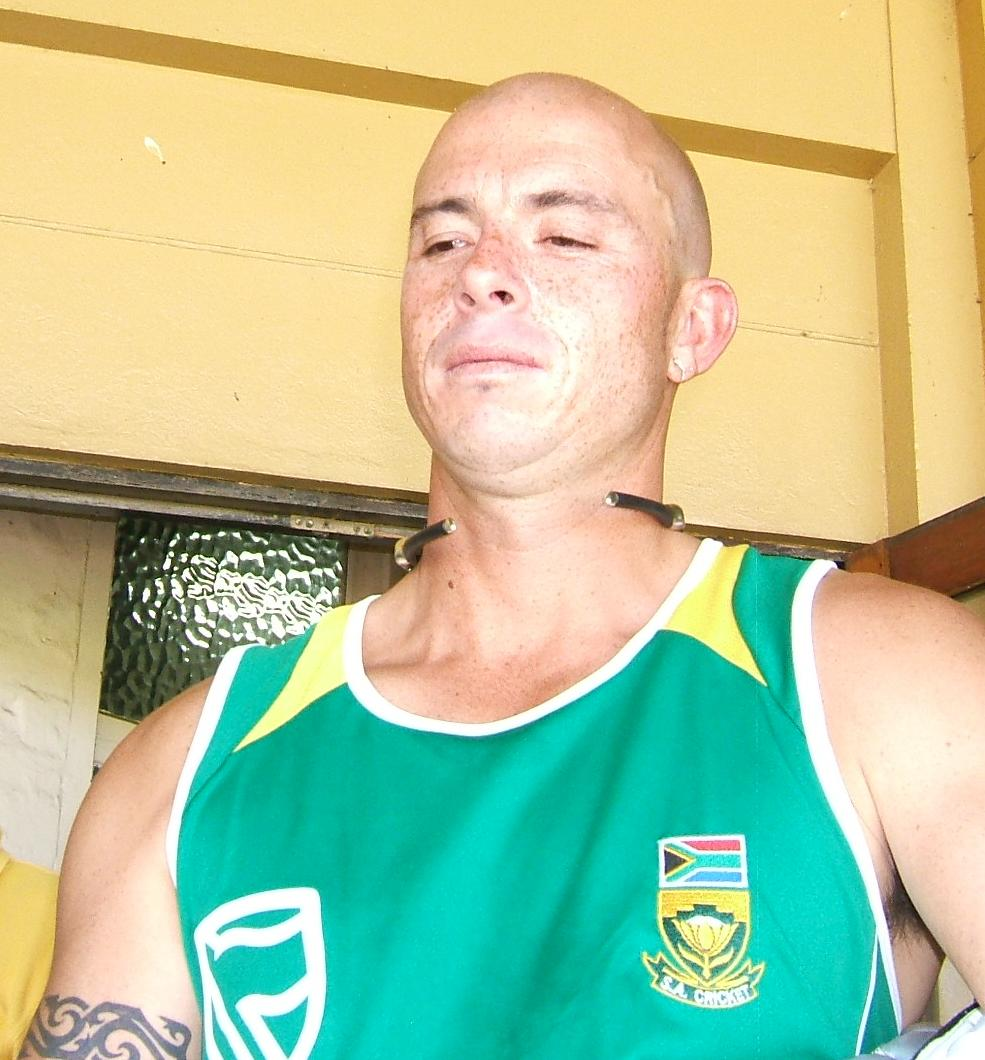
- Herschelle Gibbs, the Player of the Match of the 438 Game
- Event: Australian tour of South Africa, 2005–06
Australia	South Africa
(Australia)	(South Africa)
434/4	438/9
50 overs	49.5 overs
- Date: 12 March 2006
- Venue: New Wanderers Stadium, Johannesburg, Gauteng
- Player of the match: Herschelle Gibbs & Ricky Ponting
- Umpires: Aleem Dar and Brian Jerling

The 5th One Day International cricket match between South Africa and Australia, also referred to as the 438 Match or 438 Game was played on 12 March 2006 at New Wanderers Stadium, Johannesburg. The match broke many cricket records, including both the first and the second team innings score of over 400 runs. Australia won the toss and elected to bat first. They scored 434 for 4 off their 50 overs, breaking the previous record of 398–5 by Sri Lanka against Kenya in 1996. In reply, South Africa scored 438–9, winning by one wicket with one ball to spare. The match has been acclaimed as the greatest One Day International match ever played.

== Background ==
For some years, there had been an intense rivalry between Australia and South Africa in One-Day Internationals, dating from the semi-final of the 1999 Cricket World Cup, where South Africa could only tie against Australia in a match they needed to win to progress to the final. Some followers of cricket considered that to be the greatest game of all time. Earlier in the 2005–06 season, South Africa toured Australia, where they failed to reach the final of the three-team one-day series, including losing three of their four matches against Australia. They also lost the three Test series 2–0. It was also of constant irritation to the South Africans that the Australians were referring to them as "chokers".

This match was the final match of a five-match series in South Africa. South Africa won the first two matches comfortably, but Australia fought back to win the next two, making this the deciding match. Australia had to play the series without their best one-day bowler, Glenn McGrath, whose wife was suffering from cancer. The South African team also missed their best one-day bowler, Shaun Pollock, in the final match due to a back strain.

== The Match ==
=== Summary ===
March 12 2006
Scorecard

Australia; 434/4 (50 overs)	v	South Africa; 438/9 (49.5 overs)
Ricky Ponting 164 (105); Roger Telemachus 2/87 (10 overs)		Herschelle Gibbs 175 (111); Nathan Bracken 5/67 (10 overs)

South Africa won by 1 wicket
Johannesburg
Umpires: Aleem Dar (Pakistan) and Brian Jerling (South Africa)
Player of the match: Herschelle Gibbs (RSA) and Ricky Ponting (Aus)

- Australia won the toss and chose to bat
- Australia scored the first ever team total over 400 in men's cricket in ODIs.
- Australia scored the highest ever team total in ODIs (434); surpassing Sri Lanka's total of 398 in 1996; before South Africa surpassed it in the same match (438). [Later surpassed]
- South Africa chasing 434 was the highest successful ODI chase of all time and the highest team total in the second innings in ODIs.
- This match recorded the highest aggregate runs in a match: (872), surpassing the previous record of 693 set by India and Pakistan in 2004.
- This match recorded the most sixes hit in a match in ODIs (26) and the most fours hit in a match in ODIs (89). [Later surpassed]
- Ricky Ponting (AUS) scored the fastest 150 in ODIs, reaching this target in 99 balls. [Later surpassed]
- Mick Lewis (AUS) conceded the most runs in an innings in ODIs (113). He also became the first bowler to concede 100 runs in a fifty-over ODI match. [Later surpassed]

=== Description ===
Australian captain Ricky Ponting chose to bat after winning the toss. Adam Gilchrist and Simon Katich got the side off to a good start, both scoring fifties. A difficult catch by Andrew Hall diving to his left removed Gilchrist in the 16th over while the partnership was on 97. Ponting then scored his fastest century with 100 off 73 balls, and went on to his highest score at the Wanderers ground with 164 from 105 balls, including 9 sixes and 13 fours. Ponting and Katich put on 119 runs for the second wicket, before Katich was caught at third man by Roger Telemachus off Makhaya Ntini. Michael Hussey was promoted up the order and made 81. Ponting was dismissed after his drive shot was caught by Boeta Dippenaar in the 47th over. By the end of the innings, South Africa were under pressure with Telemachus beginning the 48th over with four consecutive no-balls. Australia made 53 runs off its last three overs; Andrew Symonds and Brett Lee helping the side past the world record with 27 and 9 runs respectively and Australia became the first side to ever score 400 runs in a One Day International.

News sites reported how Australia had just smashed the world record.

With the series at two all, South Africa went out batting, giving it their all, requiring 8.7 runs per over from the start. In the interval, Jacques Kallis had broken the ice in a sombre dressing-room with the words "Come on, guys: it's a 450-wicket. They're 15 short!" Such a chase had never been attempted before – at that point, the previous highest first innings score was Sri Lanka's 398 against Kenya. The previous highest second innings score was 344/8, scored by Pakistan against India at Karachi on 13 March 2004 (a game which India eventually won, by only five runs). The early loss of Boeta Dippenaar for 1 made the South African run chase seem more difficult. Herschelle Gibbs batted at number 3 and reached his 16th ODI hundred in 79 balls, beating his own South African record for the fastest score of a hundred that had previously been off 84 balls against Zimbabwe. Gibbs scored the second highest total by a South African with 175 off 111 balls. He and Graeme Smith had a 187 run partnership, bringing the South Africans back into the game. When Smith was out for 90, Gibbs shared another strong partnership, this time with AB de Villiers. Australia kept the pressure on after Gibbs' dismissal with consistent wickets, but big hitting by Johannes van der Wath and Mark Boucher kept the Proteas in the hunt. Nathan Bracken, in contrasting fashion to the rest of the match, bowled particularly well collecting 5 wickets and keeping his economy a respectable 6.7. By the final over of the match, South Africa needed 7 runs off 6 balls, with Boucher on strike. He pushed a single, giving the strike to Andrew Hall who hit a four, leaving 2 required off four balls. However, he was out caught attempting to repeat the shot, leaving the side at 433–9. Ntini, the number 11 batsman, managed to get the bowler, Brett Lee, away for a single to third man and tie the scores. Boucher then hit a four the next ball (getting his 19th fifty in ODI cricket), sealing South Africa's victory.

"Straight down the ground, what a victory! That is a sensational game of cricket, and it is a superb victory. Well, I've been around the world watching this game...look, there are tears, they are crying out there! The South Africans are charging out on to the field. Gilchrist shakes hands with Boucher. Ntini is on a high. Ponting cannot believe this has happened to his team. The South Africans at the Bullring today have seen the best one day international ever played."

— Tony Greig's commentary on the TV broadcast upon South Africa's victory

Both Ponting and Gibbs were awarded the Man of the Match, but Ponting declined it, saying that it belonged to Gibbs. Shaun Pollock was named Man of the Series, although he was resting for a back injury during this game.

== Scorecard ==
Australia innings
Batsman	Method of dismissal		Runs	Balls	4s	6s
A.C. Gilchrist	c Hall	b Telemachus	55	44	9	0
S. Katich	c Telemachus	b Ntini	79	90	9	1
R. Ponting(c)	c Dippenaar	b Telemachus	164	105	13	9
M. Hussey	c Ntini	b Hall	81	51	9	3
A. Symonds	not out		27	13	3	1
B. Lee	not out		9	7	0	0
Did not bat: D. R. Martyn, M. J. Clarke, N. W. Bracken, S. R. Clark, M. L. Lewis
Fall of wickets: 1–97 (Gilchrist, 15.2 ov), 2–216 (Katich, 30.3 ov), 3–374 (Hussey, 46.1 ov), 4–407 (Ponting, 47.4 ov)
Extras	(lb 4, w 5, nb 10)		19			
Total	(for 4 wickets, 50 overs)		434			

South Africa bowling statistics
Bowler	Overs	Maidens	Runs	Wickets
M. Ntini	9	0	80	1
A. J. Hall	10	0	80	1
J. J. van der Wath	10	0	76	0
R. Telemachus	10	1	87	2
G. C. Smith	4	0	29	0
J. H. Kallis	6	0	70	0
J. M. Kemp	1	0	8	0

South Africa innings
Batsman	Method of dismissal		Runs	Balls	4s	6s
G. C. Smith(c)	c Hussey	b Clarke	90	55	13	2
H. H. Dippenaar		b Bracken	1	7	0	0
H. H. Gibbs	c Lee	b Symonds	175	111	21	7
A. B. de Villiers	c Clarke	b Bracken	14	20	1	0
J. H. Kallis		c & b Symonds	20	21	1	0
M. V. Boucher(wk)	not out		50	43	4	0
J. M. Kemp	c Martyn	b Bracken	13	17	1	0
J. J. van der Wath	c Ponting	b Bracken	35	18	1	3
R. Telemachus	c Hussey	b Bracken	12	6	2	0
A. J. Hall	c Clarke	b Lee	7	4	1	0
M. Ntini	not out		1	1	0	0
Fall of wickets: 1–3 (Dippenaar, 1.2 ov), 2–190 (Smith, 22.1 ov), 3–284 (de Villiers, 30.5 ov), 4–299 (Gibbs, 31.5 ov), 5–327 (Kallis, 37.4 ov), 6–355 (Kemp, 42.1 ov), 7–399 (van der Wath, 46.3 ov), 8–423 (Telemachus, 48.2 ov), 9–433 (Hall, 49.3 ov)
Extras	(b 4, lb 8, w 4, nb 4)		20			
Total	(for 9 wickets, 49.5 overs)		438			

Australia bowling statistics
Bowler	Overs	Maidens	Runs	Wickets
B. Lee	7.5	0	68	1
N. W. Bracken	10	0	67	5
S. R. Clark	6	0	54	0
M. L. Lewis	10	0	113	0
A. Symonds	9	0	75	2
M. J. Clarke	7	0	49	1

== Records ==
=== Team ===
- Australia's score of 434/4 broke the record for highest total in an ODI, beating the previous record by 36. As of 2024, this is the eighth highest.
- South Africa's score of 438/9 also broke the record for a highest total in an ODI, and as of 2024 is the sixth highest.
- Highest successful run chase in an ODI: 438 runs. As of 2026, this record still stands.

=== Overall ===
- Highest aggregate runs in a match: 872, beating the previous record of 693 (India v Pakistan in 2004).
- Most sixes in a match: 26, later broken by New Zealand v India, March 2009 (31 sixes).
- Most fours in a match: 89.

=== Individual ===
- At the time of the match Herschelle Gibbs' innings was the tenth-highest individual score in ODI cricket, and the second-highest by a South African.
- Ponting set a new record for the fastest 150 in ODI cricket, reaching the total off 99 balls; Gibbs fell one ball short of matching this in the second innings. This record was then broken at least twice over the following years. The current record now belongs to South African AB De Villiers (150 runs off 64 balls) who scored 162 runs off 66 balls against the West Indies during the 2015 Cricket World Cup.
- Mick Lewis finished with bowling figures of 10–0–113–0 which (as of 18 February 2020) remains the most runs conceded in a single ODI match. He was the second bowler to concede 100 runs in an ODI, and the first to do so in a fifty over match (New Zealand's Martin Snedden had previously conceded 105 runs in a sixty over match).

== Reaction ==
The huge score led Steve Waugh to say that 500 in an innings is the next possibility. Others have said that scores like this are bad for the sport, with Barry Richards saying, "There is such a propensity for hitting boundaries that bowlers have been taken out of game".

Cricinfo's headline for the match was "South Africa win the greatest game", while The Sydney Morning Herald called the match "The greatest the world has seen"; The Advertiser called it the "Greatest of all time"; The Age "The best one dayer"; IAfrica called it "The greatest match ever" and IOL "the greatest match ever played."

The victory was also seen as redemption for the South Africans for the infamous 1999 World Cup semi-final, also against Australia. That match ended in a tie following a disastrous run-out in the final over involving Lance Klusener and Allan Donald and was called the "definitive one-day choke" by ESPNcricinfo.com. This victory buried the ghosts of 1999, and South Africa's "choker" tag was temporarily gone as in the ICC Champions Trophy 2013, the South Africans played the English in the first semi-final and the tag "chokers" was again used by the South African coach Gary Kirsten who admitted that the team "choked" that day.

== Aftermath ==
The Wanderers has since branded itself "home of the greatest ODI ever played". A few years after the match, they released limited edition T-shirts with the scorecard of the match printed on the front. There is a newly renovated "438 Bar", at the back of the Unity stand. Decorated with the wooden seats from the old open stand (it remains an open stand with new seating) and with "438" emblazoned onto the entrance, it is the most popular bar at the stadium, and a tribute to the legacy of the match.

== See also ==
- List of ODI records
- Australian cricket team in South Africa in 2005–06
