= 2005–06 VB Series =

Three-team One Day International men's cricket tournament held in Australia

- Part of the South African cricket team in Australia
- Date: 13 January 2006 – 14 February 2006
- Location: Australia
- Result: Australia (beat Sri Lanka 2–1 in the finals)
- Player of the series: Andrew Symonds
Teams
Australia	South Africa	Sri Lanka
Captains
RT Ponting	GC Smith	MS Atapattu
Most runs
Gilchrist (432) Katich (413) Symonds (389)	Dippenaar (382); Boucher (260); Gibbs (213)	Sangakkara (469); Jayawardene (425); Arnold (322)
Most wickets
Bracken (17) Lee (15) Hogg (11)	Hall (14); Pollock (11) van der Wath (10)	Muralitharan (16); Bandara (14); Perera (11)

The 2005–06 edition of the VB Series (so-called because of sponsor Victoria Bitter) was a three-team One Day International men's cricket tournament held in Australia in January and February 2006, between the hosting nation's team, South Africa and Sri Lanka. (Although all the matches were held in 2006, the convention is to refer to series using the name of the season, in this case the 2005–06 season). The teams played each other four with five points awarded for a win and a possible bonus point awarded either to the winners or losers depending on run rate. The top two teams on points went through to the best-of-three finals series. All matches were day-night matches except the final meeting between South Africa and Sri Lanka.

South Africa had already been touring Australia for a month, but did not win any of their four first-class matches, and lost the Test series 0–2. Before that, they had been playing 14 successive ODIs, with their last series being a 2–2 draw in India. Sri Lanka were touring New Zealand immediately before this series, completing a tour that should have been played in 2004–05 but was postponed because of the Asian tsunami; they lost three ODIs and won only one. Their last ODI series before that was a 1–6 loss in India. At the start of the series, they were seventh on the ICC ODI Championship table; South Africa were second, 17 points behind leaders Australia and 12 points ahead of Sri Lanka.

== Group stage table ==
VB Series after 12 matches
Pos	Team	Pld	W	NR/T	L	BP	Pts	NRR
1	Australia	8	6	0	2	3	27	+0.79
2	Sri Lanka	8	3	0	5	2	14	+0.03
3	South Africa	8	3	0	5	0	12	−0.08

== Schedule ==
No.	Date	Team 1	Team 2	Stadium	Location
Group stage schedule
1	13 January 2006	AUS	SL	Telstra Dome	Melbourne
2	15 January 2006	AUS	SA	The Gabba	Brisbane
3	17 January 2006	SL	SA	The Gabba	Brisbane
4	20 January 2006	AUS	SA	Telstra Dome	Melbourne
5	22 January 2006	AUS	SL	SCG	Sydney
6	24 January 2006	SL	SA	Adelaide Oval	Adelaide
7	26 January 2006	AUS	SL	Adelaide Oval	Adelaide
8	29 January 2006	AUS	SL	WACA Ground	Perth
9	31 January 2006	SL	SA	WACA Ground	Perth
10	3 February 2006	AUS	SA	Telstra Dome	Melbourne
11	5 February 2006	AUS	SA	SCG	Sydney
12	7 February 2006	SL	SA	Bellerive Oval	Hobart
Finals schedule
Final 1	10 February 2006	AUS	SL	Adelaide Oval	Adelaide
Final 2	12 February 2006	AUS	SL	SCG	Sydney
Final 3	14 February 2006	AUS	SL	The Gabba	Brisbane

== Squads ==
Australia
Name	Style	Domestic team
Ricky Ponting (c)	RHB, RM	Tasmania
Adam Gilchrist (wk)	LHB	Western Australia
Nathan Bracken	RHB, LF	New South Wales
Stuart Clark	RHB, RFM	New South Wales
Michael Clarke	RHB, SLA	New South Wales
Brett Dorey	RHB, RFM	Western Australia
Brad Haddin (wk)	RHB	New South Wales
Brad Hogg	LHB, SLC	Western Australia
James Hopes	RHB, RM	Queensland
Michael Hussey	LHB, RM	Western Australia
Simon Katich	LHB, SLC	New South Wales
Brett Lee	RHB, RF	New South Wales
Damien Martyn	RHB, RM	Western Australia
Glenn McGrath	RHB, RFM	New South Wales
Andrew Symonds	RHB, RM, OB	Queensland

South Africa
Name	Style	Domestic team
Graeme Smith	CPT, LHB, OB	Cape Cobras
Mark Boucher	WK, RHB	Warriors
Johan Botha	RHB, OB	Warriors
Boeta Dippenaar	RHB, OB	Eagles
Herschelle Gibbs	RHB, RFM	Cape Cobras
Andrew Hall	RHB, RFM	Lions
Jacques Kallis	RHB, RFM	Cape Cobras
Justin Kemp	RHB, RFM	Titans
Garnett Kruger	RHB, RFM	Lions
Charl Langeveldt	RHB, RFM	Lions
André Nel	RHB, RFM	Titans
Shaun Pollock	RHB, RFM	Dolphins
Ashwell Prince	LHB, SLA	Cape Cobras
Jacques Rudolph	LHB, LB	Eagles
Monde Zondeki	RHB, RF	Cape Cobras

Sri Lanka
Name	Style	Domestic team
Marvan Atapattu	CPT, RHB, LB	Sinhalese SC
Kumar Sangakkara	WK, LHB	Nondescripts CC
Russel Arnold	LHB, OB	Nondescripts CC
Malinga Bandara	RHB, LB	Ragama CC
Tillakaratne Dilshan	RHB, OB	Bloomfield C&AC
Dilhara Fernando	RHB, RFM	Sinhalese SC
Mahela Jayawardene	RHB, RM	Sinhalese SC
Chamara Kapugedera	RHB, RM	Colombo CC
Nuwan Kulasekara	RHB, RFM	Galle CC
Farveez Maharoof	RHB, RFM	Bloomfield C&AC
Jehan Mubarak	LHB, OB	Colombo CC
Muttiah Muralitharan	RHB, OB	Tamil Union C&AC
Ruchira Perera	LHB, LFM	Colts CC
Upul Tharanga	LHB	Nondescripts CC
Chaminda Vaas	LHB, LFM	Colts CC

== Warm-up matches ==
=== Queensland v South Africans, 10 January ===
South Africans won by 94 runs The South Africans scored almost twice as much as Queensland in this match, as both Boeta Dippenaar and Jacques Rudolph outscored Queensland's first eight partnerships. Mitchell Johnson, Andy Bichel and Michael Kasprowicz had taken a wicket each in the first twelve overs, and the tourists were three for 44, but Dippenaar and Rudolph added 88 for the fourth wicket before Rudolph was caught behind off Kasprowicz. Though Johnson added two more wickets, Dippenaar ended with 80 from the opening position, and the South Africans' innings totalled 205. Then, during the first 61 balls off the innings, Queensland lost six wickets. Five batsmen went for single-figure scores, as Garnett Kruger and Shaun Pollock shared the six scalps between them. A five-over partnership worth 22 between Bichel and wicket-keeper Chris Hartley took Queensland past 50, before Monde Zondeki had two men caught in the sixteenth over. Eventually, Queensland were bowled out for 111, Bichel sharing a 50-run stand with Nathan Hauritz before he was caught off Johan Botha's bowling. Charl Langeveldt, South Africa's substitute whose main asset was his bowling, was not used.

=== Victoria v Sri Lankans, 11 January ===
Victoria won by seven wickets

Victoria, who had qualified for the Twenty20 Big Bash final three days earlier, had Allan Wise take five wickets when they hosted the Sri Lankans at the Central Reserve in Glen Waverley, Melbourne. After rain had proceedings delayed early on, and reduced each team's innings to 40 overs, Wise got a wicket in his opening over, and continued to end with figures of 8–2–25–5. Seven of the conceded runs were due to wides. When Wise had his final wicket – that of Chamara Kapugedera – the Sri Lankans were six for 57, and though Kumar Sangakkara put on 43 with Farveez Maharoof for the seventh wicket, the total was still 120. Nearly a third of that was due to extras, as 25 wides and eight leg-byes were conceded by Victoria. The hosts lost three for 44 in the first 11 overs, but Michael Klinger and Andrew McDonald saw the Bushrangers home with an unbroken partnership of 77.

=== Queensland Academy of Sport v South Africans, 13 January ===
South Africans won by 46 runs

Half-centuries from Jacques Kallis and Ashwell Prince, who shared a fourth-wicket stand worth 109, took the visitors to a total of seven for 234 after losing two wickets in the first four overs, and though captain Chris Simpson took three for 40 and top-scored with 55 in the reply, the Academy team was bowled out for 188, with Andrew Hall and Johan Botha taking three wickets each. The 14 overs sent down by Garnett Kruger and Kallis cost an aggregate of 92 runs to the two bowlers, while the other 29.3 cost 95.

== Group stage matches ==
=== 1st match: Australia v Sri Lanka ===
13 January 2006
14:15 (D/N)
Scorecard

Australia; 318/5 (50 overs)	v	Sri Lanka; 202/7 (50 overs)
Damien Martyn 70 (64); Ruchira Perera 2/45 (10)		Mahela Jayawardene 50 (47); Nathan Bracken 2/11 (8)

Australia won by 116 runs
Docklands, Melbourne, Australia
Attendance: 33,930
Umpires: MR Benson (ENG) and SJA Taufel (AUS)
Player of the match: A Symonds (AUS)

- Sri Lanka won the toss and elected to field.

Sri Lanka's two most experienced bowlers, Chaminda Vaas and Muttiah Muralitharan, had combined bowling figures of 20–1–140–0, and Australia's total of five for 318 was eventually enough in securing a bonus point. Damien Martyn, playing his first international for three months after he was dropped from the Test side and missed the Chappell–Hadlee Trophy through injury, top-scored with 70, and Simon Katich and Andrew Symonds also hit half-centuries. 80 runs came off the sixth-wicket partnership between Michael Clarke and Mike Hussey, which lasted 66 balls. When Sri Lanka replied, they lost both openers within the first three overs, and Michael Vandort, who batted at three, made his 48 runs at a run rate of just below 2.5 an over, 40% of the required rate. Though Mahela Jayawardene made a half-century, Sri Lanka's final total was not enough to prevent Australia from gaining a bonus point.

=== 2nd match: Australia v South Africa ===
15 January 2006
13:15 (D/N)
Scorecard

Australia; 228 (49.5 overs)	v	South Africa; 231/5 (48.5 overs)
Michael Hussey 73 (107); Shaun Pollock 3/30 (10)		Boeta Dippenaar 74 (115); Glenn McGrath 2/35 (9)

South Africa won by 5 wickets
The Gabba, Brisbane, Australia
Umpires: Aleem Dar (PAK) and Simon Taufel (AUS)
Player of the match: Shaun Pollock (RSA)

- Australia won the toss and elected to bat

Australia won the toss, batted, and had Adam Gilchrist drag a ball from Shaun Pollock onto his own stumps with the very first ball of the match, to see Ricky Ponting at the crease in the first over. Pollock also took the next two wickets, Katich for 0 and Martyn for 12, and ended with bowling figures of 10–2–30–3, and Andrew Hall backed up Pollock's efforts with wickets in successive overs to leave Australia at six for 71. Michael Hussey and Brett Lee then added 123 in nearly 27 overs, making half-centuries in the process, before two run outs left Australia all out for 228. South Africa's first 45 overs yielded 182 runs, leaving them 47 to get off the last 30 deliveries, with Boeta Dippenaar's 74 coming at a rate just above 4 an over, but Justin Kemp and Mark Boucher took 17 off Lee's final over, including one six from Kemp over long on, and with ten balls remaining South Africa needed five runs. A tropical storm caused a "brief delay" before Kemp secured victory with seven balls to spare when he drove a ball from Nathan Bracken through the off side.

=== 3rd match: Sri Lanka v South Africa ===
17 January 2006
13:15 (D/N)
Scorecard

Sri Lanka; 282/6 (50 overs)	v	South Africa; 188 (44.2 ov)
KC Sangakkara 88 (109); J Botha 2/49 (10)		MV Boucher 62 (71); HMCM Bandara 3/31 (8.2)

Sri Lanka won by 94 runs
The Gabba, Brisbane, Australia
Umpires: Aleem Dar (PAK) and DJ Harper (AUS)
Player of the match: KC Sangakkara (SRI)

- South Africa won the toss and elected to field.

South Africa won the toss and elected to field first. This decision was criticised after the game, with Cricinfo journalist Jenny Thompson claiming the toss would "probably be first up" on the list of reasons why South Africa lost. South Africa got a wicket in the sixth over when Garnett Kruger dismissed Upul Tharanga, but half-centuries from Jehan Mubarak and Kumar Sangakkara carried the team to 145 for 2, and a further five batsmen made it into double figures as the Sri Lankans closed on six for 282. Chaminda Vaas then served up bowling figures of 8–2–21–2, removing Graeme Smith and Shaun Pollock, and two run outs and three wickets from Malinga Bandara helped bowl South Africa out for 188 with 34 balls remaining.

=== 4th match: Australia v South Africa ===
20 January 2006
14:15 (D/N)
Scorecard

Australia; 245 (49.2 overs)	v	South Africa; 186 (47 overs)
PA Jaques 94 (112); AJ Hall 4/35 (9.2)		SM Pollock 46 (31); B Lee 5/22 (10)

Australia won by 59 runs
Docklands, Melbourne, Australia
Umpires: MR Benson (ENG) and DJ Harper (AUS)
Player of the match: B Lee (AUS)

- Australia won the toss and elected to bat.

The South African middle order collapsed due mostly to the bowling of Brett Lee, who took five wickets, four of which were bowled. Shaun Pollock had some good batting with several sixes but it was not enough. Australia received a bonus point because they won by more than 50 runs.

=== 5th match: Sri Lanka v Australia ===
22 January 2006
14:15 (D/N)
Scorecard

Sri Lanka; 309/7 (50 overs)	v	Australia; 258 (50 overs)
ST Jayasuriya 114 (96); NW Bracken 2/40 (9)		MJ Clarke 67 (70); HMCM Bandara 4/58 (10)

Sri Lanka won by 51 runs
Sydney Cricket Ground, Sydney, Australia
Umpires: MR Benson (ENG) and SJ Davis (ENG)
Player of the match: ST Jayasuriya (SRI)

- Sri Lanka won the toss and elected to bat.

Adam Gilchrist and Glenn McGrath had both been rested in this game.

=== 6th match: South Africa v Sri Lanka ===
24 January 2006
13:45 (D/N)
Scorecard

South Africa; 263/5 (50 overs)	v	Sri Lanka; 254/8 (50 overs)
HH Dippenaar 125* (145); M Muralitharan 2/45 (10)		TM Dilshan 82* (108); JJ van der Wath 2/37 (10)

South Africa won by 9 runs
Adelaide Oval, Adelaide, Australia
Umpires: Aleem Dar (PAK) and DJ Harper (AUS)
Player of the match: HH Dippenaar (RSA)

- South Africa won the toss and elected to bat.

Sri Lanka were unable to catch South Africa, finishing only a few runs behind. Sri Lanka needed 68 off 60 balls, but South Africa bowled a very good length near the end. The South Africans did very well in the last ten overs.

=== 7th match: Sri Lanka v Australia ===
26 January 2006
13:45 (D/N)
Scorecard

Sri Lanka; 218/8 (50 ov)	v	Australia; 219/5 (48.3 overs)
J Mubarak 34/47; A Symonds 3/48 (9)		SM Katich 52 (89); N Kulasekara 2/32 (9)

Australia won by 5 wickets (with 9 balls remaining)
Adelaide Oval, Adelaide, Australia
Umpires: Aleem Dar (PAK) and SJ Davis (ENG)
Player of the match: A Symonds (AUS)

- Sri Lanka won the toss and elected to bat.

=== 8th match: Australia v Sri Lanka, 29 January ===
29 January 2006
13:30 (D/N)
Scorecard

Sri Lanka; 233/8 (50 overs)	v	Australia; 237/4 (41 overs)
DPMD Jayawardene 69 (93); SR Clark 2/40 (10)		AC Gilchrist 116 (105); WPUJC Vaas 2/40 (8)

Australia won by 6 wickets (with 54 balls remaining)
WACA, Perth, Australia
Umpires: MR Benson (ENG) and PD Parker (AUS)
Player of the match: AC Gilchrist (AUS)

- Sri Lanka won the toss and elected to bat.

Adam Gilchrist struck a century in his home stadium as Australia overtook the target with nine overs to spare.

=== 9th match: Sri Lanka v South Africa ===
31 January 2006
13:30 (D/N)
Scorecard

Sri Lanka; 221 (47.4 overs)	v	South Africa; 224/5 (45.1 overs)
ST Jayasuriya 86 (65); GC Smith 3/30 (10)		HH Dippenaar 87 (94); M Muralitharan 3/44 (10)

South Africa won by 5 wickets (with 29 balls remaining)
WACA, Perth, Australia
Umpires: MR Benson (ENG) and PD Parker (AUS)
Player of the match: GC Smith (RSA)

- Sri Lanka won the toss and elected to bat.

Graeme Smith was Man of the Match due to his all-round efforts, dismissing Jehan Mubarak, Sanath Jayasuriya and Mahela Jayawardene to take the first three wickets for South Africa and help them bowl out Sri Lanka for 221. He then hit 41 in a 70-minute partnership with Boeta Dippenaar, worth 84.

=== 10th Match: Australia v South Africa ===
3 February 2006
14:15 (D/N)
Scorecard

Australia; 281/7 (50 overs)	v	South Africa; 201/9 (50 overs)
A Symonds 65 (60); JJ van der Wath 2/82 (10)		J Botha 46 (61); B Lee 4/30 (10)

Australia won by 80 runs
Docklands, Melbourne, Australia
Umpires: Aleem Dar (PAK) and PD Parker (AUS)
Player of the match: MEK Hussey (AUS)

- Australia won the toss and elected to bat.

Andrew Symonds and Mike Hussey shared a sixth-wicket stand worth 109 in the last thirteen overs, which gave Hussey Man of the Match honours. Defending a total of 281, Brett Lee took four wickets including Graeme Smith in the first over, and South Africa were limited to 201 as Australia grabbed a win and the bonus point.

=== 11th Match: Australia v South Africa ===
5 February 2006
14:15 (D/N)
Scorecard

Australia; 344/6 (50 overs)	v	South Africa; 287/6 (50 overs)
AC Gilchrist 88 (66)		MV Boucher 76 (83); A Symonds 2/42 (10)

Australia won by 57 runs
Sydney Cricket Ground, Sydney, Australia
Umpires: Aleem Dar (PAK) and PD Parker (AUS)
Player of the match: AC Gilchrist (AUS)

- Australia won the toss and elected to bat.

=== 12th Match: Sri Lanka v South Africa ===
7 February 2006
10:00
Scorecard

Sri Lanka; 257/9 (50 overs)	v	South Africa; 181 (43.4 overs)
MS Atapattu 80 (122); AJ Hall 3/50 (10)		GC Smith 67 (76); HMCM Bandara 4/31 (9)

Sri Lanka won by 76 runs
Bellerive Oval, Hobart, Australia
Umpires: MR Benson (ENG) and DJ Harper (AUS)
Player of the match: HMCM Bandara (SRI)

- Sri Lanka won the toss and elected to bat.

== Finals ==
=== 1st final: Australia v Sri Lanka ===
10 February 2006
13:45 (D/N)
Scorecard

Sri Lanka; 274/8 (50 overs)	v	Australia; 252 (49.1 overs)
KC Sangakkara 83 (106); NW Bracken 3/61 (10)		MJ Clarke 80 (83); M Muralitharan 3/40 (10)

Sri Lanka won by 22 runs
Adelaide Oval, Adelaide, Australia
Umpires: Aleem Dar (PAK) and DJ Harper (AUS)
Player of the match: KC Sangakkara (SL)

- Sri Lanka won the toss and elected to bat.

The Australians panicked conceding 5 run outs (4 to Dilshan) and a late rally from Michael Clarke couldn't save them. The Sri Lankan fielding was described as being "impressive" and "masterful".

=== 2nd final: Australia v Sri Lanka ===
12 February 2006
14:15 (D/N)
Scorecard

Australia; 368/5 (50 overs)	v	Sri Lanka; 201 (36 overs)
A Symonds 151 (127); WPUJC Vaas 4/56 (10)		RP Arnold 64* (62); NW Bracken 4/30 (6)

Australia won by 157 runs
Sydney Cricket Ground, Sydney, Australia
Umpires: MR Benson (ENG) and PD Parker (AUS)
Player of the match: A Symonds (AUS)

- Australia won the toss and elected to bat.

Australia had a bad start losing with Vaas taking 3 early wickets to reduce Australia to 3 for 10. Ricky Ponting and Andrew Symonds, after a period of consolidation, combined to provide Australia with its highest One Day International total among 7 other records set that day. Sri Lanka were then bowled all out for 201 in 36 overs as the asking rate was simply too high. Notable during this game was a very fast outfield (called a "lightning-fast SCG outfield"), with both teams hitting balls which easily went for four.

=== 3rd final: Sri Lanka v Australia ===
14 February 2006
13:15 (D/N)
Scorecard

Sri Lanka; 266/7 (50 overs)	v	Australia; 267/1 (45.3 overs)
DPMD Jayawardene 116 (91); NW Bracken 3/44 (10)		AC Gilchrist 122 (91); M Muralitharan 1/50 (10)

Australia won by 9 wickets (with 27 balls remaining)
The Gabba, Brisbane, Australia
Umpires: Aleem Dar (PAK) and DJ Harper (AUS)
Player of the match: AC Gilchrist (AUS)

- Sri Lanka won the toss and elected to bat.

Opening batsmen Gilchrist and Katich gave Australia a huge start in the second innings. Gilchrist was bowled out and replaced by Ricky Ponting. Simon Katich scored his first century in a one-day match in this game. Gilchrist scored his hundred off 67 balls, the fastest ever century in the history of the series.

== Gallery ==
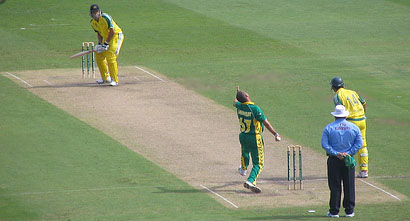
South Africa vs Australia, Andrew Symonds batting

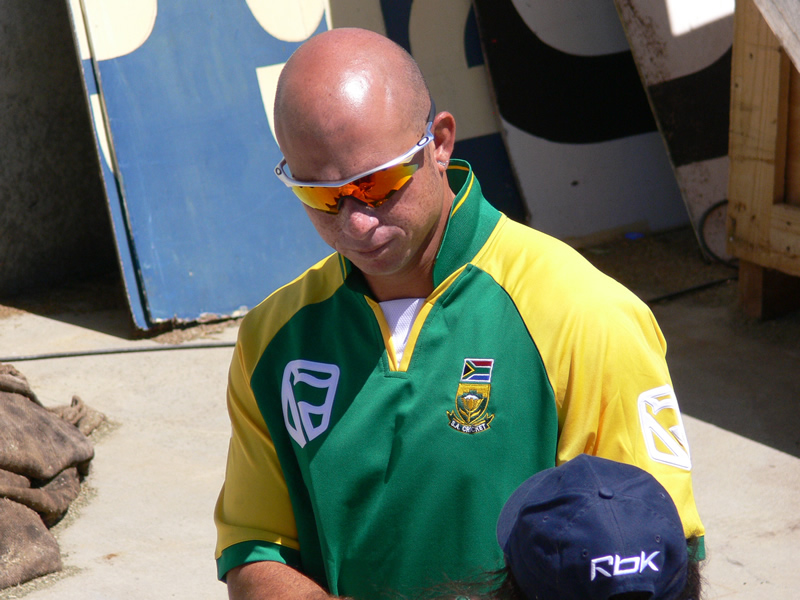
South African cricketer Herschelle Gibbs

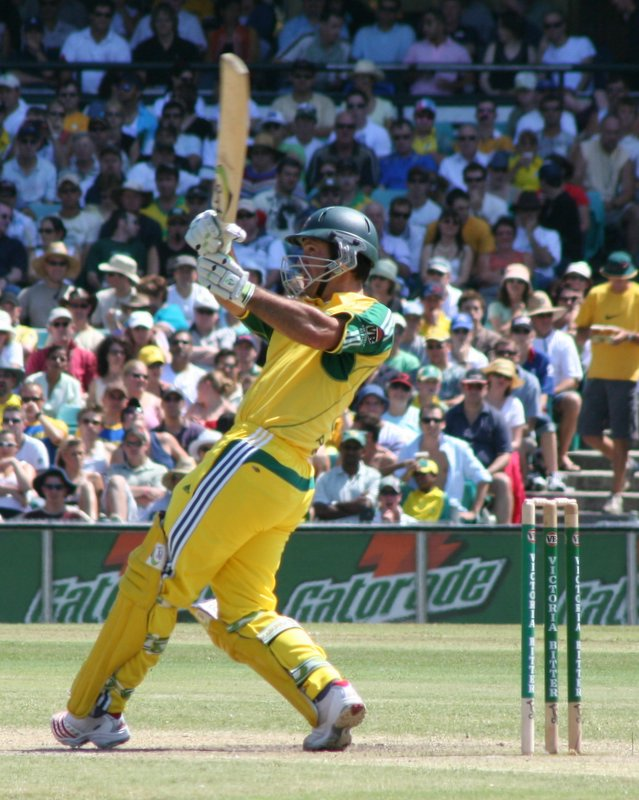
Australia are in trouble at 3/10 when Ricky Ponting decides to smash a couple of sixes. He went on to make 124 – his highest score in an ODI at the SCG. 2nd Final of the VB Series – Australia v Sri Lanka.

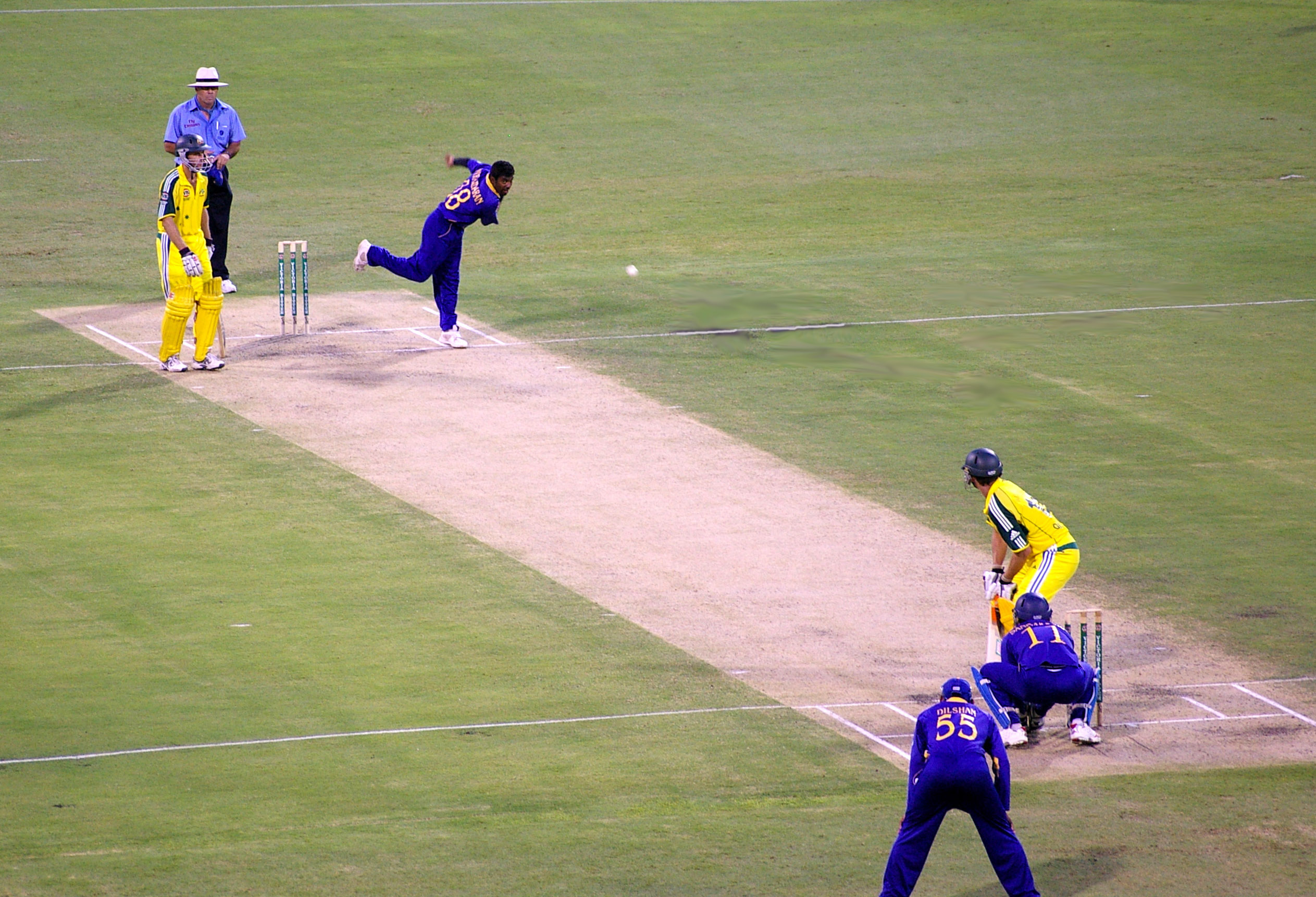
Muttiah Muralitharan bowls to Adam Gilchrist in a one-day international at Brisbane. Gilchrist went on to hit a century off 67 balls. Muralitharan finally bowled him for 122.
