= Australian cricket team in England in 2018 =

International cricket tour

	England	Australia
- Dates: 7 – 27 June 2018
Captains	Eoin Morgan (Note: Jos Buttler captained England for the second ODI.)	Tim Paine (ODIs); Aaron Finch (T20Is)

One Day International series
- Results: England won the 5-match series 5–0
Most runs	Jason Roy (304)	Shaun Marsh (288)
Most wickets	Moeen Ali; Adil Rashid (12)	Kane Richardson; Billy Stanlake (6)
- Player of the series: Jos Buttler (Eng)

Twenty20 International series
- Results: England won the 1-match series 1–0
Most runs	Jos Buttler (61)	Aaron Finch (84)
Most wickets	Chris Jordan; Adil Rashid (3)	Mitchell Swepson (2)

The Australian cricket team toured England in June 2018 to play five One Day International (ODIs) and one Twenty20 International (T20I) matches. Ahead of the ODIs, Australia played List A matches against Sussex and Middlesex. This was Australia's first international tour following the Australian ball tampering scandal as well as Tim Paine's first series as captain in ODIs.

Australia lost the first two ODI matches and, as a result, slipped to sixth place in the ICC ODI Championship. Australia had lost thirteen of their last fifteen completed ODIs, falling to a 34-year low in the ICC rankings. In the next match, England scored the highest innings total in ODIs, scoring 481 runs for the loss of six wickets and, in the process, won the series with two games to play. England won the ODI series 5–0, the first time that Australia had been whitewashed in a five-match ODI series against England. Twelve wickets taken by Moeen Ali and Adil Rashid each are the most for England spinners in a bilateral ODI series. England also won the one-off T20I match, by 28 runs.

== Squads ==
ODIs		T20Is	
England	Australia	England	Australia
Eoin Morgan (c); Moeen Ali; Jonny Bairstow; Jake Ball; Sam Billings; Jos Buttler (wk); Sam Curran; Tom Curran; Alex Hales; Liam Plunkett; Adil Rashid; Joe Root; Jason Roy; Craig Overton; Ben Stokes; David Willey; ~~Chris Woakes~~; Mark Wood	Tim Paine (c, wk); Aaron Finch (vc); Ashton Agar; Alex Carey; ~~Josh Hazlewood~~; Travis Head; Nathan Lyon; Glenn Maxwell; Shaun Marsh; Michael Neser; Jhye Richardson; Kane Richardson; D'Arcy Short; Billy Stanlake; Marcus Stoinis; Andrew Tye	Eoin Morgan (c); Moeen Ali; Jonny Bairstow; Jake Ball; Jos Buttler (wk); Sam Curran; Tom Curran; Alex Hales; Chris Jordan; Liam Plunkett; Adil Rashid; Joe Root; Jason Roy; David Willey	Aaron Finch (c); Alex Carey (vc, wk); Ashton Agar; Travis Head; Nic Maddinson; Glenn Maxwell; Jhye Richardson; Kane Richardson; D'Arcy Short; Billy Stanlake; Marcus Stoinis; Mitchell Swepson; Andrew Tye; Jack Wildermuth

Ahead of the tour, Josh Hazlewood was ruled out of Australia's ODI squad, and he was replaced by Michael Neser. Ben Stokes was unavailable for the first three ODIs of the series due to injury, with Sam Billings added to England's squad as cover. Stokes joined the squad for the last two ODIs. However, he did not play and continued his rehabilitation from injury. Jake Ball was added to England's squad as cover for Chris Woakes. Woakes was eventually ruled out of the tour with an ongoing knee injury. Sam Curran and Craig Overton were added to England's ODI squad for the last two ODIs.

== Tour matches ==
=== List A: Sussex vs Australia ===
7 June 2018
14:00 (D/N)
Scorecard

Australia; 277/9 (50 overs)	v	Sussex; 220 (42.3 overs)
Marcus Stoinis 110 (112); Jofra Archer 3/62 (10 overs)		Phil Salt 62 (57); Ashton Agar 3/64 (10 overs)

Australia won by 57 runs
County Cricket Ground, Hove
Umpires: Ian Blackwell (Eng) and Graham Lloyd (Eng)

- Sussex won the toss and elected to field.

=== List A: Middlesex vs Australia ===
9 June 2018
11:00
Scorecard

Australia; 283/6 (50 overs)	v	Middlesex; 182 (41 overs)
Travis Head 106 (141); Tom Barber 3/62 (9 overs)		Max Holden 71 (71); Kane Richardson 3/31 (9 overs)

Australia won by 101 runs
Lord's, London
Umpires: Jeff Evans (Eng) and Mark Newell (Eng)

- Australia won the toss and elected to bat.
- Robbie White (Middlesex) made his List A debut.

== ODI series ==
=== 1st ODI ===
13 June 2018
13:00 (D/N)
Scorecard

Australia; 214 (47 overs)	v	England; 218/7 (44 overs)
Glenn Maxwell 62 (64); Liam Plunkett 3/42 (8 overs)		Eoin Morgan 69 (74); Andrew Tye 2/42 (10 overs)

England won by 3 wickets
The Oval, London
Umpires: Rob Bailey (Eng) and Kumar Dharmasena (SL)
Player of the match: Moeen Ali (Eng)

- Australia won the toss and elected to bat.
- Michael Neser (Aus) made his ODI debut.
- Tim Paine captained Australia for first time in ODIs.

=== 2nd ODI ===
16 June 2018
11:00
Scorecard

England; 342/8 (50 overs)	v	Australia; 304 (47.1 overs)
Jason Roy 120 (108); Kane Richardson 2/56 (8 overs)		Shaun Marsh 131 (116); Liam Plunkett 4/53 (9.1 overs)

England won by 38 runs
Sophia Gardens, Cardiff
Umpires: Marais Erasmus (SA) and Alex Wharf (Eng)
Player of the match: Jason Roy (Eng)

- Australia won the toss and elected to field.
- D'Arcy Short (Aus) made his ODI debut.
- Alex Wharf (Eng) stood in his first ODI as an umpire.
- England made their highest score against Australia in ODIs.
- Adil Rashid (Eng) took his 100th wicket in ODIs.

=== 3rd ODI ===
19 June 2018
14:00 (D/N)
Scorecard

England; 481/6 (50 overs)	v	Australia; 239 (37 overs)
Alex Hales 147 (92); Jhye Richardson 3/92 (10 overs)		Travis Head 51 (39); Adil Rashid 4/47 (10 overs)

England won by 242 runs
Trent Bridge, Nottingham
Umpires: Kumar Dharmasena (SL) and Tim Robinson (Eng)
Player of the match: Alex Hales (Eng)

- Australia won the toss and elected to field.
- Eoin Morgan scored the most ODI runs for England (5,443). He also scored fastest fifty for England in ODIs (21 balls).
- England set a new record for the highest innings total in ODIs. This was also the first instance where a men's team scored more than 450 runs in an ODI.
- In terms of runs, this was both England's biggest win and Australia's biggest defeat in ODIs.

=== 4th ODI ===
21 June 2018
14:00 (D/N)
Scorecard

Australia; 310/8 (50 overs)	v	England; 314/4 (44.4 overs)
Shaun Marsh 101 (92); David Willey 4/43 (7 overs)		Jason Roy 101 (83); Ashton Agar 2/48 (8 overs)

England won by 6 wickets
Riverside Ground, Chester-le-Street
Umpires: Marais Erasmus (SA) and Michael Gough (Eng)
Player of the match: Jason Roy (Eng)

- Australia won the toss and elected to bat.
- Craig Overton (Eng) made his ODI debut.

=== 5th ODI ===
24 June 2018
11:00
Scorecard

Australia; 205 (34.4 overs)	v	England; 208/9 (48.3 overs)
Travis Head 56 (42); Moeen Ali 4/46 (8.4 overs)		Jos Buttler 110* (122); Billy Stanlake 3/35 (10 overs)

England won by 1 wicket
Old Trafford, Manchester
Umpires: Rob Bailey (Eng) and Kumar Dharmasena (SL)
Player of the match: Jos Buttler (Eng)

- Australia won the toss and elected to bat.
- Sam Curran (Eng) made his ODI debut.

== T20I series ==
=== Only T20I ===
27 June 2018
18:30 (D/N)
Scorecard

England; 221/5 (20 overs)	v	Australia; 193 (19.4 overs)
Jos Buttler 61 (30); Mitchell Swepson 2/37 (4 overs)		Aaron Finch 84 (41); Adil Rashid 3/27 (4 overs)

England won by 28 runs
Edgbaston, Birmingham
Umpires: Michael Gough (Eng) and Alex Wharf (Eng)
Player of the match: Adil Rashid (Eng)

- Australia won the toss and elected to field.
- Mitchell Swepson (Aus) made his T20I debut.
- Jos Buttler scored the fastest fifty for England in T20Is (22 balls).

== In popular culture ==
An Australian docu-series - The Test was produced, following the Australian national cricket team in the aftermath of the Australian ball tampering scandal. The first episode of Season 1 featured the team play the ODIs against England.
