= Johan van der Wath =

South African cricketer

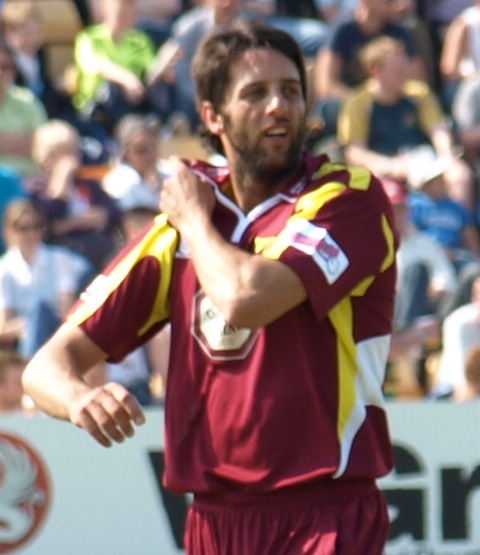

Personal information
- Full name: Johannes Jacobus van der Wath
- Born: 10 January 1978 (age 48); Newcastle, Natal Province, South Africa
- Batting: Right-handed
- Bowling: Right-arm fast-medium
- Role: Bowling Allrounder

International information
- National side: South Africa (2006–2007)
- ODI debut (cap 83): 20 January 2006 v Australia
- Last ODI: 26 August 2007 v Zimbabwe
- T20I debut (cap 24): 24 February 2006 v Australia
- Last T20I: 20 September 2007 v India

Domestic team information
- Years: Team
- 1995–1997: Easterns
- 1997–2011: Free State
- 2003–2014: Knights (squad no. 5)
- 2005: Sussex
- 2007–2009: Northamptonshire (squad no. 24)
- 2010: Canterbury
- 2011: Royal Challengers Bangalore

Career statistics
Competition	ODI	FC	LA	T20
Matches	10	121	175	109
Runs scored	89	3,790	2,418	862
Batting average	14.83	24.77	24.42	16.57
100s/50s	0/0	3/21	0/11	0/0
Top score	37*	154	91	48*
Balls bowled	526	20,729	7,697	2,185
Wickets	13	419	216	108
Bowling average	42.38	25.45	28.19	25.58
5 wickets in innings	0	22	0	0
10 wickets in match	0	1	0	0
Best bowling	2/21	7/60	4/26	4/24
Catches/stumpings	3/–	35/–	39/–	13/–
- Source: ESPNcricinfo, 31 October 2021

Johannes Jacobus van der Wath (born 10 January 1978) is a South African former cricketer who played Limited Over Internationals.

== Playing style ==
Van der Wath is an attacking right-handed batsman who usually bats in the lower middle order coming in and increasing the strike rate. He is also an aggressive right-arm medium-fast bowler who regularly takes wickets with the new ball.

== Domestic career ==
=== South Africa ===
Van der Wath started his career off in 1995 with the Easterns in South Africa where he played one One Day match. The following year he made his first class debut but only played one more match after that before joining Free State for the beginning of the 1997 South African season. He scored his highest first class score of 113* in 2002 while playing for Free State. After 7 seasons with the club he joined the Eagles. It was here where he produced performances good enough for the Protea selectors to take notice of him and in his second season he made his international debut. He was banned from playing in South Africa when he joined the Indian Cricket League.

=== England ===
While still playing in South Africa, he joined Sussex in 2005 as an overseas player for the English season playing in 17 matches altogether. He then joined his second English county in 2007 playing for Northamptonshire, but didn't finish the season after being called up by South Africa for the World Twenty20, and he was replaced by Nicky Boje (who next year became captain). The next year his was signed as a Kolpak player, however just before the season started he was banned by the ECB for playing in the now defunct Indian Cricket League (ICL) alongside four other players including Northampton's new signing Andrew Hall. A month later after an appeal, he and Hall were allowed to play again, a spokesman said it was an "unlawful, unreasonable, capricious and discriminatory" ban. During that year, Johan recorded his best first class figures of 7/60 and took 43 wicket altogether that season. In 2009, he was an important team member of the Northants Steelbacks Twenty20 Cup squad that got to the finals day at Edgbaston. During the group stages he won the match against Worcestershire Royals scoring the 22 needed in the last over that kept Northamptonshire's winning run going. That season proved to be Johan's best season at Northants as he took over 50 first class wickets and scored just under 500 runs. Van der Wath and Riki Wessels were unable to play for the county in the 2010 season.

=== Indian Cricket League ===
Van der Wath only played two seasons of the Indian Cricket League before cancelling his own contract. He played for the Mumbai Champs alongside fellow international cricketers Nathan Astle, Tino Best and Michael Kasprowicz. He played 23 matches with a highest score of 43* against Ahmedabad Rockets and his best figures were 3/24 versus Chennai Superstars.

For the 2011 season he has joined Royal Challengers Bangalore in the IPL.

== International career ==
He played for Under 19's South African team in 97 making two appearances against Pakistan, making the step up to 'A' cricket four years later, playing up until 2006. Although Johan never played test cricket, he was a regular in the Protea one day side between 2006 and 2007 playing 10 ODI's and also 8 international Twenty20 matches. It was during this period in one of the matches, he scored a quick fire 35 from 18 balls on the way to the World Famous Chase of 434 against Australia. His debut came when Jacques Kallis was injured during the VB Series in Australia, and played his first game at the Telstra Dome, in Melbourne. He retired from International Cricket in 2007 after South Africa also banned him due to him playing in the rebel Indian Cricket League. Two years later though, Johan along with Northants teammate Andrew Hall were allowed to play for their country again after ending their contracts with the ICL before the deadline of 31 May 2009 set by Cricket South Africa.
