= Boeta Dippenaar =

South African cricketer

Personal information
- Full name: Hendrik Human Dippenaar
- Born: 14 June 1977 (age 49); Kimberley, Cape Province, South Africa
- Batting: Right-handed
- Bowling: Right-arm offbreak
- Role: Batsman

International information
- National side: South Africa (1999–2007)
- Test debut (cap 273): 29 October 1999 v Zimbabwe
- Last Test: 26 January 2007 v Pakistan
- ODI debut (cap 56): 26 September 1999 v India
- Last ODI: 10 June 2007 v Asia XI
- Only T20I (cap 14): 9 January 2006 v Australia

Domestic team information
- Years: Team
- 1995–2004: Free State
- 2004–2013: Knights/Eagles
- 2008–2009: Leicestershire

Career statistics
Competition	Test	ODI	FC	LA
Matches	38	107	197	246
Runs scored	1,718	3,421	12,324	7,637
Batting average	30.14	42.23	40.14	39.56
100s/50s	3/7	4/26	34/56	8/52
Top score	177*	125*	250*	125*
Balls bowled	12	0	120	18
Wickets	0	–	1	1
Bowling average	–	–	66.00	7.00
5 wickets in innings	–	–	0	0
10 wickets in match	–	–	0	0
Best bowling	–	–	1/6	1/5
Catches/stumpings	27/–	36/–	217/–	92/–
- Source: ESPNcricinfo, 29 August 2017

Hendrik Human Dippenaar (born 14 June 1977), known as Boeta Dippenaar, is a former South African cricketer who played all formats of the game. He is also a member of ACA African XI. He has played as a specialist batsman in most of his matches, and has played Test cricket in all batting positions from one through seven. He bats right-handed and bowls occasional off breaks.

In January 2008 Dippenaar retired from international cricket at the age of 30 to concentrate on improving his qualifications for life after cricket. He finished his career with a high average of 42.23 in ODIs for South Africa.

== International career ==
Dippenaar made his international debut in September 1999, playing two of South Africa's four One Day Internationals as an opening batsman during the LG Cup in Kenya, which South Africa won, and he also played both Tests in the home-and-away Test series with Zimbabwe in October and November that same month, making 56 runs in four innings.

He was in and out of both the Test and One Day International team during the next five years, never playing more than eight Tests in succession, but during the tour of the West Indies in 2004–05 Dippenaar's form showed signs of improving. He was selected for two Tests against the West Indies, recording two fifties in three innings, and subsequently averaged 105.66 in the 5-ODI series against the West Indies.

However, he made four sub-25 scores in his next ODIs, before a wrist injury ruled him out of the remaining four matches against New Zealand and the tour of India in November. By December, Dippenaar had recovered, and he turned out for the Eagles in three Standard Bank Cup matches in that month, scoring 49 runs in his three innings. The South African selectors did, however, call on him for the one-day leg of the tour of Australia, which included the VB Series.
