= Roger Telemachus =

South African cricketer (born 1973)

Personal information
- Full name: Roger Telemachus
- Born: 27 March 1973 (age 53); Stellenbosch, Cape Province
- Batting: Right-handed
- Bowling: Right-arm fast-medium

International information
- National side: South Africa (1998–2007)
- ODI debut (cap 49): 3 April 1998 v Pakistan
- Last ODI: 20 September 2006 v Zimbabwe
- T20I debut (cap 23): 24 February 2006 v Australia
- Last T20I: 2 February 2007 v Pakistan

Career statistics
Competition	ODI	T20I	FC	LA
Matches	37	3	78	176
Runs scored	73	5	1,308	702
Batting average	6.08	–	15.95	13.50
100s/50s	0/0	0/0	1/2	0/1
Top score	29	5*	116	53*
Balls bowled	1,918	72	12,224	8,377
Wickets	56	2	228	249
Bowling average	27.94	45.00	28.14	25.25
5 wickets in innings	0	0	7	2
10 wickets in match	0	0	0	0
Best bowling	4/43	1/22	6/21	32/–
Catches/stumpings	4/–	0/–	20/–	4/31
- Source: ESPNcricinfo, 6 December 2013

Roger Telemachus (born 27 March 1973) is a former South African international cricketer. He played 37 One Day Internationals and three Twenty20 Internationals for his country.

== International career ==
In the famous 438-game played at the Wanderers on 12 March 2006, he got the wickets of two top Australian batsmen: Adam Gilchrist and Ricky Ponting, both caught in the field from his bowling.

Telemachus was also involved in what is probably the most bizarre stoppage in the history of cricket, when 'calamari stopped play'. During a regional match in South Africa, Telemachus was bowling to Daryll Cullinan, who hit the ball for six, whereupon it ended up in the kitchen and straight into a pan of frying calamari. According to Wisden, "Even then, the bowler was unable to grip the ball and it had to be replaced".
