= Stuart Clark =

Australian cricketer

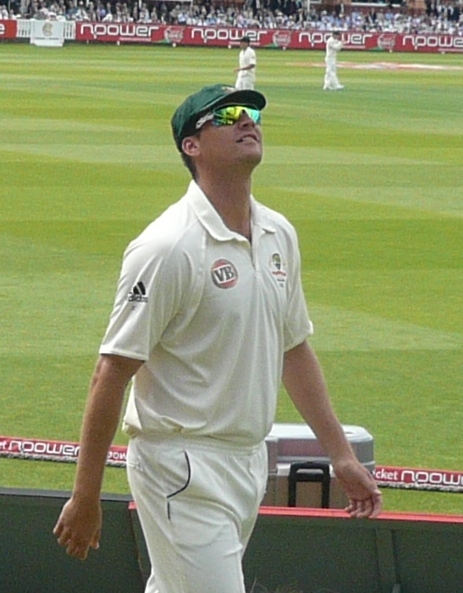

Personal information
- Full name: Stuart Rupert Clark
- Born: 28 September 1975 (age 51); Sutherland, New South Wales
- Nickname: Sarfraz
- Height: 1.95 m (6 ft 5 in)
- Batting: Right-handed
- Bowling: Right-arm fast-medium
- Role: Bowler

International information
- National side: Australia (2005-2009)
- Test debut (cap 396): 16 March 2006 v South Africa
- Last Test: 20 August 2009 v England
- ODI debut (cap 153): 7 October 2005 v ICC World XI
- Last ODI: 1 May 2009 v Pakistan
- ODI shirt no.: 8
- T20I debut (cap 15): 9 January 2006 v South Africa
- Last T20I: 20 October 2007 v India

Domestic team information
- Years: Team
- 1997/98–2011/12: New South Wales
- 2004–2005: Middlesex
- 2007: Hampshire

Career statistics
Competition	Test	ODI	FC	LA
Matches	24	39	105	139
Runs scored	248	69	1,324	241
Batting average	13.05	13.80	13.79	9.26
100s/50s	0/0	0/0	0/1	0/0
Top score	39	16*	62	29
Balls bowled	5,146	1,829	21,430	7,065
Wickets	94	53	377	187
Bowling average	23.86	27.86	27.25	27.11
5 wickets in innings	2	0	13	1
10 wickets in match	0	0	1	0
Best bowling	5/32	4/54	8/58	6/27
Catches/stumpings	4/–	10/–	27/–	29/–
Medal record
Men's Cricket
Representing Australia
ICC Cricket World Cup
Winner	2007 West Indies
- Source: CricketArchive, 12 December 2009

Stuart Rupert Clark (born 28 September 1975) is an Australian former cricketer who played for New South Wales and the Australian team. He was a right-arm fast-medium bowler. His nickname "Sarfraz" originates from the similarities of his bowling style to Sarfraz Nawaz. Clark was also a member of the Australian team that won the 2007 Cricket World Cup.

== Personal life ==
Clark is the son of Anglo-Indian parents; his father Bruce Clark is from Chennai and his mother Mary (née Boosey) is from Kolar Gold Fields (K.G.F).

Clark finished a Master of Commerce, majoring in finance, in 2009 and then completed a degree in law at the University of Sydney. He worked as a real estate agent for 5 years before he pursued cricket.

Clark is married to Michelle, with whom he has three children.

== Domestic career ==
=== New South Wales ===
Clark started out playing first-grade cricket for Sutherland District Cricket Club, opening the bowling with Glenn McGrath in that club's Sydney Grade Cricket grand final win in the 1995–96 season. Clark made his first-class debut with the New South Wales Blues on 4 February 1998 against Tasmania at the Sydney Cricket Ground. He had a poor debut season, taking only 4 wickets at an average of 76.75. The 1998–99 season also saw Clark struggle as he took only 2 wickets at an average of 220.50. After his first 7 first-class matches, Clark averaged 124.66 with the ball. His poor performances led to him being dropped during the 1998–99 season and he did not play a first-class match for over 2 years.

Clark returned for New South Wales in the 2000–01 season and enjoyed a solid comeback season, taking 8 wickets at 25.75 in the 3 matches he played. After these performances, he retained his place in the team for 2001–02, a season which would prove to be his breakthrough one. Clark played 9 matches in the season, taking 45 wickets at an average of 23.26. He claimed four 5 wicket hauls and finished second behind Australian paceman Michael Kasprowicz in the leading wicket-takers list. With a promotion to a national contract, Clark had another strong season for New South Wales in 2002–03 securing 30 wickets at an average of 30.33. While the 2003–04 season was less successful for Clark, taking 23 wickets at 38.26, 2004–05 saw a return to form as he took 40 wickets at 24.77. Clark only played 4 matches for New South Wales in the 2005–06 season yet still managed to take 17 wickets at 22.05.

Clark's full-time call up to the national team in 2006–07 also saw him play fewer matches in the 2006–07 domestic season, yet the three matches he played saw him take 21 wickets at 14.47. During this season, Clark recorded his highest ever first-class score with 62 off 43 balls against South Australia at the Adelaide Oval. Clark brought up his half-century off 34 balls and his innings included 4 sixes and 3 fours. In the same match, Clark claimed his best ever first-class figures at the time, taking 6/39 in South Australia's second innings. In the next match he played for New South Wales, Clark exceeded these figures by taking 8/58 against Western Australia at the WACA Ground. Clark ended up taking 10 wickets for the match, and his first innings figures included a hat-trick, as he took the wickets of Marcus North, Adam Voges and Steve Magoffin in successive deliveries to reduce Western Australia to 4/2.

=== County Cricket ===
He had a run of injuries in 2003–04, but recovered to play first-class cricket for Middlesex in England in 2005.

He played for Hampshire in the 2007 English cricket season.

=== Retirement ===
Clark initially announced his retirement from state cricket in May 2011 but continued playing on a "part-time" basis in the IPL and domestic limited-overs matches while juggling his position as a manager of new Twenty20 franchise Sydney Sixers. He remained in the Blues' team sheet for the 2011–12 season as injury cover before retiring permanently from all cricket in February 2012. He ended his playing career on a high by leading his club team Sydney University to Belvidere Cup triumph.

== International career ==
=== Surprise inclusion in squad ===
In the 2005 Ashes series, in a shock decision, he was called into the Australia national cricket team squad for the fourth and fifth Tests covering for Glenn McGrath and Brett Lee after they both suffered injuries; however, both McGrath and Lee overcame the injuries early and went on to play. Australia Chairman of selectors Trevor Hohns said: We consider Stuart to be a similar style bowler to Glenn McGrath ... he is already in England and showing some good form, so we have selected him to provide some cover for the current injuries.

=== ODI debut ===
In October 2005 Clark was again called into the Australian One Day International ICC Super Series squad against the ICC World XI, covering Shaun Tait but did not play in the first match on 5 October. He made his debut later in that series, and also played against New Zealand in the 05/06 Chappell–Hadlee series. He had vindicated the decision of the selectors somewhat with his solid performances in the ODI arena, however many fans expressed disbelief at the fact that Clark was selected ahead of players such as Paul Rofe, Mick Lewis, Jason Gillespie and Andrew Bichel who had been performing to a higher standard at state level. On 23 February 2007, Clark was named in the Australian World Cup Squad as a replacement for the injured Brett Lee.

=== Early Test career ===
On 16 March 2006, Clark was included in the Australian Test squad, replacing Glenn McGrath (who was attending his sick wife Jane) for the tour of South Africa. He made his debut in the first Test at Cape Town. Clark had an immediate impact on the game, dismissing Graeme Smith early in South Africa's innings, on his way to five wickets. He captured another four in the second innings, to finish with match figures of 9/89 and the player of the match award.

In the second Test at Durban, he took four wickets, and in the third Test at Johannesburg, he returned figures of 3/81 and 4/34. Altogether, he was the leading wicket-taker of the series with 20 wickets (at 15.85 average) and was voted player of the series.

As expected Clark warranted selection for the Australian tour of Bangladesh which followed immediately after the South African whitewash. However, it was a forgettable tour for Clark who managed to pick up just one wicket in the first innings, and was overshadowed by recalled veteran Jason Gillespie. Clark was "released from duty" for the second Test as the Australian selectors decided to replace him with budding spinner Dan Cullen in Chittagong. However, at the time, media reports stated that Clark was given compassionate leave to attend the birth of his son – Clark later suggested that the "rest" was not necessary in any case. However, by the end of the Bangladesh series, Clark maintained his spot above Jason Gillespie in the pecking order of Australian fast bowlers.

=== Ashes series 2006–07 ===
Clark made his Ashes debut at the 'Gabba on 23 November 2006 in the 2006/07 series. In the first Test, he captured seven wickets as England fell to a 277-run defeat and performed similarly well in the second Test where he was the best of the bowlers as Australia triumphed by 6 wickets. Playing the final Test on his home ground in Sydney, Clark took 3 wickets in the first innings before striking 35 runs off only 47 balls with the bat in Australia's first innings.

He ended the series with the most wickets (with 26 at an average of 17, which was twice as many as any English player managed) and the best strike rate of all bowlers, surpassing even retiring greats Glenn McGrath and Shane Warne.

== Post-retirement ==
Clark was named general manager of Sydney Sixers in May 2011 and held the position while playing part-time. He stepped down in November 2012.
