= Mark Boucher =

South African cricketer (born 1976)

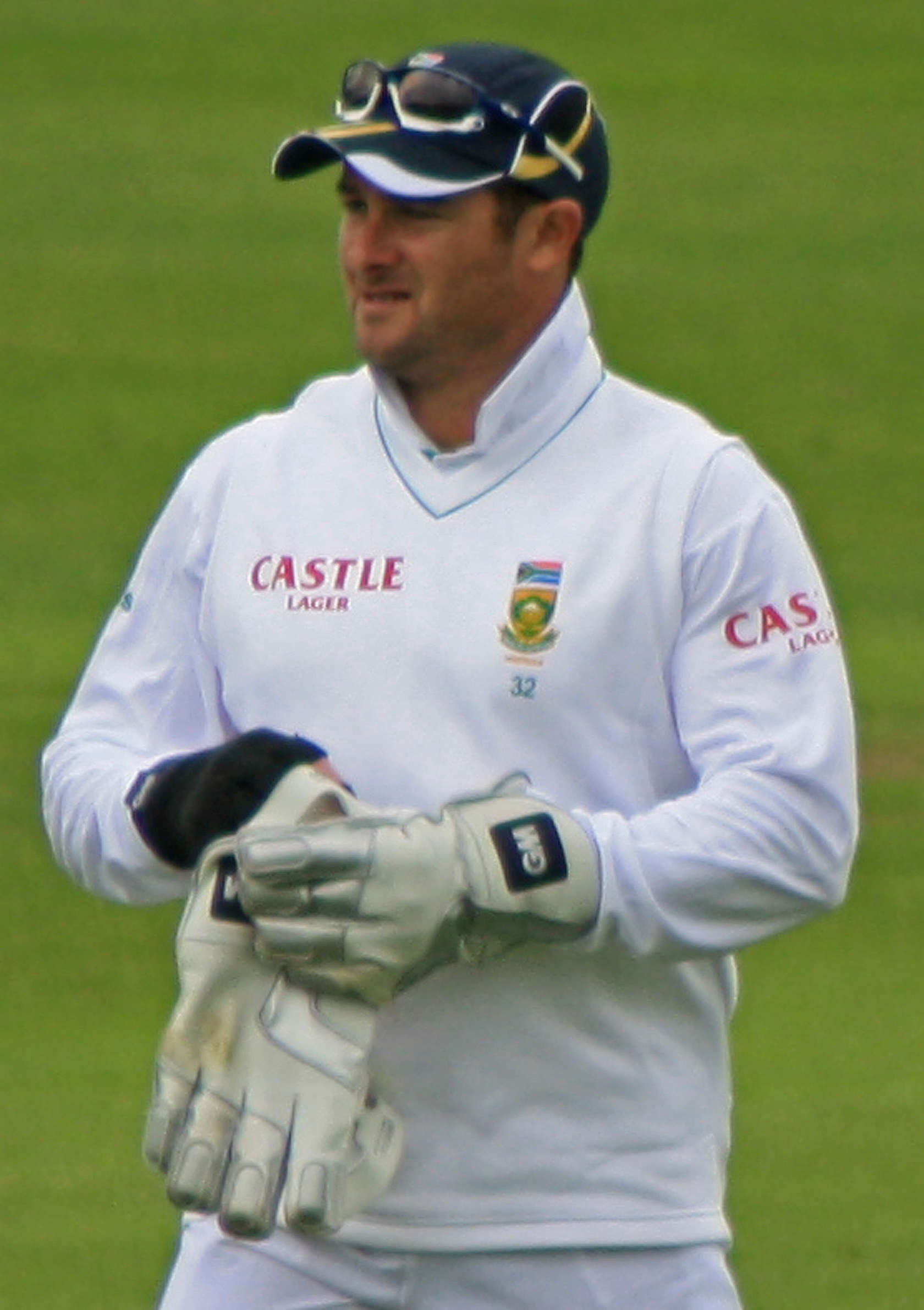
- Boucher playing his last game for South Africa against Somerset in July 2012

Personal information
- Full name: Mark Verdon Boucher
- Born: 3 December 1976 (age 49); East London, Eastern Cape, South Africa
- Height: 5 ft 6 in (1.68 m)
- Batting: Right-handed
- Bowling: Right arm medium
- Role: Wicket-keeper-batsman

International information
- National side: South Africa (1997–2012)
- Test debut (cap 267): 17 October 1997 v Pakistan
- Last Test: 3 January 2012 v Sri Lanka
- ODI debut (cap 46): 16 January 1998 v New Zealand
- Last ODI: 28 October 2011 v Australia
- ODI shirt no.: 9
- T20I debut (cap 2): 21 October 2005 v New Zealand
- Last T20I: 10 May 2010 v Pakistan
- T20I shirt no.: 9

Domestic team information
- Years: Team
- 1995/96–2002/03: Border
- 2004/05–2012: Warriors
- 2008–2010: Royal Challengers Bangalore
- 2011: Kolkata Knight Riders

Head coaching information
- Years: Team
- 2019—2022: South Africa
- 2023—2024: Mumbai Indians

Career statistics
Competition	Test	ODI	FC	LA
Matches	147	295	212	365
Runs scored	5,515	4,686	8,803	6,218
Batting average	30.30	28.57	33.34	28.19
100s/50s	5/35	1/26	10/53	2/35
Top score	125	147*	134	147*
Balls bowled	8	–	32	–
Wickets	1	–	1	–
Bowling average	6.00	–	26.00	–
5 wickets in innings	0	–	0	–
10 wickets in match	0	–	0	–
Best bowling	1/6	–	1/6	–
Catches/stumpings	532/23	403/22	712/37	484/31
Medal record
Representing South Africa
Men's Cricket
Commonwealth Games
Gold medal – first place	1998 Kuala Lumpur	Team
- Source: ESPNcricinfo, 10 September 2017

Mark Verdon Boucher (born 3 December 1976) is a South African cricket coach and former cricketer who played all three formats of the game. Boucher is regarded as one of the best wicket-keeper batsmen of all time, and holds the record for the most Test dismissals by a wicket-keeper, with 532 catches and 555 total dismissals. Boucher was a member of the South Africa team that won the 1998 ICC KnockOut Trophy, the only time the country had won an ICC trophy until the 2025 World Test Championship final.

He has represented Border, Warriors, South Africa, Africa XI, ICC World XI and Royal Challengers Bangalore and Kolkata Knight Riders in the Indian Premier League.

He had been a regular feature of the South African side since the 1997/1998 tour to Australia, until his retirement from international cricket in July 2012 after a serious eye injury against Somerset.

In 2021, during the Cricket South Africa's (CSA) Social Justice and Nation Building (SJN) transformation public hearings, Paul Adams claimed under oath that Mark Boucher and other teammates racially abused him by calling him a "brown shit" in a team song.

== Early life ==
Born in East London, Boucher was educated at Selborne College where he was coached by Richard Pybus.

== International career ==
=== Wicket-keeping role ===
From the time he replaced Dave Richardson until his retirement, Boucher was South Africa's first-choice wicketkeeper and is widely regarded as one of, if not the, greatest wicketkeepers South Africa has ever had. He holds the record for the most dismissals (catches and stumpings) in Test cricket. He reached the record originally when he overtook the former Australian wicketkeeper Ian Healy in the first test of the Bank Alfalah Test Series versus Pakistan in Karachi on 3 October 2007 when he stumped Umar Gul off the bowling of Paul Harris. He then lost the record to Adam Gilchrist before regaining it when he caught Mushfiqur Rahim of Bangladesh in February 2008.

Boucher is also third on the all-time list in One Day Internationals.

=== Batting credentials ===
He once held the record for the highest score by a nightwatchman in Test cricket with 125 for South Africa v Zimbabwe at Harare in November 1999. On 12 March 2006 he hit the winning runs for South Africa against Australia in what had been the Greatest One Day International ever played.

Later in 2006, on 20 September, he made his maiden ODI century, hitting an unbeaten 147 against Zimbabwe from a mere 68 balls. His hundred came up off just 44 balls, the second-fastest ODI century ever by a South African after AB de Villiers. Boucher did benefit, however, from some very poor Zimbabwean fielding, being dropped no fewer than six times during his innings. He played over one hundred consecutive ODIs for his country and is one of only eleven players, including Hansie Cronjé and Shaun Pollock, to achieve this.

In February 2007 he and Jacques Kallis combined to hit Mohammad Asif for 28 runs off an over in an ODI at SuperSport Park in Centurion. It broke the South African record for most runs off an over which was previously held by both Shaun Pollock and Graeme Smith with 27. However, this was later broken by Herschelle Gibbs with 36 runs off one over, the most possible without no-balls or wides.

=== Vice captaincy ===
In the period while the team was under Shaun Pollock's leadership, Boucher was the regular vice-captain of the team and lead the team in tests four times. These matches include a victory over Australia, an achievement which Pollock could not manage.

=== Breaking records ===
Boucher started his 2007 Cricket World Cup campaign in good form with a 21-ball half-century, the then fastest in World Cup history (before being beaten by Brendon McCullum's 20-ball effort six days later) – scoring 75 not out against the Netherlands as South Africa scored 353 for 4 wickets in a rain-shortened World Cup match. However, this was overshadowed by Herschelle Gibbs's six sixes in an over, the 3rd time ever in world cricket and the first time in a One Day International match, and thus in the World Cup.

He became the first wicketkeeper in the history of test cricket to reach the milestone of 400 dismissals when he caught Danish Kaneria off the bowling of Makhaya Ntini on 10 October 2007 in the second test of the Bank Alfalah Test Series against Pakistan at Gaddafi Stadium, Lahore.

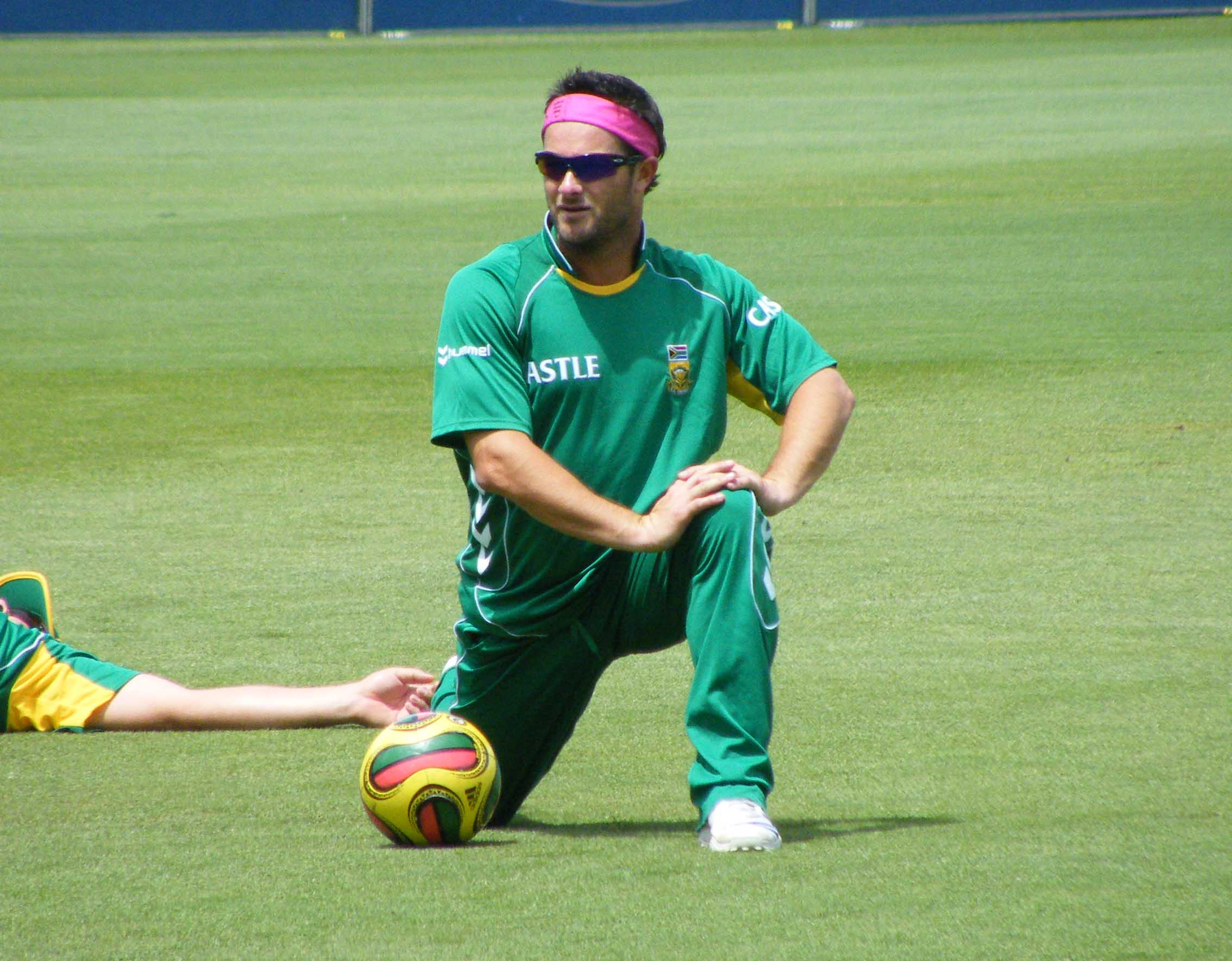
Mark Boucher training at the Sydney Cricket Ground in January 2009

Despite being South Africa's consistent wicket-keeper for a long time, age meant that batsman AB de Villiers was given a chance with the gloves and he impressed. However, de Villiers is one of the team's best outfielders and therefore Boucher continued to feature in the team.

He participated in the 2010 ICC World Twenty20 and the South African coach Corrie van Zyl said that both Boucher and Herschelle Gibbs have the chance to get back in the team. He stated that Boucher will get his chance in the team provided that he performs in the domestic ODI tournament and that both of them had a good chance in playing for the 2011 Cricket World Cup He was however still selected for the Test series against Pakistan and continues to be South Africa's number one test wicket-keeper Also during that time Boucher recovered from his six-week shoulder injury and stated that he is desperate for a return to international cricket. He stated that his main aim was to participate in the 2011 Cricket World Cup.

=== Eye injury and subsequent retirement ===
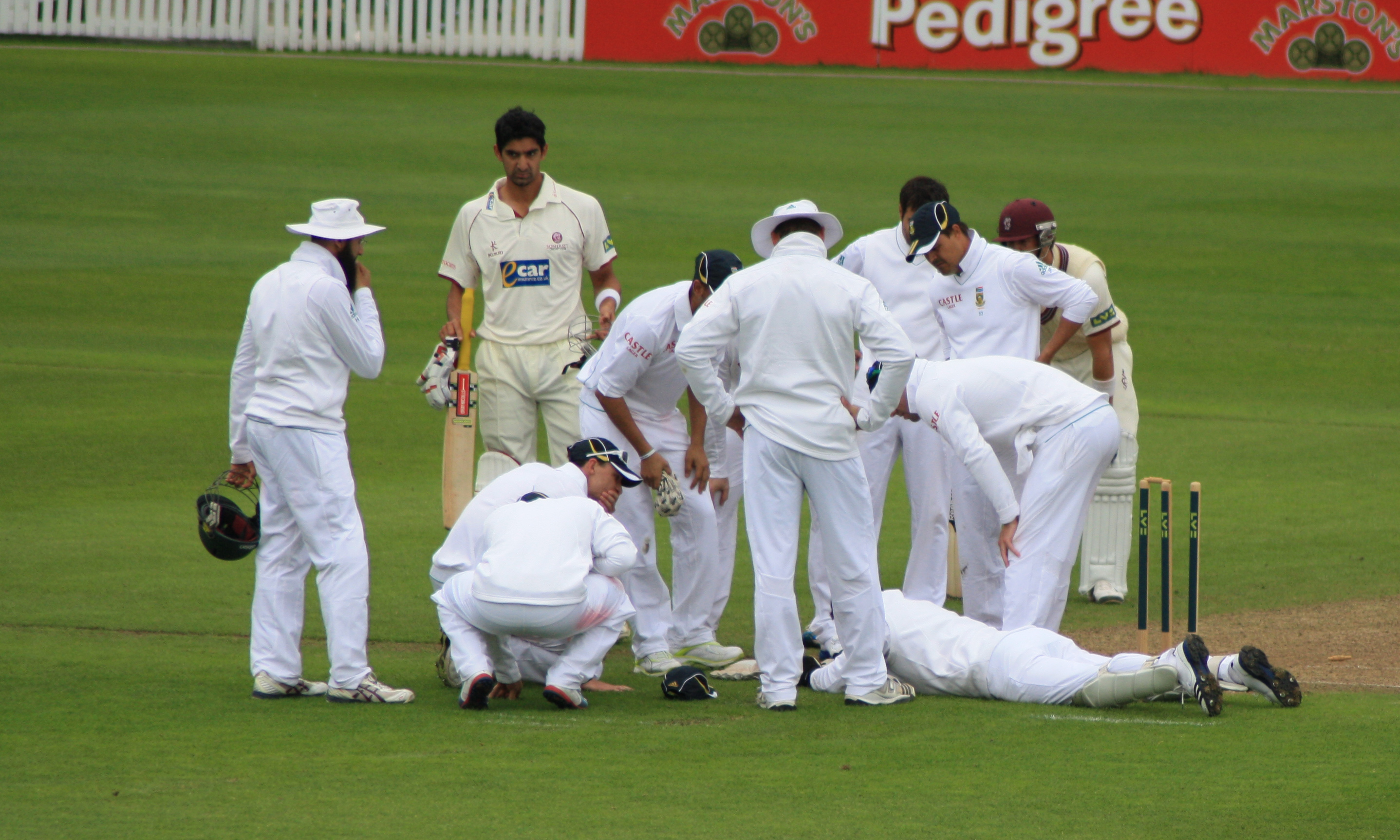
Boucher is surrounded by the South African team immediately after suffering his eye injury against Somerset in 2012.

Boucher suffered a serious eye injury on 9 July 2012, after being struck on his left eye by a bail. He was not wearing a protective helmet or glasses when he was struck by the bail after leg-spinner Imran Tahir bowled Somerset's Gemaal Hussain. Following surgery to the eyeball, Boucher was ruled out of the rest of the tour. Due to the severity of the injury, Boucher—who had planned to retire at the end of the tour—retired from International Cricket on 10 July.

There was no damage to the retina, so it was felt that there was a chance for Boucher to recover some vision in the damaged eye. After undergoing two operations on his injured eye, surgeons announced that they were "cautiously optimistic".

== Coaching ==
Boucher was appointed head coach of the Titans in August 2016, despite having no prior coaching experience. He led the Titans to five domestic titles - two One Day Cups, two T20 Challenge titles and one four-day Sunfoil Series trophy.

In December 2019, Boucher was appointed as head coach of the South Africa national cricket team.

In September 2022, Boucher was appointed as head coach of Mumbai Indians. He was replaced as head coach after the 2024 Indian Premier League season in which Mumbai finished bottom of the table.

== Honours ==
Tributes included comments from Shaun Pollock and Kevin Pietersen. Pollock congratulated him on a great career, while Pietersen called for more support from fans and those involved in sports, saying "Let’s keep it going! Bouch is a fighter!".

In May 2017, he was named Coach of the Year at Cricket South Africa's annual awards.

- South Africa Player of the Year 1998
- South Africa Player of the Year 2000
- South Africa Player of the Year 2006
- Wisden Cricketer of the Year 2009

== Achievements ==
- Holds the record for the most dismissals as wicketkeeper in all forms of international cricket (998).
- Holds the record for the most catches taken by a wicketkeeper in all forms of international cricket (952).
- Holds the record for playing the most T20 innings without a career duck (76).
- Most byes conceded by a wicketkeeper in a T20I innings (15).
- He along with Justin Kemp set the record for the highest 6th wicket stand in ICC Champions Trophy history (131).

== Controversy ==
On 23 August 2021, Boucher issued an apology for past racist behaviour, admitting to having participated in activities that were discriminatory and racially offensive. Boucher admitted to having been part of a group that sang offensive songs and used racial nicknames for non-Caucasian teammates. In the wake of the admission and apology, there were calls for Boucher to resign or be sacked as head coach of the South African Cricket team. Despite handing over a written submission as an apology for his conduct, some say that Boucher lacks common sense, lacks sensitivity and has a "lack of understanding of South Africa's racial history". The allegations regarding his racist conduct have also raised eyebrows over his coaching tenure with the South African side in the future, due to the possibility of the CSA terminating his contract.

Further investigations revealed that Boucher influenced the team's culture by dealing only with white players concerns regarding the Black Lives Matter movement and it was evident during the course of the 2021 ICC Men's T20 World Cup, with a minor few players on the South African side refusing to take a knee before the start of play. Boucher was also accused of having maintained poor player management during his coaching tenure with the assistant coach Enoch Nkwe. He was accused in the charge sheet for not delegating tasks to Nkwe as well as for not giving proper clarification to Nkwe which made it impossible for Nkwe to work with Boucher. In May 2022, Cricket South Africa (CSA) withdrew charges against him.

Preceded by Shaun Pollock	South African Test cricket captain 2001/2	Succeeded by Shaun Pollock
