= Mick Lewis =

Australian cricketer (born 1974)

Personal information
- Full name: Michael Llewellyn Lewis
- Born: 29 June 1974 (age 52); Greensborough, Victoria, Australia
- Nickname: Billy
- Height: 183 cm (6 ft 0 in)
- Batting: Right-handed
- Bowling: Right-arm fast-medium
- Role: Bowler

International information
- National side: Australia (2005–2006)
- ODI debut (cap 155): 7 December 2005 v New Zealand
- Last ODI: 12 March 2006 v South Africa
- T20I debut (cap 17): 9 January 2006 v South Africa
- Last T20I: 24 February 2006 v South Africa

Domestic team information
- Years: Team
- 1999/2000–2007/08: Victoria
- 2004: Glamorgan
- 2005–2006: Durham
- 2010/11: Western Australia

Career statistics
Competition	ODI	T20I	FC	LA
Matches	7	2	82	94
Runs scored	4	–	693	127
Batting average	–	–	9.49	9.07
100s/50s	0/0	–	0/1	0/0
Top score	4*	–	54*	19
Balls bowled	341	45	14751	4,508
Wickets	7	4	277	121
Bowling average	55.85	12.25	29.09	30.52
5 wickets in innings	0	0	7	1
10 wickets in match	0	0	0	0
Best bowling	3/56	2/18	6/59	5/48
Catches/stumpings	1/–	1/–	35/–	25/–
- Source: CricInfo, 29 December 2007

Michael Llewellyn Lewis (born 29 June 1974) is an Australian cricketer.

== Grade career and state career ==
Born in Greensborough, Victoria, Lewis was a grade cricketer who played for Northcote and the Victorian Bushrangers gave him his first-class debut in the 1999/2000 season. Over the next few years, he re-modelled his action and considerably improved his game, and had outstanding seasons in 2002/03, 2003/04 (the season in which Victoria won the Pura Cup) and 2004/05.

He was one of two Australian overseas players for Durham CCC in 2006 (the other was Jimmy Maher, brought back on the back of success as a back-up in 2005. He did not live up to expectations as he proved expensive at times, and he averaged 76.33 with the ball in the ECB's 40-over one day competition, the pro40. He was also warned by the ECB for swearing.

== Call up to national team ==
Lewis played seven One Day Internationals and two T20 internationals for Australia, all between December 2005 and March 2006.

=== Debut series ===
Lewis' debut series was against New Zealand in the Chappell–Hadlee Trophy.

Lewis was crucial in his first game, taking three wickets for the match as well as a run out in the final over which helped secure victory. His second match, however, was a different story. Lewis was the most expensive bowler, with the figures of 1/77 off nine overs as New Zealand successfully chased down a record 331.

His spot in the team was not secure, as the 31-year-old Lewis had been dropped for the VB Series in favour of 28-year-old paceman Brett Dorey, only to be recalled late in the series to replace Glenn McGrath who had returned home due to a recurrence of his wife's cancer. There were signs Lewis' bowling was improving when he snared 2/38 off 10 overs in the 4th ODI in South Africa.

=== Most expensive ODI bowling ===
In the multiple record-breaking 5th One Day International between South Africa and Australia, Lewis had the ignominy of becoming the most expensive bowler in ODI history with figures of 10-0-113-0 in his 10 overs. Lewis was then dropped from the Australian squad, and later his central contract was not renewed.

=== Road to retirement ===
Following Lewis' dropping from the national side, he continued to play for Victoria, and was a handy contributor until injury struck the following season, and Lewis was forced out during a time in which Victoria did not have a single fit contracted pace bowler in their entire squad. This opened the door for several young pacemen, such as Darren Pattinson and Clinton McKay to make their debuts, and when Lewis returned from injury, he found it difficult to adjust and return to his previous form. By the following season, Lewis was struggling to keep his spot in the side consistently.

In early 2008, Lewis announced his retirement from all forms of cricket, citing the fact that his mind was not in it anymore and hoping to allow younger bowlers to continue their progress.

=== Return from retirement ===
In 2008-2009, Mick Lewis began playing for Coburg Cricket Club in the Victorian Subdistrict Cricket Association. He won the bowling award in his first year and finished well in the club's best and fairest. In 2009-2010, Mick was made captain of Coburg's First XI Men's Side and led the team to a VSDCA Premiership and Championship. Mick was recognised as the Coburg's Club Champion this year, also winning the batting and bowling awards.

At 36 years of age, Lewis was called up to play for the Retravision Warriors in the 2010–11 KFC Twenty20 Big Bash. Mick played in all 6 games for Western Australia's in that series. He started brilliantly in the first game, taking a wicket with his first ball, bowling Tasmanian batsman Mark Cosgrove. He ended this game with figures of 3/46 from 4 overs and for the series he continued to take a total of 8 wickets at 25.5.

=== Ball tampering ===
In the 2015/16 Sheffield Shield final between South Australia and Victoria at Gliderol Oval, South Australia, Lewis was found guilty of ball tampering during South Australia's second innings. Batsman Mark Cosgrove hit a boundary near the Victorian bench; Lewis, coaching Victoria at the time, kicked the ball into the gutter beneath the fence on the boundary, raking the ball across the concrete while picking it up. Victoria were penalised 5 runs, and Lewis was subsequently charged and fined $2,266 - equal to 50 per cent of a player's match fee.
