= Andrew Hall =

South African cricketer

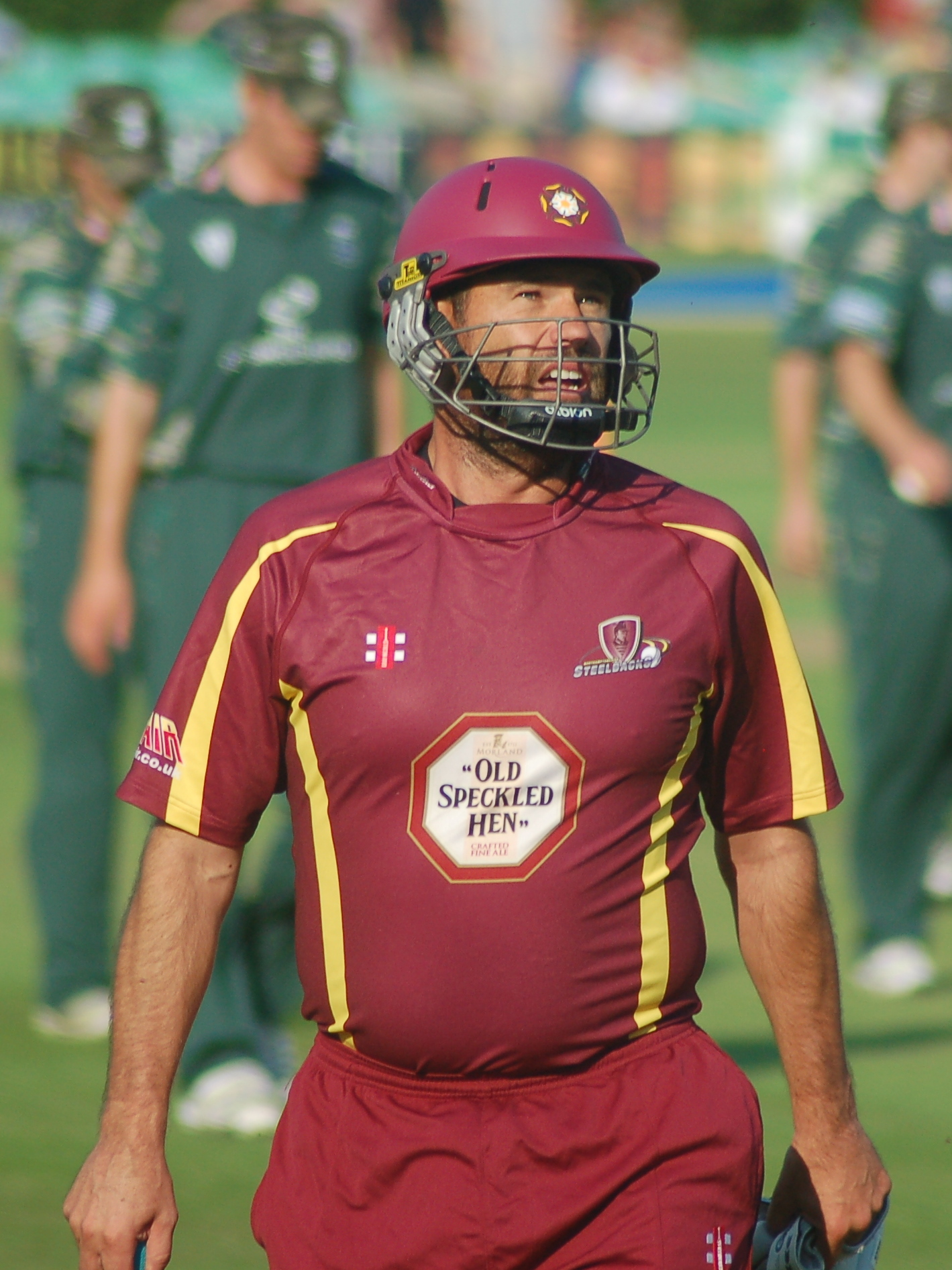

Personal information
- Full name: Andrew James Hall
- Born: 31 July 1975 (age 51); Johannesburg, Transvaal Province, South Africa
- Batting: Right-handed
- Bowling: Right-arm fast-medium
- Role: All-rounder

International information
- National side: South Africa (1999–2007)
- Test debut (cap 284): 8 March 2002 v Australia
- Last Test: 26 January 2007 v Pakistan
- ODI debut (cap 54): 27 January 1999 v West Indies
- Last ODI: 1 July 2007 v India
- ODI shirt no.: 99
- T20I debut (cap 15): 9 January 2006 v Australia
- Last T20I: 24 February 2006 v Australia

Domestic team information
- Years: Team
- 1995/96–2000/01: Transvaal/Gauteng
- 1999: Durham Cricket Board
- 2001/02–2003/04: Easterns
- 2002: Suffolk
- 2003–2004: Worcestershire
- 2003/04: Titans
- 2004/05–2005/06: Lions
- 2005–2007: Kent
- 2006/07–2009/10: Dolphins
- 2008–2014: Northamptonshire (squad no. 1)
- 2009/10: North West
- 2010/11–2011/12: Mashonaland Eagles (squad no. 7)

Career statistics
| Competition | Test | ODI | FC | LA |
|---|---|---|---|---|
| Matches | 21 | 88 | 242 | 318 |
| Runs scored | 760 | 905 | 11,072 | 5,990 |
| Batting average | 26.20 | 21.04 | 35.26 | 29.80 |
| 100s/50s | 1/3 | 0/3 | 15/66 | 6/33 |
| Top score | 163 | 81 | 163 | 129* |
| Balls bowled | 3,001 | 3,341 | 36,355 | 12,616 |
| Wickets | 45 | 95 | 639 | 365 |
| Bowling average | 35.93 | 26.47 | 27.88 | 27.59 |
| 5 wickets in innings | 0 | 1 | 17 | 2 |
| 10 wickets in match | 0 | 0 | 1 | 0 |
| Best bowling | 3/1 | 5/18 | 6/77 | 5/18 |
| Catches/stumpings | 16/– | 29/– | 228/– | 92/1 |
- Source: ESPNcricinfo, 18 August 2017

Andrew James Hall (born 31 July 1975) is a former South African first-class cricketer who played from 1999 until 2011. He played as an all-rounder who bowled fast-medium pace and has been used as both an opening batsman and in the lower order. He was born in Johannesburg in South Africa in 1975 and educated at Hoërskool Alberton in Alberton, Gauteng.

Prior to making it on the South African first-class cricket scene he played indoor cricket for South Africa. He broke through in 1995/96 and has played for Transvaal, Gauteng, and Easterns.

Internationally, Hall was initially thought of solely as a limited overs cricket specialist and made his ODI debut against the West Indies at Durban in 1999. He was a regular in the ODI team until 2007, taking part in South Africa's 2003 Cricket World Cup squad and the 2007 Cricket World Cup. He appeared in the Test team sporadically and made his debut in 2002 against Australia at Cape Town. Batting at number 8, he scored 70 but did not pick up any wickets in the match.

He retired from international cricket in September 2007 but continued to play domestic cricket in both South Africa and England until 2014.

== International career ==
During the 2003 England tour he received a late call-up to the South African squad and impressed with 16 wickets in the Test series. He scored a match-winning 99 not out at Headingley and became the 5th batsman in Test cricket to have been stranded one short of a hundred.

In 2004, due to the absence of the recently retired Gary Kirsten and non-touring Herschelle Gibbs, he was promoted to open the batting in the Test series against India. He reacted to the added responsibility by scoring 163 at Kanpur – his maiden Test century. The century was made against the likes of Anil Kumble and Harbhajan Singh, batting for almost ten hours.

He holds the World Record 8th wicket stand in ODI cricket of 138 with Justin Kemp, made against India in November 2006. His contribution was an unbeaten 56 from 47 balls and he went on to take 3 wickets in the second innings.

During the 2007 Cricket World Cup in the West Indies he took his maiden 5 wicket haul (5/18) against England on 17 April at the Kensington Oval, Bridgetown, Barbados.

=== International retirement ===
Hall retired from international cricket in September 2007. Whilst not giving a reason for his decision, Graham Ford – Hall's coach at Kent – speculated it was due to his omission from the 2007 Twenty20 World Championship squad, saying:

I can only assume that he was reacting to the bitter disappointment of being left out of the World Cup [Championship] squad.

== County career ==
Hall played for Durham Cricket Board in the 1999 NatWest Trophy, his first experience in English County Cricket. He played one List A match for Suffolk in the 2002 Cheltenham & Gloucester Trophy whilst playing for Rawtenstall in the Lancashire League. This was Halls only appearance in any form of cricket for Suffolk. He then played his first senior English cricket for Worcestershire in the 2003 and 2004 English seasons.

Hall moved to play for Kent from 2005 to 2007, playing parts of each season when not appearing for the South African team. He returned to England in 2008 when he signed for Northamptonshire as a Kolpak player. While playing for Northants he set a record for the team's best Twenty20 bowling figures, taking 6/21 against Worcestershire in 2008. He also achieved his best Twenty20 batting performance in the same game (66 not out). He became captain of the county in 2010 after fellow South African Nicky Boje resigned, remaining captain until after the 2012 season when he was replaced by Stephen Peters. During his tenure as captain he nearly led Northants to promotion in the County Championship.

Hall continued to play for Northants until the end of the 2014 season when he was not offered a new contract. He announced his retirement from professional cricket shortly afterwards.

== Personal life ==
After retiring, Hall became a sports teacher at Milton Keynes Preparatory School.

Hall was the victim of a robbery at an automatic teller machine in 1999 during which he was shot in his left hand. The mugger is said to have fired six shots at him. In 2002, he was driven around in his own car with a gun pointed to his head.
