= Australian cricket team in England in 2005 =

The Australia national cricket team landed in England on 6 June 2005. Over the course of the summer, they played one Twenty20 International, a triangular ODI tournament with both Bangladesh and England, a one-day tournament with England, and five Test matches, the outcome of which would decide The Ashes. With Australia the top-ranked team in the World Test table, and England the second-ranked, this was the most eagerly anticipated Ashes series since the 1980s.

== Warm-up matches ==
Australia won their first two warm-up games, a Twenty20 game against the PCA Masters XI at Arundel and a 50-over game against Leicestershire emphatically. However, the tide turned as they lost their next matches, firstly by 100 runs against England in a Twenty20 game, followed by a remarkable defeat to Somerset in a very high scoring match at Taunton.

== One-day International series ==
The first international matches scheduled were as part of the Natwest Series against England and Bangladesh. In their first match, Australia lost to Bangladesh by five wickets in the last over, perhaps the biggest upset in recent memory. Just before that game Andrew Symonds was dropped for disciplinary reasons. The following day, Australia lost their second match in a row to England, due mainly to Kevin Pietersen's late batting onslaught. However, Australia remained undefeated throughout the rest of the series to tie a thrilling final against England at Lord's.

Australia's next tournament was a three match Natwest Challenge One-day International tournament against England. Despite losing the first match, they bounced back to take the series 2–1. After a drawn three-day match against Leicestershire, the main part of the tour – the Tests against England for The Ashes – were about to start.

== The Ashes Tests ==
With all the hype preceding Australia's arrival in England, especially Glenn McGrath's assertion that Australia would win 5–0, many people expected a good, tight contest, although Australia's fans predicted a clear overall victory. English fans were quietly confident that their strong run – winning 15 and drawing two of their last 18 Test matches – would continue and they could at least stand up to Australia, having lost the last eight Ashes series.

=== First Test ===
What followed surprised everyone – England's hostile pace bowling ripped through Australia in the first Test, reducing them to 190 all out. However, Australia replied in style by skittling England for 155, with only Pietersen – playing in his Test debut – able to resist. During this innings, McGrath took his 500th Test wicket. Australia then fared considerably better in their second innings to win the first Test by 239 runs.

=== Second Test ===
After another drawn three-day match, this time against Worcestershire, came a pivotal moment of the series. While warming up for the second Test at Edgbaston, McGrath injured his ankle stepping on a cricket ball and was unable to play in the Test. At the last moment, Michael Kasprowicz was included in the team, but Australia had lost their bowling spearhead.

Having won the toss, the Australian captain, Ricky Ponting, decided to bowl first on a pitch suited for batting. England batted quickly and aggressively, scoring over 400 runs on the first day. England finished with a 99 run lead after the first innings, and although the Australians put up a fighting tail-end batting display on the fourth day (they needed 107 runs with only two wickets in hand at the end of the third day), England held on to win by two runs – the closest runs victory in Ashes history.

=== Third Test ===
The third Test match was held at Old Trafford, and again England took a large first innings lead, the England innings notable for Shane Warne taking his 600th Test wicket and Michael Vaughan scoring the first century of the series. Glenn McGrath had also returned from injury, returning the Australian side to full strength. Due to rain delays, the Australian first innings did not finish until the fourth day.

England then set about scoring quickly in their second innings (with the aim of declaring and bowling Australia out to win), setting Australia 423 to win with only a day and 10 overs remaining. Ricky Ponting batted for seven hours on the final day to score the first Australian century of the series, but was dismissed with only four overs left and Australia's last two batsmen facing them. Brett Lee and Glenn McGrath managed to hang on for those four overs to salvage a draw for Australia, with England unable to take the last wicket.

Australia then played a two-day match against Northants, a drawn match in which Australia opted for batting practice instead of trying to force the win.

=== Fourth Test ===
For the second time in less than a month, Glenn McGrath was ruled out of a test due to injury – this time with elbow problems. Australia also dropped Jason Gillespie from their side after taking just three wickets so far in the series. In contrast, England remained with their original starting XI from the first Test. They carried on their first innings form with their best of the series (477 all out), before England's bowlers managed to swing the ball prodigiously to leave Australia at 99/5 and 175/9. Despite the best efforts of Brett Lee, Australia finished 259 runs behind England and were asked to follow-on – for the first time in 17 years. However, with the need to bowl for two innings in a row, Simon Jones, England's best swing bowler, started showing signs of injury and was taken to hospital for a scan on his ankle. Australia were then able to post a target for England to chase, but on a wearing pitch with Shane Warne getting large amounts of turn, England struggled in their pursuit of 129, winning by three wickets in the end.

Australia then played a two-day match against Essex, in which Essex reached 500 in the first day before declaring, while Australia reached 500 on the second day. The match finished in a high-scoring draw, as no team was able to dismiss the other twice.

=== Fifth Test ===
For the first time in the series, England made a change to their side – Simon Jones' ankle injury meant that England needed to replace him. With England 2–1 up with one to play, Australia needed a victory to level the series (and thus retain the Ashes). With this in mind, England decided to call up Paul Collingwood, an all-rounder and England's best fielder, rather than a like-for-like bowler.

England won the toss and elected to bat, reaching 373 in their first innings. Matthew Hayden and Justin Langer then batted through to the end of the second day, coming off for bad light before the scheduled close of play. With Australia needing to force the victory, many were surprised at this move.

The third day was also affected by rain and bad light, with only half of the scheduled overs being bowled. Australia again came off early for bad light, but as they were only 96 runs behind England and still had eight wickets in hand, they were possibly hoping to establish a significant lead and bowl England out cheaply.

An Australian collapse after lunch on the fourth day meant England were actually leading by six runs after the first innings. With Australia needing to dismiss England and score more runs than them, England merely had to bat for as long as possible, denying Australia the time needed to force victory. Thanks to Kevin Pietersen's maiden Test century on the fifth day, and Paul Collingwood batting patiently for 10 runs in 51 minutes in the second innings, Australia were left with a target of 342 runs with only 19 overs remaining in the day. With Steve Harmison opening the bowling for England, Australia were offered the light in the first over of their second innings and accepted, leaving Rudi Koertzen and Billy Bowden to remove the bails at 18:17 BST to signal a drawn match and the series victory for England.

During the presentations, Pietersen was voted man of the match for his innings of 158, while Andrew Flintoff and Shane Warne received the "Man of the Series" awards, nominated by the opposing team coaches (Duncan Fletcher for England and John Buchanan for Australia). In addition, Flintoff was awarded the inaugural Compton–Miller Medal for the overall "Man of the Series", nominated by the two chairmen of selectors, David Graveney and Trevor Hohns.

== Matches ==
=== Limited-overs games ===
==== PCA Masters XI v Australians (9 June) ====
The Australians beat the PCA Masters XI by 8 wickets

The 2005 Ashes tour started with the Australians taking on a Professional Cricketers' Association XI at the picturesque ground at Arundel in a Twenty20 game. A crowd of 11,000 turned up to see the tourists win with one ball to spare, although in practice the result was always clear after an opening partnership of 131 between Adam Gilchrist and Matthew Hayden. The Aussies got an ideal start as Stephen Fleming edged Brett Lee's first delivery to the slips and the Masters XI were 0 for 1, having been put in to bat by Australia. Darren Maddy made 70 in 57 balls and Paul Collingwood (38) and Mark Ealham (39) also scored runs, but the rest of the team made little impression as the PCA Masters XI made 167 for 6. The Aussies lost only two wickets in making their target. (Cricinfo scorecard)

==== Leicestershire v Australians (11 June) ====
The Australians beat Leicestershire by 95 runs

The Australians put in a strong performance at Grace Road, with Matthew Hayden making 107 off 96 balls, Damien Martyn 85 off 103 and Andrew Symonds 92 off 59 as they made a huge 321 for 4 off their 50 overs. 72 of their runs came off the final 5 overs. Leicestershire never threatened in reply, with Ottis Gibson, who came in at 8, the only man to make 50. Gibson had earlier taken two wickets for Leicestershire, who finished well short of the target on 226 for 8. (Cricinfo scorecard)

==== England v Australia (13 June) ====
13 June 2005
Scorecard

England; 179/8 (20 overs)	v	Australia; 79 (14.3 overs)
PD Collingwood 46 (26); GD McGrath 3/31 (4 overs)		JN Gillespie 24 (18); J Lewis 4/24 (4 overs)

England won by 100 runs
Rose Bowl, Southampton
Umpires: NJ Llong (Eng) and JW Lloyds (Eng)
Player of the match: KP Pietersen (Eng)

- England won the toss and elected to bat.

England started cautiously in the only Twenty20 International against Australia at the Rose Bowl, only hitting six runs off the first two overs as they saw off the bowlers, but Geraint Jones then decided to have fun with Brett Lee. Hitting two boundaries off the next over, Lee was hit for 14, and England moved rapidly to 28 for no loss before Jones cut McGrath to deep third man, where Kasprowicz took a catch on the boundary – out for 19 with four fours. Marcus Trescothick hit a single to end the over, but England were happy enough with 29 for 1 after four overs. Lee's next over was, again, hit for 14, as Lee served up one wide and a no-ball to end with three overs for 31 as singles were taken off every ball. That prompted a bowling change, with Michael Kasprowicz coming on for Australia, and with good reward, as the penultimate ball of his over was caught by Symonds at midwicket – Andrew Flintoff out for 6. Kevin Pietersen managed to scamper a single, and after six overs, England were 50 for 2.

With Jason Gillespie coming on, England continued to take the singles, although the fielding restrictions were off and Australia could stop more of those. However, Michael Clarke at deep backward point handed England three runs in the seventh over with a misfield. Pietersen continued to dominate the Australian bowling, smashing a four and a two off Gillespie, as England took ten runs off the eighth over. Australia looked clueless – a rare sight – as they continued to give runs away through misfields, and Kevin Pietersen smashed his way to 33 not out off 16 balls – after 10 overs, England were 93 for 2, and looking to set a massive target.

The Australian captain Ricky Ponting brought on part-time spinner Michael Clarke to bowl the 11th over, and got immediate success, when Pietersen launched him to Matthew Hayden on the fifth ball, but England were still 101 for 3 after 11 overs. In the next over, the new batsman Michael Vaughan edged Andrew Symonds' ball to midwicket, and the pressure was suddenly on the English. With Trescothick out for 41 a bit later to an attempted sweep off Symonds, England were suddenly looking down a hole after a fine start, and Andrew Strauss and Paul Collingwood slowed the scoring, to see England 111 for 5 with six overs to play. However, a slog sweep from Collingwood to end the 15th over turned the match again, as it went away for six and England moved to 124 for 5. With Jason Gillespie being brought back, Collingwood led the charge, as England stole 17 runs off the 17th over and wrought control of the game again. Despite Andrew Strauss being bowled by Gillespie for 18, Collingwood hit another two boundaries towards the end of the over, to move onto 42 not out and the team score to 167 for 6. Vikram Solanki was out in the next over for 9, caught by Hussey off McGrath, and on the last ball, Collingwood was caught by for 46. Still, England would be pleased with 179 for 8, the highest score on the Rose Bowl in Twenty20 matches.

Australia started shakily, with Adam Gilchrist playing-and-missing and edging one shot over Andrew Strauss at third man, who miscued the path of the ball, as the Australians got eight off the first over bowled by Darren Gough. With Gilchrist finally taking one liberty too many, an easy catch was given, and Kevin Pietersen took it to remove arguably the most dangerous batsman in this format. On the next ball, Hayden was out, caught by Pietersen for 6. Symonds survived the next ball, but odds had improved for England, as the visitors were now 23 for 2. What followed was an Australian collapse – Michael Clarke went for a golden duck to Lewis, a slightly dubious decision, but that gave the English the needed momentum. Within the next four overs, Australia had lost four more wickets for eight runs, Symonds for 0, Hussey for 1, Ponting for 0, Martyn for 4, and despite a recovery from Jason Gillespie and Brett Lee, the required run rate ran away to 12 an over from the last 11 overs. Jon Lewis finished his spell with four wickets for 24 – a special international debut, even though it was only in a Twenty20 game. Despite a good recovery and a partnership of 36, Gillespie eventually holed out a catch to Marcus Trescothick off the hero of the match, Paul Collingwood, and England headed even further towards a victory. Eventually, McGrath was bowled by Harmison, ending the innings for 79 all out – exactly the same score that England succumbed to in the fourth innings chase against the Australians in the first Test of the last Ashes.

==== Somerset v Australians (15 June) ====
Somerset won by four wickets

Somerset shocked everyone with a nail-biting win over Australia at Taunton, their first win over the Australians since 1977. Somerset were placed mid-table in the second division of the National League, and no one believed they should have any chance against an Australian team only missing Adam Gilchrist. And Australia backed that up with the bat – Matthew Hayden retired after a fun hit-out for 76, captain Ricky Ponting the same for 80, and Australia tonked 342 for 5.

Graeme Smith and Sanath Jayasuriya, however, fought back for Somerset. The pair opened, and put on 197 for the first wicket in little over 20 overs – Smith smashing his way to a massive 68-ball hundred, ending with 108 with 17 fours and a six. Jayasuriya, not wishing to be worse, made a 77-ball ton – before getting out for 101 a bit later. The platform was set, however, and 24-year-old James Hildreth could steady the ship after Somerset had lost some wickets to part-time bowler Michael Hussey. Hildreth made 38 not out off 24 balls and saw them to a victory with 19 balls and four wickets to spare – more comfortable than the match looked for the most part. (Cricinfo scorecard)

==== Australia v Bangladesh (18 June) ====
18 June 2005
Scorecard

Australia; 249/5 (50 overs)	v	Bangladesh; 250/5 (49.2 overs)
DR Martyn 77 (112); Tapash Baisya 3/69 (10 overs)		Mohammad Ashraful 100 (101); JN Gillespie 2/41 (10 overs)

Bangladesh won by 5 wickets
Sophia Gardens, Cardiff
Umpires: BF Bowden (NZ) and DR Shepherd (Eng)
Player of the match: Mohammad Ashraful (Ban)

- Australia won the toss and elected to bat.

Perhaps, the biggest upset in the history of One Day Internationals, Mashrafe Mortaza shocked the Sophia Gardens crowd when he had Adam Gilchrist plumb on the second ball of the second ODI, taking the first Australian wicket without a run yet on the scoreboard – and it was to set the tone of the match. Most people would have expected Australia to swamp Bangladesh, especially after the 10-wicket defeat the Bangladeshi Tigers endured in the opening match with England, but a maiden from Mortaza gave them some hope, at least. Things looked to be going the right way for Australia when Matthew Hayden took a boundary off Tapash Baisya, but another maiden followed, and in the sixth over Ricky Ponting padded up to Tapash Baisya – resulting in an lbw decision given, and Australia were 9 for 2. Cautious batting from Hayden and Damien Martyn followed, but some expensive bowling from Baisya relinquished the initiative, as Australia recovered. They survived through 15 overs, Hayden being caught off a no-ball from Tapash, but in the 16th, he was bowled by Nazmul Hossain for 37 off an inside edge, just as Hayden were looking to get himself in. Some economical bowling from Mohammad Rafique who bowled ten overs for 31 runs, along with excellent bowling from Mortaza at the death, resulted in Australia finishing on 249 for 5, losing Martyn to Baisya for 77 and Clarke to the same man for 54. In fact, Michael Hussey with 31 not out off 21 balls and Simon Katich with 36 not out off 23 ensured that they got a competitive target.

That was not all, however. The chase began very sedately, only Tushar Imran looking to take runs as he smashed Brad Hogg about, but Hogg got his revenge when Tushar was out for 24, lofting to Katich. Earlier, Nafees Iqbal had gone for 8, and with Javed Omar out as the third man to fall, for 19 off 51 balls, it looked to be business as usual for Bangladesh. But this match had more tricks up its sleeve. Hogg and Clarke leaked runs like a drain, six wides were bowled, and Mohammad Ashraful showed another glimpse of why he's been called Bangladesh's finest batsman. As he made the second ODI hundred in the Bangladesh team's history, he forged a massive 130-run partnership with Habibul Bashar, and had a great two hours at the crease (although dropped on 54) – before picking out Jason Gillespie at long on to be out for exactly 100. Bangladesh still needed 23 runs off 17 balls, but Aftab Ahmed continued his fine form from the Oval match with England, as he first took a leg bye off Ashraful, then gave the strike to Rafique, who smashed a cover driven four before taking another leg bye. A four and a dot-ball finished a 10-run over, meaning that Bangladesh now needed only 13 off 12 balls. A good over from McGrath followed, as he conceded only six runs – including an edged four from Rafique. With the last over, Bangladesh needed seven runs, and Ahmed swung the first ball of the over to midwicket for six. Thus, it became a formality – Bangladesh won with four balls and five wickets to spare, almost convincing in today's cricket, and the result meant that the Aussies needed a victory over England at Bristol the following day to have any chance of winning the group stage.

==== England v Australia (19 June) ====
19 June 2005
Scorecard

Australia; 252/9 (50 overs)	v	England; 253/7 (47.3 overs)
MEK Hussey 84 (83); SJ Harmison 5/33 (10 overs)		KP Pietersen 91* (65); GB Hogg 3/42 (10 overs)

England won by 3 wickets
The County Ground, Bristol
Umpires: Aleem Dar (Pak) and JW Lloyds (Eng)
Player of the match: KP Pietersen (Eng)

- Australia won the toss and elected to bat.

Ricky Ponting chose to bat when he won the toss for the visiting Australian cricket team in an extremely tense and see-sawing match at The County Ground, Bristol. It looked like a great decision when Jon Lewis and Darren Gough were smashed about early on, as Australia made their way to 57 for 0 after 11 overs with Adam Gilchrist and Matthew Hayden taking sixes off Lewis over midwicket. However, with the entrance of Steve Harmison, everything changed. In his third over – the 12th of the game, he removed Gilchrist with a bouncy ball that the batsman edged behind, then Ponting with a yorker that he didn't play at – resulting in lbw – then a dot ball, and then Martyn with a slog shot to Pietersen at third man. Australia tried to consolidate, but when Hayden tried to hit out off Harmison four overs later, Paul Collingwood jumped up to pick the ball out of the air with his right hand – a magnificent catch, and Australia had lost four wickets for six runs, reminiscent of their collapse in the Twenty20 match earlier on in the week.

Australia dug themselves out of the hole, however, Michael Clarke and Michael Hussey slowly accumulating to increase the rate. England clearly lacked a fifth bowler, opting instead for Vikram Solanki to bat down the order, so they used a combination of Michael Vaughan, Solanki and Collingwood to get through their ten required overs. That let Australia off the hook, with Clarke and Hussey adding 105, before Jon Lewis – who had been taken to the cleaners earlier on – dug out Michael Clarke with an inside edge onto the stumps, taking the fifth wicket of the game at just the right time. Shane Watson accumulated well with Hussey, however, hitting six an over as Lewis was smashed about again, but Harmison got his revenge by completing his first five-wicket haul in ODIs as Hussey was beaten by a slower ball – the first time Hussey had been dismissed in One Day Internationals, for a batting average of 229. Then, Andrew Flintoff was brought back, getting a splendid yorker in for Watson, who was out for 25 just as the Aussies were preparing to hit out – the score 220 for 7 after 44.1 overs. Jason Gillespie and Brad Hogg survived a couple of overs from Flintoff and Harmison – meaning that Harmison finished with five for 33 off ten overs. Towards the end, Australia built up again, before losing Gillespie to a top edge, but 244 for 8 with seven balls remaining still looked difficult for England to chase. Gough dug out Michael Kasprowicz with a yorker with two balls to spare, and four legbyes ended the innings to take Australia to 252 for 9.

England started positively in reply, taking 39 off the first 34 legal deliveries (while Gillespie served up four wides and a no-ball in his first over), but Glenn McGrath took revenge by serving up a good yorker to have Marcus Trescothick bowled for 16. Two overs later, Andrew Strauss went in identical fashion, and Vaughan and Collingwood were forced to consolidate. They did, although in jerky fashion, Collingwood eventually falling to Kasprowicz and Flintoff mistiming a hit off Hogg to see England into a spot of bother at 119 for 4 after 27.2 overs, with Vaughan and Kevin Pietersen at the crease. Edges and runs followed, but when England lost Vaughan and Geraint Jones in quick succession, and were 93 short with only 74 deliveries left, it looked dark for England. Pietersen then upped the ante. Smashing runs to all corners, especially off Gillespie, he reached his fifty off 46 balls, and then took 19 more deliveries to bring up an additional 41 runs – although surviving an extremely close run-out decision near the 40th over. A level headed 7 not out from Lewis – making up somewhat for his bowling – ensured the English were home by three wickets and 15 deliveries – and the Australians had only managed two points from their first two matches, while England had gained 11.

==== England v Australia (23 June) ====
23 June 2005
Scorecard

Australia; 266/5 (50 overs)	v	England; 209/9 (50 overs)
A Symonds 73 (81); A Flintoff 2/55 (10 overs)		D Gough 46 (47); GB Hogg 2/19 (6 overs)

Australia won by 57 runs
Riverside Ground, Chester-le-Street
Umpires: Aleem Dar (Pak) and MR Benson (Eng)
Player of the match: A Symonds (Aus)

- England won the toss and elected to field.

Australia squared the ODI series by winning a game where England missed their captain Michael Vaughan due to injury. Marcus Trescothick, the stand-in captain, won the toss and decided to chase at the Riverside Ground, thus giving his own side the task of batting under floodlights. Chris Tremlett who had made an impressive debut against Bangladesh, struggled early on with his line and length, and the Australian openers Matthew Hayden and Adam Gilchrist punished him for runs. In his fifth over, however, Tremlett got a breakthrough, Gilchrist mistiming a cut and Geraint Jones taking the catch behind. However, Ricky Ponting did not toss his wicket away early, leaving it to Hayden to hit the runs, and at the end of 15 overs the Australians were 73 for 1. Andrew Flintoff and Steve Harmison, the change bowlers, kept the pressure up on the batsmen, however, not letting too many runs away even though they bowled the occasional wide, and they could reap the rewards with two quick wickets, Ponting for 27 and Hayden for 39, and people began to remember the last ODI between the sides.

However, this time there was no collapse. Two no-balls from Harmison followed, Andrew Symonds and Damien Martyn defended well, waiting for Harmison and Flintoff to be taken off and saved for the last overs. They were – and Australia were let off the hook. Symonds and Martyn paired up for 142 runs, taking runs off every bowler – even Flintoff and Harmison – and batted together for nearly 25 overs, with a partnership run-rate of nearly 6. The first four overs only yielded 13 runs, but when Harmison was taken off England lost the sting. Symonds was finally run out by the skipper Trescothick for 73, a hopeless attempt at taking a single, and Flintoff dug out Michael Hussey for 5 two overs later. Australia, however, made a highly competitive 266 for 5, and in the seaming conditions one would expect it to be enough.

As it turned out, it was. Brett Lee, opening the bowling for Australia, started off with a maiden over to Trescothick, and England struggled to get off the mark, being four for no wicket after three overs. Another maiden from Glenn McGrath followed, and then Andrew Strauss departed with an inside edge off Lee. In the next over, Trescothick was gone for a 15-ball duck, to an away-swinger from McGrath, and two balls later Paul Collingwood gave a massive inside-edge onto his stumps – England were six for three, and staring down the barrel.

A rescue operation from Andrew Flintoff and Vikram Solanki followed, pairing up for 79 before Solanki was caught at midwicket off Brad Hogg. Then, Flintoff was nearly stumped off Hogg's bowling, only to give a catch at long on later on in the over for 44. With England at 94 for 5, they needed seven and a half runs an over, with Kevin Pietersen and Geraint Jones at the crease. However, even Pietersen could not save them this time, as he was caught in the deep off Symonds for 19, and the rest of the match just became a task to bat out 50 overs. Thanks to Darren Gough, who made 46 not out (ironically, the top score of the innings), and a level-headed 11 not out from Steve Harmison, England made that, but lost by 57 runs – thus also losing the bonus point.

==== Australia v Bangladesh (25 June) ====
25 June 2005
Scorecard

Bangladesh; 139 (35.2 overs)	v	Australia; 140/0 (19 overs)
Mohammad Ashraful 58 (86); A Symonds 5/18 (7.2 overs)		ML Hayden 66* (54)

Australia won by 10 wickets
Old Trafford, Manchester
Umpires: BF Bowden (NZ) and JW Lloyds (Eng)
Player of the match: A Symonds (Aus)

- Australia won the toss and elected to field.

Australia recorded a thumping 10-wicket win over Bangladesh to level their head-to-head record in the NatWest Series to 1–1. Under leaden skies at Old Trafford, Ricky Ponting made the wise decision and chose to bowl, and short-balls from Brett Lee immediately had the Bangladeshis worried. They survived six overs without loss before Javed Omar was trapped by an in-swinger for a 20-ball 3. Tushar Imran was next to fall to Lee, and many expected a procession to begin, but Shahriar Nafees and Mohammad Ashraful gave the crowd a treat with some special strokes. Ashraful had two top-edged sixes, as Lee was dispatched for 20 runs in the 11th over. By the drinks break after 15 overs, Bangladesh were 76 for 2, having added 53 from the last 39 balls. Ponting, however, brought on the spinners Brad Hogg and Andrew Symonds, who both got a fair amount of turn out of the Old Trafford pitch, and Symonds had Shahriar bowled for 47 with a yorker that he played late to. The next ball, he got the out-of-form captain Habibul Bashar, and the wickets began to tumble quickly. Symonds got five wickets for 18 runs, Hogg three for 29, Bangladesh collapsed from 137 for 6 (when Khaled Mashud was bowled by Hogg) to 139 all out in three overs, as Ashraful went for 58 and no one else really offering any resistance to the slow Australian bowlers.

Bangladesh had Adam Gilchrist in some trouble early on, especially through fast bowler Mashrafe Mortaza, who had him beaten several times in the opening overs, but Matthew Hayden was imposing at the crease, punishing the inevitable bad balls from Nazmul Hossain who was taken off after three overs, having conceded 29 runs. However, no one could stop the rot, Hayden and Gilchrist taking runs at will after a while to see Australia to the target inside 20 overs. Australia thus closed the gap to England to three points, as the situation indicated by the ICC rankings before the series became more and more possible – that Bangladesh were to be whipping boys and England and Australia would go through.

==== England v Australia (28 June) ====
28 June 2005
Scorecard

Australia; 261/9 (50 overs)	v	England; 37/1 (6 overs)
A Symonds 74 (75); D Gough 3/70 (9 overs)		AJ Strauss 25 (18); GD McGrath 1/24 (3 overs)

No result
Edgbaston, Birmingham
Umpires: BF Bowden (NZ) and DR Shepherd (Eng)
Player of the match: Not awarded

- Australia won the toss and elected to bat.
- Rain interrupted England's innings after three overs, and then again after six, resulting in an abandoned match

The eighth match of the NatWest Series eventually became an anti-climax, but for large parts of the match it wasn't – despite the fact that both teams had qualified for the final before the last game. Ricky Ponting won the toss and chose to send his openers in – and they took advantage. Darren Gough was innocuous, conceding 23 runs in his first two overs, prompting a bowling change in the fifth over, sending Steve Harmison on. Meanwhile, Simon Jones got some swing with the new ball – and, yet again in this series, Adam Gilchrist was caught behind off a swing bowler, out for 19. Shortly afterwards, Jones tried to throw the ball back at the wicketkeeper as Matthew Hayden pushed it back to him, but Jones hit Hayden with the balls, and a few words were exchanged – Paul Collingwood joining in the fray as well.

However, the match got on, Jones and Harmison putting on the pressure and eventually having Hayden lbw on 14 – after he had failed to score from the last 11 deliveries. Damien Martyn then faced five dot-balls, and Jones served up a wicket maiden, and Australia were at 46 for 2 at the end of the tenth over. However, that was as good as it got for England. Andrew Flintoff dug out skipper Ricky Ponting for 34, but it mattered little, as Martyn and Andrew Symonds took advantage of the bowling. Michael Vaughan tried to put himself on, but Symonds smashed him over midwicket for six – the first of the match, displaying the despair. With some no-balls from Gough, and Simon Jones getting smashed early on, Australia were 220 for 4 after 42 overs, and looked on course for 300. However, the run-out of Symonds for 74 changed the course of the innings. Michael Clarke departed for three, a good catch by Geraint Jones behind the stumps, and Harmison then served up a wicket-maiden in the 46th over, of all things. With Brad Hogg and Jason Gillespie giving soft catches to Gough, that redeemed his figures somewhat, but he still conceded 70 runs. The last over from Flintoff was very good, however, conceding only three runs with yorkers directed at the feet of the batsmen, and Australia had to be content with 261 for 9.

England's chase was interrupted once by rain, after three overs, when they were eight for 0, but coming back they were set 200 to win in 33 overs. That was never possible – rain started again after three more overs – and when Andrew Strauss fell the umpires decided that play was no longer possible, and a no-result was declared.

==== Australia v Bangladesh (30 June) ====
30 June 2005
Scorecard

Bangladesh; 250/8 (50 overs)	v	Australia; 254/4 (48.1 overs)
Shahriar Nafees 75 (116); SR Watson 3/43 (10 overs)		MJ Clarke 80* (104); Mashrafe Mortaza 2/44 (9 overs)

Australia won by 6 wickets
St Lawrence Ground, Canterbury
Umpires: Aleem Dar (Pak) and JW Lloyds (Eng)
Player of the match: Shahriar Nafees (Ban)

- Australia won the toss and elected to field.

The last game of the round robin of the NatWest Series was, as expected, won by the Australians. However, it summed up the improvement Bangladesh had made over the tour of England. In the first international, they were rolled over meekly by a no-balling, rusty English side – twice. In the last, Brett Lee and Jason Gillespie put the pressure on early, and with the aid of Shane Watson had them on the reels with 75 for 5. Yet, Bangladesh recovered to post 250 for 8, and were theoretically in with a chance for most of the game. Yet, they started very, very shakily. Javed Omar was dropped by Matthew Hayden in the third over, only to be out to Jason Gillespie in the next for an eight-ball duck – a disappointing end to a fine series for the Bangladeshi. Brett Lee had both Tushar Imran and Mohammad Ashraful beaten with full deliveries, Bangladesh were 19 for three wickets down – an all too familiar position.

A quickfire 30 from captain Habibul Bashar helped to take away some of the jitters, as Bashar took 16 runs off a Brett Lee over, but a bouncer from Shane Watson wasn't successfully evaded, and Adam Gilchrist could take the catch. Aftab Ahmed had to settle for 7, and it was down to the last two recognised batsmen – Shahriar Nafees, who had quietly moved his way to 25 not out, and wicketkeeper Khaled Mashud. However, the two put on an almost faultless partnership of 94, taking their time to consolidate. Shahriar eventually departed for 75, edging a short ball from Shane Watson to the wicket-keeper – the usual method of dismissal. However, their partnership had given Bangladesh hope, and Mohammad Rafique took advantage with a six off Watson. Despite two more wickets falling – Rafique and Khaled Mahmud (caught at mid-on on the last ball) – Bangladesh had recovered to 250 for 8, which could potentially be tricky to chase.

Mashrafe Mortaza was hit around for 12 in the first over, however, and the momentum swung towards Australia. Mortaza hit back by inducing an outside edge from Matthew Hayden to wicketkeeper Mashud for 1, and four balls later a ball from Mortaza hit captain Ricky Ponting on the pads – but too high to be given out. Gilchrist and Ponting paired up well, however, even though Gilchrist rode his luck with a few drives in the air, but in the tenth over he gave a somewhat dubious catch to slip Khaled Mahmud, and was gone for 45 – all while rain threatened to damage the match. However, the weather gradually improved, along with Australia's chances – after 15 overs, they were 83 for three, having lost Damien Martyn for 9, but only needed slightly less than five an over. However, economical bowling and riskless batting from Australia saw Bangladesh in with a chance again. Ponting and Michael Clarke let the run rate go to more than six an over, but Khaled Mahmud's bowling at the death to Andrew Symonds left a bit to be desired, as Australia could take the necessary runs and win by 11 balls and six wickets to spare. A Bangladeshi – Shahriar Nafees – got the Man of the Match award, possibly for his effort to keep the match exciting after Bangladesh had crumbled to 75 for 5.

==== England v Australia (2 July) ====
2 July 2005
Scorecard

Australia; 196 (48.5 overs)	v	England; 196/9 (50 overs)
MEK Hussey 62* (81); A Flintoff 3/23 (8 overs)		GO Jones 71 (100); GD McGrath 3/25 (10 overs)

Match tied
Lord's, London
Umpires: BF Bowden (NZ) and DR Shepherd (Eng)
Player of the match: GO Jones (Eng)

- England won the toss and elected to field.

The final of the NatWest Series ended in an anticlimax for the visitors, but throughout it gave entertainment to the crowd – despite being a relatively low-scoring game. It didn't look to be low-scoring early on, though, as Adam Gilchrist and Matthew Hayden punished the England opening bowlers Darren Gough and Simon Jones to be 50 for 0 after 6.3 overs. Two balls later, Hayden went for one expansive stroke too many – driving to Ashley Giles at mid-off for 17. England captain Michael Vaughan brought his change bowlers on, first Andrew Flintoff for Jones (who had been taken for 29 runs in his first three overs) and then Steve Harmison.

Those changes turned the match on its head. Instead of the Australian batsmen taking easy runs off the English bowlers, the English bowlers now tied down the batting, getting rewards in the form of wickets. Gilchrist gave a catch to Kevin Pietersen at short leg for 27, and when Harmison was brought on a couple of overs later, he immediately got a wicket – of Ricky Ponting for 7, and Australia were 71 for 3 after 12.1 overs. Damien Martyn and Andrew Symonds decided to retreat into their shell, as the English bowling turned from difficult to almost unhittable, Flintoff getting a touch on the off-stump of Symonds, but the bail didn't fall off, so he survived. However, the pair could only add 19 from 35 deliveries, before Harmison had Martyn caught behind with a ball that moved away from the batsman, off the waiting edge and into Geraint Jones' gloves.

Following the dismissal of Martyn, Vaughan brought back Jones – realising that Australia were reluctant to hit runs and thus allowing Jones to get through his overs without causing as much damage as he did early on. In fact, he and Harmison were part of a remarkable streak – they served up 28 successive dot-balls to Symonds and Michael Clarke (who bowed under to the pressure and was hit on the pad, out lbw for a 19-ball two). However, Michael Hussey – facing his first ball at 93 for 5 after 25 overs – took control of Jones, and when Harmison was taken off, Australia were let off the hook.

Symonds and Hussey batted out 15 overs, but Symonds struggled to hit runs and eventually smashed a drive to Andrew Strauss, who took a grateful catch, thus ending Symonds' innings for 29 – off 71 balls, a good innings in Test cricket but in ODI cricket virtually useless. Michael Vaughan then used a strange bowling change, keeping spinner Ashley Giles on for an over more than required and thus borrowing one from Andrew Flintoff who wasn't allowed to bowl a full ten. In the event, it mattered little. Flintoff had ample time to rip out Brett Lee and Jason Gillespie, and, with Harmison taking care of Brad Hogg and Glenn McGrath committing batting suicide with a shot not exactly out of the textbook, Australia were all out for 196 – and England were comfortably in the drivers' seat.

That was before they got in to bat, however. England survived the first three overs, bowled by McGrath and Lee, without loss. From then on, however, the English lost wickets by the bucketful. England went from 11 for 0 to 19 for 4 in the space of four overs, as the bowlers put the pressure on immediately, and their entire top-order came and went for single-figure scores. Paul Collingwood and Andrew Flintoff survived for a couple more overs, before Flintoff edged McGrath to slip – the score 33 for 5, and England should see themselves lucky to bat out 50 overs – or even score 100 runs. Collingwood and Geraint Jones decided to wait, giving McGrath maiden overs (as he finished his first bowling spell with figures of 7–4–9–3), and despite the batsmen being rapped on the pads, they survived, even taking the occasional six off Jason Gillespie.

After 25 overs, England were 65 for 5, but the Australian spinners didn't get too much out of the track. Dot-balls flourished, but the partnership kept in there, and a second six – from Jones off Hogg – showed their intent. After 35 overs, England were 113 for 5, and required a run a ball, with four overs of Lee and three of McGrath still to negotiate. However, England kept pushing, never letting the run-rate get above 7. Skipper Ponting showed some desperation when he brought Michael Hussey on with nine overs to spare, knowing that the spinners couldn't keep it tight, but got his reward in Hussey's second over when Collingwood was run out for 53 – off 116 balls.

Then Geraint Jones smacked two fours off Hussey to end the over, meaning that England needed 39 off 36 balls. Five balls later, a miscued sweep off Hogg hit Geraint Jones on the pads – gone for 71 – and England only had three wickets to spare. Two more balls were delivered before that tally was cut down to two – Hussey bowled Simon Jones for a two-ball one, so with Gough and Giles in, England needed 35 off 29 balls. Despite taking the runs off Hussey, Brett Lee's 47th over only yielded a single, as his variations of length turned out to be just the thing. However, Ponting now needed another over from either Hussey, Hogg or Symonds – deciding to use Hussey, he was punished, as Giles hit twos to both the off and leg side, and a wide from Hussey resulting in a nine-run over. Lee then came back on, and with his short ball had Giles playing a definitely unorthodox stroke – a sliced edge over Gilchrist's head for four.

Singles were taken to end the over, but McGrath was to bowl the last over of the game, with England still needing ten to win. Things got easier for England when McGrath overstepped with the first ball of the over, Gough making contact and running the single to cut the target by two – the no-ball for overstepping and the run single – and the no-ball meant McGrath still had to bowl six balls in the over. Giles then played and missed, before hitting a single, and then Gough drove the two next balls to cover for two. Suddenly, England only needed three off two – and were, incredibly, in a winning position again. But Gough's next shot was right back to McGrath, who took it up well and tossed it at the stumps, running out Gough and meaning that McGrath would bowl to Ashley Giles – and England still required three to win. The ball hit Giles' pads, ran away down the off side, and Giles and Harmison ran all they could to scamper two leg byes – and tie the game.

==== England v Australia (7 July) ====
7 July 2005
Scorecard

Australia; 219/7 (50 overs)	v	England; 221/1 (46 overs)
MEK Hussey 46* (52); PD Collingwood 4/34 (10 overs)		ME Trescothick 104* (134); GB Hogg 1/30 (6 overs)

England won by 9 wickets
Headingley, Leeds
Umpires: MR Benson (Eng) and RE Koertzen (SA)
Player of the match: ME Trescothick (Eng)

- England won the toss and elected to field.

England were lucky to win the toss and get a chance to bowl under cloudy skies at Headingley, as they beat Australia by nine wickets to take their second victory in five ODIs so far. Putting Australia in to bat, they didn't get immediate reward – as especially Darren Gough was smashed about by Adam Gilchrist, but the run rate at least stayed around four an over. And with Steve Harmison and Andrew Flintoff removing the openers in successive overs, things looked brighter for the English. Ricky Ponting and Damien Martyn added 39 for the next wicket, but in 11 overs, all while the English captain Michael Vaughan set attacking fields according to the new power play rules.

England all-rounder Paul Collingwood came on as third-change bowler, and used the helpful conditions to incite Ponting's demise, as Kevin Pietersen held a catch to dismiss the Australian captain for 14, and Collingwood continued to end with four wickets for 34 runs, as Australia slumped from 107 for 2 to 159 for 6 – all wickets courtesy of Collingwood. However, Michael Hussey showed his skills from number seven yet again, as he made a 52-ball 46 – while the ball was still moving around due to the cloud cover – and lifted Australia to 219 for 7.

The English reply was initially jittery. The pace of Brett Lee and accuracy of Glenn McGrath shook the English opening batsmen Marcus Trescothick and Andrew Strauss. Trescothick, for example, was caught off a no-ball from Lee, but survived, as the openers lasted nearly 25 overs – before Strauss was caught behind off Brad Hogg for 41. By that time, however, the sun had come out, the ball didn't swing much in the air, and as Lee kept on bowling no-balls – seven in total – things simply wouldn't work out for Australia. Trescothick used 132 balls to bring up his century, skipper Michael Vaughan made a healthy contribution with 59 not out, and England brought up the winning total with four overs to spare.

==== England v Australia (10 July) ====
10 July 2005
Scorecard

England; 223/8 (50 overs)	v	Australia; 224/3 (44.2 overs)
A Flintoff 87 (112); B Lee 5/41 (10 overs)		RT Ponting 111 (115); AF Giles 1/38 (10 overs)

Australia won by 7 wickets
Lord's, London
Umpires: RE Koertzen (SA) and JW Lloyds (Eng)
Player of the match: B Lee (Aus)

- Australia won the toss and elected to field.

Australia’s captain, Ricky Ponting, had struggled during the series against England, with a highest score of 34 in five innings and a batting average of 16.40, including the no-result at Edgbaston. However, on a batsman-friendly pitch at Lord’s, he returned to form, leading Australia to victory and leveling the NatWest Challenge.

It started well for Australia, too. Including Michael Kasprowicz in the squad and gambling on winning the toss and subbing one of their bowlers off, they won it – and Kasprowicz got immediate reward. After the English openers had survived the opening overs of McGrath and Lee to be 25 for 0 after eight overs, Kasprowicz was brought on, and Strauss chopped an inside edge onto his own stumps. Nine balls and three runs later, captain Michael Vaughan was hit on the pads by an inswinging delivery from Glenn McGrath and was out for 1. Marcus Trescothick and Kevin Pietersen soon followed to the pavilion, and England were – yet again – staring down the barrel at 45 for 4.

However, England weren't undone that easily. Waiting for Jason Gillespie, who had been conceding many runs all series, Andrew Flintoff and Paul Collingwood paired up for a calm 103 in a little over 20 overs, before Collingwood became Brett Lee's second victim of the day, luring Collingwood to attempt a cut shot off a fast, short ball and edging to keeper Adam Gilchrist. England's resistance didn't end, however, and despite Lee ripping out wickets – ending with five for 41 – the lower-order combined, eking out 30 from the last 21 balls to lift England to a somewhat defensible total of 223 for 8.

And, when Andrew Flintoff was brought on as the fourth bowler to be used in six overs, and removed Gilchrist with his second ball of the day, things looked hopeful for England, but that was as good as it ever got. Ricky Ponting smashed 14 fours and a six on his way to 111, making a century off 105 balls, Michael Vaughan was forced to wait with the power play overs, Simon Katich, Damien Martyn and Andrew Symonds played well-paced innings, and England found themselves unable to contain the Australians. The end was always in sight, eventually coming with 34 balls remaining, Darren Gough bowling a no-ball – his third of the day – to gift the game to Australia. It was symptomatic of Gough's poor series, and he had Gilchrist bowled off a no-ball in the very first over. His bowling analysis for the game read 6.2–0–43–1.

==== England v Australia (12 July) ====
12 July 2005
Scorecard

England; 228/7 (50 overs)	v	Australia; 229/2 (34.5 overs)
KP Pietersen 74 (84); JN Gillespie 3/44 (10 overs)		AC Gilchrist 121* (101); D Gough 1/37 (4 overs)

Australia won by 8 wickets
The Oval, London
Umpires: RE Koertzen (SA) and DR Shepherd (Eng)
Player of the match: AC Gilchrist (Aus)
Man of the Series: RT Ponting (Aus)

- Australia won the toss and elected to field.

This match was eerily similar to the one two days earlier – except that Jason Gillespie actually got rewards with the ball, and the batsman to play himself into form was Adam Gilchrist – however, both England and Australia picked batsmen as their supersubs, just like on 10 July. Australia won the toss, chose to field to gain an extra batsman, and had England on the rack.

The game was won in the first few overs. The pitch, as Surrey and Hampshire showed in a game played three days later, had a par score well in excess of 300. However, Glenn McGrath's first four overs were maidens, and his fifth over only failed to be because Jason Gillespie dropped a skier, much to the amusement of the crowd. With Brett Lee bowling well and picking up the early wicket of Marcus Trescothick for a duck, England were well behind on the run rate from the start.

They never recovered. Despite another skier being dropped, this time by Adam Gilchrist, and the crowd enjoying Gillespie dropping more catches whilst practising in the field, Australia's dominance and fine fielding on the ground saw more England wickets fall. In 27.5 overs, they only mustered 93 runs – for the loss of six wickets, with Michael Vaughan, Andrew Strauss, Andrew Flintoff, Paul Collingwood and Geraint Jones all out. A desperate situation meant England had to use their substitute, putting on Vikram Solanki for bowler Simon Jones – and Solanki helped save England to some respectability, along with Kevin Pietersen. Solanki made an unbeaten 53 and Pietersen 74 as England posted 228 for 7.

On a flat, unresponsive pitch, England's bowlers (now without the subbed-off Jones) were helpless. Gilchrist smashed an 81-ball ton, with an array of shots all around the ground, and eventually ended on 121 not out. Three of the English bowlers conceded more than six an over – Steve Harmison, with 81 runs off 9.5 overs, Darren Gough, with 37 off four, and Ashley Giles with 64 off 10. The two wickets the English got – Matthew Hayden caught behind for 31 and Ricky Ponting stumped for 44 – were largely pointless.

In all, it was a comprehensive victory for Australia, probably one of their easiest on the entire tour – possibly excluding the 19-over demolition of Bangladesh in game six of the group stage, with the biggest excitement being when the officials and players were presented to His Royal Highness the Duke of Edinburgh in the break. The Duke was at the ground to officially open the new OCS stand at the Oval. He took the opportunity to lead the tributes to umpire David Shepherd, on his retirement from international umpiring. Former British prime minister Sir John Major and current Australian prime minister John Howard also sent tributes to Shepherd.

==== Scotland v Australians (18 August) ====
Match abandoned without a ball bowled

A capacity crowd of 4,500 was at The Grange in Edinburgh to watch the local heroes of the Scottish cricket team face off with the world's highest-ranked team, Australia. The game was to be a highlight of the Scottish season, with the ground authorities reporting that they could have sold the tickets three times over. The BBC had won the rights to broadcast the match in Scotland, making it the first cricket match to be broadcast on the BBC since 1999.

However, rain poured down steadily, although a buoyant crowd still queued to enter the ground. This weather first cut the match down to 20 overs and later started again to prevent any play whatsoever. Although Cricket Scotland had insured against rain to alleviate pecuniary disadvantage, the lack of a match represented a lost opportunity to help develop the game north of the English border. (Cricinfo scorecard)

=== Two-innings games ===
==== Leicestershire v Australians (15–17 July) ====
Match drawn

Australia were having difficulty choosing between an out-of-form Jason Gillespie (8 wickets at a bowling average of 50.37 in the ODIs) and an almost equally out-of-form Michael Kasprowicz (7 wickets at 34.29), and thus this match with Leicestershire was a fight between the two to keep the place in the Test team. But the two almost exclusively failed to take wickets, with only Brett Lee and Stuart MacGill taking more than two for the match. Lee opened the game by removing Darren Robinson lbw for a golden duck, and Leicestershire eventually subsided for 217 – Australian Chris Rogers top-scoring with 56, Lee taking four for 53. Australia then amassed 582 for 7 over the next day and a half, Justin Langer (115), Ricky Ponting (119) and Damien Martyn with an unbeaten 154 all making centuries. However, it was Rogers who was to make the highest score of the match, as he added with Robinson for 247 for the first wicket – and went on to make a career highest score of 209, right in front of the Australian selectors. When the fifth Leicestershire wicket fell with the Leicestershire score on 363, both teams agreed to a draw. (Cricinfo scorecard)

==== Worcestershire v Australians (30 July – 1 August) ====
Match drawn

The first day only allowed one over of play, after Vikram Solanki sent Australia in to bat and Justin Langer hit a four off Kabir Ali. On the second day, Langer and Matthew Hayden accumulated 110 for the first wicket, and runs just kept flowing as the Australians made 402 in a day – Brad Haddin top-scoring with 94, Jason Gillespie making an unbeaten 53 including two sixes, while Nadeem Malik got the best bowling figures three wickets for 78. Ali, meanwhile, was punished, to end with 124 conceded runs in 20 overs.

Worcestershire got off to a good start on the final day, Stephen Moore and Solanki making 85 for the fourth wicket after Jason Gillespie shook the top order early on. However, Michael Kasprowicz took four quick wickets as Worcestershire imploded from 133 for 3 to 151 for 9, while a bit of late order slogging from James Pipe and Malik sent the score to 187. Malik was last out, caught and bowled by Kasprowicz to complete the Australian's five-wicket haul and mark the end of the Worcestershire innings. Australian captain Ricky Ponting opted for batting practice, and the Australians made 168 for 2 before stumps, Ponting scoring an unbeaten 59 while Michael Clarke, who was promoted to opener, also repaired a first-innings failure, making 59 off 55 balls before being run out. (Cricinfo scorecard)

==== Northamptonshire v Australia (20–21 August) ====
Match drawn

Australia scored more than four times as many runs for each wicket as their hosts Northamptonshire at Northampton, yet the two-day time limit and Australia's hunger for batting practice ensured a draw. Northamptonshire won the toss, and put their guests in to bat, and Steffan Jones got two early breakthroughs as Australia were set back to 69 for 3 – Damien Martyn having spent only 14 minutes at the crease for his 26 – but Matthew Hayden and Michael Clarke spent good time in the middle making their centuries. The Australians declared on 374 for 6, and immediately dug into the Northamptonshire batsmen, who were effectively reduced to 48 for 5 when Tim Roberts retired hurt for 18. Glenn McGrath only bowled 11 overs, but used his time well, taking three for 24, while Shaun Tait and Brett Lee also got among the wickets with two each. Northamptonshire were bowled out for 169, and Australia opted to bat again, Simon Katich and Justin Langer both making half-centuries before the final day's play ended and the game was drawn. (Cricinfo scorecard)

==== Essex v Australians (3–4 September) ====
Match drawn

Both sides surpassed 500 in their innings in this two-day match, which included four centuries and expensive bowling figures on either side – as Jason Gillespie was the most economical, with an analysis reading 22–3–80–0. Essex batted first at Chelmsford after winning the toss, and Will Jefferson added 140 for the first wicket with Alastair Cook before being bowled by Michael Kasprowicz. However, the second-wicket partnership was worth even more than the first. Cook slashed 33 fours and one six on his way to 214 – which would have been his highest first-class score if the match had had first class status – and added 270 with Ravi Bopara.

After 105 overs, Essex declared with the score 502 for 4, giving Australia the turn to exploit bad bowling and a flat pitch. Justin Langer and Matthew Hayden added 213 for the first wicket, Hayden went on to make a 118-ball 150 before retiring, while Brad Hodge was allowed to top score with 166 from number 4, including a 161-run fifth-wicket partnership with Brad Haddin. For Essex, James Middlebrook got the best bowling figures with two for 110, including Adam Gilchrist for 8, as Australia finished the day's batting practice with the score 561 for 6. (Cricinfo scorecard)
