= Shane Watson =

Australian cricketer (born 1981)

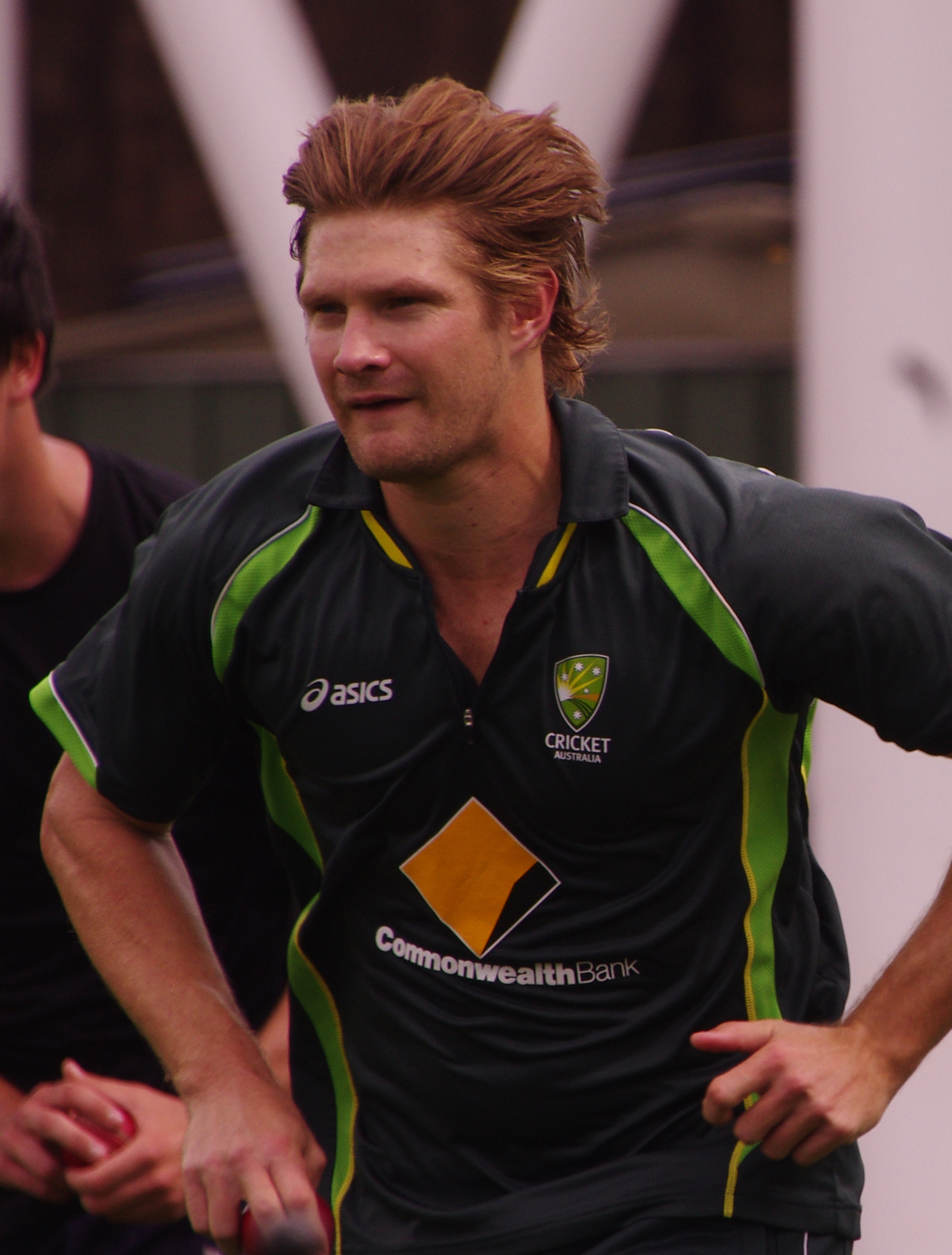
- Watson in 2014

Personal information
- Full name: Shane Robert Watson
- Born: 17 June 1981 (age 45); Ipswich, Queensland, Australia
- Nickname: Watto
- Height: 1.83 m (6 ft 0 in)
- Batting: Right-handed
- Bowling: Right-arm fast-medium
- Role: All-rounder

International information
- National side: Australia (2002–2016)
- Test debut (cap 391): 2 January 2005 v Pakistan
- Last Test: 8 July 2015 v England
- ODI debut (cap 148): 24 March 2002 v South Africa
- Last ODI: 5 September 2015 v England
- ODI shirt no.: 33
- T20I debut (cap 19): 24 February 2006 v South Africa
- Last T20I: 27 March 2016 v India

Domestic team information
- Years: Team
- 2000/01–2003/04: Tasmania
- 2004–2005: Hampshire
- 2004/05–2008/09: Queensland
- 2008–2015: Rajasthan Royals
- 2010/11–2015/16: New South Wales
- 2011/12: Sydney Sixers
- 2012/13: Brisbane Heat
- 2015/16: Canterbury
- 2015/16–2018/19: Sydney Thunder
- 2016–2017: Islamabad United
- 2016–2017: Royal Challengers Bangalore
- 2016–2017: St Lucia Stars
- 2018–2020: Quetta Gladiators
- 2018–2020: Chennai Super Kings
- 2019/20: Rangpur Rangers

Career statistics
Competition	Test	ODI	T20I	FC
Matches	59	190	58	137
Runs scored	3,731	5,757	1,462	9,451
Batting average	35.19	40.54	29.24	42.57
100s/50s	4/24	9/33	1/10	20/54
Top score	176	185*	124*	203*
Balls bowled	5,495	6,466	930	12,164
Wickets	75	168	48	210
Bowling average	33.68	31.79	24.72	29.97
5 wickets in innings	3	0	0	7
10 wickets in match	0	0	0	1
Best bowling	6/33	4/36	4/15	7/69
Catches/stumpings	45/–	64/–	20/–	109/–
Medal record
Men's Cricket
Representing Australia
ICC Cricket World Cup
Winner	2007 West Indies
Winner	2015 Australia and New Zealand
ICC Champions Trophy
Winner	2006 India
Winner	2009 South Africa
ICC T20 World Cup
Runner-up	2010 West Indies
- Source: ESPNcricinfo, 17 January 2019

Shane Robert Watson (born 17 June 1981) is an Australian cricket coach, commentator and former cricketer who played for and occasionally captained the Australian national cricket team between 2002 and 2016. He was an all-rounder who played as a right-handed batsman and a right-arm fast-medium bowler. He was ranked as the world's No. 1 all-rounder in Twenty20 Internationals (T20I) for 150 weeks, including an all-time record of 120 consecutive weeks from 13 October 2011 to 30 January 2014. He began playing during the Australian team's golden era in the early 2000s, and was the last player from this era to retire. In his time playing for Australia, Watson was part of their winning squad in the Cricket World Cup two times in 2007, and 2015 along with the ICC Champions Trophy twice in 2006 and 2009, with Watson named as the player of the match in the final on both occasions, as he scored the winning run in the 2006 tournament, with the winning six in the 2009 tournament.

Watson also played Twenty20 cricket for a number of leagues around the world, including the Indian Premier League (IPL). He was named the player of the tournament in the IPL twice (in 2008 and 2013) and won the tournament twice (in 2008 and 2018). He continued to play in Twenty20 leagues after his retirement from international cricket in 2016, and retired from all forms of cricket in 2020.

== Early life and career ==
Watson was raised in Ipswich, Queensland. For his education he attended St Marys Primary School and Ipswich Grammar School. He began playing cricket at an early age and represented Queensland Primary Schools in an interstate championship in Darwin in 1993. He began playing club cricket in Ipswich for the local Brothers club, then played Brisbane Grade Cricket for Eastern Suburbs. He represented the state at both under-17s level (in 1996/97) and under-19s level (in 1997/98, 1998/99, and 1999/00), and ultimately represented Australia in the 2000 Under-19 Cricket World Cup.

Watson was an AIS Australian Cricket Academy scholarship holder in 2000. Before 2000, players who were part of the academy were required to play cricket in their home states in the following year, but a rule change that year made Watson a free agent, and he chose to move to Hobart, Tasmania where he was guaranteed an immediate place in the Tasmanian state team. He played for Tasmania in the second half of the 2000–01 Sheffield Shield season, making his way up the order from batting at number 7 on debut to batting at number 4 at season's end. In half a season he scored 309 runs at an average of 51.50, including his maiden first-class century in his fifth match, and took 11 wickets at an average of 26.27. At the end of the season he signed a three-year contract with Tasmania.

== International career ==
=== 2002–2009 ===
Watson was first selected for the Australian team in early 2002, being selected to tour South Africa with the Test team. He had topped the Pura Cup wicket-taking charts for Tasmania, as well as had steady middle-order batting performances. On the tour, he played a tour match against the South Africa A team, where he scored a quickfire century off of 96 deliveries and took three wickets. Watson also made his ODI debut on tour, replacing Steve Waugh, who was sacked after the team failed to make the finals of the 2001–02 VB Series.

Watson continued as a regular member of the ODI team in place of Waugh despite public support for Waugh to return to the ODI team. He stayed in the team until the start of 2003, when he suffered three stress fractures in his back, meaning he missed the 2003 Cricket World Cup. When he returned to cricket from his injury, he was only able to bat, not bowl, while his recovery finished.

Watson was contracted with Hampshire to play county cricket in 2004. He signed as a replacement player, as Hampshire knew that their two international players (Shane Warne and Michael Clarke) would be unavailable for part of the season while they played for Australia. In April 2004, Watson also switched teams in domestic cricket, moving back to his home state to play for Queensland.

In January 2005, Watson made his test debut in the third Test of Australia's home series against Pakistan at the Sydney Cricket Ground (SCG). Watson was played as Australia's fifth bowler, giving them the ability to play three fast bowlers (including Watson) and two spin bowlers (instead of the usual one) on a dry pitch that was expected to be conducive to spin bowling.

Watson was part of Australia's ODI squad in their 2005 tour of England. While on the tour, the Australian team spent a night in Lumley Castle in County Durham. The castle is believed to be haunted, and Watson was "spooked out" by his room so fled and spent the night sleeping on the floor in teammate Brett Lee's room instead. Australian selectors included Watson as the fifth bowler and all rounder in all Test matches following the 2005 Ashes series. Watson played against the ICC World XI in the role, but he dislocated his shoulder in just his second Test in that designated role against the West Indies, after diving to field a ball. Watson was again replaced by Symonds and was unable to represent Australia for the remainder of the summer.

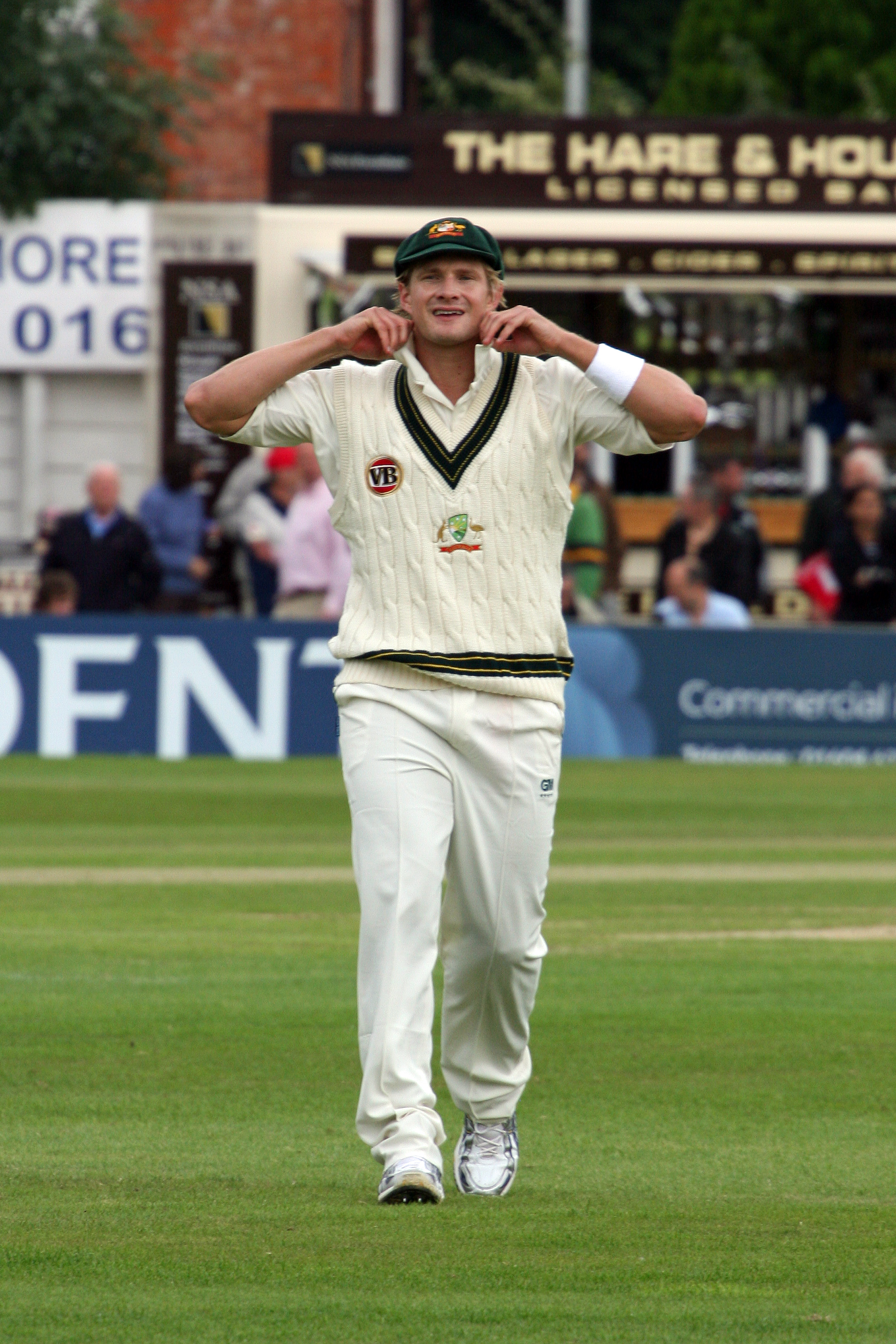
Shane Watson in 2009

This changed when Watson opened the batting for Australia at the 2006 ICC Champions Trophy, alongside wicket-keeper Adam Gilchrist, instead of Simon Katich. After failing in the first two matches against the West Indies and England, Watson made a 50 in Australia's victory over India, which sealed their place in the semi-finals, he then took 2 wickets and scored 57 not out in the finals to seal the win. In the 2009 ICC Champions Trophy held in South Africa, Watson again played a prominent role, making two consecutive 100s against England and New Zealand in semi-final and final, helping Australia to defend their title.

Watson was named in the squad for the 2006–07 Ashes series against England. However, he came off the ground in a one-day domestic game the week before the first Test with a suspected hamstring tear, which ruled him out for the first three Tests.

Watson had expected to be fit for the Boxing Day Test, however, another injury setback in a match for Queensland ruled Watson out for the rest of the Ashes series. Watson eventually returned in February to the ODI team, replacing Cameron White in the all rounder position, However he again broke down with injury during the 29th match of 2007 Cricket World Cup and missed three matches of the Super 8's before returning in fine style scoring an unbeaten 65 off 32 balls against New Zealand. Injury again struck Watson in the early stages of the 2007 ICC World Twenty20 as he missed most of the tournament due to hamstring strain. He was then out of action for the 2007–08 Australian season.

After Symonds was omitted from the Australian team for disciplinary reasons, Watson took the all rounder's position for the tour of India in late 2008, batting at No. 6. During the Third Test in Delhi, he was involved in a series of confrontations with Indian opener Gautam Gambhir, who scored a double century and reached his century by lofting Watson over wide long-on for six.

After returning to Australia, Symonds was recalled to the Test team and both all rounders played in the First Test against New Zealand in Brisbane. As the pitch was a green, rain-affected moist surface expected to favour seamers, spinner Jason Krejza was dropped to accommodate two seam bowling all rounders. After the match, which Australia won, Watson was dropped as spinner Nathan Hauritz was included and Symonds retained. At the end of the year, Watson suffered a stress fracture of the back. Watson returned to international duty in the ODI series against Pakistan in the UAE, scoring a century.

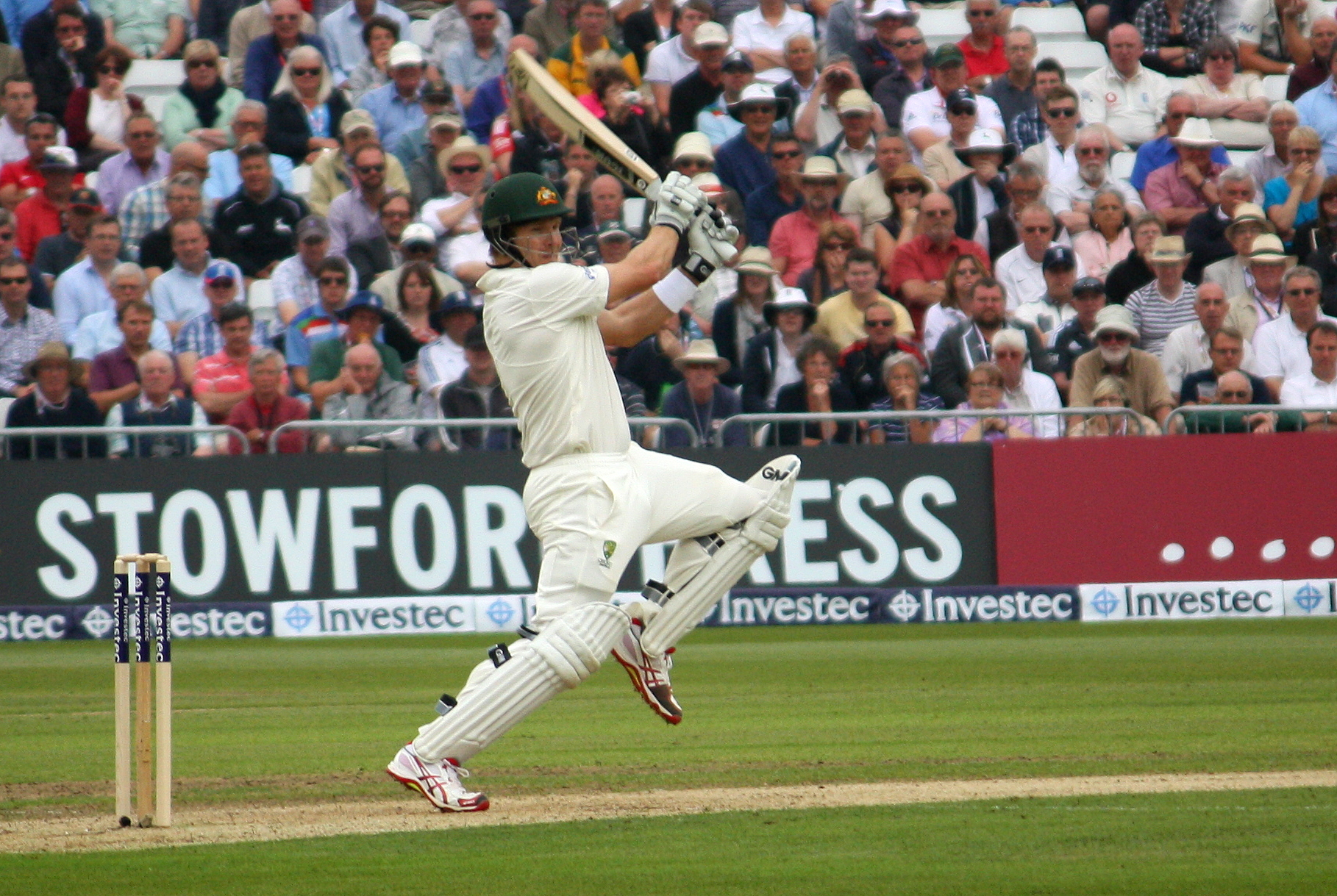
Shane Watson plays a cut shot.

He returned to the Australian Test team for the 3rd Ashes Test match at Edgbaston on 30 July 2009 as an opener. In a rain interrupted match he made 62 and 53 batting alongside Simon Katich. He scored his second highest Test score of 96 against the West Indies in the Second Test in Adelaide in December 2009. He and Katich put on a century stand and he had reached 96 at stumps, only to inside edge his first ball of the next morning onto his stumps while attempting to hit a boundary to reach his century. In the Third Test, he made 89 in another century stand with Katich. In the second innings, he removed opposition captain Chris Gayle and then charged towards him, screaming in celebration directly in front of him. This earned him a fine from the match referee.

In the First Test against Pakistan, he made 93 runs on Boxing Day and featured in his third century stand in as many matches with Katich, but was run out after a mix-up with Katich in which both players ended up running towards the same end, again falling short of his debut Test hundred. On Day four, Watson finally made his first Test hundred, which came in interesting style, by hitting the ball hard to the fielder at point who put the catch down. When Ponting declared, he remained not out on 120. Watson was awarded man of the match on 30 December for his role in Australia's Test victory.

In the second innings of the Second Test at the SCG, Watson fell short of another century, dismissed for 97. During this Test, the Australian Cricket Media Association presented Watson with Australian Cricketer of the Year Award.

=== 2010–2014 ===
In the first test of Australia's 2010 tour of India, Watson opened his account with his second test century – an attritional 126 runs off 338 balls on a slow, low Mohali pitch. The innings capped an excellent start to the tour, as he also scored a century in each innings of the warm-up match, albeit at a much brisker pace. He topscored again in the second innings with a run-a-ball 56, which proved vital in setting a competitive target as Australia's middle order again collapsed in spectacular fashion following his dismissal.

During this period as an opener, he had the highest Australian Test batting average (50.40) for 2 calendar years (2009–2010).

Shane Watson's record as captain
	Matches	Won	Lost	Drawn	Tied	No result	Win %
ODI	9	5	3	0	1	0	61.11%
Test	1	0	1	0	0	–	–
T20I	1	0	1	0	0	–	–
Date last Updated:		31 January 2016					

On 30 March 2011, Watson was named test and ODI vice-captain. On 11 April 2011 he made 185 not out off 96 balls against Bangladesh. Watson made several records in this match, which include most sixes, highest score by an Australian batsman, fastest 150, most runs from boundaries, highest individual score while chasing in an ODI and highest score in the second innings of an ODI match, dethroning MS Dhoni's 183 not out against Sri Lanka in 2005 (he held this record until it was broken by Fakhar Zaman in April 2021).

During 2010–2013, he won a series of Australian "Player of the Year" awards, including the Allan Border Medal in 2010 and 2011.

Before the start of 2012 ICC World Twenty20, there were no expectations on Australia as it was ranked only 10th in the world. After two stages of the tournament, Australia were placed at sixth, moving up four places and became one of the favourites to win the tournament. This is the only time a team's place in the rankings has changed so drastically in a short time, due to four straight wins against top-ranked teams. Much of this success was due to an in-form Shane Watson.

In the first match against Ireland at R. Premadasa Stadium in Colombo, Watson opened the bowling and took 3–26 (the wickets of opener-captain William Porterfield, keeper-batsman Niall O'Brien and all-rounder Kevin O'Brien); he then scored 51 from 30 balls to help his team win the match in 15.1 overs. He was subsequently named as Man of the Match. In the next match against the West Indies he again opened the bowling and batting, taking 2–29 from 4 overs (the wickets of Chris Gayle & Kieron Pollard). He then scored 41 not out from 24 balls to win the Man of the Match award as his team won by 17 runs (by the Duckworth-Lewis method). Against India, he was used as second change bowler and took 3–34. It was he who had changed the game by taking the wickets of Yuvraj Singh and opener Irfan Pathan in the 11th over. He also dismissed Suresh Raina in the last over. He followed it up with 72 from 42 balls (7 sixes and 2 fours) making a mockery of the target 141. Against South Africa he took 2–29 (the wickets of Hashim Amla and AB de Villiers), following it up with 70 from 47 balls to win his fourth consecutive Man of the Match award. At the completion of the group stages and Super Eight stages, Watson had the most runs, wickets and sixes. His dominance with both bat and ball made him the unanimous choice of the experts to be named Player of the Tournament.

Watson was part of Australia's team in their 2013 Test series in India. Australia suffered heavy defeats in the first two Test matches. After the second match, coach Mickey Arthur requested that the players each give an individual presentation on the team's failures and where they could improve. Watson and three other players (Mitchell Johnson, James Pattinson, and Usman Khawaja) failed to do so. As a result, the team management (including Arthur and captain Michael Clarke, who was a team selector at the time) decided not to consider the four players for selection in the third Test match. Watson and his then-pregnant wife left India and returned home to Australia for the birth of their child, a contingency that had been in place before he was dropped. Watson returned to India for the final match of the series, and stood in as the team's captain because Clarke had a back injury. Australia lost the match and ultimately lost the series 4–0, with Watson's poor batting in particular letting the team down.

Following the series in India, Australia played back-to-back Ashes series in the 2013 English summer and the 2013–14 Australian summer. Watson played in both series, batting at number 3.

=== 2015–2016 ===
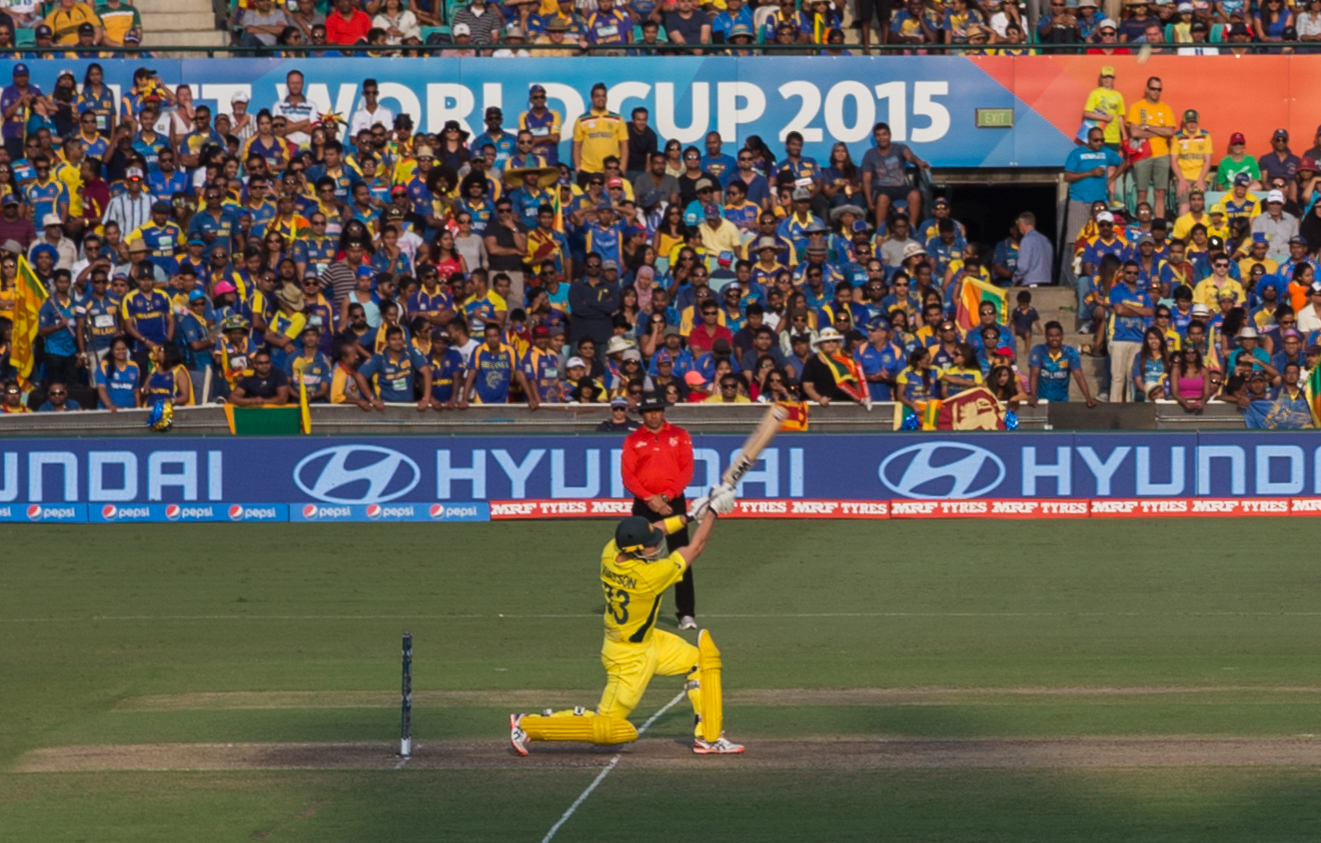
Shane Watson at the 2015 Cricket World Cup

Shane Watson was named as one of the members of Australia's 15-man World Cup squad on 11 January 2015. He played in all but one of Australia's World Cup matches, as Australia went on to win the tournament. Watson had a disappointing start to his World Cup campaign, dismissed for a first ball duck in Australia's first match of the tournament against England, and dismissed for 23 against New Zealand in a losing effort. As a result of his poor form, Watson was dropped for Australia's match against Afghanistan, and was replaced by James Faulkner. However, he was reinstated for Australia's next match against Sri Lanka, scoring 67 off 41 balls, and taking 1/71 off 7 overs as Australia prevailed by 64 runs. In Australia's final group stage match, against Scotland, Watson scored 24 runs from 23 balls and took 1/18 off three overs as Australia defeated Scotland by 7 wickets and qualified for the knockout stage. In Australia's quarter final match against Pakistan, Watson was on the receiving end of a bowling spell from Wahab Riaz which received praise from numerous cricketers. After being dropped by Rahat Ali at square leg at 4 runs, Watson went on to score 64 not out from 66 balls as Australia recorded a 6 wicket victory with 97 balls to spare. Watson played in Australia's 95 run semi-final victory over India, scoring 28 runs from 30 balls. Watson played in the 2015 Cricket World Cup Final, scoring 2 not out as Australia prevailed over New Zealand by 7 wickets, winning their fifth Cricket World Cup as a result.

Watson was part of Australia's squad for their 2015 tour of England, which included the 2015 Ashes series. He played in the first Test match of the Ashes in Cardiff, but he failed to take any wickets with the ball or score many runs with the bat. He was dropped from the team for the rest of the series. In the following ODI series against England, Watson suffered a calf injury which ruled him out of the rest of the tour. After this injury, Watson decided to retire from Test cricket with the hope of continuing to play in the two shorter formats.

On 31 January 2016, Watson was named T20I captain and became one of the few Australians to captain in all formats, he opened the innings after a long gap and scored 124*, which made several records, including becoming the first Australian batsman to score a century in all three formats of the game.

Watson played for Australia in the 2016 World Twenty20 in March 2016 in India. Partway through the tournament, on 24 March, 14 years to the day since his international debut for Australia, Watson announced that he would retire from international cricket at the end of the tournament. Watson was the last remaining Australian player from Australia's dominant era in the early 2000s (having made his debut before Shane Warne and Glenn McGrath retired in 2007, usually seen as the end of Australia's dominant era). He played his final match in Australia's loss to India in their final group match, which knocked them out of the tournament.

== T20 franchise cricket ==
=== Indian Premier League ===
Watson played for Rajasthan Royals in seven of the first eight seasons of the Indian Premier League, signing for the team for the inaugural IPL season in 2008. He was the Player of the Tournament during the season, but missed the second season whilst on international duty. In 2013 he scored his first Twenty20 century playing against Chennai Super Kings, scoring 101 runs from 61 balls, hitting six fours and six sixes. He again won the Player of the Tournament in 2013. He captained the team in 2014 and was the highest-paid overseas player.

In 2016, Rajasthan were suspended from the competition for two years. Watson was forced to enter the IPL auction for the first time since 2008, and was bought by Royal Challengers Bangalore for AU$1.96 million, the most of any Australian player. He captained the team for some matches during the 2017 season but was signed by Chennai Super Kings for the following season. He scored his third and fourth IPL centuries during the 2018 season, and remained with the team in 2019.

In 2019 IPL final, after the Mumbai Indians batted first and scored 149, Watson top-scored for Chennai with 80 runs off 59 balls. His innings took the match into the final over, but he was run out and Chennai finished their innings on 148 runs, losing the final by a single run. Following the match, Watson's teammate Harbhajan Singh posted a photograph taken during the match on Instagram. The photograph showed Watson's pant soaked with his leg's blood, and Singh wrote in the image's caption that "[Watson] got 6 stitches after the game ... got injured while diving but continue [sic] to bat without telling anyone".

Watson played his final IPL season in 2020 for Chennai. On 2 November 2020, he announced his retirement from all forms of cricket. Ahead of IPL 2022, Watson joined Delhi Capitals as assistant coach of the franchise.

=== Other leagues ===
Watson signed with Australian Big Bash League franchise Sydney Thunder in 2015 and was a member of the team that won the BBL that season. He was the captain of the team. He played for the team until the end of the 2018/19 season. In the 2018–19 BBL season, Watson scored his maiden BBL century against the Brisbane Heat. In doing so, he became the first Australian player to score a century in the BBL, the IPL, and in T20I cricket.

In 2016 Watson was announced as one of the icon players for the first season of the Pakistan Super League. He played for Islamabad United initially, moving to Quetta Gladiators in subsequent seasons. Quetta Gladiators appointed Shane Watson as the Head Coach for the PSL 9 Season. The same year he was a marquee player in the Caribbean Premier League, playing in the league for two seasons.

== Statistics and achievements ==
Watson was one of the most successful all-rounders in the history of international cricket, particularly in limited overs matches. At the end of his international career in 2016, he was one of only seven cricketers to have scored 10,000 runs and taken 250 wickets in international cricket.

In ODI cricket, Watson was ranked as the No. 1 all-rounder in the world in 2011, and reached a career-high as the No. 3 batter in the world. As part of the Australian team, he won the Cricket World Cup twice (in 2007 and 2015) and the ICC Champions Trophy twice (in 2006 and 2009), winning the player-of-the-match award in the tournament final both times.

In T20I cricket he was ranked as the No. 1 all-rounder in the world for two years, and also peaked as the No. 1 batter in the world. He never won the ICC Men's T20 World Cup with Australia, but he was named the player of the tournament in the 2012 tournament, when he had the most runs and second-most wickets of all players at the tournament.

=== International centuries ===
Watson scored 14 centuries in international cricket: four in Test matches, nine in ODIs and one in a Twenty20 International. When he scored his maiden Twenty20 International century in 2016, he became the 10th player in history to score a century in all three formats, and the first Australian to achieve the feat.

Test centuries scored by Shane Watson
No.	Score	Against	Venue	Date	Result
1	120*	Pakistan	Melbourne Cricket Ground	26 December 2009	Australia won
2	126	India	Punjab Cricket Association Stadium, Mohali	1 October 2010	Australia lost
3	176	England	The Oval, London	21 August 2013	Drawn
4	103	England	WACA Ground, Perth	13 December 2013	Australia won

ODI centuries scored by Shane Watson
No.	Score	Against	Venue	Date	Result
1	126	West Indies	St George's, Grenada	29 June 2008	Australia won
2	116*	Pakistan	Sheikh Zayed Cricket Stadium, Abu Dhabi	3 May 2009	Australia lost
3	136*	England	SuperSport Park, Centurion	2 October 2009	Australia won
4	105*	New Zealand	SuperSport Park, Centurion	5 October 2009	Australia won
5	161*	England	Melbourne Cricket Ground	16 January 2011	Australia won
6	185*	Bangladesh	Shere Bangla National Stadium, Dhaka	11 April 2011	Australia won
7	122	West Indies	Manuka Oval, Canberra	6 February 2013	Australia won
8	143	England	Rose Bowl, Southampton	16 September 2013	Australia won
9	102	India	Vidarbha Cricket Association Stadium, Nagpur	30 October 2013	Australia lost

T20I centuries scored by Shane Watson
No.	Score	Against	Venue	Date	Result
1	124*	India	Sydney Cricket Ground	31 January 2016	Australia lost

=== Awards ===
Across all three formats of international cricket (Test, ODI, and T20I), Watson has been named the Player of the Match on 29 occasions and the Player of the Series on 7 occasions. The majority of these awards came in One Day International cricket, where he won 17 Player of the Match awards and 4 Player of the Series awards.

Cricket Australia holds an annual awards ceremony called the Australian Cricket Awards, where they honour the best cricketers in the country over the previous year. The most prestigious of these awards is the Allan Border Medal, which is awarded to "the most outstanding Australian male cricketer of the season". Watson has won the Allan Border Medal twice, and has won several other awards at the Australian Cricket Awards:

- Allan Border Medal: 2010, 2011
- Test Player of the Year: 2011
- Men's ODI Player of the Year: 2010, 2011, 2012
- Men's T20I Player of the Year: 2012, 2013, 2017
- Bradman Young Cricketer of the Year: 2002
- ICC Men's ODI Team of the Year: 2010, 2011, 2012 (12th man)

=== Records ===
During his international career, Watson set several records with his performances as both a batsman and a bowler.

- In an ODI against Bangladesh in April 2011, Watson scored 185 runs off of 96 deliveries. In this innings, Watson hit 15 sixes (at the time the most of any ODI innings, and as of January 2023 still the 6th-most of any ODI innings) and scored 150 runs from boundaries alone (at the time the most of any ODI innings, and as of January 2023 still the 4th-most of any ODI innings).
- In a Test match against South Africa in November 2011, Watson took bowling figures of 5/17 from 5 overs. Taking a wicket every 6 balls, as of January 2023 this is the 8th-best bowling strike rate of any Test innings with 4 or more wickets taken.
- In a Twenty20 International against India in January 2016, Watson scored 124 runs from 71 deliveries. At the time, this was the second-highest score in any Twenty20 International (it remains the 10th-highest as of January 2023) and the highest score by a captain (it remains the 3rd-highest as of January 2023). Australia ultimately lost this match by 7 wickets, and as of January 2023 this remains the highest score by a player in a losing team. At the time this was also the longest innings in a Twenty20 International by number of balls faced (as of January 2023 it is the 4th-longest).

== Personal life ==
Watson is married to broadcaster Lee Furlong. They have two children. Watson bats and bowls right-handed but writes left-handed. In 2017, Watson launched a sports clinic, Let’s Activate, for children. It teaches the basics of sports skills, using songs, movement, dance and sports activities. Watson has his own podcast called Lessons Learnt with the Greats.

In November 2019, he was elected as the President of the Australian Cricketers' Association.
