= Shane Bond =

New Zealand cricketer (born 1975)

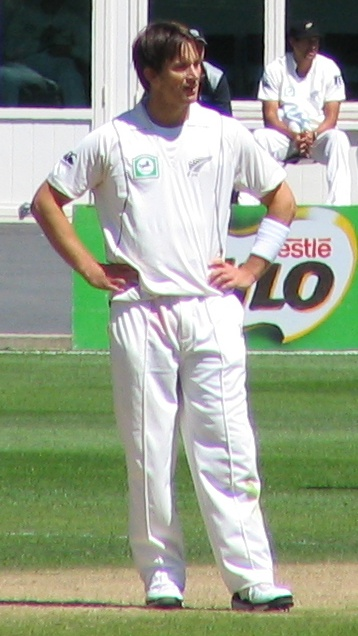
- Bond at the University Oval in 2009

Personal information
- Full name: Shane Edward Bond
- Born: 7 June 1975 (age 51); Christchurch, Canterbury, New Zealand
- Nickname: James Bond, Bondy, 007
- Height: 1.85 m (6 ft 1 in)
- Batting: Right-handed
- Bowling: Right-arm fast
- Role: Bowler

International information
- National side: New Zealand (2001–2010)
- Test debut (cap 216): 22 November 2001 v Australia
- Last Test: 24 November 2009 v Pakistan
- ODI debut (cap 124): 11 January 2002 v Australia
- Last ODI: 13 March 2010 v Australia
- ODI shirt no.: 27
- T20I debut (cap 13): 21 October 2005 v South Africa
- Last T20I: 10 May 2010 v England

Domestic team information
- Years: Team
- 1996/97–2009/10: Canterbury
- 2002: Warwickshire
- 2008: Hampshire
- 2010: Kolkata Knight Riders

Career statistics
Competition	Test	ODI	T20I	FC
Matches	18	82	20	60
Runs scored	168	292	21	830
Batting average	12.92	16.22	4.20	16.60
100s/50s	0/0	0/0	0/0	1/2
Top score	41*	31*	8*	100
Balls bowled	3,372	4,295	465	10,263
Wickets	87	147	25	225
Bowling average	22.09	20.88	21.72	24.34
5 wickets in innings	5	4	0	12
10 wickets in match	1	0	0	1
Best bowling	6/51	6/19	3/18	7/66
Catches/stumpings	8/–	15/–	4/–	24/–
- Source: ESPNcricinfo, 10 May 2010

Shane Edward Bond (born 7 June 1975) is a New Zealand cricket coach and former cricketer and present bowling coach of Rajasthan Royals, described as "New Zealand's best fast bowler since Sir Richard Hadlee", and often among the greatest fast bowlers of his era. He represented New Zealand in Test, ODI and Twenty20 International cricket and played for Canterbury in New Zealand domestic cricket and Warwickshire in English domestic cricket. A right-arm fast bowler, his fastest recorded delivery was clocked at 156.4 km/h against India in the 2003 World Cup.

Bond's career was plagued with injuries, chiefly recurring stress fractures of the back. He had surgery in 2004 to try to prevent further injury, but it was only partially successful. In later years he suffered back problems, knee injuries and an abdominal tear. These problems, in conjunction with a late start to his fully professional cricket career, limited his appearances in both international and domestic cricket. Since his debut in the 2001/02 season, he only managed to appear in 18 Test matches for New Zealand before he retired from Test cricket in December 2009 at the age of 34.

His international career also suffered a hiatus of 18 months, due to Bond's involvement with the Delhi Giants in the 'rebel' Indian Cricket League during March 2008, which caused the New Zealand cricket board to terminate his central contract in January 2008. However, in June 2009 Bond severed ties with the rebel league and declared himself available to be selected for the national side once again. In January 2010, Bond was selected to play in the 3rd season of the Indian Premier League for the Kolkata Knight Riders. On 13 May 2010 he retired from all forms of the game and did not play in the 4th season of Indian Premier League. Brydon Coverdale on ESPNcricinfo described him as New Zealand's best fast bowler.

Bond currently has the second best bowling strike rate of all time in Test match cricket (amongst bowlers who have bowled a minimum of 2,500 deliveries), behind George Lohmann.

== Personal life ==
Bond was educated at Papanui High School. He is married to Tracey Bond and is the father of three children. Before becoming an international player he was a police officer based in Christchurch. He is a nephew of Sir Mark Solomon, chairman of Te Rūnanga o Ngāi Tahu.

== Domestic career ==
Bond made his first-class debut for Canterbury on 20 January 1997, in a match against Central Districts. He was relatively old when he made his first-class debut, at 21 years and 7 months old, and for the first few years of his career he played relatively little first-class cricket, playing only 12 matches for Canterbury in his first three seasons. His bowling figures in his first three seasons were solid but unspectacular. Bond stopped playing cricket professionally for one year after he joined the New Zealand Police in November 1999, which left him no time to pursue his cricket career. He returned to play several games for Canterbury in the 2000/01 season and had reasonable success despite his year off. He was handed his first international opportunity early in the 2001/02 season, and from then, due to injuries and international commitments he was mainly unavailable to play for Canterbury, and only appeared in eight State Championship and ten State Shield games in seven seasons.

He made a brief appearance in English county cricket in the 2002 season, representing Warwickshire in three County Championship games, finding moderate success with the ball. He returned to England to play a few matches for Hampshire in the 2008 season.

In his Indian Cricket League career, Bond appeared in seven Twenty20 games for the Delhi Giants during the March/April 2008 version of the league, but had little success, only taking two wickets at 86.50.

=== Defection to Indian Cricket League ===
In January 2008, while recovering from an injury sustained on tour in South Africa, it was announced that Bond had signed to play for the unofficial Indian Cricket League. This jeopardised his international future, as just a few days earlier New Zealand Cricket had announced that selectors would be encouraged not to select players associated with the league. As a result, at the end of the month, it was announced that Bond's contract with New Zealand Cricket had been terminated, as the International Cricket Council (ICC) prohibited contracted players from taking part in the ICL. Bond wrote in his book that he had no regret in playing for the ICL and stated that initially New Zealand cricket assured him he would still be able to represent New Zealand. He stated that the reason he defected was that while New Zealand were giving good money it would not be enough to guarantee the future of his family once his cricket career would be over. Therefore, he earned money from the ICL which would guarantee his family's future. He also stated that he had no regrets and that he was a "victim of politics" because he defected.

Once he terminated his contract with the ICL in June 2009 he returned to international cricket.

In May 2009, the Indian Cricket League announced that several players had been released from their contracts, and in June Bond confirmed to New Zealand Cricket that he had severed ties with the unofficial league, effectively making himself available to be selected for the national team. He was duly awarded a central contract for the 2009/10 season.

=== Hampshire ===
On 22 February 2008, Bond signed for English domestic cricket team Hampshire. Bond played four County Championship matches for the club, taking 19 wickets at a bowling average of 19.21, with best figures of 7/66 which came on debut against Sussex. This was one of Bond's two five-wicket hauls for the club. Additionally, Bond played in three List-A matches for Hampshire, taking 3 wickets at a bowling average of 17.00, with best figures of 3–11.

=== Indian Premier League ===
At the auction held for the third season of the lucrative IPL, Shane Bond was one of the main attractions, with his final price being over US$750,000, because of the undisclosed tiebreaker money above the $750,000. His services were purchased by Kolkata Knight Riders, owned by Shahrukh Khan.

== International career ==
Bond's first chance at international level came early in the 2001/02 season, when, following an impressive display in a match for the New Zealand academy against the touring Australian academy, he received a call-up to the Test squad to tour Australia. His debut came in the Second Test at Hobart when he was chosen ahead of Chris Martin on account of his extra pace. He had a forgettable debut in a rain-affected match, taking one for 135 in Australia's only innings. He fared little better in the Third Test at Perth, taking two for 154 in the match, which ended in a draw. Shortly thereafter, in the 2001–02 VB Series against Australia and South Africa, he earned a player-of-the-tournament award for taking 21 wickets in nine games.

After the tournament he suffered a foot injury, one of the many that would mar his career, but was back in action for New Zealand's 2002 tour of the West Indies. He was the side's top wicket taker in its first-ever series win in the Caribbean. Bond continued to bowl well, again leading the New Zealand bowling averages at the 2003 World Cup.

=== Injuries ===
Shortly after the tournament he suffered a stress fracture in his back, requiring a titanium rod to be inserted. While initially he planned to make a comeback in February 2004, he remained out of the side until August 2005. Bond's remodelled bowling action proved no less lethal than its predecessor, however: in his second match back he took six wickets for 19 runs against India.

=== Return ===
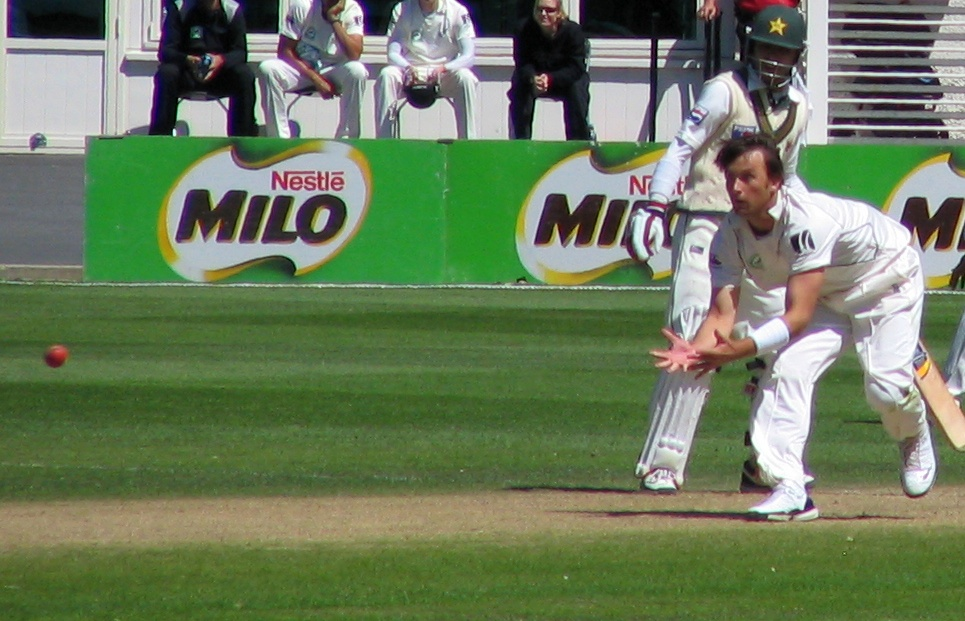
Bond taking Mohammad Yousuf caught and bowled in a Test match against Pakistan in 2009

In September 2009 he wore New Zealand colours once more, during a Twenty20 against Sri Lanka in Colombo. He worked his way back into the Test squad and had enough fuel for one final match-winning performance in the Dunedin Test against Pakistan. An abdominal tear ruled him out midway through the series before he decided to quit Tests and focus on limited-overs cricket. In January 2010 he was one of the biggest buys at the third IPL auction in Mumbai, fetching the maximum possible bid of $750,000 from the Kolkata Knight Riders.

=== Achievements and awards ===
Bond enjoyed strong success against Australia during his career. On 26 January 2002, he bowled New Zealand to victory over Australia, getting 5/25. In the Cricket World Cup, Bond achieved 6/23 again against Australia (New Zealand's best bowling performance in ODIs at the time) – which including getting Ian Harvey and Brad Hogg in consecutive deliveries. Bond struggled with back problems which cause soft tissue to break. These injuries had ruled him out in a lot of international cricket in the past.

In a Test match against the West Indies, Bond took 5–69, his fourth 5-wicket haul in just 13 International Tests Matches, and went on to win the man of the match award. He stated that this was one of his best ever bowling efforts. New Zealand defeated the West Indies by 27 runs.

On 14 January 2007, Bond took a hat-trick in the last over against Australia in a One Day International at the Bellerive Oval, dismissing Cameron White, Andrew Symonds and Nathan Bracken in successive deliveries, becoming just the second New Zealand player to take a hat-trick in limited-overs international cricket, although the game was still lost by 105 runs.

A graph showing Bond's Test career bowling statistics and how they have varied over time.

Shortly Afterwards on 23 January 2007 Bond became the second-fastest bowler in history to take 100 One-Day wickets, behind Pakistan's Saqlain Mushtaq by one match and the fastest fast bowler to reach the 100 wicket mark. Bond, however, needed 54 fewer deliveries than the Pakistani to achieve the feat, and was the fastest bowler to take 100 wickets in terms of number of deliveries bowled.

On 16 February 2007, Bond took 5–23, his fourth 5-wicket haul, in the 2007 Chappell–Hadlee Trophy. This enabled New Zealand to dismiss Australia for 149, giving the New Zealanders a 10-wicket victory over them, the Australians' heaviest one day defeat, and although he sat out the final game in the Chappell–Hadlee series, he was instrumental in the eventual 3–0 series win for the first time in Chappell–Hadlee Trophy history.

On 16 May 2007, Shane Bond was named New Zealand cricketer of the year for the 2006/2007 season and the best bowler for that season. Bond was also named in the ICC ODI XI of the year in 2006 and 2007.

Despite attempts to have his registration cancelled, Shane Bond was given permission to sign for Hampshire in the ECB County Championship. He made his début against 2007 champions Sussex on 16 April 2008, recording figures of 7–66 in the first innings. On 27 November 2009, Bond claimed his fifth five-wicket bag for New Zealand on his first test back against Pakistan.

As of August 2017, Bond is the fastest New Zealand Cricketer to take 100 wickets in ODIs. He achieved this feat in 54 matches in January 2007. He is only bettered by Saqlain Mushtaq (53 matches, May 1997) and Mitchell Starc (53 matches, August 2016).

=== Retirement ===
In December 2009, Bond announced his retirement from Test cricket due to the injuries that had been plaguing him for years. He said he wanted to elongate his career in the Limited-Overs formats of the game. He ended his career in Test cricket taking 87 wickets in 18 matches at an average of 22.09 and at a strike rate of 38.7.

On 14 May 2010, Shane Bond announced retirement from all international cricket after the 2010 ICC World Twenty20. He is regarded as the best bowler to play for Blackcaps after the period of Hadlee.

=== Playing style ===
Bond was a fast bowler capable of regularly bowling at speeds in excess of 145 km/h. He was first recorded exceeding 150 km/h in the 2001/02 season. In contrast to some other fully fast bowlers, Bond combined pace with control and accuracy, assets which helped him find success in all forms of the game.

For players who have bowled at least 1000 balls, he has the tenth best strike rate (29.2) in ODI's and the tenth best average (20.88). In Tests, limiting the statistics to player who have bowled at least 2000 balls, his strike rate (38.8) ranks third in the all-time list, the only one below 40 in the modern era (playing since 1900). His average in terms of runs conceded per wicket was 22.39.

Bond usually batted quite far down the batting order, at number nine or later, but he was capable of slogging some quick runs towards the end of an innings. Bond could close down the innings with a couple of boundaries.

== Coaching career ==
Shane Bond was appointed as the bowling coach for New Zealand cricket team in October 2012. He retired from the position after the 2015 Cricket World Cup where New Zealand reached the final.

He was widely credited with enhancing the performance of the New Zealand team during his 3-year stint, especially that of Trent Boult and Tim Southee. He became bowling coach of the Mumbai Indians in 2015, and has since become commentator for Sky Sports with Mark Richardson, Ian Smith and Simon Doull since 2016.

Bond became an assistant coach for the Brisbane Heat for the 2015 edition of the Big Bash League, working under head coach Daniel Vettori.

In March 2018, he was appointed as head coach for Sydney Thunder.

== Autobiography ==
He has written all his experiences in his autobiography written with Dylan Cleaver, Shane Bond: Looking Back.
