= Slog (disambiguation) =

A slog is a type of shot in the game cricket.

Slog may also be:

- Super-logarithm, the inverse function of super-exponentiation
- Seattle The Stranger blog
- Slog, a character in Secret Mountain Fort Awesome
