= South African cricket team in Australia in 2001–02 =

The South Africa national cricket team toured Australia in the 2001–02 cricket season. South Africa played three Test matches against Australia, and also contested the 2001–02 VB Series, a triangular One Day International tournament that also involved New Zealand.

Australia won all three Tests convincingly. However, South Africa atoned for this by winning the VB Series, beating New Zealand in the final.

== Series summary ==
=== 1st Test ===
14–18 December 2001
Scorecard

| Australia | v | South Africa |
| 439 (141 overs); Damien Martyn 124* (210); Claude Henderson 4/116 (33 overs) | | 374 (121.4 overs); Neil McKenzie 87 (168); Shane Warne 5/113 (39.4 overs) |
| 309/7d (78.1 overs); Matthew Hayden 131 (207); Jacques Kallis 3/45 (15 overs) | | 128 (67 overs); Jacques Kallis 65* (174); Glenn McGrath 3/13 (14 overs) |

Australia won by 246 runs
Adelaide Oval, Adelaide
Umpires: Simon Taufel (Aus) and Srinivas Venkataraghavan (Ind)
Player of the match: Shane Warne (Aus)

- Australia won the toss and elected to bat.

=== 2nd Test ===
26–29 December 2001
Scorecard

| South Africa | v | Australia |
| 277 (103.5 overs); Neil McKenzie 67 (163); Andy Bichel 3/44 (19.5 overs) | | 487 (139 overs); Matthew Hayden 138 (211); Shaun Pollock 3/84 (31 overs) |
| 219 (75.1 overs); Jacques Kallis 99 (180); Shane Warne 3/68 (24 overs) | | 10/1 (3 overs); Justin Langer 7 (6); Shaun Pollock 1/6 (1 over) |

Australia won by 9 wickets
Melbourne Cricket Ground, Melbourne
Umpires: Darrell Hair (Aus) and Eddie Nicholls (WI)
Player of the match: Matthew Hayden (Aus)

- Australia won the toss and elected to field.

=== 3rd Test ===
2–5 January 2002
Scorecard

| Australia | v | South Africa |
| 554 (144.2 overs); Justin Langer 126 (211); Nicky Boje 4/63 (25.2 overs) | | 154 (62.2 overs); Mark Boucher 35 (65); Glenn McGrath 3/35 (17 overs) |
| 54/0 (10.1 overs); Justin Langer 30* (30) | | 452 (141.5 overs) (f/o); Gary Kirsten 153 (359); Stuart MacGill 4/123 (45 overs) |

Australia won by 10 wickets
Sydney Cricket Ground, Sydney
Umpires: Daryl Harper (Aus) and David Shepherd (Eng)
Player of the match: Matthew Hayden (Aus) and Justin Langer (Aus)

- Australia won the toss and elected to bat.
- Justin Ontong (SA) made his Test debut.

== See also ==
- 2001–02 VB Series

== External sources ==
- CricketArchive
