= Mark Solomon (Māori leader) =

New Zealand Māori leader

Sir Mark Solomon KNZM
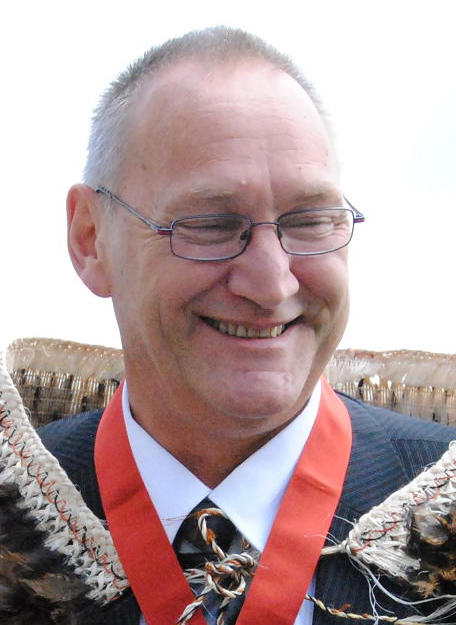
- Solomon in 2013
- Born: Mark Wiremu Solomon; 1954 (age 71–72); Christchurch, New Zealand
- Occupation: Foundry worker
- Known for: Chair of Te Rūnanga o Ngāi Tahu (1998–2016)
- Spouse: Maria Solomon
- Children: 4
- Relatives: Shane Bond (nephew)

Sir Mark Wiremu Solomon KNZM (born c. 1954) is a New Zealand Māori leader from the Ngāi Tahu and Ngāti Kurī (Kaikōura) iwi. He served as kaiwhakahaere (chairperson) of Te Rūnanga o Ngāi Tahu, the tribal council of Ngāi Tahu, for approximately 18 years, from 1998 until December 2016. His departure as tribal chair followed his decision in April 2016 not to seek re-election as the tribal representative for Kaikōura. Solomon continues to act in various directorship roles including as chair of the Canterbury District Health Board.

== Personal life ==
Solomon was born in Christchurch, New Zealand. His mother was of English and Danish descent, and his father was Māori, affiliated to the Ngāi Tahu and Ngāti Kurī iwi.

Solomon has been married to Maria since about 1974 and has four grown-up children. He is an uncle of New Zealand cricketer Shane Bond.

== Career ==
For over 20 years, Solomon was a foundry metal worker.

In 1995, he was elected to Te Rūnanga o Ngāi Tahu as the local representative for Te Rūnanga o Kaikōura, a position which he held till February 2016. Three years later, he was elected chairman of Te Rūnanga o Ngāi Tahu. The same year, Ngāi Tahu settled its Treaty of Waitangi claim with the Crown for $170 million. By the end of 2012, under Solomon's chairmanship, the iwi's commercial assets had appreciated to an estimated $809 million.

Solomon's other roles have included being a board member of the Museum of New Zealand Te Papa Tongarewa from 2001 to 2007, as well as directorships of a number of companies.

== Honours ==
In November 2012, Solomon was named as the 'Visionary Leader of 2012' in the Deloitte and New Zealand Management magazine national business awards.

In the 2013 New Year Honours, Solomon was appointed a Knight Companion of the New Zealand Order of Merit, for services to Māori and business.
