= Brad Hodge =

Australian cricketer (born 1974)

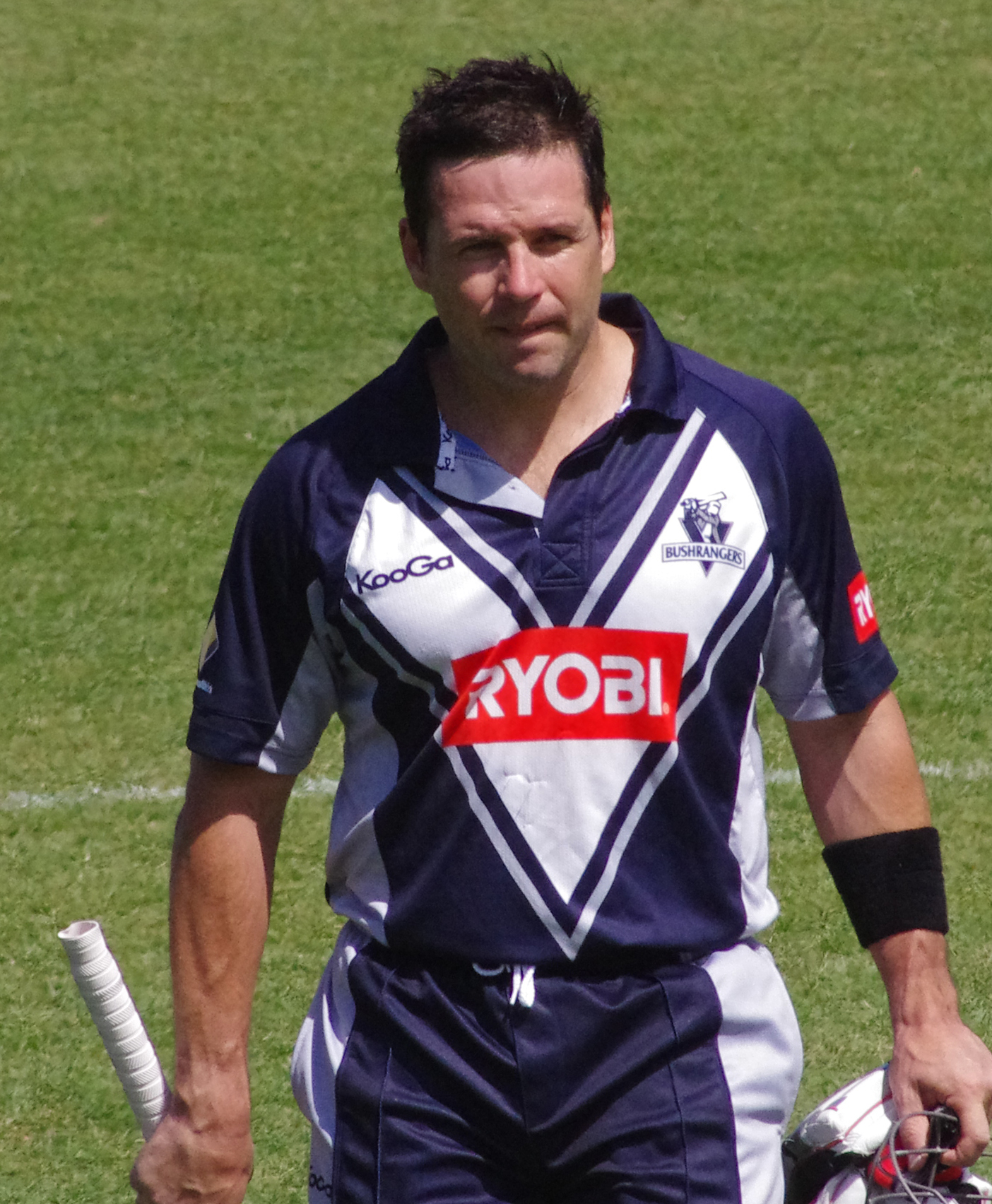
- Hodge playing for the Victorian Bushrangers in 2008

Personal information
- Full name: Bradley John Hodge
- Born: 29 December 1974 (age 51); Sandringham, Victoria, Australia
- Nickname: Dodgeball
- Height: 178 cm (5 ft 10 in)
- Batting: Right-handed
- Bowling: Right-arm off break
- Role: Batsman

International information
- National side: Australia (2005–2014)
- Test debut (cap 394): 17 November 2005 v West Indies
- Last Test: 22 May 2008 v West Indies
- ODI debut (cap 154): 3 December 2005 v New Zealand
- Last ODI: 17 October 2007 v India
- ODI shirt no.: 17
- T20I debut (cap 23): 12 September 2007 v Zimbabwe
- Last T20I: 30 March 2014 v India

Domestic team information
- Years: Team
- 1993/94–2011/12: Victoria
- 2002: Durham
- 2003–2004, 2010: Leicestershire
- 2005–2008: Lancashire
- 2008–2010: Kolkata Knight Riders
- 2010/11: Northern Districts
- 2011: Kochi Tuskers Kerala
- 2011/12, 2017/18: Melbourne Renegades
- 2012–2013: Barisal Burners
- 2012–2014: Rajasthan Royals
- 2012: Basnahira Cricket Dundee
- 2012/13: Auckland
- 2012/13–2013/14: Melbourne Stars
- 2014/15: Wellington
- 2014/15–2016/17: Adelaide Strikers
- 2016: Peshawar Zalmi
- 2016: St Kitts and Nevis Patriots

Career statistics
Competition	Test	ODI	FC	LA
Matches	6	25	223	251
Runs scored	503	786	17,084	9,127
Batting average	55.88	34.48	48.81	43.25
100s/50s	1/2	1/3	51/64	29/38
Top score	203*	123*	302*	164
Balls bowled	12	66	5,583	1,734
Wickets	0	1	74	40
Bowling average	–	51.00	41.70	38.85
5 wickets in innings	–	0	0	1
10 wickets in match	–	0	0	0
Best bowling	–	1/17	4/17	5/28
Catches/stumpings	9/–	16/–	127/–	93/–
Medal record
Men's Cricket
Representing Australia
ICC Cricket World Cup
Winner	2007 West Indies
- Source: ESPNcricinfo, 16 January 2010

Bradley John Hodge (born 29 December 1974) is an Australian cricket coach and former cricketer. He was a right-handed batsman who batted in the middle order, as well as a part-time right-arm off-spin bowler. Hodge was a member of the Australian team that won the 2007 Cricket World Cup.

Hodge was a prolific run-scorer in domestic cricket, holding the records for the most runs (5,597) and most centuries (20) in Australian interstate one-day matches. He is also Victoria's highest ever run-scorer in the Sheffield Shield (10,474 runs). However, his opportunities to represent Australia were limited to 6 Tests, 25 one-day internationals (ODIs) and 15 T20 Internationals.

== First-class career ==
Hodge attended St. Bede's College in Mentone, Victoria. He debuted for the Victorian Bushrangers as a 19-year-old, and was nicknamed "Bunkie" by Dean Jones for the fact that he shared a bunkbed with his brother at the time of his debut.

Hodge played Lancashire League Cricket for Ramsbottom in 2000 and 2001 scoring 1000 runs in each season, breaking the clubs batting record in 2001. His bowling also proved useful.

Hodge has played with County Cricket teams Durham, Lancashire, and Leicestershire – where he made his highest first class score of 302*. During his time at Leicestershire, he was accused of cheating by then-Derbyshire captain, Dominic Cork, by claiming a catch when it appeared that he had stepped over the boundary rope in a Twenty20 match in June 2003. Hodge had actually completed the catch cleanly, before running over to the crowd to celebrate. Hodge denied the accusation and considered taking legal action. Cork was sanctioned by the ECB.

Hodge scored many runs for Victoria, and his consistency came together by the 2000–01 season, where he was consistently overlooked for selection, despite being one of Australia's premier domestic batsmen. He has argued he was the victim of New South Wales selection bias.

On 21 November 2007, playing for Victoria against Queensland, Hodge made his highest Pura Cup score of 286*. He and Nick Jewell had batted undefeated for the entire third day of the game, only the fourth wicketless day's play in the history of the competition.

During the match against Queensland at the MCG on 7 March 2009, he scored 261. During this innings, he became the 6th batsman to pass 10,000 Sheffield Shield runs.

He also became the first to score a century in Australian domestic Twenty20, scoring 106 off 54 deliveries for Victoria against New South Wales at North Sydney, on 21 January 2006.

In December 2009, Hodge announced his retirement from first-class cricket to focus on the one-day and Twenty20 versions of the game. Hodge finished his domestic first-class career as Victoria's all-time leading run-scorer. In January 2012, he retired from one-day cricket to focus exclusively on the Twenty20 game. At the time, he was the leading run-scorer in the 2011–12 Ryobi One-Day Cup.

Hodge captained the Adelaide Strikers in the 2016–17 Big Bash League and while the team struggled, he was a model of consistency and named in the team of the tournament at the age of 42.

== Australian career ==
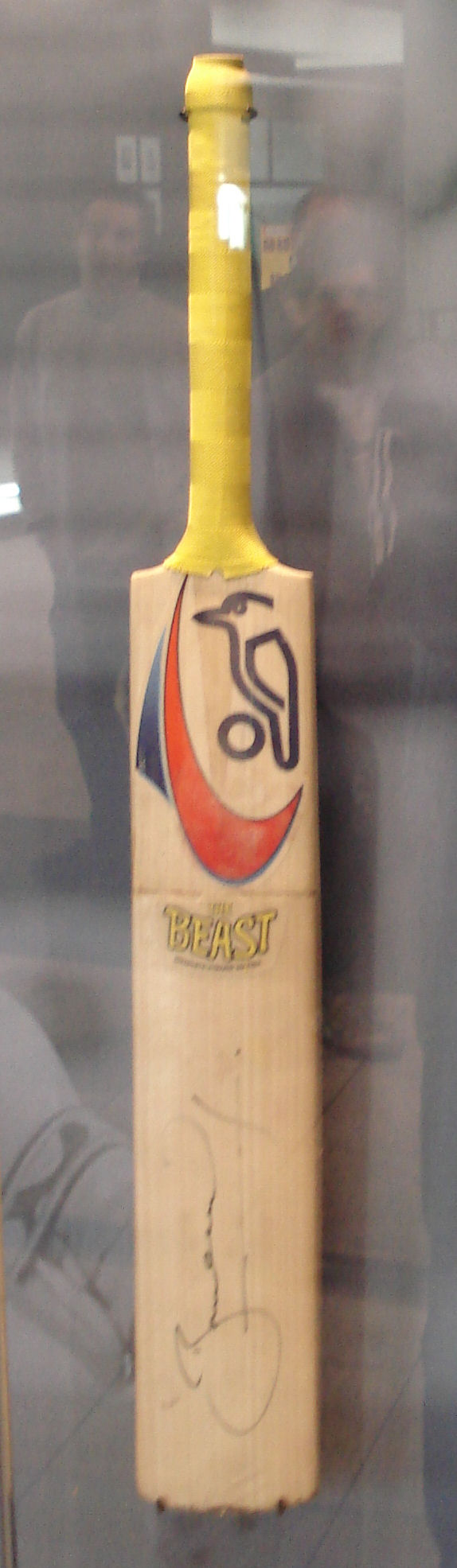
Bat used by Brad Hodge during his double century against South Africa-on display at the Melbourne Cricket Ground.

Hodge was called up as part of Australia's 2005 Ashes squad but was not used throughout the series. He did, however, take a number of catches in the third test as a substitute fielder to dismiss Kevin Pietersen and Michael Vaughan both off the bowling of Brett Lee. After a long time waiting for an international debut, he finally debuted for the Australian team against the West Indies in November 2005 at Bellerive Oval, Hobart, during the 2005–06 Test Series, becoming the 394th player to wear the baggy green for Australia. He had his baggy green presented to him by Bill Lawry.

Hodge scored his maiden Test century for Australia against South Africa in Perth on 19 December 2005. After ending the third day on 91 not out, Hodge displayed some nervousness in media interviews about reaching his century, but by the end of the innings he managed to finish with an unbeaten score of 203, batting with fluency on day four. This innings was criticised by some Australian fans who felt that captain Ricky Ponting declared too late in allowing Hodge to chase his double century. This criticism came after Australia did not bowl out South Africa in the 4th innings (despite having 120 overs to do so), with the match ending in a draw. Australia were principally thwarted by a resolute Jacques Rudolph, who replaced the injured Jacques Kallis.

Hodge made his One-day International debut against New Zealand on 2 December 2005 at Eden Park in Auckland during the 2005–06 Chappell–Hadlee Trophy. After two modest initial scores, he scored a half-century in the third ODI at the Jade Stadium in Christchurch. This earned him a call up for the 2005–06 VB Series against South Africa and Sri Lanka. However, he failed to capitalise and was dropped from the ODI side.

Hodge was dropped after only five tests in the team, and only three tests after scoring his double century against South Africa. The selectors stated that the decision was made on the back of a poor Pura Cup season by Hodge, averaging around 25 for the summer when the team was selected (he finished the season with an average of 33.3). The decision was unpopular amongst Victorian fans, particularly since his replacement, Damien Martyn, had averaged only 23.7 in the same Pura Cup season. He did get back, however, albeit more than two years later, when included in Australia's squad that toured the West Indies in May/June 2008. On 22 May, in what proved to be his final test, he made 67 and 27 with the bat.

During the 2006–07 Commonwealth Bank Series, Hodge was called into the team to replace Andrew Symonds who had pulled out with a torn bicep. He scored an unbeaten 99 off 86 balls against New Zealand at the Melbourne Cricket Ground on 4 February 2007 to guide Australia to a five wicket win in a chase of 291.

On 18 February 2007, during the 2006–07 Chappell–Hadlee Trophy, Hodge scored 97 not out off 86 balls to help Australia to 4/336 off their 50 overs. However, an unbeaten 86 by Brendon McCullum led New Zealand to a one wicket win and a 3-0 series win.

=== 2007 Cricket World Cup ===
On 18 March 2007, in the 2007 Cricket World Cup, Hodge scored his maiden one-day century against Holland. He scored 123 off just 89 balls, including 7 sixes and 8 fours and shared a record 4th-wicket partnership of 204 with Michael Clarke, the highest 4th wicket stand in World Cup history. However, he was dropped for the next match against South Africa on 24 March as allrounder Andrew Symonds recovered from a shoulder injury. Hodge returned to the team for the Super 8 match against England in place of the injured Shane Watson but did not bat. Hodge scored 152 runs from his two innings in five appearances at the tournament.

He played for Australia in a Twenty20 against India on 1 February 2008.

In December 2010, Hodge was named in Australia's initial World Cup side for the following year. However, he was not named in the final squad.

In 2012, reflecting on his lack of opportunities to play for Australia, Hodge said: "Selections have puzzled me for a number of years, and continue to puzzle me... I have played the best cricket I can in Test, four-day, one-day, and T20, but for some reason it has not been good enough. That's life."

In January 2012, Hodge announced his decision to retire from One-Day Cricket and also to retire from Victoria. He said in an interview: "I think it's just time to step aside and let some other guys come through; I'm obviously delighted to have played this long. I guess, like anyone in the world, once you've done something for so long, it's hard to let go"

In 2014, Hodge played for Australia in the 2014 ICC World Twenty20 competition. He scored 50 runs and took one wicket across three matches as Australia won only one game and failed to make it past the group stage.

== Spot Fixing ==
The 2013 Indian Premier League spot-fixing and betting case had come when the Delhi Police in India arrested three cricketers, S. Sreeshanth, Ajit Chandila and Ankeet Chavan, on the charges of alleged spot-fixing on 16 May 2013. The three represented the Rajasthan Royals in the 2013 Indian Premier League.

During investigation, Ajit Chandila has reportedly told the Delhi Police that he had allegedly contacted his teammates Brad Hodge, Kevon Cooper and Siddharth Trivedi to be part of Booking loop. The Delhi Police interrogated Siddharth, but it never interrogated Hodge.

== Later career ==
In 2022, Hodge was the narrator for Warnie, the posthumous tribute documentary for Shane Warne.
