= 2000–01 Sheffield Shield season =

Australian cricket tournament

- Cricket format: First-class
- Tournament format(s): Double round-robin & Final
- Champions: Queensland (4th title)
- Participants: 6
- Matches: 31
- Player of the series: Jamie Cox (Tasmania)
- Most runs: Greg Blewett (1,162) (South Australia)
- Most wickets: Joe Dawes (49) (Queensland)

The 2000–01 Sheffield Shield season known as the Pura Cup was the 99th season of the Sheffield Shield, the domestic first-class cricket competition of Australia. Queensland won the championship.

== Table ==
Team	Played	Won	Lost	Tied	Drawn	N/R	Points
Queensland	10	6	1	0	3	0	40
Victoria	10	4	3	0	3	0	32
Tasmania	10	3	4	0	3	0	22
New South Wales	10	3	3	0	3	1	22
Western Australia	10	2	4	0	4	0	16
South Australia	10	2	5	0	2	1	14

== Final ==
23–27 March 2001
Scorecard

Victoria	v	Queensland (H)
176 (75.4 overs); Jason Arnberger 63 (199); Ashley Noffke 5/41 (18 overs)		242 (99 overs); Clinton Perren 56 (103); Mick Lewis 5/57 (23 overs)
289 (132.4 overs); Matthew Elliott 98* (340); Andy Bichel 4/44 (30.4 overs)		6/224 (80.3 overs); Martin Love 52 (144); Mathew Inness 3/48 (25 overs)

Queensland won by 4 wickets
Venue: The Gabba, Brisbane
Umpires: Simon Taufel and Steve Davis
Player of the match: Ashley Noffke (Queensland)

- Victoria won the toss and elected to bat.

== Statistics ==
=== Most runs ===
Player	Team	Mat	Inns	NO	Runs	Ave	HS	100	50
Greg Blewett	South Australia	9	18	1	1162	68.35	260*	3	6
Simon Katich	Western Australia	10	19	3	1145	71.56	228*	6	2
Jamie Cox	Tasmania	10	19	3	1070	66.87	160	5	3
Brad Hodge	Victoria	11	20	2	973	54.05	125	4	3
Jimmy Maher	Queensland	11	19	3	946	59.12	175	3	3

=== Most wickets ===
Player	Team	Mat	Inns	Overs	Wkts	Ave	Econ	BBI	BBM	5	10
Joe Dawes	Queensland	9	17	358.3	49	20.46	2.79	7/98	10/141	3	1
Adam Dale	Queensland	11	20	570.3	46	23.39	1.88	5/37	9/115	2	0
Andy Bichel	Queensland	7	13	318.2	40	21.80	2.73	5/74	9/231	2	0
Jo Angel	Western Australia	9	17	333.3	37	23.43	2.59	5/78	6/103	1	0
Matthew Inness	Victoria	11	21	341.0	33	27.57	2.66	6/26	8/58	1	0
