= Slog =

Type of shot in cricket

Slog is an unorthodox cricket shot where the batsman attempts to hit the ball as far as possible with the aim to hit a six or at the least a four. It is a dangerous shot to play since the ball is almost certainly going to be in the air for a long period of time and great technique and power is required from the batsman to actually clear the field.

The word 'slog' carries a negative connotation, as it implies 'power hitting over grace and correct technique'.

When playing a 'Slog', a batsman is likely to want to score quickly therefore it is likely to be used in a Twenty20, Pro40 or one day match. A slog can also be useful in test cricket if a team has a good lead and needs to declare so it has as much time as possible to bowl the opposition players out. The slog can be risky. Firstly there is a high possibility of missing the ball with the bat and simply getting bowled. LBWs are also common when playing the slog but if contact is made there is no guarantee that the ball will simply not loop up to a fielder. A slog is therefore likely to be played in times of desperation when runs are required extremely quickly or in variations of the game such as 'Plank Cricket' where continuous defensive shots are frowned upon and may even result in disqualification. Slog sweep is one of the most commonly played cricketing shots.
