= 2001–02 Australia Tri-Nation Series =

International cricket competition

2001–02 VB Series
- Date: 11 January 2002 – 8 February 2002
- Location: Australia
- Result: Won by South Africa; 2–0 in final series
- Player of the series: Shane Bond
Teams
Australia	New Zealand	South Africa
Captains
Steve Waugh	Stephen Fleming	Shaun Pollock
Most runs
Ponting 254 Bevan 251 Martyn 226	Cairns 314; Fleming 309; McMillan 275	Rhodes 345; Kallis 322; Gibbs 293
Most wickets
McGrath 14 Bichel 8 Lee 8	Bond 21; Cairns 12; Harris 8	Ntini 14; Pollock 13; Donald 12

The 2001–02 Australia Tri-Nation Series (more commonly as the 2001–02 VB Series) was a One Day International (ODI) cricket tri-series (14 matches) where Australia played host to New Zealand and South Africa. After drawing with New Zealand and defeating South Africa in the preceding Test series, Australia went into the tournament as favourites. However, they failed to reach the final, and captain Steve Waugh was consequently sacked as ODI captain, replaced by Ricky Ponting.

South African Jonty Rhodes was the leading run-scorer for the series, while New Zealander Shane Bond was the leading wicket-taker.

== Squads ==
Squads
Australia	New Zealand	South Africa
Steve Waugh (c)	Stephen Fleming (c)	Shaun Pollock (c)
Adam Gilchrist (wk)	Adam Parore (wk)	Mark Boucher (wk)
Ryan Campbell (wk)	Andre Adams	Nicky Boje
Michael Bevan	Nathan Astle	Boeta Dippenaar
Andy Bichel	Shane Bond	Allan Donald
Jason Gillespie	Chris Cairns	Steve Elworthy
Ian Harvey	James Franklin	Herschelle Gibbs
Matthew Hayden	Chris Harris	Jacques Kallis
Brett Lee	Brendon McCullum	Justin Kemp
Darren Lehmann	Craig McMillan	Gary Kirsten
Glenn McGrath	Dion Nash	Lance Klusener
Damien Martyn	Mark Richardson	Charl Langeveldt
Ricky Ponting	Scott Styris	Neil McKenzie
Andrew Symonds	Daniel Vettori	Makhaya Ntini
Shane Warne	Lou Vincent	Justin Ontong
Mark Waugh	–	Jonty Rhodes
Brad Williams	–	–

== Points table ==
Pos	Team	P	W	L	NR/T	BP	Points	NRR
1	South Africa	8	4	4	0	2	18	-0.040
2	New Zealand	8	4	4	0	1	17	-0.154
3	Australia	8	4	4	0	1	17	+0.186

=== Points system ===
- Won = 4 points
- Lost = 0 points
- Tie or No result = 2 points
- BP = Bonus points.

1 bonus point was awarded to the winning team if their run rate was 1.25x than that of the losing team.

- Standard net run rate rules applied.
- In the event of the teams finishing on equal points, the right to play in the final match (or series) will be determined as follows:

the team with the most number of wins
the team with the most number of wins over the other team(s).
the team with the highest number of bonus points
the team with the highest net run rate.

== Group stage ==
=== 1st match: Australia v New Zealand ===
11 January 2002
14:30 (D/N)
(scorecard)

New Zealand; 8/199 (50 overs)	v	Australia; 176 (42 overs)
Harris 63* (92); Lee 3–43 (10 overs)		Ponting 45 (54); Bond 3–53 (10 overs)

New Zealand won by 23 runs
Melbourne Cricket Ground, Melbourne
Umpires: Darrell Hair (AUS) & Bob Parry (Aus)
Player of the match: (New Zealand) Chris Harris

=== 2nd match: Australia v South Africa ===
13 January 2002
14:30 (D/N)
(scorecard)

Australia; 198 (48.5 overs)	v	South Africa; 6/199 (48.3 overs)
S.Waugh 62 (86); Pollock 3–25 (9 overs)		Rhodes 43* (101); Gillespie 2–28 (10 overs)

South Africa won by 4 wickets
Melbourne Cricket Ground, Melbourne
Umpires: Steve Davis (AUS) & Simon Taufel (Aus)
Player of the match: (South Africa) Shaun Pollock

=== 3rd match: New Zealand v South Africa ===
15 January 2002
10:00
(scorecard)

South Africa; 7/257 (50 overs)	v	New Zealand; 9/231 (50 overs)
Gary Kirsten 97 (118); Daniel Vettori 2–37 (10 overs)		Stephen Fleming 85 (112); Allan Donald 3–40 (10 overs)

South Africa won by 26 runs
Bellerive Oval, Hobart
Umpires: Steve Davis (AUS) & Daryl Harper (Aus)
Player of the match: (South Africa) Gary Kirsten

=== 4th match: Australia v New Zealand ===
17 January 2002
14:30 (D/N)
(scorecard)

New Zealand; 9/235 (50 overs)	v	Australia; 212 (47.2 overs)
Harris 42* (43); Harvey 2–40 (10 overs)		Bevan 66 (98); Harris 3–37 (8.2 overs)

New Zealand won by 23 runs
Sydney Cricket Ground, Sydney
Umpires: Bob Parry (AUS) & Simon Taufel (Aus)
Player of the match: (New Zealand) Chris Harris

=== 5th match: New Zealand v South Africa ===
19 January 2002
13:30 (D/N)
(scorecard)

South Africa; 241 (48.3 overs)	v	New Zealand; 6/244 (49.1 overs)
Kallis 65 (68); Bond 4–37 (9.3 overs)		Cairns 102* (99); Pollock 2–29 (9.1 overs)

New Zealand won by 4 wickets
The Gabba, Brisbane
Umpires: Steve Davis (AUS) & Darrell Hair (Aus)
Player of the match: (New Zealand) Chris Cairns

=== 6th match: Australia v South Africa ===
20 January 2002
13:30 (D/N)
(scorecard)

Australia; 4/241 (50 overs)	v	South Africa; 214 (48.4 overs)
Martyn 104* (121); Elworthy 2–53 (10 overs)		McKenzie 68 (85); McGrath 4–30 (9.4 overs)

Australia won by 27 runs
The Gabba, Brisbane
Umpires: Daryl Harper (AUS) & Simon Taufel (Aus)
Player of the match: (Australia) Damien Martyn

=== 7th match: Australia v South Africa ===
22 January 2002
14:30 (D/N)
(scorecard)

South Africa; 106 (38.3 overs)	v	Australia; 2/107 (18.4 overs)
Kirsten 44 (77); Bichel 5–19 (6.3 overs)		M.Waugh 55* (62); Klusener 1–28 (2.4 overs)

Australia won by 8 wickets
Sydney Cricket Ground, Sydney
Umpires: Darrell Hair (AUS) & Daryl Harper (AUS)
Player of the match: (Australia) Andy Bichel

=== 8th match: Australia v New Zealand ===
26 January 2002
14:00 (D/N)
(scorecard)

New Zealand; 5/242 (50 overs)	v	Australia; 165 (50 overs)
Astle 95 (135); McGrath 2–36 (10 overs)		Bevan 45 (62); Bond 5–25 (9.2 overs)

New Zealand won by 77 runs
Adelaide Oval, Adelaide
Umpires: Steve Davis (AUS) & Simon Taufel (Aus)
Player of the match: (New Zealand) Shane Bond

=== 9th match: New Zealand v South Africa ===
27 January 2002
14:00 (D/N)
(scorecard)

South Africa; 5/253 (50 overs)	v	New Zealand; 160 (50 overs)
Gibbs 89 (132); Cairns 2–69 (10 overs)		Fleming 43 (80); Boje 4–31 (10 overs)

South Africa won by 93 runs
Adelaide Oval, Adelaide
Umpires: Daryl Harper (AUS) & Bob Parry (Aus)
Player of the match: (South Africa) Mark Boucher

=== 10th Match: Australia v New Zealand ===
29 January 2002
14:30 (D/N)
(scorecard)

New Zealand; 8/245 (50 overs)	v	Australia; 8/248 (49.3 overs)
Cairns 55 (63); McGrath 2–41 (10 overs)		Bevan 102* (95); Bond 4–38 (9.3 overs)

Australia won by 2 wickets
Melbourne Cricket Ground, Melbourne
Umpires: Darrell Hair (AUS) & Simon Taufel (Aus)
Player of the match: (Australia) Michael Bevan

=== 11th Match: New Zealand v South Africa ===
1 February 2002
10:30
(scorecard)

South Africa; 5/270 (50 overs)	v	New Zealand; 8/203 (50 overs)
Rhodes 107* (135); Nash 3–37 (10 overs)		McMillan 46 (54); Ntini 2–23 (10 overs)

South Africa won by 67 runs
WACA Ground, Perth
Umpires: Darrell Hair (AUS) & Daryl Harper (Aus)
Player of the match: (South Africa) Jonty Rhodes

=== 12th Match: Australia v South Africa ===
3 February 2002
10:30
(scorecard)

Australia; 7/283 (50 overs)	v	South Africa; 5/250 (50 overs)
Lee 51* (36); Boje 2–38 (10 overs)		Kallis 104* (120); Lehmann 2–28 (5 overs)

Australia won by 33 runs
WACA Ground, Perth
Umpires: Steve Davis (AUS) & Bob Parry (Aus)
Player of the match: (South Africa) Jacques Kallis

Australia needed a bonus point against South Africa to qualify for the finals. They lost the toss and were sent in to bat; however, they struggled early and were 7/195 in the 40th over, before Brett Lee scored 51 from 36 balls. Australia finished on 7/283, consequently needing to restrict South Africa to less than 227 to gain the bonus point. Nevertheless, it was not to be for the Australians, as Jacques Kallis compiled an unbeaten century (104), helping South Africa reach 227 with 16 balls to spare. They eventually finished on 250, and despite an Australian victory, the local team were out of the competition, upsetting many home fans. Australian captain Steve Waugh wrote:

A lot has been said about the rights and wrongs of the bonus point system that ended up separating the three teams on the final ladder for the VB series, but much of it ignores one simple reason behind our early exit from the tournament. We were slow out of the blocks and we paid for it ... with the short time between the end of the Test series and the start of the VB series, there was no chance for a lead-up game, our opponents enjoyed, and without such a rehearsal we lacked the sharpness required at the top level in our first three games, we found ourselves under the pump.

== Finals ==
=== 1st final ===
6 February 2002
(scorecard)

New Zealand; 190 (47.5 overs)	v	South Africa; 2/191 (45.1 overs)
McMillan 73 (99); Ntini 5–31 (10 overs)		Dippenaar 79* (107); Cairns 1–27 (8 overs)

South Africa won by 8 wickets
Melbourne Cricket Ground, Melbourne
Umpires: Daryl Harper (AUS) & Simon Taufel (Aus)
Player of the match: (South Africa) Makhaya Ntini

South Africa continued their good form against New Zealand with a comfortable eight wicket win, set up by a strong bowling performance from Makhaya Ntini. Despite winning the toss and opting to bat, New Zealand lost both of their openers early, to Ntini. However, a 109 wicket partnership between Stephen Fleming and Craig McMillan put the innings back on track. Once Lance Klusener dismissed the New Zealand captain for 50, they began to lose wickets regularly, with only Andre Adams making it into double figures. Ntini took the wicket of Adams to claim his second ODI five wicket haul and the innings was soon closed when Shane Bond was run-out by Jonty Rhodes. South Africa in reply lost their second wicket with 52 runs on the board but Boeta Dippenaar, who was dropped in the gully by Fleming on 40, and Jacques Kallis, guided South Africa to victory with 29 balls remaining.

=== 2nd final ===
8 February 2002
(scorecard)

New Zealand; 175 (41.1 overs)	v	South Africa; 4/173 (38.1 overs)
Cairns 57 (73); Kallis 3–23 (5.1 overs)		Rhodes 61* (68); Adams 2–33 (8 overs)

South Africa won by 6 wickets (D/L method)
Sydney Cricket Ground, Sydney
Umpires: Steve Davis (AUS) & Simon Taufel (Aus)
Player of the match: (South Africa) Jonty Rhodes

- Rain interrupted the New Zealand innings after 16.1 overs which reduced the match to 46 overs each

Having won the toss again, Stephen Fleming elected to bat first but once more New Zealand failed to produce a competitive total and South Africa chased it down comfortably. The New Zealanders, needing a win to force the finals series into a third match, had started their innings slowly and it wasn't until the fifth over that they scored their maiden run. An entertaining run a ball 43 from Lou Vincent got the team back on track but after he fell and Jacques Kallis dismissed Craig McMillan, New Zealand were struggling at 5/72. Although a 75 run partnership from Chris Cairns and Chris Harris looked like giving New Zealand a chance of posting over 200, the tail fell cheaply due to good bowling from Allan Donald. During their innings, the match had been reduced to 46 overs due to rain and the South Africans were thus chasing a revised target of 172. Herschelle Gibbs, despite losing his opening partner Gary Kirsten for just two runs, scored an aggressive 46 to give the South Africans a good platform. Jonty Rhodes brought up his half century and accumulated 16 runs in the 38th over, bowled by Andre Adams, before a pull to the boundary by Mark Boucher off Daniel Vettori the following over gave South Africa the title.

== Aftermath ==
Australian cricket team captain Steve Waugh was dropped from the One Day International team after the conclusion of the series, and the captaincy role was assumed by Ricky Ponting. However, he continued the Test captaincy until his International retirement in January 2004, with Ponting becoming Australia's full-time captain.
