= Cameron White =

Australian cricketer (born 1983)

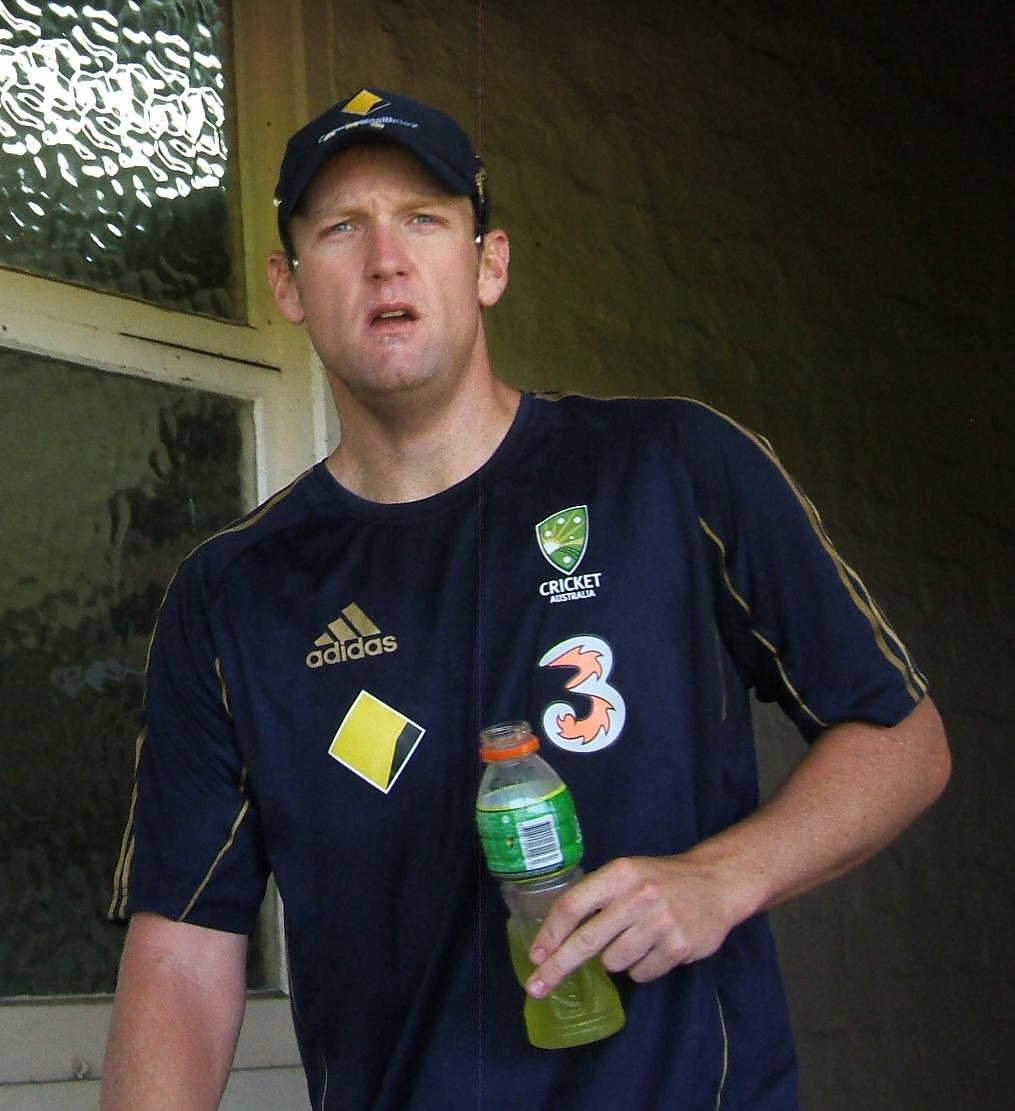

Personal information
- Full name: Cameron Leon White
- Born: 18 August 1983 (age 43); Bairnsdale, Victoria, Australia
- Nickname: Whitey, Bear, Bundy
- Height: 1.87 m (6 ft 2 in)
- Batting: Right-handed
- Bowling: Right-arm leg break
- Role: Middle-order batter

International information
- National side: Australia (2005–2018)
- Test debut (cap 402): 9 October 2008 v India
- Last Test: 6 November 2008 v India
- ODI debut (cap 152): 5 October 2005 v World XI
- Last ODI: 21 January 2018 v England
- ODI shirt no.: 7
- T20I debut (cap 22): 9 January 2007 v England
- Last T20I: 9 November 2014 v South Africa
- T20I shirt no.: 7

Domestic team information
- Years: Team
- 2000/01–2018/19: Victoria (squad no. 9)
- 2006–2007: Somerset (squad no. 3)
- 2008–2010: Royal Challengers Bangalore (squad no. 18)
- 2011–2012: Deccan Chargers (squad no. 7)
- 2011/12–2014/15: Melbourne Stars (squad no. 9)
- 2012–2013: Northamptonshire (squad no. 4)
- 2013: Sunrisers Hyderabad (squad no. 9)
- 2015/16–2018/19: Melbourne Renegades (squad no. 7)
- 2019/20: Adelaide Strikers (squad no. 7)

Career statistics
Competition	Test	ODI	FC	LA
Matches	4	91	177	269
Runs scored	146	2,072	10,537	7,703
Batting average	29.20	33.97	39.91	37.57
100s/50s	0/0	2/11	22/55	13/45
Top score	46	105	260*	165
Balls bowled	558	331	13,754	4,136
Wickets	5	12	195	104
Bowling average	68.40	29.25	41.37	35.85
5 wickets in innings	0	0	3	0
10 wickets in match	0	0	1	0
Best bowling	2/71	3/5	6/66	4/15
Catches/stumpings	1/–	37/–	207/–	123/–
- Source: ESPNcricinfo, 2 April 2019

Cameron Leon White (born 18 August 1983) is an Australian former international cricketer who captained the national side in Twenty20 Internationals. A powerful middle order batsman and right-arm leg-spin bowler, White made his first-class cricket debut as a teenager in the 2000–01 season for the Victoria cricket team as a bowling all-rounder. During his time with Australia, White won the 2009 ICC Champions Trophy.

In 2003–04, he became Victoria's youngest ever captain at the age of 20 when he took over leadership of their one-day side, and the first-class captaincy followed the season after. International recognition came for the first time in 2005, but White found himself in and out of the side as the selectors and national captain Ricky Ponting looked for White to improve his bowling to play as a front-line spinner. Two successful winters with English county side Somerset helped to propel White back into the selectors' minds. White had a short Test career playing four Test matches in 2008.

His tenure as T20 captain ended with the 2012 series against India where he was dropped following poor form in the Big Bash League. He was succeeded by Melbourne Stars teammate George Bailey. His nickname of "Bear" is due to his purported resemblance to the polar bear mascot of Bundaberg Rum. White retired from professional cricket in August 2020.

== Career ==
=== Early career ===
White began his cricket career working his way through the youth structure at Victoria, playing in the Commonwealth Bank Under-17, and later Under-19 Championship series. He showed his prowess with both bat and ball during these competitions, claiming a century, two half-centuries and 17 wickets in the ten matches he played over two seasons. He tended to bat as part of the middle order and bowl as third or fourth change. His first-class debut came in March 2001, aged 17, against New South Wales. Batting at number nine, White scored 11 runs in his only batting inning of the match, and claimed 4/65 (Note: 4/65: White claimed four wickets and 65 runs were scored while he was bowling.) coming on as third change bowler. He made one further first-class appearance that season before joining up with the Australian Under-19 cricket team for two youth tests against Sri Lanka.

He captained the AIS Australia Cricket Academy side that toured New Zealand, beating the New Zealand Academy side 3–1 in a four-match one-day series, after a pair of draws in two three-day matches. Soon after, he made his List A debut for Victoria, but the match was rained off after 42.1 overs without White taking any part in the match. White received his first senior man of the match award a few days later for his two wickets and score of 91 batting at number seven during the Pura Cup match against South Australia. He was named as captain of the Australian Under-19 squad to compete in the 2002 Under-19 Cricket World Cup in New Zealand, and led his team to victory in the competition, beating South Africa by seven wickets in the final. White finished the tournament as the leading run-scorer with 423 runs, with two of the other top-four batsmen also being Australian.

Despite his success with the bat during the Under-19 World Cup, Victoria continued to use White as a bowling all-rounder, a decision that seemed to be justified in the 2002–03 season when White passed 50 just once in his 13 first-class innings and claimed 28 wickets. In his last match of the season, he claimed his maiden five-wicket haul and ten-wicket haul, taking 6/66 in the first-innings against Western Australia and 4/70 in the second-innings to help Victoria to a 10 wicket victory.

=== Youngest ever captain ===
Following a season which had seen Darren Berry and Shane Warne share the captaincy of Victoria's ING Cup side, the Victoria selectors appointed White as the captain for the 2003–04 season. Aged only 20, White became the youngest player to captain the Victoria state side in its 152-year history to that point. His coach, David Hookes, said that "White has shown at a young age a successful understanding of captaining a team". The decision was supported by the reports that during the Under-19 World Cup, he captained the side with "flair, control and maturity far beyond his years". White was also called upon to captain the first-class side early in the 2003–04 season, after regular captain Berry broke his finger during a practice match.

After a win and a loss while captaining the ING Cup side, White was named man of the match on his debut as Pura Cup captain, taking six wickets to lead Victoria to a five wicket victory over Queensland.

White was given his first taste of international cricket in December 2003. Having taken four Indian wickets during a tour match for Victoria, White was selected to play for Australia A against the same opposition later in the tour. Batting at number six in an Australian side that also included Victoria teammate Brad Hodge, and was captained by Michael Hussey, White made little impression on the Indians, making just 20 runs in his two innings and taking no wickets. White retained his place in the A side to face Zimbabwe in two 50-over contests, claiming two wickets.

The 2003–04 season saw White's batting improve markedly in first-class cricket but he tore some ligaments in his right leg, therefore ending his 2003–04 season. A return of five half-centuries in eighteen innings saw his season average finish in excess of 30 for the first time. He also claimed 30 wickets in the season, the most in a single season in his career to date, although his average suffered compared with the previous season, rising to over 35. A couple of cameo innings also indicated what was to come, 58 runs off 65 balls against Western Australia, and 75 runs off 97 balls against South Australia, an innings that included 7 fours and 3 sixes, showcased the strengths that would later see White shine in the shorter Twenty20 format of the game.

These improvements in White's game, and an injury to Stuart MacGill, saw White named as part of the 13-man Australia Test squad to tour Zimbabwe. With the Australia selectors keen to take two spinners on the tour, MacGill's injury allowed them to select White "with a view to the future." A tour match against Zimbabwe A brought a wicket for White, but he was denied the chance of making his Test debut when the two-match series was called off due to disputes between the Zimbabwe cricket board and their rebel players. White described the decision as a missed opportunity "to see how everything went and how an international Test match is played".

The 2003–04 season had been capped by victory in the Pura Cup following a 321 victory over Queensland in the final, in which White made a half-century and claimed five of the oppositions wickets. Victoria captain Berry retired from professional cricket after the triumph, and White was named as his replacement for 2004–05. White was pleased with the appointment, saying that the captaincy "brings out the best in my game and the extra responsibility is good for me". In December 2004, White made his maiden first-class century, making 119 after Victoria were forced to follow-on against Queensland. His partnership of 205 with Ian Harvey, a record seventh-wicket partnership for Victoria, and 152 from opener Jason Arnberger helped Victoria recover to a second-innings total of 508/8 declared. A fine bowling performance then saw Queensland bowled out for just 169, capping a "remarkable fightback" by Victoria.

=== International breakthrough ===
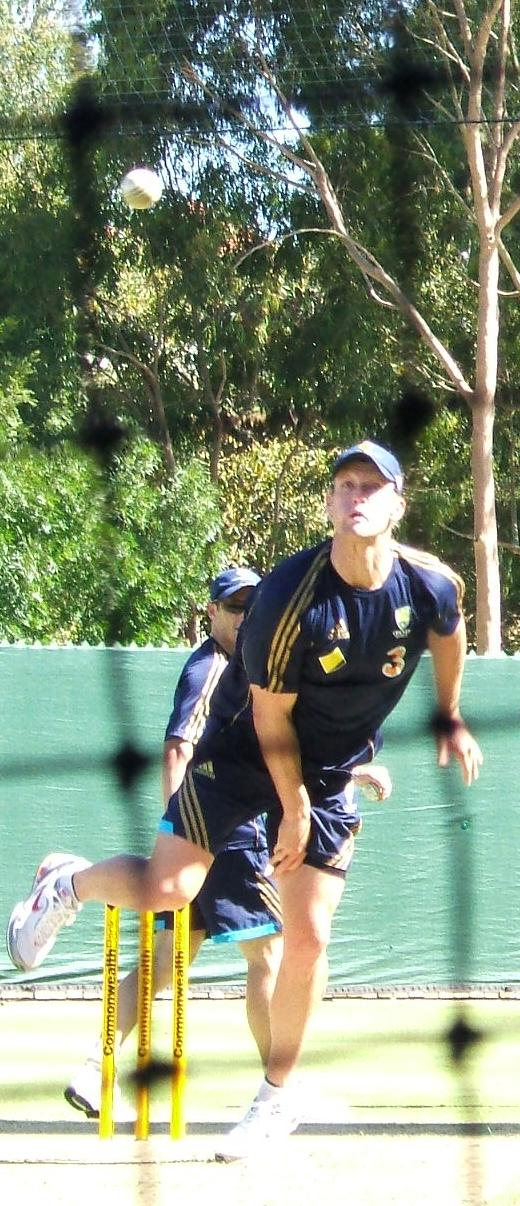
White bowling in the Adelaide Oval nets, January 2009.

During his early career, parallels were drawn Victoria teammate Shane Warne; both were blonde, and both were leg-spinners. It was soon apparent that he did not have the ability to turn the ball as much as Warne, his style being described as more reminiscent of Anil Kumble instead. Midway through the 2004–05 season, White played four matches for Australia A against the touring West Indians and Pakistanis. Three 50-over matches brought him two half-centuries and a duck, and his first experience of Twenty20 cricket resulted in an unbeaten 58 with a strike rate over 150. Victoria did not qualify for either Pura Cup or ING Cup finals, but White's improvement was again significant; his first-class averages remained roughly the same as in the previous season, but he more than doubled his previous best season batting average in one-day cricket, passing 30 in the format.

After his impressive form for Australia A during January 2005, White was selected as part of the Australia A side to tour Pakistan in September that year. After claiming four wickets, and averaging 35.50 with the bat in the 2 four-day matches, White shone in the subsequent one-day games. Not required to bat in the first, he then scored 106 not out in the second and 59 not out in the third, also claiming a tail-end wicket. Having now demonstrated his ability as a big-hitting all-rounder, White was selected to make his international debut during the 2005 ICC Super Series against the ICC World XI. Shaun Pollock, captaining the World XI team, said that his batsmen would target the young leg-spinner, but Australia captain Ricky Ponting said he expected White to bowl, after he'd "handled things well in the Victoria game against them". He was named as supersub in the first two matches, being on field only during the ICC World XI innings, therefore being unable to bat. He did not bowl in the first match, and only bowled three wicket-less overs in the second. Despite controversy regarding the official status of the matches, these two appearances as supersub signified White's first two One Day International (ODI) appearances. He started the third match, but as Australia closed their innings on 293/5, White was again not required to bat, nor did he bowl in the following ICC World XI innings.

White was named as a bowling supersub again for the first ODI of the Chappell–Hadlee Trophy, replacing Katich at the start of the New Zealand innings. He bowled one wicket-less over, conceding four runs. After missing out on the second match, White returned for the third, getting the opportunity to bat for the first time. He was dismissed for a golden duck, falling to Chris Martin first ball. In the New Zealand innings, he claimed his first senior international wicket, bowling Hamish Marshall.

=== International contract not renewed ===
2005–06 was the first season that Twenty20 cricket was played domestically in Australia, and White with his Victoria team were the quickest to adapt to the new format. White earned a man of the match award in his first match in the tournament, scoring 45 runs off 32 balls and claiming a single wicket. Two wickets followed in the second match, and a second victory granted Victoria a place in the final. Facing New South Wales in the final, White added 46 off 16 balls, scoring at almost three runs a ball. He claimed 3/8 in the following innings, helping to restrict New South Wales to 140, giving Victoria the championship title. White finished the tournament with 99 runs, second only to Brad Hodge, and 6 wickets, trailing only Shane Harwood, both Victoria teammates.

In April 2006, White joined up with English county side Somerset for the first match of the County Championship. After Somerset were forced to follow-on by Gloucestershire, White came in at number five and scored 172 runs off 228 balls before finally being caught off the bowling of former Victoria teammate Ian Harvey. Despite this innings, Somerset only managed a team total of 287, and lost the match by an innings and seven runs. Two weeks later, on 1 May, Cricket Australia announced that along with James Hopes and Mick Lewis, Cameron White's national contract would not be renewed for the next 12 months. When Somerset captain Ian Blackwell suffered a shoulder injury that put him out of the game for three months, White was named as his replacement. As with Australia Under-19s and Victoria, the added responsibility seemed to improve his game. A score of 109* (Note: * is used to signify that White remained not out at the close of his team's innings.) against Glamorgan in the 50-over Cheltenham & Gloucester Trophy was followed immediately by 131* in the County Championship against Worcestershire, a half-century against the touring Sri Lankans and then a second-innings 108 against Surrey, all made in the first half of June.

The Twenty20 Cup gave White another chance to display his skills in the shortest format of the game. White was joined at Somerset by fellow Australian Justin Langer for the tournament, and the pair shone in Somerset's opening match of the competition. Opening the innings, Langer made 90 runs off 46 balls, but was outscored and outpaced by White's 116*, scored at more than two runs a ball. The century was White's first in Twenty20 cricket, and he capped off his performance by claiming Gloucestershire's tenth wicket to wrap up a 117 run victory. Just under two weeks later, White surpassed this score, at the time the joint highest made in Twenty20 cricket, with 141* against Worcestershire. His runs, made off 70 balls, set a new world record Twenty20 total that would stand for almost two years before being beaten by Brendon McCullum. He finished the competition with the leading batting average, and his 403 runs trailed only teammate Langer's 464 and Leicestershire batsman Hylton Ackerman's 409.

In August, with Somerset slumping, White scored back-to-back fourth-innings centuries in the County Championship, but neither could rescue his side from defeat. First, he made 111 against Essex, and then under a week later, he made the highest individual score in the fourth-innings of a first-class match by remaining 260 not out at the close of Somerset's innings as Derbyshire beat them to record their first home win in four years. Despite Somerset finishing bottom of Division Two of the County Championship, White had his most successful season of cricket in his career to that point. Having made his highest score, and hit five centuries in first-class cricket, his batting average was almost 60, and his one-day batting average exceeded 40.

=== One Day International cricket 2006–07 ===
A strong start to the 2006–07 Australian domestic season, exemplified by 150* against Tasmania in the Pura Cup and 126* against New South Wales in the Ford Ranger Cup (previously ING Cup) saw White recalled to the Australia one-day squad. Chief of selectors, Andrew Hilditch described his inclusion in the squad, praising his "great form with the bat and [he] has had some terrific performances with the ball". In an interview with Australian newspaper The Age, White professed his relief at returning to the international scene, stating that "I don't really care if I get picked as a batting allrounder or a bowling allrounder, or just as a bat or bowler, as long as I get picked." An international Twenty20 against England saw White rewarded with a man of the match award for his 40* off 20 balls, and 1/11 with the ball in hand. In his next batting innings, White scored 45 runs including 3 sixes against New Zealand, leading teammate Andrew Symonds to praise his ability to strike the cricket ball, saying that "when you've got that going on at the other end, it makes it a lot easier for me". Despite his excellent form with the bat, White's bowling was proving to be mostly ineffective. For this reason, as well as the improved form of Brad Hodge and the selection of Brad Hogg and Shane Watson for their ability with the ball, he was dropped for the finals of the Commonwealth Bank Series and left out of the World Cup squad.

Despite not being named in the World Cup squad, White played all three ODIs in the Chappell–Hadlee Trophy against New Zealand. This was because some of the senior players were rested ahead of the World Cup, or sustained injuries. Stand-in captain Michael Hussey only called upon him to bowl three overs during the series, all in the second match, in which he was expensive, conceding almost 10 runs an over. He hit a quick 42* in that match, scoring six boundaries including 3 sixes. He was less impressive with the bat in the other two matches, making 13 on both occasions.

=== Another domestic year ===
White returned to the Victoria side in time to captain his team in the Ford Ranger Cup final, which they lost to Queensland by 21 runs. Two Pura Cup matches brought a couple of wickets and 96 runs, and then a month's break before his first match back in England, where he returned to Somerset for a second season. He was among the runs immediately, one of eight centurions as Somerset played Middlesex. Fellow Australian Langer, also returning to Somerset made 315, and White added 114 as Somerset eventually reached 850/7 declared. White scored three more half-centuries before the month was out, and in the first match of May, was one of four Australians to reach three figures as Somerset hosted Derbyshire. Against Gloucestershire, he again showed his ability to remain calm and keep scoring even as those around him fell, making 241 in a Somerset first-innings in which James Hildreth was the only other player to pass 50. White passed 1,000 runs in the County Championship for the second time, and his batting average topped 70 as Somerset won promotion from Division Two, a turnaround from the previous season when they had finished bottom of the division, 'winning' the competition's wooden spoon. The season also saw a slight improvement in White's bowling, his 20 first-class wickets coming at an average of 32.75, his best in a domestic season. Despite his impressive season, due to English counties only being allowed one overseas player for the 2008 season, White did not see his contract with the county renewed, Somerset preferring to keep captain Justin Langer. Somerset's Director of Cricket, Brian Rose paid tribute to White, saying "It was a difficult choice with the new ruling about only one overseas player because Cameron has also done tremendous things for us."

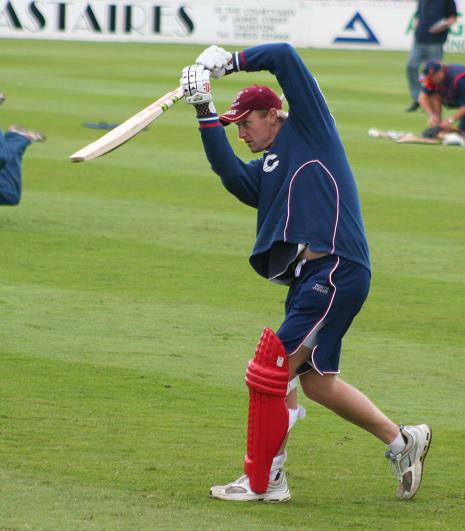
White warming up for a Twenty20 match for Somerset, 2007

It was on the back of this form that White once again toured Pakistan with the Australia A squad, but he finished the series with just two wickets, both coming in the first-class matches, and a handful of runs. Two months into the Australian domestic season, White was forced to retire hurt after colliding with Queensland bowler Lee Carseldine, and after the match it was revealed he'd fractured his foot. He'd been carrying the injury since the start of the season, and the collision led to a full break, putting White out for six weeks. White conceded that the injury would almost certainly rule out any chance he had of playing for the national team that summer. He returned in early January, playing the last three matches of the Twenty20 tournament, including the final which Victoria won by 32 runs, although White only managed to make one run off eight balls. For the second season in a row, White was named as captain of the Prime Minister's XI, and claimed two Sri Lankan wickets in the 50-over contest. White led Victoria to both Pura Cup and Ford Ranger Cup finals in 2007–08, but they lost both, to New South Wales and Tasmania respectively.

The auction for the inaugural season of the Indian Premier League (IPL) saw the majority of the world's cricketing talent up for sale in a very public forum. For the thirteen Australians on offer, this was in sharp contrast to the secrecy which surrounded the value of national contracts. White was finally sold for $500,000 to the Royal Challengers Bangalore, $50,000 more than Shane Warne fetched, and more again than Ricky Ponting, Matthew Hayden and Michael Hussey. The apparent discrepancy was in part due to the possibility that international involvement could rule Australia's Test players out of much, if not all of the first two years of the tournament. Rahul Dravid, Bangalore's 'icon' player, described White as an exciting addition, saying "White is a very exciting Twenty20 player and his domestic record [with two Twenty20 hundreds] in Australia is phenomenal." Despite his price, White had a largely disappointing time in his only IPL season. He finished the tournament with 114 runs, over 500 less than fellow Australian and the competition's leading run-scorer Shaun Marsh. Cameron White holds the record for the highest individual score in a T20 as captain (141*).

=== On the international fringes ===
White was recalled to the Australian ODI and Twenty20 squads for the 2008 tour of the West Indies. He scored 10 runs off 6 balls in a rain-reduced 11-over Twenty20 contest, and in a 50-over tour match against University of West Indies Vice-Chancellor's XI, made 34 but remained wicket-less in his eight overs with the ball. By this stage in his career, White was generally considered a middle-order batsman who bowled a bit, but Australia captain Ponting saw his place in the team as that of the front-line spinner. "White's obviously been picked as the spinner on this tour. We just need to keep exposing him to different situations and putting him under a bit more pressure. Hopefully he plays a big role for us during the series." Despite Ponting's comments, he used White as the fourth-change bowler in the first ODI, bringing the slow left-arm spin of Michael Clarke on first. White conceded 32 runs in his six overs without a breakthrough, and did not bowl at all in the second match, as Clarke claimed the man of the match award for his half-century and three wickets. Although White scored 40* at quicker than a run a ball, the return of Andrew Symonds for the last three ODIs left White out of the team again.

It was the absence of Symonds, sent home from the 2008–09 series against Bangladesh for skipping a team meeting to go fishing, that gave White another opportunity in the ODI team. Although stand-in captain Clarke mirrored the action of Ponting by bringing himself on before the Victoria captain, White claimed a career-best three wickets for five runs off the 10 balls he bowled. After the match, White admitted he had to prove he could deal with the pressures of international cricket, but was upbeat, saying "it was nice to get a few wickets but it would have been nice to get a few overs under the belt as well." He claimed two more wickets in the second match and, after not being required to bowl in the third, finished the series with an average under 10.

He was selected as captain of the Australia A team to compete against New Zealand A and India A in a tri-series hosted by India. The captaincy gave White an opportunity to give himself plenty of overs, in total he bowled over 30 overs, claiming eight wickets in the competition, second only to Piyush Chawla. He displayed his all-round ability by finishing with the fifth highest batting average and leading his team to the final, in which they beat India A by 156 runs.

When Symonds was dropped from the tour of India due to disciplinary issues, Greg Shipperd, White's coach at Victoria, claimed that White should have been called up rather than Watson, claiming that the leg-spinner "looked ideal to fill the aggressive role vacated by Symonds – he is a great counter-puncher". When fellow Victorian leg-spinner Bryce McGain left the tour injured, White got the call-up to the Test squad that Shipperd felt he deserved, although he was nominally selected as a specialist bowler. After Jason Krejza, the other spinner on the tour, conceded 199 runs for no wickets in a match against the Board President's XI, White was considered the safer option, although Ponting publicly endorsed Krejza after his wicket-less match. Despite Ponting's apparent leanings, White was preferred, and became the 402nd Australian to receive his Test cap. He was selected to bat at number eight, usually a specialist bowler's position, despite generally playing first-class cricket as a batsman.

At the end of the first Test, in which White took the solitary wicket of Sachin Tendulkar, Ponting said "He's come along in leaps and bounds in his bowling. He's probably exceeded my expectations with what he's done, although he did not take the wickets." White improved his return in the second Test, claiming three wickets, but only took one more in the last two matches. Although Ponting extolled White in public, he once again often opted to use the part-time spin of Clarke before and more frequently than White throughout the series. White's five wickets on the tour came at a bowling average of almost 70, and with Symonds named in Test squad to face New Zealand, there was no place in the squad for White.

=== One-day specialist ===
Although not included in the Test squads to face either New Zealand or South Africa, White was named in the ODI and Twenty20 squads to face South Africa at home, and professed "it was a good feeling to know you are still in the mix". White played in a more familiar role in the Twenty20s, batting in the middle-order, and after a disappointing 7 in the first match, made 40* off 18 in the second to push Australia's total up beyond South Africa's reach. He had a steady ODI series, in which he was again used as a middle-order batsman, and part-time spinner. He retained his place for the one-day series against New Zealand, but had limited involvement, making 27 runs from his two innings, though he did claim two wickets in his seven overs bowling.

His lack of involvement with the Test squad allowed him to return to Victoria to lead them in a losing cause in the Ford Ranger Cup final, a narrow 12 run loss to Queensland. Draws against Tasmania and Queensland, set up another Queensland–Victoria final, this time in the Sheffield Shield (formerly the Pura Cup). White was named as man of the match as he led his team to their first championship since 2003–04, scoring 135 and 61 as Queensland were out-played comprehensively.

White remained in Australia's Twenty20 team for their two matches in South Africa, but was not involved in their ODI matches, and subsequently was not named as part of their squad for the ICC World Twenty20. However, after Symonds was sent home from the tournament due to 'an alcohol-related incident', White was called up as his replacement. Australia were knocked out in the group-stage of the competition with White unused in their two matches, Cricinfo's Brydon Coverdale lambasting Australia's belief that "the players who carry them in Test and 50-over cricket can do the same in three-hour games". White returned to Australia to captain the A team against Pakistan and showed consistency with the bat, culminating in 73* in the Twenty20 match.

=== Knowing his role ===
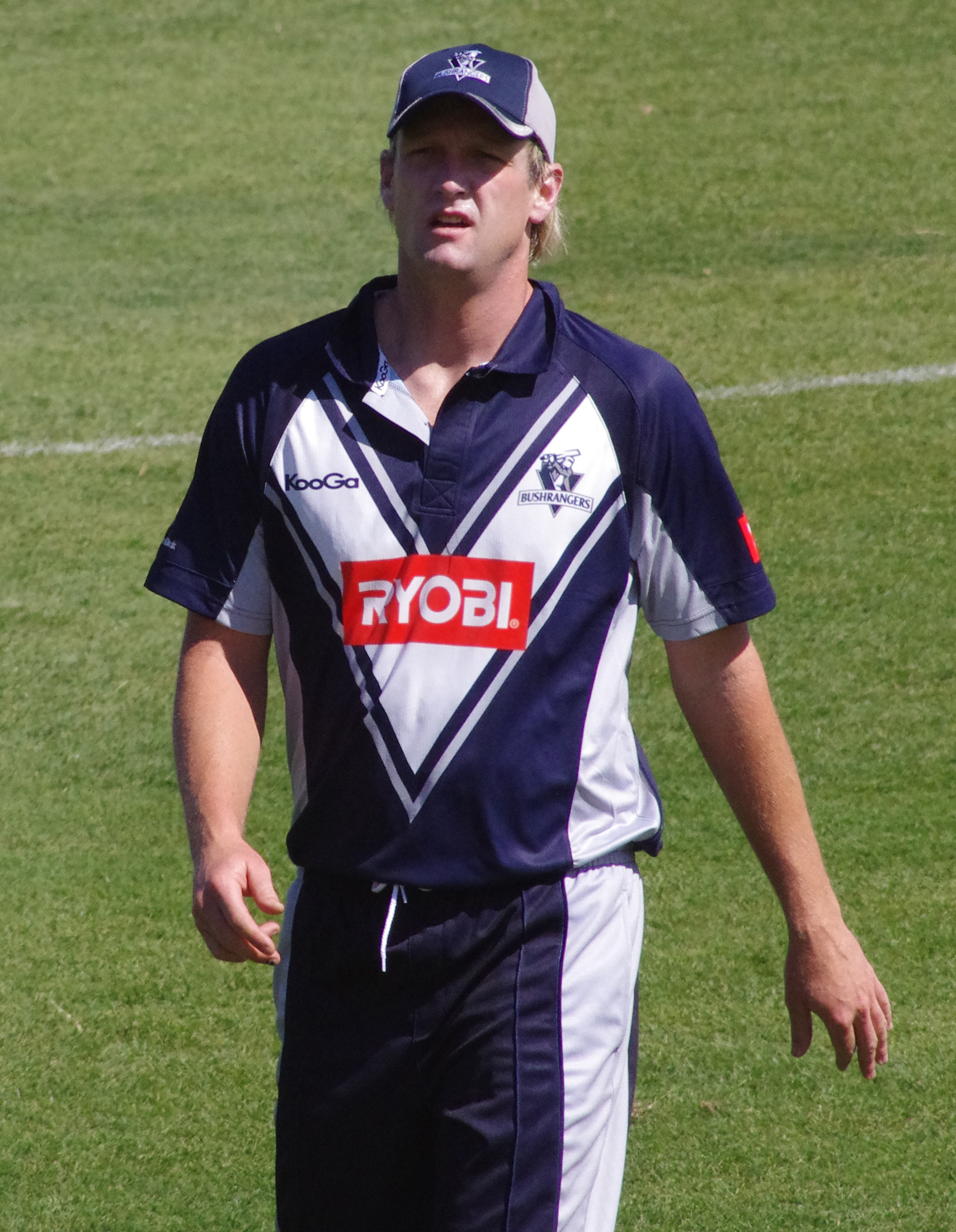
Cameron White in 2008.

Named in both one-day squads for the tour of England, and in the Champions Trophy squad, White's role in the team was now that of a batsman. In the rain-abandoned Twenty20 in England, he made his best Twenty20 International score of 55, and was the only player to cope with the poor conditions on a two-paced pitch. In the ODI series, White saw himself promoted to number three in the absence of Ponting, and responded with scores of 53 and 42 in the first two matches, before making his maiden international century in the third. His 124-ball 105 saw him named man of the match in his last match before Ponting's return which would see him drop back down the batting order. He played the remaining four matches of the series at number six, but finished the tour as Australia's leading run-scorer in ODIs.

White was ever-present in Australia's triumph in the 2009 Champions Trophy, saving his best performance for the final where, having been promoted to number four, he scored a patient 62 against New Zealand to help Australia recover from 6/2 to ease to a six wicket victory. The following ODI series against India saw White remain at number four due to injuries to Michael Clarke and Brad Haddin, and he made three half-centuries including a remarkable 57 off 33 balls including 5 sixes. After being in and out of the Australian set-up earlier in his career, White claimed "I think my best position is up around where I have been batting", a statement backed up by an average of 41.71 in his 18 appearances since his call-up to face England earlier that year. The higher responsibility placed on White as a batsman was balanced by a much lower responsibility with the ball; across the whole of the 2009 season, he only bowled three balls in One Day International cricket.

Upon the retirement of Ricky Ponting from international Twenty20 cricket, there were some calls for White to be promoted to captain the side, led by his Victoria coach Greg Shipperd. Despite these calls, White backed the favourite, incumbent vice-captain Michael Clarke for the role. White was eventually named as Clarke's vice-captain, although worries about Clarke's injury-prone back and his struggles with form in Twenty20 resulted in continued calls for White to take over, though White again backed Clarke, claiming "Michael's going to do a great job and I'll just look forward to working with him. I'm still really young in the [Australia] job as well and very inexperienced at this level, so I think I can learn a lot off him."

The return of Clarke to the ODI team for the Pakistan series also saw White move down the order again, although batting at number five, he made his second international century in the first match, scoring 105 from 88 balls to help drive Australia to victory. White continued to perform well with the bat in the series, making a half-century in the second match and making decent totals in a number of the other games as Australia swept the series 5–0.

== Indian Premier League ==
In the 2011 Indian Premier League season, White was bought by Deccan Chargers for US$1.1 million, becoming the second highest paid Australian in the IPL, behind David Hussey. He was named vice-captain. During the following season, White captained the side for the first match with regular captain Kumar Sangakkara on international duty. He scored his first IPL fifty against Pune Warriors India, before scoring another four half-centuries, ending the season as the team's second highest run scorer with 479 runs with an batting average of 43.54, a strike rate of 149.68, and a highest score of 78 runs. He also captained the Chargers in a further 2 matches.

The Deccan was terminated in October 2012, but White was retained by the replacement franchise, Sunrisers Hyderabad, captaining the team when Sangakkara was not selected. He scored 209 runs, averaging 17.41 with a strike rate of 109.42.

== International recall ==
White signed for Northamptonshire Steelbacks to play in the Friends Life T20 competition, as their second overseas player. White scored the most runs for the Steelbacks; 228 runs with an average of 57 and a strike rate of 131.03, with a high score of 62* from 8 innings. White re-signed to play for the Melbourne Stars in the Big Bash League, signing a 3-year contract. It was also announced White would step down as captain of the Melbourne Stars, with Shane Warne succeeding him.

In the same week, White was rewarded for his Twenty20 form, earning a recall to the Australian Twenty20 team to play Pakistan in the UAE. This led of the Australian selectors naming White in the 15-man squad for the 2012 ICC World Twenty20, held in Sri Lanka.

After nearly a 3-year absence, he was named in the ODI squad to replace the injured Chris Lynn and ahead of Glenn Maxwell.

== Retirement ==
In August 2020, White announced his retirement from professional cricket. He said he intended to continue playing Premier Cricket for the Melbourne Cricket Club and was also looking for coaching opportunities. In January 2026, White was named the head coach of the San Francisco Unicorns.

== Captain of Australia ==
Cameron White's record as captain
	Matches	Won	Lost	Drawn	Tied	No result	Win %
ODI	1	1	0	0	0	–	100%
Twenty20	6	2	4	0	0	–	33.33%
Date last Updated:		2 September 2015					

When Michael Clarke retired from Twenty20 International, White was named captain for the 2-match Twenty20 International series against England after the 2010–11 Ashes Series.

White was then named vice-captain to Clarke for the following 7-match One Day Series against England. When Clarke was rested for the last ODI, White was named captain of the side. He is the first Victorian since Shane Warne to captain the Australia ODI Team.

On the same day Michael Clarke was announced as captain, of the Test & ODI teams, Cameron White was announced as the permanent Twenty20 Captain, with Shane Watson vice-captain in all formats. However, he was dropped as captain of the Australian Twenty20 team, following poor form in the Big Bash League. He was succeeded by Melbourne Stars teammate George Bailey.

== Coaching career ==
After his retirement from playing, White took up coaching, transitioning from a playing role to an assistant coaching role at the Adelaide Strikers, before a stint as an assistant at the Sydney Sixers. Ahead of the 2024–25 season, White was appointed the senior coach of his former Big Bash League club, the Melbourne Renegades, on a three-year deal. However, after his second season with the Renegades, amid much uncertainty with Cricket Victoria looking to sell the Renegades to a private investor and focus on owning and operating the Melbourne Stars only, Cricket Victoria re-deployed White at the Stars for the 2026–27 season.

== Notes ==
Preceded by Michael Clarke	Australian Twenty20 International cricket captain 2011	Succeeded by George Bailey
