= Australia national cricket team record by opponent =

The Australia national cricket team represents Australia in international cricket and is a full member of the International Cricket Council (ICC) with Test and One Day International (ODI) status. Australia is the joint oldest team in Test cricket history, having played in the first ever Test match in 1876

. The team also plays One Day International cricket and Twenty20 International, participating in both the first ODI, against England in the 1970–71 season and the first Twenty20 International, against New Zealand in the 2004–05 season, winning both games.

Australia is the most successful Test team in cricketing history with an overall winning rate of 47.39%. As of 11 July 2022, Australia have played 844 Test matches; winning 400, lost 227, 215 were drawn and 2 matches were tied.

Australia is also the most successful ODI team in the history as well, where they have achieved an unbreakable record in ODI history. As of 22 November 2022, Australia have played 975 ODI matches, winning 592 matches and losing 340; they also tied 9 matches, whilst 34 had no result. They have won the Cricket World Cup a record 6 times, more than any other nation, in 1987, 1999, 2003, 2007, 2015 and 2023 and were also runners-up in 1975 and 1996.

Though Australia is brilliant in Test and ODI arena, they have performed more indifferently in Twenty20 Internationals. As of 4 November 2022, Australia have played 174 T20I matches and won 91 of them. 76 were lost, 3 tied and 4 had no result. The winning percentage is only 54.41. During 8 ICC World Twenty20 tournaments, Australia's best performance came during 2021, where they beat New Zealand to lift their first T20I World Cup.

As of July 2022, Australia have faced nine of the eleven other teams in Test cricket, with their most frequent opponent being The Ashes rivals, England; playing 356 matches against them. Due to more matches against England, they have registered more wins against England, but the best winning percentage of 100 against Zimbabwe, having won all three Tests. In ODI matches, Australia have played against 18 teams; they have played against England most frequently, with a winning percentage of 57.61 in 154 matches. Against the other nations with Test status, Australia has the best record against Ireland and Afghanistan having never lost in an ODI match against them. They have also never lost an ODI match against a non-Test playing nation. The team have competed against 12 countries in T20Is, and have played 22 matches against South Africa. Out of that, Australia have defeated South Africa on 14 occasions.

== Key ==
Key for the tables
Symbol	Meaning
Matches	Number of matches played
Won	Number of matches won
Lost	Number of matches lost
Tied	Number of matches tied
Draw	Number of matches ended in a draw
No Result	Number of matches ended with no result
Tie+Win	Number of matches tied and then won in a tiebreaker such as a bowl-out or Super Over
Tie+Loss	Number of matches tied and then lost in a tiebreaker such as a bowl-out or Super Over
%Won	Percentage of games won to those played.
W/L Ratio	Ratio of matches won to matches lost
First	Year of the first match played by Australia against the country
Last	Year of the last match played by Australia against the country

== Test cricket ==
Team	Opponent	1st Test	Matches	Won	Lost	Drawn	Tied	% Won
Australia	England	15 March 1877	361	152	112	97	0	42.10
Australia	South Africa	11 October 1902	101	54	26	21	0	53.46
Australia	West Indies	12 December 1930	120	61	33	25	1	50.83
Australia	New Zealand	29 March 1946	62	36	8	18	0	58.06
Australia	India	28 November 1947	112	48	33	30	1	42.85
Australia	Pakistan	11 October 1956	72	37	15	20	0	51.38
Australia	Sri Lanka	22 April 1983	35	22	5	8	0	62.85
Australia	Zimbabwe	14 October 1999	3	3	0	0	0	100
Australia	Bangladesh	18 July 2003	6	5	1	0	0	83.33
Australia	ICC World XI	14 October 2005	1	1	0	0	0	100
Australia		Total	866	414	232	218	2	47.99
Australia	Source: ESPNCricinfo. Last updated: April 2024							

== One Day International ==
=== Matches played (by country) ===
Team	Opponent	Matches	Won	Lost	Tied	NR	% Won
Australia	England	162	92	65	2	3	58.49
Australia	New Zealand	142	96	39	0	7	71.11
Australia	Pakistan	111	71	36	1	3	66.20
Australia	Sri Lanka	105	64	37	0	4	63.36
Australia	West Indies	146	79	61	3	3	56.29
Australia	Canada	2	2	0	0	0	100.00
Australia	India	155	86	59	0	10	59.31
Australia	Zimbabwe	33	29	3	0	1	90.62
Australia	Bangladesh	22	20	1	0	1	95.23
Australia	South Africa	113	52	57	3	1	47.76
Australia	Kenya	5	5	0	0	0	100.00
Australia	Scotland	5	5	0	0	0	100.00
Australia	Netherlands	3	3	0	0	0	100.00
Australia	Namibia	1	1	0	0	0	100.00
Australia	United States	1	1	0	0	0	100.00
Australia	ICC World XI	3	3	0	0	0	100.00
Australia	Ireland	5	4	0	0	1	100.00
Australia	Afghanistan	5	4	0	0	1	100.00
Source: Cricinfo. Last updated: 2 January 2026.

== Twenty20 International ==
=== Matches played (by country) ===
Team	Opponent	Matches	Won	Lost	Tied	No result	% Won
Australia
Australia	New Zealand	22	15	5	1	1	73.80
Australia	England	26	12	12	0	2	50.00
Australia	South Africa	28	19	9	0	0	67.85
Australia	Zimbabwe	3	2	1	0	0	66.66
Australia	Bangladesh	11	7	4	0	0	63.63
Australia	Pakistan	28	14	12	1	1	53.70
Australia	Sri Lanka	26	15	10	1	0	59.61
Australia	India	37	12	22	0	3	35.29
Australia	West Indies	27	16	11	0	0	59.25
Australia	Ireland	2	2	0	0	0	100.00
Australia	United Arab Emirates	1	1	0	0	0	100.00
Australia	Afghanistan	2	1	1	0	0	50.00
Australia	Oman	1	1	0	0	0	100.00
Australia	Namibia	1	1	0	0	0	100.00
Australia	Scotland	1	1	0	0	0	100.00
Last updated: 2 January 2026.
