= History of Australian cricket from 2000–01 =

This article describes the history of Australian cricket from the 2000–01 season.

Australia has dominated world cricket in the first 25 years of the 21st century. Great players during this period have been Shane Warne, Glenn McGrath and Adam Gilchrist.

== Domestic cricket ==
Queensland has been the strongest team during this period but there was a pleasant surprise for the cricket world when Tasmania, which staged the inaugural first-class Australian match in 1851, finally won the domestic championship for the first time in 2007.

=== Pura Cup winners ===
- 2000-01 – Queensland
- 2001-02 – Queensland
- 2002-03 – New South Wales
- 2003-04 – Victoria
- 2004-05 – New South Wales
- 2005-06 – Queensland
- 2006-07 – Tasmania

== International tours of Australia ==
=== West Indies 2000-01 ===
For more information about this tour, see : West Indian cricket team in Australia in 2000-01

=== Zimbabwe 2000-01 ===
For more information about this tour, see : Zimbabwean cricket team in Australia in 2000-01

=== New Zealand 2001-02 ===
For more information about this tour, see : New Zealand cricket team in Australia in 2001-02

=== South Africa 2001-02 ===
For more information about this tour, see : South African cricket team in Australia in 2001-02

=== Pakistan 2002 ===
For more information about this tour, see : Pakistani cricket team in Australia in 2002

=== England 2002-03 ===
For more information about this tour, see : English cricket team in Australia in 2002-03

=== Sri Lanka 2002-03 ===
For more information about this tour, see : Sri Lankan cricket team in Australia in 2002-03

=== Bangladesh 2003 ===
For more information about this tour, see : Bangladeshi cricket team in Australia in 2003

=== India 2003-04 ===
For more information about this tour, see : Indian cricket team in Australia in 2003-04

=== Zimbabwe 2003-04 ===
For more information about this tour, see : Zimbabwean cricket team in Australia in 2003-04

=== Sri Lanka 2004 ===
For more information about this tour, see : Sri Lankan cricket team in Australia in 2004

=== New Zealand 2004-05 ===
For more information about this tour, see : New Zealand cricket team in Australia in 2004-05

=== Pakistan 2004-05 ===
For more information about this tour, see : Pakistani cricket team in Australia in 2004-05

=== West Indies 2004-05 ===
For more information about this tour, see : West Indian cricket team in Australia in 2004-05

=== South Africa 2005-06 ===
For more information about this tour, see : South African cricket team in Australia in 2005-06

=== Sri Lanka 2005-06 ===
For more information about this tour, see : Sri Lankan cricket team in Australia in 2005-06

=== West Indies 2005-06 ===
For more information about this tour, see : West Indian cricket team in Australia in 2005-06

=== England 2006-07 ===
For more information about this tour, see : English cricket team in Australia in 2006-07

== External sources ==
- CricketArchive – itinerary of Australian cricket
