= List of World XI ODI cricketers =

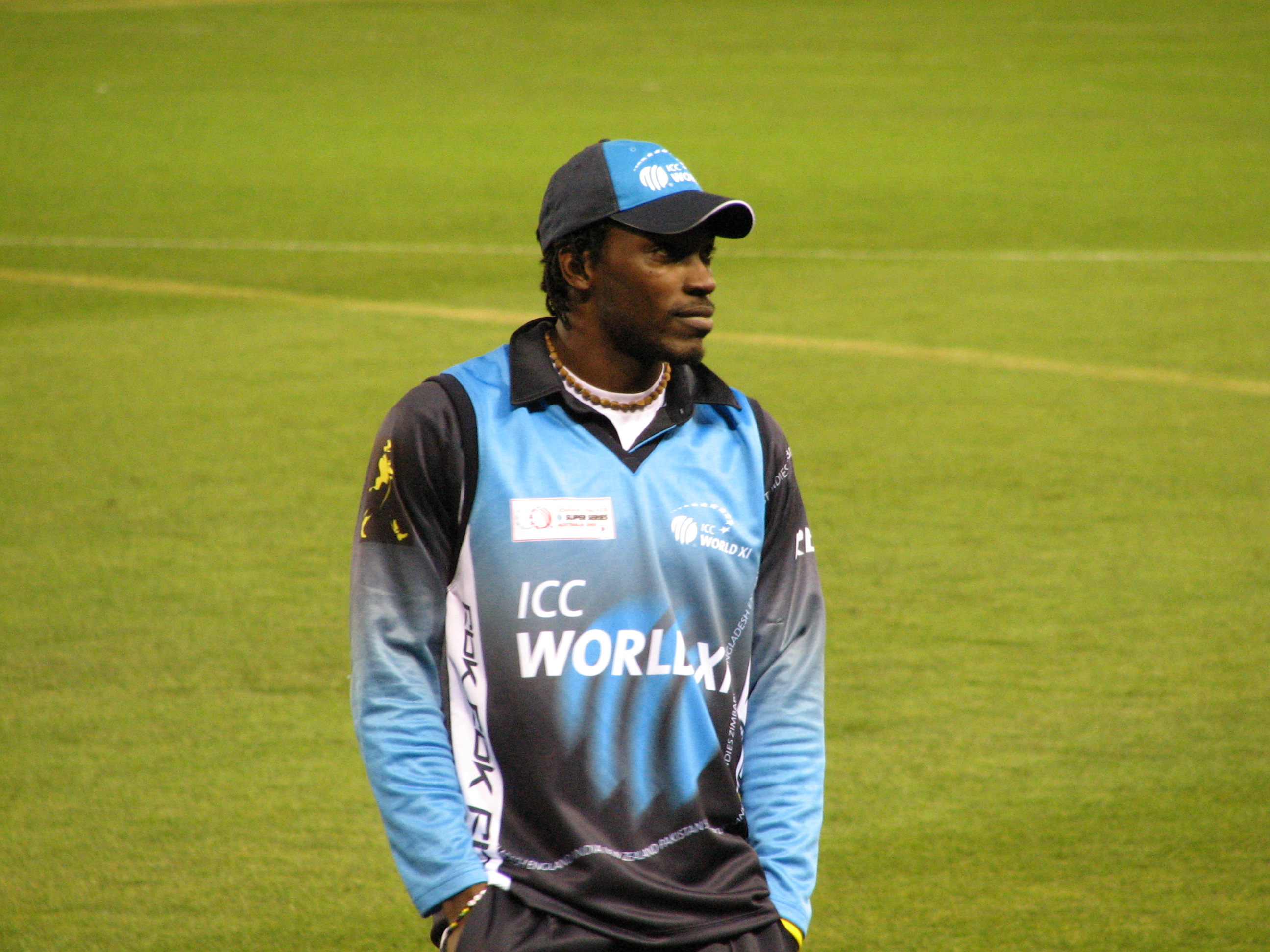
West Indian Chris Gayle playing in his World XI uniform during an ICC Super Series One Day International

The ICC World ODI XI was a team chosen by the International Cricket Council (ICC), representing the most talented One Day International cricketers playing international cricket at the time. A One Day International (ODI) is an international cricket match between two representative teams, each having ODI status, as determined by the ICC. An ODI differs from a Test match in that the number of overs per team is limited, and that each team has only one innings. The ICC World XI has played four matches, one for the 2005 World Cricket Tsunami Appeal (where the World XI was made up of the best non-Asian players), and three in the 2005 ICC Super Series (where the World XI was made up of the best non-Australian players). The list is arranged in the order in which each player won his first ODI cap. In cases in which more than one player won his first ODI cap in the same match, these players are listed alphabetically by surname. All these players have represented their respective national teams too, but only the records of their games for the ICC World XI are given.

The ODI between the World XI and Asian XI ended in a World XI victory by 112 runs. Ricky Ponting, captaining the side, scored 115 as the World XI batted first and scored 344/8, with Chris Cairns and Brian Lara both scoring half centuries. The Asian XI was unable to reach 345 for victory but did make 232 from their innings. For every run scored in the match, $1,000 was donated to the tsunami appeal. Over 70,000 people attended the match which was televised in 122 countries. The endeavour raised over A$14 million. A second fund-raising match between the two teams was cancelled due to unsuitable playing conditions.

== Players ==
Statistics are correct as of 30 October 2005, since then no matches have been played by the World XI.

Key

General
† Denotes a player still active in international cricket as of 21 January 2017
*: an innings that ended not out
Mat: number of matches played
Batting
Inn: number of innings
NO: number of times an innings ends not out
Runs: number of runs scored by batsman/off bowler's bowling
HS: highest score
Avg: batting average

Bowling
Balls: number of balls bowled
Wkt: number of wickets taken
BB: best bowling figures
Avg: bowling average
Fielding
Ca: number of catches taken
St: number of stumpings made

Cap	Name	Team	Career	Mat	Inn	NO	Runs	HS	Avg	Balls	Runs	Wkt	BB	Avg	Ca	St
1	Chris Cairns	New Zealand	2005	1	1	0	69	69	69.00	36	37	1	1/37	37.00	0	0
2	Stephen Fleming	New Zealand	2005	1	1	0	30	30	30.00	0	–	–	–	–	1	0
3	Chris Gayle	West Indies	2005	3	3	0	55	54	18.33	47	58	0	–	–	1	0
4	Adam Gilchrist (wk)	Australia	2005	1	1	0	24	24	24.00	0	–	–	–	–	1	1
5	Darren Gough	England	2005	1	0	–	–	–	–	48	55	1	1/55	55.00	1	0
6	Matthew Hayden	Australia	2005	1	1	0	2	2	2.00	0	–	–	–	–	0	0
7	Brian Lara	West Indies	2005	4	4	0	57	52	14.25	0	–	–	–	–	3	0
8	Glenn McGrath	Australia	2005	1	1	0	0	0	0.00	42	37	1	1/37	37.00	0	0
9	Ricky Ponting	Australia	2005	1	1	0	115	115	115.00	0	–	–	–	–	1	0
10	Daniel Vettori	New Zealand	2005	4	4	2	53	27*	26.50	240	179	8	4/33	22.37	2	0
11	Shane Warne	Australia	2005	1	1	1	2	2*	–	42	27	2	2/27	13.50	0	0
12	Shahid Afridi	Pakistan	2005	2	2	0	18	16	9.00	0	–	–	–	–	0	0
13	Shoaib Akhtar	Pakistan	2005	2	2	1	12	10*	12.00	102	110	0	–	–	0	0
14	Rahul Dravid	India	2005	3	3	0	46	36	15.33	0	–	–	–	–	0	0
15	Andrew Flintoff	England	2005	3	3	0	101	42	33.66	128	153	1	1/64	153.00	1	0
16	Jacques Kallis	South Africa	2005	3	3	0	21	11	7.00	52	70	1	1/26	70.00	0	0
17	Muttiah Muralitharan	Sri Lanka	2005	3	0	–	–	–	–	180	122	5	2/38	24.40	1	0
18	Kevin Pietersen	England	2005	2	2	0	18	16	9.00	0	–	–	–	–	1	0
19	Shaun Pollock	South Africa	2005	3	3	0	28	15	9.33	150	148	2	1/32	74.00	1	0
20	Kumar Sangakkara (wk)	Sri Lanka	2005	3	3	0	138	64	46.00	0	–	–	–	–	1	0
21	Virender Sehwag	India	2005	3	3	0	64	37	21.33	30	33	1	1/20	33.00	0	0
22	Makhaya Ntini	South Africa	2005	1	1	1	0	0*	–	42	58	1	1/58	58.00	0	0

== See also ==
- One Day International
- List of World XI Test cricketers
- List of World XI T20I cricketers
