= Adam Gilchrist =

Australian cricketer (born 1971)

Adam Gilchrist AM
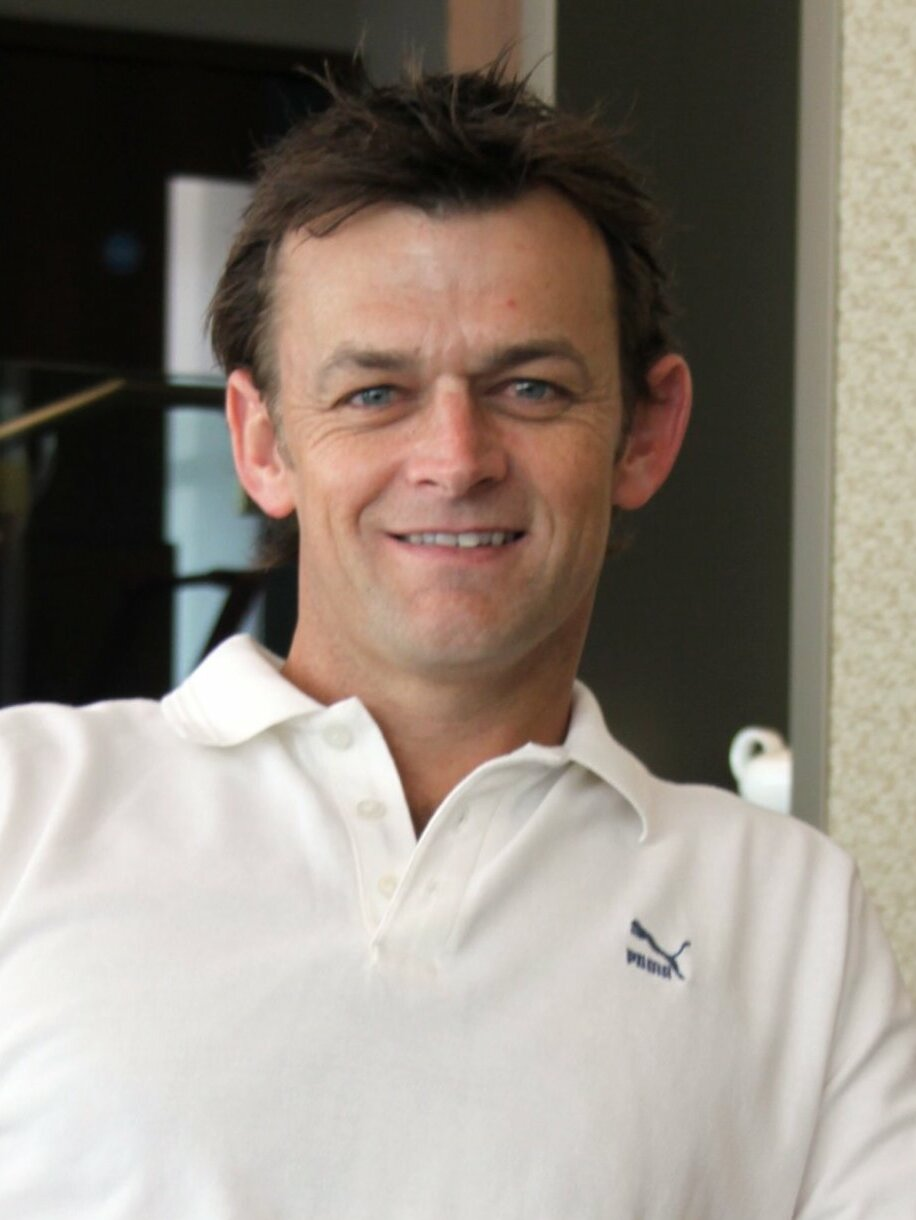
- Gilchrist in 2010

Personal information
- Full name: Adam Craig Gilchrist
- Born: 14 November 1971 (age 55); Bellingen, New South Wales, Australia
- Nickname: Gilly, Churchy
- Height: 186 cm (6 ft 1 in)
- Batting: Left-handed
- Role: Wicket-keeper-batsman

International information
- National side: Australia (1996–2008)
- Test debut (cap 381): 5 November 1999 v Pakistan
- Last Test: 24 January 2008 v India
- ODI debut (cap 129): 25 October 1996 v South Africa
- Last ODI: 4 March 2008 v India
- ODI shirt no.: 12, 18
- T20I debut (cap 2): 17 February 2005 v New Zealand
- Last T20I: 1 February 2008 v India

Domestic team information
- Years: Team
- 1992/93–1993/94: New South Wales
- 1994/95–2007/08: Western Australia
- 2008–2010: Deccan Chargers
- 2010: Middlesex
- 2011–2013: Kings XI Punjab

Career statistics
Competition	Test	ODI	FC	LA
Matches	96	287	190	356
Runs scored	5,570	9,619	10,334	11,326
Batting average	47.60	35.89	44.16	34.95
100s/50s	17/26	16/55	30/43	18/63
Top score	204*	172	204*	172
Catches/stumpings	379/37	417/55	756/55	526/65
Medal record
Men's Cricket
Representing Australia
ICC Cricket World Cup
Winner	1999 England-Wales -Ireland-Scotland-Netherlands
Winner	2003 South Africa-Zimbabwe-Namibia
Winner	2007 West Indies
Commonwealth Games
Silver medal – second place	1998 Kuala Lumpur
- Source: ESPNcricinfo, 4 December 2013

Adam Craig Gilchrist AM (/ɡɪlkrɪst/; born 14 November 1971) is an Australian cricket commentator and former international cricketer and captain of the Australia national cricket team. He was an attacking left-handed batsman and record-breaking wicket-keeper, who redefined the role for the Australia national team through his aggressive batting. Widely regarded as the greatest wicket-keeper-batsman in the history of the game, Gilchrist held the world record for the most dismissals by a wicket-keeper in One Day International (ODI) cricket until it was surpassed by Kumar Sangakkara in 2015 and the most by an Australian in Test cricket. Gilchrist was a member of the Australian team that won three consecutive world titles in a row: the 1999 Cricket World Cup, the 2003 Cricket World Cup, and the 2007 Cricket World Cup, along with winning the 2006 ICC Champions Trophy.

His strike rate is amongst the highest in the history of both ODI and Test cricket; his 57 ball century against England at Perth in December 2006 is the fourth-fastest century in all Test cricket. He was the first player to have hit 100 sixes in Test cricket. His 17 Test centuries and 16 in ODIs are both second only to Sangakkara by a wicket-keeper. He holds the unique record of scoring at least 50 runs in three consecutive World Cup finals (in 1999, 2003 and 2007). His 149 off 101 balls against Sri Lanka in the 2007 World Cup final is rated one of the greatest World Cup innings of all time. He is one of only three players to have won three World Cup titles.

Gilchrist was renowned for walking when he considered himself to be out, sometimes contrary to the decision of the umpire. He made his first-class debut in 1992, his first One-Day International appearance in 1996 in India and his Test debut in 1999. During his career, he played for Australia in 96 Test matches and over 270 One-day internationals. He was Australia's regular vice-captain in both forms of the game, captaining the team when regular captains Steve Waugh and Ricky Ponting were unavailable. He retired from international cricket in March 2008, though he continued to play domestic tournaments until 2013.

== Early and personal life ==
Adam Gilchrist was born in 1971 at Bellingen Hospital, in Bellingen, New South Wales, the youngest of four children. He and his family lived in Dorrigo, Junee and then Deniliquin where, playing for his school, Deniliquin South Public School, he won the Brian Taber Shield (named after New South Wales cricketer Brian Taber). When Adam was 13, his parents, Stan and June, moved the family to Lismore where he captained the Kadina High School cricket team.

Gilchrist was selected for the state under-17 team, and in 1989 he was offered a scholarship by London-based Richmond Cricket Club, a scheme he now supports himself. During his year at Richmond, he also played junior cricket for Old Actonians Cricket Club's under-17 team, with whom he won the Middlesex League and Cup double. He moved to Sydney and joined the Gordon District Cricket Club in Sydney Grade Cricket, later moving to Northern Districts.

Gilchrist is married to his high school sweetheart Melinda (née Sharpe), a dietitian, and they have three sons and a daughter. His family came under the spotlight in the months leading up to the 2007 Cricket World Cup as one impending birth threatened his presence in the squad; the child was born in February and Gilchrist was able to take part in the tournament.

== Domestic career ==
In 1991, Gilchrist was selected for the Australia Young Cricketers, a national youth team that toured England and played in youth ODIs and Tests. Gilchrist scored a century and a fifty in the three Tests. Upon his return to Australia late in the year, Gilchrist was accepted into the Australian Cricket Academy. Over the next year, Gilchrist represented the ACA as they played matches against the Second XI of Australia's state teams, and toured South Africa to play provincial youth teams.

Upon returning to Australia, Gilchrist scored two centuries in four matches for the state Colts and Second XI teams, and was rewarded with selection to make his first-class debut for New South Wales during the 1992–93 season, although he played purely as a batsman, due to the presence of incumbent wicketkeeper Phil Emery.

In his first season, the team won the Sheffield Shield, Gilchrist scoring an unbeaten 20 in the second innings to secure an easy win over Queensland in the final. Gilchrist made 274 runs at an average of 30.44 in his debut season, a score of 75 being his only effort beyond fifty. He also made his debut in Mercantile Mutual limited overs competition. He struggled to keep his place in the team, playing only three first-class matches in the following season. He scored on 43 runs at 8.60; New South Wales won both competitions, but Gilchrist was overlooked for both finals and did not play a single limited overs match.

Due to a lack of opportunities in the dominant New South Wales outfit, Gilchrist joined Western Australia at the start of the 1994–95, where he had to compete with former Test player Tim Zoehrer for the wicket-keeper's berth. Gilchrist had no guarantee of selection. However, he made a century in a pre-season trial match and seized Zoehrer's place. The local fans were initially hostile to the move, but Gilchrist won them over. He made 55 first-class dismissals in his first season, the most by any wicketkeeper in Australian domestic cricket in 1994–95. However, he struggled with the bat, scoring 398 runs at 26.53 with seven single figure scores, although he recorded his maiden first-class century in the latter stages of the season, with 126 against South Australia. Gilchrist was rewarded with selection in the Young Australia team that toured England in 1995 and played matches against the English counties. Gilchrist starred with bat, scoring 490 runs at 70.00 with two centuries.

His second season based in Perth saw him top of the dismissals again, with 58 catches and four stumpings, but, significantly, 835 runs at an impressive batting average of 50.52.

The Warriors made it to the final of the Sheffield Shield, at the Adelaide Oval, where Gilchrist scored 189 not out in the first innings, from only 187 balls, including five sixes. The innings brought Gilchrist national prominence. The match ended in a thrilling draw as South Australia's last-wicket pair held on to fend off the visitors. The hosts thus took the title, having scored more points in the qualifying matches. Gilchrist also scored an unbeaten 76 to help Western Australia secure a narrow three-wicket victory over New South Wales in the penultimate limited overs match of the season, which saw them into the final against Queensland, which was lost.

Gilchrist's form saw him selected for Australia A, a team comprising players close to national selection. At the start of the 1996–97 season, sections of the media advocated that he replace Ian Healy as the national wicket-keeper, but Healy struck 161 in the First Test and maintained his position. Gilchrist continued to perform strongly on the domestic circuit he topped the dismissals count once again, with 62, along with a batting average of just under 40, although he failed to post a century.

Team success came in the Mercantile Mutual Cup, where the Warriors won by eight wickets against Queensland in the March 1997 final; Gilchrist was not required to bat.

The 1997–98 season ended with Gilchrist top of the dismissals chart for the fourth season in a row with an improved batting average of 47.66, despite playing in only six of the ten qualifying Shield matches due to his becoming a regular member of the national limited overs team. Gilchrist registered his maiden–first-class double century with an unbeaten 203 against South Australia early in the season, before returning late in the season after his international commitments were over. He added 109 against Victoria, and played in the Sheffield Shield final victory over Tasmania, although he scored only eight. There was disappointment for the team in the Mercantile Mutual Cup, losing the semi-final to Queensland.

The following season saw Gilchrist's domestic appearances diminish due to his international commitments: he made only a single appearance in the Mercantile Mutual Cup, but still managed to help Western Australia defend the Sheffield Shield, scoring a century in the qualifying rounds.

Gilchrist's regular selection for Australia meant that he was rarely available for domestic selection after he became the Test wicket-keeper in late-1999; between 1999 and 2005, he made only seven first-class appearances for his state.

He did not play in the 2005–06 Pura Cup and only appeared three times in the limited-overs ING Cup.

=== Indian Premier League ===
Gilchrist played a total of six seasons in the Indian Premier League (IPL), the major Twenty20 franchise league in India, three for Deccan Chargers and three for Kings XI Punjab. He was signed by Deccan for the 2008 season, the inaugural season of the competition, having been purchased for US$700,000 in the player auction a few months after his retirement from international cricket.

Before the fourth season of the IPL Gilchrist was bought at the 2011 player auction by Kings XI Punjab for US$900,000 and was, again, appointed as captain, taking over from Kumar Sangakkara who had moved to Deccan. In March 2012 he was named player-coach of the team for the following season, replacing his friend and former Australia teammate Michael Bevan, whose contract as head coach was not renewed. After the team failed to make the play-offs, Gilchrist speculated that he may choose to retire from cricket.

Following the appointment of Darren Lehmann, who had previously worked with Gilchrist at Deccan, as head coach, Gilchrist chose to play one more IPL season for Kings XI, once again as captain. In May 2013, Gilchrist announced his retirement from the IPL. A planned appearance in the first season of the Caribbean Premier League had to be cancelled after an ankle injury and the match proved to be Gilchrist's last in top-class cricket. In that fixture, Gilchrist took the wicket of Harbhajan Singh, from his one and only ball he ever bowled in a T20 match.

Over his six seasons in the IPL Gilchrist played a total of 82 matches, 48 for Deccan and 34 for Kings XI. He scored more than 2,000 runs, including two centuries. He was also the first cricketer to score 1000 runs in IPL.

=== Middlesex ===
Gilchrist signed a short-term contract in November 2009 to play Twenty20 cricket for Middlesex County Cricket Club in England during 2010. He was appointed interim captain of the T20 team on 11 June following the sudden resignation of Shaun Udal. He played in seven matches for the team during the 2010 Twenty20 Cup, scoring 212 runs at an average of 30.28, including a century made against Kent at Canterbury, as well as captaining the county against the touring Australians in a one-day match ahead of their ODI series against England. The season was Gilchrist's only one spent playing county cricket.

== International career ==
Adam Gilchrist's record as captain
	Matches	Won	Lost	Drawn	Tied	No result	Win %
Test	6	4	1	1	0	–	66.67%
ODI	17	12	4	0	0	1	70.59%
Twenty20	2	1	1	0	0	–	50%
Date last Updated:		2 September 2015					

=== Early one-day seasons ===
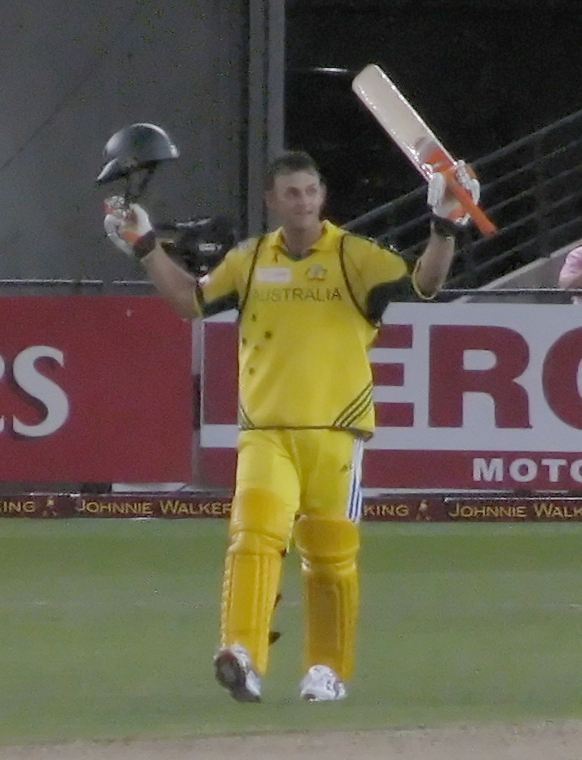
Celebrating a century against the World XI in the second ICC Super Series match at Telstra Dome (7 October 2005).

Gilchrist was called up for the Australian One Day International (ODI) team in 1996, his debut coming against South Africa at Faridabad on 25 October 1996 as the 129th Australian ODI cap, after an injury to incumbent Ian Healy. While not particularly impressive with the bat on his debut, scoring 18 before being bowled by Allan Donald, Gilchrist took his first catch as an international wicketkeeper, Hansie Cronje departing for a golden duck from the bowling of Paul Reiffel. He was run out for a duck in his only other ODI on the tour. Healy resumed his place during the 1996–97 season. Gilchrist replaced Healy for the first two ODIs in the 1997 Australian tour of South Africa, after Healy was suspended for dissent. When Healy returned Gilchrist maintained his position in the team as a specialist batsman after Mark Waugh sustained a hand injury.

It was during this series that Gilchrist made his first ODI half-century, with an innings of 77 in Durban. He totalled 127 runs at 31.75 for the series. Gilchrist went on to play in the Texaco Trophy later in 1997 in the 3–0 series loss against England, scoring 53 and 33 in two innings.

At the start of the 1997–98 Australian season, Healy and captain Mark Taylor were omitted from the ODI squad as the Australian selectors opted for Gilchrist and Michael di Venuto. Gilchrist's elevation was made possible by a change in policy by selectors, who announced that selection for ODI and Test teams would be separate, with Test and ODI specialists selected accordingly, while Healy remained the preferred Test wicket-keeper. This came after Australia failed to qualify for the previous season's ODI triangular series final for the first time in 17 years. The new team was initially unconvincing, losing all four round robin matches against South Africa in the 1997–98 Carlton & United Series, with multiple players filling Taylor's role as Mark Waugh's opening partner without success. Gilchrist also struggled batting in the lower order at number seven, the conventional wicket-keeper's batting position, scoring 148 runs at 24.66 in the eight qualifying matches.

In the first final against South Africa at the Melbourne Cricket Ground Gilchrist was selected as Waugh's opening partner. In a particularly poor start to the new combination, Waugh was run out after a mix-up with Gilchrist. However, in the second final, Gilchrist struck his maiden ODI century, spearheading Australia's successful run chase at the Sydney Cricket Ground, securing his position as an opening batsman. Australia won the third final to claim the title.

Touring New Zealand in February 1998, Gilchrist topped the Australia averages with 200 runs at 50.00, including a match-winning 118 in the first match. He also effected his first ODI stumping, the wicket of Nathan Astle in the Second ODI in Wellington. Australia then played two triangular tournaments in Asia. Gilchrist struggled in India, scoring 86 runs at 17.20. He went on to play in the Coca-Cola Cup in Sharjah in April 1998, a triangular tournament between Australia, India and New Zealand. Australia finished runners-up in the tournament, with Gilchrist taking nine dismissals as wicketkeeper and averaging 37.13 with the bat.

Gilchrist won a silver medal at the 1998 Commonwealth Games in Kuala Lumpur, the only time men's cricket has been in the Commonwealth Games. The matches did not have ODI status, and after winning their first four fixtures, Australia lost the final to South Africa, Gilchrist making 15. He then scored 103 and ended with 190 runs at 63.33 as Australia took a rare 3–0 whitewash on Pakistani soil.

Gilchrist was in fine form ahead of the 1999 Cricket World Cup with a productive individual performance in the Carlton & United Series in January and February 1999 against Sri Lanka and England. He finished with 525 runs at a batting average of 43.75 with two centuries—both against Sri Lanka—and a fifty, and a total of 27 dismissals in 12 matches. His 131 helped Australia set a successful run-chase at the SCG, and he followed this with 154 at the MCG. The 1999 tour of the West Indies was Australia's last campaign before the World Cup and continued to prove Gilchrist's ability as a wicketkeeper-batsman. Gilchrist, with a batting average of 28.71 and a strike rate of nearly 90.00, and seven fielding dismissals in a seven-match series which ended 3–3 with one tie.

=== First World Cup success ===
Gilchrist played in every match of Australia's successful World Cup campaign, but struggled at first, with scores of 6, 14 and 0 in the first three matches against Scotland, New Zealand and Pakistan. Australia lost the latter two matches and had to avoid defeat for six consecutive matches to reach the final. Gilchrist's quick-fire 63 runs in 39 balls against Bangladesh helped the Australians into the Super Six stage of the tournament, which was secured with a win over the West Indies, although Gilchrist made only 21. Gilchrist continued to struggle in the Super Six phase, scoring 31, 10 and 5 against India, Zimbabwe and South Africa. Australia won all three matches, the last in the final over, to scrape into the semifinals. Gilchrist made only 20 in the semifinal against South Africa, but completed the final act of the match. With the scores tied, South Africa were going for the winning run when Gilchrist broke the stumps to complete the run out of Allan Donald; the match was tied, and Australia proceeded to the final as they had won the group stage match against South Africa. Gilchrist's 54 in the final helped secure Australia's first world title since 1987 with an eight wicket victory over Pakistan. It was a happy ending for Gilchrist, who had struggled through the tournament, with 237 runs at 21.54.

Success at the World Cup was followed by a defeat by Sri Lanka in the final of the Aiwa Cup in August 1999. Gilchrist was the most successful batsman and wicket-keeper of the tournament, with 231 runs at 46.20. While the Test players battled against Sri Lanka, Gilchrist led Australia A in a limited overs series against India A in Los Angeles. He then scored 60 runs at 20.00 as the Australians completed a 3–0 whitewash of Zimbabwe in October.

=== Test debut ===
Gilchrist made his Test match debut in the First Test against Pakistan at the Gabba in Brisbane in November 1999 becoming the 381st Australian Test cricketer. He replaced Healy, who was dropped after a run of poor form, despite the incumbent's entreaties to the selectors to allow him a farewell game in front of his home crowd. Gilchrist's entry into the Test arena coincided with a dramatic rise in Australia's fortunes. Up to this point, they had played eight Tests in 1999, winning and losing three.

Gilchrist's icy reception at the Gabba did not faze him; he took five catches, stumped Azhar Mahmood off Shane Warne's bowling and scored a rapid 81, mostly in partnership with ODI partner Waugh, in a match that Australia won comfortably by ten wickets. In his second Test match he made an unbeaten 149 to help guide Australia to victory in a game that looked well beyond their reach. Australia were struggling at 5/126 in pursuit of 369 for victory as he joined his Western Australian teammate, Justin Langer, but the pair put on a record-breaking partnership of 238 to seal an Australian win. Gilchrist continued his strong run throughout his debut Test season, and ended the summer with 485 runs at 69.28 in six matches, three each against Pakistan and India, adding two fifties against the latter.

Gilchrist was moderately successful in the following ODIs, the Carlton & United Series; Australia defeated Pakistan 2–0 in a best-of-three final. Gilchrist scored 272 runs at 27.20; his best effort was 92 in a 152-run victory over India on Australia Day. Gilchrist then scored 251 runs at 41.66 in the ODIs during a tour of New Zealand. The highlight was a 128 in Christchurch that propelled Australia to a score of 6/349. Gilchrist was named man of the match in two of the games.

In the Third Test against New Zealand in 2000, Gilchrist recorded the third best Test performance ever by a wicketkeeper, and the best by an Australian, taking ten catches in the match. Although Gilchrist's batting was modest, yielding 144 runs at 36.00, Australia took a 3–0 clean sweep. In two home and away ODI series against South Africa, Gilchrist had a quiet time, scoring 170 runs at 26.66. South Africa won three of the six matches, with one tie.

Later that year, he was handed the vice-captaincy of the Australian team in place of Shane Warne, who had been plagued by a number of off-field controversies, including an altercation with some teenage boys, and a sex scandal with a British nurse.

The 2000–01 season saw a West Indian touring party and Gilchrist warmed up with consecutive first-class centuries for Western Australia. Captaining his Test team for the first time in place of the injured Steve Waugh in the Third Test in Adelaide. Gilchrist scored only 9 and 10 not out, but a ten-wicket haul from Colin Miller resulted in a hard-fought five-wicket victory for Australia. Gilchrist described the match as "the proudest moment of my career". Waugh resumed the captaincy on his return to the team for the Fourth and Fifth Tests, with the series finishing in a 5–0 whitewash. Gilchrist scored 241 runs at 48.20 with two fifties. In the ensuing ODI tournament, Gilchrist scored 326 runs at 36.22 with a top-score of 98 as the Australians won all ten matches.

Up to this point, Gilchrist had played in 14 Tests, all in Australasia, and all of which had been won. Australia's run of 15 consecutive Test wins faced a steep challenge on the tour of India, where they had not won a Test series since 1969–70.

Australia's streak looked in danger during the First Test in Mumbai when they fell to 5/99 in reply to India's 171 when Gilchrist came to the crease. He counterattacked savagely, scoring 122 in just 112 balls, and featuring in a 197-run partnership with Matthew Hayden in only 32 overs. This swung the momentum back to Australia, who reached 349. Gilchrist took six catches and was named Man of the Match in a ten wicket victory, extending the world record run to 16.

Gilchrist's form dipped momentarily, with a rare king pair (two golden ducks in the same match) in the Second Test in Kolkata and just two runs in his two innings in Chennai. He was out LBW four consecutive times in the last two Tests, three of these to Harbhajan Singh, who took 32 wickets in the series to end Australia's run by inflicting a 2–1 series loss. His one-day form remained strong, with 172 runs at 43.00 in the ODI series in India, as Australia bounced back to win the series 3–2. During this series he captained the ODI team for the first time, winning all three of the matches under his captaincy.

=== 2001 Ashes ===
Gilchrist played a pivotal role in the 2001 Ashes series which Australia won 4–1, with 340 runs at a batting average of 68.00 and 26 dismissals in the five-match series.

Gilchrist warmed up by putting his ODI struggles on English soil in 1999 behind him, scoring 248 runs at 49.60 in the triangular tournament preceding the Tests, scoring an unbeaten 76 in the final win over Pakistan.

Gilchrist put the disappointment of India behind him in the First Test at Edgbaston, scoring 152 from only 143 balls. The allowed Australia to reach 576 in only 545 minutes, and set up an innings victory that set the tone for the series. Gilchrist then added 90 in the eight-wicket win in the Second Test at Lord's, before turning the tide in the Third Test at Trent Bridge. Australia slumped to 7/105 in reply to the hosts' 185, but Gilchrist's 54 took the tourists to 190 before a seven-wicket win resulted in the retention of the Ashes.

Gilchrist captained the team in the Fourth Test at Headingley after an injury to Steve Waugh. After persistent rain interruptions, Gilchrist declared with Australia four down at tea on the fourth day, leaving England with a target of 315, which, despite losing two early wickets, they reached with six wickets to spare, (Mark Butcher scoring an unbeaten 173, including 24 boundaries). Gilchrist failed to pass 25 in the last two Tests, but it had been a productive season; he scored centuries in both of Australia's county matches.

Two home series followed in the 2001–02 season, a fully drawn (0–0) three match series against New Zealand and a whitewash over South Africa 3–0. Gilchrist scored 118 in the First Test against New Zealand and an unbeaten 83 in the Third Test in Perth as the Australians held on for a draw with three wickets intact. However, Gilchrist did little in the triumph over South Africa, failing to pass 35. He ended the summer Tests with 353 runs at 50.42.

In the ensuing ODIs, Gilchrist scored only 97 runs at 16.16. The Australian selectors sought to accommodate Hayden, who had been successful as a Test opener, into the ODI team by rotating him with Gilchrist and Waugh, but this appeared to unsettle the team. With a newly fragile top order, Australia failed to qualify for the finals, and the Waugh brothers were dropped from the team, ending Gilchrist's four-year partnership with Mark. Ricky Ponting was promoted to the captaincy ahead of vice captain Gilchrist.

The Australians then toured South Africa the next month and it was during the First Test in Johannesburg that Gilchrist broke the record for the fastest double century in Tests on 23 February, requiring 212 balls for the feat. This was eight balls quicker than Ian Botham's innings against India at The Oval in 1982. He ended unbeaten on 204, having featured in a partnership of 317 with Damien Martyn at a run rate of 5.5. South Africa were demoralised and lost by an innings after being forced to follow on. The record lasted only one month, however, with New Zealand's Nathan Astle taking 59 balls less to reach the milestone during an innings in March 2002.

In the Second Test at Cape Town, Gilchrist struck 138 from 108 balls to set up a first innings lead and eventual four-wicket win. He then top-scored with 91 in the Third Test, and although Australia lost the match, Gilchrist ended the series with an astonishing 473 at 157.66 from just 474 balls, in addition to 14 dismissals.

Gilchrist captained the ODI team, once again for a single match, against Kenya in Nairobi during the PSO Tri-Nation Tournament. Despite Australia's unbeaten run in the competition, the final, against Pakistan was abandoned due to rain, so the teams shared the trophy. During the six middle months of 2002, Gilchrist played in 18 ODIs, scoring 562 runs at 31.22, including a century, recovering from his slump.

After scoring 122 runs at 40.66 in the 3–0 Test series clean sweep over Pakistan in the United Arab Emirates, Gilchrist went on to help the Australians retain The Ashes 4–1 in 2002–03, playing in all five matches of the series, finishing with 330 runs at 55.50 and taking 25 dismissals as wicket-keeper. After scoring fifties in the first two Tests, Gilchrist scored a counter-attacking 133 from 121 balls in the Fifth Test at the SCG, but was unable to prevent Australia's only loss of the series.

From the time of his debut up to the 2003 World Cup, Gilchrist's played in 40 Tests in series. With the exception of the 2001 tour of India, when he averaged 24.80 (he made 124 runs in the series; 122 of them came in one innings), his performances with the bat were such that he was described at the time as the "finest batsman-wicketkeeper to have graced the game". At one point in March 2002, Gilchrist's Test average was over 60; the second-highest for any established player in Test history, and he topped the ICC Test batting rankings in May 2002.

Gilchrist warmed up for the World Cup in South Africa by scoring 310 runs at 44.28 in the triangular tournament in Australia against England and Sri Lanka. His performances over the past year were recognised with the Allan Border Medal.

=== 2003 World Cup ===
Gilchrist played in all but one of the matches in Australia's successful defence of their World Cup title; he was rested for the group match against the Netherlands. He finished the tournament with 408 runs at an average of 40.80 at a strike rate of 105. He scored four half-centuries, and was run out against Sri Lanka in the Super Six stage just a single run short of a century. In the semi-final, he scored 22 before being caught off an inside-edge onto pad off the bowling of Aravinda de Silva. The umpire gave no reaction, however Gilchrist walked off the pitch after a moment's pause. In 2009 it was described as an "astonishing moment" drawing criticism from England's Angus Fraser, who "objected to him being canonised simply for not cheating", and from others who "thought that he walked almost by accident; that having played his shot he overbalanced in the direction of the pavilion." His actions nevertheless drew praise from the majority. In the final, India elected to field first and Gilchrist hammered 57 from 48 balls, featuring in a century opening stand with Hayden to seize the initiative. This laid the foundation for Australia's 2/359 and a crushing 125-run win, ending an unbeaten campaign. Gilchrist was also the competition's most successful wicketkeeper, making 21 dismissals.

Success in the World Cup was followed up by a tour of the West Indies where Gilchrist was part of a team that won both the ODI and Test series. He scored 282 runs at 70.50 with one century in the four Tests, and 212 runs at 35.33 in the ODIs. The Australians then defeated a touring Bangladeshi cricket team in short series in both forms of the game. Gilchrist was only sporadically required with the bat.

=== Decline and revival ===
After scoring his first Test century at his home ground in Perth, an unbeaten 113 against Zimbabwe, Gilchrist's Test form dipped again during the 2003–04 season, with only 120 runs coming in the next 10 innings, during the home series against India (drawn 1–1) and the away series in Sri Lanka (won 3–0). However, he returned to form in the Second Test Kandy, scoring a quickfire 144 in the second innings to set up a 27-run win after Australia conceded a 91-run first innings lead.

However, he maintained high standards in ODIs during this period, including 111 against India in Bangalore, 172 against Zimbabwe, just one run short of Mark Waugh's Australian record, and two further half-centuries in the VB Series in Australia. His success in One-day cricket was underlined by his rise to the top of the ICC ODI batting rankings in February 2004. However, he was unable to maintain this form on the 2004 tours of Sri Lanka, Zimbabwe and the Champions Trophy in England, accumulating 253 runs at 28.11 in 11 innings.

Gilchrist then scored 115 runs at 28.75 in two Tests at home to Sri Lanka in mid-2004, and captained in the First Test win in Darwin with Ponting absent. Australia won the series 1–0.

A 104 in the First Test against India in October 2004 proved to be a false renaissance; he scored only 104 runs in the remaining seven innings on the Indian tour and 139 runs in eight ODI innings towards the end of the 2004–05 season, which formed the lowest average period of Gilchrist's career until 2007. He took the captaincy of the Test team once again, in place of the injured Ricky Ponting, and led the Australian team to a historic 2–1 series victory in India, a feat last achieved in 1969. Ponting recovered to lead the team in the Fourth Test, Australia's only loss.

Gilchrist returned to form when New Zealand toured Australia at the start of southern hemisphere season. He scored 126 and 50 in the 2–0 Test series clean sweep and scored fifties in both ODIs. He then scored 230 runs at 76.66 in three Tests against Pakistan, including a rapid 113 in the Third Test at the SCG as Australia won all five Tests during the summer. He made it three successive Test centuries with 121 and 162 in the first two Tests on the tour of New Zealand, before ending with an unbeaten 60 in the Third Test; he totalled 343 runs at 114.33 for the series. His ODI form in the early part of 2005 remained moderate, with 308 runs at 28.00 during the southern summer.

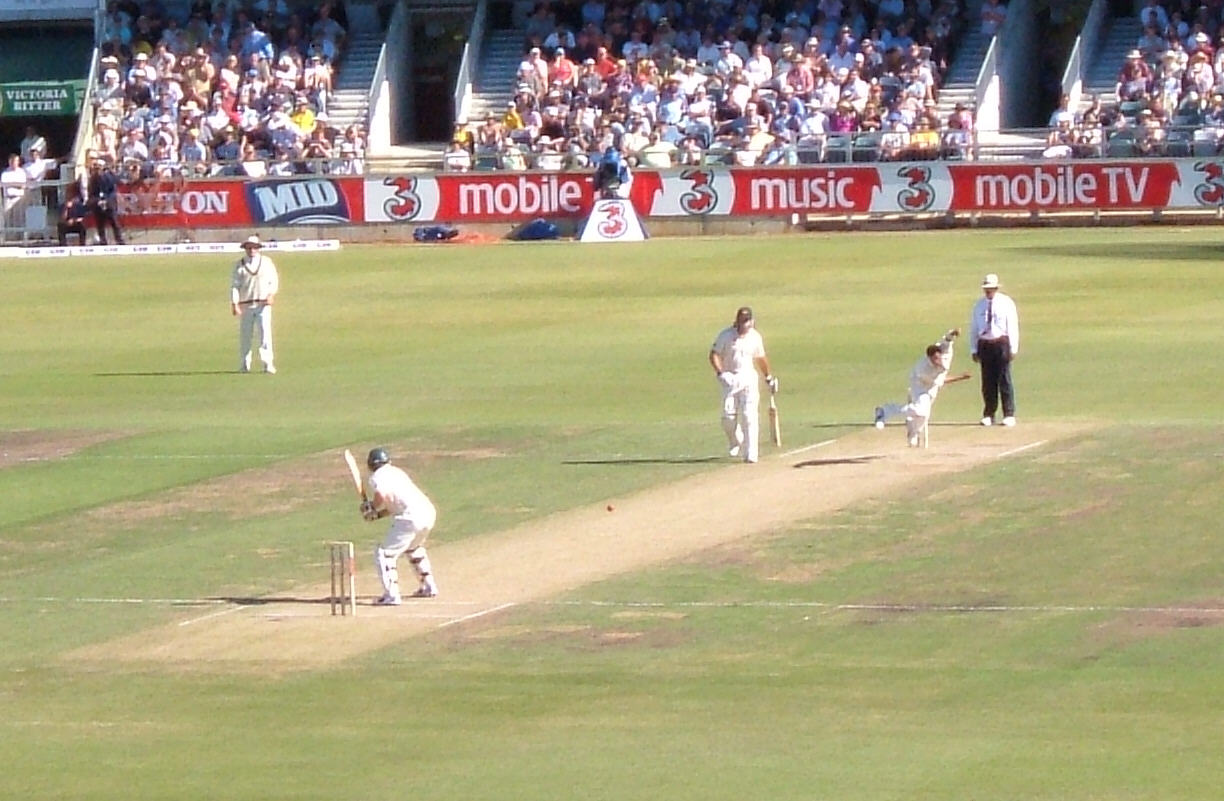
December 2005. At his home ground, the WACA, Gilchrist faces Makhaya Ntini, in the First Test, Australia v South Africa.

Gilchrist was in strong form ahead of the Tests, scoring 393 runs at 49.13 in the ODIs in England. The highlight was the 121 not out in the final game of the one-day NatWest Series, Gilchrist being awarded the man-of-the-match award. However, he performed poorly in the five Tests, with 204 runs at 25.50. Just as in India in 2001, Australia lost 2–1.

Australia and Gilchrist returned to form after the Ashes in the series against the ICC World XI. Gilchrist scored 45, 103 and 32 as Australia swept the ODIs 3–0, and top-scored with 94 in the first innings of the one-off Test, which Australia won. However, this did not transfer into the regular international matches. In six home Tests against the West Indies and South Africa in 2005–06, Gilchrist managed only 190 runs at 23.75, but Australia was unhindered, winning 3–0 and 2–0 respectively.

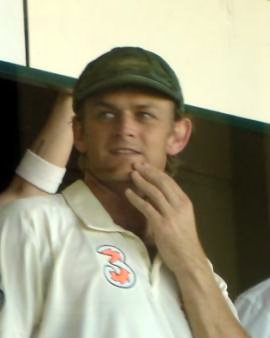
Gilchrist with Australia in 2006

His one-day form also began to suffer, scoring only 11 runs in three ODIs in New Zealand and 13 in the first two matches of the VB Series. He was rested for two games and returned to form against Sri Lanka on 29 January 2006 on his home ground, the WACA, hitting 116 runs off 105 balls to lead Australia to victory. He continued in this vein with the fastest ever century by an Australian in just 67 balls against Sri Lanka at the Gabba, ending with 122 as Australia won the deciding third final by nine wickets. After a slow start, he ended the series with 432 runs at 48.00.

The purple patch ended on the tour of South Africa and then Bangladesh. He scored 206 runs at 29.42 in five Tests and 248 runs at 35.42 in eight ODIs, inflated by a 144 in the First Test against Bangladesh. Despite this, Australia won all five Tests. Gilchrist scored 130 runs at 26.00, including a 92 against the West Indies as Australia won the 2006 Champions Trophy in India.

On 16 December 2006, during the Third Ashes Test at the WACA, Gilchrist scored a century in 57 balls, including twelve fours and four sixes, which at the time was the second fastest recorded Test century. At 97 runs from 54 balls, Gilchrist needed three runs from the next delivery to better Viv Richards' record set in 1986. The ball delivered by Matthew Hoggard was wide and Gilchrist was unable to score from it. He later claimed that the "batting pyrotechnics" had been the result of a miscommunication between Michael Clarke and him with the Australian captain Ricky Ponting; Gilchrist had actually been told not to score quick runs with a view to declaring the innings.

He ended the 2006–07 Ashes with a century and two fifties, totalling 229 runs at 45.80 at a strike rate of over 100 as Australia regained the Ashes with a 5–0 whitewash. It was an inconsistent series; aside from three scores mentioned, Gilchrist failed to pass one in his other three innings. Between Ashes series, Gilchrist had averaged only 25 with one Test century.

However, both he and Australia suffered a surprising string of poor results in the 2006–07 Commonwealth Bank Series, Gilchrist managing an average of only 22.20 during the tournament. Australia won seven of their eight qualifying matches, but England won with two finals victories over the Australians. Gilchrist scored 60 and 61 in the first two matches but did not pass 30 thereafter. He was then rested for Australia's winless three-match ODI tour of New Zealand, before his selection for the 2007 Cricket World Cup. Having previously indicated that it was highly likely that he would retire after the 2007 World Cup, he then stated a desire to play on afterwards.

=== 2007 World Cup ===
Gilchrist and Australia started their 2007 World Cup campaign by winning all three of their matches in Group A, against Scotland, the Netherlands and South Africa. Australia won all seven of their matches in the Super8 stage with little difficulty—the margins of victory exceeded 80 runs or six wickets in every instance. They topped the table and thus qualifying for a semi-final rematch against fourth-placed South Africa. Gilchrist opened the Australian batting in each match, taking a pinch-hitting role in the opening powerplays. Initially successful in the group matches, scoring 46, 57 and 42, he failed in the first Super8 match against West Indies (7), but bounced back to score a second half-century (59 not out) in a ten-wicket victory against Bangladesh in a match drastically shortened due to rain. After a run of middling scores, he failed again in the final Super8 match against New Zealand.

As a batsman, Gilchrist was dismissed for a single run in the semi-final against South Africa, despite which Australia won by seven wickets. Gilchrist opened the batting against Sri Lanka in the final. This was Gilchrist's third successive World Cup final, and the third time he scored at least 50 runs in a World Cup final and he went on to make his only ever century in a world cup match (his previous best World Cup score having been 99 against Sri Lanka in the 2003 tournament). Gilchrist went on to score 149 runs off 104 balls with thirteen fours and eight sixes, the highest individual score in a World Cup final, eclipsing his captain Ricky Ponting's score of 140 in the 2003 final. Australia won and he was named the man of the match. Subsequently there has been some controversy over Gilchrist's use of a squash ball inside his glove during this innings. The MCC stated that Gilchrist had not acted against the laws or the spirit of the game, since there is no restriction against the external or internal form of batting gloves.

Gilchrist batting at the MCG vs India on 2007-12-27 (video 0:16)

In September 2007, Gilchrist played in the inaugural World Twenty20. He scored 169 runs at 33.80 as Australia were knocked out by India in the semifinals. Gilchrist then scored 208 runs at 34.66 as Australia took an away ODI series against India 4–2. In November, Gilchrist's peers voted him the greatest Australian ODI cricketer ever, for which he was awarded an honour at an ACA function before Australia's second Test against Sri Lanka. He was only required to bat once in the Tests, and made 67 not out as Australia swept Sri Lanka aside 2–0.

=== Retirement ===
On 26 January 2008 during the 4th and final Test of the 2007–08 series against India, Gilchrist announced that he would retire from international cricket at the end of the season. A back injury kept Ricky Ponting off the field for sections of the Indian's second innings, resulting in Gilchrist captaining the team for part of the final two days of his Test cricket career. India batted out the match for a draw, so Gilchrist's 14 in the first innings was his final Test innings; he took his 379th and final catch when Virender Sehwag was caught behind. Gilchrist had scored only 150 runs at 21.42 in his final Test series.

John Buchanan, who coached Australia during most of Gilchrist's international career, predicted that Gilchrist's retirement would have more impact than the previous year's retirements of Damien Martyn, Glenn McGrath, Shane Warne and Justin Langer and Australian Prime Minister Kevin Rudd asked Gilchrist to reconsider. Gilchrist later revealed that he chose to retire after dropping VVS Laxman during the first innings, and realising that he had lost his "competitive edge." He played out the summer's ODI series, before ending in disappointment when India beat Australia 2–0 in the 2007–08 Commonwealth Bank Series finals. Gilchrist managed only seven and two in the finals. His highlight of the series was his scoring 118 and being named Man of the Match in his final match at his adopted home in Perth on 15 February 2008, against Sri Lanka. He ended his final series with 322 runs at 32.20.

== Playing style ==
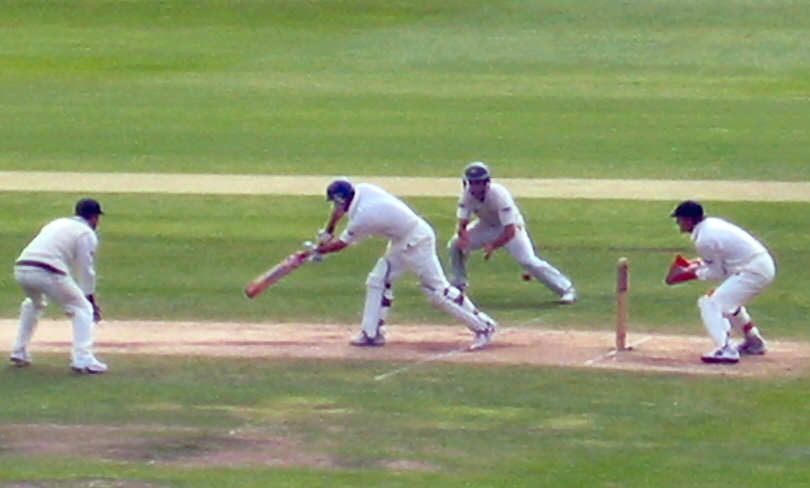
Gilchrist standing up to Shane Warne in 2005. Andrew Strauss is the batsman.

Gilchrist's attacking batting was a key part of Australia's one-day success, as he usually opened the batting. He was a part of the successful 1999, 2003 and 2007 Cricket World Cup campaigns. Gilchrist's Test batting average in the upper 40s is unusually high for a wicket-keeper. He retired from Test cricket at 45th on the all–time list of highest batting averages. At the end of his Test career he had established a Test strike-rate of 82 runs per hundred balls, at the time the third highest since balls were recorded in full. His combination of attack and consistency create one of the most dynamic world cricketers ever, playing shots to all areas of the field with uncommon timing. He was second on the all-time list of most sixes in Tests at 100 with only Brendon McCullum ahead of him with 107. Gilchrist's skills as a wicket-keeper were sometimes questioned; some claimed that he was the best keeper in Australia whilst others that Victorian wicket-keeper Darren Berry was the best Australian wicket-keeper of the 1990s and early 2000s. Gilchrist attributed his batting techniques from early training with his father, where he would defend shots, sometimes only gripping the bat with his top (right) hand, and would end a session to simply play attacking shots with tennis balls to end on a positive and fun note. He also adopted a naturally high grip where both hands were closer to the end of the handle for more top hand control.

Gilchrist successfully kept wicket for fast bowlers Glenn McGrath and Brett Lee for most of his international career. His partnerships with McGrath and Lee are second and fourth respectively in both test and ODI history for the number of wickets taken. With Alec Stewart and Mark Boucher, he shares the record for most catches (6) by a wicketkeeper in a ODI match, having achieved this feat five times. In 2007 he took six dismissals and scored a half century in the same ODI for the second time; he remains the only player to do so even once. At Old Trafford in August 2005, he passed Alec Stewart's world record of 4,540 runs as a Test wicketkeeper, and at his retirement in 2008, he was the most successful ODI wicket-keeper with 472 dismissals (417 catches and 55 stumpings), more than 80 dismissals ahead of his closest rival, Mark Boucher. This record was surpassed seven years later by Kumar Sangakkara.

== Walking and discipline ==
It is unusual for professional batsmen to "walk"; that is, to agree that they have been dismissed and leave the field of play without waiting for (or contrary to) an umpire's decision. Gilchrist reignited this debate by walking during a high-profile match, the 2003 World Cup semi-final against Sri Lanka, after the umpire ruled him to be not out. He has since proclaimed himself to be "a walker", or a batsman who will consistently walk, and has done so on numerous occasions. On one occasion against Bangladesh, Gilchrist walked but TV replays failed to suggest any contact between his bat and the ball. Without such contact, he could not have been caught out. Ricky Ponting has declared on several occasions that he is not a walker but will leave it to each player to decide whether they wish to walk or not. While no other Australian top-order batsmen have expressly declared themselves to be walkers, lower-order batsmen Jason Gillespie and Michael Kasprowicz both walked during Test matches in India in 2004. In 2004, New Zealand captain Stephen Fleming accused Gilchrist of conducting a "walking crusade" when Craig McMillan refused to walk after Gilchrist had caught him off an edge from the bowling of Jason Gillespie in the First Test in Brisbane. After the appeal was turned down by the umpire, who did not hear the edge, Gilchrist goaded McMillan about the edge, and McMillan's angry response was picked up by the stump microphone: "...not everyone is walking, Gilly ... not everyone has to walk, mate...". The taunt was arguably effective, however, as McMillan, perhaps distracted, missed the next ball and was given out leg before wicket. Gilchrist said in his autobiography that he had "zero support in the team" for his stance and that he felt that the topic made the dressing room uncomfortable. He added that he "felt isolated" and "silently accused of betraying the team. Implicitly I was made to feel selfish, as if I was walking for the sake of my own clean image, thereby making everyone else look dishonest."

Gilchrist has been noted for his emotional outbursts on the cricket field, and has been fined multiple times for dissent against umpiring decisions. In January 2006, he was fined 40% of his match fee in an ODI against South Africa. In another instance, in early 2004 in Sri Lanka, Gilchrist audibly argued with umpire Peter Manuel after batting partner Andrew Symonds was given out. After the argument concluded, Manuel consulted umpiring partner Billy Bowden and reversed his decision, recalling Symonds to the crease. Gilchrist was also reprimanded by the Australian Cricket Board for publicly questioning the legality of Muttiah Muralitharan's bowling action in 2002, as his comments were found to be in breach of the clause in the player code of conduct relating to "detrimental public comment".

During the 2003 World Cup, Gilchrist accused Pakistani wicket-keeper Rashid Latif of making a racist remark towards him while the latter was batting in their group match. Latif who was cleared by match referee Clive Lloyd, threatened to sue Gilchrist for this claim.

== Achievements ==
=== Awards ===
Gilchrist was one of five Wisden Cricketers of the Year for 2002, and Australia's One-day International Player of the Year in 2003 and 2004. He was awarded the Allan Border Medal in 2003, and was the only Australian cricketer who was a current player at the time to have been named in "Richie Benaud's Greatest XI" in 2004. He was selected in the ICC World XI for the charity series against the ACC Asian XI, 2004–05, was voted as "World's Scariest Batsman" in a poll of international bowlers, and was named as wicket-keeper and opening batsman in Australia's "greatest ever ODI team." In a poll of over ten thousand people hosted in 2007 by ESPNcricinfo, he was voted the ninth greatest all-rounder of the last one hundred years. A panel of prominent cricket writers selected him in Australia's all-time best XI for ESPNcricinfo. In 2010, Gilchrist was made a Member of the Order of Australia (AM) for his services to cricket and the community. He was inducted into the Sport Australia Hall of Fame in 2012. On 9-December-2013, ICC announced that they had inducted Gilchrist in the prestigious ICC Hall of Fame. He was named an Australia Post Legend of Cricket in 2021.

=== Test match performance ===
		Batting				Fielding	
Opposition	Matches	Runs	Average	High score	100s / 50s	Catches	Stumpings
Bangladesh	4	199	66.33	144	1 / 0	14	1
England	20	1,111	46.29	152*	3 / 7	89	7
ICC World XI	1	95	47.50	94	0 / 1	5	2
India	14	659	27.89	122	2 / 2	48	2
New Zealand	11	923	76.91	162	4 / 5	38	3
Pakistan	9	616	68.44	149*	2 / 3	34	4
South Africa	12	754	47.12	204*	2 / 2	39	5
Sri Lanka	7	383	42.55	144	1 / 2	32	5
West Indies	12	575	47.91	101*	1 / 4	46	6
Zimbabwe	1	133	133.00	133*	1 / 0	9	2
Overall	92	5,448	47.60	204*	17 / 25	354	37

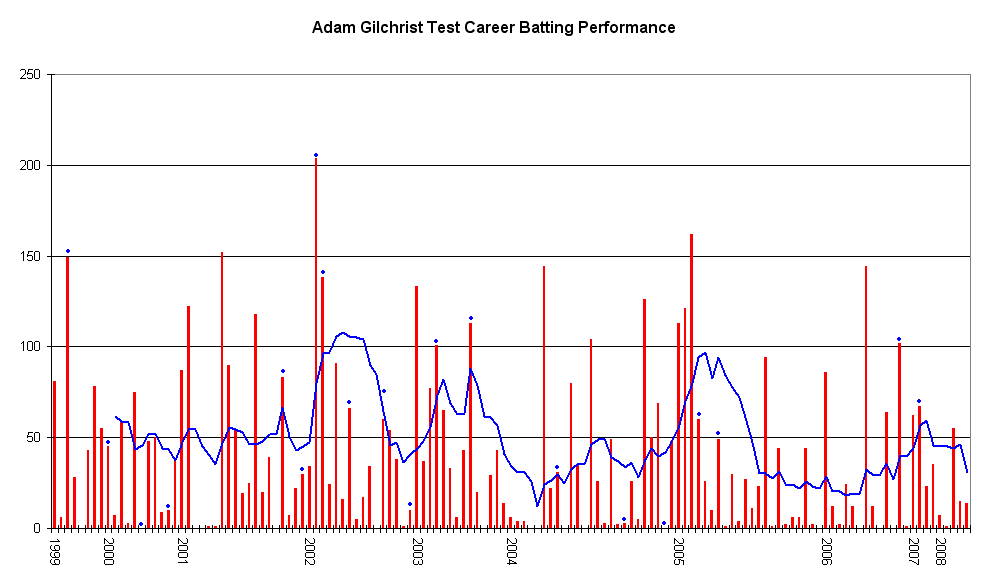
An innings–by–innings breakdown of Gilchrist's Test match batting career, showing runs scored (red bars) and the average of the last ten innings (blue line).

=== ODI highlights ===
		Batting				Fielding	
Opposition	Matches	Runs	Average	High score	100s / 50s	Catches	Stumpings
Asia XI	1	24	24.00	24	0 / 0	1	1
Bangladesh	12	444	55.50	76	0 / 5	23	4
England	35	1087	32.94	124	2 / 6	60	4
ICC World XI	3	180	60.00	103	1 / 0	2	0
India	40	1568	41.26	111	1 / 12	63	4
Ireland	1	34	34.00	34	0 / 0	0	0
Kenya	3	130	43.33	67	0 / 1	4	1
Namibia	1	13	13.00	13	0 / 0	6	0
Netherlands	1	57	57.00	57	0 / 1	0	1
New Zealand	41	1195	31.45	128	2 / 7	55	6
Pakistan	24	761	33.08	103	1 / 5	39	5
Scotland	2	52	26.00	46	0 / 0	3	1
South Africa	44	1127	28.18	105	2 / 6	60	9
Sri Lanka	27	1243	45.76	154	5 / 2	27	6
United States	1	24	–	24*	0 / 0	2	0
West Indies	25	735	30.63	98	0 / 5	33	4
Zimbabwe	15	572	38.13	172	1 / 2	20	6
Overall	268	9038	38.69	172	15 / 50	386	50

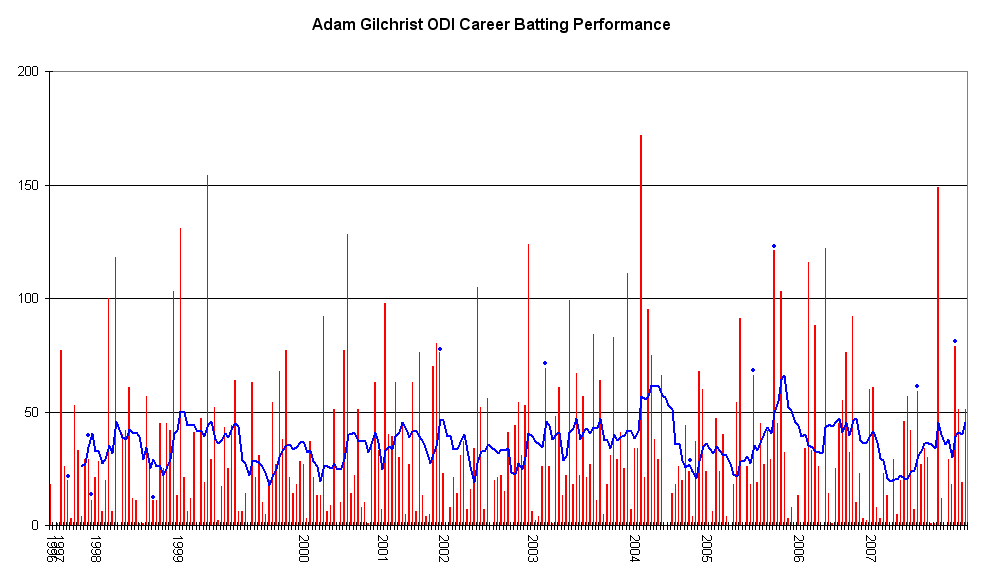
An innings–by–innings breakdown of Gilchrist's ODI batting career, showing runs scored (red bars) and the average of the last ten innings (blue line).

=== Career best performances ===
	Batting			
	Score	Fixture	Venue	Season
Test	204*	South Africa v Australia	Wanderers Stadium, Johannesburg	2003
ODI	172	Australia v Zimbabwe	Bellerive Oval, Hobart	2004
T20I	48	Australia v England	SCG, Sydney	2007
FC	204*	South Africa v Australia	Wanderers Stadium, Johannesburg	2003
LA	172	Australia v Zimbabwe	Bellerive Oval, Hobart	2004
T20	109*	Mumbai Indians v Deccan Chargers	DY Patil Stadium, Mumbai	2008

== Autobiography ==
Gilchrist's autobiography True Colours, published in 2008, was the subject of much controversy. Gilchrist questioned the integrity of leading Indian batsman Sachin Tendulkar in relation to the evidence he presented in the Monkeygate dispute, which was about allegations of racism against Harbhajan Singh. The autobiography said that Tendulkar told the first hearing that he could not hear what Harbhajan said to Andrew Symonds; Gilchrist said that he was "certain he "Tendulkar" was telling the truth" because he was "a fair way away". Gilchrist then questioned why Tendulkar then agreed with Harbhajan's claim at the second hearing that the exchange was an obscenity, and concluded that the process was "a joke". He also raised questions over Tendulkar's sportsmanship and said he was "hard to find for a changing-room handshake after we have beaten India".

There was a backlash in India, which forced Gilchrist to clarify his position. Gilchrist later insisted that he did not accuse Tendulkar of lying in his testimony. He also denied calling the Indian a "bad sport" in regards to the handshake issue. Tendulkar responded by saying that "those remarks came from someone who doesn't know me enough. I think he made loose statements...I reminded him that I was the first person to shake hands after the Sydney defeat." The autobiography also blamed the ICC for allowing Sri Lankan cricketer Muralitharan to bowl; Gilchrist believes that ICC changed the throwing law to legitimise a bowling action that he regards as illegitimate. The law change was described as "a load of horse crap. That's rubbish." Gilchrist claimed that Muralitharan threw the ball and alleged that the ICC protected him because Sri Lankan cricket authorities portrayed any criticism of the bowler's legitimacy as racism and a witch-hunt conducted by whites. In response to these comments, former Sri Lankan captain Marvan Atapattu said that by questioning the credentials of players like Muralitharan and Tendulkar, Gilchrist had done no good to his own reputation.

== Charity, media, business career and political work ==
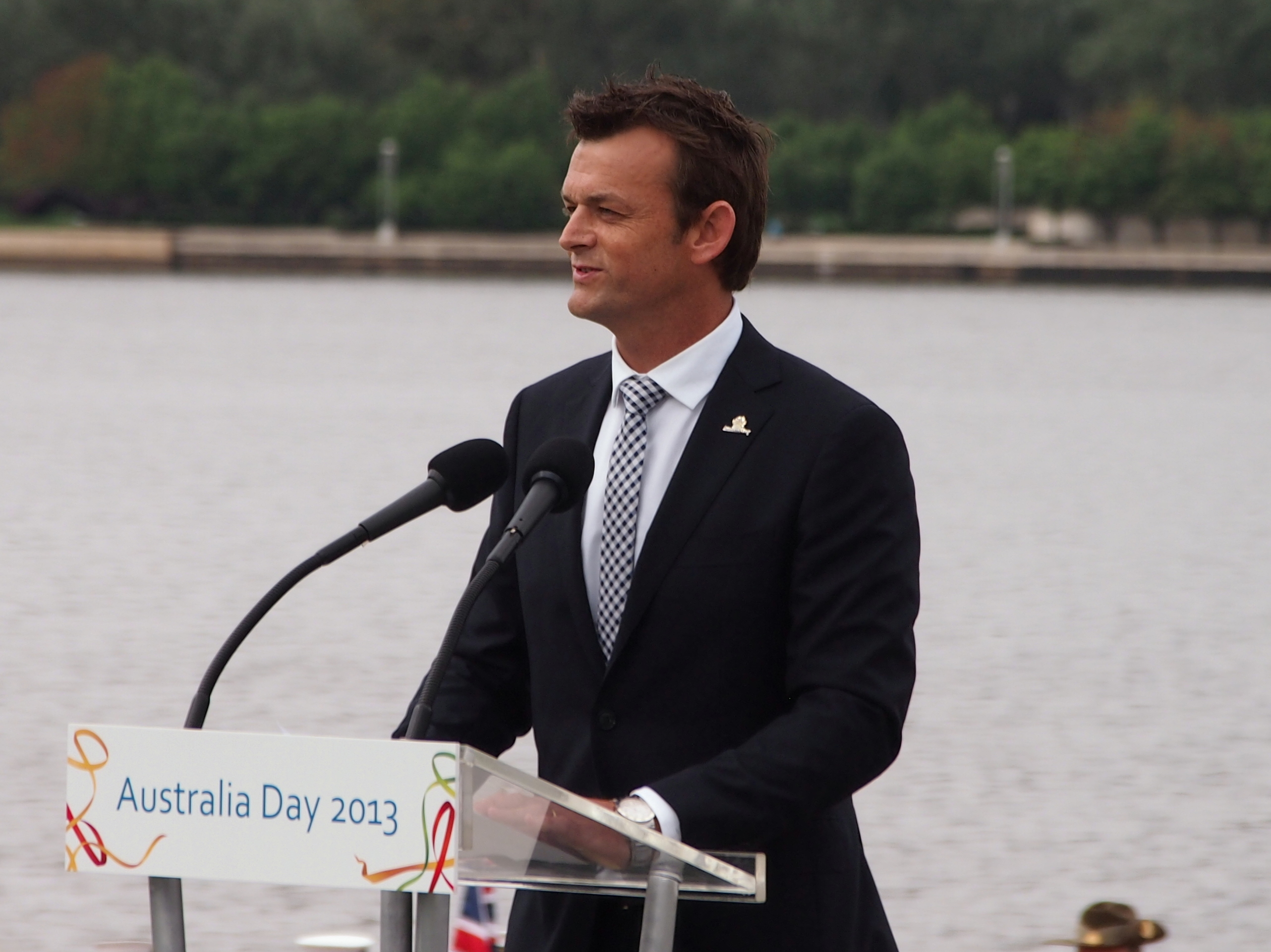
Adam Gilchrist speaking at the 2013 National Flag Raising and Citizenship ceremony in Canberra

Outside cricket, Gilchrist is an ambassador for the charity World Vision in India, a country in which he is popular due to his cricketing achievements, and sponsors a boy whose father has died. He was approached in early 2005 by the US baseball franchise, the Boston Red Sox, with a view to him playing for them when his cricket career ended. However, he was selected for the 2007 Cricket World Cup and announced his retirement from Test and One-Day cricket in early 2008.

In March 2008, Gilchrist joined the Nine Network. Gilchrist has appeared as one of a panel of revolving co-hosts for the revived Wide World of Sports Weekend Edition. He made his debut on the program in March 2008, and commentates on Fox Sport's cricket coverage during the Australian summer. In 2013 Gilchrist joined Ricky Ponting and various other names in cricket to commentate for Channel Ten in the third series of the Big Bash League.

As Amway Australia Ambassador, Gilchrist has played a role in many of their charity events. In August 2010, he presented the Freedom Wheels program, an initiative to provide modified bikes to kids with disabilities, a cheque for $20,000.

Gilchrist was the chair of the National Australia Day Council from 2008 to 2014. In 2008, Gilchrist supported debate on whether Australia Day should be moved to a new date because the current date marks British settlement of New South Wales and is offensive to many Aboriginal Australians.

Gilchrist has had a number of company directorships outside of cricket. His appointment to the board of ASX listed sandalwood company TFS Corporation, committee member of Commonwealth Business Forum in Perth and director of Travelex. The appointment to TFS Corporation was not without controversy when as a board member of TFS he was named as a plaintiff suing his own TFS shareholders for defamation

In October 2025, Gilchist launched 'El Arquero' Tequila, created by Destiladora de Los Altos distillery , a 3rd Generation family-owned business. El Arquero, is spanish for 'the keeper'

Gilchrist also plays himself on the Australian comedy series How to Stay Married.

== Books ==
- Cashman, Richard; Franks, Warwick; Maxwell, Jim; Sainsbury, Erica; Stoddart, Brian; Weaver, Amanda; Webster, Ray (1997). The A–Z of Australian cricketers. Melbourne, Victoria: Oxford University Press. ISBN 978-0-9756746-1-1.
- Haigh, Gideon; Frith, David (2007). Inside story:unlocking Australian cricket's archives. Southbank, Victoria: News Custom Publishing. ISBN 978-1-921116-00-1.
- Harte, Chris; Whimpress, Bernard (2003). The Penguin History of Australian Cricket. Camberwell, Victoria: Penguin Books Australia. ISBN 978-0-670-04133-6.

Sporting positions
Preceded by Shaun Udal	Interim Middlesex Cricket Captain; 11–24 June 2010	Succeeded by Neil Dexter
Awards
Preceded by Matthew Hayden	Allan Border Medal; 2003	Succeeded by Ricky Ponting
