= 2005 ICC Super Series =

Cricket series held in Australia

ICC Super Series
- The official logo of the Johnnie Walker Super Series
- Administrator: ICC
- Format: Test and ODI
- First edition: 2005
- Latest edition: 2005
- Tournament format: Series
- Number of teams: 2
- Current champion: Australia (both Test and ODI)
- Most successful: Australia 2 titles (Test and ODI)
- Most runs: (Australia) Adam Gilchrist (275)
- Most wickets: (Australia) Stuart MacGill (9)

The ICC Super Series 2005 was a cricket series held in Australia during October 2005, organised by the International Cricket Council (ICC). It was played between Australia (the world's top-ranked side at the time) and a World XI team of players selected from other countries. The series consisted of three One Day Internationals and one Test match. Australia won all 4 of them.

The matches attracted small crowds and were not competitive, in part because the ICC World XI had only one warm-up game to gel as a team. The Super Series concept had been controversial from its first proposal. The ICC's intention was to showcase the world's best players and provide a close contest with Australia, who had dominated international cricket for several years. However, many fans and experts dismissed the Super Series as a gimmick, comparing it unfavourably with the 2005 Ashes Series.
The ICC had intended to hold a Super Series every four years, but the concept was not repeated.

== Background ==
In the late 1990s and early 2000s, the Australian cricket side had become completely dominant in world cricket, and had a reputation of being unbeatable. In this climate, the concept of gathering the world's best players into one team to challenge them was born, and the ICC Super Series was developed.

== Fixtures ==
- Warm-up match: Junction Oval, Melbourne, VIC
  - ICC World XI vs. Victoria – 2 October
- One Day Internationals: Telstra Dome, Melbourne, VIC
  - Game 1 – 5 October
  - Game 2 – 7 October
  - Game 3 – 9 October
- Super Test: Sydney Cricket Ground, Sydney, NSW
  - 14 to 19 October

== Teams ==
=== Team Selectors - Australia ===
The Australian squads were announced on 20 September, and the axe fell on the lacklustre performers on the team during the recent Ashes series. Damien Martyn was dropped from the Test side in favour of Brad Hodge but retained his one-day spot. Stuart MacGill and Shane Watson, who toured England but did not play in any of the Ashes Tests, were included in the lineup. Jason Gillespie and Michael Kasprowicz were not included in the Test squad or the ODI squad, while James Hopes received a surprise call-up for the ODI side following his 146 in a first-class game for Australia A on their tour of Pakistan in September 2005.

=== Team Selectors - ICC World XI ===
The World XI selectors named a shortlist, from which the 11 Test players were named. The selection panel comprised:

- Sunil Gavaskar of India (chairman)
- Mike Atherton of England
- Sir Richard Hadlee of New Zealand
- Sir Clive Lloyd of the West Indies
- Jonty Rhodes of South Africa
- Aravinda de Silva of Sri Lanka

The shortlist they named was: Andrew Flintoff (England), Steve Harmison (England), Michael Vaughan (England), Rahul Dravid (India), Virender Sehwag (India), Sachin Tendulkar (India), Anil Kumble (India), Brendon McCullum (New Zealand), Daniel Vettori (New Zealand), Shoaib Akhtar (Pakistan), Inzamam-ul-Haq (Pakistan), Younis Khan (Pakistan), Mark Boucher (South Africa), Jacques Kallis (South Africa), Makhaya Ntini (South Africa), Shaun Pollock (South Africa), Graeme Smith (South Africa), Muttiah Muralitharan (Sri Lanka), Brian Lara (West Indies), Shivnarine Chanderpaul (West Indies)

The ICC World squads were announced on 23 August 2005, with additions on 23 September due to injuries to two players. Of the players in the final squads, five were from South Africa, three each were from England and Pakistan, two each were from India, Sri Lanka and West Indies, and one was from New Zealand. Zimbabwe and Bangladesh were unrepresented.

After first being reduced to 13, who travelled to Australia, the final 11 players to take the field were selected by the Chairman of Selectors, Sunil Gavaskar in consultation with the appointed team director, the coach and captain of the team, who will be appointed by the selection panel. The colour of the ICC World XI's uniform was predominantly blue and black. The coach of the team was India's former coach John Wright.

=== Squads for the Six Day Test Match ===
Australia			ICC World XI		
Player's Name	National Cricket Team	Team Role	Player's Name	National Cricket Team	Team Role
Ricky Ponting (c)	Australia	RHB, RM	Graeme Smith (c)	South Africa	LHB, OB
Adam Gilchrist (vc)	Australia	WK, LHB	Mark Boucher (Note: Ireland's Niall O'Brien was called up to replace South Africa's Mark Boucher, who had visa issues, however he was able to play.)	South Africa	WK, RHB
Michael Clarke	Australia	RHB, SLA	Rahul Dravid (vc)	India	RHB, OB
Matthew Hayden	Australia	LHB, RM	Shoaib Akhtar	Pakistan	RHB, RF
Brad Hodge	Australia	RHB, OB	Andrew Flintoff	England	RHB, RF
Simon Katich	Australia	LHB, SLC	Steve Harmison	England	RHB, RF
Justin Langer	Australia	LHB, RM	Inzamam-ul-Haq (Note: Inzamam-ul-Haq replaced India's Sachin Tendulkar, who was originally in the Test squad, but withdrew following an injury.)	Pakistan	RHB, SLA
Brett Lee	Australia	RHB, RF	Jacques Kallis	South Africa	RHB, RFM
Stuart MacGill	Australia	RHB, LB	Brian Lara	West Indies	LHB, LBG
Glenn McGrath	Australia	RHB, RFM	Muttiah Muralitharan	Sri Lanka	RHB, OB
Shane Warne	Australia	RHB, LB	Shaun Pollock	South Africa	RHB, RFM
Shane Watson	Australia	RHB, RFM	Virender Sehwag	India	RHB, OB
			Daniel Vettori	New Zealand	LHB, SLA

Statistics are correct as of 19 October 2005, after the only Test match played to date by the World XI

ICC World XI Test cricketers				Batting							Bowling						Fielding	
Cap	Name	Career	Mat	Inn	NO	Runs	HS	Avg	100	50	Balls	Mdn	Runs	Wkt	Best	Avg	Ca	St
1	(South Africa) Mark Boucher (wicket-keeper)	2005	1	2	–	17	17	8.50	–	–	–	–	–	–	–	–	2	–
2	(India) Rahul Dravid	2005	1	2	–	23	23	11.50	–	–	–	–	–	–	–	–	1	–
3	(England) Andrew Flintoff	2005	1	2	–	50	35	20.50	–	–	204	5	107	7	4/59	15.29	–	–
4	(England) Steve Harmison	2005	1	2	–	1	1	0.50	–	–	183	5	101	4	3/41	25.25	–	–
5	(Pakistan) Inzamam-ul-Haq	2005	1	2	–	1	1	0.50	–	–	–	–	–	–	–	–	–	–
6	(South Africa) Jacques Kallis	2005	1	2	1	83	44	83.00	–	–	60	2	58	1	1/3	58.00	4	–
7	(Cricket West Indies) Brian Lara	2005	1	2	–	41	36	25.00	–	–	–	–	–	–	–	–	–	–
8	(Sri Lanka) Muttiah Muralitharan	2005	1	2	–	2	2	1.00	–	–	324	7	157	5	3/55	31.40	2	–
9	(India) Virender Sehwag	2005	1	2	–	83	76	41.50	–	1	–	–	–	–	–	–	1	–
10	(South Africa) Graeme Smith	2005	1	2	–	12	12	6.00	–	–	–	–	–	–	–	–	3	–
11	(New Zealand) Daniel Vettori	2005	1	2	1	8	8*	8.00	–	–	162	3	111	1	1/73	111.00	–	–

=== Squads for the Three One-day Internationals ===
Australia			ICC World XI		
Player's Name	National cricket team	Team Role	Player's Name	National cricket team	Team Role
Ricky Ponting (c)	Australia	RHB, RM	Shaun Pollock (c)	South Africa	RHB, RFM
Adam Gilchrist	Australia	WK, LHB	Kumar Sangakkara	Sri Lanka	WK, LHB
Nathan Bracken	Australia	RHB, LFM	Shahid Afridi	Pakistan	RHB, LBG
Stuart Clark (Note: Brad Hogg (who was originally called up for ODIs only) and Shaun Tait (called up for both Tests and ODIs) both withdrew from the Australian squad due to injuries. No replacement was named in the Test squad, but Stuart Clark and Cameron White were called up for the ODIs.)	Australia	RHB, RFM	Shoaib Akhtar	Pakistan	RHB, RF
Michael Clarke	Australia	RHB, SLA	Rahul Dravid (Note: Dravid and Gayle replaced Tendulkar and South Africa's Herschelle Gibbs, who were both originally in the ODI squad, but withdrew due to injuries.)	India	RHB, OB
James Hopes	Australia	RHB, RM	Andrew Flintoff	England	RHB, RF
Mike Hussey	Australia	LHB, RM	Chris Gayle	West Indies	RHB, OB
Simon Katich	Australia	LHB, SLC	Jacques Kallis	South Africa	RHB, RFM
Brett Lee	Australia	RHB, RF	Brian Lara	West Indies	LHB, LBG
Damien Martyn	Australia	RHB, RM	Muttiah Muralitharan	Sri Lanka	RHB, OB
Glenn McGrath	Australia	RHB, RFM	Makhaya Ntini	South Africa	RHB, RF
Andrew Symonds	Australia	RHB, OB	Kevin Pietersen	England	RHB, OB
Shane Watson	Australia	RHB, RFM	Virender Sehwag	India	RHB, OB
Cameron White	Australia	RHB, LB	Daniel Vettori	New Zealand	LHB, SLA

== Status of the matches ==
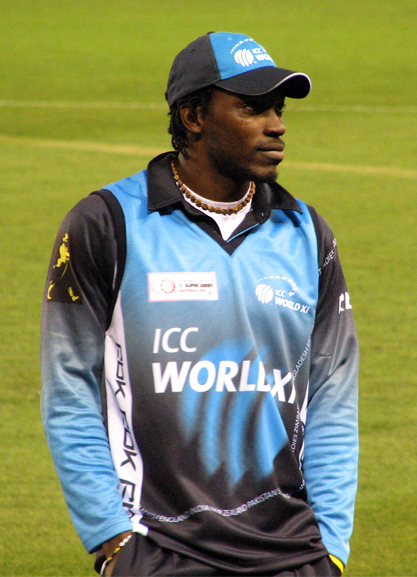
Chris Gayle in an ODI match

The International Cricket Council declared that the matches would count as official One Day Internationals and Test matches. Some previous matches, such as the series between England and the Rest of the World in 1970, were initially regarded as Test matches, perhaps in the interests of attracting a sponsor, but later stripped of Test status by the ICC. At first it was unclear whether the Super Series matches would be recognised as official internationals, but following the decision to recognise the World Cricket Tsunami Appeal match as an official ODI, the ICC decided to award official status to the Super Series matches too. Apart from fixtures in which Caribbean islands and territories of the former British Empire compete together as the West Indies, this was the first official Test match not between two countries. This decision proved controversial among players and writers alike.

Cricket historians have generally opposed the decision because of inconsistency in that the 1970 Rest of the World series in England is not accorded Test status, although those matches were advertised as Test matches at the time. Officially, however, Test status seems unlikely to be withdrawn from the 2005 Super Test in part because of the effect on noted cricket records; for instance without the wickets taken in this match, Muttiah Muralitharan would fall slightly short of 800 career test wickets. Statisticians such as Bill Frindall have said that they will not recognise the ruling and will exclude the matches from their records. Although it has been said that this "raises the possibility of two competing sets of cricket statistics being in circulation", that has always been a reality because there has never been a standard for match status and statisticians have always used their own match lists.

Many current and former Test cricketers also joined in the debate. For example, former Australian captain Allan Border said: "I firmly believe that this status should be restricted to matches between national sides. Test cricket is an institution that has been built up over a period of 128 years, and it should not be tampered with". (Although arguably this overlooks the anomaly related to the West Indies, as well as the fact that Australia and South Africa both competed in what are now deemed test matches in the nineteenth century prior to formal political unification.) Conversely, Tony Greig, who played for the Rest of the World against Australia in 1971–1972, said "My understanding of the status of first-class and Test cricket is related to the standard of the players. These are all Test cricketers... [The 1971–72 matches] were played like Tests and were deadly serious. "

The matches themselves were characterised by poor crowds (half empty grounds) and lacklustre performances by the World XI. Former England batsman Geoffrey Boycott described the series as a "bunfight" and said that there was "nothing that resembled cricket" in it. The authoritative publication The Wisden Cricketer summed up the Test match as follows: " [it] was a terrible game of cricket. It had a small crowd, little meaning and was forgotten quickly." The World XI players seemed to be there more for fun than anything else. Andrew Flintoff came up with some refreshingly honest statements amidst all the bullish officials: "I've got the Super Series in two weeks' time. I can't think of anything worse," he said, adding on arrival; "I'm only here for the food."

Captain Graeme Smith admitted to frustration in the aftermath of the series, saying he found it hard to deal with the fact that there weren't any repercussions to 'losing so badly'

== Match reports ==
=== Warm-up: Victoria v ICC World XI (2 October) ===
2 October 2005
Scorecard

ICC World XI; 281/8 (50 overs)	v	Victoria; 269/9 (50 overs)
Rahul Dravid (IND) 66 (80); Shane Harwood 4/37 (10 overs)		Brad Hodge 92 (116); Shoaib Akhtar (PAK) 2/29 (10 overs)

ICC World XI won by 12 runs
Junction Oval, Melbourne
Umpires: Aleem Dar (Pak) and Rudi Koertzen (SA)
Player of the match: None

- No coin toss. Both sides agreed to ICC World XI batting first.
- 13 per side (11 to bat and field)

In a practice match preceding the first One Day International, a fifty over game was arranged against a strong Victorian side. The game was thirteen-a-side, but with only eleven players allowed to bat and eleven to field. Andrew Flintoff was allowed to rest, with the other World XI players all playing. By agreement the World XI batted first, but they fared badly as they collapsed from 63 for no loss to 131 for 6, with Shane Harwood taking 4 for 37. Rahul Dravid's knock of 66 off 80 balls and Shaun Pollock's cameo of 54 not out off only 38 balls rescued the innings, which finished on a competitive 281 for 8. Victoria came close in reply, with Brad Hodge top-scoring with 92 before succumbing to Muttiah Muralitharan.

Scorecard

=== First ODI: Australia v ICC World XI (5 October) ===
5 October 2005 (D/N)
Scorecard

Australia; 255/8 (50 overs)	v	ICC World XI; 162 (41.3 overs)
Simon Katich 58 (78); Daniel Vettori (NZ) 4/33 (10 overs)		Kumar Sangakkara (SL) 64 (94); Shane Watson 3/43 (10 overs)

Australia won by 93 runs
Telstra Dome, Melbourne
Umpires: Aleem Dar (Pak) and Simon Taufel (Aus)
Player of the match: Shane Watson (Aus)

- Australia won the toss and elected to bat.
- Cameron White (Aus) made his ODI debut.

Australia won the toss and captain Ricky Ponting elected to bat first. They got off to a good start, with Gilchrist and Katich putting on 80 runs in only 14 overs before Gilchrist was bowled by Kallis. Katich and Ponting put on 48 in the next eight overs, and at 1 for 128 after 22.1 overs, Australia looked to be heading for a big score. But after that wickets fell regularly, with the spinners Muralitharan and Vettori working their way steadily through the middle order to restrict Australia to 8 for 255 at the end of their 50 overs.

The ICC World XI never looked like challenging this total. They lost five of their top six batsmen – Sehwag, Kallis, Lara, Dravid and Pietersen – for single figures, to collapse to 5 for 82 inside 22 overs. Only Sangakkara's innings gave any hope, but when he was out for 64 to leave the ICC World XI on 6 for 101, needing 7 runs an over off the last 22 overs, the game was over. Australia eventually wrapped up the ICC World XI's innings for 162 to record a comprehensive 93-run victory.

Scorecard

=== Second ODI: Australia v ICC World XI (7 October) ===
7 October 2005 (D/N)
Scorecard

Australia; 328/4 (50 overs)	v	ICC World XI; 273 (45.3 overs)
Adam Gilchrist 103 (79); Virender Sehwag (IND) 1/20 (3 overs)		Kumar Sangakkara (SL) 61 (44); Nathan Bracken 3/43 (7.3 overs)

Australia won by 55 runs
Telstra Dome, Melbourne
Umpires: Rudi Koertzen (SA) and Darrell Hair (Aus)
Player of the match: Adam Gilchrist (Aus)

- Australia won the toss and elected to bat.
- Stuart Clark (Aus) made his ODI debut.

Australia won the toss and captain Ricky Ponting elected to bat first. They got off to a good start, with Gilchrist and Katich quickly putting on 110 runs before Katich was bowled by a doosra from Muralitharan. Gilchrist and Ponting put on 63, with Gilchrist reaching his century off 73 balls, before missing a straight Sehwag delivery. Martyn and Ponting consolidated in a 103-run stand, working singles around. On 276, Ponting failed to beat Flintoff to the stumps at the other end and Martyn was bowled next ball, giving the World XI a sniff. However, Andrew Symonds and Michael Clarke pushed the Australian total comfortably past 300, with 4 for 328 at the end of their 50 overs. Every bowler was taken to, except for Muralitharan, who finished with 1 for 43 off 10 overs.

The ICC World XI initially looked like challenging this total. Chris Gayle blasted a 48-ball half-century as the World XI reached 125 off only 16.1 overs. From then on however, they consistently lost wickets, due to insipid running between the wickets and a few soft dismissals, with Lara again hitting Nathan Bracken straight to Symonds at cover. The ICC World XI ended up being dismissed for 273, handing another victory to Australia.

Scorecard

=== Third ODI: Australia v ICC World XI (9 October) ===
9 October 2005 (D/N)
Scorecard

Australia; 293/5 (50 overs)	v	ICC World XI; 137 (27.5 overs)
Mike Hussey 75* (74); Muttiah Muralitharan (SL) 2/38 (10 overs)		Virender Sehwag (IND) 37 (40); Brett Lee 4/30 (9 overs)

Australia won by 156 runs
Telstra Dome, Melbourne
Umpires: Aleem Dar (Pak) and Darrell Hair (Aus)
Player of the match: Shane Watson (Aus)

- Australia won the toss and elected to bat.

=== Super Test: Australia v ICC World XI ===
14–17 October 2005 (6–day match)
Scorecard

Australia	v	ICC World XI
345 (90 overs); Matthew Hayden 111 (180); Andrew Flintoff 4/59 (18 overs)		190 (47.1 overs); Virender Sehwag 76 (82); Stuart MacGill 4/39 (9.1 overs)
199 (65.3 overs); Matthew Hayden 77 (120); Steve Harmison 3/41 (12.3 overs)		144 (50 overs); Jacques Kallis 39* (86); Stuart MacGill 5/43 (15 overs)

Australia won by 210 runs
Sydney Cricket Ground, Sydney, NSW
Umpires: Rudi Koertzen (SA) and Simon Taufel (Aus)
Player of the match: Matthew Hayden (Aus)

- Australia won the toss and elected to bat.
- The match was scheduled for six days but was completed in four days.

== Future ==
The original aim was that the Super Series would be played every four years. However, immediately after the completion of the first Test match, Malcolm Speed, the ICC Chief Executive, removed it from the regular ICC schedule, noting that it may be played in the future when there is a clear world champion.

== See also ==
- Rest of the World cricket team in England in 1970
- Rest of the World cricket team in Australia in 1971–72
- Test cricket
- List of World XI ODI cricketers
- List of World XI T20I cricketers

== Bibliography ==
- News about the ICC Super Series from Cricinfo
- Association of Cricket Statisticians and Historians Representation to the ICC
- Cricinfo bulletin on Victoria v World XI
- World XI Test squad
- Selection process
