= Zimbabwean cricket team in Australia in 2003–04 =

- Date: 28 September 2003 – 3 February 2004
- Location: Australia
- Result: Australia won the two-Test series 2–0
- Player of the series: Matthew Hayden
Teams
- Australia: Zimbabwe
Captains
- Steve Waugh: Heath Streak
Most runs
- Matthew Hayden (501) Ricky Ponting (259) Steve Waugh (139): Mark Vermeulen (166); Stuart Carlisle (160); Heath Streak (119)
Most wickets
- Andy Bichel (10) Simon Katich (6) Jason Gillespie (5): Ray Price (6); Sean Ervine (4); Andy Blignaut (3)

The Zimbabwean cricket team toured Australia in the 2003–04 season. On the tour, the Zimbabweans played two unclassified matches, one First-class match, three List A matches and two Tests, as well as taking part in the 2003–04 VB Series with Australia and India – who were touring Australia for four Tests at the same time. The Zimbabweans lost all but one international match – both Tests and seven of the eight One Day Internationals – the exception being called off for rain.

The tour was notable for Matthew Hayden's score of 380 in the first Test, this being the highest individual score in Test cricket at the time, beating Brian Lara's 375.

== Tour matches ==
=== Three-day: Zimbabweans v Rockingham-Mandurah Invitational XI ===
28–30 September
Scorecard

Zimbabweans	v	Rockingham-Mandurah XI
149 (69.4 overs); Sean Ervine 41 (84); Darren Wates 4/22 (16 overs)		123 (46.4 overs); Luke Ronchi 44 (47); Sean Ervine 5/37 (15 overs)
255/9d (108.1 overs); Craig Wishart 116 (235); John Taylor 3/34 (17 overs)		135/6 (34 overs); Luke Ronchi 47 (47); Ray Price 4/55 (12 overs)

Match drawn
Settlers Hill, Baldivis
Umpires: Andrew Craig (Aus) and D Foggarty (Aus)
Player of the match: Luke Ronchi (Rock'm-M'rah XI) and Craig Wishart (Zim)

- Rockingham-Mandurah Invitational XI won the toss and elected to field.
- This match did not have First-class status.

=== 50-over: Zimbabweans v Cricket Australia Chairman's XI ===
1 October
Scorecard

Cricket Australia Chairman's XI; 240 (49.5 overs)	v	Zimbabweans; 241/3 (41.2 overs)
Ryan Campbell 65 (79); Heath Streak 4/33 (9.5 overs)		Stuart Carlisle 89* (95); Brad Williams 1/32 (9 overs)

Zimbabwe won by 7 wickets
Lilac Hill Park, Perth
Umpires: Jeff Brookes (Aus) and Ian Lock (Aus)
Player of the match: Heath Streak (Zim)

- Cricket Australia Chairman's XI won the toss and elected to bat.
- This match did not have List A status.

=== First-class: Zimbabweans v Western Australia ===
3–5 October
(Scorecard)

Zimbabweans	v	Western Australia
330 (124.3 overs); Craig Wishart 100 (222); Paul Wilson 4/41 (30 overs)		207/6d (61 overs); Marcus North 59 (115); Heath Streak 3/35 (14 overs)
146/6d (49.4 overs); Trevor Gripper 54 (93); Paul Wilson 3/26 (14 overs)		266/4 (38 overs); Mike Hussey 79 (79); Trevor Gripper 2/57 (7 overs)

Match drawn
WACA Ground, Perth
Umpires: Bruce Bennett (Aus) and Ian Lock (Aus)

- Western Australia won the toss and elected to field.

=== List A: Zimbabweans v Australia A ===
1 January
Scorecard

Zimbabweans; 240 (49.5 overs)	v	Australia A 232 (49 overs)
Stuart Carlisle 100* (128); Dominic Thornely 3/38 (9.5 overs)		Shaun Marsh 57 (58); Sean Ervine 4/44 (10 overs)

Zimbabwe won by 8 runs
WACA Ground, Perth
Umpires: Bruce Oxenford (Aus) and Bob Parry (Aus)
Player of the match: Stuart Carlisle (Zim)

- Zimbabweans won the toss and elected to bat.

=== List A: Zimbabweans v Western Australia ===
4 January
Scorecard

Western Australia; 286/9 (50 overs)	v	Zimbabweans; 216 (44.1 overs)
Murray Goodwin 77 (83); Sean Ervine 5/56 (10 overs)		Mark Vermeulen 55 (35); Marcus North 2/5 (1.1 overs)

Western Australia won by 70 runs
WACA Ground, Perth
Umpires: Bruce Bennett (Aus) and Jeff Brookes (Aus)
Player of the match: Sean Ervine (Zim)

- Western Australia won the toss and elected to bat.

=== List A: Zimbabweans v Australia A ===
7 January
Scorecard

Australia A 327/6 (50 overs)	v	Zimbabweans; 208 (44 overs)
Marcus North 115 (109); Heath Streak 2/55 (10 overs)		Grant Flower 67 (85); Michael Clarke 2/16 (3 overs)

Australia A won by 119 runs
Adelaide Oval, Adelaide
Umpires: Ian Lock (Aus) and John Smeaton (Aus)
Player of the match: Marcus North (AusA)

- Australia A won the toss and elected to bat.

== Test series ==
=== 1st Test ===
9–13 October
Scorecard

Australia	v	Zimbabwe
735/6d (146.3 overs); Matthew Hayden 380 (437); Sean Ervine 4/146 (31 overs)		239 (89.3 overs); Trevor Gripper 53 (135); Brett Lee 3/48 (15 overs)
		321 (f/o) (127.2 overs); Heath Streak 71* (215); Andy Bichel 4/63 (28.2 overs)

Australia won by an innings and 175 runs
WACA Ground, Perth
Umpires: Venkat (Ind) and Peter Willey (Eng)
Player of the match: Matthew Hayden (Aus)

- Zimbabwe won the toss and elected to field.
- Matthew Hayden recorded the highest score ever in Test cricket, at the time, with his 380 in the first innings, surpassing the 375 set by Brian Lara in Antigua a decade earlier. Lara went on to reclaim the record less than six months later, however, with his 400 not out against England.

=== 2nd Test ===
17–21 October
Scorecard

Zimbabwe	v	Australia
308 (107.2 overs); Stuart Carlisle 118 (213); Andy Bichel 4/66 (24.2 overs)		403 (103.3 overs); Ricky Ponting 169 (249); Ray Price 6/121 (41.3 overs)
266 (91.5 overs); Mark Vermeulen 48 (70); Simon Katich 6/65 (25.5 overs)		172/1 (29.1 overs); Matthew Hayden 101* (85); Heath Streak 1/46 (9 overs)

Australia won by 9 wickets
Sydney Cricket Ground, Sydney
Umpires: Billy Bowden (NZ) and Venkat (Ind)
Player of the match: Ricky Ponting (Aus)

- Zimbabwe won the toss and elected to bat.
- Brad Williams (Aus) and Gavin Ewing (Zim) made their Test debuts.

=== Records ===
Australia's Matthew Hayden was named Man of the Series for his 501 runs over the two Tests and the historic triple-century. Comparatively, Mark Vermeulen scored the most runs for Zimbabwe with 166. Andy Bichel took the most wickets of the series with 10, with Ray Price taking six for Zimbabwe.

== See also ==
- Indian cricket team in Australia in 2003–04
- 2003–04 VB Series
