= 2003–04 Australia Tri-Series =

VB Series
- Part of the Zimbabwean cricket team in Australia in 2003–04 and the Indian cricket team in Australia in 2003–04
- Date: 9 January 2004 – 8 February 2004
- Location: Australia
- Result: Won by Australia
- Player of the series: Adam Gilchrist
Teams
Australia	India	Zimbabwe
Captains
Ricky Ponting	Sourav Ganguly	Heath Streak
Most runs
Gilchrist (498) Hayden (425)	VVS Laxman (443); Yuvraj Singh (314)	Ervine (265); Carlisle (223)
Most wickets
Williams (15) Lee (12)	Pathan (16); Balaji (13)	Streak (15); Ervine (12)

The 2003–04 VB-Series was a cricket tri-series involving touring nations India and Zimbabwe and hosts Australia. Australia won the tournament, who lost one match in the group stage, by defeating India in the 2-match final. Adam Gilchrist was named Man of the Series for his 498 runs at an average of 62.25.

== Group stage ==
=== Table ===
Pos	Team	P	W	L	NR/T	BP	CP	Points	NRR
1	Australia	8	6	1	1	3	1	37	+1.100
2	India	8	5	3	0	2	2	29	+0.282
3	Zimbabwe	8	0	7	1	0	3	6	−1.326

==== Key ====
- BP = Bonus points.

1 bonus point was awarded to the winning team if their run rate was 1.25x than that of the losing team.

- CP = Consolation points

1 consolation point was awarded to the losing team if they denied the winning team from receiving the bonus point.

==== Points system ====
- Won = 5 points
- Lost = 0 points
- Tie or No result = 3 points
- Standard net run rate rules applied.

==== Position deciders ====
The deciding factors, in order, on table position were:

1. Total points
2. Games won
3. Head-to-head result
4. Bonus points
5. Net run rate

=== Matches ===
==== Match 1: Australia v India ====
9 January
14:15 (D/N)
(scorecard)

Australia; 288 (48.3 overs)	v	India; 270 (49 overs)
Andrew Symonds 88 (102); Michael Clarke 63 (66); Ajit Agarkar 6/42 (9.3 overs)		Sourav Ganguly 82 (83); Sachin Tendulkar 63 (69); Ian Harvey 3/52 (10 overs)

Australia won by 18 runs
Melbourne Cricket Ground, Melbourne
Attendance: 63,271
Umpires: Steve Bucknor (WIN) and Simon Taufel (AUS)
Player of the match: Andrew Symonds

Ajit Agarkar recorded his first 5 wicket haul, and his best career ODI figures to date.

==== Match 2: Australia v Zimbabwe ====
11 January
14:15 (D/N)
(scorecard)

Australia; 225/8 (50 overs)	v	Zimbabwe; 126 (37.3 overs)
Andrew Symonds 42 (82); Sean Ervine 3/53 (10 overs)		Heath Streak 46 (92); Brad Williams 5/22 (8.3 overs)

Australia won by 99 runs
Sydney Cricket Ground, Sydney
Attendance: 20,538
Umpires: Rudi Koertzen (RSA) and Simon Taufel (AUS)
Player of the match: Brad Williams

Brad Williams took his second 5 wicket haul, and recorded his best bowling figures with his 5/22.

==== Match 3: India v Zimbabwe ====
14 January
10:00
(scorecard)

Zimbabwe; 208/6 (50 overs)	v	India; 211/3 (37.4 overs)
Heath Streak 59* (68); Virender Sehwag 2/40 (10 overs)		Virender Sehwag 90 (102); Douglas Hondo 1/39 (8 overs)

India won by 7 wickets
Bellerive Oval, Hobart
Attendance: 3,109
Umpires: Steve Bucknor (WIN) and Peter Parker (AUS)
Player of the match: Virender Sehwag

==== Match 4: Australia v Zimbabwe ====
16 January
10:00
(scorecard)

Australia; 344/7 (50 overs)	v	Zimbabwe; 196/6 (50 overs)
Adam Gilchrist 172 (126); Matthew Hayden 63 (75); Heath Streak 3/50 (10 overs)		Heath Streak 64* (82); Brett Lee 1/29 (10 overs)

Australia won by 148 runs
Bellerive Oval, Hobart Attendance: 12,715
Umpires: Steve Davis (AUS) and Rudi Koertzen (RSA)
Player of the match: Adam Gilchrist

Gilchrist's 172 is his personal highest score in both One Day Internationals and List A cricket. It was also the highest score by a wicket-keeper in ODI cricket until Mahendra Singh Dhoni's 183* in 2005.

==== Match 5: Australia v India ====
18 January
13:15 (D/N)
(scorecard)

India; 303/4 (50 overs)	v	Australia; 284 (49.4 overs)
VVS Laxman 103* (113); Sachin Tendulkar 86 (95); Rahul Dravid 74 (64); Brad Williams 1/40 (8 overs)		Matthew Hayden 109 (107); Lakshmipathy Balaji 4/48 (10 overs); Irfan Pathan 3/64 (9.4 overs)

India won by 19 runs
The Gabba, Woolloongabba
Attendance: 35,052
Umpires: Steve Bucknor (WIN) and Peter Parker (AUS)
Player of the match: VVS Laxman

==== Match 6: India v Zimbabwe ====
20 January
13:15 (D/N)
(scorecard)

India; 255/6 (50 overs)	v	Zimbabwe; 231 (47.1 overs)
Rahul Dravid 84 (106); Yuvraj Singh 69 (76); Sean Ervine 3/47 (10 overs)		Sean Ervine 39 (27); Sourav Ganguly 3/55 (10 overs)

India won by 24 runs
The Gabba, Woolloongabba
Attendance: 9,638
Umpires: Steve Davis (AUS) and Rudi Koertzen (RSA)
Player of the match: Yuvraj Singh

==== Match 7: Australia v India ====
22 January
14:15 (D/N)
(scorecard)

India; 296/4 (50 overs)	v	Australia; 225/8 (33.5 overs)
Yuvraj Singh 139 (122); VVS Laxman 106* (130); Brett Lee 2/46 (9 overs)		Adam Gilchrist 95 (72); Sourav Ganguly 3/41 (7 overs); Irfan Pathan 3/51 (7 overs)

Australia won by 2 wickets (DL)
Sydney Cricket Ground, Sydney
Attendance: 39,088
Umpires: Steve Bucknor (WIN) and Daryl Harper (AUS)
Player of the match: Yuvraj Singh

- Match shortened due to rain; Duckworth-Lewis revised target to win: 225 runs in 34 overs for Australia.

==== Match 8: India v Zimbabwe ====
24 January
13:45 (D/N)
(scorecard)

India; 280/7 (50 overs)	v	Zimbabwe; 277/6 (50 overs)
VVS Laxman 131 (138); Rahul Dravid 56 (72); Rohan Gavaskar 54 (62); Heath Streak 3/53 (10 overs)		Stuart Carlisle 109 (128); Sean Ervine 100 (100); Ajit Agarkar 3/39 (10 overs)

India won by 3 runs
Adelaide Oval, Adelaide
Attendance: 8,680
Umpires: Daryl Harper (AUS) and Rudi Koertzen (RSA)
Player of the match: VVS Laxman

==== Match 9: Australia v Zimbabwe ====
26 January
13:45 (D/N)
(scorecard)

Australia; 279/7 (50 overs)	v	Zimbabwe; 266/8 (50 overs)
Michael Bevan 75 (91); Ricky Ponting 63 (71); Heath Streak 3/45 (10 overs)		Grant Flower 94 (106); Brad Williams 2/38 (8 overs)

Australia won by 13 runs
Adelaide Oval, Adelaide
Attendance: 27,612
Umpires: Steve Bucknor (WIN) and Steve Davis (AUS)
Player of the match: Grant Flower

==== Match 10: Australia v Zimbabwe ====
29 January
14:15 (D/N)
(scorecard)

Australia; 263/9 (50 overs)	v	Zimbabwe
Michael Bevan 56 (56); Heath Streak 2/47 (10 overs)

No result
Melbourne Cricket Ground, Melbourne
Attendance: 15,218
Umpires: Rudi Koertzen (RSA) and Peter Parker (AUS)

- Match abandoned due to rain.

==== Match 11: Australia v India ====
1 February
10:30
(scorecard)

India; 203 (49 overs)	v	Australia; 204/5 (32 overs)
Yuvraj Singh 47 (62); Brett Lee 3/22 (10 overs)		Adam Gilchrist 75 (65); Andrew Symonds 73 (57); Ajit Agarkar 2/56 (9 overs)

Australia won by 5 wickets
WACA Ground, Perth
Attendance: 18,858
Umpires: Steve Bucknor (WIN) and Daryl Harper (AUS)
Player of the match: Adam Gilchrist

- Michael Hussey (Aus) made his ODI debut.

==== Match 12: India v Zimbabwe ====
3 February
12:30 (D/N)
(scorecard)

Zimbabwe; 135 (34.4 overs)	v	India; 136/6 (30.3 overs)
Stuart Matsikenyeri 36 (46); Irfan Pathan 4/24 (10 overs); Amit Bhandari 3/31 (7.4 overs)		Hemang Badani 34 (59); Sean Ervine 2/29 (8.3 overs)

India won by 4 wickets
WACA Ground, Perth
Attendance: 4,053
Umpires: Rudi Koertzen (RSA) and Simon Taufel (AUS)
Player of the match: Irfan Pathan

== Final series ==
=== First final ===
6 February
14:15 (D/N)
Scorecard

India; 222 (49 overs)	v	Australia; 224/3 (40.1 overs)
Hemang Badani 60* (81); Brett Lee 2/34 (9 overs)		Ricky Ponting 88 (80); Lakshmipathy Balaji 3/52 (10 overs)

Australia won by 7 wickets
Melbourne Cricket Ground, Melbourne
Attendance: 44,737
Umpires: Steve Bucknor (Win) and Simon Taufel (Aus)
Player of the match: Ricky Ponting (Aus)

- India won the toss and elected to bat.

=== Second final ===
8 February
14:15 (D/N)
Scorecard

Australia; 359/5 (50 overs)	v	India; 151 (33.2 overs)
Matthew Hayden 126 (122); Ashish Nehra 2/63 (10 overs)		Irfan Pathan 30 (41); Brad Williams 2/12 (6.2 overs)

Australia won by 208 runs
Sydney Cricket Ground, Sydney
Attendance: 39,760
Umpires: Daryl Harper (AUS) and Rudi Koertzen (RSA)
Player of the match: Matthew Hayden (Aus)

- Australia won the toss and elected to bat.

== Gallery ==
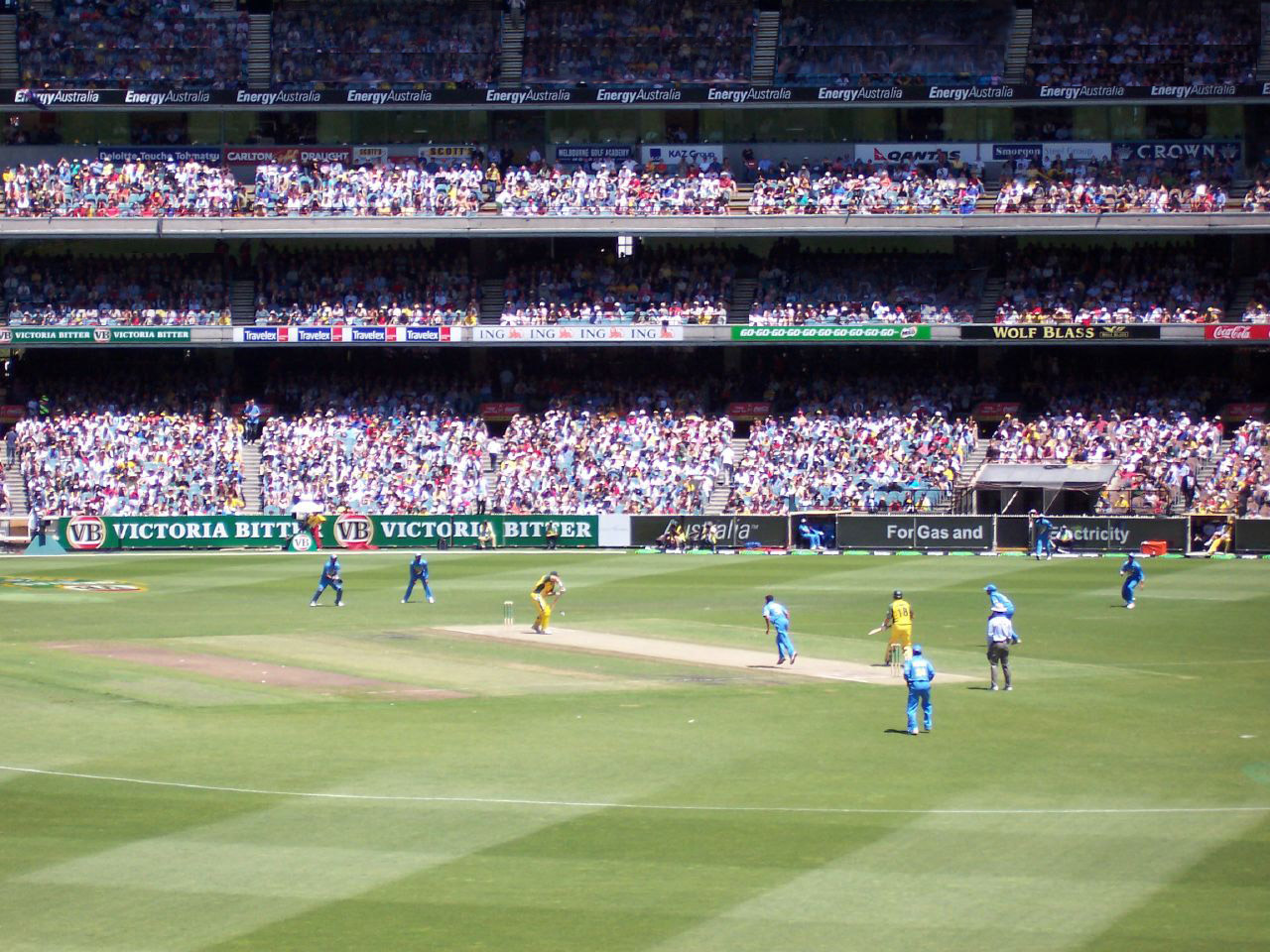
Match 1 at the MCG

== See also ==
- Indian cricket team in Australia in 2003–04
- Zimbabwean cricket team in Australia in 2003–04
