= Mark Vermeulen =

Zimbabwean cricketer

Personal information
- Full name: Mark Andrew Vermeulen
- Born: 2 March 1979 (age 47); Salisbury, Rhodesia
- Height: 6 ft 4 in (1.93 m)
- Batting: Right-handed
- Bowling: Right-arm off break
- Role: Batsman

International information
- National side: Zimbabwe (2000–2014)
- Test debut (cap 56): 16 November 2002 v Pakistan
- Last Test: 9 August 2014 v South Africa
- ODI debut (cap 61): 21 October 2000 v Sri Lanka
- Last ODI: 8 November 2009 v South Africa

Domestic team information
- Years: Team
- 1999/00–2004/05: Matabeleland
- 2008/09: Westerns
- 2009/10: Matabeleland Tuskers
- 2010/11: Mountaineers
- 2011/12: Southern Rocks
- 2012/13: Mid West Rhinos
- 2013/14: Mashonaland Eagles

Career statistics
Competition	Test	ODI	FC	LA
Matches	9	43	103	108
Runs scored	449	868	6,744	2,435
Batting average	24.94	22.25	37.88	24.35
100s/50s	1/2	0/6	16/28	1/15
Top score	118	92	198	105
Balls bowled	6	5	923	71
Wickets	0	1	15	1
Bowling average	–	5.00	32.86	66.00
5 wickets in innings	–	0	0	0
10 wickets in match	–	0	0	0
Best bowling	–	1/5	3/26	1/5
Catches/stumpings	6/–	18/–	114/–	33/–
- Source: CricketArchive, 1 October 2017

Mark Andrew Vermeulen (born 2 March 1979) is a former Zimbabwean cricketer, who played Test matches and One Day Internationals. He is a right-handed opening batsman and occasional off spin bowler.

== Domestic career ==
He was a former captain of the Zimbabwe Under-19 team. He averaged 43.60 in the 2004/2005 domestic cricket season.

He spent time at the Matabeleland Tuskers, Mid West Rhinos, Mountaineers and Southern Rocks and completed a full house of playing for all the teams in the country when he returned to the Mash Eagles in his home-town of Harare. The domestic season was stalled by a player strike but once it got underway, Vermeulen resumed playing. He was the second-highest run scorer in the Logan Cup with 580 runs in seven matches at an average of 64.44.

He was selected for the Zimbabwe A tour of Namibia in February 2009.

== International career ==
He was first drafted into the Zimbabwe squad for the second Test against Pakistan in November 2002 replacingGuy Whittall.

He played three matches in the 2003 World Cup. He was struck on the head by a ball bowled by Irfan Pathan during Zimbabwe's VB Series campaign in Australia in 2004. In 2009, Vermeulen made a brief comeback for ODIs against South Africa but then disappeared from international cricket while he made his way around Zimbabwe's domestic circuit.

On the 2003–04 tour of Australia, Vermeulen fractured his skull during a One-Day International match against India. This was the second time this had happened to him inside a year, after an identical injury occurred in February 2003 while practising. Successful surgery has limited the impact that these injuries have had on Vermeulen's cricketing career.

Although he had a side career in golf, Vermeulen decided to make the 2013–14 season his final go at trying to be an international cricketer. In July 2014, he was picked for the Zimbabwe A side to play Afghanistan. He scored a century in the first four-day match and also played a one-off Test against South Africa which followed. Brendan Taylor described him as calm, for a change.

A decade after last playing in whites for Zimbabwe, Vermeulen made a comeback in August 2014. In July 2009, he was called up to the Zimbabwe squad for the One Day International Series against Bangladesh. In the first match of the series, played at Queens Sports Club, Bulawayo, Vermeulen scored 92 in Zimbabwe's score of 207, before being run out.

== Disciplinary problems ==
He has had a number of disciplinary problems. He was sent home from Zimbabwe's tour of England in 2003 after ignoring management instructions to travel with the rest of the squad. Then in 2006 he was banned from all cricket played under the auspices of the England and Wales Cricket Board after a violent altercation with spectators at a match between Ashton and his club, Werneth in the Central Lancashire League. The original ban imposed was ten years, but on appeal it was reduced to three years, two of which were suspended. The ban took effect from 1 April 2007.

In November 2006, Vermeulen was held by police after apparently fleeing the scene of a suspicious fire at the Zimbabwean Cricket Academy in Harare. A fire had also been set at the Zimbabwe Cricket headquarters. ZCU Managing Director Ozias Bvute confirmed that Vermeulen was being held "for questioning" in the incident. Vermeulen was formally charged with arson in the incident on 2 November. In January 2008, he was cleared on grounds of mental illness, and in February announced that he was hoping to make a comeback.

In May 2008, Vermeulen offered to help rebuild the academy he burnt by using a percentage of his earnings that he would get by playing for Zimbabwe again.

In October 2015, Vermeulen was banned from all cricket by Zimbabwe Cricket after posting racist comments on social media, where he compared black Zimbabweans to apes.

== Style ==
Along with being a batsman, he fileded in the slips, and was an occasional offbreak bowler.
