= Irfan Pathan =

Indian former cricketer (born 1984)

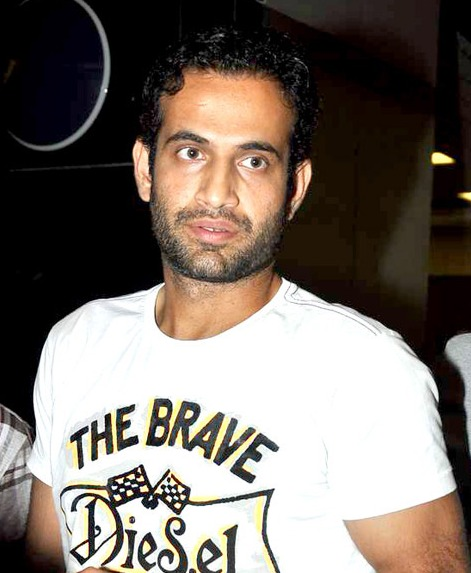
- Pathan in 2013

Personal information
- Full name: Irfan Khan Pathan
- Born: 27 October 1984 (age 42); Baroda, Gujarat, India
- Batting: Left-handed
- Bowling: Left-arm medium-fast
- Role: All rounder
- Relatives: Yusuf Pathan (brother)

International information
- National side: India (2003–2012)
- Test debut (cap 248): 12 December 2003 v Australia
- Last Test: 5 April 2008 v South Africa
- ODI debut (cap 153): 9 January 2004 v Australia
- Last ODI: 4 August 2012 v Sri Lanka
- ODI shirt no.: 56
- T20I debut (cap 7): 1 December 2006 v South Africa
- Last T20I: 2 October 2012 v South Africa
- T20I shirt no.: 56

Domestic team information
- Years: Team
- 2000–2017: Baroda
- 2005: Middlesex
- 2008–2010: Kings XI Punjab
- 2011–2013: Delhi Daredevils
- 2014: Sunrisers Hyderabad
- 2016: Rising Pune Supergiants
- 2017: Gujarat Lions
- 2020: Kandy Tuskers

Career statistics
Competition	Test	ODI	T20I	FC
Matches	29	120	24	122
Runs scored	1,305	1,544	172	4,559
Batting average	33.89	23.39	24.57	30.39
100s/50s	1/7	0/5	0/0	3/26
Top score	102	83	33*	121
Balls bowled	5,884	5,855	462	21,034
Wickets	100	173	28	384
Bowling average	32.26	29.72	22.07	28.33
5 wickets in innings	7	2	0	19
10 wickets in match	2	0	0	3
Best bowling	7/59	5/27	3/16	7/35
Catches/stumpings	8/–	21/–	2/–	30/–
Medal record
Men's cricket
Representing India
ICC T20 World Cup
Winner	2007 South Africa
ICC Champions Trophy
Winner	2013 England & Wales
ACC Asia Cup
Runner-up	2004 Sri Lanka
Runner-up	2008 Pakistan
ACC U19 Asia Cup
Winner	2003 Pakistan
- Source: ESPNcricinfo, 27 October 2025

Irfan Pathan (born 27 October 1984) is an Indian cricket commentator, analyst and former player. He was a bowling all-rounder and member of the Indian cricket team that won the inaugural 2007 ICC Twenty20 World Cup and 2013 ICC Champions Trophy.

Beginning his career as a fast-medium swing and seam bowler, Pathan broke into the national team soon after turning 19, and evoked comparisons with Pakistan's Wasim Akram with his promising performances and prodigious swing. In early 2006, Pathan became the only bowler to take a Test hat-trick in the first over of the match (vs Pakistan at Karachi). However, the productive run did not last and after the start of 2006, Pathan began to steadily lose pace and swing, and his wicket-taking dwindled. Although Pathan's batting continued to be productive, he was not regarded as a specialist and was dropped from the team in both Tests and ODIs by the end of 2006, and by 2007 was no longer in the squad until his return in the 2007 World Twenty20.

He cemented his position in the team and was named by the International Cricket Council as the 2004 ICC Men's Emerging Player of the Year. Pathan was instrumental in India's ODI and Test series wins in Pakistan in 2004. He was described by the media as the "blue-eyed boy" of Indian cricket. In late-2004 he took 18 wickets in two Tests against Bangladesh, but the start of 2005 he performed poorly and conceded runs at a high rate, leading to a brief exile from the ODI team.

Immediately thereafter, Australian Greg Chappell, one of the leading batsmen of his time, became India's coach (2005) and identified Pathan's batting potential. Pathan improved his batting skills and tried to become a complete bowling all-rounder, and he opened the batting on occasions in ODIs and scored 93 in a Test match (10 Dec 2005, versus Sri Lanka in Delhi) in the role after an illness to Virender Sehwag. He made three scores beyond 80 in the space of four Test innings against Sri Lanka and Pakistan. For the first nine months of Chappell's stint at the helm, Pathan performed strongly with both bat and ball, scoring runs regularly and frequently taking top-order wickets. He rose to No. 2 in the ICC's ODI rankings for all-rounders and was also in the top five in the Test rankings. This led critics to compare him to former Indian pace bowling allrounder Kapil Dev.

He returned to international cricket in September 2007 for the inaugural World Twenty20, where he took three wickets and was man of the match as India beat Pakistan in the final. Pathan became the first Indian bowler on T20 World Cup debut who picked up a wicket on the first ball. This earned him a recall into the ODI team, where he was a regular for most of the next 12 months before being dropped as his economy rate continued to trend upwards and subsequently struggled with a loss of form and injuries. In late-2007 Pathan was also recalled into the Test team after 19 months and hit his maiden Test century, but could not maintain his place in the team as his bowling was not effective enough with only two pacemen needed. Pathan played his last Test for India in April 2008 against South Africa. He continued to perform with both bat and ball at the domestic level, although his sedate pace was frequently criticized as being irrelevant at the international level. However, he impressed during the 2011–12 Ranji Trophy, where he was the leading wicket-taker, and his performances earned him a recall to the national team again.

He was a contestant in the dance reality show Jhalak Dikhhla Jaa in 2015. Irfan Pathan made his acting debut in the 2022 Indian film Cobra.

== Background and personal life ==
Pathan was born 27 October 1984 in Baroda, Gujarat, India and is of Pashtun (Pathan) ancestry, belonging to the Pathan community in Gujarat. He grew up with his elder brother Yusuf in a mosque in Vadodara, in an impoverished family. His father served as the muezzin. Although their parents wished them to become Islamic scholars, Pathan and his brother took an interest in cricket. In the beginning his deliveries did not reach the other end of the cricket pitch, but rigorous six-hour training sessions in blazing heat and his family's sense of discipline saw him progress steadily.

Pathan had a 10-year long relationship with Australia-based Shivangi Dev. She wanted to marry him but since Irfan wished his older brother Yusuf to get married prior, differences began to grow between the two and they broke up in 2012. He married a Jeddah-based model, Safa Baig, on 4 February 2016, in Mecca. They have two sons.

== Early career ==
Under the guidance of former Indian captain Datta Gaekwad, Pathan rose to get selected in the Under-14 Baroda cricket team, and when he was selected at Under-15 level to represent Baroda in a national tournament, he was finally presented with a full set of cricket equipment, having before been restricted to second-hand gear due to his family's limited economic means.

In December 1997, Pathan broke into the Baroda Under-16 team, less than two months after turning 13. He took a total of 1/35 and scored 1 and 11 against Gujarat and was dropped immediately afterwards. He did not play again for the Under-16s for two years, and in November 1999, less than a month after turning 15, he made his next appearance, this time for Baroda Under-19s against Maharashtra. He scored 61 and 9 and took a total of 3/41 in a victory, but was immediately dropped back to the Under-16s for the next match, and spent the rest of the 1999–2000 season there. He bowled short spells in the younger division, taking four wickets at 38.00 in six matches, averaging less than seven overs an innings. He had more success with the bat, scoring 253 runs at 31.62 including a best of 72 against Mumbai.

Pathan was then selected for the India Under-15 team in mid-2000 to play a series of matches against their colleagues from other countries. He took 15 wickets at 12.66 in ten matches, including a best of 3/2 against Thailand, and scored 15 runs at 7.50. India won all but one of the matches, most by enormous margins.

== Youth career ==
At the start of the 2000–01 season, Pathan was immediately back in the Under-19s, this time bowling more, often delivering more than 20 overs per innings. In four matches, he scored 102 runs at 102.00 including a best of 63 not out, and took 10 wickets at 32.50. He was then promoted to the Under-22s, where he scored 44 and took 4/71 in his first match against Saurashtra, prompting the Baroda selectors to propel him into the senior team.

In 2003–04, he was then selected for India Emerging Players for a series of limited-overs matches against counterparts from Pakistan and Sri Lanka. Pathan took seven wickets at 11.00 in three matches, including 4/22 and 3/35 in two matches against Pakistan.

In late 2003, he was selected for the India Under-19 team to compete in an Asian youth ODI competition in Pakistan, where he was the leading bowler with 18 wickets at 7.38, with an economy rate of 3.54. This was more than twice that of the second leading wicket-taker. He was named as the player of the tournament, which India won after defeating Sri Lanka by eight wickets in the final. Pathan was featured on the headlines when he claimed 9/16 against Bangladesh, helping to bowl them out for 34, and helped India to emerge victorious over Sri Lanka in the final, taking 3/33. Pathan also scored 94 runs at 31.33 with the bat, compiling scores of 32, 28 and 34. Pathan returned to India and took 3/51 and 1/33 and scored 26 and 12 in his first Ranji Trophy match for the season, against Andhra Pradesh. This resulted in him being selected for the Indian national squad for the 2003–04 Border-Gavaskar Trophy Test series in Australia.

== Domestic career ==
He started against Bengal in March 2001, after fellow left-arm paceman Zaheer Khan was selected for the national team. He scored 13 not out and 2, and took 3/40 and 2/68 in a 222-run win. However, he was unable to repeat this form in the three remaining matches, taking only two more wickets in total, but Baroda nevertheless managed to win the Ranji Trophy. He ended his maiden season with seven wickets at 43.28 and 75 runs at 12.50 with a best score of 40 not out against Orissa.

The Ranji win saw Baroda qualify for the following season's Irani Trophy where they took on the Rest of India. Pathan scored 32 in the second innings and took 3/95 and 1/34 in a defeat, but his performance reminded Test batsman V. V. S. Laxman of Zaheer. However, he was omitted from the senior team and sent back to the Under-19s the next week and stayed there for the next two months, playing eight double-innings matches for Baroda. He took 20 wickets at 20.40, including a best of 6/41 against Gujarat, and scoring 190 runs at 31.66 with a best of 63 not out. Pathan was then recalled to the senior team and made his List A debut against Mumbai, taking 1/69 from nine overs. Pathan further honed his bowling at the MRF Pace Foundation in Chennai, after being referred by Indian selector Kiran More.

In early 2002, he was selected for the Under-19 Cricket World Cup in New Zealand, where he took six wickets at 27.50 and scored 30 runs at 15.00, taking 2/18 in a win over South Africa.

Upon returning to India, Pathan was selected in a senior zonal team for the first time. He was selected for West Zone for the Duleep Trophy, even though he had not played a single match for Baroda in the Ranji Trophy season. He immediately repaid the selectors' faith by taking 4/74 and 6/72, his first ten-wicket match haul, in the first fixture against Central Zone, setting up a 161-run win. In the next match, he took 4/72 and 3/85 as West defeated North by 178 runs. He only took 1/55 in the next match against South but West were through to the final, where he took 4/43 to help cut down East Zone for 162 in the first innings, sealing the title. In all Pathan, had taken 22 wickets at 18.22 for the tournament, and scored 46 runs at 11.50.

These performances propelled Pathan into the India A team at the age of 17 and a half, for a tour of Sri Lanka, where he took six wickets at 35.00 in three first-class matches. Pathan then went on an India Under-19 tour of England in mid-2002. He took 15 wickets at 25.93 in the three youth Tests, which India lost 1–0, with a best of 4/83 in the Second Test. He then took four wickets at 42.00, conceding more than six runs an over, and scored 66 runs at 33.00 in the three youth ODIs, which India won 2–1.

Pathan was rewarded with selection in the Rest of India team that played against Railways in the Irani Trophy at the start of the 2002–03 season. He took a total of 2/84 and scored 29 as the Ranji champions prevailed. He struggled in the Ranji Trophy, taking 18 wickets at 39.33 in seven matches. Half of his wickets came in one match against Orissa in which he claimed 6/31 and 3/46 in an innings victory. He scored 161 runs at 23.00, with a 54 against Tamil Nadu being his maiden first-class fifty, as well as two other forties. Despite a lack of wickets for Baroda, Pathan was selected for the Duleep Trophy, playing for Elite Group A. He took 5/88 and 4/106 against Plate Group A and 4/101 against Elite Group C, before taking 3/53 and 2/42 as Elite Group A defeated Elite Group B in the final by seven wickets. Pathan ended the tournament with 19 wickets at 27.00 and scored 72 runs at 24.00. In the one-dayers, Pathan also struggled for Baroda, taking three wickets at 64.66 in four matches at an economy rate of 4.85, but he was nevertheless selected for the zonal team, where he took four wickets at 34.25 in four matches at an economy rate of 3.91.

In 2003 he was selected for the India A team which travelled to England. Playing in five first-class matches, Pathan took nine wickets at 43.77, including 4/60 against Yorkshire and 3/83 against South Africa. He managed only 8 runs at 4.00 with the bat. He had more success in the limited-overs matches, taking eight wickets at 11.12 in three matches, including a 4/19 against Lancashire, and scoring 27 runs at 27.00.

At the start of the 2003–04 season, Pathan played in the domestic Challenger Trophy for the first time. Representing India A, he had little success, taking two wickets at 79.00 at an economy rate of 5.85, and he did not force his way into India's limited-overs team.

In 2022, Bhilwara Kings selected him in the Legends League Cricket and gave him the captaincy and retained him for the 2023 season as well.

== International career ==
=== Early years (2003–2005) ===
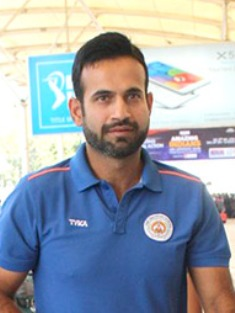
Pathan made his Test debut in December 2003, following an injury to the Baroda left-armer Zaheer Khan

Pathan made his Test debut in the Second Test against Australia at the Adelaide Oval in December 2003. At the age of 19, he opened the bowling following an injury to the Baroda left-armer Zaheer Khan in the First Test. In a high scoring match, he took the wicket of Matthew Hayden while giving away 160 runs at almost five runs an over. He scored one in his only innings as India took a four-wicket victory. He was dropped for the following Test upon the return of Zaheer, but was recalled for the Fourth Test at the Sydney Cricket Ground after Zaheer broke down in his only spell in the Third Test. On another flat pitch, Pathan took the wickets of Steve Waugh, Adam Gilchrist in the first innings in a spell of reverse swing bowling. He had Waugh caught behind from an outswinger and then bowled Gilchrist with an inswinging yorker. He ended with 2/80 in the first innings and dismissed Ricky Ponting in the second innings to end with match figures of 3/106.

In the ODI tri-nation tournament against Australia and Zimbabwe that followed, Pathan was the leading wicket-taker with 16 wickets at an average of 31 in his maiden ODI series. After ending with 0/61 from ten overs on debut against Australia, he bounced back to take 3/64 and 3/51 in the next two matches against the World Cup holders. He earned his first international man of the match award in the tournament, after taking 4/24 against Zimbabwe at the WACA Ground in Perth in his eighth ODI. However, his tour ended on a bad note after he was reprimanded by match referees for mocking the Australian batsman Damien Martyn after his dismissal in the second final. In that match, he took 2/75 as Australia amassed 5/359 and crushed India by 208 runs. Pathan made 30 in the match as his team folded for only 151. His batting improved towards the end of the tour with three scores of at least 19 in his last four innings, and he ended with 86 runs at 17.20 for the tournament.

Pathan subsequently led the pace attack again on the 2004 Test tour to Pakistan, taking 12 wickets and bowling a higher proportion of maiden overs than any other bowler to help secure India's first series victory over Pakistan in two decades. In the first innings, he bowled 28 overs and took 4/100 to help India restrict their arch-rivals to 407 and take a 268-run lead. After stand-in captain Rahul Dravid enforced the follow on, Pathan tied the Pakistanis down, bowling 12 maidens in his 21 overs to end with 2/26 as India secured an innings win. Pathan then scored 49 in the Second Test in Lahore after a batting collapse of the top order, helping India to recover to 287. However this was not enough as Pakistan reached 489 despite Pathan bowling 44 overs to take 3/107, and the hosts went on to complete a nine-wicket win. In the deciding Test in Rawalpindi, Pathan took 2/49 and 1/35 in an innings win. He ended the series with 12 wickets at 28.50 and 64 runs at 21.33.

=== Golden form ===
He also continued his prolific wicket-taking in the ODIs, taking eight wickets at 17.87 at an economy rate of 4.76 in three matches, including three top-order wickets in the deciding fifth ODI in Lahore. He also scored 36 runs at 36.00 in the ODIs. His ability to swing the ball both ways and his innings in Lahore led to speculation that he could become an all rounder. In recognition of his performances at the start of his international career, Pathan was named the ICC Emerging Player of the Year in 2004.

Pathan continued his productive form in ODIs at the 2004 Asian Cup in Sri Lanka, where he was the leading wicket-taker with 14 wickets at 16.28 at an economy rate of 4.37 in six matches, with three three-wicket hauls against the United Arab Emirates, Bangladesh and Pakistan respectively. He also scored 64 runs at 32.00 including a 38 in a defeat against Pakistan.

=== Struggle in form ===
He then struggled during an ODI tour in Europe, taking three wickets at 78.00 at an economy rate of 5.48 from five matches. India won only one of these games and lost four. Pathan returned to form during India's brief campaign at the 2004 ICC Champions Trophy in England, where he claimed 5 wickets at an average of 9.00 and economy rate of 3.00. He took 2/11 against Kenya and 3/34 against Pakistan, but defeat at the hands of the latter ended India's campaign.

Returning to India, Pathan then represented his country at the highest level for the first time on home soil. Pathan continued to improve his batting with a defiant 31 and 55 against Australia in October 2004 in the First Test in Bangalore. This was his first half-century in Tests, and was scored after the specialist batsmen had failed. Nevertheless, he managed a total of only 2/100 and India fell to a 217-run loss. Pathan's career was put on hold after he suffered a side strain in the following Test in Chennai, in which he totalled 0/68, causing him to miss the Tests in Nagpur and Mumbai. Australia went on to take the series 2–1 and Pathan ended with two wickets at 84.00 and 100 runs at 33.33. After being overlooked for the First Test with selectors opting for three spinners, he returned in the Second Test against South Africa in Kolkata, aggregating 3/89 and scoring 24 in an eight-wicket win that sealed a 1–0 series win.

=== Success in return ===
Pathan made his name in Tests on the December tour to Bangladesh. Swinging the ball both ways, Pathan took 5/45 and 6/51 including several LBW decisions in the First Test in Dhaka to claim his first ten-wicket haul and his first Test man of the match award as India claimed a commanding innings victory. He followed this with a match haul of 7/118 in the following match in Chittagong to take 18 wickets at 11.88 to be named as man of the series. India swept the series, winning both matches by an innings. Although the Indian batsmen scored heavily, Pathan managed only five and four. He played in only one of the three ODIs against the hosts as India rotated their players, taking 1/45 and scoring 21 not out in an 11-run win.

In late 2004, the Board of Control for Cricket in India introduced central contracts for international players for the first time, and Pathan was given a B-grade contract. 2005 began rather poorly for Pathan. He took only six wickets at 68.33 in the home Test series against Pakistan after losing pace and accuracy. In the last two matches, he managed totals of 2/122 and 1/160, conceding more than four runs an over as the Pakistani batsmen scored heavily. He scored 64 runs at 16.00 and made a duck in the second innings of the Third Test as the hosts collapsed on the last day to squander the series 1–1.

=== Ups and downs ===
He was subsequently dropped for the ODI series, playing in only one match in which he conceded 67 runs without picking up a wicket in 8 overs. However, he did manage to post his first ODI half-century, scoring 64, defiantly holding up his end as India were bowled out for 213, sealing a 106-run loss. Greg Chappell became the coach of the Indian team following the Pakistan series and identified Pathan as a potential all-rounder. He started to hone Pathan's batting skills, which had up to this point yielded 275 Test runs at 19.64. Pathan was subsequently signed by Middlesex County Cricket Club for the English country season, where he attempted to regain his form after his bad start to the year. Pathan arrived in late-May and stayed for six weeks. He achieved better results than in the Pakistan series, taking six wickets at 24.66 and an economy rate of 5.41 in four one-dayers, including 3/42 against Essex. In the new Twenty20 format, Pathan took 12 wickets at 12.75 and an economy rate of 6.37 in seven matches, including a best of 4/27 against Essex. He scored 21 not out in the same match to help seal a 31-run win. However, his difficulties in first-class matches continued. He took 4/81 and 1/68, and scored 41 and 13 not out in a productive debut against Sussex, and Middlesex were only one wicket away from victory when time ran out. However, he failed to take another wicket and ended with five wickets at 64.80 and 126 runs at 63.00, scoring 68 against Surrey.

Pathan was recalled to the ODI team for the 2005 Indian Oil Cup in Sri Lanka in August. This was Chappell's first series as a coach, in which Pathan played in all five matches and took 6 wickets at 33.83 at an economy rate of 4.41, but conceded 0/59 from nine overs as the hosts won the final. He scored 58 runs at 29.00 including an unbeaten 36 after India's batting collapsed in a loss to the hosts in a preliminary match.

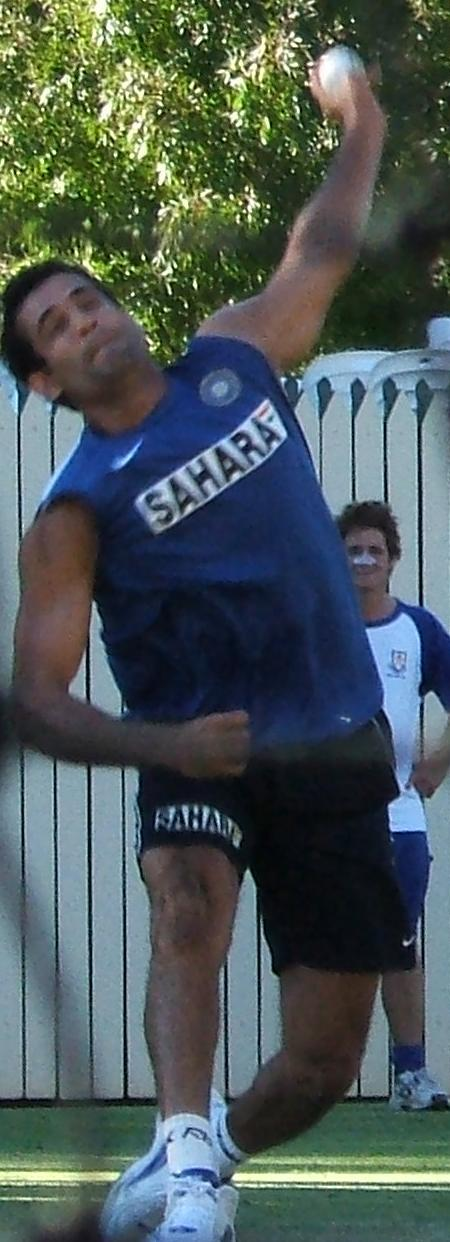
Pathan bowling in the nets.

=== Making history ===
He showed further signs of returning to peak form in the Videocon Triangular Series in Zimbabwe, taking 10 wickets at 16.10 at an economy rate of 5.03 and scored 60 runs at 30.00 in four matches. This included a haul of 3/34 and then a score of 50 as India collapsed to 164 all out and a 51-run loss to New Zealand. In another match, he took his ODI career best of 5/27 against Zimbabwe in Harare as the hosts fell for 65. Despite his overall good form, Pathan was punished by the New Zealanders in the final, conceding 40 runs in five wicketless overs as India lost their second successive final. He was subsequently the leading wicket-taker as India took a 2–0 clean sweep of an away Test series against Zimbabwe. In the First Test in Bulawayo, Pathan took 5/58 and 4/53 as well as scoring 52 in a man of the match performance to help India to an innings victory. He followed this with a 7/59 haul, his Test career best innings haul, and 5/67 in the final Test in Harare, his second ten-wicket match haul to set up a ten wicket victory, having also scored 32 in the first innings. He was again named man of the match, and his 21 wickets at 11.29 runs saw him named man of the series. This made him only the third bowler after Anil Kumble and Johnny Briggs to take 21 wickets in a two-match series.

Upon the team's return to India, Chappell experimented with Pathan by using him as an opening batsman in the Challenger Trophy prior to the late 2005 series against Sri Lankan cricket team. This yielded only moderate success with scores of 28 and 11 not out. Pathan took six wickets at 29.16 at an economy rate of 5.17. Pathan was subsequently used at No. 3 in the batting line-up in the First ODI against Sri Lanka in Nagpur, where he scored 83 runs from 70 balls to help India post a total of 6/350. Pathan also took 4/37 and 3/38 in the second and seventh matches at Mohali and Baroda respectively to win two-man of the match awards, taking ten wickets at 25.60 at ane economy rate of 5.22 for the whole series. He added a 35 in the final match and ended the series with 118 runs at 39.33, playing akey role in India's 6–1 triumph. Pathan continued his strong ODI form with another man of the match performance of 3/23 and a knock of 37 runs against South Africa in the second ODI in Bangalore, having scored 46 in the middle-order in the first match after a top-order collapse. He ended the series with six wickets at 20.33 at an economy rate of 4.69 and 83 runs at 27.66.

After scoring two consecutive ducks in the Test series against Sri Lanka, Pathan was elevated to opening in the second innings of the Second Test in Delhi, after regular opener Virender Sehwag was down with illness. Having taken 3/34 from 22 overs in the first innings, Pathan scored 93 runs, building on a first innings lead of 60 to help set up a winning target of 436. In the following match in Ahmedabad, he scored 82 runs and combined in a century stand with Laxman to revive India after an early batting collapse saw five wickets fall during the first half of the opening day. He also took seven wickets at an average of 26.00 runs in the series, which India won 2–0. Pathan later admitted that he had been disappointed in failing to score a Test century. Following his strong performances in 2005, Pathan was promoted in December to an A-grade contract by the Board of Control for Cricket in India.

Pathan had another difficult start to the new year in 2006 on the Test tour to Pakistan. In the first two Test matches played on flat surfaces in Lahore and Faisalabad, he had little success against the Pakistani batsmen, taking a total of two wickets while conceding 319 runs at more than four runs an over. After not getting an opportunity in the First Test—India lost only one wicket—Pathan made use of the good batting conditions himself and scored 90 in a double century partnership with wicket-keeper Mahendra Singh Dhoni in Faisalabad. Pathan found success with the ball in the Third Test in Karachi, when on 29 January he became the first – and to date only – person to claim a hat-trick in the first over of a Test match. It was also the highest in terms of total averages of the batsmen dismissed (130.18: Salman Butt 34.27, Younis Khan 46.04, Mohammad Yousuf 49.86) and came after 1783 Tests in the history of cricket. He had Butt caught by Dravid in the slips from an outswinger, before trapping Younis leg before wicket and bowling Yousuf, both with inswingers. He finished with a haul of 5/61 after the hosts staged a lower-order counter-attack but was punished in the second innings, taking 1 wicket while conceding 106 runs as Pakistan set a target which was beyond India's reach. Pathan ended the series with 134 runs at 44.66 and took eight wickets at 60.75. Despite his Test travails, Pathan continued to perform strongly in the ODI arena, scoring 65 in the top order in the first ODI against Pakistan in Peshawar before making three consecutive three wicket hauls in the following matches. This included a man of the match performance that included a haul of 3 wickets for 43 runs at Rawalpindi as he claimed nine wickets at 18.88 at an economy rate of 4.49 for the series. Having taken an unassailable 3–1 lead, India rested Pathan for the final match.

Pathan had a quiet series against England following his return to India, taking 8 wickets at an average of 39.37 runs and scoring 121 runs at an average of 24.20 runs in three Tests. Pathan scored 52 in the first innings of the Second Test in Mohali, helping India to a first-innings lead and eventually a nine-wicket win. In the Third Test, Pathan managed only 1/84 in total and scored 26 and 6 as they collapsed on the final day and ceded their series lead. Again his ODI form was unaffected, taking eleven wickets at 15.63 in five matches, and scoring 123 runs at 41.00 with the bat as India easily claimed the series 5–1. Pathan scored 28 and then took 3/21 in a low-scoring 29-win in the first match, before scoring 36 and taking 4/51 in the third match in Goa. India then took an unassailable 4–0 lead by winning the fourth match, in which Pathan took 1/27 before scoring 46 in the run-chase.

=== Drop in form again ===
Pathan began to suffer a loss of form during the tour of the West Indies in May 2006, when he managed only 24 runs at 6.00 and took 6 wickets at 29.83 at an economy rate of 5.59 while bowling in the ODI arena as India lost the series 4–1. After a poor display in a tour match, in which he was hit for 70 runs in 12 overs and appeared jaded, he was dropped from the Test team as V. R. V. Singh became the third place bowler and captain Rahul Dravid scrapped the five bowler strategy. Pathan only played once in the Second Test, after Sreesanth was sidelined due to injury. He scored 19 and took 1/43 and 1/50 as India enforced the follow on but the hosts hung on for a draw with three wickets in hand. India then selected two spinners in the last two Tests, and Pathan could not gain one of the two pace positions. Chappell stated that Pathan was fatigued and had been overworked but was confident that Pathan "would recover from his slump and rise to further heights", asserting that he was still young and learning. Former India paceman Javagal Srinath expressed concern about Pathan's dwindling pace, but expressed that swing was the first priority in backing Pathan's return to international cricket.

These concerns were further magnified in late 2006, when Pathan conceded 54 runs in six overs in the first two matches of a triangular ODI tournament in Malaysia. Despite scoring 64 in the top-order in the first of these matches against the West Indies, Pathan was dropped for the rest of the tournament. He appeared to have run into some form during the Challenger Trophy when he took five wickets at 15.80 at an economy rate of 4.64 and scored 95 runs at 31.66 in three matches.

Pathan was then demoted from the position of an opening bowler in ODIs during the 2006 Champions Trophy; he took four wickets at 24.00 at an economy rate of 4.80, and scored only 29 runs at 9.66, as India were knocked out in the first round. Pathan was then limited to sporadic ODI appearances on the late-2006 tour to South Africa. Playing in three of the five matches, he took a solitary wicket at 136.00, conceding 7.15 runs per over, the only bright spot being an unbeaten 47 as India were skittled for 163 in one match; they were whitewashed by the hosts.

Since the West Indies tour in May 2006, Pathan had only been taking wickets at 41.33. He subsequently fell out of the Top 10 of the ICC bowling rankings and the Top 5 of the All rounder rankings after having spent the previous year on the list. Despite this, Indian captain Rahul Dravid remained optimistic about Pathan's prospects, stating "The number of Man-of-the-Matches that Irfan has won is a testimony to the fact that he's a proven matchwinner for us. He takes wickets early, contributes with the bat, is good in the field." Despite top scoring in both innings of a first-class warm-up match in Potchefstroom, scoring 111 not out and 40 not out whilst many specialist batsmen failed to cope with the bouncy conditions, he totalled only 1/49 from eight overs with the ball and was overlooked by the selectors for the First Test in Johannesburg. This indicated that although he had scored 560 runs at 35.00 under Chappell's coaching, they saw bowling, which had been steadily declining, as his primary responsibility. After a poor bowling display in the subsequent tour match in which he conceded 74 runs in only 11 overs, Pathan became the first player to be sent home by the BCCI during a tour for poor performance rather than indiscipline. It was later revealed by Kiran More that it was a mutual agreement so that Pathan could play for Baroda in the final two rounds of Ranji Trophy in an attempt to regain form via match practice instead of watching the final two Tests from the sidelines. He subsequently led Baroda to the semi-finals after scoring 82* to help defeat Uttar Pradesh by five wickets, but his bowling remained ineffective, returning figures of 2/108 and 1/59, conceding 4.77 runs per over. Former Indian captain Sunil Gavaskar attributed Pathan's situation to mismanagement, asserting that Pathan has been "messed about" as well as insinuating foul play. Pathan's fortunes improved in the next two matches, totalling 5/92 and 7/96 against Tamil Nadu and Mumbai respectively.

Pathan was initially dropped for the ODI series hosted by India against the West Indies, but was recalled for the final match in his home town after claiming seven wickets against Mumbai in the Ranji Trophy semi-final. His performance was regarded as lacklustre, taking 1/43 from seven overs. The selectors persisted and named him in the squad for the 2007 Cricket World Cup, but injury stopped him from playing in the ODI series against Sri Lanka, denying him an opportunity to regain form. Pathan on his return took two wickets of the overs which he bowled. He had an impressive start as he took the wicket of Lendl Simmons as a Leg Before Wicket. For his performances in 2006, he was named in the World ODI XI by the ICC.

After taking 1/12 and 3/25 in warm-up matches against the Netherlands and the West Indies in the Caribbean, Pathan did not play a match at the World Cup, and was among a group of players to be dropped from the squad following India's exit from the first round. He played no part in the tours of Bangladesh and England. Instead, he was sent on an India A tour of Africa. Two years after devastating the Zimbabwean batsmen, he played against a Zimbabwe Select XI, he took only six wickets at 30.16 in two matches, and then took eight wickets at 18.12 in two matches against Kenya. India won all four matches, and Pathan scored 87 runs at 21.75. Pathan then took six wickets at 23.83 and scored 93 runs at 31.00 in four one-dayers.

=== Strong comeback ===
With India's older players opting out of the inaugural World Twenty20, Pathan was one of several younger players to regain national selection. India were not expected to do well in a format that favoured stronger fielding teams. In the first match, he scored 20 and took 2/20 in four overs as India tied with Pakistan in the first round, before winning in a bowl-out. He then took 0/16 as India lost to New Zealand before taking 3/37 in a defeat of England. India needed a win over hosts South Africa to reach the semi-final and Pathan conceded only 16 runs from his four overs, helping to restrict the hosts to 9/116 in pursuit of 154. Pathan then took 2/44, removing Brad Hodge and Andrew Symonds as India managed to defend 188 for a 15-run win to reach the finals. India faced arch-rivals Pakistan in the final. Pathan was declared the Man of the match after bowling a tidy spell and taking 3/16, including the removal of Pakistan captain Shoaib Malik and then the big-hitting Shahid Afridi for a duck in the space of three balls, before later bowling Yasir Arafat.

As a result of his performances in South Africa, Pathan was recalled to the ODI team and played in the home series against Australia and Pakistan in late 2007. He played in all 12 matches, seven against Australia and five against Pakistan. Pathan scored 131 runs at 18.71 in the lower-order and took 12 wickets at 46.00 at an economy rate of 5.02, averaging substantially worse than his overall career statistics. It was a steady performance; Pathan never took more than two wickets in any match and his economy rate was always between 4.60 and 6.66 and scored 26 and 29 in consecutive matches in Baroda and Rajkot against Australia before making 43 in the final match against Pakistan.

With India opting to field two spinners and two pacemen on turning tracks in the home Test series against Pakistan in late 2007, Pathan missed the first two Tests as Zaheer and Rudra Pratap Singh were the fast bowlers chosen. In the meantime, he took 11 wickets at 23.81 and scored 90 runs at 30.00 in two Ranji Trophy matches. Injury to both Zaheer and Singh in his colleagues resulted in his recall for the Third Test at Bangalore. Pathan scored his maiden Test century, reaching the mark with a six from leg spinner Danish Kaneria to move from 96 to 102 with only last man, paceman Ishant Sharma left to accompany him, before holing out in the same over. He made 21 not out in the second innings but was unpenetrative with the ball, taking a total of 1/110 as the tourists hung on for a draw.

Pathan gained selection for the 2007–08 tour of Australia, but did not play in the first two Tests with only two pacemen chosen. Zaheer and Singh were the first-choice pace duo before the former was injured and replaced by Ishant, who had taken five wickets in the first innings of the Bangalore Test. With the Third Test held on the bouncy WACA Ground in Perth, Pathan replaced second spinner Harbhajan Singh. He batted well with scores of 28 and 46 respectively. His second innings performance came as a nightwatchman in order to shield other batsmen from the new ball late in the second day. After entering at the fall of the first wicket, he batted for more than two hours and was the sixth man to fall. Pathan rediscovered his ability to swing the ball, taking 2/63 and 3/54, including both Australian openers in each innings, having the hosts two wickets down in both innings before 50 runs had been scored. He had four of his victims caught behind the wicket off an edge and trapped Chris Rogers lbw. India won by 72 runs and Pathan was recognised with the man of the match award.

After his batting displays in Perth, Pathan was promoted to open the batting in the Fourth Test in Adelaide, replacing the struggling Wasim Jaffer and thereby allowing Harbhajan to return in a five-bowler attack. In a high-scoring match, Pathan took 3/112, but he struggled with the responsibility of opening, scoring nine and a duck. In a high-scoring match, he took 3/112 in Australia's 563.Following the Test series, he top-scored with 26 as India were skittles for 74 in the one-off T20 international. Pathan held his place in the ODI team and played all 10 matches in the Commonwealth Bank Trophy, scoring 118 runs at 19.66 mostly in the lower order and taking 11 wickets at 34.27 at an economy rate of 5.49. His best performance was a 4/41 against Australia at Adelaide to help restrict the hosts to 203 but India then collapsed to a 50-run loss. His top-score of 31 in the series came in partnership with captain Mahendra Singh Dhoni in the closing stages of a successful and tense run-chase against Sri Lanka. Pathan struggled in the two finals against Australia, taking three wickets at 39.00 at an economy rate of 7.46 but his teammates did enough to ensure a 2–0 win. An extra bowler backfired as the batsmen struggled. Pathan top-scored with 21* in India's first innings of 76 on the first morning and was again unbeaten in the second innings with 43. However, he failed to take a wicket and conceded 85 runs in only 21.2 overs in an innings defeat, and was omitted from the next Test. After the South Africa series, Pathan participated in the 2008 Indian Premier League, having been purchased by the Kings XI Punjab.

He took 15 wickets at 23.33 at the economy rate of 6.60 runs per over. His most effective performance came when he added an unbeaten 24 and took 2/18 from his four overs to help Punjab to a nine-run win over the Kolkata Knight Riders. He scored 131 runs at 21.83 and added 40 in a failed run-chase against Chennai Super Kings.

=== Back on the fringes ===
Following the IPL, Pathan resumed international duties in the Kitply Cup and the 2008 Asia Cup. He had an unproductive time with the ball; although he scored a total of 86 runs at 28.66, he took seven wickets at 51.42 at an economy rate of 6.56. Pathan was overlooked for the Tests in Sri Lanka but was called into the team for the one-dayers, but played in only three of the five fixtures. He took three wickets at 34.66, conceding 5.20 runs an over, and struggled with the bat, scoring 19 runs at 6.33 as the Indian batting collapsed in each match. He was then included in an India A team for a series of matches against touring counterparts from New Zealand and Australia. He had average results, taking four wickets at 43.75 and an economy rate of 4.86, and scored 56 runs at 18.66 in four games. He did better the Challenger Trophy, taking six wickets at 14.00 at an economy rate of 3.42, and scored 71 runs at 35.50 as India Blue won all three matches.

At the start of the first-class season, Pathan scored 56 but took a total of only 1/91 for the Board President's XI against the touring Australians ahead of the Test series, and he was overlooked for Test selection as India used only two pacemen. He returned to play for Baroda in the Ranji Trophy. He played in four matches and performed strongly, taking 26 wickets at 16.03 and scored 166 runs at 33.20. He started the season with 6/85 and 1/34 in a draw against Uttar Pradesh, and then took 4/42 and 1/46 against Railways. He then put on an all-round display to guide his team to a victory over Maharashtra. Pathan took 5/64 and then scored 51 as Baroda made 305 in their first innings to take a 77-run lead. After taking 1/61 in the second innings, he scored an unbeaten 50 to guide Baroda to their target of 227 with four wickets in hand. In his final Ranji fixture for the season, he took 7/35 in the first innings to help dismiss Andhra Pradesh for 77, setting up an innings win. However, with India persisting with and tasting success with their Test bowling strategy, Pathan was also overlooked for the home Tests against England. Pathan's domestic season was interrupted by spasmodic limited overs duty. Following his recent uneconomical run in ODIs, he was not given a game in the seven-match series against England in November until India had taken an unassailable 4–0 series lead. He took 0/57 from ten overs in the fifth match, as India recorded another victory, but did not get another opportunity after the Mumbai terrorist attacks saw the two remaining fixtures cancelled. Pathan was then selected for the early-2009 five-match ODI tour of Sri Lanka, but was not entrusted with a match until India took an unbeatable 3–0 lead. He took four wickets at 28.25 in two matches, but was again expensive, conceding 7.06 runs an over. However, he ended the tour on a high note when he combined with half-brother Yusuf in an unbroken eighth-wicket stand that saw India to a three-wicket win in the T20 international after a late flurry; Irfan ended on 33 not out. Pathan returned to India and took 3/50 and scored 51 not out in his only domestic one-dayer for Baroda during the season, which ended in a win, before leaving for the limited overs leg of a tour to New Zealand.

Pathan had a poor time in New Zealand. In the two T20 internationals preceding the ODIs, he took 0/38 and 2/41, conceding his runs at an alarming economy rate of 11.28. He was left out of all five ODIs during the tour before heading home. He then played in all 14 of Punjab's round-robin matches in the 2009 Indian Premier League held in South Africa, taking 17 wickets at 22.94 with an economy rate of 7.74, and scored 196 runs at 19.60. He started strongly, taking nine wickets in four matches in the early stages of the tournament, before taking only two in the next five matches, and ending with six in the last three fixtures. Punjab failed to make the semi-finals.

Pathan's performances in the IPL were enough for him to retain his position in the national T20 team after his performances in New Zealand, and he then proceeded to the 2009 ICC World Twenty20 in England in June, where India were seeking to defend their title. He struggled in the warm-up matches, totalling 1/49 in five overs, and again in the first round of matches, bowling five overs and conceding 42 runs without success. Nevertheless, India defeated both Bangladesh and Ireland to move into the next round. He took 1/9 from two overs in the loss to the West Indies in the Super 8 round, and was left out for the remaining two matches, which India lost to be eliminated.

Since then, Pathan was dropped from the limited overs team and was then injured for an extended period, until he made his return to cricket in the Ranji Trophy in November. He played in six matches for Baroda as captain and was successful with both bat and ball, scoring 397 runs at 49.62 and taking 22 wickets at 18.54. In his most productive first-class season with the bat, Pathan made starts in eight of his nine innings, only failing to reach 24 once, and scoring four fifties, although he was unable to convert any to triple figures. In his fourth match of the season, Pathan top-scored in both innings with 68 and 81 as Baroda lost to Karnataka by an innings after making 153 and 223. He then took a total of 7/76 and scored 65 not out to secure a seven-wicket win over Saurashtra, and then totalled 7/96 in a seven-wicket triumph over Maharashtra. However, these performances were not enough to earn Pathan a Test recall. Furthermore, on 25 February 2010 the Board of Control for Cricket in India (BCCI) announced its list of 30 probables for the T20 World Cup to be held in the West Indies, the most notable omission being Irfan Pathan.

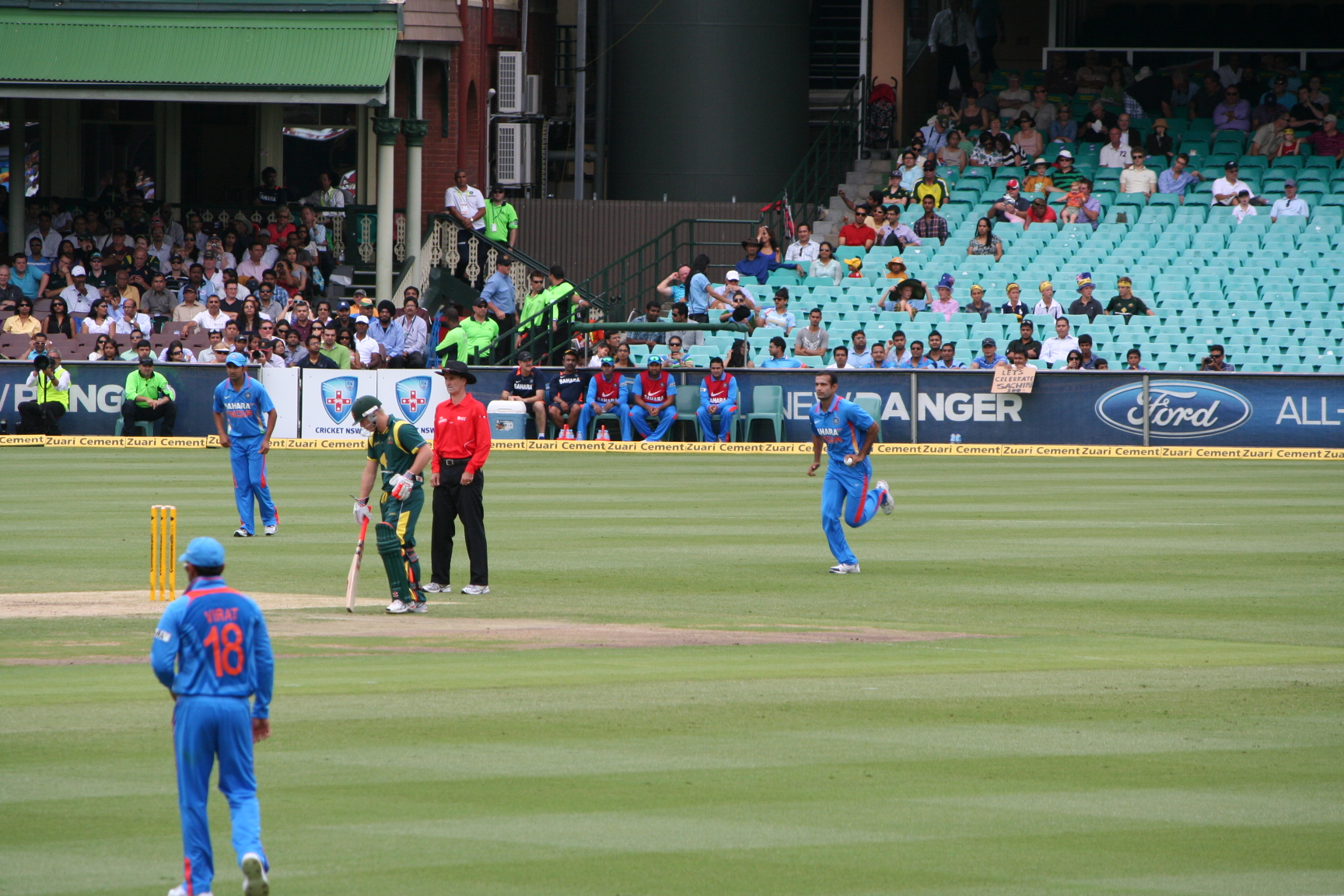
Irfan Pathan taking his run-up in an ODI against Australia in 2012

Pathan took 5/100 in the first innings of the Duleep Trophy final against South Zone. His fifth wicket brought up his 300th scalp at first-class level. After cricket was engulfed in a series of corruption scandals in September 2010, Pathan told the media that he had received "three expensive gifts in his room" and, later, two further gifts that he could not afford. Pathan reported this to the team management as he thought the gifts might be from a bookmaker.

=== Comeback and knee injury 2011 ===
Irfan Pathan was recalled for India's ODI squad for last two matches of five match one-day series against West Indies in December 2011, and played in last match of the series, picking the wicket of first ball.

He was selected for the Commonwealth Bank Series, playing four games and scoring 96 runs at an average of 24 with a top score of 47. He also succeeded in taking 6 wickets at an average of 31.16; his best figures were 3/16. His strong performances led to his inclusion in the Asia Cup squad. He played three matches and did not get a chance to bat but he proved himself with the ball taking 4/32 in the first match of the series against Sri Lanka. He picked up two more wickets in the next two games. He was the part of the team touring South Africa for the one T20 played on 31 March 2012 where he had figures of 4–0–44–1 but was yet to bat. Pathan also played for the Delhi Daredevils the Indian Premier League in 2012, taking only 8 wickets from 17 matches with an average of 58.12. BCCI announced on 13 July 2012 inclusion of Irfan Pathan in the Indian team for the tour of Sri Lanka as a replacement to the injured Vinay Kumar. With his all round performance, India managed to win four of the five ODIs and the lone T20 match in the next series in Sri Lanka. Pathan emerged as the top wicket taker with a five-wicket haul.

Pathan was a part of the Indian squad for the 2012 ICC World Twenty20 tournament in Sri Lanka. In the Ranji Trophy 2012–13 opener against Karnataka, Pathan raised his First-class top-score to 121 with his 3rd domestic hundred. But, he injured his knee during match and only made comeback to cricket in March 2013. In 2014 he was picked up by Sunrisers Hyderabad to play in the Indian Premier League.

=== Retirement ===
Irfan Pathan retired from all forms of cricket in January 2020.

== Beyond cricket ==
=== Jhalak Dikhhla Jaa ===
Pathan was a contestant on the Colors TV popular dance show Jhalak Dikhhla Jaa for the 8th season, in 2015. He impressed many people with his dancing skills, staying until he quit in the 6th week on 22 August 2015.

=== Cricket Academy of Pathans ===
The Cricket Academy Of Pathans was jointly launched by Irfan Pathan and Yusuf Pathan. The academy has tied up with former Indian coach

== Filmography ==
=== Hindi Films ===
Key
†	Denotes films that have not yet been released

Year	Film	Role(s)	Language	Notes	Ref(s)
2003	Jab Chaye Mera Jaadoo	Himself	Hindi	Short film	
2004	Mujhse Shaadi Karogi	Himself	Hindi	Special appearance	
2005	Oye Bubbly	Himself	Hindi	Short film	
2008	Taarak Mehta Ka Ooltah Chashmah	Himself	Hindi	Special appearance	

=== Tamil Films ===
Key
†	Denotes films that have not yet been released

Year	Film	Role(s)	Language	Notes	Ref(s)
2022	Cobra	Aslan Yilmaz	Tamil	Debut lead role film	
