= Indian cricket team in Australia in 2003–04 =

2003–04 Border–Gavaskar Trophy
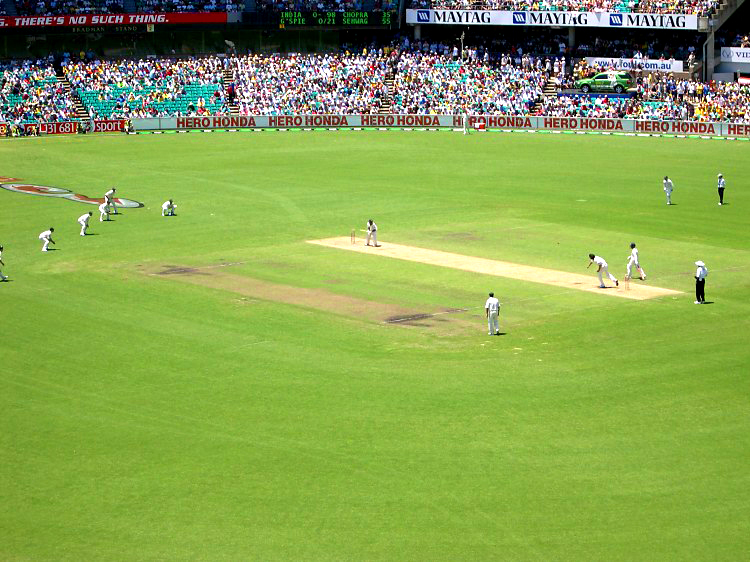
- Jason Gillespie bowls to Akash Chopra, SCG, 2 January 2004
- Date: 25 November 2003 – 8 February 2004
- Location: Australia
- Result: Series drawn 1–1
- Player of the series: (India) Rahul Dravid
Teams
- India: Australia
Captains
- Sourav Ganguly: Steve Waugh
Most runs
- Rahul Dravid (619) VVS Laxman (494) Virender Sehwag (464): Ricky Ponting (706); Matthew Hayden (451); Justin Langer (369)
Most wickets
- Anil Kumble (24) Ajit Agarkar (16) Zaheer Khan (5): Stuart MacGill (14); Jason Gillespie (10); Brett Lee (8)

This Border–Gavaskar Trophy was composed of seven first-class matches, including four Tests. India also participated in an ODI tri-series with Australia and Zimbabwe. The Test series was drawn 1–1, and India retained the Border–Gavaskar Trophy because of their victory in the Trophy's previous contest. In the 2003–04 series' Adelaide Test, Rahul Dravid scored a double century, securing a famous win for India. Sachin Tendulkar scored 241* in Sydney, which up until that point in his career was his highest score in a Test match. Captain Sourav Ganguly made his first test century against Australia, a 144 in Brisbane that gave his team a lead of 86 after they were in trouble. VVS Laxman played consistently well throughout this series, most notably his contribution in the Adelaide test is well remembered. This series was also the last for Steve Waugh, who had captained Australia to a record equalling 16 consecutive test match victories and had 41 victories in 57 Tests.

== Tour matches ==
=== Victoria v Indians ===
25 – 27 Nov 2003
Scorecard

Indians	v	Victoria
266/9 (dec) (90 overs); Sadagoppan Ramesh 87; Sachin Tendulkar 80; Mathew Inness 4/64 (20 overs)		518/8 (dec) (134 overs); Brad Hodge 264; Ian Harvey 71; Ashish Nehra 2/91 (29 overs)
116/2 (42 overs); Akash Chopra 55*; Sadagoppan Ramesh 36; Andrew McDonald 1/15 (6 overs)

Match drawn
MCG, Melbourne, Australia
Umpires: Richard Patterson, and John Ward

- Indians won the toss and chose to bat

=== Queensland Academy of Sport v Indians ===
29 Nov – 1 Dec 2003
Scorecard

Queensland Academy of Sport	v	Indians
304/6 (dec) (81 overs); Lee Carseldine 112; Craig Philipson 85; Anil Kumble 4/74 (26 overs)		208/9 (dec) (73 overs); VVS Laxman 74; Rahul Dravid 38; Joe Dawes 3/36 (17 overs)
208 (52 overs); Lee Carseldine 109*; Daniel Payne 35; Irfan Pathan 2/54 (13 overs)		121/4 (52 overs); Sadagoppan Ramesh 37*; Sourav Ganguly 35; Joe Dawes 1/10 (7 overs)

Match drawn
Allan Border Field, Brisbane, Australia
Umpires: Norm McNamara, Jim Torpey

- Queensland Academy of Sport won the toss and decided to bat

=== Australia A v Indians ===
19-21 Dec 2003
Scorecard

Australia A	v	Indians
311/5 (dec) (74.4 overs); Martin Love 94; Chris Rogers 70; Ashish Nehra 2/33 (10 overs)		245 (82.5 overs); Parthiv Patel 49; Akash Chopra 46; Matthew Nicholson 4/25 (21.5 overs)
241 (65 overs); Michael Clarke 131; Brad Hodge 33; Lakshmipathy Balaji 3/87 (22 overs)		66/2 (33 overs); Akash Chopra 25; Sadagoppan Ramesh 22; Paul Rofe 1/5 (8 overs)

Match drawn
Bellerive Oval, Hobart, Australia
Umpires: Peter Parker, Bob Parry

- Australia A won the toss and decided to bat

== Test series ==
=== 1st Test ===
4-8 Dec 2003
Scorecard

Australia	v	India
323 (78.1 overs); Justin Langer 121; Zaheer Khan 5/95 (23 overs)		409 (120.1 overs); Sourav Ganguly 144; Jason Gillespie 4/65 (31 overs)
284/3d (62 overs); Matthew Hayden 99; Ajit Agarkar 1/45 (12 overs); Ashish Nehra 1/89 (19 overs)		73/2 (16 overs); Rahul Dravid 43*; Nathan Bracken 2/12 (4 overs)

Match drawn
The Gabba, Woolloongabba, Brisbane
Umpires: Steve Bucknor, Rudi Koertzen
Player of the match: Sourav Ganguly

- India won the toss and decided to field

Match report

Debuts: Nathan Bracken (Australia)

First day:

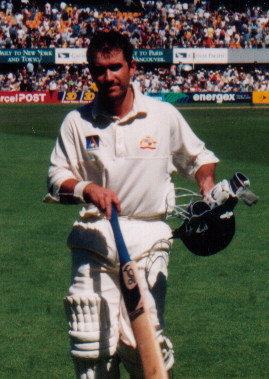
Justin Langer cracked a century and troubled the Indians even though he was not in the best of form

The pitch at the Gabba had a green top, which was acknowledged as being greener than the Gabba ever was. There was heavy cloud cover all day too. These conditions were accepted as being the Indian bowlers' only chance to quell the Australian bowlers as their bowling relied more on swing rather than pure pace. Sourav Ganguly, the Indian Captain won the toss and chose to field, but Zaheer Khan, India's opening bowler bowled a wayward first spell and then he and Ashish Nehra bowled consistently on a full-length basis, which resulted in the accumulation of runs for the Australian openers, Matthew Hayden and Justin Langer. While Hayden played aggressively, Langer played stylishly, in an almost "apologetic" manner.

The duo piled up the runs before the Indians luck changed when Akash Chopra caught Langer off Ashish Nehra's no-ball at square leg. After this, the Indian bowlers made the batsmen play and miss more frequently and Zaheer Khan produced a good spell. But it was not until the score read 73 that India separated the two Australians. Zaheer Khan took Hayden's first wicket with a flashy delivery, which Hayden edged to VVS Laxman at slips for 37 made from 52 balls.

The new batsman Ricky Ponting walked in and was greeted by Ajit Agarkar's beautiful first over, but Agarkar was quickly removed from the attack after some poor bowling resulted in damage of his figures which read: 5–1–40–0. Then having no other options, Ganguly turned towards the only spinner in his team, Harbhajan Singh. Harbhajan had dismissed Ponting five times in the 2000–01 series and had troubled the Australians with 32 wickets in three tests, but this time his first ball was savagely cut by Langer, and then Ponting dealt with him in the same manner.

During the course of their 89-run partnership, neither spin nor pace could unsettle the two batsmen. Then against the run of play, Zaheer Khan got the wicket of Ponting with a short delivery. Damien Martyn walked in at 162/2. He was unhurried and played his own game, which ESPNcricinfo writer Anand Vasu wrote, was "very pleasing to the eye". Finally, when no play was possible due to bad light, Australia had finished at 262/2 from 62 overs at an above-par run-rate of 4.22, with Langer finishing at 115 from 175 balls, and Martyn finishing at 42. At the end of the day, Langer hailed this century as one of his "best".

Second day

Play started at 11:30 am on the second day and Zaheer Khan and Ajit Agarkar, had been refreshed after a break after day one. The first batsman to be dismissed by the two Indian quicks was Justin Langer. He was dismissed by Agarkar's skiddy medium pace which was aided by late swing. Langer had just smashed Agarkar's previous ball to the fence, when he got dismissed off the next ball by a ball that pitched just in the line of the off-stump and would, as replays went on to show, have not gone past leg-stump. He was dismissed for 121. Australia's score read 268/3. Next man in was Steve Waugh playing his final test at Brisbane.

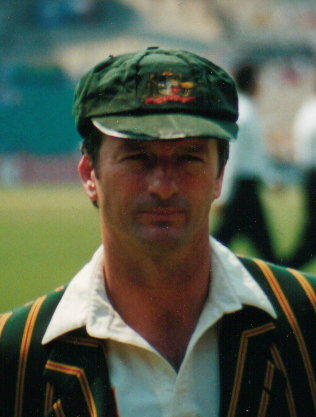
Steve Waugh's last test at Brisbane was marred by unfortunate circumstances of a run-out and his failure with the bat

Waugh had walked in amidst loud ovation, and his arrival was widely anticipated. However, he immediately got into trouble, when, Martyn punched a ball through covers, and then ran two for it. Waugh then backed up for a third run, but Martyn pleaded to him emphatically enough to ignore the run. However, by the time Waugh did heed the call, it was too late for him to turn around. Martyn then sacrificed his wicket for his captain's. He was run out by Harbhajan Singh's throw from the deep, which Parthiv Patel took and whipped off the bails. However, the strangeness of the dismissal was accentuated by the fact that the ball was a no-ball. Waugh could not redeem himself as he got out shortly to a short ball by Zaheer Khan, and while trying to negotiate a ball from Zaheer, overbalanced and trod on his stumps. This dismissal gave him the dubious distinction of being the only man to be dismissed in every way possible in cricket, barring obstructing the field and timed out. Referring to his failure and the unfortunate mix-up between him and Damien Martyn, Greg Chappell mentioned in an interview that Waugh's last mile was going to be uphill from then. Waugh's dismissal brought the score down to 275/5.

During lunchtime, the rain-gods visited the Gabba and confined the players indoors till 4:20 pm. The next session of play after that was dominated by the Indians. Adam Gilchrist, the next batsman in, was usually known to reply with a furious fifty or hundred, but he too, did not hang around for too long, as he lasted for four balls and did not trouble the scorers at all and departed for a duck with the scoreline being 276/6. Again his manner of dismissal was familiar: caught Laxman, bowled Zaheer. Buoyant and hopeful of their prospects of cleaning up the tail after Gilchrist's wicket, the Indians scalped the wicket of Andy Bichel(11 runs) caught by Laxman again, off Agarkar's bowling, then Simon Katich, who had contributed 16 runs to the score, before his nervous stay at the wicket was ended by a tentative poke at a Zaheer delivery to wicket-keeper Parthiv Patel.

Jason Gillespie was distinctly uncomfortable during his stay at the crease as he was tested immediately by a few Ajit Agarkar deliveries before being run-out after attempting an over-ambitious fourth run to reduce Australia to 317/9. The Australian tailenders added further six runs before light worsened and play could not be continued anymore. The Indians had dominated a damp squib of a day, where only sixteen overs could be bowled. The Australian batsmen squandered a strong platform set by their top-order, to lose an incredible 7 wickets for 61 runs. The second day of the match was notable for the sixteen overs of play during which only two bowlers were used: Ajit Agarkar and Zaheer Khan. However, on a worrying note, the Indian Captain Sourav Ganguly was warned for his bowlers not completing nine fewer overs than the scheduled number of overs that was to be bowled. This constituted a level two offence in the ICC's Code of Conduct and Ganguly was liable to be penalised fifty percent of his match-fees. This risked Ganguly being the first captain in test cricket to be docked for slow over-rates after he became the first captain to be docked a couple of runs for running in the Danger Area in a test against New Zealand in Ahmedabad earlier that year.

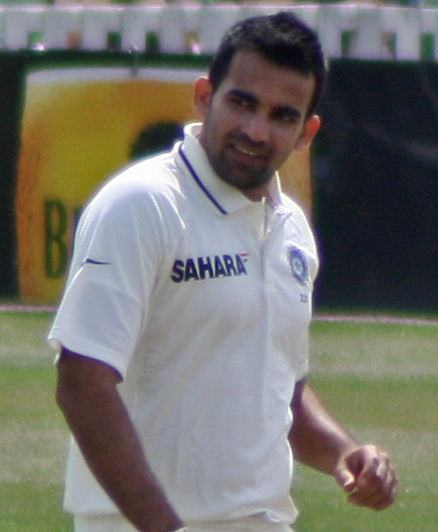
Zaheer Khan's bowling displays brought India back into the game

Praise was reserved for the Indian bowlers' extensively penetrative bowling and their ebullient comeback after a tolling day which saw them becoming increasingly despondent and lacklustre. Zaheer Khan bowled half of the sixteen overs possible on that day and his figures were: 8–0–42–3. These figures if expensive, belied the fact that Khan bowled according to the plans the Indians had set to different Australian batsmen. Zaheer hit an unplayable line and length mark right from his very first over and did not let any batsman settle. Agarkar kept Martyn quiet with some deliveries that the batsman played and missed. Greg Chappell and Sunil Gavaskar, two players who had played in the 1981 Melbourne test match between the two countries, when India defeated the Australians by 59 runs after setting them a target of 143, reckoned that the Indian bowlers' performances were quite close to the bowling heroics put up by the Indian team in that match. Overall, Zaheer's 5/95 was his third successive five-wicket haul in tests.

Third day

The third day brought frustration for all players alike and the spectators too, as the weather proved to be extremely unkind, delaying the start of the day's play and hastening its end. The 9,136 spectators who had assembled to witness whether their home team could inspire a fightback of the sort the Indians produced the previous day, but it was treated to long hours of waiting, and when the play did begin it seemed like a farcical proceeding, for the day's play began only at 3:18 pm and ended just 37 minutes later, at 3:55 pm. The day's play however, was not shorn of its drama and excitement. In the 38 balls that were sent down on the third day, one was enough to clean up the Australian tail. Ajit Agarkar bowling the first over of the day, bowled the first delivery of the day short and wide of off-stump. Stuart MacGill, the batsman played an ugly shot, a clumsy sweep, which only succeeded in procuring an edge which ballooned to Akash Chopra at point. Perhaps MacGill felt embarrassed by his own shot selection as he was seen grinning sheepishly to Nathan Bracken, the non-striker after his dismissal.

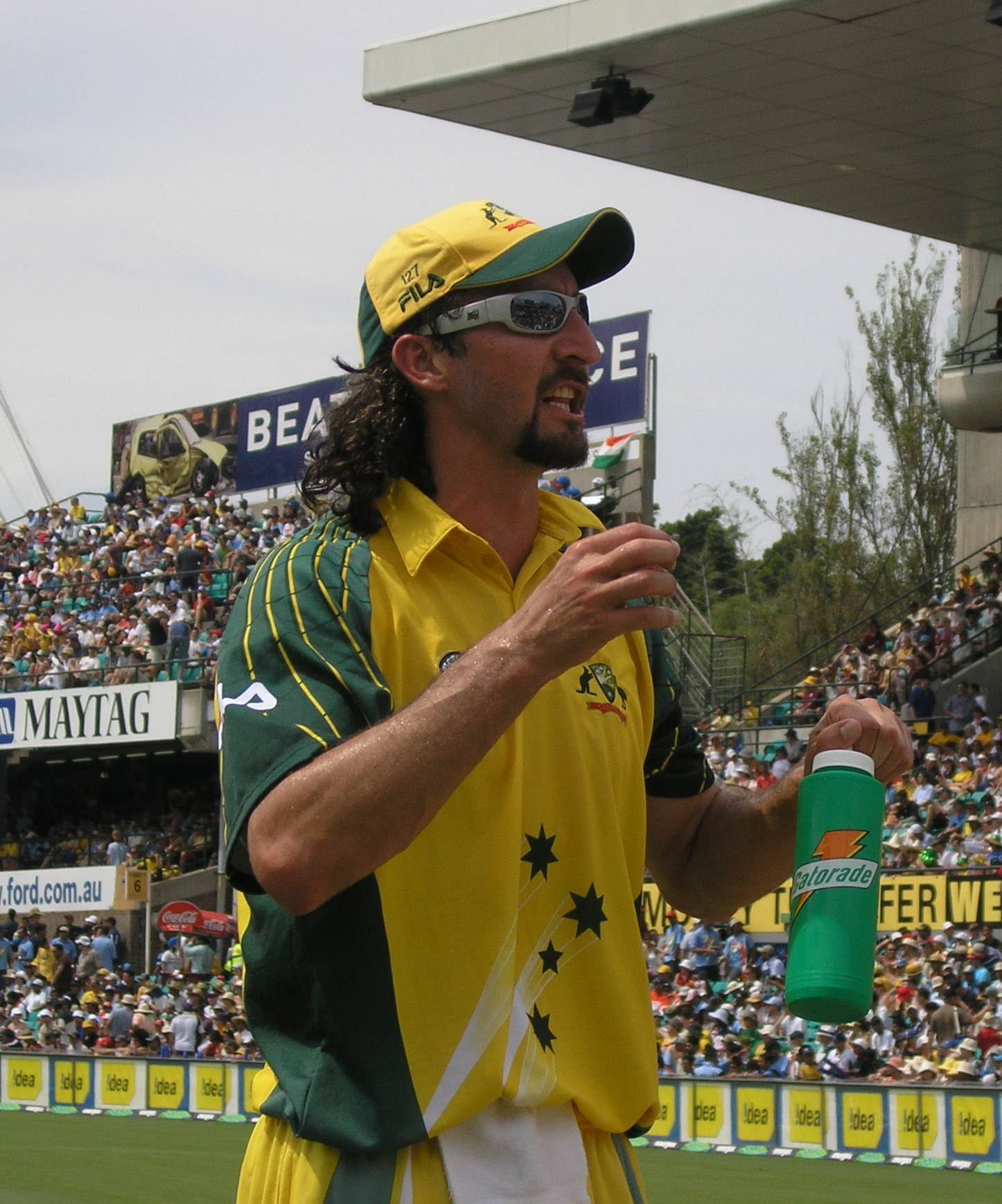
Jason Gillespie severely tested the Indian bowlers as was expected of him

Finally after Australia ended their innings on 323, the Indian openers Chopra and Virender Sehwag faced the uphill task of facing 35 balls of high-quality swing and seam bowling, which was aided by a track which had enough grass on it to suggest that it would assist seam movement. Further, the overcast and gloomy skies did not bode too well for the Indian openers. Taking advantage of these conditions and the fact that Chopra was playing in only his third test, Jason Gillespie produced an incisive spell of bowling. His very first ball indicated that there would be a touch of outswing for him. He stuck the right length time and again, and he beat Chopra's edge frequently, making him play and miss. However, if he was beaten, Chopra did not betray any sign of that fact and played out the two frontline bowlers with assurance. Sehwag was beaten time and again by Nathan bracken, who, despite playing only his first test, generated a lot of bounce with his natural high-arm action and dominated Sehwag throughout. Sehwag, though treated his sluggish start without the slightest care and played on with nonchalance. Both of the openers made five each and India had reached 11/0 from 6.1 overs when play was concluded at that stage.

Fourth day

At the close of the fourth day's play, though India had no chance of winning anything, they dished up a performance they could have been proud of. To summarize the events that happened on that day, India closed at 362/6 from 105 overs, with VVS Laxman and the Indian Captain Sourav Ganguly helping themselves to some runs. Laxman scored 75 runs from 113 balls with 11 boundaries, while Sourav Ganguly played the innings that defined the test match and made the day memorable for one and all. He scored 144 runs from just 196 balls laced with 18 shots to the ropes.

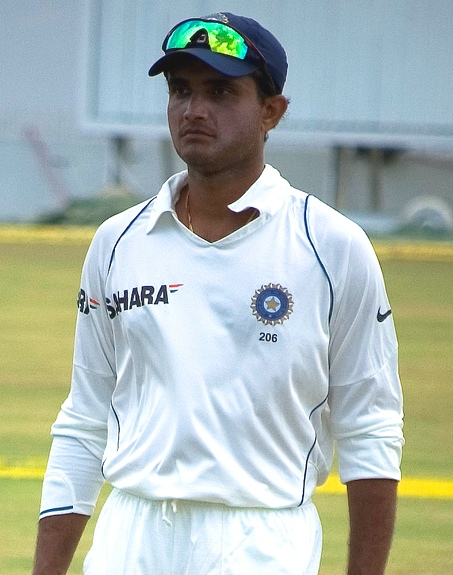
Sourav Ganguly hit a majestic and imperious 144 from 196 balls

The day began well, and the weather was pleasant and sunny. Steve Waugh immediately unleashed his pack of fast bowlers, who posed a formidable threat to the Indian pair of Sehwag and Chopra. But the two openers, handled them with ease and looked the part of a top order pair. Sehwag took advantage of an ordinary bowling spell by Andy Bichel, flicking and driving confidently. He could not, however, negotiate the full and swinging deliveries and was dropped off one such delivery by Nathan Bracken. But the speedster had his revenge as he scalped Sehwag for his first wicket in tests. Sehwag departed for a fast 45 from only 51 balls. The score stood at 61/1. Later, Rahul Dravid batting on one, was tricked by a Jason Gillespie delivery into poking at a delivery that swung and seamed away. This produced a fatal edge that Hayden gleefully accepted. Dravid departed for 1 and the score was 62/2. In the very same over, Sachin Tendulkar came out to bat. After batting out two uneventful balls, Gillespie let loose a quick one. Picking the line of the ball early as the ball seemed like missing the off-stump, Tendulkar shouldered arms and the ball went and thudded onto his pads. Umpire Steve Bucknor looked blank for some time and finally raised his finger. Bucknor had already had a history of bad umpiring earlier in this match, overriding straightforward appeals against the Australian batsmen in their first innings, and this decision made things worse for him. His decision did not go too well with Tendulkar's Australian fans. Some of them reportedly made remarks like: ""Didn't he turn down two straightforward appeals against the Australian batsmen on the first day? Don't they call him a batsman's umpire?" and some others said, "Hey mate, we came to watch Tendulkar bat, not Bucknor wag his finger." But Tendulkar took the decision with grace. Robert Craddock, writing in The Australian, commented that, "World cricket does not need electronic help to sort out lbw decisions. It just needs better umpiring. Steve Bucknor shouldn't have needed a camera to give Sachin Tendulkar not out when he was struck high ... Bucknor, a delightful fellow, was a great umpire at his zenith but there have been signs in recent times he is slipping and there is a gap emerging between his still high reputation and his performance." Rajan Bala also wrote in the Asian Age:"In an earlier birth Bucknor might have been one of those Roman emperors who ensured that the crowds at the Coliseum were kept in suspense before he gave the thumbs-down signal to end the life of a gladiator or a Christian." In fact, so annoyed were the fans that during Ganguly's innings, when he was struck in the shoulder, they said aloud: "Give him out now." The comment was noted to be quite sarcastic in nature.

India were reduced to shambles at 62/3, and then Ganguly came out to the middle. Ganguly was the unenviable possessor of a batting average of below 30 in Australia, and his weakness at handling the short delivery was only too well-documented. Therefore, there were some suggestions that Ganguly would drop himself down the order to no.6, so as to delay facing the Australian pacemen as much as possible. His first scoring shot was a streaky shot between gully and third slip, which brought him three runs. Then he played the odd shot outside the off-stump, but other than a few risky fours, there was nothing to suggest that he would fail. Ganguly then drove Andy Bichel between cover and mid-off for another boundary. This proved to be the integral part of his innings as he was decidedly more at ease and runs started to flow from his bat. Previously, on India's tour of England in 2002, he stroked a 128, which had a lot of unorthodox shots and some savage hitting. This innings, though, seemed to have reclaimed the majesty and beauty that Ganguly's batting had been known for. His footwork was noted to be the most intriguing part of his stay at the wicket. He did not move his feet exaggeratedly during his innings and unfurled a huge variety of strokes towards the end of the innings, without once breaking the momentum he had set. He also left the balls that were way outside the off-stump and his defense grew progressively secure and certain. He handled the short ball extremely well too, slapping them away, or ducking safely. There was superb timing and placement written all over his trademark off-side shots. In fact, Ganguly's innings provoked humorous comments from the fans who suggested that his superb strokes were a result of him dining at the Taj Mahal restaurant, whose owner was a spectator.

In the early stages of his innings, he was ably assisted by Akash Chopra, who made a solid 36, but after Chopra's dismissal, VVS Laxman walked out to bat with the scorecard reading 127/4. He started to play some sumptuous shots off back foot, a few flicks with a delectable roll of the wrists, and a characteristic swivel-pull, which signalled that he was going to get a hundred as well. Peter Roebuck wrote of his innings: "Laxman's innings was astonishing. In his hands, a bat becomes a wand...Laxman does not play any ugly shots but he is no mere stylist, for his beauty is innate. He hits the ball hard and with plenty of control and scores quickly because he can and must. He is hard to contain, for he has a wide range of strokes at his disposal and an appetite for big scores. Opponents fear his reach towards the extraordinary." For a man who had been under needless pressure, Laxman's innings was quite soothing and he dominated almost every bowler except Gillespie and MacGill, against whom he scored 7 runs off 24 balls and 14 runs off 40 balls respectively. His end came unexpectedly and almost against the run of play, as he was out slicing a short and wide delivery of MacGill's to Simon Katich, leaving India at a healthy stage of 273/5.

Ganguly carried on with Parthiv Patel, who had made an unbeaten 37. When he reached his century, his celebrations were emphatic and boisterous, as he had finally made an important innings under pressure against the best team in the world. He carried on until he reached 144, before holing out to Gillespie off MacGill. Then the score read: 329/6. Patel and Agarkar carried on until no more play was possible due to bad light.

Fifth day

The fifth day did not hold much enthusiasm as the scorecards might suggest, as India took off from where they started, from 362/6. India's tail wagged as they put on 47 runs for the loss of 4 wickets. Ajit Agarkar was the first man to be out in the morning to Andy Bichel, and then he was followed by Parthiv Patel, whose ill-fated, top-edged hook was caught by a diving Bichel off Gillespie. The two batsmen departed without India adding any run to their score. At 362/8, Zaheer Khan and Harbhajan Singh had a fine outing with the bat. Zaheer swatted a six and three boundaries in his 27 and Harbhajan hit 19 in his own inimitable fashion, as India pushed along to 409. They had obtained a lead of 86– a rarity in Australia against Australia itself. Moreover, this achievement was significant because India were written off before the match even began.

Australia's second innings began weakly, with Langer edging Agarkar to Patel before he even opened his account. Australia were then at 6/1. A window of opportunity opened up for the Indians. However, their hopes were soon evaporated by Matthew Hayden's dynamic strokeplay. He hit the ball hard, transferring his weight to the back foot often, and displayed clean and strong hits which sent the ball crashing to the fence. His powerful strokeplay ended on 99 from 98 balls. He reached 99 with a six off Ashish Nehra. The Queensland fans and the Hayden family cheered, but he missed out the century when he top-edged a sweep to Sehwag at midwicket off Harbhajan. Hayden's knock was remarkable for the disdain he treated the Indian bowlers with. He was impervious to the efforts of the Indian bowlers, which was shown by the fact that he managed to treat even the good balls contemptuously. Of the 98 balls he faced for his 99, 51 balls were good length deliveries, which were dispatched for 52 runs. When the Indian bowlers pitched the ball slightly short, he was less destructive, hitting 12 runs off 30 such deliveries. In 17 other deliveries of which 8 were half-volleys and 9 were short balls Hayden hit 19 runs and 16 runs respectively, for a total of 35 runs from the other deliveries. He dominated almost every Indian bowler he faced, except Ajit Agarkar by scoring runs at more than a run-a-ball rate.

Zaheer Khan's absence was also talked about, unable to bowl with a hamstring niggle. After Hayden's dismissal, Steve Waugh and Damien Martyn kept the scoreboard ticking with both of them scoring half-centuries, with Martyn ending on 66 not out after Waugh declared.

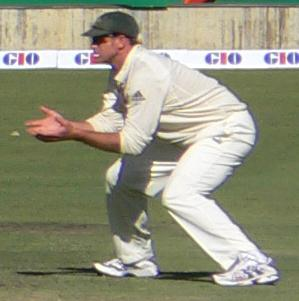
Matthew Hayden brought the Indians down to earth with a blistering 99

Australia thus gave India a target of 199 in 23 overs. The Indian openers however, started extremely badly, with both of them getting out in successive balls to Nathan Bracken, giving him a chance of bagging a hat-trick on his test debut. The match came alive after that and VVS Laxman the next batsman, avoided the hattrick by squirting the ball through gully. Thereafter, India had no problems absolutely, as Rahul Dravid and Laxman took the score to respectability with Dravid dominating the partnership, scoring 43 only off 47 balls, while Laxman charmed his way on to a breezy 24. Amazingly, for a match in which ten hours of play was lost, this match kept the spectators interested till the end.

=== 2nd Test ===
12-16 Dec 2003
Scorecard

Australia	v	India
556 (127 overs); Ricky Ponting 242; Anil Kumble 5/154 (43 overs)		523 (161.5 overs); Rahul Dravid 233; Andy Bichel 4/118 (28 overs)
196 (56.2 overs); Adam Gilchrist 43; Ajit Agarkar 6/41 (16.2 overs)		233/6 (72.4 overs); Rahul Dravid 72*; Simon Katich 1/22 (8 overs)

India won by 4 wickets
Adelaide Oval, Adelaide, Australia
Umpires: David Shepherd, Rudi Koertzen
Player of the match: Rahul Dravid

- Australia won the toss and chose to bat

Match report

Debuts: Irfan Pathan (India)

First day

The Adelaide Oval was a ground which had a flat pitch unhelpful for bowlers, and short square boundaries, which helped the Australian Batsmen, who were benefitted by their captain Steve Waugh's decision to bat first. Langer and Hayden gave their side a quick start, stitching 22 runs from 5 overs, with Hayden scoring a fast 12 off 13 balls, but the 19-year-old fast-bowler Irfan Pathan, making his debut after Zaheer Khan was nursing a strained hamstring, took Hayden's wicket for a dream start to his debut, and he took his first test wicket in only the second ball of his third over. During their relatively short stay, the two Australian openers set the tone for the day by driving along the line, exploiting a pitch, whose lack of bounce, a fast outfield, and lack of movement, proved to be frustratingly unhelpful for the Indians.

Ricky Ponting, the next man in, had a great start to his innings, creaming a boundary off only the second ball he faced. When Ponting had added just six to his tally, Virender Sehwag dropped a chance at third slip off Pathan, and when he reached 12, a close lbw decision against him off Ajit Agarkar's bowling was turned down. Overcoming these hiccups, Ponting strove on further with his innings, reaching his fifty off 64 balls, with a four off Ashish Nehra's bowling, in the 23rd over of Australia's innings. One over later, Langer joined the party, too, amassing 20 runs off Anil Kumble's sixth over with two boundaries and two sixes apiece. However, Kumble was to have the last laugh, as he trapped Langer, who nevertheless, made a dominating and attacking 58 from a mere 72 deliveries in the fifth ball of the 26th over, when Australia were cruising along at a run-rate of above five per over. The dismissal occurred shortly before lunch, providing the Indians with a vital breakthrough, but the relief was a short one, as Langer was replaced by Martyn, who proved to be a thorn in the Indian team's flesh. Martyn seemed to be in a graceful touch from his first ball, stroking some good shots to the fence against the pace duo of Agarkar and Pathan, the latter being unable to replicate his good start with the new ball. Just when he seemed set for a big score, Martyn threw away his wicket when he chased a wide ball from Nehra to VVS Laxman. Steve Waugh the next batsman also played a few through the off-side for his 30 before he was bowled by a clever piece of bowling from Nehra. Simon Katich came in at the fall of the fourth wicket at 252, and then he proceeded to add 138 runs for the fifth wicket with Ponting. Katich started slowly, but gained momentum and proceeded to pepper shots all over the wicket once he settled down, the most memorable shot being a six of Nehra. The partnership ended in the 88th over of the Australian over of the day, when he top-edged a pull from Agarkar, only to be caught by a spectacular catch by Sehwag, who came in diving full-length and held on to the cherry with both hands.

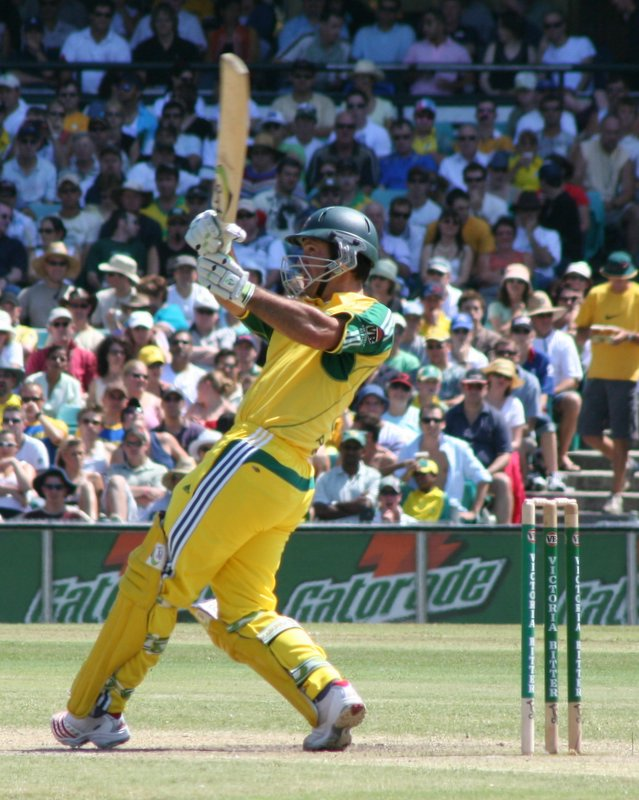
Ricky Ponting's unbeaten 176 propelled Australia to a humongous score

Australia ended the day with 400/5 from 90 overs, and Ponting was unbeaten on 176, his 19th test hundred and his fifth for the year 2003, a remarkable year for him in which he had hitherto scored 1149 runs at an average of 95.75, and had set his sights for a double century. His innings was exceptional. For his first 100 runs, he picked boundaries in the gaps on the off-side, in spite of the fact that that region was packed with fielders. He raced on to his 100 from just 117 balls, but slowed down considerably, once he reached his 150. He commented about his innings, admitting that he was satisfied with the way he played on that day. He said, "It was a good wicket, and a good outfield, and you got real value for your strokes." He commented of the Indian bowlers that, "They missed Zaheer...He's been their best bowler the past couple of years, and he bowled well up in Brisbane. They didn't bowl as well as they'd have liked today, but you can't judge them based on that." Ponting's crisp strokeplay combined with aggression to produce a fantastic knock. However, he was aided by the fact that Ganguly got rid of the 8–1 and 7–2 fields thereby depriving his bowlers the chance of getting lbws or any catches.

Second day

The second day began in an explosive fashion. While the first over of the day (bowled by Agarkar to Adam Gilchrist) yielded only 3 runs, the second over was the one that set the tone for a day which was morbidly frustrating for the bowlers and was heavily in favour of the batsmen. The second over of the day(Ashish Nehra to Gilchrist), and the 92nd over of the Australian innings fetched 12 runs. The scoring sequence was as follows: 3–0–0–1–4–4. But in the 96th over, Agarkar managed to stop the Gilchrist juggernaut when he had him to offer a catch to Sehwag for 29, made from only 24 balls. Australia, were still looking strong at 426/5 with Ponting still around for an undefeated 182. Ponting was moving sedately at a rather sluggish pace ever since he had reached 150, and seemed considerably slow before he broke off the shackles with two elegant and sweetly timed boundaries off Nehra in the 103rd over. Five balls later, Ponting brought up his double century of a mere 289 balls with another exquisite drive to the fence. When he reached his 200, he paused to blow a kiss to his wife. He had not only scored his second double century in what happened to be a prolific year for him, but also had stitched a valuable partnership with Andy Bichel, who had scored a gutsy 19 from 45 balls before Kumble had him dismissed. The Australians, though, gave the Indian bowlers and fielders no respite, as Jason Gillespie and Ponting came together to add a partnership of 83 runs, with Gillespie making merry with 48 from 53 balls, and Ponting had already raced to 242 from 350 balls by then. However, operating in his 43rd over, Kumble first got rid of Ponting and then picked up the remaining two Australian wickets off the last two balls of that over as well. This put a huge dent on the Australian hopes of making a 600-plus score.

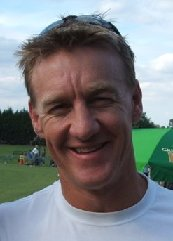
Andy Bichel made up for a poor game in Brisbane to take three wickets of the strong Indian top-order

The Indian innings started modestly, with only a total of two boundaries coming off the blades of the two openers, Sehwag and Chopra, but then in the eighth over, with the scorecard reading 30 for no loss, they cracked two fours off a Gillespie over and took 11 runs off it. In the ninth over, they handed out the same treatment to Bichel as well, carting him for 13 runs to bring a fifty-run partnership from just 9.4 overs. India's first 10 overs yielded 54 runs. But in the fifth and last ball of the eleventh over, Bichel, who was a controversial selection after a poor game in Brisbane, bowled to a straight, canny field by Waugh, and ended Chopra's 27-run stay with an innocuous half-volley, which Chopra drove uppishly towards the bowler. Bichel showed wonderful athleticism in holding on to a low return catch, breaking the 66-run partnership. Later, in the 15th over, by which time Sehwag had already bludgeoned 47 from 41 balls, Bichel "outfoxed" Sehwag with a legcutter which bounced more than expected, resulting in a fatal edge from Sehwag, which was held onto by Hayden (81/2). Sachin Tendulkar, yet to score a run in the series after his ill-fated duck at the Gabba, was distinctly ill at-ease, and was almost run out by Langer. He made a solitary run before getting out to Bichel, whose third wicket reduced the Indians to 83/3. Sourav Ganguly, man of the match in the previous test was the next batsman, but he could hardly do anything to stop the run-glut. He scratched his way to 2, before he was run out, leaving the Indian team reeling at 85/4. VVS Laxman the next man walked in.

Their partnership required 13 balls to open its account, but then on, Dravid and Laxman frustrated the Australian bowlers with their patience, eschewing any risks by leaving all the good balls. Dravid displayed some amazing shots early on in the partnership. A textbook cover-drive, which in Ravi Shastri's opinion, had "good balance", then at 95/4, in the 25th over he hit two consecutive boundaries off Bichel, the former being a whiplash pull, while the latter was an on-drive which he played down the ground, while moving his feet well. Harsha Bhogle opined on air that, "That is a superb shot! We have seen two shots of high-quality in this innings, in this over, rather. This was even better than that pull shot, this was shot of great class and grace..."

While Laxman, on the other hand, used his wrists diligently to even flick balls that were well outside off, to legside boundaries. In the first ball of the 30th over, Laxman unfurled a cover-drive off a Jason Gillespie good-length delivery. This shot too earned Bhogle's acclaim. He commented, "Beautiful Shot!", while another commentator remarked that, "That was both languid and imperious...That shot, was the shot of a class batsman." In the fortieth over, MacGill bowled an off-break to Laxman, which turned sharply in, but Laxman played an inside-out shot by unfurling the "full-face" of the bat. In the last ball of the 48th over, Laxman reached his fifty by guiding a delivery from Andy Bichel past point for a four. He reached his fifty off 95 balls. Ravi Shastri commended his effort, stating that he came played "extremely well" for a "fine innings" under pressure. India ended the day at 180/4 from 51 overs, with the Dravid-Laxman pair putting on 95 runs for the fifth wicket from 29.3 overs. The duo batted well, without giving the Australians too many chances. The closest Australia came to a wicket was through another run-out chance, when Katich missed a direct hit which would have found Laxman well short of the crease.

Third day

The third day of play had bright and sunny weather, and the pitch remained an excellent one for batting. The pair of Dravid and Laxman began in a circumspect fashion, adding only 28 runs in 17 overs, a period in which the only noteworthy accomplishment made by either sides was Dravid's half-century, which he reached with a front-foot flick to square leg off Stuart MacGill's bowling in the penultimate ball of the 59th over. Not long afterward, in the 65th over, Dravid hit the first boundary of the morning by flicking a loose, low full-toss drifting towards leg-side from MacGill. VVS Laxman, facing the first ball after the drinks break, from Andy Bichel, was dropped by Ricky Ponting when he was batting on 65. The ball was short and nicely dug in, but Laxman tilted the face of the bat at an unusual angle, getting a thick edge towards slips, where Ponting dived full to his left, but was unable to latch on to the ball. Australia would go on to regret this mistake. Sunil Gavaskar noted that Laxman would have a sudden lapse of concentration after prolonged periods of good batting. The two batsmen grew in confidence, however, and they began to bat a little more freely, with Dravid driving every ball in the off-stump line towards extra cover or cover for a boundary, while Laxman use his wristy strokeplay and his good footwork to negotiate the odd ball which kept low, and often dragging off-stump deliveries towards leg-side. This was reminiscent of the way he handled Shane Warne in 2000–01 at Eden, where he hit 281 and along with Dravid, staged a comeback to give India a famous victory. At Lunch, India were securely placed at 252/4 from 83 overs. After lunch, the two batsmen began to stroke boundaries at will, going at a rate of a four every over for the first five overs after lunch, with the highlight of that passage of play being Dravid's century. He miscued a pull from Gillespie's short ball, but had hit it hard enough for it go over the backward-square leg ropes for a six. Then Laxman reached his century as well, in the 89th over, with a single towards mid-wicket, his sixth in tests and his third against Australia, the earlier two being 167 and 281.

The two Indians continued to torment the Australians, with some risk-free but effective strokeplay, which fetched them boundaries. The only time in which the partnership saw an unorthodox shot was when Dravid dispatched a Stuart MacGill ball straight back over the bowler's head for a four by lashing at it hard and straight in the 106th over, when India were at 340/4. 4.4 overs later, Dravid's wristy flick off his hips brought him his 150, his seventh score of 150+ in tests at that time. Then, just when it seemed that Australia had to resign themselves to a long day, at 376/4 from 112.4 overs Laxman flashed a short and slightly wide delivery from Andy Bichel towards slips, where Ricky Ponting could not get his hands on the ball, and it went away through third man for a four. Later, when the score stood at 384/4, and the partnership was already 299, Laxman produced a classical drive with good timing, and good placement through extra cover to bring up the 300 for the partnership off 563 balls. As a respite for the Australians, on the last ball before tea, Laxman again decide to cut a good, rising delivery from Bichel, but managed to get an edge to Gilchrist, who had to stretch a little to take an impressive catch.

He had faced 282 balls for an elegant 148, which featured 18 fours. His innings was full of orthodox and stylish shots, notable of which were his cover drives through mid-off and extra cover, which saw him open the full face of the bat without an exaggerated follow-through. He leaned in on his drives for the spinners, while he played close to the body for the pacers, with little or no bending of his back. He moved his feet well, and used his wrists to play the ball fine, whenever the ball would stray down to middle-and-leg line. He would also flick the deliveries with no effort at all. For the off-side deliveries, Laxman would either utilize the ball's pace and send it scorching to the boundary, or he would open the face of the bat late enough to cut it. On some occasions he back-cut the ball intentionally over the slips. His innings was even appreciated by the Australian fielders. On one occasion, when Laxman drove Stuart MacGill through cover, Adam Gilchrist, exclaimed, "Aw, nice..." and then clapped his hands in acknowledgment of the shot, as it sped away to the boundary.

By the time they had been separated, the duo had already broken several records. When Dravid hit an exemplary cover-drive to bring up the 250 of the partnership, they became the first batting pair to put on two stands excess of 250 against Australia. After their stand ended, however, Dravid felt least unperturbed and forged a partnership of 59 with the young Parthiv Patel, who played well for a composed 31, which consisted of three successive fours off MacGill, but the partnership ended when Patel drove Katich to Ponting. At 447/6, the new man Ajit Agarkar came in and Dravid stitched a stand of 22 with him and then Agarkar too departed at 469/7. Finally, with the new man Kumble, Dravid added 8 runs before the play was finished for the day. He finished the day on 199 not out, an innings which was built slowly, yet steadily. This was his first test hundred in Australia, and this was an innings which "laughed at the face of that innuendo". Sambit Bal, noted ESPNcricinfo author argued that Dravid could have completed an easy double hundred had he not refused easy runs in order to shield the lower-order batsmen. Bal also described Dravid's batting as being "picture perfect. It describes balance, poise and symmetry". Laxman and Dravid had frustrated Australia so much on that day, that their partnership seemed to be an encore of that 376 that had put on together at Kolkata in 2000–01. Laxman had scored a double century then, and Dravid seemed to be on the cusp of another one. in fact, when Ricky Ponting was asked at the end of the previous day whether Dravid and Laxman's partnership brought back memories of Kolkata 2000–01, Ponting was reported to have said, "I didn't want to think of that."

Fourth day

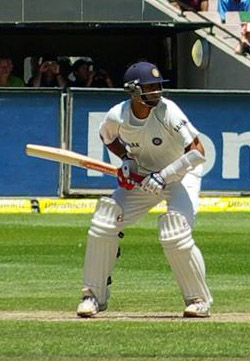
Rahul Dravid played a monumental innings full of beautiful strokes to put his team back on track. His 233 was the highest score by an Indian in Australia against Australia.

Australia's woes on the field were magnified by Laxman and Dravid's stubborn partnership on the third day, but their misery was to continue when it was discovered that one of Australia's bowlers, Brad Williams had injured his shoulder while fielding and that he would require a month to be back in action. The bad day which was to unfold for the Australians began with a square cut from Rahul Dravid on the first ball of the day from Stuart MacGill. He had taken 386 balls for the milestone. After reaching his double hundred, Dravid continue in fine nick, cover driving a ball from Gillespie to extra cover boundary for four, going past Ravi Shastri's record for the highest score in Australia against Australia by an Indian. His monumental innings-it lasted for well over 9 hours-ended when he top-edged a pull off Gillespie to Bichel, who took a good, tumbling catch.

The Indians and Australians had exploited a good batting surface, but the pitch which had rapidly worn out, aiding spinners to a large extent, because when the ball pitched on the rough and the footholds on the batsmen's end, it would turn alarmingly and would keep low as well, making it difficult for the batsmen to play some attacking shots. However, the Australian batsmen decided to tackle this situation by the mean they knew best: all-out attack.

Sure enough, the Indian bowlers got plenty of help from the pitch. However, the Australian batsmen also played a hand in their own dismissal, playing too many rash strokes. The Australians suffered their first setback, when Ajit Agarkar got Justin Langer plumb lbw in the second ball of the second over with a delivery that nipped back in. At 10/1, Ricky Ponting, Australia's first innings double centurion entered. However, he played 16 balls without opening his account before he drove straight to the hands of gully. Then the score was 18/2. Soon after, in the 15th over, (8.2 overs after the first wicket) the third wicket fell–this time, Matthew Hayden being the batsman, scooping up a drive straight to cover. Australia were soon struggling at 44/3. Then came one of the few partnerships of any substantial note in the Australian innings. Damien Martyn and Steve Waugh came together to add 65 runs for the fourth wicket. The partnership started off slowly, with only 11 runs being added in 5 overs, and then in the 21st over, Waugh broke out from the defensive shell by stroking two boundaries off Ashish Nehra's over. Thereafter, Martyn took displayed a stylish exhibition of batting with some glorious cover-drives, whereas Waugh dominated the partnership with his trademark square-drives. However, the track seemed to aid spin-even Anil Kumble's legbreaks turned a great deal-Sourav Ganguly brought on Sachin Tendulkar, and the move immediately paid off. In his third over, Tendulkar lured Damien Martyn into edging to slips, where Rahul Dravid held a superb catch. Martyn departed after a commanding 38, and then in his fourth over, he made Waugh edge a delivery to Dravid at slips. From 109/3, the Australian were suddenly in trouble at 112/5.

In came Gilchrist, and he began playing with his usual aggression, hitting Tendulkar for four in just his third ball. He carried on his aggression, treating Anil Kumble with disdain, smashing him for six, and then he hit a Tendulkar delivery for six as well. He was ably assisted by Simon Katich, who played sedately, and yet tackled the spinners comfortably. Gilchrist's aggression proved a perfect foil for Katich's calm strokeplay, as they mounted a stand of 71 runs from 15 overs. However, Gilchrist, in a moment of overconfidence, moved in front of the stumps to Kumble, exposing his leg-stump, which promptly got knocked over. Australia could still have hit back from 183/6, but then their tail succumbed to Ajit Agarkar, whose only claim to fame in his 18 test matches till then was the sobriquet of 'Bombay Duck', which was bestowed upon him for scoring seven ducks on the trot against Australia. Agarkar, came back for a new spell of 4 overs, in which he picked up a wicket off every over. He used the short ball judiciously and sparingly, and this tactic nailed the well-set Simon Katich, who had played a patient and a disciplined innings. For the tailenders, Agarkar bowled good-length deliveries on a consistent basis, which lured them to play aggressively, and as a result, Australia suffered. His spell with the old ball, was almost as good as the new ball, with which he "confounded" Matthew Hayden with the swing, and dismissed the two first innings accumulators, Ponting and Langer. Those four overs yielded only 13 runs, and Australia were bowled out for 196, while Agarkar picked up 6/41 from 16.2 overs.

The Indians were thus left with a target of 230, and there were still ten overs left in the day, but the Indian openers survived all of these overs without any scare. Virender Sehwag played aggressively, hitting a couple of boundaries off the fast bowlers, while he also hit Stuart MacGill's first ball for four to midwicket. Chopra also played patiently and showed no sign of nerves, cover driving Bracken and Gillespie with some good timing. They ended the day on 37 for no loss, with 193 runs still left to get after what seemed like an enthralling day of play

Later, John Buchanan, then the coach of Australia, admitted that Australia's batting did not show any application. He stated that "There are days when teams will get bowled out for 196 if the conditions favour bowlers and the bowling is exceptional. Sadly, we can't offer those excuses today.

"We always look to play aggressive cricket. It's part of our batting philosophy, we try to score off as many balls as possible. That's how we have been successful. But some of the shot selection from our top six batsmen was not good enough today. The Indian bowlers bowled in the right areas, give them credit for that. But our batting performance was immature."

He also remarked that he rather wanted the Australians to bat like Dravid and Laxman. However, he expressed his hope in the Australian team to win the match irrespective of the situation, stating that last day pitches are always difficult to play out, more so in this case, because he suggested that the pitch had some dust and would turn more the next day.

Fifth day

India entered the final day with ten wickets in hand and a further 193 runs to get. Should they win the match, it would be their first in Australian soil in 23 years, moreover such a result would mean that the Australians would have lost their first home test match in five years. As the openers walked out on a bright and sunny morning. The morning sessions was intense and tension-filled, as the Australian bowlers, led by Gillespie, did not let the opening pair to settle down as they did the previous morning. The opening pair only added 11 runs to the score in five overs, before Gillespie nailed Chopra when the score was 48. Dravid, the next man in, was welcomed with a tremendous round of applause from the Australian crowd. However, the welcome he received from the Australian bowlers was less than warm. When he was batting on 9, Dravid edged a delivery in the offstump line from the injured Brad Williams to Gilchrist, who could not take a low and difficult chance. However, Dravid was once again given a thorough working over from Williams. The reprieve would ultimately prove to be costly. Had the wicket fallen, it would have been 73/2, but the second wicket did not get delayed much after that drop. Virender Sehwag had smashed a four off Stuart MacGill, but almost immediately, a couple of balls later, he got out MacGill, who dropped in a well-flighted delivery, luring Sehwag to step put of the crease and have a go at it, which resulted in his stumping. Then the score was 79/2. Sachin Tendulkar, coming at the fall of the second wicket was under immense pressure as he had only scored a meagre 171 runs at an average of 19 in five tests that he played since December 2002. His sequence of scores in those tests were:8, 51, 9, 32, 8, 7, 55, 1, 0 and 1. However, in this innings, Tendulkar started well, starting with a paddle-sweep for four of MacGill, and then he played some handsome cover-drives and unleashed his pulls whenever the bowlers seemed to have erred in line and length. He played patiently as well, not allowing the momentum to drop, but also not allowing aggression to get the better of him. His running was also prolific, as he ran three runs and on one occasion, he even ran four runs. Dravid, on the other end, played slowly and assuredly, with his runs coming mainly from solid batting rather than aggressive or flamboyant strokeplay. The duo added 50 runs within a span of 14.2 overs, when Dravid scored two runs off a delivery from Steve Waugh. Brad Williams came back for a second spell and tested the two batsmen severely with his reverse swing and limited pace. The partnership blossomed to 70, and just when it seemed that the two would bat Australia out of the game, Stuart MacGill struck with Tendulkar's wicket in the 47th over. MacGill, who had been until then, bowling from round the wicket, changed the angle and Tendulkar, failing to read a straighter one which pitched on middle-and-leg, offered no stroke and was given out lbw for a 59-ball 37, and the score was 149/3. Sourav Ganguly joined Dravid in the middle. The two added 21 runs from 9 overs before Ganguly was dismissed by Andy Bichel for 12, scooping a drive straight to Simon Katich. At 170/4, India required 60 runs more and Australia were smelling blood, and were back into the contest. Laxman walked out once again, to join Dravid, and he swung back the momentum of the match promptly. After scoring his first run off his first ball, Laxman was back on strike in the 57th over. He dead-batted the first two balls, but he caressed the third ball through covers, a full toss (by MacGill) to the boundary. When MacGill repeated that the next ball, Laxman sent it back to the midwicket boundary. Then he cut the last ball to the point boundary, taking 12 runs from the over. The next over, Dravid reached a well-deserved fifty from 129 balls, with a four off Andy Bichel. Thus, he completed the distinction of being the only man to reach two fifty-plus scores in the match. Dravid too, grew in confidence, and began to repeat his partner's exploits. Soon after the two had added 51 from 11 overs, Laxman was dismissed playing a rash stroke, mistiming a hoick off Katich to Bichel, but the match was already lost by then and at 221/4, India needed only 9 runs to clinch the match. Parthiv Patel delayed the moment, getting bowled around the legs by Katich, but it brought together India's two heroes with the bat and ball, Rahul Dravid and Ajit Agarkar to the crease. In the fourth ball of the 72nd over and with the score on 229/6, Dravid played a square cut, which went away to the boundary, and as he ran, he let out a roar and pumped his fist. Then he took off his cap and kissed the India crest on it. Steve Waugh, in a brave act of sportsmanship, gave Dravid the ball which he had cut for four, saying "Well Played."

=== 3rd Test ===
26-30 Dec 2003
Scorecard

India	v	Australia
366 (103 overs); V Sehwag 195; Rahul Dravid 49; Stuart MacGill 3/70 (15 overs); Brett Lee 2/103 (27 overs)		558 (151.2 overs); Ricky Ponting 257; Matthew Hayden 136; Anil Kumble 6/176 (51 overs); Ajit Agarkar 3/115 (33.2 overs)
286 (99.5 overs); Rahul Dravid 92; Sourav Ganguly 73; Nathan Bracken 2/45 (25 overs); Brad Williams 4/53 (22 overs)		97/1 (22.2 overs); Matthew Hayden 53*; Ricky Ponting 31*; Ajit Agarkar 1/25 (7 overs)

Australia won by 9 wickets
MCG, Melbourne, Victoria
Umpires: David Shepherd, Billy Bowden
Player of the match: Ricky Ponting

- India won the toss and chose to bat

Match report

First day

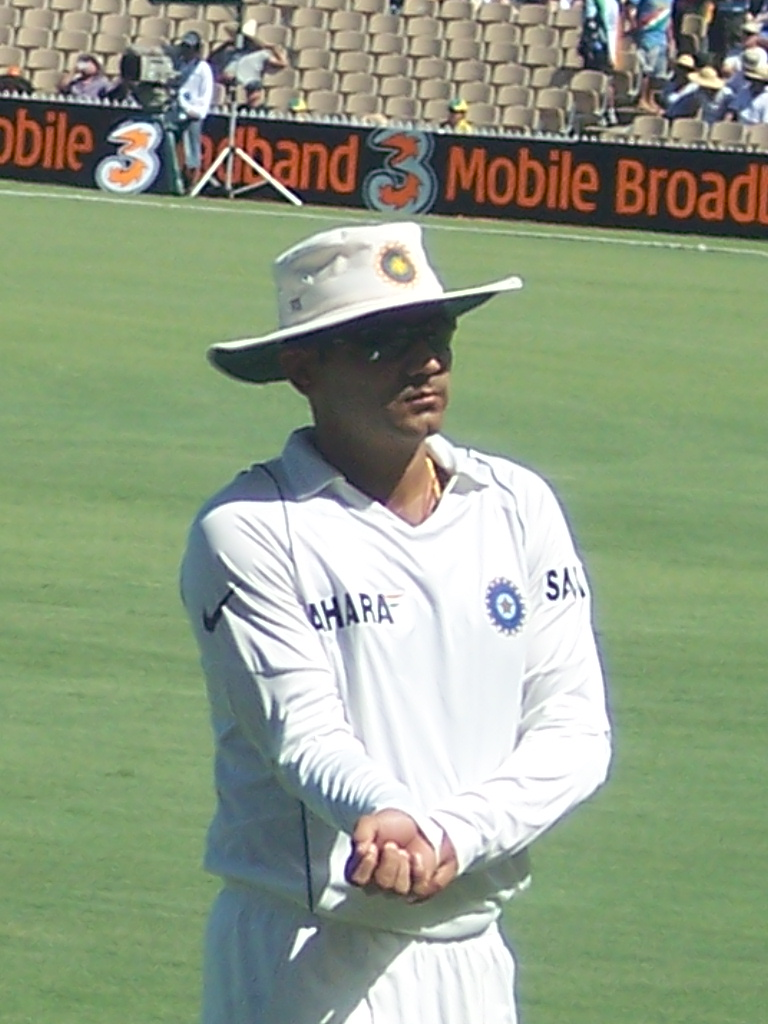
Sehwag gave a commanding and dominant display of batting at the MCG on Boxing Day

The match at Melbourne was crucial for Australia, as they had to pull back the advantage and had to squeeze a win for Steve Waugh, who, incidentally was playing his last match in the ground where he had made his debut nineteen years ago, in 1985, and even more coincidentally, against the same opponents.

Ganguly, the Indian captain won the toss and chose to bat first. The Indian openers justified his choice by playing some watchful cricket in the first hour, which produced less than thirty runs. Virender Sehwag was particularly watchful, and at one stage, had made only 16 runs from 53 balls. The two openers also played out three successive maidens within this period. However, by lunch, they made 89 for no loss, and by then Sehwag had completed his fifty from 78 balls, with eight fours and one six, the latter being swung away inside-out above extra cover into the stands, off MacGill.

Sehwag's innings was ably assisted by his Delhi team-mate, Akash Chopra, who was cautious and defensive. His vigil was watchful, and he played the perfect foil to his partner, complementing Sehwag's brisk strokeplay with his defensive approach. He did have his moments of aggression, though, the most notable of them being the successive boundaries he hit off Brett Lee in an over which was put away for 18 runs.

Brett Lee had dominated the clash between himself and Sehwag for some brief moments when he hit Sehwag on the helmet twice, with just-short of a length deliveries each time. Sehwag also enjoyed a slice of luck, when a comedy of errors by the Australian fielders resulted in a run-out chance being put down. Sehwag had just struck a ball off Lee on the off-side, and had run a single, and had made his mind to go for the second, but a moment's hesitation, left him in the middle of the pitch and when the fielder threw the ball to Lee, the bowler, Sehwag was a few yards away from the crease. Unmindful of this, Lee threw the ball to the batting end, where Chopra was struggling to get to. The wicketkeeper, however, dropped the ball, only for Chopra to make it back to the crease in time.

After his reprieve, Sehwag batted in a much more watchful manner, playing with discipline, not employing any ugly slogs, and playing only "ground shots". Against the fast bowlers, he used his back foot well, cutting or late-cutting the ball through gully, albeit sometimes with some risks, as he was almost caught by a diving Langer at third slip.

After Chopra fell, with the score on 141/1, Rahul Dravid joined Sehwag in the middle and the pair cruised along steadily, and by the end of the 50th over, they had added 28 runs from 7 overs, with Sehwag having completed a hundred and Dravid having scored 9. Sehwag completed his hundred with a neatly timed, and powerful drive through midwicket for four, from just 144 balls. He had by that time, 16 boundaries and a six to his credit.

Upon reaching his hundred, Sehwag did not do anything excessive, by his standards, instead, lofted MacGill for six and then continued his belligerent display by hitting Brad Williams for two fours and then, in the last over before tea, which was bowled by Waugh, Sehwag clubbed a six to move to 130 from 170 balls, complete with nineteen boundaries and two sixes. Australia were sloppy, as Sehwag's knock could have been nipped in the bud, had it not been for the missed run-out chance and a dropped catch when he was on 66. Mike Coward, writing for Wisden's test match report, commented on the aggressiveness in Sehwag's innings. He wrote,

"Elite Indian batsmen have often been noted for their quiet demeanour and inscrutability, but Sehwag is representative of a new breed who boast a self-assuredness, even cockiness. A daring opener, he has a simple philosophy and an uncomplicated style, playing by instinct and not by the book. "

Post tea-break, Sehwag and Dravid steadied the Indian innings further and carried forward to 278/1 along with Dravid, who, having come off 305 runs in Adelaide, had made a patient 49 from 89 balls with 5 boundaries. Steve Waugh gave himself an extended bowling spell, and against the run of play, produced a delivery which was well outside leg-stump, but Dravid aimed a shot to Damien Martyn at forward square leg, and it appeared that Dravid, who had faced a lot of short deliveries from Waugh, had not anticipated this delivery. Dravid's dismissal apparently did not hamper Sehwag's rapid progress, as he whipped a delivery to square-leg boundary with a flourish, off Brad Williams in the next over after the second wicket. However, Tendulkar was soon dismissed by Lee, trying to work a delivery in the legside fine. He was the third wicket to fall at 286/3. The Indian captain, Sourav Ganguly walked into the middle to join Sehwag, whose response to the two quick wickets was to just smash a MacGill delivery next over for a six above midwicket. However, Sehwag's approach hastened his end, as he was out in the 78th over, bowled by Simon Katich, the next ball after he had hit a six.

Sehwag's "buccaneer" spirit was praised much by Dileep Premachandran, who asserted that his 195 would be considered as one of the finest ever innings played in the opening day of a test match. His back foot play off the fast bowlers, and his audacious and apparently murderous strokeplay against the spinners impressed Premachandran, who wrote in the same article,

He(Sehwag) came to Australia with a reputation of weakness against the short ball. It tested his character today, and it didn't break him. After the first hour, his strokeplay was what we have known it to be: audacious, inventive and always breathtaking. He cut and straight-drove the fast bowlers, smote and murdered the spinners and when Steve Waugh tried to fox him with a slower one, he deposited him over long-off.

Sehwag also brought out the best in Akash Chopra, who was just playing in his fifth test, and together, they had amassed 141 for the first wicket, which was the first partnership outside the subcontinent in nearly ten years. This was a contrast from the opening partnerships that had been put on in the 1999–00 series, the previous instance when India visited Australia. Then the opening partnerships read: 7 and 0, 11 and 5, and 10 and 22. In this series, the partnerships were: 61 and 4, 66 and 48, 141. His style of play was termed to be an aberration from the way how other elite Indian batsmen used to play–with a quiet demanour and inscrutability. His innings was praised to be one of raw courage and daring.

After Sehwag's exit, VVS Laxman came out to join his captain, Ganguly. The pair weathered a testing and hostile spell from Brett Lee with the second new ball in a session of play which almost saw the fifth wicket fall when Ganguly spooned back a catch to Lee, only for the bowler to put it down. The pair added valuable runs for India, with Ganguly ending on 20 and Laxman on 6. India ended the day on 329/4, having cause for satisfaction. After the day's play closed, Sehwag termed the innings as his best, "Coming to Australia, and making runs ... it has to be my best," he said about his knock, which threatened to put Australia out of contention.

Second day

The second day saw India make a heavy string of mistakes which cost them dearly. Coming in at 329/4, with Ganguly and Laxman both looking good for better scores, India began the day's play with much more confidence than their opponents. India did begin brightly, after Ganguly unfurled some glorious strokes against Nathan Bracken and Lee. However, in the 95th over bowled by Lee, which lasted 8 balls, courtesy of three no-balls from the bowler, Ganguly's weakness against fast-bowlers resurfaced as he popped a short-of-length ball to gully after knocking Lee for two fours, becoming the fifth wicket to fall, for 350. Thereafter, India completely lost their way. Poor judgment from the lower-order batsmen and Laxman's dismissal for 19 contributed to India's spectacular demise, as the last 6 wickets fell for 16 runs.

After ending India's chances of posting a huge total, Australia, having the perfect chance to post a good total, lost their first wicket before lunch, when Agarkar dismissed Langer for 14–for the fourth time in the series–with the score reading 30/1. The next man, Ponting and Hayden, though gave no quarter for India, as they piled up the runs. India's best bowler in the first test at Gabba, Zaheer Khan, who had returned from a hamstring injury, put up a lacklustre bowling effort, due to the after-effects of the injury.

Of the two batsmen, Hayden was the most prolific. He reached the 50-run mark from 71 balls with a single off Khan in the 27th over. Ponting followed him, not too long after, reaching his fifty from 84 balls. Hayden reached his hundred off a mere 137 balls, but his knock was circumspect. He was selective about his strokeplay early on in his innings, batting cautiously against Ashish Nehra, who bowled two accurate and probing spells to him. His runs came mostly off Agarkar's and Kumble's bowling, driving the former down the ground, while slogging the latter, never allowing him to settle. He repeatedly attacked Kumble, whose figures were unimpressive–5-1-35-0. Hayden's running was equally good as well. After reaching his hundred, he broke the self-imposed shackles off, taking guard outside his crease, and dispatching even the good balls for boundaries.

Ponting, on the other hand, was content to play second fiddle to Hayden for once, scoring his hundred off 172 balls. His off-driving and punches behind square seemed to bear "a brutal stamp of efficiency of a man who has scored five centuries in a year". He dominated Zaheer Khan, and Ajit Agarkar, taking advantage of their mistakes, but his batting against Kumble was a major concern, as he did not play him with certainty or with the assuredness he displayed against other bowlers. He was lucky to survive some close chances off Kumble's bowling. After Hayden's dismissal, Ponting (120 not out at the close) and Damien Martyn saw Australia safely home to the end of the day, as India had a meagre lead of 49 by then.

Third day

After having reduced the lead to a slow margin, Australia were faced with a pitch which had deteriorated and made batting increasingly difficult. The Australian batsmen switched gears eventually after tea, from aggressive to defensive, though Ponting's second century earlier took almost 200 balls. The Indian bowlers were rewarded with Martyn's wicket in the fourth ball of the 92nd over, by which time Australia had already gained a lead of 13. At the end of the first session, Australia added 79 runs for the loss of Martyn's wicket. The second session saw some more circumspect batting, as Australia added 84 runs from the 28 overs bowled in that period, but for the loss of Simon Katich's wicket. The highlight of the second session was Ponting's double hundred, from 368 balls with a neat single off Ashish Nehra's bowling. His double hundred was described as being "magnificent" by S Rajesh, noted ESPNcricinfo statistician, "for its complete mastery over the Indian bowlers". Ponting was also dominant as he neared his double century, singling out Kumble for some punishment. His knock also continued his excellent form in the year 2003, in which he had already notched up an average excess of 100, in Tests. Another incident, a setback for Australia briefly, was Steve Waugh's decision to retire after being hurt. Waugh came out to bat to a standing ovation, but the second ball he faced, from Agarkar, was a short one to which he turned his back, turning his head towards third slip. The ball hit him on his elbow, and after a quick examination from the physio, he decided to go off. The last session made the difference, as Australia, already with a commanding 114 run lead, added 88 runs for 6 wickets, of which Anil Kumble took three. After Waugh retired hurt, Simon Katich came in and hung around, adding 64 runs for the fifth wicket with Ponting, then was out to Kumble (437/5). Steve Waugh returned at this stage, wearing an arm-guard over his hand, but he looked far from comfortable in his 19-run knock. He padded up once too many times to Kumble, which turned out to be his downfall, as he lost his wicket that way (502/6). Ponting lost the tail as India steadily worked their way through the match, with some perseverance from Kumble. Ponting was stumped off Kumble, at 555/9, after missing an attempted heave. Ponting's 468-ball innings was termed as "restrained" and "mature", and had less aggression or flamboyance compared to his double century at Adelaide. His approach towards batting was similar to that of Rahul Dravid's in Adelaide: he was in command of his shots and the bowlers, so he had to occupy the crease for a long time. An important aspect of Ponting's knock which stood out was his footwork: he scored at a rate of 1.5 off the front-foot, but scored at a pace of 5.4 from the back-foot. He remarkably remained in control for 87% of the balls he faced from other Indian bowlers, except Kumble, against whom he had a lower in-control percentage of 81%. Sambit Bal noted that despite being uncomfortable against Ashish Nehra and Ajit Agarkar early on, Ponting played an innings of ambition. He added,

He is, by no stretch of imagination, an austere batsman, but the reckless ostentatiousness has been curbed, and a matured aggression has emerged. The Ponting of old was consumed by the fire within, and wouldn't yield to the voices of sense and reason. It brought about his demise against Harbhajan Singh in India in 2001 when he was hell-bent on sweeping when the circumstances demanded a safer method. The fire hasn't been completely doused, but it comes in measured bursts now rather than in an uncontrolled stream, and the civilised Ponting has been a far more dangerous batsman in the last 18 months than during any other time in his career.

Of the seven Australian wickets to fall, Kumble took four and had figures of 27–6–74–4. Overall, Kumble took 51–8–176–6. His bowling effort was termed "lionhearted" according to noted journalist Soumya Bhattacharya, he "bowled with great heart and skill...but also with great skill and guile in an overseas test match." Bhattacharya also commented upon the change of Kumble's stock ball, the googly, which he believed now was a wicket-taking weapon that can not only turn to the right hander, but also bounces.

After Australia's innings ended for 558, the Indian openers had a task of batting out 11 overs more. But they lost their way soon. Aakash Chopra lost his wicket to Nathan Bracken, wrongly adjudged caught behind when the ball had only brushed his pads. Sehwag also got out, offering a catch, flicking Lee uppishly. Rahul Dravid and Sourav Ganguly(who came in place of Sachin Tendulkar) carried them through to the end of the day without any major mishaps, ending on 6 not out each respectively.

Fourth day

India started the fourth room facing a daunting situation. Dravid and Ganguly gave India a quiet start, adding only 11 runs in the first five overs, but in the third ball of the fifteenth over, Ganguly received a blow on the back of the head from Brad Williams, and had to retire. At this point, Sachin Tendulkar came in, and along with Rahul Dravid, rescued India from doldrums. India were 109/2 at lunch, as the two batsmen applied themselves on a wearing pitch with uneven bounce. After lunch, Tendulkar began confidently, playing some good shots off Brett Lee and Brad Williams, before getting out to Williams, attempting to play a wide delivery from him. He had, by then, made his highest score in the series, 44, and a poor year personally in terms of form for him, ended. His knock was described as being "diligent in protecting(his)wicket and resisting temptation". Then the score was 126/3. From that point onwards, Australia executed their tactics well enough and did not employ over-attacking fields for VVS Laxman, the next batsman, knowing that he could score his runs freely anyhow. Laxman, in spite of being untroubled during his brief stay in the crease, got out to Stuart MacGill, getting drawn into edging a leg-break to slips. The score was 160/4 and India were still trailing by 32 runs. Ganguly came in after Laxman's dismissal, while Dravid was unbeaten at the other end on 53. The Dravid-Ganguly partnership resumed quietly, starting with a succession of three maiden overs within five overs. Ganguly, in particular, continued with his defensive style of play till tea. Just after the break, Australia played Simon Katich and Stuart MacGill, and the runs continue to flow freely. The second new ball was taken after eighty overs, and by then Ganguly's strokeplay had become bolder. He reached his half-century against Brett Lee's bowling with a drive to mid-off. He reached his fifty from 106 balls with eight fours. After securing applause for his fifty, he sent the next ball racing past point for four. Against Brad Williams in the next over, Ganguly swung high over square leg for four against a short delivery, like the one which had hit him on the back of his head. Lee came steaming in the next over as well, but again, he was dispatched for four off successive balls. It was "stirring stuff, not without an element of risk in it."

Meanwhile, Dravid was a picture of calm and patience, as he played yet another important innings to turn around India's fortunes. His 92 however, lacked in the polish that was exhibited in his two knocks in Adelaide, as he played and missed sometimes. But he retained an excellent control over almost all bowlers, and played a lot of dot balls, and put away the bad deliveries for the boundaries, explaining his high boundary rate. Dravid was dismissed by Lee, edging a delivery to Adam Gilchrist behind the stumps. Dravid was dismissed when the score was 253, and was the fifth man out. After his dismissal for a gritty 92, the Indian innings came to an end rather rapidly, as only a further 33 runs were added for the loss of five wickets, including that of Ganguly's who was dismissed for 73. Brad Williams turned out to be the chief destroyer of the Indian innings with a haul of 4 wickets, and constantly troubled Ganguly. Williams, who was a surprise pick over Andy Bichel, expressed his joy on being able to scalp four against the Indian batting order. He also praised Dravid for his batting. Dravid himself commented that it had been an uphill struggle for most of the day, "It was never comfortable. When me and Sourav were going well, there was a bit of hope. But to be honest, we needed something special to happen, an Eden Gardens or an Adelaide. And those things don't happen everyday.". India's spectacular collapse left Australia needing only 95 runs for a victory.

Fifth day

In pursuit of an easy target of 95 and a series-levelling win, Australia lost the wicket of Langer, who was dismissed by Ajit Agarkar, but the fall of the first wicket brought together Ricky Ponting and Matthew Hayden. Together, the two took Australia to a safe victory, levelling the series with one more match to go.

=== 4th Test ===
2-6 Jan 2004
Scorecard

India	v	Australia
705/7 (187.3 overs); Sachin Tendulkar 241*; VVS Laxman 178; Brett Lee 4/201 (39.3 overs); JN Gillespie 3/135(45 overs)		474 (117.5 overs); Simon Katich 125; Justin Langer 117; Anil Kumble 8/141 (46.5 overs); IK Pathan 2/80 (26 overs)
211/2 (43.2 overs); Rahul Dravid 91*; Sachin Tendulkar 60*; JN Gillespie 1/32 (7 overs); Stuart MacGill 1/65 (16 overs)		357/6 (94 overs); SR Waugh 80; Simon Katich 77*; Anil Kumble 4/138 (42 overs); IK Pathan 1/26 (8 overs)

Match drawn
SCG, Moore Park, Sydney
Umpires: Steve Bucknor, Billy Bowden
Player of the match: Sachin Tendulkar

- India won the toss and chose to bat

Match report

First day

With both the teams level on one win each, the final and fourth test match was critical to both the teams' ambitions. Sourav Ganguly won the toss and elected to bat first on a good, bouncy pitch. The Indian openers, Sehwag and Chopra added 98 runs for the first wicket before lunch. Sehwag and Chopra stitched the runs with a definite uncertainty, as they were troubled by the swing and seam movement generated by Brett Lee and Jason Gillespie, the latter coming off an injury. The openers played and missed frequently, as Brett Lee looked like taking a wicket.

Lee almost created a breakthrough for Australia, as he had Chopra caught off a no-ball once and off the next ball, he had Chopra edge to the gully, only to have Simon Katich drop the chance. This proved to be a turning point for Lee, as Sehwag snatched 18 runs off him, a couple of overs later.

After that over, both the openers looked more settled, as Chopra began to select his shots confidently and fortuitously, while Sehwag recklessly began to hit the ball, but did not overdo his hitting spree. Just when Sehwag seemed set for another big innings, he edged a good-length ball from Gillespie after lunch, and was caught behind for 72 (123 for 1).

A short while after, Lee earned Chopra's wicket by delivering a yorker to him, after softening him with a bouncer. Chopra fell on 45, and the score was 128/2. Rahul Dravid and Sachin Tendulkar were at the crease then.

Tendulkar, who had come under scrutiny for his below-par performances, began to play a solid innings, but a compact one with no uppish shots. He laced his innings with some expansive drives, and collected his boundaries with minimum risk. Rahul Dravid, at the other end, was unyielding in his response to the bowling. He was solid as well, and he was "fluid" often outscoring Tendulkar in their partnership. He selected Stuart MacGill for some severe punishment.
