= English cricket team in Australia in 2002–03 =

2002–03 Ashes series
- Date: 7 November 2002 – 6 January 2003
- Location: Australia
- Result: Australia won the five-Test series 4–1
- Player of the series: Michael Vaughan (Eng)
Teams
- Australia: England
Captains
- Steve Waugh: Nasser Hussain
Most runs
- Matthew Hayden (496): Michael Vaughan (633)
Most wickets
- Jason Gillespie (20): Andy Caddick (20)

The England cricket team toured Australia in 2002–03, playing a five-Test series for The Ashes against the Australia national team and a number of tour matches against Australian domestic teams. They also played a triangular ODI series against Australia and Sri Lanka. The first Test of the series, at Brisbane, was the 800th Test match to be played by England.

Australia comfortably won the Test series 4–1 and retained the Ashes, which were in their possession since 1989. The player of the series was Michael Vaughan from England.

== Tour matches ==
=== England XI v ACB Chairman's XI ===
22 October 2002
Scorecard

ACB Chairman's XI; 301/7 (50 overs)	v	England XI; 243 (48.5 overs)
Kade Harvey 114 (88); Ashley Giles 3/56 (10 overs)		Rob Key 68 (71); Brad Hogg 5/33 (8.5 overs)

ACB Chairman's XI won by 58 runs
Lilac Hill, Perth
Umpires: Bruce Bennett (Aus) and Andrew Craig (Aus)
Player of the match: Kade Harvey (ACB XI)

=== England XI v Western Australia ===
24–25 October 2002
Scorecard

England XI	v	Western Australia
221 (87.2 overs); Andy Caddick 62 (78); Callum Thorp 4/58 (20 overs)		313/6 (90 overs); Shaun Marsh 92 (134); Matthew Hoggard 2/49 (15 overs)

Match drawn
WACA Ground, Perth
Umpires: Andrew Craig (Aus) and Ian Lock (Eng)

- Western Australia won the toss and elected to field.

=== England XI v Western Australia ===
28–30 October 2002
Scorecard

Western Australia	v	England XI
213 (65.5 overs); Marcus North 71 (124); Andy Caddick 4/49 (19.5 overs)		327 (102.5 overs); Nasser Hussain 117 (220); Matthew Nicholson 6/79 (19.5 overs)
248 (74.2 overs); Chris Rogers 86 (151); Simon Jones 5/78 (19 overs)		130/5 (20 overs); Rob Key 59 (48); Brad Hogg 2/26 (4 overs)

Match drawn
WACA Ground, Perth
Umpires: Ian Lock (Eng) and Richard Patterson (Aus)

- England XI won the toss and elected to field.

=== England XI v Queensland ===
2–4 November 2002
Scorecard

Queensland	v	England XI
582 (158 overs); Martin Love 250 (414); Ashley Giles 3/124 (40 overs)		322/7 (102 overs); Michael Vaughan 127 (204); Nathan Hauritz 3/48 (24 overs)

Match drawn
Allan Border Field, Brisbane
Umpires: Dave Orchard (SA) and Peter Parker (Aus)

- Queensland won the toss and elected to bat.

=== England XI v Australia A, 15–18 November 2002 ===
15–17 November 2002
Scorecard

Australia A	v	England XI
353/3d (75 overs); Martin Love 201 (243); Craig White 1/70 (14 overs)		183 (70.2 overs); John Crawley 43* (125); Brad Williams 5/52 (18.2 overs)
		310/5d (128 overs) (f/o); Rob Key 174* (386); Nathan Hauritz 2/75 (40.0 overs)

Match drawn
Bellerive Oval, Hobart
Umpires: Bob Parry (Aus) and John Smeaton (Aus)
Player of the match: Martin Love (Aus-A)

- England XI won the toss and elected to field.

=== England XI v New South Wales, 6 December 2002 ===
6 December 2002
Scorecard

England XI; 206 (49.2 overs)	v	New South Wales; 211/2 (42 overs)
Ronnie Irani 81 (120); Simon Katich 3/46 (10 overs)		Michael Slater 115 (136); Steve Harmison 1/42 (6 overs)

New South Wales won by 8 wickets
Sydney Cricket Ground, Sydney
Umpires: Nick Fowler (Aus) and Simon Taufel (Aus)

- England XI won the toss and elected to field.

=== England XI v Australia A, 8 December 2002 ===
8 December 2002
Scorecard

Australia A 205/9 (50 overs)	v	England XI; 182 (47 overs)
Justin Langer 62 (103); Ronnie Irani 3/30 (10 overs)		Ronnie Irani 33 (22); Brad Hogg 3/32 (10 overs)

Australia A won by 23 runs
Sydney Cricket Ground, Sydney
Umpires: Peter Parker (Aus) and Simon Taufel (Aus)
Player of the match: Ronnie Irani (Eng XI)

- Australia A won the toss and elected to bat.

=== England XI v Prime Minister's XI, 10 December 2002 ===
10 December 2002
Scorecard

England XI; 152 (40.4 overs)	v	Prime Minister's XI; 153/6 (31.4 overs)
Chris Read 33* (43); Mick Lewis 3/22 (8.4 overs)		Lee Carseldine 46 (60); James Kirtley 3/27 (6 overs)

Prime Minister's XI won by 4 wickets
Manuka Oval, Canberra
Umpires: Graeme Clifton (Aus) and Bruce Oxenford (Aus)
Player of the match: Lee Carseldine (PM's XI)

- England XI won the toss and elected to bat.

=== England XI v Sir Donald Bradman XI, 8 January 2003 ===
8 January 2003
Scorecard

England XI; 279/8 (50 overs)	v	Sir Donald Bradman XI; 285/4 (46.3 overs)
Owais Shah 127 (154); Greg Mail 2/11 (3 overs)		Mark Waugh 108* (99); Matthew Hoggard 2/60 (10 overs)

Sir Donald Bradman XI won by 6 wickets
Bradman Oval, Bowral
Umpires: KJ Burke (Aus) and Terry Keel (Aus)

- Sir Donald Bradman XI won the toss and elected to field.

== The Ashes series ==
=== 1st Test ===
7–10 November 2002
Scorecard

Australia	v	England
492 (130.2 overs); Matthew Hayden 197 (268); Ashley Giles 4/101 (29.2 overs)		325 (106.5 overs); Marcus Trescothick 72 (158); Glenn McGrath 4/87 (30 overs)
296/5d (71 overs); Matthew Hayden 103 (152); Andy Caddick 3/95 (23 overs)		79 (28.2 overs); Mark Butcher 40 (76); Glenn McGrath 4/36 (12 overs)

Australia won by 384 runs
The Gabba, Brisbane
Umpires: Steve Bucknor (WI) and Rudi Koertzen (SA)
Player of the match: Matthew Hayden (Aus)

- England won the toss and elected to field.

The first Test of the series began with what Wisden called "one of the costliest decisions in Test history", as England captain Nasser Hussain won the toss and chose to send Australia in to bat. Australia's batsmen took advantage of several dropped catches and other mistakes in the field to amass 364 for 2, with Ricky Ponting contributing 123 before being bowled by Ashley Giles, and Matthew Hayden finishing the day on 186 not out. England's woeful day in the field was capped by a severe injury to young bowler Simon Jones, who ruptured his anterior cruciate ligament while sliding to field a ball and was forced to withdraw from the tour.

England fought back on the second day of the Test. Hayden advanced to 197 before gloving a catch to Wicket-keeper Alec Stewart, and the Australians' last eight wickets fell for just 128 runs despite 57 from Shane Warne. Giles added three more wickets to his total and Andy Caddick took three in the day, including the captain Steve Waugh for just 7. The England batsmen then began, Marcus Trescothick and Mark Butcher sharing an unbroken century partnership to take England to 158 for 1 at stumps.

However, the Australians fought back on the third day. Butcher and Trescothick were both out early in the same over to Glenn McGrath. Hussain and John Crawley managed to stabilise the England innings and advanced to 268 for 3. However, England lost their last six wickets for 57 runs as the tail collapsed around Crawley, leaving him on 69 not out at the end of the innings. Australia started their second innings positively but lost both Justin Langer and Ponting to Caddick by the end of the day. A partnership between Hayden and Damien Martyn saw each advance to 40 not out by the close.

Australia advanced to a commanding lead on the fourth and final day, Hayden becoming only the fourth Australian to score a century in both innings of a Test match with his 103. Adam Gilchrist weighed in with 60 not out from 59 balls to take the Aussies to 296 for 5. Giles and Caddick were the only England bowlers to have any success: Giles taking the wickets of both Hayden and Ponting to finish with figures of 2 for 90 and Caddick taking 3 for 95. Waugh's declaration left England with a target of 464 runs for victory. However, England eventually finished with figures of 79 all out in 28 overs, with Mark Butcher the highest scorer at 40. Michael Vaughan departed LBW to McGrath on the third ball of the innings and Trescothick soon followed, caught at slip off Jason Gillespie. Brief partnerships between Hussain and Butcher, and then Butcher and Craig White were soon ended by McGrath (4 for 36) and Warne (3 for 29).

=== 2nd Test ===
21–24 November 2002
Scorecard

England	v	Australia
342 (115.5 overs); Michael Vaughan 177 (306); Jason Gillespie 4/78 (26.5 overs)		552/9d (139.2 overs); Ricky Ponting 154 (269); Craig White 4/106 (28 overs)
159 (59.2 overs); Alec Stewart 57 (101); Glenn McGrath 4/41 (17.2 overs)

Australia won by an innings and 51 runs
Adelaide Oval, Adelaide
Umpires: Steve Bucknor (WI) and Rudi Koertzen (SA)
Player of the match: Ricky Ponting (Aus)

- England won the toss and elected to bat.
- Play on Day 4 was reduced due to rain.

The second Test at Adelaide started much more positively for England, who had made several changes to their side, bringing in spinner Richard Dawson, Steve Harmison and Rob Key for the injured Ashley Giles, Simon Jones and John Crawley. Nasser Hussain won the toss and this time decided to bat, a decision that looked good as England advanced to 295 for 4 by the end of the day. However, this confident score was largely built around a massive 177 from Michael Vaughan, who was finally out to the last ball of the day, edging Andy Bichel to slip. No other England batsmen passed fifty, and Vaughan himself was lucky to escape dismissal on just 19 when he seemed to have been caught off Bichel by Justin Langer – TV replays proved inconclusive.

Australia took firm control of the match on the second day after a strong performance with both ball and bat. England crumbled from their strong overnight position to 342 all out, losing their last seven wickets for just 47 runs. Mark Butcher was caught behind off Jason Gillespie having added nothing to the overnight total, and England's tail was quickly dismissed by Gillespie (who finished with 4 for 78) and Warne (4 for 93). The English bowlers were next to suffer as the Australians advanced to 247 for 2 at stumps with Ricky Ponting undefeated overnight on 83. Matthew Hoggard and Andy Caddick were both smashed around the field and it was left to Craig White and Dawson to make the only breakthroughs in the afternoon, White having Matthew Hayden caught on 46 and Dawson striking to have Justin Langer caught behind on 48.

The situation worsened for England on the third day. Ponting and Damien Martyn batted through the morning session to take their overnight partnership for the third wicket to 242 before Martyn was caught off Harmison for 95 shortly after lunch, and Ponting went on to convert his overnight 83 into 154 before holing out to White. Darren Lehmann, Steve Waugh and Shane Warne fell quickly but expensively, Waugh making 34 runs from just 40 deliveries. A 77 run eighth-wicket partnership between Bichel and Adam Gilchrist off just 14 overs advanced the Aussies to a commanding 552 before Gilchrist was out miscuing a hook off Harmison and Waugh declared the innings. Needing 211 to avoid an innings defeat, England got off to a nightmare start as they collapsed to 36 for 3 by the close of play, losing Marcus Trescothick LBW to Gillespie for a duck, Butcher LBW to Glenn McGrath shortly afterwards and finally Hussain clean bowled by Bichel.

England began the fourth day hoping for rain, but despite several short delays for weather the Aussies completed the innings victory with a day to spare. Key completed a disappointing Ashes debut as he was caught at mid-wicket off Bichel for 1 in the third over of the morning, and though Vaughan and Alec Stewart looked to stabilise the innings their partnership was broken when McGrath took an impressive catch to dismiss Vaughan off the bowling of Warne. Stewart, supported by a defensive Craig White, continued to make his 41st Test half century but the two fell in successive balls to leave England in hopeless circumstances. The tail fell to leave 159 all out, McGrath taking 4 for 41 and Warne 3 for 36, giving the Aussies a crushing victory by an innings and 51 runs.

=== 3rd Test ===
29 November – 1 December 2002
Scorecard

England	v	Australia
185 (64.2 overs); Rob Key 47 (108); Brett Lee 3/78 (20 overs)		456 (99.1 overs); Damien Martyn 71 (158); Craig White 5/127 (23.1 overs)
223 (82.1 overs); Alec Stewart 66* (83); Glenn McGrath 2/24 (21 overs)

Australia won by an innings and 48 runs
WACA Ground, Perth
Umpires: Steve Bucknor (WI) and Rudi Koertzen (SA)
Player of the match: Damien Martyn (Aus)

- England won the toss and elected to bat.

=== 4th Test ===
26–30 December 2002
Scorecard

Australia	v	England
551/6d (146 overs); Justin Langer 250 (407); Craig White 3/133 (33 overs)		270 (89.3 overs); Craig White 85* (134); Jason Gillespie 4/25 (16.3 overs)
107/5 (23.1 overs); Ricky Ponting 30 (35); Andy Caddick 3/51 (12 overs)		387 (120.4 overs) (f/o); Michael Vaughan 145 (218); Stuart MacGill 5/152 (48 overs)

Australia won by 5 wickets
Melbourne Cricket Ground, Melbourne
Umpires: Dave Orchard (SA) and Russell Tiffin (Zim)
Player of the match: Justin Langer (Aus)

- Australia won the toss and elected to bat.
- Martin Love (Aus) made his Test debut.

=== 5th Test ===
2–6 January 2003
Scorecard

England	v	Australia
362 (127 overs); Mark Butcher 124 (275); Andy Bichel 3/86 (21 overs)		363 (80.3 overs); Adam Gilchrist 133 (121); Matthew Hoggard 4/92 (21.3 overs)
452/9d (125.3 overs); Michael Vaughan 183 (278); Stuart MacGill 3/120 (41 overs)		226 (54 overs); Andy Bichel 49 (58); Andy Caddick 7/94 (22 overs)

England won by 225 runs
Sydney Cricket Ground, Sydney
Umpires: Dave Orchard (SA) and Russell Tiffin (Zim)
Player of the match: Michael Vaughan (Eng)

- England won the toss and elected to bat.

== Sources ==
- Playfair Cricket Annual
- Wisden Cricketers Almanack
