= 2002–03 Australia Tri-Nation Series =

2002–03 VB Series
- Date: 13 December 2002 – 25 January 2003
- Location: Australia
- Result: Won by Australia; 2–0 in final series
Teams
Australia	England	Sri Lanka
Captains
Ricky Ponting	Nasser Hussain	Sanath Jayasuriya
Most runs
Matthew Hayden (458)	Nick Knight (461)	Sanath Jayasuriya (359)
Most wickets
Brett Lee (18)	James Anderson (13)	Dilhara Fernando (13)

The 2002–03 Australia Tri-Nation Series (more commonly known as the 2002–03 VB Series) was a One Day International (ODI) cricket tri-series where Australia played host to England and Sri Lanka. Australia and England reached the Finals, which Australia won 2–0.

== Uniforms ==
Australia A
Australia A kit

Australia
Australia kit

England
England kit

Sri Lanka
Sri Lanka kit

== Squads ==
Australia	England	Sri Lanka
Ricky Ponting (c); Michael Bevan; Andy Bichel; Nathan Bracken; Ryan Campbell; Michael Clarke; Adam Gilchrist; Jason Gillespie; Matthew Hayden; Brad Hogg; Brett Lee; Darren Lehmann; Jimmy Maher; Damien Martyn; Glenn McGrath; Shane Warne; Shane Watson; Brad Williams	Nasser Hussain (c); James Anderson; Gareth Batty; Ian Blackwell; Andy Caddick; Paul Collingwood; Andrew Flintoff; Steve Harmison; Matthew Hoggard; Ronnie Irani; James Kirtley; Nick Knight; Owais Shah; Alec Stewart; Marcus Trescothick; Michael Vaughan	Sanath Jayasuriya (c); Russel Arnold; Marvan Atapattu; Aravinda de Silva; Dilhara Fernando; Charitha Buddhika; Pulasthi Gunaratne; Avishka Gunawardene; Mahela Jayawardene; Romesh Kaluwitharana; Chamila Gamage; Jehan Mubarak; Muttiah Muralitharan; Prabath Nissanka; Thilan Samaraweera; Kumar Sangakkara; Hashan Tillakaratne; Chaminda Vaas

== Points table ==
The winning team of a match normally earned 5 points and the losing team 1 point. Each team received 3 points in the event of a no result or tied game.

A bonus point was available if the winning team scored at a run rate of at least 1.25 times the losing team. In this series however, this bonus point was also deducted from the other team, resulting in the winning team earning 6 points and the losing team zero.

The two teams with the most points at the conclusion of the series played in a best-of-three final.

Pos	Team	P	W	L	NR	T	Points	NRR
1	Australia	8	7	1	0	0	38	+0.730
2	England	8	3	5	0	0	20	−0.023
3	Sri Lanka	8	2	6	0	0	14	−0.993

== Group stage ==
=== 1st Match: Australia v England ===
13 December 2002
14:15 (D/N)
Scorecard

England; 8/251 (50 overs)	v	Australia; 3/252 (45 overs)
NV Knight 111* (133); B Lee 4/47 (8 overs)		ML Hayden 98 (92); ID Blackwell 2/38 (10 overs)

Australia won by 7 wickets
Sydney Cricket Ground, Sydney
Umpires: RE Koertzen (SA) and SJA Taufel (Aus)
Player of the match: ML Hayden (Aus)

- England won the toss and elected to bat.
- Gareth Batty (Eng) made his ODI debut.

=== 2nd Match: Australia v England ===
15 December 2002
14:15 (D/N)
Scorecard

Australia; 6/318 (50 overs)	v	England; 229 (48 overs)
AC Gilchrist 124 (104); ID Blackwell 2/54 (10 overs)		NV Knight 70 (68); B Lee 2/31 (9 overs)

Australia won by 89 runs
Melbourne Cricket Ground, Melbourne
Umpires: SA Bucknor (WI) and SJA Taufel (Aus)
Player of the match: AC Gilchrist (Aus)

- Australia won the toss and elected to bat.
- James Anderson (Eng) made his ODI debut.

=== 3rd Match: England v Sri Lanka ===
17 December 2002
13:15 (D/N)
Scorecard

England; 292 (50 overs)	v	Sri Lanka; 6/249 (50 overs)
N Hussain 79 (106); CRD Fernando 3/68 (10 overs)		DPMD Jayawardene 71 (92); SJ Harmison 2/39 (10 overs)

England won by 43 runs
The Gabba, Brisbane
Umpires: DB Hair (Aus) and RE Koertzen (SA)
Player of the match: AJ Stewart (Eng)

- England won the toss and elected to bat.
- Steve Harmison (Eng) made his ODI debut.

=== 4th Match: England v Sri Lanka ===
20 December 2002
12:15 (D/N)
Scorecard

England; 9/258 (50 overs)	v	Sri Lanka; 163 (43.4 overs)
PD Collingwood 100 (124); CRD Fernando 4/48 (10 overs)		RP Arnold 44 (82); AR Caddick 3/30 (10 overs)

England won by 95 runs
WACA Ground, Perth
Umpires: SA Bucknor (WI) and SJA Taufel (Aus)
Player of the match: PD Collingwood (Eng)

- England won the toss and elected to bat.

=== 5th Match: Australia v Sri Lanka ===
22 December 2002
12:15 (D/N)
Scorecard

Australia; 5/305 (50 overs)	v	Sri Lanka; 163 (43 overs)
DS Lehmann 119 (119); RAP Nissanka 3/54 (8 overs)		KC Sangakkara 40 (70); B Lee 3/23 (7 overs)

Australia won by 142 runs
WACA Ground, Perth
Umpires: DB Hair (Aus) and RE Koertzen (SA)
Player of the match: DS Lehmann (Aus)

- Australia won the toss and elected to bat.

=== 6th Match: Australia v Sri Lanka ===
9 January 2003
14:15 (D/N)
Scorecard

Sri Lanka; 5/343 (50 overs)	v	Australia; 264 (49.3 overs)
ST Jayasuriya 122 (105); SR Watson 2/72 (10 overs)		MG Bevan 41 (51); ST Jayasuriya 4/39 (10 overs)

Sri Lanka won by 79 runs
Sydney Cricket Ground, Sydney
Umpires: SJA Taufel (Aus) and RB Tiffin (Zim)
Player of the match: ST Jayasuriya (SL)

- Australia won the toss and elected to bowl.

=== 7th Match: Australia v England ===
11 January 2003
10:00
Scorecard

Australia; 4/271 (50 overs)	v	England; 7/264 (50 overs)
DR Martyn 101* (114); JM Anderson 2/40 (10 overs)		NV Knight 85 (102); GB Hogg 3/55 (9 overs)

Australia won by 7 runs
Bellerive Oval, Hobart
Umpires: DB Hair (Aus) and DL Orchard (SA)
Player of the match: DR Martyn (Aus)

- Australia won the toss and elected to bat.

=== 8th Match: England v Sri Lanka ===
13 January 2003
14:15 (D/N)
Scorecard

Sri Lanka; 7/284 (50 overs)	v	England; 253 (49.2 overs)
ST Jayasuriya 106 (110); AR Caddick 2/29 (10 overs)		ME Trescothick 85 (86); PA de Silva 4/30 (6.2 overs)

Sri Lanka won by 31 runs
Sydney Cricket Ground, Sydney
Umpires: DB Hair (Aus) and RB Tiffin (Zim)
Player of the match: ST Jayasuriya (SL)

- Sri Lanka won the toss and elected to bat.

=== 9th Match: Australia v Sri Lanka ===
15 January 2003
13:15 (D/N)
Scorecard

Sri Lanka; 9/211 (50 overs)	v	Australia; 6/214 (48.5 overs)
MS Atapattu 70 (101); GB Hogg 2/38 (10 overs)		MG Bevan 45* (79); M Muralitharan 4/27 (10 overs)

Australia won by 4 wickets
The Gabba, Brisbane
Umpires: SJA Taufel (Aus) and DL Orchard (SA)
Player of the match: MG Bevan (Aus)

- Sri Lanka won the toss and elected to bat.

=== 10th Match: England v Sri Lanka ===
17 January 2003
13:45 (D/N)
Scorecard

England; 7/279 (50 overs)	v	Sri Lanka; 260 (49.2 overs)
NV Knight 88 (110); MKGCB Lakshitha 2/42 (9 overs)		ST Jayasuriya 99 (83); AR Caddick 4/35 (10 overs)

England won by 19 runs
Adelaide Oval, Adelaide
Umpires: DJ Harper (Aus) and RB Tiffin (Zim)
Player of the match: AR Caddick (Eng)

- England won the toss and elected to bat.

=== 11th Match: Australia v England ===
19 January 2003
13:45 (D/N)
Scorecard

England; 152 (48.3 overs)	v	Australia; 6/153 (47.3 overs)
PD Collingwood 63* (106); NW Bracken 3/21 (7.3 overs)		DR Martyn 59 (102); ID Blackwell 3/26 (10 overs)

Australia won by 4 wickets
Adelaide Oval, Adelaide
Umpires: DJ Harper (Aus) and DL Orchard (SA)
Player of the match: NW Bracken (Aus)

- England won the toss and elected to bat.
- Michael Clarke (Aus) made his ODI debut.

=== 12th Match: Australia v Sri Lanka ===
21 January 2003
14:15 (D/N)
Scorecard

Sri Lanka; 8/214 (50 overs)	v	Australia; 1/215 (34.3 overs)
DA Gunawardene 45 (72); GB Hogg 3/37 (10 overs)		Ricky Ponting 106* (97); WPUJC Vaas 1/45 (8 overs)

Australia won by 9 wickets
Melbourne Cricket Ground, Melbourne
Umpires: DJ Harper (Aus) and RB Tiffin (Zim)
Player of the match: RT Ponting (Aus)

- Australia won the toss and elected to bat.

== Final series ==
=== 1st Final: Australia v England ===
23 January 2003
14:15 (D/N)
Scorecard

England; 117 (41 overs)	v	Australia; 0/118 (12.2 overs)
PD Collingwood 43 (71); AJ Bichel 4/18 (7 overs)		AC Gilchrist 69* (37); RC Irani 0/14 (2 overs)

Australia won by 10 wickets
Sydney Cricket Ground, Sydney
Umpires: DL Orchard (SA) and SJA Taufel (Aus)
Player of the match: B Lee (Aus)

- England won the toss and elected to bat.

=== 2nd Final: Australia v England ===
25 January 2003
14:15 (D/N)
Scorecard

Australia; 7/229 (50 overs)	v	England; 224 (49.3 overs)
GB Hogg 71* (77); RC Irani 3/46 (10 overs)		AJ Stewart 60 (70); B Lee 5/30 (9.3 overs)

Australia won by 5 runs
Melbourne Cricket Ground, Melbourne
Umpires: DB Hair (Aus) and RB Tiffin (Zim)
Player of the match: B Lee (Aus)

- Australia won the toss and elected to bat.
- Australia won the best of three final series against England 2–0.

== Gallery ==
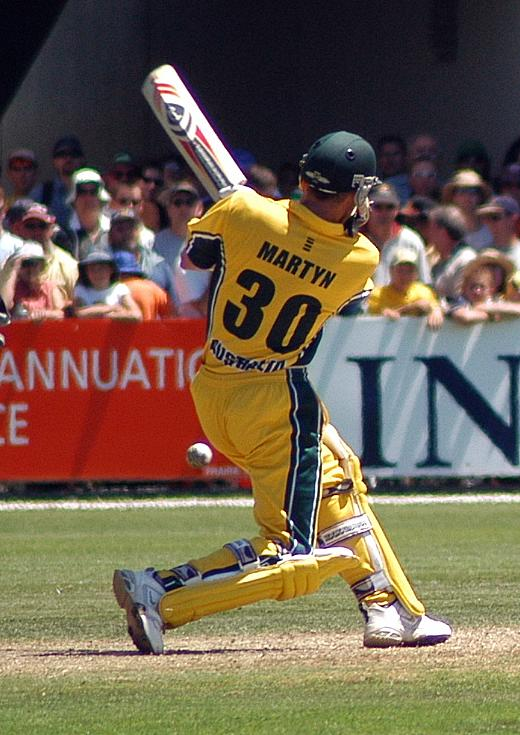
Damien Martyn strikes a four - England vs Australia, Bellerive Oval

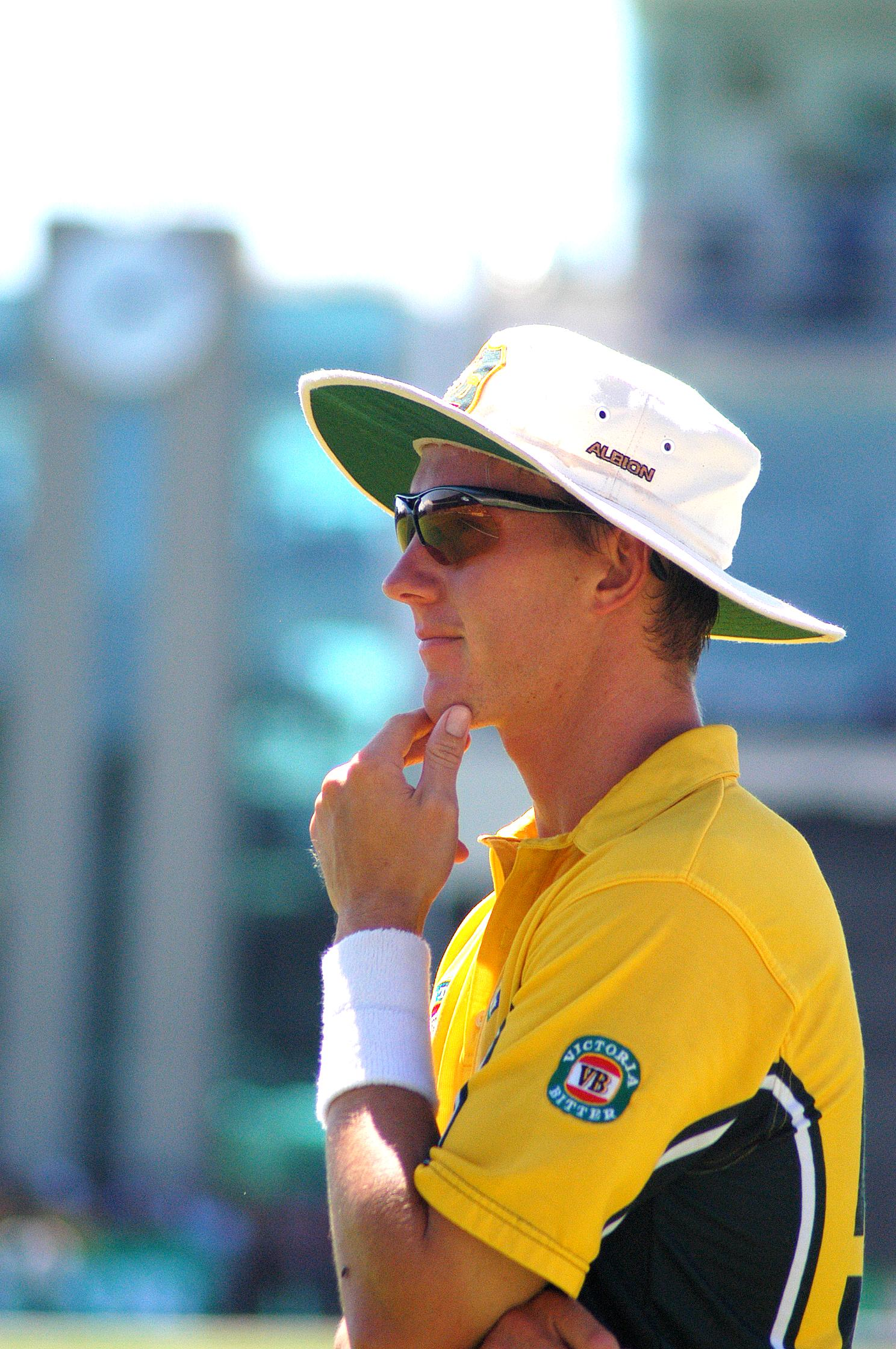
Brett Lee in the outfield in the 7th match against England at Bellerive Oval
