= Indian cricket team in Australia in 2007–08 =

International cricket tour

	India	Australia
- Dates: 20 December 2007 – 4 March 2008
Captains	Anil Kumble; MS Dhoni (ODIs and T20Is)	Ricky Ponting

Test series
- Result: Australia won the 4-match series 2–1
Most runs	Sachin Tendulkar (493)	Matthew Hayden (410)
Most wickets	Anil Kumble (20)	Brett Lee (24)
- Player of the series: Brett Lee (Aus)

Twenty20 International series
- Results: Australia won the 1-match series 1–0
Most runs	Irfan Pathan (26)	Michael Clarke (37)
Most wickets	Praveen Kumar (1)	Nathan Bracken (3)
- Player of the series: Michael Clarke (Aus)

The Indian cricket team began a tour of Australia in December 2007, playing the 4 match Test series for the Border–Gavaskar Trophy, followed by a single Twenty20 match on 1 February 2008. They also participated in the Commonwealth Bank tri-series against Australia and Sri Lanka from 3 February to 4 March.

== Squads ==
Test squads		ODIs and Twenty20 squads
India	Australia	India	Australia
Anil Kumble (c)	Ricky Ponting (c)	M S Dhoni (c & wk)	Ricky Ponting (c)
M S Dhoni (wk)	Adam Gilchrist (wk)	Sachin Tendulkar	Adam Gilchrist (wk)
Gautam Gambhir	Phil Jaques	Yuvraj Singh	Nathan Bracken
Rahul Dravid	Matthew Hayden	Virender Sehwag	Michael Clarke
Sourav Ganguly	Michael Hussey	Dinesh Karthik	Ben Hilfenhaus
Harbhajan Singh	Andrew Symonds	Robin Uthappa	Brad Hodge
Wasim Jaffer	Mitchell Johnson	Gautam Gambhir	James Hopes
Irfan Pathan	Stuart Clark	Suresh Raina	David Hussey
Zaheer Khan	Brett Lee	Rohit Sharma	Michael Hussey
V. V. S. Laxman	Shaun Tait	Irfan Pathan	Brett Lee
Pankaj Singh	Brad Hogg	Praveen Kumar	Ashley Noffke
Ishant Sharma	Michael Clarke	Munaf Patel	Andrew Symonds
R. P. Singh	Chris Rogers	Ishant Sharma	Adam Voges
Virender Sehwag		Sreesanth
Sachin Tendulkar		Harbhajan Singh
Yuvraj Singh		Piyush Chawla
V. R. V. Singh		Manoj Tiwary

== Tour matches ==
Before heading into the Test series, only one tour game was planned for India, against Victoria. After the Second Test, a second tour game was played, against ACT Invitational XI in Canberra. MS Dhoni led the Indians after regular captain Anil Kumble rested.

20–22 December
Scorecard

India	v	Victoria
133/4 (48 overs); Sourav Ganguly 59 (99); Allan Wise 4/37 (15 overs)

Match drawn
Junction Oval, Melbourne
Umpires: Paul Reiffel and John Ward

- Indians won the toss and elected to bat.
- Play in days 1 and 2 reduced due to rain, no play 3rd day due to rain.
- Aaron Finch and John Hastings (both Victoria) made their debut in first-class matches.

10–12 January
Scorecard

Indians	v	(Australian Capital Territory) ACT Invitational XI
325/9d (84 overs); Wasim Jaffer 92 (191); Luke Swards 3/45 (17 overs)		292/8d (93 overs); John Rogers 98 (190); Ishant Sharma 3/26 (11 overs)
281/4d (58 overs); Virender Sehwag 113 (78); Ryan Bulger 2/120 (24 overs)		60/3 (17 overs); Chris Rogers 17 (10); Pankaj Singh 2/21 (5 overs)

Match drawn
Manuka Oval, Canberra
Umpires: Darren Goodger and Rod Tucker

- Indians won the toss and elected to bat.
- 12 players per side (11 batting, 11 fielding).

== Test series ==
=== 1st Test ===
26–29 December
Scorecard

Australia	v	India
343 (92.4 overs); Matthew Hayden 124 (183); Anil Kumble 5/84 (25 overs)		196 (71.5 overs); Sachin Tendulkar 62 (77); Stuart Clark 4/28 (15 overs)
351/7d (88 overs); Michael Clarke 73 (113); Harbhajan Singh 3/101 (26 overs)		161 (74 overs); VVS Laxman 42 (112); Mitchell Johnson 3/21 (15 overs)

Australia won by 337 runs
Melbourne Cricket Ground, Melbourne
Umpires: Mark Benson (Eng) and Billy Bowden (NZ)
Player of the match: Matthew Hayden (Aus)

- Australia won the toss and elected to bat.
- Sourav Ganguly (Ind) played his 100th Test.
- Adam Gilchrist went past Ian Healy in the record for most dismissals by an Australia wicket-keeper (396).

Day One Australia won the toss and elected to bat and after surviving playing and missing and edging some balls through the cordon, built a strong platform with a century opening stand before Phil Jaques was stumped on 66. Ponting and Hussey got out shortly after falling for 4 and 2 respectively. Hayden brought up another Boxing Day a hundred after hitting a four. India then picked up the wicket of a struggling Clarke for 20. Kumble then picked up the wickets of Symonds and Gilchrist. Lee fell for a duck and Hogg was also out leaving Australia 9/323.

Day Two The second day Johnson and Clark batted well before Clark got out leaving Australia with a healthy score of 343. The Indian team were sent into bat and Dravid and Jaffer batted very slowly before losing early wickets. Tendulkar was the highlight of the innings scoring 62 before being bowled by Clark. The rest of the batting line up fell cheaply all out for 196. Australia then went in to bat late in the day with Jaques and Hayden not out at the end of the day to put Australia in a healthy position at stumps.

Day Three Australia resumed play firmly on top with all the batsmen getting starts except Ponting with Clarke top scoring with 73. At 7/351 Ponting declared sending India in to bat with a near impossible target of 499 to win. Jaffer and Dravid survived until the end of the day giving India a slight chance of winning.

Day Four India lost early wickets on day four and only Laxman and Ganguly scored above 20. The Australian bowlers ripped through the middle order with Johnson getting three along with the match-ending wicket of RP Singh. India were all out for 161 with Australia winning by 337 runs with a day to spare going 1–0 up in the best of 4 series. This also brought up 15 straight Test victories just one behind the record, held by Australia under the captaincy of Steve Waugh.

=== 2nd Test ===
2–6 January
Scorecard

Australia	v	India
463 (112.3 overs); Andrew Symonds 162* (226); Anil Kumble 4/106 (25.3 overs)		532 (138.2 overs); Sachin Tendulkar 154* (243); Brett Lee 5/119 (32.2 overs)
401/7d (107 overs); Michael Hussey 145* (259); Anil Kumble 4/148 (40 overs)		210 (70.5 overs); Sourav Ganguly 51 (56); Michael Clarke 3/5 (1.5 overs)

Australia won by 122 runs
Sydney Cricket Ground, Sydney
Umpires: Mark Benson (Eng) and Steve Bucknor (WI)
Player of the match: Andrew Symonds (Aus)

- Australia equalled the record of sixteen consecutive test wins set by them in 2000–01

Day One India lost the toss again and Australia elected to bat, R.P Singh took Jaques for 0 his first ever Test duck in front of his home crowd. This left Australia 1 wicket down with no runs scored. Hayden followed soon after leaving Ponting and Hussey at the crease. The two survived until lunch Ponting scoring a half century. Harbhajan dismissed Ponting again causing a middle order collapse to leave Australia 6/137. On 30, Symonds was clearly caught behind off the bowling of Sharma but umpire Steve Bucknor controversially did not give it out. Symonds then went on to make 162 not out, with Hogg also scoring his first Test 50.

Day Two India dismissed the lower order in the morning with Australia all out for 463. Brett Lee bowled Jaffer before the partnership of Dravid and Laxman took over the crease. Laxman looked to play shots while Dravid was on the defence. Dravid made 55 while Laxman scored his second century at the SCG. Australian took late wickets leaving Tendulkar and Ganguly at the crease at stumps.

Day Three Tendulkar made another SCG century scoring 154 not out with the rest of the batsman contributing healthy scores. India held a 69 run lead, quite remarkable considering the position they were in after day one. Hayden and Jaques were unbeaten at stumps.

Day Four Jaques was out to Kumble shortly after regaining the lead. Ponting was caught off Harbhajan sparking major celebrations among the Indians. Hayden and Hussey took over the crease with Hayden scoring another hundred. Hayden had to get Ricky Ponting as a runner due to an injury, and was eventually dismissed of Kumble for 123. On the next ball Kumble claimed Clarke for a golden duck. On the hat-trick ball Kumble hit Symonds on the pads, sparking a big appeal from the Indian team, but it was not given. Symonds and Hussey remained unbeaten at stumps.

Day Five Australia started the final day at a slower rate then what was expected. Hussey went on to make his first century against India ending on 145 not out. Symonds also scored a half century before getting out at slip. With two overs available to bowl before lunch, Australia declared setting India a target of 333 to win. Many commentators opined that Ponting had declared too late in the innings. The situation of the game meant that India needed a run rate of well over 4, nearly impossible on the decaying SCG pitch. Australia needed 10 wickets to win in a minimum of 72 overs. Before lunch Jaffer fell to Lee, as he had in all four innings to date on the tour. The rest of the top and middle order fell without a large change on the scoreboard. The highest score was that of Ganguly who fell to a controversial decision on 51. Captain Anil Kumble led by example after the Laxman dismissal scoring 45 not out and spending over 2 hours at the crease. With just 2 overs remaining on day 5, India had 3 wickets in hand and were 122 runs behind. The game looked destined to be a draw. However, Michael Clarke took 3 wickets in 5 balls to give Australia victory with just 7 balls remaining.

The umpiring was heavily criticised after the match, with India believing they had a too-large share of bad decisions. After the match the Indian team sought to replace one of the umpires for the 3rd Test, going against a prior agreement stating that "Neither team has a right to object to an umpire's appointment."

=== 3rd Test ===
16–19 January
Scorecard

India	v	Australia
330 (98.2 overs); Rahul Dravid 93 (183); Mitchell Johnson 4/86 (28.2 overs)		212 (50 overs); Andrew Symonds 66 (70); RP Singh 4/68 (14 overs)
294 (80.4 overs); VVS Laxman 79 (156); Stuart Clark 4/61 (19 overs)		340 (86.5 overs); Michael Clarke 81 (134); Irfan Pathan 3/54 (16 overs)

India won by 72 runs
WACA Ground, Perth
Umpires: Asad Rauf (Pak) and Billy Bowden (NZ)
Player of the match: Irfan Pathan (Ind)

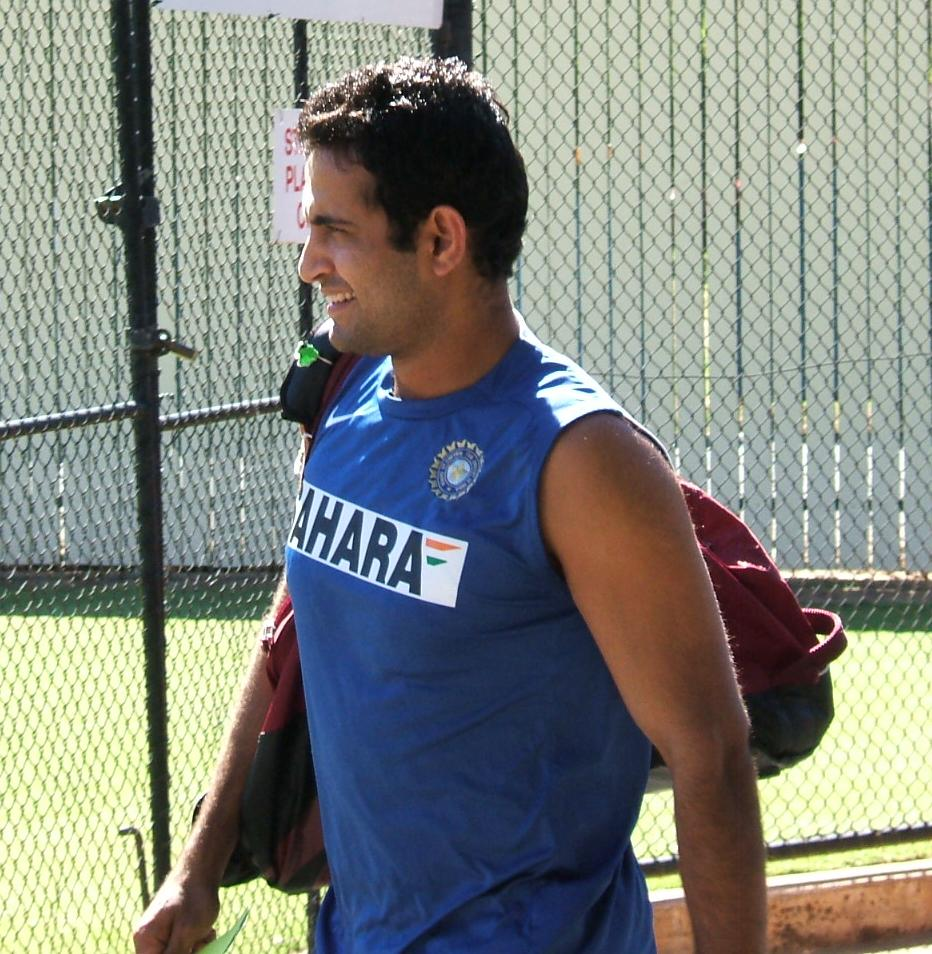
Irfan Pathan

Day One India won the toss for the first time in the series, and elected to bat first. Virender Sehwag got his first chance in the series and played a typically attacking innings, providing the team with a good start along with Wasim Jaffer. Both openers went within two runs of each other and Australia slowed the scoring for some time. Sachin Tendulkar and Rahul Dravid then came in and steadied the ship, taking the team to a relatively safe score with individual fifties before being dismissed, Dravid missing his century by seven runs. Australia took a few wickets at the end of the day to leave the day's honours even with India batting at 297/6 at the end of the day's play. Stuart Clark and Brett Lee were the standout performers for Australia.

Day Two The Indian batsmen took a few runs before Australia took four wickets for just two runs, closing the innings at 330. In reply, India's young pace attack kept Australia down with some fine swing bowling, pushing Australia down to 5/61. Andrew Symonds and Adam Gilchrist then put up an attacking 102 run partnership to engineer an Australian revival but were soon dismissed in quick succession. Indian captain Anil Kumble claimed Symonds as his 600th Test wicket. The pacers then cleaned up the tail, overcoming a few minor scares from tailenders Mitchell Johnson and Shaun Tait. Australia finished at 212, 118 runs behind, leaving the Indian batsmen to negotiate the last hour of the day's play. Stuart Clark took an early wicket, dismissing Wasim Jaffer, leaving India with a lead of 170 with nine wickets remaining at stumps with Sehwag and nightwatchman Irfan Pathan at the crease.

Day Three The morning session was finely balanced, with Australia reducing India to 125 for 5. Sehwag fell to Clark, while Brett Lee took the wickets of Rahul Dravid and Tendulkar, and Mitchell Johnson dismissed Sourav Ganguly. India's day was saved by the lower order, led by the 79 of VVS Laxman. Pathan finished on 46 and Mahendra Singh Dhoni a gritty 38, but the biggest irritant to Australia proved to be RP Singh, who scored a career-high 30 as part of a 51-run ninth-wicket partnership with Laxman that took the India lead over 400 runs. India were finally dismissed for 294 when Laxman edged a Lee delivery to Gilchrist. Australia were set a daunting target of 413 to win—greater than all but one successful run chase in Test history to date. Pathan took the wickets of Chris Rogers and Phil Jaques before stumps, leaving Australia on 65/2.

Day Four Ricky Ponting and Mike Hussey stayed at the crease for a major part of the morning session. Ishant Sharma troubled Ponting throughout this period, with the Australian captain unable to take control. After a seven-over spell, Anil Kumble was about to replace Sharma with RP Singh, when Virender Sehwag asked him to retain Sharma. The ploy worked and Ponting was dismissed off the first ball of that over. This triggered the fall of the Australian resistance, as they lost four wickets in the session after lunch (including the contentious dismissals of Hussey and Andrew Symonds). Sehwag was brought in to bowl and responded with the prize scalps of Adam Gilchrist and Brett Lee. Towards the end, Michael Clarke (61) kept up the resistance in partnerships of 50 and 24 with Gilchrist and Mitchell Johnson. Johnson himself made his first Test fifty and was involved in a whirlwind partnership of 74 with Stuart Clark, but once last man Shaun Tait came in at the fall of Clark, it was only a matter of time before India took the match; RP Singh did the honours with a yorker that went hit Tait's foot outside the leg stump and rolled onto his stumps, half an hour before the close of the day's play.

The game was widely praised for the high standard of cricket on offer throughout. The Indians were particularly praised for coming back from two games down in the series to deny Australia a record seventeenth consecutive Test victory at a venue whose pitch has, over the years, proved to be the downfall of almost every visiting team. Indian captain Anil Kumble considered this win as his best win ever.

The defeat also end Australia's unbeaten streak in Tests at the WACA for 11 years after their 1997 loss to the West Indies. As a result, India became first and only Asian team to win a test match at the WACA.

=== 4th Test ===
24–28 January
Scorecard

India	v	Australia
526 (152.5 overs); Sachin Tendulkar 153 (205); Mitchell Johnson 4/126 (37.5 overs)		563 (181 overs); Ricky Ponting 140 (266); Irfan Pathan 3/112 (36 overs)
269/7d (90 overs); Virender Sehwag 151 (236); Mitchell Johnson 2/33 (16 overs)

Match drawn
Adelaide Oval, Adelaide
Umpires: Asad Rauf (Pak) and Billy Bowden (NZ)
Player of the match: Sachin Tendulkar (Ind)

Day One India won the toss and elected to bat first. While India brought in Harbhajan Singh in place of Wasim Jaffer, Australia brought back Matthew Hayden and Brad Hogg replacing Chris Rogers and Shaun Tait. Irfan Pathan and Virender Sehwag opened the innings for India. At lunch, India were at 89/2 with Mitchell Johnson taking both the wickets of Irfan Pathan and Rahul Dravid. In the post-lunch session Sehwag (63) and Sourav Ganguly (7) got out, as India went to tea break at 187/4. In the final session of the day, Sachin Tendulkar scored his 39th Test a hundred, and VVS Laxman got out after scoring 51. At the end of the day's play, India were at 309/5 with Sachin and Dhoni remained as the not-out batsmen. Brett Lee and Mitchell Johnson both got 2 wickets, while Brad Hogg got the single wicket of Sourav Ganguly. Throughout the day, the bowling was at a slower rate, as Australia completed the day with having only 86 overs bowled, even after 30 minutes of additional play.

Day Two Tendulkar and Dhoni took the overnight score to 336 before Dhoni was out, caught by Symonds off the bowling of Johnson, early on the second day. India suffered a blow when Tendulkar's was the next wicket to fall, caught by Hogg off the bowling of Lee; his final score was 153. At lunch, India had reached 405/7 with Kumble and Harbhajan Singh at the crease. The pair ended up putting on a 107-run partnership when Harbhajan was finally out, caught by Gilchrist off Symonds, in the 131st over. Harbhajan's dismissal meant Gilchrist beat Mark Boucher's record for wicket-keeper dismissals; Gilchrist became the new record-holder with 414 dismissals. Following the day's play, Gilchrist announced that the Adelaide Test would be his last, effectively retiring from Test cricket and from all international cricket once the one-day series with India and Sri Lanka concluded in March. India were finally dismissed for 526 after tea on the second day, they now needing to dismiss Australia cheaply to be in a good position of winning the Test and thereby squaring the series. Johnson proved to be the most effective of the Australian bowlers, finishing up with innings figures of 4/126. With Australia having to face 21 overs before stumps on the second day, India were disappointed not to take a wicket, Australia ending the day on 62/0.

Day Three Any hope of an Indian breakthrough early on the third day soon evaporated as Australia's openers, Jaques and Hayden, continued to make runs. They batted cautiously, averaging 3 runs an over, and ended up putting on 159 for the first wicket. Kumble made the breakthrough not long after lunch when he bowled Jaques. Hayden was able to make his 30th Test century before he was bowled by Sharma on 103. Ponting and Hussey then guided Australia safely to 225/2 at tea, making the most of the placid pitch. Pathan then bowled Hussey shortly after tea and Australia's score was 241/3. Ponting and Clarke batted out the rest of the day, however, and with Australia finishing on 322/3, a draw was looking the most likely result.

Day Four The Adelaide pitch continued to hold up for the batsmen and Ponting and Clarke took off largely from where they left the previous day. The pair ended up making a 210-run partnership before Ponting was bowled by Sehwag after lunch on the fourth day. He had ended up with 140 runs off 396 balls, the cautious batting reflecting Australia's desire not to be dismissed cheaply and risk losing the Test and a series victory. Clarke had become the fourth batsman in the Test to make a century after he reached 100 in the over where Ponting was dismissed; he was out finally to Sharma, caught by Laxman, on 118 and Australia's score was 490/5. His dismissal brought Gilchrist to the crease in what was looking increasingly like his last Test innings given that it was the fourth day and India were still to bat again. However, any hope of final innings glory was dashed when Gilchrist was dismissed cheaply by a catch from Sehwag in the covers off the bowling of Pathan. His final Test score was 14 and he finished up with career figures of 5,570 runs at an average of 47.60. The score was now 506/6 and 30 from Symonds, with some late contributions from Hogg and Johnson, allowed Australia's innings to conclude at 563, a slight first innings lead of 37. The wickets were spread relatively evenly among India's bowlers, with both Pathan and Sharma taking three wickets each. With a further 17 overs to play, India started their second innings and had reached 45/1 at stumps on the fourth day.

Day Five After the loss of the first wicket the previous day, India batted solidly and had made 128 before the loss of its second wicket, Tendulkar, shortly before lunch. With Australia needing a cheap dismissal of India to have any hope of winning the Test, Sehwag put paid to this outcome by making a commanding 151. By the time he was out after tea, India had made 253/6 and had put the Test out of danger. With a draw being the only possible result, Kumble did the inevitable and declared India's innings over at 269/7, causing play to finish early. The outcome of the Test reflected both the closeness of the series and the evenness between the two sides.

== T20I match ==
1 February
Scorecard

India; 74 (17.3 overs)	v	Australia; 75/1 (11.2 overs)
Irfan Pathan 26 (30); Nathan Bracken 3/11 (2.3 overs)		Michael Clarke 37* (37); Praveen Kumar 1/15 (2 overs)

Australia won by 9 wickets
Melbourne Cricket Ground, Melbourne
85,000
Umpires: Bruce Oxenford (Aus) and Simon Taufel (Aus)
Player of the match: Michael Clarke (Aus)

- India won the toss and elected to bat.
- David Hussey (Aus), Ishant Sharma and Praveen Kumar (Ind) all made their T20I debuts.

== Commonwealth Bank Series ==
The 2007–08 edition of the Commonwealth Bank Series was a One Day International cricket tournament held in Australia. The Commonwealth Bank Series is an annual event involving the national teams of Australia, India and Sri Lanka. India won the event with a 2–0 sweep of the hosts in the final series.

The first two matches were shaping up for excellent contests after their first Innings. However heavy rain in Brisbane, caused by a cyclone in the Pacific Ocean, saw the first two matches of the series abandoned. Australia was first to win a match in the series after a Sri Lanka collapsed in game 3.

Australia was the best team during the regular matches, taking 4 wins with bonus points. However, India defeated Australia 2–0 in the best of 3 final series to win the tournament. This is the second time in a row Australia has lost their home tri-nations' series. Last year they lost to England. Fast bowler Nathan Bracken was the leading wicket taker in the tournament with 21 wickets and was named Player of the Series. Australian wicketkeeper Adam Gilchrist and left-arm spinner Brad Hogg retired from One Day International after the second final.

== Controversies ==
=== Umpiring incidents ===
The Second Test witnessed many controversial umpiring decisions from the two on-field umpires – Steve Bucknor and Mark Benson – and even the third umpire. The first of Bucknor's gaffes occurred when he did not give Andrew Symonds out caught behind at 30 when TV replays clearly showed that the ball had touched the bat's edge. The second was when Bucknor did not refer a stumping call against Symonds (now 148) to the third umpire. Replays showed the Australia all-rounder's foot wasn't grounded inside the crease when the bails came off. Symonds went on to make 162 not out and brought Australia back into the game. After these incidents, Symonds said, "I was very lucky. I was out when I was 30, given not out. That's cricket though, I can sit here and tell you about my bad decisions as well – but I won't." On the fifth day, Bucknor declared Rahul Dravid out caught behind though television replays later showed the ball had brushed his pad without touching his bat. In response to an official complaint about Bucknor's umpiring from the BCCI, the International Cricket Council (ICC) withdrew Bucknor from umpiring in the Third Test, and assigned Billy Bowden as his replacement. The other incident was when Benson consulted the fielding captain, Ricky Ponting, instead of Bucknor at square leg on whether Michael Clarke had taken the catch of Sourav Ganguly cleanly; he gave Ganguly out but the replay showed that the ball was touching the ground. (There had been a pre-series agreement between the captains about taking the fielder's word on catches; it was dropped after this Test.) These and other umpiring errors created a huge backlash against the Australian cricket team for not playing in the spirit of the game.

=== "Monkeygate" and unsportsmanlike conduct ===
Following the Second Test, there was speculation that the tour could be in jeopardy due to the fallout of an incident between Harbhajan and Symonds, with referee Mike Procter issuing a three-match ban against Harbhajan for racial sledging. This resulted in the Indians feeling hard done by; the ban was later rescinded after an appeal before a New Zealand High Court judge. Other acrimony included the reporting of Brad Hogg for unsportsmanshiplike conduct, reports of sledging by the Australian team and the scrapping of the captains' agreement about taking the fielder's word on catches. Indian captain Anil Kumble echoed the Bodyline quote, saying during an interview immediately after the match "Only one team was playing with the spirit of the game, that's all I can say."

== Records ==
- Australian team equalled the world record of 16 consecutive Test wins, after winning the 2nd Test of this series in Sydney. This record is being held also with Steve Waugh's team, which created the record in the year 2001.
- Anil Kumble secured his 600th Test wicket, in the 3rd Test of this series in Perth. Kumble became the third bowler to achieve this feat, after Shane Warne and Muttiah Muralitharan.
- For the second time, after 2001 Test in Kolkata, the Indian team broke the record sequence of Test wins for Australia. By losing to India in 3rd Test of this series, Australia's Test winning sequence ended after 16 consecutive wins starting from 2005 season.
- Australian wicket keeper Adam Gilchrist broke the record of most dismissals (414) in Test cricket by a wicket keeper, previously held by Mark Boucher (413) of South Africa.

Series Statistics
Record	Performance	Player	Country
Most runs
Most runs	493	Sachin Tendulkar	India
Most runs	410	Matthew Hayden	Australia
Most runs	410	Andrew Symonds	Australia
Most wickets
Most wickets	24	Brett Lee	Australia
Most wickets	20	Anil Kumble	India
Most wickets	16	Mitchell Johnson	Australia
Most dismissals (wicketkeeper)
Most dismissals (wicketkeeper)	25 (25 Ct + 0 St)	Adam Gilchrist	Australia
Most dismissals (wicketkeeper)	13 (10 Ct + 3 St)	Mahendra Singh Dhoni	India
Most catches (fielder)
Most catches (fielder)	9	Rahul Dravid	India
Most catches (fielder)	8	Michael Hussey	Australia
Most catches (fielder)	6	Michael Clarke	Australia
Source: ESPNcricinfo
