= Craig White =

English cricketer

Personal information
- Full name: Craig White
- Born: 16 December 1969 (age 56); Morley, England
- Nickname: Chalky, Bassey
- Height: 6 ft 1 in (1.85 m)
- Batting: Right-handed
- Bowling: Right-arm fast-medium
- Role: All rounder
- Relatives: Darren Lehmann (Brother-in-law)

International information
- National side: England (1994–2003)
- Test debut (cap 567): 2 June 1994 v New Zealand
- Last Test: 26 December 2002 v Australia
- ODI debut (cap 129): 6 December 1994 v Australia
- Last ODI: 2 March 2003 v Australia
- ODI shirt no.: 6

Domestic team information
- Years: Team
- 1990–2008: Yorkshire (squad no. 13)
- 1990/91: Victoria
- 1999/00: Central Districts

Career statistics
Competition	Test	ODI	FC	LA
Matches	30	51	276	362
Runs scored	1,052	568	12,395	7,317
Batting average	24.46	15.77	32.53	26.51
100s/50s	1/5	0/1	21/62	5/30
Top score	121	57*	186	148
Balls bowled	3,959	2,364	21,286	11,581
Wickets	59	65	395	337
Bowling average	37.62	26.55	28.50	25.10
5 wickets in innings	3	1	11	3
10 wickets in match	0	0	0	0
Best bowling	5/32	5/21	8/55	5/19
Catches/stumpings	14/–	12/–	167/–	101/–
- Source: CricketArchive, 5 October 2024

Craig White (born 1969) is an English former international cricketer. He is currently a cricket coach.

== Domestic career ==
Born 16 December 1969, Morley, West Yorkshire, England, White was brought up in Australia, but later moved back to England, his country of birth, where he became Yorkshire's first-ever overseas signing. At the time Yorkshire still operated a policy of only employing cricketers born in Yorkshire, even though English counties could play up to two overseas players if they wished. Having played in Australia, White was not initially qualified to play for England when he returned. This led to Yorkshire listing him as an overseas player.

At the start of his career, White was an all-rounder who batted right-handed and bowled right-arm off spin. In his twenties, he changed his style to become a fast bowler, after doubts were raised about the purity of his spin-bowling action.

== International career ==
When Raymond Illingworth became the new Chairman of Selectors for the English cricket team in 1994, he wanted the England team to contain an all-rounder who could bat at number six, and bowl first-change. He selected his fellow Yorkshireman White for this role, much to the surprise of many media pundits and fans. By this time, White had been playing in England long enough to qualify for the national team, and he made his Test début against New Zealand. His performances were inconsistent and he was dropped after eight matches.

In December 1994, he was Man of the Match for England against Australia A.

In 2000, he suffered a mystery blackout, waking up to find himself in a gutter in Scarborough. The incident suddenly revitalised him as a cricketer, and his county performances earned him a recall to the England team for the series against the West Indies. He had a successful series, contributing useful runs at numbers seven and eight, and becoming an important member of the pace-bowling attack, including dismissing Brian Lara for his first golden duck of his Test career. His bowling had improved to such an extent that he was capable of using reverse swing and reaching speeds of 90 mph off a short run-up.

White played well on subsequent tours to the subcontinent, with his most notable achievements being 93 against Pakistan at Lahore in 2000 and 121 against India at Ahmedabad in 2001. The latter performance was his one and only Test century. His thirtieth and final Test Match was against Australia in the Fourth Test of the 2002–03 Ashes series. An injury to his side prevented him from playing in the Fifth Test, but he later recovered to play in the 2003 Cricket World Cup, his last appearance for the national team.

White's Test career was distinguished by inconsistency: with the ball, he took just fourteen wickets in his first ten Tests, followed by two consecutive five-wicket draws, and then no more than a two-for in his next fourteen Tests, before finally bowing out with a dozen in the three Ashes matches against the Australians; with the bat, meanwhile, he failed on two occasions to reach double figures more than once over the course of nine innings, but nevertheless gave solid accounts of himself on the Asian subcontinent. "By the end," wrote satirist Andy Zaltzman, "it was hard to work out if he had overachieved or underachieved with both bat and ball. Or done exactly as well as he should."

After the World Cup, bowling-related injuries began to take their toll on White, and he re-invented himself as a specialist batsman for Yorkshire. Always an aggressive shot-maker, keen to hook and drive the quicks, and hit the spinners into the deep, he added greater depth and consistency to his game.

== Domestic career ==
In 2004, White was appointed captain of Yorkshire, and in 2005 led them to promotion from Division Two of the County Championship. However, he resigned as captain at the end of the 2006 season, having helped them to avoid relegation.

In 265 first-class matches, up to the end of 2006, White had scored 11,949 runs at 32.91 with a best of 186, while his 341 List A one day games brought him 8,933 runs at 26.56, with a best score of 148. He took 395 first-class wickets at an average of 28.47, with a best of eight for 55, and another 337 scalps in the one day game at 25.02, with a best of 5 for 19.

== Family and after cricket ==
White's sister, Andrea, is married to the former Australian international cricketer Darren Lehmann, who played together with White at Yorkshire for a number of years.

White is a former president of the Royal Burton Agnes Cricket Club, until 2017 when he was replaced by Phil Tufnell.

In 2012, White accepted a position on the coaching staff at Hampshire County Cricket Club.

== Notes ==
Sporting positions
Preceded by Dale Benkenstein	Hampshire cricket coach 2016–2018	Succeeded by Adrian Birrell
