= Michael Panckridge =

Australian author (born 1962)

- Born: 1962 (age 63–64)
- Occupations: Children's author, teacher
- Writing career
- Years active: c. 1990s–present
- Genre: Children's sports fiction
- Notable works: Legends series Toby Jones series

Michael Panckridge (born 1962) is an Australian author who writes fictional sport novels for children. He is also a secondary school teacher.

He has written over 35 novels and is famous for his Legends and Toby Jones series. His novels feature the likes of cricket, football, soccer, tennis, basketball and swimming. Other books he has written include the Clued Up Series – a collection of six books co-authored with Pam Harvey and the three League of Legends books – a rugby league series with input from ex-Australian captain Laurie Daley. He has also written three equally popular thriller books: The Vanishings, The Cursed, and The Immortal. His most recent series is called Gabrielle. The first two books of this series were released in April 2011. Panckridge is an ambassador for the Victorian Premier's Reading Challenge.

He lives in Geelong, Australia. His works are published by local publishing houses Black Dog Books and HarperCollins.
