= Brett Lee =

Australian cricketer (born 1976)

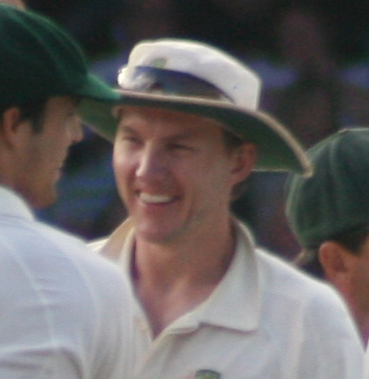
- Lee in January 2008

Personal information
- Full name: Brett Lee
- Born: 8 November 1976 (age 50); Wollongong, New South Wales, Australia
- Nickname: Binga
- Height: 1.87 m (6 ft 2 in)
- Batting: Right-handed
- Bowling: Right-arm fast
- Role: Bowler
- Relatives: Shane Lee (brother)
- Website: www.brettlee.com.au

International information
- National side: Australia (1999–2012)
- Test debut (cap 383): 26 December 1999 v India
- Last Test: 26 December 2008 v South Africa
- ODI debut (cap 140): 9 January 2000 v Pakistan
- Last ODI: 7 July 2012 v England
- ODI shirt no.: 58
- T20I debut (cap 7): 17 February 2005 v New Zealand
- Last T20I: 30 March 2012 v West Indies
- T20I shirt no.: 58

Domestic team information
- Years: Team
- 1997/98–2010/11: New South Wales (squad no. 58)
- 2008–2010: Kings XI Punjab (squad no. 58)
- 2010/11: Wellington (squad no. 58)
- 2011–2013: Kolkata Knight Riders (squad no. 58)
- 2011/12–2014/15: Sydney Sixers (squad no. 58)
- 2012/13: Otago (squad no. 58)

Career statistics
| Competition | Test | ODI | FC | LA |
|---|---|---|---|---|
| Matches | 76 | 221 | 116 | 262 |
| Runs scored | 1,451 | 1,176 | 2,120 | 1,365 |
| Batting average | 20.15 | 17.81 | 18.59 | 17.06 |
| 100s/50s | 0/5 | 0/3 | 0/8 | 0/3 |
| Top score | 64 | 59 | 97 | 59 |
| Balls bowled | 16,531 | 11,185 | 24,193 | 13,475 |
| Wickets | 310 | 380 | 487 | 438 |
| Bowling average | 30.81 | 23.36 | 28.22 | 24.05 |
| 5 wickets in innings | 10 | 9 | 20 | 10 |
| 10 wickets in match | 0 | 0 | 2 | 0 |
| Best bowling | 5/30 | 5/22 | 7/114 | 5/22 |
| Catches/stumpings | 23/– | 54/– | 35/– | 62/– |
Medal record
Men's Cricket
Representing Australia
ICC Cricket World Cup
| Winner | 2003 South Africa-Zimbabwe-Kenya |
ICC Champions Trophy
| Winner | 2006 India |
| Winner | 2009 South Africa |
- Source: ESPNcricinfo, 18 February 2017

Brett Lee (born 8 November 1976) is an Australian former international cricketer, who played all three formats of the game. During his international career, Lee was recognised as one of the fastest bowlers in the world.

Representing Australia, Lee won multiple ICC titles with the team: the 2003 Cricket World Cup, the 2006 ICC Champions Trophy, and the 2009 ICC Champions Trophy. Lee was the first bowler to take a hat-trick in the T20 format of the game which he did in 2007 ICC World Twenty20 in the inaugural tournament against Bangladesh, subsequently being the first bowler to do so at an ICC Men's T20 World Cup. Lee was also the first Australian bowler to take a hat-trick at a Cricket World Cup which he did in the 2003 Cricket World Cup Super Match game against Kenya.

In each of his first two years, Lee conceded fewer than 20 runs for every wicket taken, but later recorded figures in the low 30s. He was an athletic fielder and useful lower-order batter, with a batting average exceeding 20 in Test cricket. Lee finished his Test career with 310 wickets, and his One Day International career with 380 wickets. Considered one of the best bowlers of his generation, only Muttiah Muralitharan took more ODI wickets than Lee from 2000 to 2009.

He played his first Test in 1999 and retired from international cricket on 12 July 2012. He subsequently declined to renew his contract with his home state team New South Wales, but continued to play Twenty20 matches for several seasons after, notably in the Indian Premier League (IPL) and Big Bash League.

In January 2015, Lee announced his retirement from all forms of the game, effective at the end of the 2014–15 Big Bash League season. He has since found work as a film actor and a Fox Sports commentator.

== Domestic career ==
Lee started playing in the junior teams of his local team, Oak Flats Rats, and gradually worked his way up the ranks. He also played for Middleton cricket before he played first class career. At 16 he began playing first grade cricket for Campbelltown, where he managed to claim the wickets of a few New South Wales cricketers, and Mosman, where at one point, he shared the new ball with Shoaib Akhtar and briefly played alongside England batsman Andrew Strauss.

Lee was called up to the Australian Under 17 & 19 teams. In March 1994, he was forced out of the Australian under-19 team to tour India due to stress fractures in his lower back and it forced him to remodel his bowling action to minimise the impact on his back. He was awarded a scholarship to attend the AIS Australian Cricket Academy in the 1995–96 season. His contemporaries included fellow internationals Jason Gillespie and Mike Hussey.

Prior to making his first-class debut, Lee played for Mosman in the final of the 1996–97 Sydney Grade Cricket competition.

Lee was first named in the New South Wales Blues squad as the twelfth man for the 14–16 November match against Queensland in the 1997–98 Sheffield Shield. The following week, he made his first-class debut for the Blues against Western Australia and took 3 wickets at 114, including that of the captain Tom Moody. It would be his only appearance in the Sheffield Shield for the rest of the season. He ended a memorable month by taking a 5-wicket haul in the Sydney grade Limited-Overs Cup final against Bankstown on 30 November.

During the 1998–99 season Lee was a more regular presence in the latter stages of the Sheffield Shield. He took 14 wickets, including a 5-wicket haul against Tasmania in the second innings. He started the 1999–2000 season by claiming 8 wickets in his first two matches. Such performances impressed his New South Wales teammate Steve Waugh, who was then Australia captain, and culminated in his Test debut in December 1999. He finished the season as the Blues' second-highest wicket taker in the Pura Cup with 24 wickets in 5 matches.

After a successful Test series against India, Lee returned to domestic cricket and was named in the 2008 Pura Cup final. He hit his career best batting score, 97 against Victoria in the Blues' second innings and scored a record 176-run partnership with Beau Casson. In Victoria's second innings, he took 4–72, dismissing the last four tailenders, as the Blues won the final.

In 2009 he battled back from injury and was a key player in New South Wales' success during the Champions League Twenty20. During the final he played an important part with both bat and ball and was named Man of the Match. He also won the Man of the Series award.

Following his retirement from Test cricket, Lee stopped playing first-class cricket to concentrate on the limited-overs formats. He was the Blues' highest wicket-taker in the 2010–11 Ryobi One-Day Cup with 15 wickets and had the second best economy rate of the top five wicket-takers despite missing the latter stages of the campaign due to international duty.

In June 2012 he declined to renew his contract with the Blues, ending his 15-year association with his domestic team.

He retired from Big Bash League after playing in the final for the Sydney Sixers on 28 January 2015. In the dramatic final over, he took two wickets clean bowled in successive deliveries, and his hat-trick ball, the sixth of the over, resulted in a missed run out and the Perth Scorchers win by 4 wickets.

== International career ==
=== Debut days ===
One month after making his first class debut, Lee was chosen to represent the Australian A team on a tour of South Africa. He claimed two wickets but in that match stress fractures in his back from the previous injury re-opened and Lee was in a back brace for over three months.

=== Test career ===
By the late 1990s there were calls for Lee to be included in the national squad. Captain Steve Waugh, who also played with him for New South Wales, was impressed by Lee's debut and pushed for his inclusion into the national team. He was eventually chosen in the final 14 for the Test series against Pakistan in 1999 but failed to make the starting 11. By the time the Test series against India came around, he was twelfth man. However, he duly made his Test debut for Australia in December 1999 against the touring Indians, becoming Australia's 383rd Test cricketer.

Bowling first change, Lee took a wicket in his first over in Test cricket when he bowled Sadagoppan Ramesh with his fourth delivery. He also captured Rahul Dravid in his first spell before returning to take three wickets in six balls to finish the innings with figures of 5/47 from 17 overs, becoming the first Australian fast bowler since Dennis Lillee to take 5 wickets on debut. Lee took 13 wickets in his opening two Tests at the low average of 14.15.

Lee won the inaugural Donald Bradman Young Player of the Year Award at the Allan Border Medal award ceremony in 2000 soon after his debut.

Lee took 42 wickets in his opening three series, the most by any Australian bowler in the seven matches he played. He was selected for the Test series against the West Indies in late 2000. During the first Test he scored his first half-century in test cricket and in the next Test, took seven wickets including a five wicket haul in the second innings. However, he suffered a stress fracture of the lower back which kept him out of the next three Tests. He returned against Zimbabwe but soon suffered another setback a month later when he injured his right elbow and was sidelined until May 2001.

==== Return from injury ====
Lee returned to the international team for the 2001 Ashes series after recovering from an elbow injury. His comeback saw less success than his debut, managing only nine wickets in five Tests at 55.11. However, Lee was back as Australia's leading wicket-taker in the first and third Test against New Zealand later that year, in a series which he captured 5 wickets in the second innings and made a contribution of 61 with the bat in the first Test match. The series ended in a 0–0 draw. He finished the series with 14 wickets at 25.14. The two home and away series against South Africa were not as productive, yielding 19 wickets in six Tests at 38.42.

Lee only took five wickets in a match on three occasions between the New Zealand series and the 2003 Cricket World Cup. Lee came under pressure for his position after taking only five wickets at 46.50 in the three-Test series against Pakistan in 2002. Andy Bichel, who was filling for the injured Jason Gillespie, took eight wickets at 13.25. With the other frontline bowlers all taking wickets at less than 13, Lee was dropped when Gillespie returned for the first two Tests during the 2002–03 Ashes series. He returned for the Perth Test, after claiming a five wicket haul in a Pura Cup match against Queensland for New South Wales. He took thirteen wickets at 41.23 in three matches, compared to Bichel's ten at 35.1. After the 2003 Cricket World Cup, Lee took 17 wickets at 28.88 in four Tests against the West Indies. It was the first series in two years where he averaged under 30, and only the second in that period where he averaged under 40.

After a mid year break, he participated in a Two Test series against Bangladesh in northern Australia. He took six wickets at 31.66, and was Australia's most expensive bowler, with the other specialist bowlers averaging 15.55 against the lowest ranked team in Test cricket. He followed this with six wickets at 37 in a comfortable 2–0 Test series against Zimbabwe, in which the other specialist bowlers averaged 23.15.

Against the Indian batting line-up in the 2003–04 home series, which ended in a 1–1 draw for Australia, Lee was out of the first two Tests recovering from a torn abdominal muscle, an injury which he sustained during the Zimbabwe series.

==== Loss of Test position ====
Lee took eight wickets in 100 overs in the final two Tests against India, at an average of 59.50. This Test included a double century to Sachin Tendulkar in the Indians' first innings of 7/705 where Sachin and V.V.S. Laxman freely attacked Lee and other bowlers in the final Test in Sydney. He ended the series with the worst average and economy rate of Australia's front line bowlers.

He was subsequently replaced by fellow fast bowler Michael Kasprowicz in 2004 during the tour of Sri Lanka when Lee's ankle injury worsened, forcing him to return home to have surgery. This injury would force Lee out of the game for four and a half months to ensure his full recovery. Lee's form in the Test arena had been ineffective, and from July 2001 to January 2004, he had a Test bowling average of 38.42, compared to an average of 16.07 in his earlier career.

Lee was unable to reclaim his position for eighteen months, when Kasprowicz took 47 wickets at 23.74 in thirteen Tests, taking his wickets at a much lower cost than Lee had done in the previous three years. This included 17 wickets at 26.82 on the spin friendly pitches of the Indian subcontinent, helping Australia to its first whitewash in Sri Lanka, and its first series win in India for 35 years.

==== Test return ====
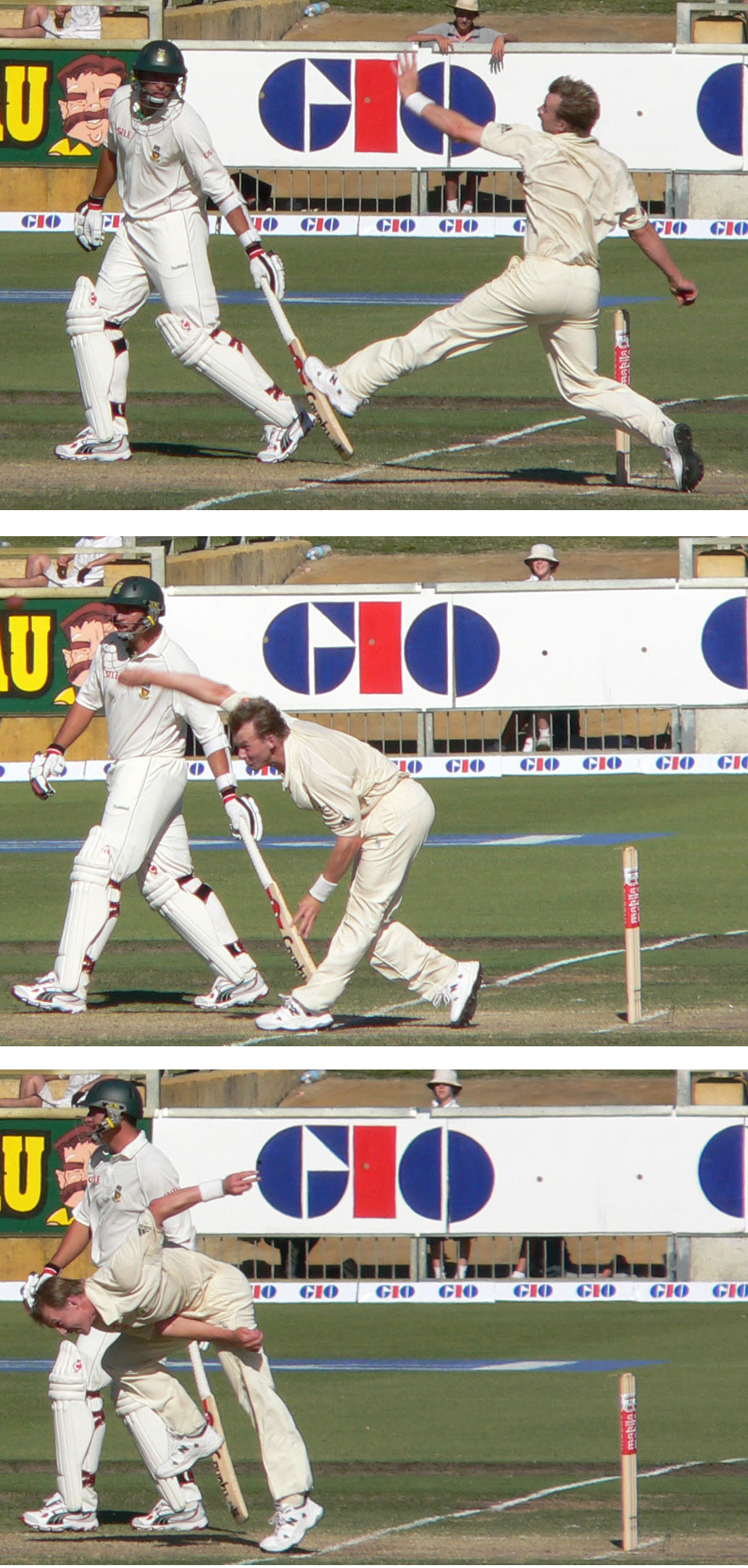
Brett Lee bowling against South Africa at the WACA in 2005

After 18 months on the sidelines, Lee returned to the Test team in the 2005 Ashes series. With Kasprowicz and Jason Gillespie both struggling for form, Lee returned to take the new ball with Glenn McGrath. He averaged 40 with the ball for the series, which some commentators have put down to having to bowl longer spells than he was accustomed to at the time, but was retained, in part because of his defiant batting which yielded runs at an average of 26.33. During the Ashes, he claimed his 150th test wicket off Andrew Strauss with a straight yorker on Day 1 of the third test.

Part of Lee's difficulty at Test level is that the benefits of his high speed, which give the batsmen less reaction time, also results in more erratic bowling. In recent times he has tried to concentrate solely on accuracy by reducing speed. During the first Test against the West Indies in late 2005 at the Gabba, after declaring that he would sacrifice pace and focus on 'line and length', Lee reverted to his initial style of bowling, based on the advice of his captain Ricky Ponting after his new method of bowling failed in the first innings. This saw him take 5/30 his fifth five-wicket haul in Tests, his first in four years.

In the 2005-06 Australian cricket season, Lee's Test figures improved from his 2001–04 difficulties, with a season bowling average of 25.74.

During South Africa's 2005–06 tour of Australia, Lee's form saw a steady improvement, with figures of 5/93 in the first Test at Perth. He finished the three Test series with 13 wickets and of the Australian bowlers, was second only to Shane Warne's 14 wickets in the series. Three Australian players including Lee, who was reprimanded in the Third Test in Sydney for showing dissent towards umpire Aleem Dar.

With the unavailability of Glenn McGrath for the tour of South Africa in March–April 2006, Lee became the spearhead of the Australian bowling line-up. In the second Test of that series, at Durban, Lee captured his 200th Test wicket in his 51st match and also captured figures of 5 for 69, on the back of 49 Test wickets in 2005. He was named as one of the Wisden Cricketers of the Year. He was unable to maintain his performance when Australia visited Bangladesh for a two Test series, taking two wickets at 93, coming bottom of Australia's bowling averages.

In the first three tests of the 2006–07 Ashes series, he only took eight wickets and was fined for excessive appealing in the Third Test in Adelaide when a LBW decision was not in his favour. However, during the week period between the Adelaide and Melbourne tests, he worked with Troy Cooley, Australia's bowling coach, to adjust his run up and came back in the 4th and final tests with more wickets. He finished the series 20 wickets, with his best bowling figures being 4 for 47 at an average of 33.20, including 6 in the final test. His tally was only bettered by his teammates Stuart Clark, Shane Warne and Glenn McGrath as the quartet claimed more wickets than the entire England bowling attack combined.

==== Post McGrath-Warne era ====
Following the retirements of Warne and McGrath, Lee rose to the challenge and was awarded the Man of the Series in the inaugural Warne-Muralidaran Trophy, a two-Test series against Sri Lanka in late 2007. In his first series as bowling spearhead reaped 16 wickets at an average of 17.5. This was achieved by bowling 5 km/h (3.1 mph) slower to improve accuracy. In the following series Lee took 24 wickets at 22.58 in four Tests against India. In this series he overtook Jason Gillespie to become Australia's 5th highest wicket taker. His consistent efforts saw him rewarded with the Man of the Series Award for the Border–Gavaskar Trophy, 2007–08. He capped off the season by winning the Allan Border Medal, the award given to the player adjudged Australia's best international cricketer of the past year.

Lee seemed underdone in the 2008 Australian tour of the West Indies, taking only 5 wickets in the first Test match, during which he seemed exhausted. He returned to productivity, taking eight wickets in the Second test, including a 5 wicket haul, and 6 in the Third Test.

During the Indian tour, Lee picked up a stomach virus and was unable to find his best form throughout the series. Lee showed glimpses of his best form when the team returned to Australia for a two test series with New Zealand, but generally seemed down on pace. However, he struggled in the two tests he played of the series with South Africa, which Australia lost 2–1, likely due to a niggling ankle injury and then a stress fracture he developed during the series (both in his left foot). The fracture broke completely during the second innings of the Boxing Day Test-match and he was forced to return home for surgery.

By the time he returned to the Australian team for the Ashes in 2009, his position as spearhead had been usurped by the left armer Mitchell Johnson. Additionally, the arrival of bowlers like Peter Siddle, Ben Hilfenhaus and Doug Bollinger ensured that Lee had to fight for a position in the team. However, he took six wickets in the first innings against the England Lions team in a practice match leading up to the Ashes. Lee was the only bowler to get reverse swing in this match and appeared to be in line for selection for the First Test at Cardiff. However, he picked up a left side strain and a sore rib in this match and he was ruled out of the first three Tests. He was then overlooked for a recall and never played test cricket again, announcing his retirement from test cricket at the beginning of 2010.

==== Retirement ====
Lee had been considering retiring from Test cricket for some time since 2008 due to the physical strain. In February 2010, he announced his retirement from Test cricket after consulting friend and England rival Andrew Flintoff, stating that bowling "at 150 km/h for five days is very hard on the body". He had been out with a string of injuries and had not played a Test since December 2008. He ended his Test career with 310 wickets in 76 tests, at the time the fourth highest Australian total behind Shane Warne, Glenn McGrath and Dennis Lillee.

=== One-day International career ===
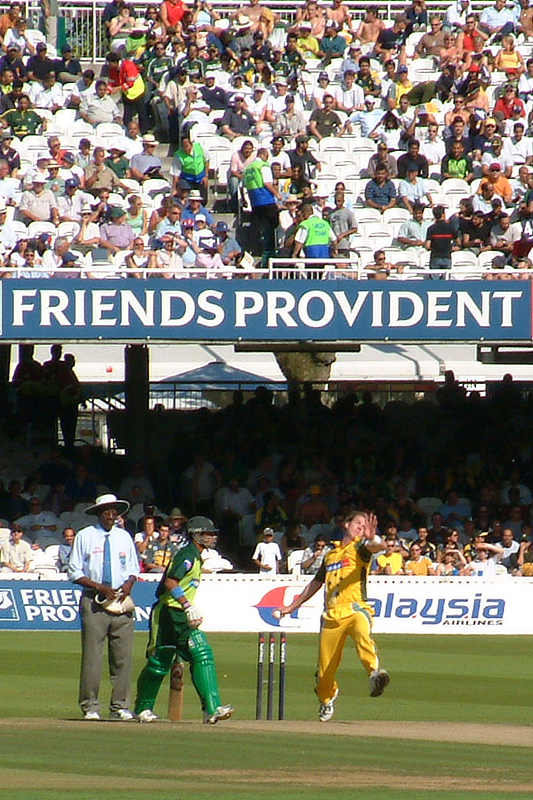
Lee bowling against Pakistan at Lord's, 2004-09-04

Lee made his One Day International debut for Australia against Pakistan on 9 January 2000 during the Carlton and United Breweries Series at the Gabba, Brisbane. He became the 140th ODI cricketer to represent Australia. In February 2002 against South Africa, he scored his first ODI half century, 51* not out.

In One-day Internationals, he was ranked by the ICC as the No. 1 ODI bowler in January 2006 and has been ranked among the top ten ODI bowlers since the start of 2003. His bowling strike rate of around 30 puts him amongst the most incisive in this form of the game. He also has a One-day International hat-trick to his name, achieved in the 2003 World Cup against Kenya. Lee was the first Australian and fourth bowler to ever achieve this feat in World Cup history.

In the matches Australia played in the 2005–06 triangular one day series, Lee gave a display of his useful batting abilities by making 57 in the second game in a 100 run partnership with Michael Hussey to pull Australia out of a middle order collapse. Lee finished the series with 15 wickets, the third highest tally behind Nathan Bracken and Muttiah Muralitharan.

His bowler-fielder partnership with long-time international teammate and wicket-keeper Adam Gilchrist yielded 58 wickets in 151 matches, the fourth highest of all time in ODI history.

==== 2003 World Cup ====
With main bowler Shane Warne banned from the 2003 World Cup the day before the opening match, Lee moved up the pecking order and, together with Andy Bichel and Glenn McGrath, formed one of the tournament's most lethal attacks, claiming 59 wickets between them. Lee concluded the tournament with 22 wickets off 83.1 overs at an average of 17.90, a wicket behind Sri Lankan left-arm fastbowler Chaminda Vaas. Lee also had a third leading strike-rate of 22.68 behind West Indian fast bowler Vasbert Drakes and Australian counterpart Andrew Bichel who topped the strike-rates with 19.43 and 21.37 respectively. He also reached the 160 km/h (99 mph) mark thrice; his delivery to Marvan Atapattu in the semi-final reached 160.1 km/h (99.5 mph) and hit 160.7 km/h (99.9 mph)160.6 km/h (99.8 mph) in his second over against England in the group stage.

Lee earned six of his 22 wickets during the group stage, 11 wickets during the Super-six stage, 3 from the semi-final and 2 wickets from the final which Australia won. He took one five-wicket haul, 5 for 42, against Trans-Tasman rivals New Zealand during their super-six encounter at Port Elizabeth to put Australia ahead after a dismal innings. He also earned his first international hat-trick with figures of 3 for 14 against Kenya during the last match of the super-six stage.

==== Comeback ====
After having to return home due to injury during the 2007 World Cup, Lee traveled with the squad to England for the 2009 "English summer" tour. He was left out of the Test team during the Ashes, but was in the one-day team for the NatWest Series in September. He was the highest wicket-taker for Australia with 12 and also took his ninth five-wicket haul in ODIs as Australia made a clean sweep winning all except one match in the series. With that five-wicket haul, he became the first person to take two five-wicket hauls in ODIs at Lord's; the ball used is now on display at Lord's MCC Museum. Later that month he was a part of the successful 2009 ICC Champions Trophy squad and was level on 6 wickets with teammates Peter Siddle and Shane Watson, the highest total for the Australian team. Injuries sustained in test matches forced him out until 2011, having not played for Australia for almost two years. In the subsequent ODI series, his return was more successful. He finished as the leading wicket-taker for the series with 11 scalps at 24.00, his series best figures of 3/27 coming in the third match at the SCG. His pace was consistently around the mid 140s km/h and on occasion he once again managed to break the 150 km/h (93 mph) mark..

Despite competition from younger bowlers and another injury setback, Lee managed to make the squad for the 2011 Cricket World Cup. He finished the tournament with 13 wickets, the highest of all the bowlers in the team. Of the 13 wickets, 4 came in the match against Pakistan but it was not enough as Australia lost the match and eventually crashed out at the quarterfinals to rivals India.

Against the West Indies in March 2012 he hit his highest score, 59 before getting caught off a ball by Kemar Roach. His final ODIs were during the 2012 tour of England and Ireland. During the match against Ireland he opened the bowling and bowled William Porterfield and Ed Joyce in only his first three deliveries.

==== Retirement ====
Upon his retirement from international cricket, Lee had played in 76 Tests, 221 ODIs and 25 T20Is, and had equaled Glenn McGrath's run of 380 wickets in ODI matches – the highest for Australia.

In July 2014, he played for the MCC team in the Bicentenary Celebration match at Lord's. In 2018, during his commentary for BT Sport in the 2017–18 Ashes series at the Sydney Cricket Ground, Lee revealed that he is an honorary member at Lord's, but not a lifetime member on his home ground at the SCG.

=== Twenty20 ===
Lee made his Twenty20 and T20 International debut on 15 February 2005 against New Zealand in the first ever T20 international match. He was called up to the squad for the 2007 ICC World Twenty20. During the tournament, he made history by claiming the first hat-trick in T20 internationals in the Group F match against Bangladesh and also won the Man of the Match award.

=== Bowling style ===
Lee was known for his pace and regularly clocked 140 km/h (87 mph) and above. He ranks only behind the Pakistani bowler Shoaib Akhtar (161.3 km/h, 100.2 mph) who is ranked as the fastest bowler of all time. The strain of consistently bowling at 150 km/h (93 mph) caused a string of stress fractures and recurring injuries and forced him to alter his strategy, which he amassed effectively. Rather than relying on pace alone, he used a wide array of deliveries aimed at wearing down the batsman, although he has been known to bowl entire spells above the 150 km/h (93 mph) mark. His fastest ball was clocked at 161.1 km/h (100.1 mph) against New Zealand in 2005. In a match against West Indies in 2000/01 he bowled a delivery which was clocked at 161.8 km/h (100.5 mph), but this was later shown to be an erroneous measurement of a 142 km/h delivery.

Early in his career, Lee was reported for a suspected illegal bowling action, but was cleared, and was also heavily criticised after bowling a series of beamers at batsmen during a number of ODIs in 2005. Captain Ricky Ponting defended Lee saying that it was not intentional. His slower balls also has dramatic falls of pace with varying length, often from a cutter grip, where it can go as slow as 100 km/h (62 mph), but it hovers on average around the 115–130 km/h (71–81 mph) range. He is also known to celebrate many bowled wickets with a chainsaw celebration.

=== Batting ===
Lee was a competent lower-order batsman. Together with Mike Hussey, he has held the record for highest 7th wicket partnership for Australia in ODIs since 2005–06 with 123. During the 2005 Ashes series, Lee had numerous defiant innings, including a stand of 43 not out in the Second Test at Edgbaston, Australia's highest individual score in that innings. This innings nearly won the match for Australia but the other batsman Michael Kasprowicz was caught behind by Geraint Jones and England won by just two runs. After the memorable match, England bowlers Steve Harmison and Andrew Flintoff went over to console Lee. The image of Flintoff consoling Lee was a moment which came to symbolise a hotly contested series.

On 2 April 2006, Lee hit his highest Test score of 64 in 68 balls against South Africa at Johannesburg. His previous highest score in Tests was 62 not out which he made against the West Indies in 2000 at the Gabba. Lee nearly surpassed this score on 3 January 2008 against India when he made 59 off 121 balls. Lee had also once again nearly surpassed his highest test score when he had made 63 not out, but unfortunately Ricky Ponting had declared the innings in the 2nd test against the West Indies. As a result of this, he fell one run short of his highest test score.

Lee's highest score in ODI matches is 59 against West Indies at West Indies in March 2012.

== Coaching career ==
Lee has worked as a bowling coach for Ireland and Sri Lanka.

== Awards ==
- 2000 Bradman Young Cricketer of the Year
- 1999–2000 Wisden Young Cricketer of the Year
- 2002–03 VB Series Player of the Series
- 2004–05 VB Series Player of the Series
- 2005 ICC Awards – ODI Team of the Year
- 2006 Wisden Cricketer of the Year
- 2006–07 DLF Cup Player of the Tournament
- 2006 ICC Awards – ODI Team of the Year
- Australia's Greatest ODI XI
- 2007 Warne-Muralitharan Trophy Player of the Series
- 2007–08 Border–Gavaskar Trophy Player of the Series
- 2008 McGilvray Medal
- 2008 Australian Test Player of the Year
- 2008 Allan Border Medal
- 2008 ICC Awards – ODI Team of the Year
- 2008 ICC Awards – Test Team of the Year
- 2009 Champions League Twenty20 Player of the Series

== Career highlights ==
=== Tests ===
- Lee's best Test bowling figures of five for 30 came against the West Indies at The Gabba, Brisbane in 2005
- Lee's 100th wicket was Marcus Trescothick in his 27th Test against England at Sydney in 2003
- Lee took his 200th wicket, Mark Boucher, in his 51st Test against South Africa at Durban in 2006
- His best batting score of 64 was made against South Africa, Johannesburg, 2006
- He made his 1,000th Test run in his 53rd Test against Bangladesh at Fatullah in 2006
- Lee's 250th wicket was Anil Kumble in his 62nd Test against India at Melbourne in 2007
- Lee's 300th wicket was Jamie How in his 73rd Test against New Zealand at Brisbane on 22 November 2008

=== One-day Internationals ===
ODI Debut: vs Pakistan, Gabba, Brisbane, 1999–2000

- His best ODI bowling figures of five for 22 came against South Africa at the Telstra Dome in Melbourne in 2006.
- His best ODI batting score of 59 was made against West Indies in 2012.
- His 100th ODI wicket was Andy Caddick, against England at the M.C.G. in 2003
- His 200th wicket was Marcus Trescothick, against England at Lord's in 2005
- His 300th wicket was Darren Sammy, against West Indies at St George's in 2008
- His 350th wicket was Nuwan Kulasekara, against Sri Lanka at Kandy in 2011, becoming just the second bowler in Australian history to get 350 wickets.
- Lee is the first (and currently the only) bowler to take 5 wickets twice in One Day Internationals played at Lord's

== Records ==
- Lee was the first player in Twenty20 International cricket to take a hat-trick.
- Lee is the second fastest Australian ODI player to take 100 wickets (after Mitchell Starc). He reached the milestone in his 55th match. He is fifth on the world list behind Mitchell Starc (52 matches), Saqlain Mushtaq (53 matches) and Shane Bond (54 matches)

== Career best performances ==
Bowling
| | Score | Fixture | Venue | Season |
|---|---|---|---|---|
| Test | 5/30 | Australia v West Indies | Gabba, Brisbane | 2005 |
| ODI | 5/22 | Australia v South Africa | Docklands Stadium, Melbourne | 2006 |
| T20I | 3/23 | West Indies v Australia | Kensington Oval, Bridgetown, Barbados | 2012 |
| FC | 7/114 | New South Wales v South Australia | SCG, Sydney | 2002 |
| LA | 5/22 | Australia v South Africa | Docklands Stadium, Melbourne | 2006 |
| T20 | 4/28 | Sydney Sixers v Perth Scorchers | SCG, Sydney | 2014 |

== Media work ==
After announcing his retirement from international cricket, Lee joined the Channel Nine cricket commentating team. He assisted author Michael Panckridge in the cricket-related Toby Jones novel series. In 2019, he performed in The Masked Singer Australia as Parrot, placing 11th in the leaderboard.

Lee was cast in the Indo-Australian film UnIndian opposite Tannishtha Chatterjee. The film was shot in Sydney. It was released in India in 2016 and had good takings at the box office.

== Personal life ==
Lee is the second of three sons born to Bob, a metallurgist, and Helen (née Buxton), a piano teacher, and grew up in the Shellharbour suburbs of Oak Flats and Mount Warrigal. His older brother Shane is a retired all rounder and former international and younger brother Grant previously played cricket for New South Wales U-19, and is now an accountant. Lee attended Balarang Public School and Oak Flats High School, which later named its cricket ground in his honour.

The brothers first played cricket together in front of their house using a tennis ball and the garage door as the "wicket-keeper". As a child he idolised Allan Donald and Dennis Lillee, the latter of whom would become a mentor to him as a teenager.

Lee has been known by his nicknames 'Binga', after the chain of electronics store Bing Lee, since his high-school days. He was once briefly nicknamed "Oswald" by former Australian captain and New South Wales teammate Steve Waugh during his early international career. During an ODI around 2000, he was in the batting order behind his brother Shane and Ian Harvey. When Waugh read out the batting order, instead of reading "Lee, Harvey, Lee", he read out "Lee, Harvey, Oswald" (Lee Harvey Oswald).

Lee married Elizabeth Kemp in June 2006. They have a son. After two years of marriage Lee confirmed his separation from Kemp and they divorced in 2009. At the time of the split, media speculation suggested Kemp was having an affair with a rugby player in Brisbane; however, this was later disputed, with extended periods of loneliness due to Lee's off-season commitments keeping him away from Kemp and his young son given as the reason for the marriage breakdown. He married Lana Anderson in 2014 after one year of dating; they have two children.

Lee is part of the rock band Six & Out. The band is made up of his brother Shane and former New South Wales cricketers Brad McNamara, Gavin Robertson and Richard Chee Quee. Lee plays the bass guitar or acoustic guitar for the band.

During the 2006 ICC Champions Trophy in India, Lee wrote the lyrics for "You're the One for Me" and recorded it with Indian singer Asha Bhosle. The song reached a peak position of number two on the Indian and South African charts. In 2008, he filmed scenes for his first Bollywood movie Victory.

In November 2011, Lee launched his autobiography, which he wrote with the help of author James Knight.

Politically, Lee is right wing. In September 2013, he tweeted his support for Tony Abbott, leader of the Liberal Party of Australia in the 2013 Australian federal election. He was approached by the Liberal Party to run as a candidate in the 2019 election. Lee again endorsed Abbott in the Division of Warringah in the election. In 2014, Lee was criticised after he signed bats for Indian politicians Rajnath Singh, and Sushma Swaraj. The bats were presented by immigration minister Scott Morrison as part of a deal by which India would agree to accept rejected Indian asylum seekers from Australia. Lee however stated that he was a strong supporter of human rights, and that signing these bats did not mean he was not a supporter of them.

== Charity work ==
Lee supports a number of charities including the Salvation Army, the Adventist Development and Relief Agency (ADRA) and the Make a Wish Foundation, in which Lee was named an 'Official Friend' in honour of his long-standing association with the foundation. He began supporting ADRA along with his brother Shane when a close friend committed suicide. In 2007, Lee initiated Mewsic, a charitable foundation in India which has established six music centres across the country.
