= Martin Love =

Australian cricketer (born 1974)

Personal information
- Full name: Martin Lloyd Love
- Born: 30 March 1974 (age 52); Mundubbera, Queensland, Australia
- Height: 1.83 m (6 ft 0 in)
- Batting: Right-handed
- Bowling: Right-arm off break
- Role: Batsman

International information
- National side: Australia
- Test debut (cap 385): 26 December 2002 v England
- Last Test: 28 July 2003 v Bangladesh

Domestic team information
- Years: Team
- 1992/93–2008/09: Queensland
- 2001–2003: Durham
- 2004–2005: Northamptonshire

Career statistics
Competition	Test	FC	LA	T20
Matches	5	214	155	6
Runs scored	233	16,952	4,545	166
Batting average	46.60	49.85	33.41	27.66
100s/50s	1/1	45/78	5/21	0/2
Top score	100*	300*	127*	53
Balls bowled	–	30	12	–
Wickets	–	1	0	–
Bowling average	–	11.00	–	–
5 wickets in innings	–	0	–	–
10 wickets in match	–	0	–	–
Best bowling	–	1/5	–	–
Catches/stumpings	7/–	268/–	68/–	0/–
- Source: CricketArchive, 25 January 2025

Martin Lloyd Love (born 30 March 1974) is a former Australian cricketer who played in five Test matches from 2002 to 2003. He was a right-handed batsman.

== Early life ==
Love was educated at Mundubbera State School and Toowoomba Grammar School. He graduated with a degree in physiotheraphy from The University of Queensland in 1997.

== Cricket ==
He made 146 for Queensland in the 1994–95 Sheffield Shield final when team won their first Shield for 68 years. In 2002 he set a Durham record by making 251. He improved on that with a 273 in 2003.

His Test debut was in the 2002–03 Ashes Series in Australia where he played in the 4th and 5th Tests, making 62*, 6*, 0 and 27. This was followed with a single Test in Barbados (36 & 2) and two Tests against Bangladesh in Australia in 2003 in which he made a duck and 100 not out. Martin Love signed a contract for Warwickshire CCC in October 2006, but injured himself before joining up with the squad and was subsequently replaced by Kumar Sangakkara

On Damien Martyn's return from injury, Love was dropped from the Test squad.

On 24 February, Love announced he would retire at the end of the 2008–09 Australian cricket season to pursue a career in physiotherapy. He scored 219 not out in his last home match, followed by 104 not out in his last Sheffield Shield innings against Victoria at Junction Oval. This gave Love the distinction of scoring an unbeaten century in both his final Test and first class innings.
