= Brad Hogg =

Australian cricketer

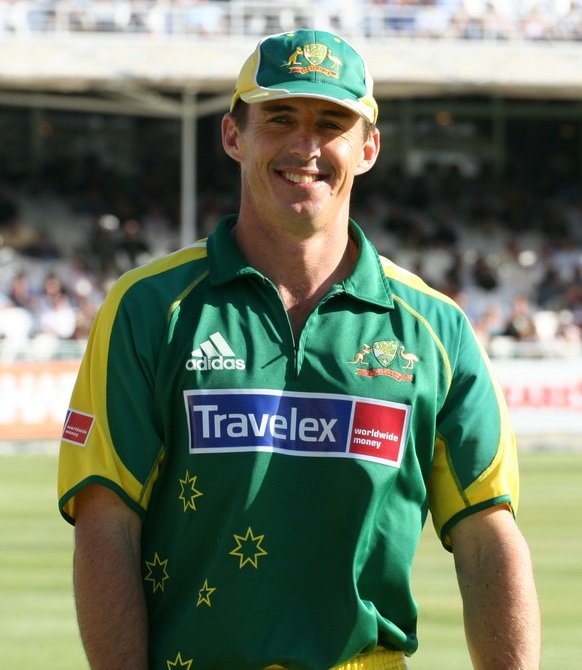

Personal information
- Full name: George Bradley Hogg
- Born: 6 February 1971 (age 55); Narrogin, Western Australia
- Nickname: George, Hoggie, Docker
- Height: 1.80 m (5 ft 11 in)
- Batting: Left-handed
- Bowling: Left-arm wrist spin
- Role: All-rounder

International information
- National side: Australia (1996–2014)
- Test debut (cap 367): 10 October 1996 v India
- Last Test: 24 January 2008 v India
- ODI debut (cap 126): 26 August 1996 v Zimbabwe
- Last ODI: 2 March 2008 v India
- ODI shirt no.: 31
- T20I debut (cap 18): 24 February 2006 v South Africa
- Last T20I: 23 March 2014 v Pakistan
- T20I shirt no.: 31 / 71

Domestic team information
- Years: Team
- 1993/94–2007/08: Western Australia
- 2004: Warwickshire
- 2011/12–2015/16: Perth Scorchers
- 2012: Sylhet Royals
- 2012: Cape Cobras
- 2012–2013: Rajasthan Royals
- 2012: Wayamba Wolves
- 2014: Antigua Hawksbills
- 2015–2016: Kolkata Knight Riders
- 2016/17–2017/18: Melbourne Renegades

Career statistics
Competition	Test	ODI	FC	LA
Matches	7	123	99	233
Runs scored	186	790	3,992	2,606
Batting average	26.57	20.25	35.01	26.32
100s/50s	0/1	0/2	4/27	0/6
Top score	79	71*	158	94*
Balls bowled	1,524	5,564	13,488	9,298
Wickets	17	156	181	257
Bowling average	54.88	26.84	40.51	28.06
5 wickets in innings	0	2	9	3
10 wickets in match	0	0	0	0
Best bowling	2/40	5/32	6/44	5/23
Catches/stumpings	1/–	36/–	55/–	81/–
Medal record
Men's Cricket
Representing Australia
ICC Cricket World Cup
Winner	2003 South Africa-Zimbabwe-Kenya
Winner	2007 West Indies
ICC Champions Trophy
Winner	2006 India
Commonwealth Games
Silver medal – second place	1998 Kuala Lumpur
- Source: ESPNcricinfo, 11 October 2017

George Bradley Hogg (born 6 February 1971) is a former Australian cricketer who played all formats of the game. He was a left-arm wrist spin bowler, and a lower-order left-handed batsman.

His earlier international career was revitalised by Shane Warne's absence from cricket in 2003 due to suspension from a drugs test and subsequent retirement from one-day cricket. He is Australia's eleventh most successful One Day International bowler and third most successful spinner in terms of wickets taken. He retired from International cricket on 4 March 2008 after the 2007–08 Commonwealth Bank Series. With his time representing Australia, Hogg won multiple ICC titles with the team: the 2003 Cricket World Cup, the 2007 Cricket World Cup, and the 2006 ICC Champions Trophy.

In a surprise comeback to the Twenty20 (T20) format at the inaugural Big Bash League in 2011, Hogg became a cult hero of the short form, bringing about a call-up to the 2012 and 2014 T20 World Cup Australia teams, as well as international T20 contracts around the world. Hogg is the only player over 40 years of age to take 100 wickets in the T20 format.

Hogg released The Wrong'Un, an autobiography with Greg Growden, in November 2016 and enjoys a career as a cricket commentator and has become a popular media personality between cricket commitments.

== Early life and career ==
Hogg grew up on a sheep farm in Williams, Western Australia and is a former pupil of Aquinas College, Perth. Later, he completed a Bachelor of Commerce majoring in Accounting & Marketing at Curtin University. Hogg made his first-class cricket and domestic limited overs debut for Western Australia in February 1994 as a middle order batsman. He did not begin to bowl left-arm wrist-spin until former Australian test leg-spinner Tony Mann asked him to bowl them in the nets as preparation for the batsmen to face NSW spinner David Freedman. In 1999 he made a brief foray in umpiring Australian rules football, making his way up to Westar Rules Colts (under 18) level. At the age of 45 years and 92 days he was the oldest to play in the IPL.

== International career ==
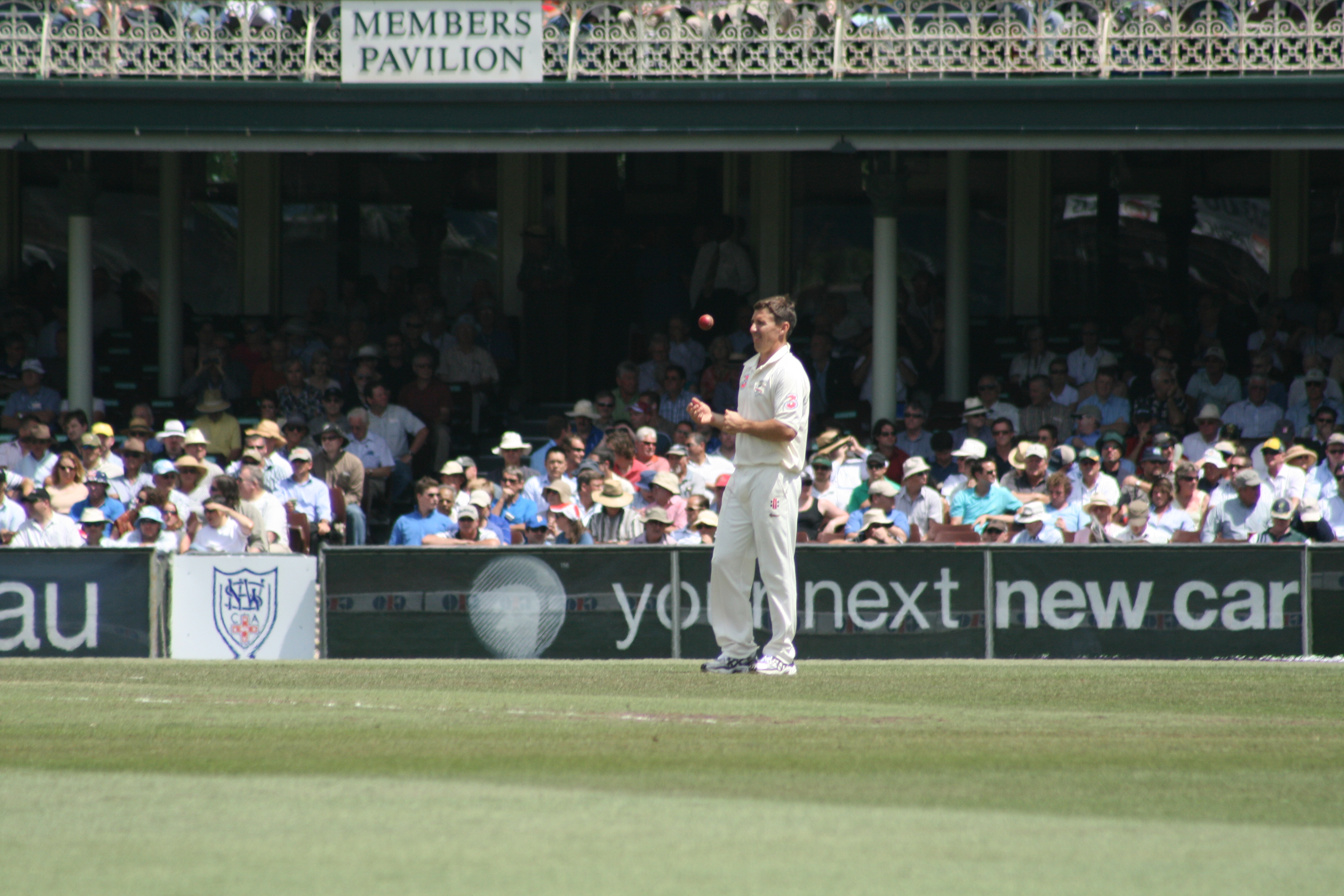
Brad Hogg bowling at SCG, in 2008

In 1996, he was selected in the Australian team to tour India as a replacement for Warne who was injured. He made his Test debut against India in Delhi, taking 1/69 and making 1 and 4. He also played seven One Day International matches. However, the belief at the time was that he was merely a place-holder for Warne and he was discarded from the international squad for some time. Hogg was also in and out of the Western Australian squad for the next few years as he struggled for form. Hogg was absent from the international scene until called up to replace Warne during the 2002–03 VB Series (an annual tri-nations one day tournament in Australia) after Warne injured his shoulder. However, Warne then tested positive to a banned diuretic in a pre-World Cup drugs test, leaving Hogg to play as Australia's specialist spinner in Australia's Cup winning team and filled that role until his own retirement, this was due to Warne's retirement from the one day game.

Hogg was recalled to the Australian Test team to tour the West Indies in April 2003, where he played two matches. The gap of 78 games between his Test appearances is the equal-longest such run for an Australian. He also played against Zimbabwe at the SCG later that year, but was upstaged by part-time slow left-arm wrist-spin Simon Katich, who took 6/90 for the match (Hogg took 3/119). He was left out of the Test team in 2004 but remained in the national one day team as the preferred spinner to Stuart MacGill. In 2005–06, he became a one-day only player with Western Australian selectors preferring to play young spinner Beau Casson ahead of Hogg in the state's Pura Cup team. However, with Casson's move to New South Wales in 2006–07, Hogg regained his place in the first-class team. In 2007–08, after a four-year layoff, Hogg was recalled to Test cricket to play against India after Stuart MacGill had to withdraw from the team due to suffering from carpal tunnel syndrome in his bowling hand.

During the second Test against India in Sydney in January 2008, Hogg scored a Test-career-best 79 as part of a 173-run partnership with Andrew Symonds — a 7th wicket record for both the Sydney Cricket Ground and Australia vs. India. It was alleged that in that match Hogg called the Indian captain Anil Kumble and vice-captain Mahendra Singh Dhoni "bastards". Hogg faced a ban of between two and four Test matches after being charged with the level three offence under the International Cricket Council's Code of conduct which refers to abuse by reference to a player's "race, religion, gender, colour, descent, or national or ethnic origin." The hearing was set to take place on 14 January in Perth, but the BCCI dropped the charges a few days later.

Hogg's highest ODI score is 71 not out against England, and his best bowling figures in an innings are 5/32 against the West Indies. Hogg is a noted fitness fanatic, scoring the highest beep test result in the Australian team in 2005, with a score of 14.6.

On 27 February 2008, Hogg announced his retirement from international cricket, effective after the Commonwealth Bank Series. His test career (17 wickets at 54.88) was ultimately unremarkable, but his 156 One Day International wickets at 26.84 coupled with useful lower-order batting placed him among Australia's best one-day players.

== Coaching career ==
In September 2011, Hogg was appointed coaching director of Cricket PNG and head coach of the Papua New Guinea national cricket team, replacing fellow Australian Andy Bichel. He was due to coach the team at the 2012 ICC World Twenty20 Qualifier, but resigned in January 2012 after being recalled to play for Australia.

== Return to playing ==
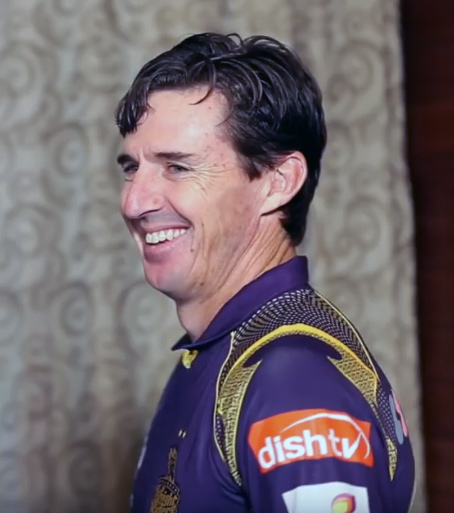
Brad Hogg in IPL (2015)

On 4 November 2011, Hogg signed with the Perth Scorchers, one of the franchises in the Australian domestic Twenty20 competition, the Big Bash League. He took 12 wickets in the tournament at an average of 13.5, better than any other spinner in the competition bettered in wickets only by James Faulkner and Rana Naved-ul-Hasan. On 23 January 2012, on the back of his form with the Scorchers, Hogg earned a recall to the Australian Twenty20 squad. He also played for Sylhet Royals in the inaugural Bangladesh Premier League, Cape Cobras in South Africa, Rajasthan Royals in the Indian Premier League, and in Sri Lanka.

On 1 February 2012, Hogg returned to international cricket at the Sydney Olympic Stadium in a Twenty20 international against India, returning figures of one wicket (that of Virat Kohli) for 21 runs from four overs. In the second match of the Twenty20 series at the Melbourne Cricket Ground, he took the wicket of Virender Sehwag in his first over, and ended up with bowling figures of 1/19.

Hogg has since been selected for the 2014 Australian T20 World Cup team, plus the three games against Pakistan in Dubai in the leadup to that competition.

On 7 February 2014, Hogg was man of the match in the winning Big Bash final with his team the Perth Scorchers. Over the tournament, Hogg had an economy rate of 6.19, the fifth best by a spinner in the tournament. This earned him a recall to the Australian T20I team for the series in South Africa and the 2014 ICC World Twenty20. On 12 March that year he became the oldest player to play in T20I's, at 43 years and 34 days.

He was bought by the Kolkata Knight Riders at the 2015 IPL auction as a backup to replace Narine who was sidelined halfway into the season due to 'suspect bowling action'. Hogg triumphed in the role and took 9 wickets in six games, and won two-man of the match awards before Narine assumed his position in the team again.

On 28 April 2015, he became the oldest player ever to feature in an IPL match when he played against Chennai Super Kings at the age of 44 years and 81 days.

He made headlines again in 2015 when he re-signed for the 2015/16 Perth Scorchers team in the BBL with his unique comedy announcement.

Hogg made the surprising move from the Perth Scorchers to the Melbourne Renegades for BBL06. Approaching BBL08, he was left unsigned and has not featured in any form of cricket since. The Melbourne Renegades ultimately won the title that season.

== Playing style ==
He is one of the few bowlers who bowls left-arm wrist spin in international cricket. He has an excellent wrong'un and a well-disguised flipper, which he used to bowl Andy Flower, who was then considered to be one of the world's best at playing spin bowling, during the 2003 World Cup. In his book, Walking to Victory, Adam Gilchrist described it as "one of the balls of the tournament." During the 2007 Cricket World Cup, Hogg beat Andrew Flintoff with two consecutive wrong'uns, with the second one resulting in Flintoff being given out stumped.

Hogg is well known for his use of his tongue while bowling, poking it out just before he bowls, which was considered his trademark.
