= Andy Bichel =

Australian cricketer

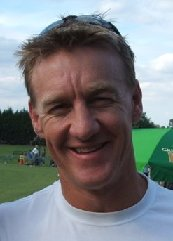

Personal information
- Full name: Andrew John Bichel
- Born: 27 August 1970 (age 56); Laidley, Queensland, Australia
- Nickname: Bic
- Height: 1.82 m (6 ft 0 in)
- Batting: Right-handed
- Bowling: Right-arm fast-medium
- Role: Bowler

International information
- National side: Australia (1997–2004)
- Test debut (cap 371): 25 January 1997 v West Indies
- Last Test: 12 December 2003 v India
- ODI debut (cap 130): 5 January 1997 v West Indies
- Last ODI: 1 February 2004 v India

Domestic team information
- Years: Team
- 1992/93–2007/08: Queensland
- 2001–2004: Worcestershire
- 2005: Hampshire
- 2006–2007: Essex

Career statistics
Competition	Test	ODI	FC	LA
Matches	19	67	186	235
Runs scored	355	471	5,860	2,491
Batting average	16.90	20.47	26.51	20.58
100s/50s	0/1	0/1	9/23	1/5
Top score	71	64	148	100
Balls bowled	3,337	3,257	37,197	11,433
Wickets	58	78	769	320
Bowling average	32.24	31.57	25.98	26.13
5 wickets in innings	1	2	36	4
10 wickets in match	0	0	7	0
Best bowling	5/60	7/20	9/93	7/20
Catches/stumpings	16/–	19/–	91/–	73/–
Medal record
Men's Cricket
Representing Australia
ICC Cricket World Cup
Winner	2003 South Africa-Zimbabwe-Kenya
Commonwealth Games
Silver medal – second place	1998 Kuala Lumpur
- Source: Cricinfo, 13 May 2017

Andrew John Bichel (born 27 August 1970) is a former Australian cricketer, who played 19 Test matches and 67 One Day Internationals for Australia between 1997 and 2004. He was a right-arm fast-medium bowler, but was also a hard-hitting lower-order batsman. Bichel was a member of the Australian team who won the 2003 Cricket World Cup.

Bichel represented Queensland in the Australian domestic competitions. He also played for Worcestershire, Hampshire and Essex in English county cricket.

Since retiring from playing, Bichel has been a coach and a selector. He is a cousin of Chris Sabburg.

== Personal life ==
Bichel was born to parents of German ancestry, married Dion in 1997 and they have two children.

== Domestic career ==
As well as Queensland's state team, he has played for the English Counties Essex, Hampshire and Worcestershire, where he had successful sessions on Essex with the bat and ball. Professional Walsden Cricket Club in the Central Lancashire League

== International career ==
=== Early years ===
Bichel made his Test debut for Australia in Adelaide in 1996 in a match against the West Indies, and his one-day international debut in Brisbane in the same year, also against the West Indies.

His rise to prominence coincided with the emergence of a young Brett Lee, with whom he was, for many years, often in a battle with Lee for the third fast-bowler spot in the Australian line-up behind Glenn McGrath and Jason Gillespie. As the younger and pacier Lee was often selected ahead of him, Bichel now holds the Test match record of being twelfth man for Australia on 19 occasions. He would later claim that his bowling suffered during these times, as he missed out on the valuable match practice that he could have earned either playing for Australia or Queensland.

=== 2003 Cricket World Cup ===
A highlight of Bichel's career was Australia's 2003 World Cup campaign. He was initially back up to Jason Gillespie, Brett Lee and Glenn McGrath, playing his first game against Netherlands and making a good impression with the ball. However, after injury prematurely ended Gillespie's World Cup tournament, Bichel took over his position in the side. Bichel would go on to retrieve Australia from serious trouble on more than one occasion, most notably with figures of 7–20 against England. This bowling performance became the best-ever figures against England in ODIs, the best bowling at St George's Park in ODIs, and the best bowling in a World Cup match as well.

In the same match, he also played a crucial role with the bat, combining with Michael Bevan for an unbeaten 73-run ninth-wicket partnership to ease Australia to victory, with Bichel finishing on 34 not out. Similarly, in the Super Six stage, he came to the crease with Australia floundering at just 84–7 against New Zealand. Bichel and Bevan again saved Australia, with Bichel registering his highest score of 64 as Australia put up a winning total batting first. In the semi-final against Sri Lanka, he bowled tightly, conceding only 0–18 in 10 overs but his fielding pressure caused the spectacular run out of Aravinda de Silva as Bichel picked up, spun around and threw down the stumps to prevent a tight single off his own bowling. In the final against India, he picked up one wicket, bowling Rahul Dravid, as Australia won, completing an undefeated campaign.

== Injury and retirement ==
At the start of the 2004–05 Australian summer, Bichel was not offered a contract by Cricket Australia, an indication that its selectors did not realistically believe he would represent Australia in that season. His performances in the domestic competition, however, continued to be at the same high standards as before and it was clear he wanted to make another return to the international scene. Bichel's bowling at state level during the 2004–05 domestic season earned him the Domestic Player of the Year award at the 2005 Australian cricket awards.

However, he announced his retirement on 9 February 2009, saying he never fully recovered from his shoulder injury.

== Post-retirement ==
Chennai Super Kings, the IPL Champions of 2010 season, acquired Andy Bichel's services as a bowling coach for the team's youngsters for IPL 2011 season. He was later the coach of Papua New Guinea. On 11 November 2011, it was announced that Andy Bichel would join the Cricket Australia selection panel.

In 2014 it was announced that Bichel had partnered Tangalooma Island Resort to be an official brand ambassador.
