= Matthew Hayden =

Australian cricketer (born 1971)

Matthew Hayden AM
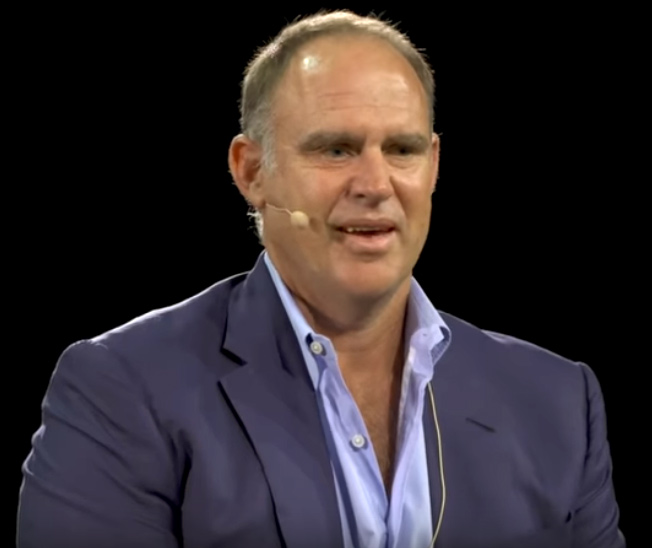
- Hayden in 2018

Personal information
- Full name: Matthew Lawrence Hayden
- Born: 29 October 1971 (age 55); Kingaroy, Queensland, Australia
- Nickname: Haydos, Unit
- Height: 188 cm (6 ft 2 in)
- Batting: Left-handed
- Bowling: Right-arm fast-medium
- Role: Opening batsman
- Website: https://www.matthewhayden.com/

International information
- National side: Australia (1993–2009)
- Test debut (cap 359): 4 March 1994 v South Africa
- Last Test: 3 January 2009 v South Africa
- ODI debut (cap 111): 19 May 1993 v England
- Last ODI: 4 March 2008 v India
- ODI shirt no.: 28
- T20I debut (cap 13): 13 June 2005 v England
- Last T20I: 20 October 2007 v India

Domestic team information
- Years: Team
- 1991/92–2007/08: Queensland
- 1997: Hampshire
- 1999–2000: Northamptonshire
- 2008–2010: Chennai Super Kings
- 2011/12: Brisbane Heat

Career statistics
Competition	Test	ODI	FC	LA
Matches	103	161	295	308
Runs scored	8,625	6,133	24,603	12,051
Batting average	50.73	43.80	52.57	44.63
100s/50s	30/29	10/36	79/100	27/67
Top score	380	181*	380	181*
Balls bowled	54	6	1,097	339
Wickets	0	0	17	10
Bowling average	–	–	39.47	35.80
5 wickets in innings	–	–	0	0
10 wickets in match	–	–	0	0
Best bowling	–	–	3/10	2/16
Catches/stumpings	128/–	68/–	296/–	129/–
Medal record
Men's Cricket
Representing Australia
ICC Cricket World Cup
Winner	2003 South Africa-Zimbabwe-Kenya
Winner	2007 West Indies
- Source: ESPNcricinfo, 17 August 2017

Matthew Lawrence Hayden AM (born 29 October 1971) is an Australian cricket commentator and former cricketer. His playing career spanned fifteen years. Hayden was a powerful and aggressive left-handed opening batsman who, along with opening partners Justin Langer and Adam Gilchrist, contributed heavily to Australia's success during its "golden era" (2000–2008) in Test and ODI (One Day International) cricket respectively. He holds the record of highest individual score by an Australian batsman in Tests, having scored 380 against Zimbabwe during Zimbabwe's 2003 tour of Australia. This stands as the second-highest individual score in test cricket (behind Brian Lara‘s 400*). It is the highest score by an opening batsman in Tests. Hayden was a member of the Australian team that won both the 2003 Cricket World Cup, and the 2007 Cricket World Cup.

Domestically, Hayden played for the state he was born in, Queensland, and also played for the state's Twenty20 (T20) competition team, the Brisbane Heat. Hayden retired from all forms of cricket in September 2012. In 2017, Hayden was inducted into the Australian Cricket Hall of Fame. In September 2021, Hayden was appointed as the Batting Coach of Pakistan for the 2021 ICC Men's T20 World Cup.

== Personal life and beyond cricket ==
Hayden competed in the Gladiator Team Sports Challenge in 1995. Hayden's boat capsized near North Stradbroke Island; he and his two companions (one of whom was Queensland and Australian teammate Andrew Symonds and the other was Trent Butler) were forced to swim a kilometre to safety. Hayden subsequently appeared in a campaign promoting marine safety. In his spare time, Hayden is a keen cook and occasionally prepared meals for his teammates while on tour. A collection of his recipes was published in Australia in 2004 as The Matthew Hayden Cookbook. A second book, The Matthew Hayden Cookbook 2, was published in 2006. Prior to using a Mongoose, Hayden used a Gray-Nicolls bat with a fluorescent pink grip, to highlight and support research into a cure for breast cancer. This is at least in part inspired by his teammate Glenn McGrath's wife, who died due to breast cancer. He is married to Kellie and has three children

Hayden is a devout Roman Catholic and said, "When I’m in trouble, I ask: ‘What would Christ do?'" He also routinely crossed himself on the field after reaching a century. When asked about faith in modern society, Hayden said, "I think it’s very challenging to live as a Christian, or any sort of religion, in terms of modern day society. I think it’s very difficult as a young adult, and I think I really struggled with that over a long period of time". Hayden was awarded the Australian Sports Medal on 14 July 2000. In 2009, as part of the Q150 celebrations, Matthew Hayden was announced as one of the Q150 Icons of Queensland for his role as a "sports legend". On 26 January 2010 he was appointed a Member of the Order of Australia for service to cricket, and to the community through support for a range of health, youth and charitable organisations. Hayden is an Ambassador for the Australian Indigenous Education Foundation.

== Domestic career ==
=== First-class career ===
Hayden played Sheffield Shield cricket for Queensland, playing 101 matches, and scoring 8831 runs at an average of 54.85. He also played in the English County Championship, first with Hampshire in 1997 and prominently as captain of Northamptonshire in 1999–2000; his County record is 3461 runs at 55.82. Hayden's first-class career yielded 24,603 runs at an average of 52.57.

=== Twenty20 (T20) career ===
Matthew Hayden played for the Chennai Super Kings in the inaugural Indian Premier League (IPL) in April 2008, contracted for $375,000. Hayden became one of the foremost players in the league, and in 2009 won the Orange Cap as the season's highest run-scorer, with 572 runs.

In 2011–12, Hayden resigned from his positions on the Queensland and Australian cricket boards to take part for the Brisbane Heat in Australia's Big Bash League.

On 11 March 2010, Hayden announced his intention to use the Mongoose Cricket Bat, a bat specially tailored to the needs of Twenty20 cricket, during the 2010 IPL. Reactions to the bat were mixed. Stuart Law said that he would think 'twice' before using the Mongoose, while MS Dhoni said in his column that he believed in Hayden's ability 'no matter what means he uses'. After a quiet start to the third edition of the IPL, Hayden scored 93 off 43 deliveries to kickstart his campaign.

== International career ==
=== Test career ===
Hayden and Michael Slater were both picked for the 1993 tour of England, but Slater performed better in the tour games, and secured the opening position alongside vice-captain Mark Taylor for the next few years. Hayden played a single test in the 4–8 March 1994 Test Match against South Africa in Johannesburg, scoring 15 and 5, filling in for an injured Taylor.

His next Test selection was in the 1996–97 season, with three tests each against the West Indies and South Africa. He made his maiden century (125 against the West Indies in Adelaide), but averaged only 24.1 over the six tests, including four ducks. He was dropped from the team, as the selectors favoured other openers, initially Taylor and Matthew Elliott, then later Slater and Greg Blewett, for the next few years. At the time, he was compared occasionally to Graeme Hick, a fine domestic performer but not quite good enough to make it at the highest level.

During these years, Hayden was a prolific batsman for the Queensland first-class cricket team. Weight of domestic cricket runs, and persistence, resulted in a resurrection of his international career for the 1999–2000 tour of New Zealand and the following 2000–01 summer against the West Indies. His results in those series were unconvincing, but he was still picked for the 2001 tour of India.

On that tour of India, Hayden scored 549 runs, an Australian record for a three-Test series, at an average of 109.80. Before the 2001 India tour, Hayden averaged 24.36 from 13 Tests, with one century. After that, he was an automatic selection for the Test team. He scored over 1,000 Test runs in 2001, 2002, 2003, 2004, and 2005, the first man to achieve the feat five times. He was selected as one of Wisden's five 2003 Cricketers of the Year.

In the first innings of the First Test against Zimbabwe on 10 October 2003 at the WACA, Hayden scored 380 runs from only 437 balls to set a new world record for an individual Test innings, passing the previous record of Brian Lara (375), set in April 1994. Hayden's total remained the record until 12 April 2004, when Lara scored 400 not out. As of June 2024, it remains the second-highest innings in Test history, and is the highest ever by an Australian. For his performances in 2004, he was named in the World Test XI by ICC.

Hayden suffered a considerable form-slump towards the end of 2004, and went for sixteen consecutive tests without scoring a century. This continued into the highly anticipated 2005 Ashes, where Hayden failed to reach 40 in any of the first four tests, which put pressure on his position in the team; a hard-fought 138 from 303 balls in the Fifth Test at The Oval arguably saved his career. This signalled a return to form for Hayden for the 2005/06 season, and he scored centuries in four consecutive Tests, including the Oval Test, then home Tests against the ICC World XI and West Indies.

Hayden's form in the 2006-07 Ashes series against England was average; he failed to reach 40 in the first three innings of the series, but again returned to form with scores of 92 in Perth, and 153 in the Boxing Day Test. For his performances in 2006, he was again named in the World Test XI by ICC.

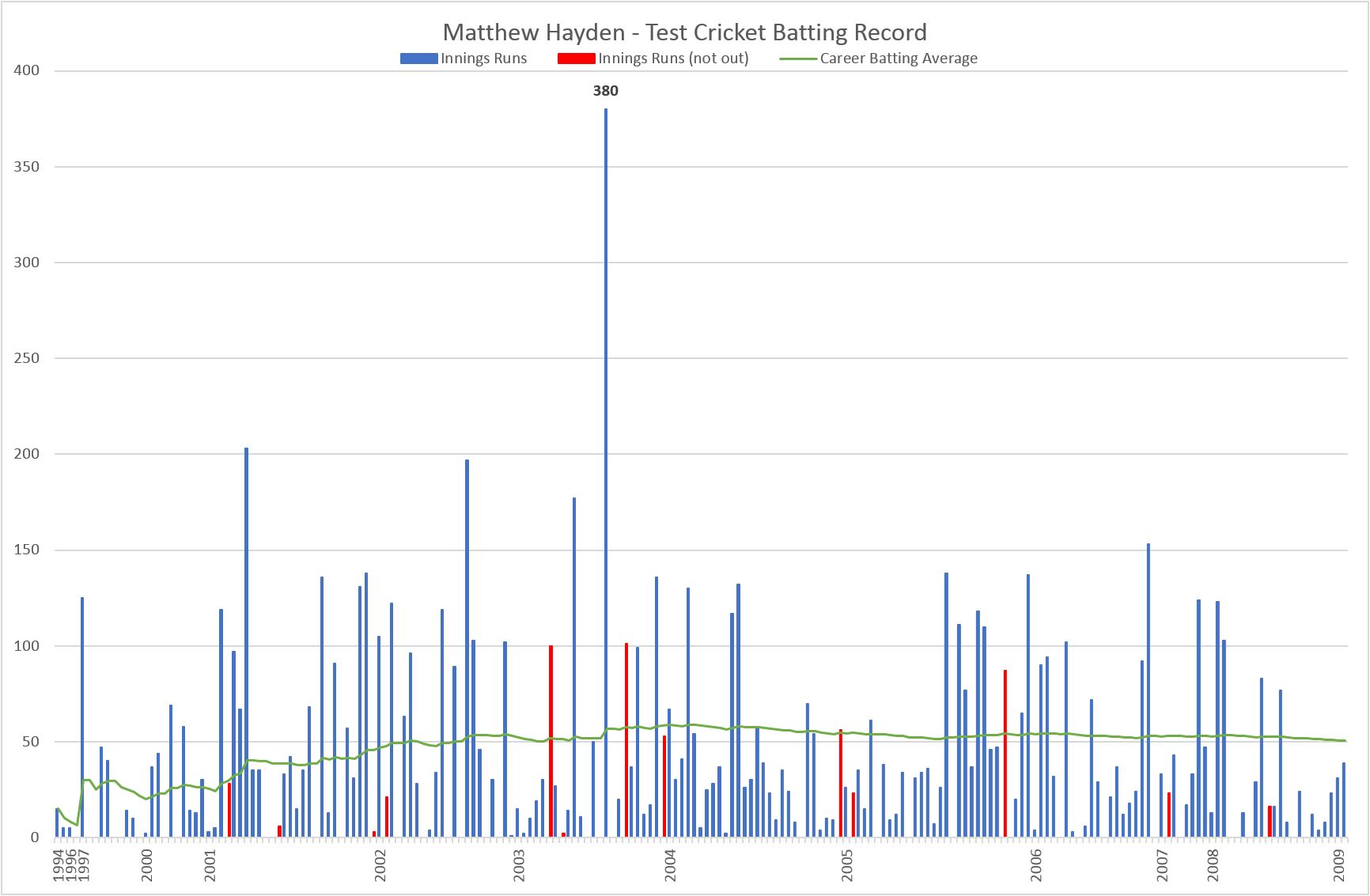
This is the complete graphical representation of the test cricket record of Matthew Hayden. Individual innings are represented by the blue and red (not out) bars; the green line is his career batting average. Current as of 8 January 2019.

Hayden scored 30 centuries in his 103 tests. As of January 2025, this makes him one of only four Australians to have scored more test centuries than Don Bradman (29 centuries in 52 tests), the other three being Ricky Ponting, Steve Waugh and Steve Smith. He also scored 29 half-centuries in Tests.

In 2007–2008, Hayden became the third Australian, after Donald Bradman (four centuries in five Tests in 1947–48) and David Boon (three tons in five Tests in 1991–92) to register three or more hundreds in a Test series against India. For his performances in 2007, he was named in the World Test XI by ICC.

Hayden has recorded three or more centuries in successive Tests three times: 2001–02 season, he registered four centuries in successive Tests against South Africa, at Adelaide, Melbourne, Sydney and Johannesburg; during 2005–06 with centuries against England at The Oval in 2005, against a World XI at Sydney, and against the West Indies at Brisbane and Hobart in 2005–06; and in 2007–2008 he scored three centuries in successive Tests against India.

The 2008–09 season was Hayden's final season of Test cricket. In nine Tests against India, New Zealand and South Africa, Hayden managed only 383 runs at 23.94, with two half-centuries and three ducks. His career ended when he was dropped from the ODI Australian team. Soon after Hayden announced his retirement from all international and first-class cricket prior to the tour of South Africa in 2008–09. His place was filled by young New South Wales opener Phillip Hughes. He finished his test career with 8625 runs at an average of 50.73.

Hayden's most notable opening batting partner was Justin Langer. The opening pair represented Australia in more than 100 Test innings. The pair made 5654 runs while batting together in opening partnerships, with an average of 51.88 runs per partnership; as of January 2019, only Gordon Greenidge and Desmond Haynes of the West Indies have scored more Test runs as an opening partnership, with 6,482 at an average of 47.31.

Hayden was a regular and successful slip fielder for Australia, and he took 128 catches during his Test career.

=== ODI career ===
Hayden played as an opening batsman in the Australian team in 160 One Day Internationals throughout his career. He made his ODI debut for Australia in 1993 against England, but after playing 13 ODIs in 1993 and 1994, he was dropped from the team until 2000.

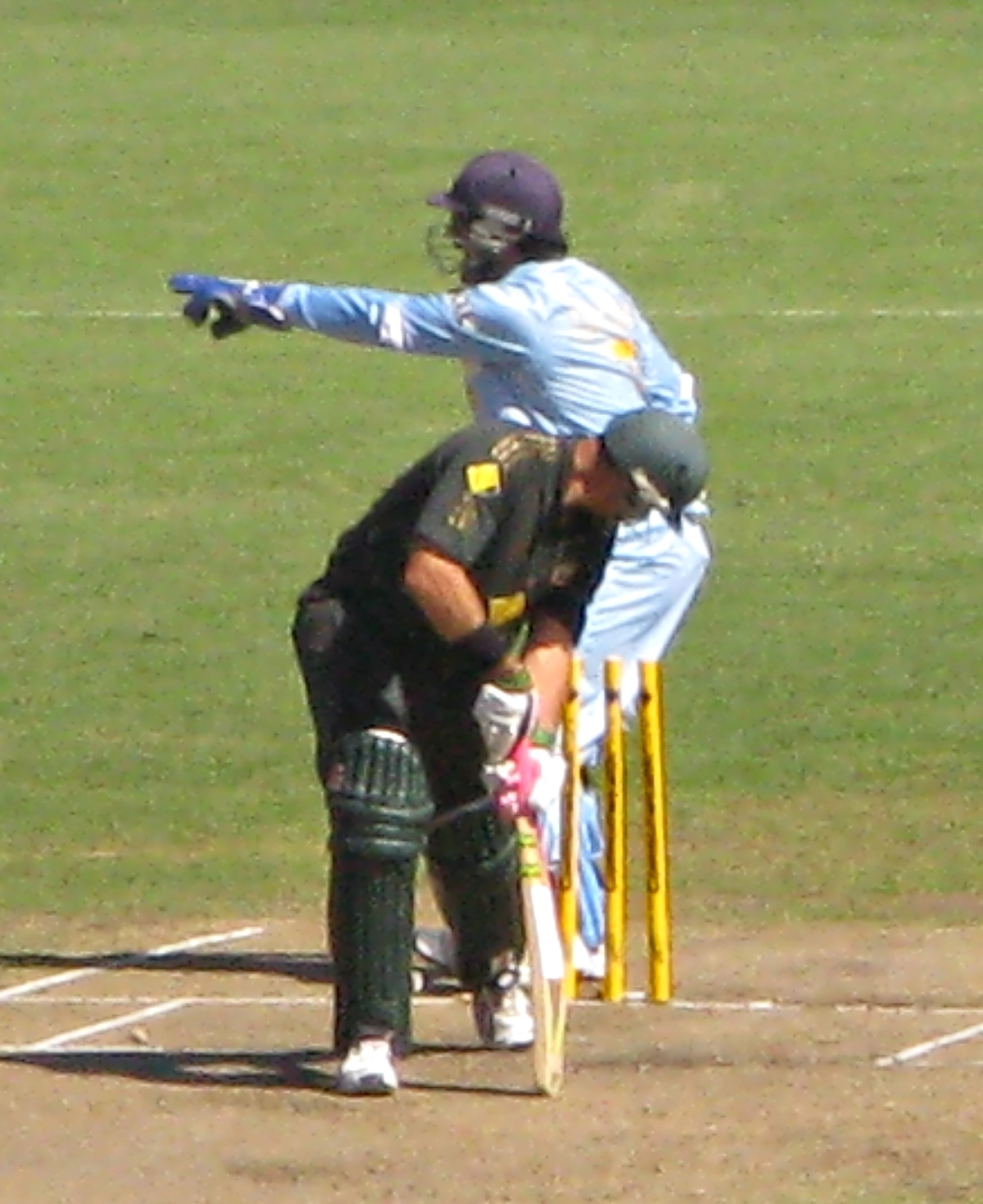
Hayden survives an appeal for a stumping by MS Dhoni in his last ODI, March 2008.

Hayden played in the Australian team that won the 2003 One Day International Cricket World Cup. He was dropped from the ODI squad because of poor form after The Ashes in 2005, but returned to the Australian squad in the 2006–07 Australian season after Simon Katich fell out of favour and Shane Watson was injured.

On 20 February 2007, Matthew Hayden posted his highest ODI score (181 not out) against New Zealand at Seddon Park in Hamilton. It was at the time the highest ODI score ever by an Australian and gave Hayden the unique distinction of holding both the Test and ODI record scores for an Australian batsman until the ODI record was broken by Shane Watson who scored 185* in 2011. His knock of 181* is the second highest ODI innings in a losing cause in ODI history just after Charles Coventry's 194*.

He dominated the 2007 Cricket World Cup in the West Indies the tournament's best batsman, scoring three centuries before the completion of the Super 8s section of the tournament; he was only the third person to achieve this feat (the previous being Mark Waugh and Sourav Ganguly). The century against South Africa came off just 66 balls and broke John Davison's record for the fastest century in a World Cup. The Prime Minister of St Kitts and Nevis awarded Hayden with honorary citizenship after the match. His record was broken by Irish batsman Kevin O'Brien in the 2011 World Cup when he struck a century off 50 balls against England. Hayden also became only the second player in World Cup history to surpass 600 runs in a single tournament; he scored 659 runs for the tournament at an average of 73.22. In September 2007, Hayden was named ODI Player of the Year after his dominating performance throughout the World Cup. He was named in the 'Team of the Tournament' by ESPNcricinfo. For his performances in 2007, he was named in the World ODI XI by the ICC and ESPNcricinfo.

Hayden played only one more season of ODI cricket, his last match for Australia being the second final of the 2007–08 Commonwealth Bank Series.

=== Twenty20 Internationals ===
Hayden played nine Twenty20 Internationals for Australia, including the 2007 ICC World Twenty20. He was the tournament's top scorer, with 265 runs. He scored 308 runs in T20Is with the average of 51.33 when retiring. He was named in the 'Team of the Tournament' by ESPNcricinfo for the 2007 T20I World Cup.

For his performances in 2007, he was named in the World T20I XI by ESPNcricinfo.

== Controversies ==
In the 2003 New Year's Test in Sydney against England, Hayden smashed a pavilion window in anger, after disagreeing with an umpire's decision to give him out. He was fined for this incident.

He was a party to the controversy that emerged from the Second Test, 2007-08 Border-Gavaskar Trophy racism charges pressed by Australia against India, and was one of the witnesses for Andrew Symonds's charges against Harbhajan Singh. As a fallout of that instance in February 2008, Hayden was charged for a code of conduct violation by Cricket Australia, for calling the Indian spinner Harbhajan Singh an "obnoxious little weed", and for inviting Indian fast bowler Ishant Sharma for a boxing bout, during an interview aired on Brisbane radio station. He was reprimanded for his comment by Cricket Australia, but maintained his innocence.

He was strongly criticised by the BCCI and former Pakistan team captain Wasim Akram for reportedly calling India a third world country. Back home after a 2–0 series defeat by India, Hayden spoke about what he perceived to be poor ground conditions and inordinate delays during the matches "that happen in Third World countries". However, Hayden defended his remarks.

== International retirement ==
On 13 January 2009, Hayden held a press conference at the Gabba and officially announced his retirement from representative cricket. The announcement followed a series of relatively poor performances in New Zealand and South Africa's tour of Australia, in which he failed to pass fifteen runs in nine innings. Paying tribute on his retirement, Hayden was hailed by teammates Ricky Ponting and Justin Langer as being the greatest ever opener from Australia. Hayden was recognised as statistically the best opener ever produced by the country.

Hayden was appointed by the Queensland Government in March 2013 to head a tourism campaign aiming to attract more Indian tourists to Australia.

== Career best performances ==
	Batting			
	Score	Fixture	Venue	Season
Test	380	Australia v Zimbabwe	WACA, Perth	2003
ODI	181*	New Zealand v Australia	Seddon Park, Hamilton	2007
T20I	73*	Australia v Bangladesh	Newlands Cricket Ground, Cape Town	2007
FC	380	Australia v Zimbabwe	WACA, Perth	2003
LA	181*	New Zealand v Australia	Seddon Park, Hamilton	2007
T20	93	Delhi Daredevils v Chennai Super Kings	Feroz Shah Kotla Ground, Delhi	2010

== International centuries ==
With 30 Tests and 10 ODI centuries, Hayden is considered one of the best Australian openers of his era. He also scored 29 Test, 36 ODI and three T20I half-centuries.

== Post-retirement ==
Hayden has also been working with Cricket Australia in raising the profile of cricket among the indigenous population of Australia. In 2010, he captained the Indigenous All-stars XI against the ACA Masters XI as part of the Imparja Cup held in Alice Springs, Northern Territory. Hayden is also an Ambassador of the Australian Indigenous Education Foundation.

He was inducted into Australian Cricket Hall of Fame at the 2016/17 Allan Border Medal ceremony in Sydney. On September 13, 2021, he was announced as a head coach of Pakistan for 2021 T20 World Cup. This was his first major coaching assignment. In September 2022, he was appointed as the Pakistan team's mentor for 2022 T20 World Cup.

Records
Preceded by Brian Lara	World Record – Highest individual score in Test cricket 380 vs Zimbabwe at Perth 2003–04	Succeeded by Brian Lara
