= Saxelby (surname) =

Saxelby is a surname. Notable people with the surname include:

- Ian Saxelby (born 1989), English cricketer, nephew of Mark and Kevin
- Kevin Saxelby (born 1959), English cricketer
- Mark Saxelby (1969–2000), English cricketer

== See also ==
- Saxelbye, village in Leicestershire
