= Michael Vaughan =

English cricketer

Michael Vaughan OBE
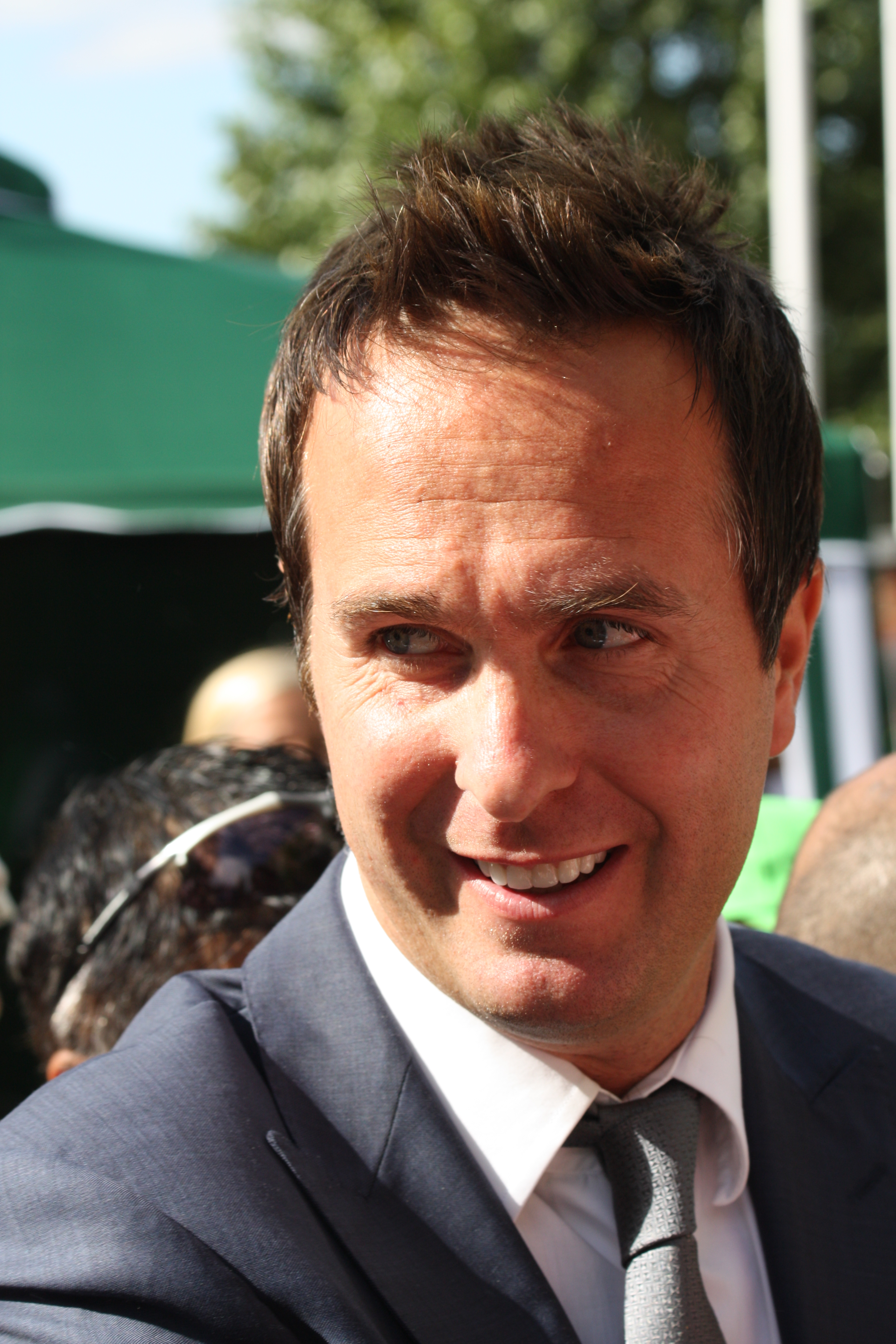
- Vaughan in 2010

Personal information
- Full name: Michael Paul Vaughan
- Born: 29 October 1974 (age 52); Eccles, Greater Manchester, England
- Nickname: Frankie, Virgil
- Height: 6 ft 2 in (1.88 m)
- Batting: Right-handed
- Bowling: Right-arm off-break
- Role: Batsman
- Relatives: Archie Vaughan (son)

International information
- National side: England (1999–2008)
- Test debut (cap 600): 25 November 1999 v South Africa
- Last Test: 30 July 2008 v South Africa
- ODI debut (cap 161): 23 March 2001 v Sri Lanka
- Last ODI: 21 April 2007 v West Indies
- ODI shirt no.: 99
- T20I debut (cap 11): 13 June 2005 v Australia
- Last T20I: 9 January 2007 v Australia
- T20I shirt no.: 99

Domestic team information
- Years: Team
- 1993–2009: Yorkshire (squad no. 7)

Career statistics
Competition	Tests	ODI	FC	LA
Matches	82	86	268	282
Runs scored	5,719	1,982	16,295	7,238
Batting average	41.44	27.15	36.95	29.18
100s/50s	18/18	0/16	42/68	3/46
Top score	197	90*	197	125*
Balls bowled	978	796	9,342	3,381
Wickets	6	16	114	78
Bowling average	93.50	40.56	46.00	33.38
5 wickets in innings	0	0	0	0
10 wickets in match	0	0	0	0
Best bowling	2/71	4/22	4/39	4/22
Catches/stumpings	44/–	25/–	118/–	88/–
Medal record
Men's Cricket
Representing England
Champions Trophy
Runner-up	2004 England
- Source: ESPNcricinfo, 18 September 2017

Michael Paul Vaughan OBE (born 29 October 1974) is an English cricket commentator and former cricketer who played all forms of the game. He served as England captain for the test team from 2003 to 2008, the one-day international team from 2003 to 2007, and was the first Twenty20 England captain from 2005 to 2007. He represented Yorkshire in the domestic arena.

Vaughan was a right-handed opening batter, who forged a successful England partnership with Marcus Trescothick, though he often batted in the middle order for England. He was ranked one of the best batters in the world following the 2002/03 Ashes, in which he scored 633 runs, including three centuries.

Vaughan captained England in 51 Tests, winning 26 (a then-national record) and losing 11; England won all seven home Tests of the 2004 summer under Vaughan, and the pinnacle of his captaincy career came with a 2–1 victory in the 2005 Ashes, England's first Ashes victory in 18 years (since 1986/87). However, a recurring knee injury, his decision to move down the batting order to accommodate other opening batsmen (Andrew Strauss and Alastair Cook) and the pressures of captaincy took their toll on Vaughan's batting during the latter part of his career: in Tests, he averaged 50.95 when not captain, and 36.02 as captain. Vaughan announced his retirement from first-class cricket on 30 June 2009.

== Early life ==
Michael Paul Vaughan was born in Eccles, Greater Manchester the younger son of Graham and Dee Vaughan, and a great-great-nephew of the early 20th century Lancashire and England cricketers Ernest and Johnny Tyldesley.

The family moved to Sheffield, when he was nine. His father, an engineer, had captained the Worsley third XI, and Vaughan says "My first memory of cricket is when I was 10 years old, hitting balls on the boundary while my dad was playing for Worsley in the Manchester Association League." However, it was his brother David (currently working as an estate agent), older by two years, who got him into the game.

He attended Silverdale School, and was enthusiastic about football, later reflecting, "I'd have probably preferred to be a footballer if I could have been good enough. But my knees would never have lasted." Despite his many commitments, he has been a regular supporter of Sheffield Wednesday F.C.

As a youngster he played alongside future England international footballer and Manchester United captain Gary Neville, himself a talented youth cricketer, during the Bunbury Cricket Festival.

Vaughan started playing cricket for the school side and it was here he first caught the eye of Doug Padgett, the Yorkshire coach. He also started playing club cricket for Sheffield Collegiate Cricket Club at Abbeydale Park in Sheffield.

== Personal life ==
Vaughan married Nichola Shannon (a native of Northern Ireland) on 27 September 2003. The couple have three children.

In 2005 he moved from Dore in Sheffield to Baslow in Derbyshire.

In 2006, he bought a house valued at £1 million on a luxury golf course development in Barbados and another on Isla Margarita. In 2012, Vaughan carried the Olympic Torch through Hillingdon for the London Olympic Games on 24 July.

Vaughan is a second cousin of the actress Catherine Tyldesley, known for her role as Eva Price in the ITV soap opera Coronation Street.

Vaughan stated he would be voting Conservative in 2015 and expressed dissatisfaction about the way in which the Labour Party acted after the 2017 general election.

In December 2025, Vaughan was in a restaurant near Bondi Beach in Sydney during the 2025 Bondi Beach shooting and sheltered inside with his family.

== County career ==
Vaughan, then living in Derbyshire, turned up as a child to watch Yorkshire playing at Sheffield. During the tea break, he was playing on the outfield with his friends when (then) Yorkshire head coach Doug Padgett spotted him, and approached him about joining the county.

However, Vaughan was born in Eccles, Greater Manchester, and at the time Yorkshire had a strict policy of only picking players who were born in Yorkshire. Years later, when the rule was removed, Doug Padgett re-investigated the young player, and offered him a place at the Yorkshire academy.

== International career ==
=== 1993–2003 ===
I have just seen my replacement at the top of the order, Michael Vaughan, score a Test century at Lords's, something I never managed to do. He is a Mancunian and a solid citizen – head still, feet moving forward and back according to length, a high elbow the fulcrum of his play, orthodox and stylish, a seamless transition. No, I don't think I shall be missed at all.

— Michael Atherton, then recently retired, commenting on Vaughan in his 2003 autobiography, Opening Up.

A batsman and occasional off spinner, Vaughan began playing professional cricket aged 17, and captained the England Under-19 cricket team on tour against Sri Lanka in 1993/94 and at home against India in 1994. He made his Test debut for England in South Africa in November 1999, becoming the 600th player to represent his country at Test cricket. He came to the crease for his first Test innings with England in the perilous state of two wickets down for two runs; within an over this had become four wickets down for two runs. He made a composed 33, and shared a partnership of 56 with Andrew Flintoff.

In May 2001 he scored his first Test century against Pakistan at Old Trafford. In December 2001, in Bangalore, Vaughan became the second Englishman, after Graham Gooch, and the 7th and most recent player in Test match history, to be given out handled the ball in Tests: on 64, he brushed away a ball from Sarandeep Singh, and was given out on appeal.

In 2002, Vaughan scored 900 runs in seven Tests against Sri Lanka and India. This included 115 against Sri Lanka at Lord's during the first Test. During the series against India he scored a duck and 100 during the first Test at Lord's, and his highest innings score to date of 197 against India during the second Test at Trent Bridge, Nottingham where he also took 3 wickets including the prized scalp of Sachin Tendulkar and during the fourth Test he scored 195 against India, again falling just short of a double-century. Later that year the English cricket team travelled to Australia for the 2002–03 Ashes series. It was here that Vaughan's career seemed to launch.

He started poorly in the first Test at Brisbane with scores of 33 and 0, but in the second Test in Adelaide he would improve on this with 177 and 41. During the fourth Test at Melbourne he made an aggressive 145. In the fifth and final Test at Sydney, Vaughan scored a match-winning 183 before being given out (wrongfully) lbw to Andy Bichel, as replays showed that not only was the ball missing leg stump but it was going over the stumps by a fair margin.

He became the first visiting batsman for 32 years to score over 600 runs in a Test match series in Australia and the first Englishman to make 3 Test hundreds in a series against Australia since Chris Broad. In total, he scored 1,481 Test runs in 2002, at the time the second highest for a calendar year in Test history after Viv Richards's 1,710 in 1976, although as of 2010 Vaughan's total has been exceeded another five times. This run of form made Vaughan the number one batsman in the world according to the ICC rankings, the first Englishman to achieve this since Graham Gooch.

Vaughan followed with a 156 against South Africa at Edgbaston in 2003. He was appointed Test captain in the next match, after Nasser Hussain stepped down. At the point at which he took over the England captaincy, Vaughan had a Test batting average of 50.98.

=== England captaincy ===
Vaughan's limited-overs batting rarely lived up to his success in Tests: indeed, despite a total of 86 matches played, he never made a One Day International century. His highest ODI score is 90 not out, which he made off 99 balls against Zimbabwe.

Despite this, on 6 May 2003, Vaughan was appointed captain of the England One Day International team, Nasser Hussain choosing to step down after the 2003 World Cup.

In July, he also took over from Hussain the captaincy of the Test side. He suddenly became captain of the England Test team on 28 July 2003, after scoring 156 in the first Test against South Africa, when Nasser Hussain resigned after England had drawn the game. The England team lost his first Test in charge by an innings and 92 runs, but went on to level the series in the next game. The series ended in a 2–2 draw.

Vaughan's batting initially suffered under the increased pressures of captaincy; in his first twelve matches as captain, his batting average was only 30.31. However, under Vaughan's captaincy, the England side became one of the most successful sides in world cricket. He benefited from the revolution begun by coach Duncan Fletcher and former captain Nasser Hussain, such as the awarding of central contracts to the core England players, and continued to forge a winning team.

In 2003, after the drawn series against South Africa, England toured the Indian subcontinent, beating Bangladesh but losing to Sri Lanka. In 2004, England were unbeaten, winning eleven matches and drawing two, including an England record of eight consecutive victories. They beat the West Indies away for the first time since 1968. They then won all seven home Tests against New Zealand and the West Indies, before beating South Africa away for the first time since 1965. In the 2005 home season, England easily beat Bangladesh in a two-Test series, before facing Australia for the Ashes.

Following a series defeat to South Africa, Vaughan stepped down as England captain on 3 August 2008 before the final Test at the Oval. In a highly emotional speech, Vaughan thanked those closest to him for their support and, amidst a flood of tears, asked if anyone present had a tissue.

=== Ashes 2005 ===
Hopes were high for the Ashes after the success of the previous eighteen months, but expectations were moderated by the knowledge that Australia had been the best team in the world for many years. Australian captain Ricky Ponting called for a catching pact, where batsmen would accept the word of fielders as to whether they were caught, but this was rejected by Vaughan who preferred to leave it to the umpires.

The build-up was long and intense, with press speculation over the ability of many players, leading Vaughan to say: "Both sets of players are sick and tired of talking about the Ashes. We've got a young group of players who are excited by the challenge, and it's a challenge we are all looking forward to."

In the first Test, at Lord's, England were easily beaten; Vaughan performed very poorly scoring only 3 and 4. Analysis of Vaughan's batting showed that over the last 30 months he had averaged only 37.77, and lacked consistency with a poor defensive technique. Despite his lack of form, he turned down the opportunity of playing county cricket for Yorkshire against Derbyshire, preferring to work in the nets with Duncan Fletcher. He returned, however, for their match against Kent, making 116 not out, and taking 2/42. He captained England to a narrow two-run victory in the second Test to level the series, but again scored poorly with only 24 and 1.

By the third Test, Vaughan's poor run of form was attracting increasing criticism. But during the third Test at Old Trafford he answered the critics, albeit with a bit of luck during a Glenn McGrath over. In the second ball of the over, when Vaughan was on 41, he cut hard at a wide delivery from McGrath and Gilchrist allowed it to slip through his gloves and run away for four runs. The very next ball McGrath clean bowled Vaughan with a superb off cutter, but this was in vain as the umpire called a no-ball for overstepping the line. Vaughan went on to strike 166, punishing in particular the lacklustre bowling of Jason Gillespie. Vaughan was eventually caught by Glenn McGrath off a full-toss delivery from occasional slow left-armer Simon Katich.

However, his opposing captain, Ponting, was equal to the task and made 156 as Australia clung on for the draw. Vaughan made 58 in the first innings of the fourth Test, but was out for a duck in the second, as England struggled in reaching their target of 129, eventually reaching it with three wickets to spare.

In the fifth Test, he scored 11 and 45, as it ended in a draw, allowing England to claim the Ashes for the first time since Mike Gatting's side in the 1986–87 series in Australia.

The England team were widely lauded after winning the Ashes. Tens of thousands of people lined the route of their open-top bus parade through London, with around 25,000 gathering in Trafalgar Square, their final destination.

Vaughan was given the freedom of his home city of Sheffield in honour of his achievements. In the New Year Honours, Vaughan became an OBE for his successful captaincy; the rest of the side were appointed MBEs.

=== Injury troubles ===
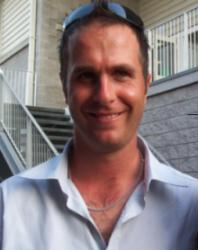
Vaughan at Bristol County Ground (2005)

A knee injury ruled Vaughan out of the first Test of England's tour of Pakistan in late 2005. He played in the next two, scoring a half-century in the third, as England lost the series 2–0. This broke England's unbeaten run of six consecutive Test series, which had taken them to second in the ICC Test Championship.

Vaughan missed almost the entire 2006 season due to injuries related to his knee; he was unable to play Test series against India and Sri Lanka. Although initially hopeful of a return, he was also unfit to play in the 2006/07 Ashes series in Australia, which England lost 5–0. On 9 January 2007, Vaughan made his first international appearance in over a year, captaining England to defeat in a Twenty20 match against Australia, despite scoring 27 off 21 balls. He captained England for the first two ODIs of 2006–07 Commonwealth Bank Series, a defeat to Australia and a victory over New Zealand, before a torn hamstring forced him to miss the next five games. He returned on 6 February 2007, leading England into the finals with a 14-run victory over New Zealand, although Vaughan was out for a golden duck. Two days later, he was forced to miss the best-of-three finals and return to England, after aggravating the same hamstring injury.

In October, Vaughan signed a rolling contract with Yorkshire intended to keep him at the club for the remainder of his career; the deal would only take effect after his central contract with England ended.

=== World Cup 2007 ===
Despite injury concerns, on 14 February 2007, Vaughan was selected in the final 15 for the 2007 Cricket World Cup in the Caribbean, and confirmed as captain. He captained the team through Group C with victories over Canada and Kenya and a defeat to New Zealand, scoring 45, 1 and 26.

During the Super Eight stage of the tournament, Vaughan produced a series of poor innings as England continued to underperform; they were knocked out with one match remaining having never looked convincing. After their penultimate match, in which they were soundly beaten by South Africa, Vaughan said "It's a very sad day for English cricket. It's a horrible feeling to walk off and be booed by a lot of English supporters, and rightfully so from the performance we put in. I fully expected us to turn up and produce something, but we didn't and we have to accept all the criticism that comes our way." In the Guardian, Mike Selvey said Vaughan's "selection without proof of form or fitness was a gamble and it has failed." Former England cricketer Bob Willis called for Vaughan to be axed as captain.

In England's final game against the West Indies, Vaughan was the pick of the bowlers with figures of 3/39 from 10 overs, and scored a quick-fire 79 off 68 as England achieved a narrow victory with just one wicket and one ball remaining.

=== 2007 season ===
After being released for county action on his return, Vaughan found form with 72 for Yorkshire against Hampshire at the Rose Bowl. However, in the second innings of that match he was again injured; this time with a broken finger, received as he tried to evade a Stuart Clark delivery. This ruled him out of the first Test against the West Indies on 17 May.

He recovered for the second test, his first for 18 months, and scored 103 in an emphatic victory of an innings and 283 runs; in The Guardian, Selvey described the innings as a "masterpiece", and said "Vaughan came as close to perfection as ever he can have done."

When England defeated the West Indies in the third Test at Old Trafford, Vaughan surpassed Peter May as the man who had led England to most Test victories, with 21 wins.

Despite this, at the end of the 4th day of the fourth test, it was announced that Vaughan would be standing down as captain of the one-day team with immediate effect.

On 30 July, against India Vaughan hit his 5,000th Test cricket run at Trent Bridge, and eventually fell to an unlucky dismissal off the thigh pad for 124. On 15 September, Vaughan top-scored for Yorkshire Phoenix with 95 runs against Derbyshire Phantoms (his highest one-day score in two years), thus firing them to victory in the county's last Pro40 match of the season.

For his performances in 2007, he was named in the World Test XI by ICC.

=== Sri Lanka and New Zealand ===
Vaughan failed to make a significant score in Sri Lanka as he opened for England with Cook. He travelled to New Zealand with great optimism. However, in the 3 match Test series, he again failed to make an impact, scoring a gritty 63 in the first Test defeat and averaging 20.05. Nevertheless, he did lead England to a first away series win in 3 years. There were many calls for Vaughan's place in the side to be reassessed, nothing in Vaughan's 135 from six domestic innings in 2008 to quieten them. He acknowledged his need for runs, but remained upbeat about his own position and about England's chances in the 2009 Ashes series.

Jonathan Agnew opined that Vaughan could ill afford another poor series. He answered his critics in the first test, however, scoring his eighteenth century when he hit 106 from 214 deliveries. This was his first century against New Zealand, and his sixth at Lord's, the latter equalling the record set by Graham Gooch.

=== South Africa ===
Following his century in the first Test of the summer against New Zealand, Vaughan again struggled with form in the second series of the summer against South Africa, scoring just 2, 0 and 21 in the first two Test matches of the series. With the team also performing poorly and with questions being raised over selection issues, Vaughan again came under pressure going into the third Test at Edgbaston. He scored a golden duck as the team capitulated to 231 all out on the first day of the test. This led to much criticism from the media, particularly Geoffrey Boycott, who stated on Test Match Special, "On his performances he doesn't deserve to play ... Vaughan, I've said for a long time, is not playing well ... There's something wrong – I don't know whether it's his eyesight or what". After defeat at Edgbaston, which meant that England would lose the series, Vaughan stepped down as England captain after five years in charge due to the team's recent lack of wins.

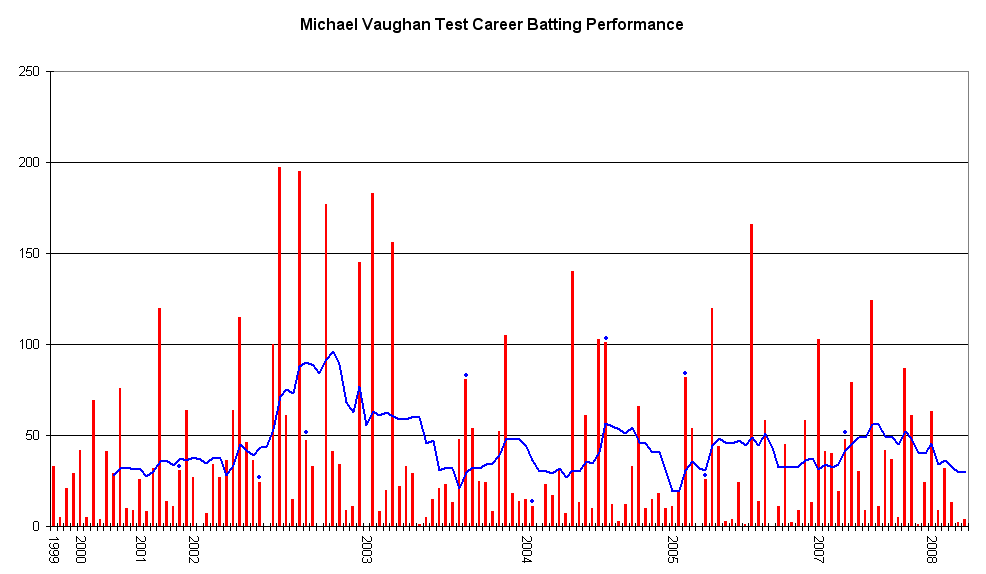
An innings-by-innings breakdown of Vaughan's Test match batting career, showing runs scored (red bars) and the average of the last ten innings (blue line).

=== Retirement ===
Vaughan continued his poor form through 2009 and could not earn himself a recall to the national team in time for the West Indies tour.

In January, Vaughan had withdrawn from the IPL auction to concentrate on getting back into the Test side in time for the Ashes, but to no avail: his poor form seemed to have brought an end to his international career as he was not included in the training party for the Ashes Tests. Mike Atherton, also a former England captain and now cricket correspondent for The Times, suggested that, based on the vibes emanating from Yorkshire County Cricket Club, Vaughan was not about to quit. Vaughan's future was not necessarily in his own hands. In seven County Championship matches in 2009, he had scored just 147 runs at an average of 21.00, by some way the lowest of Yorkshire's top-order batsmen. His last innings of 47 versus Worcestershire was his highest for Yorkshire since June 2008, and he had not hit a century since May 2002. In all, since the 2005 Ashes, he had rolled up a mere 747 Yorkshire runs at 25.75. "Does he still justify a place in Yorkshire's Championship side?" asked the Yorkshire Evening Post. A few days later, on 30 June 2009, Vaughan ended all speculation by announcing his retirement from all cricket with immediate effect. The announcement, made at Edgbaston, home to Warwickshire County Cricket Club, was made after his being omitted from the England Ashes squad. He gave a tongue-in-cheek explanation for his retirement, stating: "Two weeks ago my little lad, Archie, bowled a ball that hit a weed and knocked my off-stump out of the ground. If a three-year-old is bowling me out, it's time to move over!"

Not only is Vaughan involved in broadcasting he also has a large range of business interests outside cricket. Some of these involve Fitness with a gym called FITISM based in both Bakewell and now Wilmslow. Vaughan also has an art company called Art Balling where he paints pictures by hitting cricket balls at a wall.

Since his retirement, Vaughan has at various times been a brand ambassador for a range of companies. Most recently, he has been associated with menswear company Charles Tyrwhitt.

== Allegations of racism ==
Following an investigation into racism at Yorkshire County Cricket Club, on 4 November 2021 Vaughan announced he had been named in a report dealing with claims of institutionalised racism at the club by former player Azeem Rafiq. He confirmed that his name appears in the report into Rafiq's account of racial discrimination, harassment and bullying during his time at Yorkshire in his column in the Daily Telegraph. He denied the claim. On 5 November, the BBC announced that Vaughan would not present his Radio 5 Live show the following week, due to the investigation, but were still in discussions with his team over his future with the corporation. In March 2023, Vaughan was cleared on the balance of probabilities of making racist remarks towards Rafiq.

== Broadcasting ==
In 2009 Vaughan joined Test Match Special as an expert summariser during the England vs Australia ODI series. His first Test match was during England's series in South Africa.

He appeared on the Sport Panel Show "Fighting Talk" on BBC Radio 5 Live. Vaughan was also a commentator on Channel Five's Cricket on 5 television highlights package from the 2010 season. He also took part in the 2011 TV series Jamie's Dream School. Since 2012 Vaughan has also worked as an interviewer for BBC's golf coverage. In 2012, Depression in Cricket, on BBC Radio 5 live presented by Vaughan won the Sports Journalists' Association's Award for Best Radio Programme. The programme, broadcast in June 2011, featured interviews with Marcus Trescothick, Matthew Hoggard and Kevin Saxelby, whose brother, Mark, committed suicide in 2000.

On 21 June 2012, Vaughan was the first celebrity to be revealed in the line up of the tenth series of Strictly Come Dancing, and was voted off the show on 2 December 2012. During the 2017–18 Ashes Series he was an expert commentator on the BT Sport's coverage and an occasional host of The Cricket Show with Australian Michael Slater and then he was guest commentator on the Network Ten's coverage of 2017–18 Big Bash League season.

In January 2018, Vaughan participated in And They're Off! in aid of Sport Relief.

In 2018, Vaughan joined Fox Sports Australia as an expert commentator for the Australian test summer.

== Awards ==
Vaughan was chosen as one of the Wisden Cricketers of the Year in 2003 and became the first cricketer ever to be featured on the cover of cricket's Bible Wisden (in the same year) after his excellent batting in 2002. In August 2005, the Sheffield Hallam University honoured him with an honorary doctorate for his services towards the game. September 2005 saw him being awarded the Freedom of the City of Sheffield after captaining England to victory in the Ashes.

In December 2005, the England cricket team was awarded the BBC Sports Personality of the Year Team Award. Vaughan was nominated for the Sports Personality of the Year individual award, but that went to his teammate, Andrew Flintoff.

On 31 December 2005, the entire Ashes-winning England cricket team was awarded the Queen's New Years' Honours, with Vaughan, team coach Duncan Fletcher and manager Phil Neale being honoured with OBEs and the rest of the side being awarded MBEs.

Vaughan was also nominated in the Captain of the Year category for the 2006 ICC Awards (eventually awarded to Sri Lanka's Mahela Jayawardene) which was held in Mumbai on 3 November 2006. The following year, Vaughan was named in the Test Team of the Year at the 2007 ICC Awards.

== Writing ==
Vaughan has written three books related to his cricketing career: A Year in the Sun: The Captain's Story, Calling The Shots and Time To Declare.

Vaughan's first book was titled A Year in the Sun: The Captain's Story. In this book, he describes his phenomenal and fortuitous year of 2002–03, experiencing Bradmanesque-form, plundering seven centuries in 12 Tests, en route to become the world's best Test batsman that year. He also describes his experiences as an England cricketer, bowling out Sachin Tendulkar (one of the finest players in the modern game) and the controversial World Cup in Zimbabwe, which led to England forfeiting important points and eventually any chance they had of winning. Vaughan's appointment as England captain after the 2003 World Cup brought a new fresh spirit and life in the England dressing room, leading to instant success in the one-day arena. Nasser Hussain resigned as England Test captain shortly after – and Vaughan took charge in Tests as well.

In October 2005, Vaughan released Calling The Shots, which describes man-management of the team as captain and his time as the England cricket captain so far. It also describes his fractious relationship with the South African captain Graeme Smith. Vaughan alleged that Smith had called him [Vaughan] a "queer" and Andrew Flintoff a "big baby". Moreover, Smith acted as a witness during the trial of Vaughan's case with match-referee Clive Lloyd, where Vaughan had mildly rebuked the umpires for having called off play in bright conditions the previous day during a Test match in Johannesburg, South Africa, which resulted in Vaughan being fined his entire match-fee. Afterwards he started referring to Smith as 'The Witness'.

Vaughan released his book Time To Declare after announcing his retirement from all forms of cricket in 2009. This book talks about his early days as a Yorkshire cricketer, to emerging as a world-class batsman, forging a successful partnership with then coach Duncan Fletcher that finally culminated in England winning the Ashes in 2005, to becoming the most successful England cricket captain in history, and finally, recurring injuries which ultimately caused him to end his playing career.

He gives an insight about captaining and working with different personalities such as Flintoff, Kevin Pietersen and Steve Harmison, all of whom were instrumental in England winning the 2005 Ashes. He also gives his views on the state of cricket today and a frank assessment of fellow players, coaches and administrators. The book concludes with praise for the achievements of the 2009 Ashes-winning England team.

== International centuries ==
=== Test centuries ===
Test centuries of Michael Vaughan
No	Runs	Match	Against	City/Country	Venue	Start date	Result
[1]	120	11	Pakistan	Manchester, England	Old Trafford Cricket Ground	31 May 2001	Lost
[2]	115	17	Sri Lanka	London, England	Lord's	16 May 2002	Drawn
[3]	100	20	India	London, England	Lord's	25 July 2002	Won
[4]	197	21	India	Nottingham, England	Trent Bridge	8 August 2002	Drawn
[5]	195	23	India	London, England	The Oval	5 September 2002	Drawn
[6]	177	25	Australia	Adelaide, Australia	Adelaide Oval	21 November 2002	Lost
[7]	145	27	Australia	Melbourne, Australia	Melbourne Cricket Ground	26 December 2002	Lost
[8]	183	28	Australia	Sydney, Australia	Sydney Cricket Ground	2 January 2003	Won
[9]	156	31	South Africa	Birmingham, England	Edgbaston Cricket Ground	24 July 2003	Drawn
[10]	105	39	Sri Lanka	Kandy, Sri Lanka	Asgiriya Stadium	10 December 2003	Drawn
[11]	140	44	West Indies	(Antigua and Barbuda) St. John's, Antigua	Antigua Recreation Ground	10 April 2004	Drawn
[12]	103	47	West Indies	London, England	Lord's	22 July 2004	Won
[13]	101*	47	West Indies	London, England	Lord's	22 July 2004	Won
[14]	120	56	Bangladesh	London, England	Lord's	26 May 2005	Won
[15]	166	60	Australia	Manchester, England	Old Trafford Cricket Ground	11 August 2005	Drawn
[16]	103	65	West Indies	Leeds, England	Headingley Cricket Ground	25 May 2007	Won
[17]	124	69	India	Nottingham, England	Trent Bridge	27 July 2007	Lost
[18]	106	77	New Zealand	London, England	Lord's	15 May 2008	Drawn

Career performance:

		Batting				Bowling			
Opposition	Matches	Runs	Average	High Score	100 / 50	Runs	Wickets	Average	Best (Inns)
Australia	10	959	47.95	183	4 / 1	21	0	–	–
Bangladesh	4	372	74.40	120	1 / 2	–	–	–	–
India	9	1016	72.57	197	4 / 3	138	4	34.50	2/71
New Zealand	9	444	27.75	106	1 / 2	23	0	–	–
Pakistan	4	248	35.42	120	1 / 1	33	0	–	–
South Africa	14	768	30.72	156	1 / 3	165	2	82.50	1/26
Sri Lanka	10	755	41.94	115	2 / 4	77	0	–	–
West Indies	13	847	42.35	140	4 / 2	104	0	–	–
Zimbabwe	2	28	14.00	20	0 / 0	–	–	–	–
Overall	77	5585	42.96	197	18 / 18	561	6	93.50	2/71

Sporting positions
Preceded by Nasser Hussain	English national cricket captain 2003–2008 (Andrew Flintoff and Andrew Strauss deputised 2006–7)	Succeeded by Kevin Pietersen
