= 2012 Champions League Twenty20 squads =

This is a list of the squads that qualified for the 2012 Champions League Twenty20.

== Auckland Aces ==
Coach: (Zimbabwe) Paul Strang

No.	Player	Nat	Date of birth	Batting	Bowling style
48	Gareth Hopkins (c & wk)	(New Zealand)	24 November 1976 (aged 35)	Right	—
9	Andre Adams	(New Zealand)	17 July 1975 (aged 37)	Right	Right-arm fast-medium
1	Michael Bates	(New Zealand)	11 October 1983 (aged 28)	Right	Left-arm medium-fast
—	Bradley Cachopa	(New Zealand)	8 August 1988 (aged 24)	Right	—
22	Colin de Grandhomme	(New Zealand)	22 July 1986 (aged 26)	Right	Right-arm fast-medium
31	Martin Guptill	(New Zealand)	30 September 1986 (aged 26)	Right	Right-arm off break
16	Ronnie Hira	(New Zealand)	23 January 1987 (aged 25)	Left	Left-arm slow
6	Anaru Kitchen	(New Zealand)	21 February 1984 (aged 28)	Right	Slow left arm orthodox
—	Mitchell McClenaghan	(New Zealand)	11 June 1986 (aged 26)	Left	Left-arm medium-fast
—	Azhar Mahmood	(Pakistan)	28 February 1975 (aged 37)	Right	Right-arm fast-medium
—	Bruce Martin	(New Zealand)	25 April 1980 (aged 32)	Right	Slow left arm orthodox
32	Chris Martin	(New Zealand)	10 December 1974 (aged 37)	Right	Right-arm fast-medium
37	Kyle Mills	(New Zealand)	15 March 1979 (aged 33)	Right	Right-arm fast-medium
18	Colin Munro	(New Zealand)	11 March 1987 (aged 25)	Left	Right-arm medium-fast
10	Lou Vincent	(New Zealand)	11 November 1978 (aged 33)	Right	Right-arm medium

== Chennai Super Kings ==
Coach: (New Zealand) Stephen Fleming

No.	Player	Nat	Date of birth	Batting	Bowling style
7	Mahendra Singh Dhoni (c & wk)	(India)	7 July 1981 (aged 31)	Right	Right-arm medium
3	Suresh Raina	(India)	27 November 1986 (aged 25)	Left	Right-arm off break
4	Doug Bollinger	(Australia)	24 July 1981 (aged 31)	Left	Left-arm fast-medium
6	Wriddhiman Saha	(India)	24 October 1984 (aged 27)	Right	—
8	Murali Vijay	(India)	1 April 1984 (aged 28)	Right	Right-arm off break
9	Yo Mahesh	(India)	21 December 1987 (aged 24)	Right	Right-arm medium-fast
12	Ravindra Jadeja	(India)	6 December 1988 (aged 23)	Left	Slow left arm orthodox
13	Francois du Plessis	(South Africa)	13 July 1984 (aged 28)	Right	Leg break
27	Shadab Jakati	(India)	27 November 1980 (aged 31)	Left	Slow left arm orthodox
28	Ben Hilfenhaus	(Australia)	15 March 1983 (aged 29)	Right	Right-arm fast-medium
33	Subramaniam Badrinath	(India)	30 August 1980 (aged 32)	Right	Right-arm off break
48	Michael Hussey	(Australia)	27 May 1975 (aged 37)	Left	Right-arm medium
81	Albie Morkel	(South Africa)	10 June 1981 (aged 31)	Left	Right-arm medium-fast
92	Nuwan Kulasekara	(Sri Lanka)	22 July 1982 (aged 30)	Right	Right-arm medium-fast
99	Ravichandran Ashwin	(India)	17 September 1986 (aged 26)	Right	Right-arm off break

== Delhi Daredevils ==
Ahead of the tournament, Mahela Jayawardene was named the captain after Virender Sehwag stepped down from the position. Sehwag had captained the team for four of the past five years.

Coach: (South Africa) Eric Simons

No.	Player	Nat	Date of birth	Batting	Bowling style
27	Mahela Jayawardene (c)	(Sri Lanka)	27 May 1977 (aged 35)	Right	Right-arm medium
**	Virender Sehwag	(India)	20 October 1978 (aged 33)	Right	Right-arm off break
3	Ross Taylor	(New Zealand)	8 March 1984 (aged 28)	Right	Right-arm off break
6	Unmukt Chand	(India)	26 March 1993 (aged 19)	Right	Right-arm off break
12	Andre Russell	(Jamaica)	29 April 1988 (aged 24)	Right	Right-arm fast
15	Pawan Negi	(India)	6 January 1993 (aged 19)	Left	Slow left arm orthodox
24	Kevin Pietersen	(England)	27 June 1980 (aged 32)	Right	Right-arm off break
31	David Warner	(Australia)	27 October 1986 (aged 25)	Left	Leg break
35	Naman Ojha (wk)	(India)	20 July 1983 (aged 29)	Right	—
36	Venugopal Rao	(India)	26 February 1982 (aged 30)	Right	Right-arm off break
55	Ajit Agarkar	(India)	4 December 1977 (aged 34)	Right	Right-arm fast-medium
56	Irfan Pathan	(India)	27 October 1984 (aged 27)	Left	Left-arm medium-fast
65	Morné Morkel	(South Africa)	6 October 1984 (aged 28)	Left	Right-arm fast
77	Aavishkar Salvi	(India)	20 October 1981 (aged 30)	Right	Right-arm medium-fast
87	Umesh Yadav	(India)	25 October 1987 (aged 24)	Right	Right-arm fast

== Hampshire Royals ==
Hampshire were able to include Shahid Afridi in their squad as he was registered with the team, despite him having not played any matches in the 2012 Friends Life t20 due to visa issues. From the domestic tournament, Hampshire were unable to have Neil McKenzie and Simon Katich due to them having qualified with other teams.

Coach: (England) Craig White

No.	Player	Nat	Date of birth	Batting	Bowling style
4	James Adams (c)	(England)	23 September 1980 (aged 32)	Left	Left-arm medium
0	Shahid Afridi	(Pakistan)	1 March 1980 (aged 32)	Right	Leg break googly
7	Sean Ervine	(Zimbabwe)	6 December 1982 (aged 29)	Left	Right-arm medium
8	Liam Dawson	(England)	1 March 1990 (aged 22)	Right	Slow left arm orthodox
14	James Vince	(England)	14 March 1991 (aged 21)	Right	Right-arm medium
15	Michael Carberry	(England)	29 September 1980 (aged 32)	Left	Right-arm off break
16	Michael Bates (wk)	(England)	10 October 1990 (aged 21)	Right	—
17	Dimitri Mascarenhas	(England)	30 October 1977 (aged 34)	Right	Right-arm fast-medium
18	David Griffiths	(England)	10 September 1985 (aged 27)	Left	Right-arm fast
19	Danny Briggs	(England)	30 April 1991 (aged 21)	Right	Slow left arm orthodox
25	Chris Wood	(England)	27 June 1990 (aged 22)	Right	Right-arm fast-medium
32	Glenn Maxwell	(Australia)	14 October 1988 (aged 23)	Right	Right-arm off break
33	Kabir Ali	(England)	24 November 1980 (aged 31)	Right	Right-arm medium-fast
38	Hamza Riazuddin	(England)	19 December 1989 (aged 22)	Right	Right-arm fast-medium
46	Bilal Shafayat	(England)	10 July 1984 (aged 28)	Right	Right-arm medium-fast

== Kolkata Knight Riders ==
Coach: (Australia) Trevor Bayliss

No.	Player	Nat	Date of birth	Batting	Bowling style
5	Gautam Gambhir (c)	(India)	14 October 1981 (aged 30)	Left	Leg break
3	Jacques Kallis	(South Africa)	16 October 1975 (aged 36)	Right	Right-arm fast-medium
6	Laxmi Ratan Shukla	(India)	6 May 1981 (aged 31)	Right	Right-arm medium
9	Manoj Tiwary	(India)	14 November 1985 (aged 26)	Right	Leg break googly
14	Mohammed Shami	(India)	9 March 1990 (aged 22)	Right	Right-arm medium
21	Iqbal Abdulla	(India)	2 December 1989 (aged 22)	Left	Slow left arm orthodox
22	Rajat Bhatia	(India)	22 October 1979 (aged 32)	Right	Right-arm medium-fast
27	Ryan ten Doeschate	(Netherlands)	30 June 1980 (aged 32)	Right	Right-arm medium-fast
28	Yusuf Pathan	(India)	17 November 1982 (aged 29)	Right	Right-arm off break
36	Manvinder Bisla	(India)	27 December 1984 (aged 27)	Right	—
42	Brendon McCullum (wk)	(New Zealand)	27 September 1981 (aged 31)	Right	Right-arm medium
55	Lakshmipathy Balaji	(India)	27 September 1981 (aged 31)	Right	Right-arm medium-fast
58	Brett Lee	(Australia)	8 November 1976 (aged 35)	Right	Right-arm fast
74	Sunil Narine	(Trinidad and Tobago)	26 May 1988 (aged 24)	Left	Right-arm off break
75	Shakib Al Hasan	(Bangladesh)	24 March 1987 (aged 25)	Left	Slow left arm orthodox

== Highveld Lions ==
Coach: (South Africa) Geoffrey Toyana

No.	Player	Nat	Date of birth	Batting	Bowling style
73	Alviro Petersen (c)	(South Africa)	25 November 1980 (aged 31)	Right	Right-arm off break
—	Temba Bavuma	(South Africa)	17 May 1990 (aged 22)	Right	Right-arm medium
—	Gulam Bodi	(South Africa)	4 January 1979 (aged 33)	Left	Slow left-arm wrist-spin
58	Zander de Bruyn	(South Africa)	5 July 1975 (aged 37)	Right	Right-arm fast-medium
—	Quinton de Kock	(South Africa)	17 December 1992 (aged 19)	Left	—
4	Neil McKenzie	(South Africa)	24 November 1975 (aged 36)	Right	Right-arm medium
—	Pumelela Matshikwe	(South Africa)	19 June 1984 (aged 28)	Right	Right-arm medium
—	Chris Morris	(South Africa)	30 April 1987 (aged 25)	Right	Right-arm fast-medium
—	Dirk Nannes	(Australia)	16 May 1976 (aged 36)	Right	Left-arm fast
54	Ethan O'Reilly	(South Africa)	27 December 1985 (aged 26)	Right	Right-arm fast
—	Dwaine Pretorius	(South Africa)	29 March 1989 (aged 23)	Right	Right-arm medium-fast
—	Sohail Tanvir	(Pakistan)	12 December 1984 (aged 27)	Left	Left-arm medium-fast, Slow left arm orthodox
86	Jean Symes	(South Africa)	13 November 1986 (aged 25)	Left	Slow left arm orthodox
10	Thami Tsolekile (wk)	(South Africa)	9 October 1980 (aged 32)	Right	Right-arm off break

== Mumbai Indians ==
Coach: (India) Robin Singh

No.	Player	Nat	Date of birth	Batting	Bowling style
3	Harbhajan Singh (c)	(India)	3 July 1980 (aged 32)	Right	Right-arm off break
1	Thisara Perera	(Sri Lanka)	3 April 1989 (aged 23)	Left	Right-arm medium-fast
9	Ambati Rayudu	(India)	23 September 1985 (aged 27)	Right	Right-arm off break
10	Sachin Tendulkar	(India)	24 April 1973 (aged 39)	Right	Right-arm off break, Leg break googly
13	Munaf Patel	(India)	12 July 1983 (aged 29)	Right	Right-arm medium-fast
16	Suryakumar Yadav	(India)	14 September 1990 (aged 22)	Right	Right-arm medium
19	Dinesh Karthik (wk)	(India)	1 June 1985 (aged 27)	Right	—
30	Dhawal Kulkarni	(India)	10 December 1988 (aged 23)	Right	Right-arm medium
30	Pragyan Ojha	(India)	5 September 1986 (aged 26)	Left	Slow left arm orthodox
45	Rohit Sharma	(India)	30 April 1987 (aged 25)	Right	Right-arm off break
50	Dwayne Smith	(Barbados)	12 April 1983 (aged 29)	Right	Right-arm medium
55	Kieron Pollard	(Trinidad and Tobago)	12 May 1987 (aged 25)	Right	Right-arm medium-fast
88	Richard Levi	(South Africa)	14 January 1988 (aged 24)	Right	Right-arm medium
99	Lasith Malinga	(Sri Lanka)	28 August 1983 (aged 29)	Right	Right-arm fast
25	Mitchell Johnson	(Australia)	2 November 1981 (aged 30)	Left	Left-arm fast

== Perth Scorchers ==
Coach: (Australia) Lachlan Stevens

No.	Player	Nat	Date of birth	Batting	Bowling style
26	Marcus North (c)	(Australia)	28 July 1979 (aged 33)	Left	Right-arm off break
12	Tom Beaton	(Australia)	28 November 1990 (aged 21)	Right	Right-arm medium
19	Michael Beer	(Australia)	9 June 1984 (aged 28)	Right	Slow left arm orthodox
5	Paul Collingwood	(England)	26 May 1976 (aged 36)	Right	Right-arm medium
13	Nathan Coulter-Nile	(Australia)	11 October 1987 (aged 24)	Right	Right-arm fast
41	Ryan Duffield	(Australia)	20 June 1988 (aged 24)	Left	Left-arm fast-medium
28	Ben Edmondson	(Australia)	28 September 1978 (aged 34)	Left	Right-arm fast-medium
74	Herschelle Gibbs	(South Africa)	23 February 1974 (aged 38)	Right	Right-arm bowler
31	Brad Hogg	(Australia)	6 February 1971 (aged 41)	Left	Slow left-arm wrist-spin
37	Simon Katich	(Australia)	21 August 1975 (aged 37)	Left	Slow left-arm wrist-spin
10	Mitchell Marsh	(Australia)	20 October 1991 (aged 20)	Right	Right-arm medium
15	Joe Mennie	(Australia)	24 December 1988 (aged 23)	Right	Right-arm fast-medium
20	Shaun Marsh	(Australia)	9 July 1983 (aged 29)	Left	Slow left arm orthodox
11	Nathan Rimmington	(Australia)	11 November 1982 (aged 29)	Right	Right-arm fast-medium
34	Luke Ronchi (wk)	(Australia)	23 April 1981 (aged 31)	Right	—

== Sialkot Stallions ==
Coach: (Pakistan) Naved Anjum

No.	Player	Nat	Date of birth	Batting	Bowling style
—	Shoaib Malik (c)	(Pakistan)	1 February 1982 (aged 30)	Right	Right-arm off break
—	Qaiser Abbas	(Pakistan)	7 May 1982 (aged 30)	Left	Slow left arm orthodox
—	Sarfraz Ahmed	(Pakistan)	11 December 1978 (aged 33)	Left	Left-arm fast-medium
—	Shakeel Ansar (wk)	(Pakistan)	11 November 1978 (aged 33)	Right	—
—	Mohammad Ayub	(Pakistan)	13 September 1979 (aged 33)	Right	Right-arm off break
—	Umaid Asif	(Pakistan)	30 April 1984 (aged 28)	Right	Right-arm medium-fast
—	Bilawal Bhatti	(Pakistan)	17 September 1991 (aged 21)	Right	Right-arm medium-fast
—	Raza Hasan	(Pakistan)	8 July 1992 (aged 20)	Right	Slow left arm orthodox
—	Ali Khan	(Pakistan)	1 August 1989 (aged 23)	Right	Right-arm medium-fast
—	Imran Nazir	(Pakistan)	16 December 1981 (aged 30)	Right	Leg break
—	Faisal Naved	(Pakistan)	2 March 1980 (aged 32)	Right	Right-arm medium
—	Naved-ul-Hasan	(Pakistan)	28 February 1978 (aged 34)	Right	Right-arm medium-fast
—	Haris Sohail	(Pakistan)	9 January 1989 (aged 23)	Left	Left-arm medium
—	Shahid Yousuf	(Pakistan)	15 June 1986 (aged 26)	Right	Right-arm medium-fast

== Sydney Sixers ==
Coach: (Australia) Corey Richards

No.	Player	Nat	Date of birth	Batting	Bowling style
24	Brad Haddin (c & wk)	(Australia)	23 October 1977 (aged 34)	Right	—
33	Shane Watson	(Australia)	17 June 1981 (aged 31)	Right	Right-arm fast-medium
27	Pat Cummins	(Australia)	8 May 1993 (aged 19)	Right	Right-arm fast
8	Josh Hazlewood	(Australia)	8 January 1991 (aged 21)	Left	Right-arm fast-medium
21	Moisés Henriques	(Australia)	1 February 1987 (aged 25)	Right	Right-arm fast-medium
45	Michael Lumb	(England)	12 February 1980 (aged 32)	Left	Right-arm medium
15	Nathan McCullum	(New Zealand)	1 September 1980 (aged 32)	Right	Right-arm off break
53	Nic Maddinson	(Australia)	21 December 1991 (aged 20)	Left	Slow left arm orthodox
—	Ian Moran	(Australia)	16 August 1979 (aged 33)	Right	Right-arm fast-medium
20	Peter Nevill	(Australia)	13 October 1985 (aged 26)	Right	—
72	Stephen O'Keefe	(Australia)	9 December 1984 (aged 27)	Right	Slow left arm orthodox
99	Ben Rohrer	(Australia)	26 March 1981 (aged 31)	Left	—
19	Steve Smith	(Australia)	2 June 1989 (aged 23)	Right	Leg break googly
56	Mitchell Starc	(Australia)	30 January 1990 (aged 22)	Left	Left-arm fast
7	Dominic Thornely	(Australia)	1 October 1978 (aged 34)	Right	Right-arm medium, Right-arm off break

== Titans ==
Coach: (England) Matthew Maynard

No.	Player	Nat	Date of birth	Batting	Bowling style
34	Martin van Jaarsveld (c)	(South Africa)	18 June 1974 (aged 38)	Right	Right-arm medium, Right-arm off break
24	Farhaan Behardien	(South Africa)	9 October 1983 (aged 29)	Right	Right-arm fast-medium
19	Henry Davids	(South Africa)	19 January 1980 (aged 32)	Right	Right-arm medium-fast
36	Marchant de Lange	(South Africa)	13 October 1990 (aged 21)	Right	Right-arm fast
17	AB de Villiers	(South Africa)	17 February 1984 (aged 28)	Right	Right-arm medium
22	Paul Harris	(South Africa)	2 November 1978 (aged 33)	Right	Slow left arm orthodox
20	Heino Kuhn (wk)	(South Africa)	1 April 1984 (aged 28)	Right	—
—	Eden Links	(South Africa)	25 March 1989 (aged 23)	Right	Right-arm off break
80	Ethy Mbhalati	(South Africa)	18 November 1981 (aged 30)	Right	Right-arm medium-fast
—	Mangaliso Mosehle	(South Africa)	24 April 1990 (aged 22)	Right	—
—	Rowan Richards	(South Africa)	8 July 1984 (aged 28)	Left	Left-arm fast-medium
1	Jacques Rudolph	(South Africa)	4 May 1981 (aged 31)	Left	Leg break googly
52	Roelof van der Merwe	(South Africa)	31 December 1984 (aged 27)	Right	Slow left arm orthodox
8	Alfonso Thomas	(South Africa)	9 February 1977 (aged 35)	Right	Right-arm fast-medium
96	David Wiese	(South Africa)	18 May 1985 (aged 27)	Right	Right-arm medium-fast

== Trinidad and Tobago ==
Trinidad and Tobago are without Kieron Pollard, Dwayne Bravo and Sunil Narine, who all elected to play for Indian teams.

Coach: (Trinidad and Tobago) David Williams

No.	Player	Nat	Date of birth	Batting	Bowling style
80	Denesh Ramdin (c & wk)	(Trinidad and Tobago)	13 March 1985 (aged 27)	Right	—
7	Samuel Badree	(Trinidad and Tobago)	9 March 1981 (aged 31)	Right	Leg break
15	Adrian Barath	(Trinidad and Tobago)	14 April 1990 (aged 22)	Right	Right-arm off break
46	Darren Bravo	(Trinidad and Tobago)	6 February 1989 (aged 23)	Left	Right-arm medium-fast
20	Kevon Cooper	(Trinidad and Tobago)	2 February 1989 (aged 23)	Right	Right-arm medium
51	Rayad Emrit	(Trinidad and Tobago)	8 March 1981 (aged 31)	Right	Right-arm medium-fast
—	Shannon Gabriel	(Trinidad and Tobago)	28 April 1988 (aged 24)	Right	Right-arm fast-medium
1	Sherwin Ganga	(Trinidad and Tobago)	13 February 1982 (aged 30)	Left	Right-arm off break
3	Jason Mohammed	(Trinidad and Tobago)	23 September 1986 (aged 26)	Right	Right-arm off break
—	Evin Lewis	(Trinidad and Tobago)	27 December 1991 (aged 20)	Left	—
—	Yannick Ottley	(Trinidad and Tobago)	7 September 1991 (aged 21)	Right	Slow left arm orthodox
40	William Perkins	(Trinidad and Tobago)	8 October 1986 (aged 26)	Right	—
14	Ravi Rampaul	(Trinidad and Tobago)	15 October 1984 (aged 27)	Left	Right-arm fast-medium
54	Lendl Simmons	(Trinidad and Tobago)	25 January 1985 (aged 27)	Right	Right-arm medium-fast
—	Navin Stewart	(Trinidad and Tobago)	13 June 1983 (aged 29)	Right	Right-arm fast-medium

== Uva Next ==
Coach: (South Africa) Dave Nosworthy

No.	Player	Nat	Date of birth	Batting	Bowling style
25	Thilina Kandamby (c)	(Sri Lanka)	4 June 1982 (aged 30)	Left	Leg break
—	Fawad Alam	(Pakistan)	8 October 1985 (aged 27)	Left	Slow left arm orthodox
6	Shivnarine Chanderpaul	(Guyana)	16 August 1974 (aged 38)	Left	Leg break
26	Dilhara Fernando	(Sri Lanka)	19 July 1979 (aged 33)	Right	Right-arm fast-medium
55	Umar Gul	(Pakistan)	14 April 1984 (aged 28)	Right	Right-arm fast-medium
89	Charith Jayampathi	(Sri Lanka)	1 February 1991 (aged 21)	Left	Left-arm medium-fast
—	Chinthaka Jayasinghe	(Sri Lanka)	19 May 1978 (aged 34)	Right	Right-arm medium
34	Andrew McDonald	(Australia)	5 June 1981 (aged 31)	Right	Right-arm fast-medium
—	Dilshan Munaweera	(Sri Lanka)	24 April 1989 (aged 23)	Right	Right-arm off break
24	Jacob Oram	(New Zealand)	28 July 1978 (aged 34)	Left	Right-arm fast-medium
41	Seekkuge Prasanna	(Sri Lanka)	27 June 1985 (aged 27)	Right	Leg break
27	Bhanuka Rajapaksa	(Sri Lanka)	24 October 1991 (aged 20)	Left	Right-arm medium
15	Sameera de Zoysa	(Sri Lanka)	31 January 1987 (aged 25)	Left	—
18	Sachithra Senanayake	(Sri Lanka)	9 February 1985 (aged 27)	Right	Right-arm off break
44	Upul Tharanga (wk)	(Sri Lanka)	2 February 1985 (aged 27)	Left	—

== Yorkshire Carnegie ==
Yorkshire's overseas player David Miller may only be available for their first match due to commitments in South African domestic cricket. Yorkshire were unable to include Andrew Hodd due to him only being on loan from Sussex and having not played any Twenty20 matches for Yorkshire.

Coach: (Australia) Jason Gillespie

No.	Player	Nat	Date of birth	Batting	Bowling style
26	Andrew Gale (c)	(England)	28 November 1983 (aged 28)	Left	Leg break
2	Phil Jaques	(Australia)	3 May 1979 (aged 33)	Left	Left-arm medium
3	Adil Rashid	(England)	17 February 1988 (aged 24)	Right	Leg break
5	Joe Root	(England)	30 December 1990 (aged 21)	Right	Right-arm off break
7	Iain Wardlaw	(Scotland)	29 June 1985 (aged 27)	Right	Right-arm fast-medium
8	David Miller	(South Africa)	10 June 1989 (aged 23)	Left	Right-arm off break
9	Adam Lyth	(England)	25 September 1987 (aged 25)	Left	Right-arm medium-fast, Right-arm off break
11	Ryan Sidebottom	(England)	15 January 1978 (aged 34)	Left	Left-arm fast-medium
12	Oliver Hannon-Dalby	(England)	20 June 1989 (aged 23)	Left	Right-arm medium-fast
17	Steven Patterson	(England)	3 October 1983 (aged 29)	Right	Right-arm medium-fast
19	Gary Ballance	(England)	22 November 1989 (aged 22)	Left	Right-arm slow
21	Jonny Bairstow (wk)	(England)	26 September 1989 (aged 23)	Right	Right-arm bowler
23	Moin Ashraf	(England)	5 January 1992 (aged 20)	Right	Right-arm fast-medium
30	Azeem Rafiq	(England)	27 February 1991 (aged 21)	Right	Right-arm off break
—	Dan Hodgson	(England)	26 February 1990 (aged 22)	Right	—
