= 2012–13 Sydney Sixers season =

Sydney Sixers
2012–13 season
- Coach: Trevor Bayliss (2nd season)
- Captain(s): Brad Haddin (2nd season)
- Home ground: Sydney Cricket Ground, Sydney
- CLT20: Champions
- Big Bash League: 7th
- BBL Finals: DNQ

The 2012–13 Sydney Sixers season was the club's second consecutive season in the Big Bash League (BBL).

== Players ==
=== Squad ===
Players with international caps are listed in bold.

No.	Name	Nat	Birth date	Batting style	Bowling style	Notes
Batsmen
16	Daniel Hughes	(Australia)	2 July 1979 (age 47)	Left-handed	Right-arm fast medium	
45	**Michael Lumb**	(England)	12 February 1980 (age 46)	Left-handed	Right-arm medium	Overseas player
53	Nic Maddinson	(Australia)	21 December 1991 (age 34)	Left-handed	Slow Left-arm orthodox	
17	Kurtis Patterson	(Australia)	5 May 1993 (age 33)	Left-handed	Right-arm off break	New signing, announced 18 July 2012
31	**David Warner**	(Australia)	27 October 1986 (age 40)	Left-handed	Right-arm leg break	
All-rounders
21	**Moisés Henriques**	(Australia)	1 February 1987 (age 39)	Right-handed	Right-arm fast-medium	Re-signed, announced 18 July 2012
9	**Jeevan Mendis**	(Sri Lanka)	15 January 1983 (age 43)	Left-handed	Right-arm leg break	Overseas player
5	Ian Moran	(Australia)	16 August 1979 (age 47)	Right-handed	Right-arm fast Medium	
27	Dominic Thornely	(Australia)	1 October 1978 (age 48)	Right-handed	Right-arm medium & off spin	
72	**Stephen O'Keefe**	(Australia)	9 December 1984 (age 41)	Right-handed	Slow left-arm orthodox	Re-signed, announced 18 July 2012
49	**Steve Smith**	(Australia)	2 June 1989 (age 37)	Right-handed	Right-arm leg break	
Wicket-keepers
24	**Brad Haddin**	(Australia)	23 October 1977 (age 49)	Right-handed	–	Captain, Re-signed, announced 18 July 2012
13	Daniel Smith	(Australia)	17 March 1982 (age 44)	Right-handed	–	
Bowlers
22	Luke Feldman	(Australia)	1 August 1984 (age 42)	Right-handed	Right-arm fast medium	
8	**Josh Hazlewood**	(Australia)	8 January 1991 (age 35)	Left-handed	Right-arm fast-medium	Re-signed, announced 18 July 2012
2	Josh Lalor	(Australia)	2 November 1987 (age 39)	Left-handed	Left-arm fast	New signing, announced 18 July 2012
58	**Brett Lee**	(Australia)	8 November 1976 (age 50)	Right-handed	Right-arm fast	
56	**Mitchell Starc**	(Australia)	30 January 1990 (age 36)	Left-handed	Left-arm fast-medium	
74	**Sunil Narine**	(Trinidad and Tobago)	26 May 1988 (age 38)	Left-handed	Right-arm Off Spin	Overseas Player

Note: This table is for the 2012–13 Big Bash League season squad. See also 2012 Champions League Twenty20 squads#Sydney Sixers.

=== Transfers ===
In:

Nat	Name	Role	Previous team
(Trinidad and Tobago)	Sunil Narine	Bowler	New player
(Sri Lanka)	Jeevan Mendis	All-rounder	New player
(Australia)	Kurtis Patterson	Batsmen	New player
(Australia)	Daniel Hughes	Batsmen	New player
(Australia)	David Warner	Batsmen	Sydney Thunder
(Australia)	Daniel Smith	Wicket-keeper	Sydney Thunder
(Australia)	Josh Lalor	Bowler	Perth Scorchers
(Australia)	Luke Feldman	Bowler	Hobart Hurricanes

Out:

Nat	Name	Role	Going to
(Australia)	Stuart MacGill	Bowler	Retired
(Australia)	Pat Cummins	Bowler	Perth Scorchers
(Australia)	Peter Nevill	Wicket-keeper	Melbourne Renegades
(Australia)	Ben Rohrer	Batsmen	Melbourne Renegades
(Trinidad and Tobago)	Dwayne Bravo	All-rounder	Not re-signed
(New Zealand)	Nathan McCullum	All-rounder	Not re-signed
(Australia)	Ed Cowan	Batsmen	Hobart Hurricanes
(Australia)	Shane Watson	All-rounder	Brisbane Heat

Note: Transfers occurred after the Champions League Twenty20 tournament. Thus players listed as "Out" (excluding MacGill, Bravo and Cowan) competed in the CLT20 tournament and players listed as "In" did not. See also 2012 Champions League Twenty20 squads#Sydney Sixers.

== Champions League Twenty20 ==
As winners of the 2011–12 Big Bash League, the Sydney Sixers qualified for the 2012 Champions League Twenty20 series held in South Africa. Corey Richards was the caretaker coach of the Sixers for this tournament as Trevor Bayliss's Indian Premier League team, the Kolkata Knight Riders also qualified. The tournament would prove to be successful for the Sixers, winning the tournament in their first attempt.

=== Group stage ===
==== Ladder ====
Team	Pld	W	L	NR	Pts	NRR
(Australia) Sydney Sixers	4	4	0	0	16	+1.656
(South Africa) Highveld Lions	4	3	1	0	12	+0.140
(India) Chennai Super Kings	4	2	2	0	8	-0.049
(India) Mumbai Indians	4	0	3	1	2	-0.471
(England) Yorkshire Carnegie	4	0	3	1	2	-1.791

Source: Wisden

==== Matches ====
14 October	Sydney Sixers (Australia); 185/5 (20 overs)	v	(India) Chennai Super Kings; 171/9 (20 overs)	(Australia) Sydney Sixers won by 14 runs
13:30; Scorecard	Sydney Sixers (Australia); 185/5 (20 overs)	v	(India) Chennai Super Kings; 171/9 (20 overs)	New Wanderers Stadium, Johannesburg; Umpires: Asad Rauf (Pak) and Marais Erasmus (SA); Player of the match: Moises Henriques (Sydney Sixers)
13:30; Scorecard	Moises Henriques 49* (23); Ravichandran Ashwin 2/32 (4 overs)		Suresh Raina 57 (33); Moises Henriques 3/23 (3 overs)	New Wanderers Stadium, Johannesburg; Umpires: Asad Rauf (Pak) and Marais Erasmus (SA); Player of the match: Moises Henriques (Sydney Sixers)
Chennai Super Kings won the toss and elected to field				New Wanderers Stadium, Johannesburg; Umpires: Asad Rauf (Pak) and Marais Erasmus (SA); Player of the match: Moises Henriques (Sydney Sixers)

16 October	Yorkshire Carnegie (England); 96/9 (20 overs)	v	(Australia) Sydney Sixers; 98/2 (8.5 overs)	(Australia) Sydney Sixers won by 8 wickets
13:30; Scorecard	Yorkshire Carnegie (England); 96/9 (20 overs)	v	(Australia) Sydney Sixers; 98/2 (8.5 overs)	Newlands, Cape Town; Umpires: Aleem Dar (Pak) and Rod Tucker (Aus); Player of the match: Brad Haddin (Sydney Sixers)
13:30; Scorecard	Joe Root 25 (24); Mitchell Starc 3/22 (4 overs)		Michael Lumb 43* (24); Azeem Rafiq 1/21 (1.5 overs)	Newlands, Cape Town; Umpires: Aleem Dar (Pak) and Rod Tucker (Aus); Player of the match: Brad Haddin (Sydney Sixers)
Yorkshire Carnegie won the toss and elected to bat				Newlands, Cape Town; Umpires: Aleem Dar (Pak) and Rod Tucker (Aus); Player of the match: Brad Haddin (Sydney Sixers)

18 October	Highveld Lions (South Africa); 137/9 (20 overs)	v	(Australia) Sydney Sixers; 141/5 (19 overs)	(Australia) Sydney Sixers won by 5 wickets
13:30; Scorecard	Highveld Lions (South Africa); 137/9 (20 overs)	v	(Australia) Sydney Sixers; 141/5 (19 overs)	Newlands, Cape Town; Umpires: Kumar Dharmasena (Sri) and Rod Tucker (Aus); Player of the match: Mitchell Starc (Sydney Sixers)
13:30; Scorecard	Gulam Bodi 61 (44); Mitchell Starc 3/19 (4 overs)		Shane Watson 47 (38); Aaron Phangiso 3/14 (4 Overs)	Newlands, Cape Town; Umpires: Kumar Dharmasena (Sri) and Rod Tucker (Aus); Player of the match: Mitchell Starc (Sydney Sixers)
Sydney Sixers won the toss and elected to field				Newlands, Cape Town; Umpires: Kumar Dharmasena (Sri) and Rod Tucker (Aus); Player of the match: Mitchell Starc (Sydney Sixers)

22 October	Sydney Sixers (Australia); 136/7 (20 overs)	v	(India) Mumbai Indians; 124/8 (20 overs)	(Australia) Sydney Sixers won by 12 runs
17:30 (D/N); Scorecard	Sydney Sixers (Australia); 136/7 (20 overs)	v	(India) Mumbai Indians; 124/8 (20 overs)	Kingsmead, Durban; Umpires: Aleem Dar (Pak) and S. Ravi (Ind); Player of the match: Steve Smith (Sydney Sixers)
17:30 (D/N); Scorecard	Steve Smith 41 (41); Munaf Patel 2/17 (4 overs)		Dwayne Smith 26 (28); Pat Cummins 2/16 (4 overs)	Kingsmead, Durban; Umpires: Aleem Dar (Pak) and S. Ravi (Ind); Player of the match: Steve Smith (Sydney Sixers)
Sydney Sixers won the toss and elected to bat				Kingsmead, Durban; Umpires: Aleem Dar (Pak) and S. Ravi (Ind); Player of the match: Steve Smith (Sydney Sixers)

=== Finals ===
==== Playoff tree ====
Semifinals
A1	(India) Delhi Daredevils	117/9 (20 overs)
B2	(South Africa) Highveld Lions	139/5 (20 overs)
A2	(Scotland) Nashua Titans	163/5 (20 overs)
B1	(Australia) Sydney Sixers	164/8 (20 overs)

Final
B2	(South Africa) Highveld Lions	121 (20 overs)
B1	(Australia) Sydney Sixers	124/0 (12.3 overs)

==== Semi-final ====
26 October	Nashua Titans (South Africa); 163/5 (20 overs)	v	(Australia) Sydney Sixers; 164/8 (20 overs)	(Australia) Sydney Sixers won by 2 wickets
17:30 (D/N); Scorecard	Nashua Titans (South Africa); 163/5 (20 overs)	v	(Australia) Sydney Sixers; 164/8 (20 overs)	SuperSport Park, Centurion; Umpires: Asad Rauf (Pak) and Marais Erasmus (SA); Player of the match: Stephen O'Keefe (Sydney Sixers)
17:30 (D/N); Scorecard	David Wiese 61 (28); Mitchell Starc 2/33 (4 overs)		Michael Lumb 33 (20); Alfonso Thomas 2/36 (4 overs)	SuperSport Park, Centurion; Umpires: Asad Rauf (Pak) and Marais Erasmus (SA); Player of the match: Stephen O'Keefe (Sydney Sixers)
Nashua Titans won the toss and elected to bat; Sydney Sixers qualify for the Final and Nashua Titans are eliminated as a result of this match				SuperSport Park, Centurion; Umpires: Asad Rauf (Pak) and Marais Erasmus (SA); Player of the match: Stephen O'Keefe (Sydney Sixers)

==== Final ====
28 October	Highveld Lions (South Africa); 121 (20 overs)	v	(Australia) Sydney Sixers; 124/0 (12.3 overs)	(Australia) Sydney Sixers won by 10 wickets
17:30 (D/N); Scorecard	Highveld Lions (South Africa); 121 (20 overs)	v	(Australia) Sydney Sixers; 124/0 (12.3 overs)	New Wanderers Stadium, Johannesburg; Umpires: Aleem Dar (Pak) and Simon Taufel (Aus); Player of the match: Michael Lumb (Sydney Sixers)
17:30 (D/N); Scorecard	Jean Symes 51 (46); Josh Hazlewood 3/22 (4 overs)		Michael Lumb 82* (42); Sohail Tanvir 0/16 (3 overs)	New Wanderers Stadium, Johannesburg; Umpires: Aleem Dar (Pak) and Simon Taufel (Aus); Player of the match: Michael Lumb (Sydney Sixers)
Sydney Sixers won the toss and elected to field; Sydney Sixers win the 2012 Champions League Twenty20 as a result of this match				New Wanderers Stadium, Johannesburg; Umpires: Aleem Dar (Pak) and Simon Taufel (Aus); Player of the match: Michael Lumb (Sydney Sixers)

== Big Bash League ==
=== Regular season ===
==== Ladder ====
Pos	Team	Pld	W	L	NR	Pts	NRR	Qualification
1	Melbourne Renegades	8	7	1	0	14	0.791	Advanced to semi-finals
2	Perth Scorchers	8	5	3	0	10	1.322	Advanced to semi-finals
3	Melbourne Stars	8	5	3	0	10	0.246	Advanced to semi-finals
4	Brisbane Heat (C)	8	4	4	0	8	0.464	Advanced to semi-finals
5	Adelaide Strikers	8	4	4	0	8	−0.162	
6	Hobart Hurricanes	8	4	4	0	8	−0.569	
7	Sydney Sixers	8	3	5	0	6	−0.380	
8	Sydney Thunder	8	0	8	0	0	−1.360	

(C) Champions

==== Matches ====
Times shown are in Australian Western Standard Time (UTC+08) for Perth, Australian Central Daylight Time (UTC+10:30) for Adelaide, Australian Eastern Standard Time (UTC+10:00) for Brisbane and Australian Eastern Daylight Time (UTC+11:00) for all remaining venues.

8 December	Sydney Thunder; 5/143 (20 overs)	v	(H) Sydney Sixers; 3/147 (18.4 overs)	Sydney Sixers won by 7 wickets
19:00 (D/N); Scorecard	Sydney Thunder; 5/143 (20 overs)	v	(H) Sydney Sixers; 3/147 (18.4 overs)	Sydney Cricket Ground; Attendance: 15,279; Umpires: Ashley Barrow & Tony Ward; Player of the match: Brad Haddin (Sydney Sixers)
19:00 (D/N); Scorecard	Ryan Carters 33* (24); Luke Feldman 2/19 (4 overs)		Brad Haddin 59 (48); Chris Tremain 2/27 (4 overs)	Sydney Cricket Ground; Attendance: 15,279; Umpires: Ashley Barrow & Tony Ward; Player of the match: Brad Haddin (Sydney Sixers)
Sydney Sixers won the toss and elected to field				Sydney Cricket Ground; Attendance: 15,279; Umpires: Ashley Barrow & Tony Ward; Player of the match: Brad Haddin (Sydney Sixers)

16 December	(H) Sydney Sixers; 9/113 (20 overs)	v	Perth Scorchers; 3/114 (19.2 overs)	Perth Scorchers won by 7 wickets
19:00 (D/N); Scorecard	(H) Sydney Sixers; 9/113 (20 overs)	v	Perth Scorchers; 3/114 (19.2 overs)	Sydney Cricket Ground; Attendance: 9,057; Umpires: Gerard Abood & Tony Ward; Player of the match: Michael Beer (Perth Scorchers)
19:00 (D/N); Scorecard	Stephen O'Keefe 29 (34); Michael Beer 2/19 (4 overs)		Herschelle Gibbs 40 (42); Luke Feldman 1/13 (3.2 overs)	Sydney Cricket Ground; Attendance: 9,057; Umpires: Gerard Abood & Tony Ward; Player of the match: Michael Beer (Perth Scorchers)
Perth Scorchers won the toss and elected to field				Sydney Cricket Ground; Attendance: 9,057; Umpires: Gerard Abood & Tony Ward; Player of the match: Michael Beer (Perth Scorchers)

21 December	(H) Melbourne Stars; 6/177 (20 overs)	v	Sydney Sixers; 5/156 (20 overs)	Melbourne Stars won by 21 runs
19:00 (D/N); Scorecard	(H) Melbourne Stars; 6/177 (20 overs)	v	Sydney Sixers; 5/156 (20 overs)	Melbourne Cricket Ground, Melbourne; Attendance: 10,260; Umpires: Ashley Barrow & Tony Ward; Player of the match: Glenn Maxwell (Melbourne Stars)
19:00 (D/N); Scorecard	Glenn Maxwell 82 (50); Ian Moran 3/30 (3 overs)		Steve O'Keefe 42 (35); Shane Warne 2/32 (4 overs)	Melbourne Cricket Ground, Melbourne; Attendance: 10,260; Umpires: Ashley Barrow & Tony Ward; Player of the match: Glenn Maxwell (Melbourne Stars)
Sydney Sixers won the toss and elected to field				Melbourne Cricket Ground, Melbourne; Attendance: 10,260; Umpires: Ashley Barrow & Tony Ward; Player of the match: Glenn Maxwell (Melbourne Stars)

23 December	Sydney Sixers; 6/135 (20 overs)	v	(H) Adelaide Strikers; 1/136 (15.5 overs)	Adelaide Strikers won by 9 wickets
19:00 (D/N); Scorecard	Sydney Sixers; 6/135 (20 overs)	v	(H) Adelaide Strikers; 1/136 (15.5 overs)	Adelaide Oval; Attendance: 5,892; Umpires: Simon Fry & Sam Nogajski; Player of the match: Tim Ludeman (Adelaide Strikers)
19:00 (D/N); Scorecard	Steve Smith 58 (43); Shaun Tait 2/13 (3 overs)		Tim Ludeman 71 (43); Steve O'Keefe 1/24 (2.5 overs)	Adelaide Oval; Attendance: 5,892; Umpires: Simon Fry & Sam Nogajski; Player of the match: Tim Ludeman (Adelaide Strikers)
Sydney Sixers won the toss and elected to bat				Adelaide Oval; Attendance: 5,892; Umpires: Simon Fry & Sam Nogajski; Player of the match: Tim Ludeman (Adelaide Strikers)

26 December	(H) Sydney Sixers; 8/154 (20 overs)	v	Hobart Hurricanes; 3/158 (19.5 overs)	Hobart Hurricanes won by 7 wickets
19:00 (D/N); Scorecard	(H) Sydney Sixers; 8/154 (20 overs)	v	Hobart Hurricanes; 3/158 (19.5 overs)	Sydney Cricket Ground; Attendance: 11,005; Umpires: Steve Davis & Damien Mealey; Player of the match: Ricky Ponting (Hobart Hurricanes)
19:00 (D/N); Scorecard	Michael Lumb 34 (22); Ben Laughlin 4/31 (4 overs)		Ricky Ponting 63 (52); Luke Feldman 2/21 (4 overs)	Sydney Cricket Ground; Attendance: 11,005; Umpires: Steve Davis & Damien Mealey; Player of the match: Ricky Ponting (Hobart Hurricanes)
Hobart Hurricanes won the toss and elected to field				Sydney Cricket Ground; Attendance: 11,005; Umpires: Steve Davis & Damien Mealey; Player of the match: Ricky Ponting (Hobart Hurricanes)

30 December	(H) Sydney Thunder; 6/132 (20 overs)	v	Sydney Sixers; 6/136 (19 overs)	Sydney Sixers won by 4 wickets
19:00 (D/N); Scorecard	(H) Sydney Thunder; 6/132 (20 overs)	v	Sydney Sixers; 6/136 (19 overs)	Stadium Australia, Sydney; Attendance: 20,986; Umpires: Gerard Abood & Ashley Barrow; Player of the match: Daniel Hughes (Sydney Sixers)
19:00 (D/N); Scorecard	Usman Khawaja 66 (47); Josh Lalor 2/20 (4 overs)		Daniel Hughes 51 (36); Dirk Nannes 3/24 (4 overs)	Stadium Australia, Sydney; Attendance: 20,986; Umpires: Gerard Abood & Ashley Barrow; Player of the match: Daniel Hughes (Sydney Sixers)
Sydney Thunder won the toss and elected to bat				Stadium Australia, Sydney; Attendance: 20,986; Umpires: Gerard Abood & Ashley Barrow; Player of the match: Daniel Hughes (Sydney Sixers)

7 January	(H) Brisbane Heat; 9/127 (20 overs)	v	Sydney Sixers; 5/128 (19 overs)	Sydney Sixers won by 5 wickets
19:00 (D/N); Scorecard	(H) Brisbane Heat; 9/127 (20 overs)	v	Sydney Sixers; 5/128 (19 overs)	The Gabba, Woolloongabba, Brisbane; Attendance: 14,362; Umpires: Bruce Oxenford & Damien Mealey; Player of the match: Michael Lumb (Sydney Sixers)
19:00 (D/N); Scorecard	Luke Pomersbach 37 (33); Stephen O'Keefe 3/21 (4 overs)		Michael Lumb 61* (55); Ben Cutting 2/9 (3 overs)	The Gabba, Woolloongabba, Brisbane; Attendance: 14,362; Umpires: Bruce Oxenford & Damien Mealey; Player of the match: Michael Lumb (Sydney Sixers)
Brisbane Heat won the toss and elected to bat				The Gabba, Woolloongabba, Brisbane; Attendance: 14,362; Umpires: Bruce Oxenford & Damien Mealey; Player of the match: Michael Lumb (Sydney Sixers)

9 January	Melbourne Renegades; 5/178 (20 overs)	v	Sydney Sixers (H); 149 (20 overs)	Melbourne Renegades won by 29 runs
19:00 (D/N); Scorecard	Melbourne Renegades; 5/178 (20 overs)	v	Sydney Sixers (H); 149 (20 overs)	Sydney Cricket Ground; Attendance: 17,801; Umpires: Gerard Abood & Ashley Barrow; Player of the match: Alex Hales (Melbourne Renegades)
19:00 (D/N); Scorecard	Alex Hales 89 (52); Moisés Henriques 1/9 (1 over)		Stephen O'Keefe 41 (29); Nathan Rimmington 3/27 (4 overs)	Sydney Cricket Ground; Attendance: 17,801; Umpires: Gerard Abood & Ashley Barrow; Player of the match: Alex Hales (Melbourne Renegades)
Melbourne Renegades won the toss and elected to bat; Twenty20 debut: Fawad Ahmed (Melbourne Renegades)				Sydney Cricket Ground; Attendance: 17,801; Umpires: Gerard Abood & Ashley Barrow; Player of the match: Alex Hales (Melbourne Renegades)

=== Finals ===
The Sixers poor season saw them finish seventh with only three wins. This was not good enough to qualify for the finals series and thus also ensuring they would not be able to defend their Champions League Twenty20 title.
