= Ian Saxelby =

English cricketer

Personal information
- Full name: Ian David Saxelby
- Born: 22 May 1989 (age 37); Nottingham, Nottinghamshire, England
- Batting: Right-handed
- Bowling: Right-arm fast-medium
- Role: Bowler

Domestic team information
- Years: Team
- 2008–2014: Gloucestershire
- FC debut: 22 July 2008 Gloucestershire v Middlesex
- Last FC: 11 May 2014 Gloucestershire v Surrey
- LA debut: 26 April 2009 Gloucestershire v Surrey
- Last LA: 27 July 2012 Gloucestershire v Netherlands

Career statistics
Competition	FC	LA	T20
Matches	40	17	20
Runs scored	650	30	24
Batting average	15.85	6.00	3.42
100s/50s	0/1	0/0	0/0
Top score	60*	7*	7*
Balls bowled	5,636	604	411
Wickets	109	22	23
Bowling average	30.59	29.59	23.69
5 wickets in innings	3	0	0
10 wickets in match	1	0	0
Best bowling	6/48	4/31	4/16
Catches/stumpings	12/–	0/–	3/–
- Source: CricInfo, 28 January 2023

Ian David Saxelby (born 22 May 1989) is an English former professional cricketer. He played for Gloucestershire County Cricket Club between 2008 and 2014 as a right-handed batsman and right-arm medium-fast bowler. He was born at Nottingham in 1989 and educated at Oakham School where he captained the school cricket XI.

== Playing career ==
Saxelby made his Second XI debut for the Nottinghamshire team in 2006 in a 50-over Second XI Trophy match in which Faf du Plessis and Josh Mierkalns made a double-century and a century respectively. In July and August 2008 Saxelby appeared for England under-19s against New Zealand under-19s in two under-19 Test matches and three under-19 One Day Internationals.

Saxelby made his first-class debut earlier in July 2008 for Gloucestershire against Middlesex. He suffered a freak injury in 2009 when he dislocated his shoulder getting out of a swimming pool, after enjoying a good start to the season. He missed all of the 2010 season after dislocating the shoulder again during a friendly match at the start of the season.

In 2011, Saxelby took an impressive 49 County Championship wickets, which earned him a three-year contract. In August 2012, after taking 35 wickets during the season, Saxelby was ruled out for the rest of the season after suffering a knee injury. Coach John Bracewell was concerned that by October, Saxelby was not making good progress and he missed the entire 2013 season. Shortly after the start of the following season he broke down again with the same injury. His knee required surgery and he was forced to retire from cricket as a result. He has since worked in the insurance industry.

== Career best performances ==
As of 28 January 2023

	Batting				Bowling (innings)			
	Score	Fixture	Venue	Season	Figures	Fixture	Venue	Season
First-class	60 not out	Gloucestershire v Northamptonshire	Northampton	2009	6/48	Gloucestershire v Leicestershire	Cheltenham	2012
List A	7 not out	Gloucestershire v Surrey	Bristol	2009	4/31	Gloucestershire v Surrey	Bristol	2009
Twenty20	7 not out	Gloucestershire v Northamptonshire	Bristol	2012	4/16	Gloucestershire v Northamptonshire	Bristol	2012

== Family ==
Saxelby's uncle, Kevin Saxelby, played for Nottinghamshire between 1978 and 1990. Another uncle, Mark Saxelby, played for Nottinghamshire, Durham and Derbyshire between 1989 and 2000. He died in 2000, committing suicide due to long-term clinical depression.
