= 2012 Twenty20 Cup =

English Twenty20 cricket competition

2012 Friends Life t20
- Dates: 12 June 2012 – 25 August 2012
- Administrator: England and Wales Cricket Board
- Cricket format: Twenty20
- Tournament format(s): Group stage and knockout
- Champions: Hampshire Royals (2nd title)
- Participants: 18
- Matches: 97
- Attendance: 359,612 (3,707 per match)
- Most runs: Phillip Hughes, Worcestershire (402)
- Most wickets: Mitchell Starc, Yorkshire (21)
- Official website: friendslife.co.uk/t20

The 2012 FriendsLife T20 was the tenth edition of what would later become the T20 Blast, England's premier domestic Twenty20 competition. The competition ran from 12 June to 25 August 2012. The teams in the tournament remained the same as the previous season.

The schedule of the tournament had been widely criticised the previous season and the ECB had decided to reduce the minimum number of days in which a county would play from 92 to 86 for 2012. This meant a change in format from 2 groups of 9, from which the top 4 would qualify to the quarter-finals, to an arrangement with 3 groups of 6. The format of the knock-out rounds (quarter-finals) remain unchanged. This reduces the number of matches in the competition from 151 to 97 in a return to the format of the 2008 and 2009 editions of the Twenty20 Cup.

Finals Day was at the SWALEC Stadium in Cardiff for the first time. Hampshire Royals and Yorkshire Carnegie, as the winners and runners-up of the tournament respectively, qualified for the 2012 Champions League Twenty20.

In the quarter-final match between Sussex and Gloucestershire, Scott Styris scored the equal third-fastest century in T20 history, after making 100 not out from 37 balls. In the same match, Gloucestershire's James Fuller conceded 38 runs from one over.

== Format ==
The 18 teams are divided into three groups of six and each group plays a double round-robin tournament. The top two teams from each group and the top two third-placed teams qualify for the knockout stage: a three-round single-elimination tournament. The top team from each group and the best second-placed team will each play in a different quarter-final at their home ground. A free draw determines the placement of the remaining four teams and the semi-final and final match-ups.

== Teams ==
Team	Location	County	Division	Home ground	Coach	Captain	Overseas player(s)
Derbyshire Falcons	Derby	Derbyshire	North	County Ground	Karl Krikken	Wayne Madsen	(Australia) Usman Khawaja and (Pakistan) Rana Naved-ul-Hasan
Durham Dynamos	Chester-le-Street	County Durham	North	Riverside Ground	Geoff Cook	Phil Mustard	(South Africa) Herschelle Gibbs and (South Africa) Johann Myburgh
Essex Eagles	Chelmsford	Essex	South	County Ground	Paul Grayson	James Foster	(New Zealand) James Franklin
Gloucestershire Gladiators	Bristol	Gloucestershire	Midlands/Wales/West	Nevil Road	John Bracewell	Hamish Marshall	(Sri Lanka) Muttiah Muralitharan
Hampshire Royals	Southampton	Hampshire	South	Rose Bowl	Giles White	James Adams	(Pakistan) Shahid Afridi and (Australia) Glenn Maxwell
Kent Spitfires	Canterbury	Kent	South	St Lawrence Ground	Jimmy Adams	Rob Key	(Cricket West Indies) Brendan Nash
Lancashire Lightning	Manchester	Lancashire	North	Old Trafford	Peter Moores	Glen Chapple	(Pakistan) Yasir Arafat and (South Africa) Ashwell Prince
Leicestershire Foxes	Leicester	Leicestershire	North	Grace Road	Phil Whitticase	Matthew Hoggard	(Pakistan) Abdul Razzaq and (Cricket West Indies) Ramnaresh Sarwan
Middlesex Panthers	London	Middlesex	South	Lord's	Richard Scott	Neil Dexter	(Australia) Chris Rogers
Northamptonshire Steelbacks	Northampton	Northamptonshire	Midlands/Wales/West	County Ground	David Capel	Andrew Hall	(Sri Lanka) Chaminda Vaas and (Australia) Cameron White
Nottinghamshire Outlaws	Nottingham	Nottinghamshire	North	Trent Bridge	Mick Newell	Chris Read	(Australia) Adam Voges
Somerset	Taunton	Somerset	Midlands/Wales/West	County Ground	Andy Hurry	Marcus Trescothick	(South Africa) Richard Levi and (South Africa) Albie Morkel
Surrey Lions	London	Surrey	South	The Oval	Chris Adams	Rory Hamilton-Brown	(India) Murali Kartik and (Australia) Dirk Nannes
Sussex Sharks	Hove	Sussex	South	County Cricket Ground	Mark Robinson	Michael Yardy	(New Zealand) Scott Styris
Warwickshire Bears	Birmingham	Warwickshire	Midlands/Wales/West	Edgbaston	Ashley Giles	Jim Troughton	(New Zealand) Jeetan Patel
Welsh Dragons	Cardiff	Glamorgan	Midlands/Wales/West	Sophia Gardens	Matthew Mott	Jim Allenby	(Australia) Shaun Marsh and (Australia) Marcus North
Worcestershire Royals	Worcester	Worcestershire	Midlands/Wales/West	New Road	Steve Rhodes	Daryl Mitchell	(Australia) Phillip Hughes and (Pakistan) Sohail Tanvir
Yorkshire Carnegie	Leeds	Yorkshire	North	Headingley Carnegie	Jason Gillespie	Andrew Gale	(South Africa) David Miller and (Australia) Mitchell Starc

== Group stage ==
=== Midlands/Wales/West Division ===
==== Table ====
Pos	Team	Pld	W	L	T	NR	Pts	NRR
1	Somerset	10	5	2	0	3	13	0.275
2	Gloucestershire Gladiators	10	4	2	0	4	12	0.248
3	Worcestershire Royals	10	4	3	0	3	11	0.578
4	Warwickshire Bears	10	4	3	0	3	11	−0.033
5	Welsh Dragons	10	2	3	0	5	9	−0.708
6	Northamptonshire Steelbacks	10	1	7	0	2	4	−0.611

==== Results ====
	Gloucestershire Gladiators	Northamptonshire Steelbacks	Somerset	Warwickshire Bears	Welsh Dragons	Worcestershire Royals
Gloucestershire Gladiators		Gloucestershire; 8 runs	Abandoned; No result	Warwickshire; 7 wickets	Abandoned; No result	Gloucestershire; 7 wickets
Northamptonshire Steelbacks	Gloucestershire; 8 wickets (D/L)		Somerset; 7 wickets	Warwickshire; 7 wickets	Abandoned; No result	Worcestershire; 14 runs
Somerset	Gloucestershire; 9 wickets	Somerset; 5 wickets		Somerset; 63 runs	Somerset; 4 wickets	Worcestershire; 54 runs
Warwickshire Bears	Abandoned; No result	Warwickshire; 6 wickets	Abandoned; No result		Glamorgan; 22 runs (D/L)	Abandoned; No result
Welsh Dragons	Abandoned; No result	Northamptonshire; 9 wickets	No result	Glamorgan; 5 runs (D/L)		Abandoned; No result
Worcestershire Royals	Worcestershire; 47 runs	Abandoned; No result	Somerset; 7 wickets	Warwickshire; 8 wickets	Glamorgan; 19 runs	

Home team won	Away team won

==== Fixtures ====
13 June
Scorecard

Somerset (H); 191/6 (20 overs)	v	Warwickshire Bears; 128 (18.5 overs)

Somerset won by 63 runs
County Ground, Taunton

14 June
Scorecard

Gloucestershire Gladiators (H)	v	Somerset

Match abandoned
County Ground, Bristol

14 June (D/N)
Scorecard

Northamptonshire Steelbacks (H); 70/3 (9.3 overs)	v	Welsh Dragons

Match abandoned
County Ground, Northampton

15 June (D/N)
Scorecard

Warwickshire Bears (H)	v	Worcestershire Royals

Match abandoned
Edgbaston, Birmingham

17 June
Scorecard

Warwickshire Bears; 141/5 (18 overs)	v	Welsh Dragons (H); 62/1 (8 overs)

Glamorgan won by 5 runs (D/L)
Sophia Gardens, Cardiff

17 June
Scorecard

Worcestershire Royals (H); 213/2 (20 overs)	v	Gloucestershire Gladiators; 166 (18.5 overs)

Worcestershire won by 47 runs
County Ground, New Road, Worcester

17 June
Scorecard

Northamptonshire Steelbacks; 137/5 (20 overs)	v	Somerset (H); 141/5 (19.5 overs)

Somerset won by 5 wickets
County Ground, Taunton

19 June (D/N)
Scorecard

Northamptonshire Steelbacks; 149/4 (20 overs)	v	Warwickshire Bears (H); 152/4 (19 overs)

Warwickshire won by 6 wickets
Edgbaston, Birmingham

21 June (D/N)
Scorecard

Somerset; 59/1 (7.1 overs)	v	Warwickshire Bears (H)

No result
Edgbaston, Birmingham

22 June
Scorecard

Gloucestershire Gladiators (H); 139/9 (20 overs)	v	Northamptonshire Steelbacks; 131/8 (20 overs)

Gloucestershire won by 8 runs
County Ground, Bristol

22 June
Scorecard

Welsh Dragons; 178/5 (20 overs)	v	Somerset (H); 182/6 (19.5 overs)

Somerset won by 4 wickets
County Ground, Taunton

22 June
Scorecard

Worcestershire Royals (H); 120/7 (20 overs)	v	Warwickshire Bears; 123/2 (16.3 overs)

Warwickshire won by 8 wickets
County Ground, New Road, Worcester

23 June
Scorecard

Worcestershire Royals; 142/5 (20 overs)	v	Northamptonshire Steelbacks (H); 128/5 (20 overs)

Worcestershire won by 14 runs
County Ground, Northampton

23 June (D/N)
Scorecard

Welsh Dragons (H)	v	Gloucestershire Gladiators

Match abandoned
Sophia Gardens, Cardiff

26 June (D/N)
Scorecard

Northamptonshire Steelbacks (H); 115/6 (20 overs)	v	Somerset; 116/3 (13.4 overs)

Somerset won by 7 wickets
County Ground, Northampton

27 June
Scorecard

Gloucestershire Gladiators (H); 122/7 (20 overs)	v	Warwickshire Bears; 125/3 (18.1 overs)

Warwickshire won by 7 wickets
County Ground, Bristol

29 June
Scorecard

Somerset (H); 140/8 (20 overs)	v	Gloucestershire Gladiators; 141/1 (14.4 overs)

Gloucestershire won by 9 wickets
County Ground, Taunton

29 June
Scorecard

Worcestershire Royals (H); 164/5 (20 overs)	v	Welsh Dragons; 145/6 (20 overs)

Worcestershire won by 19 runs
County Ground, New Road, Worcester

29 June (D/N)
Scorecard

Northamptonshire Steelbacks (H); 153/7 (20 overs)	v	Warwickshire Bears; 154/3 (16.1 overs)

Warwickshire won by 7 wickets
County Ground, Northampton

30 June (D/N)
Scorecard

Welsh Dragons (H); 110/9 (20 overs)	v	Northamptonshire Steelbacks; 111/1 (13.1 overs)

Northamptonshire won by 9 wickets
Sophia Gardens, Cardiff

1 July
Scorecard

Worcestershire Royals; 173/7 (20 overs)	v	Somerset (H); 119 (19.1 overs)

Worcestershire won by 54 runs
County Ground, Taunton

2 July
Scorecard

Gloucestershire Gladiators (H)	v	Welsh Dragons

Match abandoned
County Ground, Bristol

3 July
Scorecard

Welsh Dragons (H)	v	Worcestershire Royals

Match abandoned
Sophia Gardens, Cardiff

5 July
Scorecard

Worcestershire Royals; 159/6 (20 overs)	v	Gloucestershire Gladiators (H); 160/3 (18 overs)

Gloucestershire won by 7 wickets
County Ground, Bristol

6 July
Scorecard

Welsh Dragons (H)	v	Somerset

Match abandoned
Sophia Gardens, Cardiff

6 July
Scorecard

Worcestershire Royals (H)	v	Northamptonshire Steelbacks

Match abandoned
County Ground, New Road, Worcester

6 July (D/N)
Scorecard

Warwickshire Bears (H)	v	Gloucestershire Gladiators

Match abandoned
Edgbaston, Birmingham

8 July
Scorecard

Northamptonshire Steelbacks (H); 31/4 (8.3 overs)	v	Gloucestershire Gladiators; 23/2 (2.2 overs)

Gloucestershire won by 8 wickets (D/L)
County Ground, Northampton

8 July
Scorecard

Welsh Dragons; 173/5 (20 overs)	v	Warwickshire Bears (H); 61/4 (9 overs)

Glamorgan won by 22 runs (D/L)
Edgbaston, Birmingham

8 July
Scorecard

Worcestershire Royals (H); 119/7 (20 overs)	v	Somerset; 120/3 (18.5 overs)

Somerset won by 7 wickets
County Ground, New Road, Worcester

=== North Division ===
==== Table ====
Pos	Team	Pld	W	L	T	NR	Pts	NRR
1	Yorkshire Carnegie	10	7	1	0	2	16	0.863
2	Nottinghamshire Outlaws	10	5	1	0	4	14	1.877
3	Durham Dynamos	10	4	4	1	1	10	−0.251
4	Lancashire Lightning	10	3	4	1	2	9	0.106
5	Derbyshire Falcons	10	2	6	0	2	6	−0.561
6	Leicestershire Foxes	10	2	7	0	1	5	−1.352

==== Results ====
	Derbyshire Falcons	Durham Dynamos	Lancashire Lightning	Leicestershire Foxes	Nottinghamshire Outlaws	Yorkshire Carnegie
Derbyshire Falcons		Durham; 5 wickets	Derbyshire; 17 runs (D/L)	Leicestershire; 4 wickets	Abandoned; No result	Yorkshire; 41 runs
Durham Dynamos	Durham; 8 wickets		Match tied	Durham; 9 wickets	Nottinghamshire; 7 wickets	Yorkshire; 12 runs
Lancashire Lightning	Derbyshire; 3 wickets	Lancashire; 8 wickets		Lancashire; 8 wickets	Abandoned; No result	Abandoned; No result
Leicestershire Foxes	Leicestershire; 8 runs	Abandoned; No result	Lancashire; 11 runs		Nottinghamshire; 6 wickets	Yorkshire; 4 runs
Nottinghamshire Outlaws	No Result	Nottinghamshire; 41 runs	Nottinghamshire; 8 wickets (D/L)	Nottinghamshire; 69 runs		Yorkshire; 6 wickets
Yorkshire Carnegie	Yorkshire; 21 runs	Durham; 2 runs	Yorkshire; 19 runs	Yorkshire; 22 runs	Abandoned; No result	

Home team won	Away team won

==== Fixtures ====
12 June
Scorecard

Leicestershire Foxes (H); 96 (17.3 overs)	v	Nottinghamshire Outlaws; 98/4 (13 overs)

Nottinghamshire won by 6 wickets
Grace Road, Leicester

14 June (D/N)
Scorecard

Lancashire Lightning; 168/6 (20 overs)	v	Derbyshire Falcons (H); 118/5 (11.3 overs)

Derbyshire won by 17 runs (D/L)
County Ground, Derby

15 June
Scorecard

Lancashire Lightning; 154/6 (20 overs)	v	Leicestershire Foxes (H); 143/8 (20 overs)

Lancashire won by 11 runs
Grace Road, Leicester

15 June
Scorecard

Nottinghamshire Outlaws (H)	v	Derbyshire Falcons

Match abandoned
Trent Bridge, Nottingham

15 June
Scorecard

Durham Dynamos; 142/6 (20 overs)	v	Yorkshire Carnegie (H); 140/8 (20 overs)

Durham won by 2 runs
Headingley, Leeds

17 June
Scorecard

Durham Dynamos (H); 114/5 (20 overs)	v	Nottinghamshire Outlaws; 117/3 (16.2 overs)

Nottinghamshire won by 7 wickets
Riverside Ground, Chester-le-Street

17 June
Scorecard

Yorkshire Carnegie (H); 170/4 (20 overs)	v	Leicestershire Foxes; 148 (20 overs)

Yorkshire won by 22 runs
Headingley, Leeds

18 June (D/N)
Scorecard

Yorkshire Carnegie; 150/5 (20 overs)	v	Derbyshire Falcons (H); 109 (20 overs)

Yorkshire won by 41 runs
County Ground, Derby

20 June
Scorecard

Leicestershire Foxes; 179/4 (20 overs)	v	Lancashire Lightning (H); 180/2 (19 overs)

Lancashire won by 8 wickets
Old Trafford, Manchester

20 June (D/N)
Scorecard

Derbyshire Falcons (H); 141/6 (20 overs)	v	Durham Dynamos; 142/5 (18.5 overs)

Durham won by 5 wickets
County Ground, Derby

22 June
Scorecard

Yorkshire Carnegie; 171/6 (20 overs)	v	Durham Dynamos (H); 159 (19.5 overs)

Yorkshire won by 12 runs
Riverside Ground, Chester-le-Street

22 June
Scorecard

Leicestershire Foxes (H); 80/3 (8 overs)	v	Derbyshire Falcons; 72/6 (8 overs)

Leicestershire won by 8 runs
Grace Road, Leicester

22 June (D/N)
Scorecard

Lancashire Lightning (H)	v	Nottinghamshire Outlaws

Match abandoned
Old Trafford, Manchester

24 June
Scorecard

Nottinghamshire Outlaws; 105/3 (14 overs)	v	Yorkshire Carnegie (H)

No result
North Marine Road Ground, Scarborough

25 June (D/N)
Scorecard

Durham Dynamos; 121 (19.2 overs)	v	Lancashire Lightning (H); 122/2 (14 overs)

Lancashire won by 8 wickets
Old Trafford, Manchester

27 June
Scorecard

Derbyshire Falcons; 131/7 (20 overs)	v	Durham Dynamos (H); 132/2 (17.1 overs)

Durham won by 8 wickets
Riverside Ground, Chester-le-Street

27 June
Scorecard

Yorkshire Carnegie; 151/9 (20 overs)	v	Leicestershire Foxes (H); 147/9 (20 overs)

Yorkshire won by 4 runs
Grace Road, Leicester

29 June
Scorecard

Nottinghamshire Outlaws (H); 210/3 (20 overs)	v	Durham Dynamos; 167/9 (20 overs)

Nottinghamshire won by 41 runs
Trent Bridge, Nottingham

29 June
Scorecard

Yorkshire Carnegie (H); 180/6 (20 overs)	v	Lancashire Lightning; 161/5 (20 overs)

Yorkshire won by 19 runs
Headingley, Leeds

29 June (D/N)
Scorecard

Derbyshire Falcons (H); 171/3 (20 overs)	v	Leicestershire Foxes; 173/6 (20 overs)

Leicestershire won by 4 wickets
County Ground, Derby

1 July
Scorecard

Leicestershire Foxes; 114/7 (20 overs)	v	Durham Dynamos (H); 117/1 (13.2 overs)

Durham won by 9 wickets
Riverside Ground, Chester-le-Street

1 July
Scorecard

Lancashire Lightning (H); 122/8 (20 overs)	v	Derbyshire Falcons; 124/7 (18.5 overs)

Derbyshire won by 3 wickets
Old Trafford, Manchester

3 July
Scorecard

Lancashire Lightning; 178/4 (20 overs)	v	Nottinghamshire Outlaws (H); 52/2 (4 overs)

Nottinghamshire won by 8 wickets (D/L)
Trent Bridge, Nottingham

5 July (D/N)
Scorecard

Nottinghamshire Outlaws (H); 148/6 (20 overs)	v	Yorkshire Carnegie; 150/4 (17.4 overs)

Yorkshire won by 6 wickets
Trent Bridge, Nottingham

6 July
Scorecard

Leicestershire Foxes (H)	v	Durham Dynamos

Match abandoned
Grace Road, Leicester

6 July (D/N)
Scorecard

Derbyshire Falcons (H)	v	Nottinghamshire Outlaws

Match abandoned
County Ground, Derby

6 July (D/N)
Scorecard

Lancashire Lightning (H)	v	Yorkshire Carnegie

Match abandoned
Old Trafford, Manchester

8 July
Scorecard

Lancashire Lightning; 133/8 (20 overs)	v	Durham Dynamos (H); 133/7 (20 overs)

Match tied
Riverside Ground, Chester-le-Street

8 July
Scorecard

Nottinghamshire Outlaws (H); 196/3 (20 overs)	v	Leicestershire Foxes; 127/9 (20 overs)

Nottinghamshire won by 69 runs
Trent Bridge, Nottingham

8 July
Scorecard

Yorkshire Carnegie (H); 180/5 (20 overs)	v	Derbyshire Falcons; 159/9 (20 overs)

Yorkshire won by 21 runs
Headingley, Leeds

=== South Division ===
==== Table ====
Pos	Team	Pld	W	L	T	NR	Pts	NRR
1	Sussex Sharks	10	6	1	0	3	15	1.389
2	Hampshire Royals	10	5	2	0	3	13	0.693
3	Essex Eagles	10	5	4	0	1	11	−0.032
4	Kent Spitfires	10	4	5	0	1	9	−0.465
5	Middlesex Panthers	10	3	7	0	0	6	−0.210
6	Surrey Lions	10	3	7	0	0	6	−0.700

==== Results ====
	Essex Eagles	Hampshire Royals	Kent Spitfires	Middlesex Panthers	Surrey Lions	Sussex Sharks
Essex Eagles		Hampshire; 6 wickets	Essex; 3 runs	Essex; 2 wickets	Essex; 3 wickets	Sussex; 4 wickets
Hampshire Royals	Abandoned; No result		Kent; 3 runs	Middlesex; 6 wickets	Hampshire; 7 wickets	Abandoned; No result
Kent Spitfires	Kent; 23 runs	Hampshire; 6 wickets		Middlesex; 48 runs	Kent; 8 wickets	No result
Middlesex Panthers	Essex; 6 runs	Hampshire; 4 wickets	Middlesex; 3 wickets		Surrey; 28 runs (D/L)	Sussex; 11 runs
Surrey Lions	Surrey; 17 runs	Hampshire; 19 runs	Kent; 48 runs	Middlesex; 1 wicket		Sussex; 6 wickets
Sussex Sharks	Sussex; 19 runs	No Result	Sussex; 83 runs	Sussex; 21 runs	Surrey; 7 wickets (D/L)	

Home team won	Away team won

==== Fixtures ====
12 June
Scorecard

Kent Spitfires (H)	v	Sussex Sharks

Match abandoned
St Lawrence Ground, Canterbury^{1}

13 June (D/N)
Scorecard

Surrey Lions (H); 128/8 (20 overs)	v	Essex Eagles; 111/9 (20 overs)

Surrey won by 17 runs
Kennington Oval, London

14 June (D/N)
Scorecard

Surrey Lions; 149/4 (20 overs)	v	Middlesex Panthers (H); 99/8 (16 overs)

Surrey won by 28 runs (D/L)
Lord's, London

14 June (D/N)
Scorecard

Sussex Sharks (H)	v	Hampshire Royals

Match abandoned
County Ground, Hove

17 June
Scorecard

Surrey Lions; 116/7 (20 overs)	v	Kent Spitfires (H); 120/2 (16.2 overs)

Kent won by 8 wickets
Kent County Cricket Ground, Beckenham

17 June
Scorecard

Sussex Sharks; 143/8 (20 overs)	v	Middlesex Panthers (H); 132/8 (20 overs)

Sussex won by 11 runs
Lord's, London

18 June (D/N)
Scorecard

Hampshire Royals (H); 157/6 (20 overs)	v	Middlesex Panthers; 161/4 (19.2 overs)

Middlesex won by 6 wickets
The Rose Bowl, Southampton

20 June (D/N)
Scorecard

Essex Eagles (H); 158/6 (20 overs)	v	Kent Spitfires; 155 (20 overs)

Essex won by 3 runs
County Ground, Chelmsford

21 June (D/N)
Scorecard

Essex Eagles; 155/6 (20 overs)	v	Middlesex Panthers (H); 149/9 (20 overs)

Essex won by 6 runs
Lord's, London

22 June (D/N)
Scorecard

Surrey Lions; 144/9 (20 overs)	v	Essex Eagles (H); 145/7 (20 overs)

Essex won by 3 wickets
County Ground, Chelmsford

22 June (D/N)
Scorecard

Kent Spitfires; 151/5 (20 overs)	v	Hampshire Royals (H); 148/6 (20 overs)

Kent won by 3 runs
The Rose Bowl, Southampton

22 June (D/N)
Scorecard

Sussex Sharks (H); 161/4 (20 overs)	v	Middlesex Panthers; 140/6 (20 overs)

Sussex won by 21 runs
County Ground, Hove

24 June
Scorecard

Sussex Sharks (H); 209/6 (20 overs)	v	Essex Eagles; 190 (20 overs)

Sussex won by 19 runs
County Ground, Hove

24 June
Scorecard

Kent Spitfires (H); 135/6 (20 overs)	v	Hampshire Royals; 138/4 (18.2 overs)

Hampshire won by 6 wickets
St Lawrence Ground, Canterbury

26 June (D/N)
Scorecard

Middlesex Panthers; 207/2 (20 overs)	v	Kent Spitfires (H); 159/7 (20 overs)

Middlesex won by 48 runs
St Lawrence Ground, Canterbury

27 June
Scorecard

Middlesex Panthers (H); 156/2 (20 overs)	v	Hampshire Royals; 160/6 (19.2 overs)

Hampshire won by 4 wickets
Old Deer Park, Richmond

28 June (D/N)
Scorecard

Essex Eagles (H); 177/4 (20 overs)	v	Sussex Sharks; 181/6 (19.5 overs)

Sussex won by 4 wickets
County Ground, Chelmsford

29 June (D/N)
Scorecard

Essex Eagles (H); 176/4 (20 overs)	v	Hampshire Royals; 177/4 (18 overs)

Hampshire won by 6 wickets
County Ground, Chelmsford

29 June (D/N)
Scorecard

Sussex Sharks (H); 212/6 (20 overs)	v	Kent Spitfires; 129 (19.4 overs)

Sussex won by 83 runs
County Ground, Hove

30 June
Scorecard

Surrey Lions; 94/6 (20 overs)	v	Hampshire Royals (H); 95/3 (15.3 overs)

Hampshire won by 7 wickets
The Rose Bowl, Southampton

2 July (D/N)
Scorecard

Surrey Lions (H); 84/4 (10 overs)	v	Hampshire Royals; 63/0 (5.4 overs)

Hampshire won by 19 runs (D/L)
Kennington Oval, London

3 July (D/N)
Scorecard

Surrey Lions (H); 106/6 (16.2 overs)	v	Sussex Sharks; 110/4 (11.4 overs)

Sussex won by 6 wickets
Kennington Oval, London

5 July (D/N)
Scorecard

Middlesex Panthers; 109 (19.5 overs)	v	Essex Eagles (H); 110/8 (17.4 overs)

Essex won by 2 wickets
County Ground, Chelmsford

5 July (D/N)
Scorecard

Kent Spitfires; 136/8 (20 overs)	v	Surrey Lions (H); 88 (17.3 overs)

Kent won by 48 runs
Kennington Oval, London

6 July (D/N)
Scorecard

Sussex Sharks; 203/5 (17.4 overs)	v	Hampshire Royals (H)

No result
The Rose Bowl, Southampton

6 July (D/N)
Scorecard

Essex Eagles; 149/5 (20 overs)	v	Kent Spitfires (H); 126/9 (20 overs)

Essex won by 23 runs
St Lawrence Ground, Canterbury

6 July (D/N)
Scorecard

Surrey Lions (H); 154/4 (20 overs)	v	Middlesex Panthers; 157/9 (19.5 overs)

Middlesex won by 1 wicket
Kennington Oval, London

8 July
Scorecard

Hampshire Royals (H)	v	Essex Eagles

Match abandoned
The Rose Bowl, Southampton

8 July
Scorecard

Middlesex Panthers (H); 124/9 (20 overs)	v	Kent Spitfires; 125/7 (19 overs)

Kent won by 3 wickets
Uxbridge Cricket Club Ground, Uxbridge

8 July
Scorecard

Sussex Sharks (H); 104/0 (9 overs)	v	Surrey Lions; 64/3 (4.4 overs)

Surrey won by 7 wickets (D/L)
County Ground, Hove

1. Game moved from Nevill Ground, Royal Tunbridge Wells due to flooding.

== Knockout stage ==
Quarter-finals
N2	Nottinghamshire Outlaws	178/7
S2	Hampshire Royals	182/6
M1	Somerset	175/6
S3	Essex Eagles	148
S1	Sussex Sharks	230/4
M2	Gloucestershire Gladiators	191/8
N1	Yorkshire Carnegie	212/5
M3	Worcestershire Royals	183/6

Semi-finals
S2	Hampshire Royals	126/4
M1	Somerset	125/6
S1	Sussex Sharks	136/8
N1	Yorkshire Carnegie	172/6

Final
S2	Hampshire Royals	150/6
N1	Yorkshire Carnegie	140/8

=== Quarter-finals ===
24 July
16:15
Scorecard

Somerset; 175/6 (20 overs)	v	Essex Eagles; 148 (18.3 overs)
James Hildreth 58 (36); Reece Topley 3/27 (4 overs)		Ryan ten Doeschate 47 (24); Lewis Gregory 4/39 (3.3 overs)

Somerset won by 27 runs
County Ground, Taunton
Umpires: Michael Gough and Richard Illingworth
Player of the match: James Hildreth (Somerset)

- Essex won the toss and elected to field

24 July
19:10 (D/N)
Scorecard

Sussex Sharks; 230/4 (20 overs)	v	Gloucestershire Gladiators; 191/8 (20 overs)
Scott Styris 100* (37); Ian Saxelby 1/48 (4 overs)		Dan Housego 47 (24); Amjad Khan 2/38 (4 overs)

Sussex won by 39 runs
County Ground, Hove
Umpires: Nigel Llong and Tim Robinson
Player of the match: Scott Styris (Sussex)

- Gloucestershire won the toss and elected to field

25 July
16:15
Scorecard

Yorkshire Carnegie; 212/5 (20 overs)	v	Worcestershire Royals; 183/6 (20 overs)
Joe Root 65 (40); Daryl Mitchell 2/23 (4 overs)		Phillip Hughes 80* (53); Mitchell Starc 3/24 (4 overs)

Yorkshire won by 29 runs
Headingley, Leeds
Umpires: Rob Bailey and Jeff Evans
Player of the match: Joe Root (Yorkshire)

- Yorkshire won the toss and elected to bat

25 July
19:10 (D/N)
Scorecard

Nottinghamshire Outlaws; 178/7 (20 overs)	v	Hampshire Royals; 182/6 (20 overs)
Samit Patel 60 (33); Glenn Maxwell 3/36 (4 overs)		Neil McKenzie 79* (49); Samit Patel 3/26 (4 overs)

Hampshire won by 4 wickets
Trent Bridge, Nottingham
Umpires: Nick Cook and Peter Hartley
Player of the match: Neil McKenzie (Hampshire)

- Hampshire won the toss and elected to field

=== Semi-finals ===
25 August
11:00
Scorecard

Yorkshire Carnegie; 172/6 (20 overs)	v	Sussex Sharks; 136/8 (20 overs)
Jonny Bairstow 68* (45); Scott Styris 3/22 (4 overs)		Chris Nash 80* (58); Tim Bresnan 2/22 (4 overs)

Yorkshire won by 36 runs
Sophia Gardens, Cardiff
Umpires: Michael Gough and Jeremy Lloyds
Player of the match: Jonny Bairstow (Yorkshire)

- Yorkshire won the toss and elected to bat

25 August
14:30
Scorecard

Somerset; 125/6 (20 overs)	v	Hampshire Royals; 126/4 (19 overs)
Craig Kieswetter 63* (57); Dimitri Mascarenhas 2/11 (4 overs)		Sean Ervine 34* (23); Lewis Gregory 1/9 (2 overs)

Hampshire won by 6 wickets
Sophia Gardens, Cardiff
Umpires: Rob Bailey and Nick Cook
Player of the match: Sean Ervine (Hampshire)

- Hampshire won the toss and elected to field

=== Final ===
25 August
18:45 (D/N)
Scorecard

Hampshire Royals; 150/6 (20 overs)	v	Yorkshire Carnegie; 140/8 (20 overs)
James Adams 43 (37); Ryan Sidebottom 2/20 (4 overs)		David Miller 72* (46); Chris Wood 3/26 (4 overs)

Hampshire won by 10 runs
Sophia Gardens, Cardiff
Umpires: Rob Bailey and Michael Gough
Player of the match: David Miller (Yorkshire)

- Hampshire won the toss and elected to bat

== Statistics ==
=== Highest team totals ===
The following table lists the five highest team scores in the season.

Team	Total	Opponent	Ground
Sussex Sharks	230/4	Gloucestershire Gladiators	County Ground, Hove
Worcestershire Royals	213/2	Gloucestershire Gladiators	New Road, Worcester
Yorkshire Carnegie	212/5	Worcestershire Royals	Headingley Carnegie, Leeds
Sussex Sharks	212/6	Kent Spitfires	County Ground, Hove
Nottinghamshire Outlaws	210/3	Durham Dynamos	Trent Bridge, Nottingham

=== Most runs ===
The top five highest run scorers (total runs) in the season are included in this table.

Player	Team	Runs	Inns	Avg	S/R	HS	100s	50s	4s	6s
Phillip Hughes	Worcestershire Royals	402	8	100.50	126.81	87*	0	4	37	7
David Miller	Yorkshire Carnegie	390	11	48.75	153.54	74*	0	4	30	21
Chris Nash	Sussex Sharks	319	10	39.87	131.27	80*	0	3	32	8
Steven Croft	Lancashire Lightning	313	8	62.60	129.33	65*	0	2	17	11
Luke Wright	Sussex Sharks	312	10	34.66	160.00	91	0	2	32	11

=== Highest scores ===
This table contains the top five highest scores of the season made by a batsman in a single innings.

Player	Team	Score	Balls	4s	6s	Opponent	Ground
James Hildreth	Somerset	107*	60	15	1	Welsh Dragons	County Ground, Taunton
Scott Styris	Sussex Sharks	100*	37	5	9	Gloucestershire Gladiators	County Ground, Hove
Luke Wright	Sussex Sharks	91	61	7	2	Middlesex Panthers	County Ground, Hove
Joe Denly	Middlesex Panthers	90*	66	11	1	Kent Spitfires	St Lawrence Ground, Canterbury
Alex Hales	Nottinghamshire Outlaws	88	51	6	4	Durham Dynamos	Trent Bridge, Nottingham

=== Most wickets ===
The following table contains the six leading wicket-takers of the season.

Player	Team	Wkts	Mts	Ave	S/R	Econ	BBI
Mitchell Starc	Yorkshire Carnegie	21	10	10.38	10.5	5.91	3/24
Chris Liddle	Sussex Sharks	17	10	11.94	9.7	7.33	5/17
Reece Topley	Essex Eagles	17	9	14.47	11.2	7.68	3/19
Dimitri Mascarenhas	Hampshire Royals	15	11	16.46	15.2	6.50	2/11
Moin Ashraf	Yorkshire Carnegie	15	12	23.93	18.8	7.63	4/18
Rich Pyrah	Yorkshire Carnegie	15	12	23.93	18.0	7.97	3/21

=== Best bowling figures ===
This table lists the top five players with the best bowling figures in the season.

Player	Team	Overs	Figures	Opponent	Ground
Chris Liddle	Sussex Sharks	4.0	5/17	Middlesex Panthers	Lord's, London
Greg Smith	Essex Eagles	3.0	5/17	Kent Spitfires	County Ground, Chelmsford
Gareth Batty	Surrey Lions	4.0	4/13	Middlesex Panthers	Lord's, London
Max Waller	Somerset	4.0	4/16	Warwickshire Bears	County Ground, Taunton
Ian Saxelby	Gloucestershire Gladiators	4.0	4/16	Northamptonshire Steelbacks	County Ground, Bristol
