= Josh Mierkalns =

English cricketer

Josh Mierkalns (born 11 September 1985) is an English former cricketer. He is a right-handed batsman and a right-arm medium-pace bowler. Mierkalns' second XI career began in 2003, when he made his debut against Yorkshire's Second XI.

Mierkalns represented the Nottinghamshire first-team in August 2006 when he played in a match against the touring West Indians. The following month he played in a Pro40 match against Durham, though he was soon dropped from the team. His county career ended after he was diagnosed with ulcerative colitis.

He was a member of the Nottinghamshire Second team which reached the final of the 2005 Second XI trophy.

He currently plays cricket for Notts & Arnold Amateur CC in the Owzat Nottinghamshire Premier League.
