= Moin Ashraf =

English cricketer (born 1992)

Personal information
- Full name: Moin Aqeeb Ashraf
- Born: 5 January 1992 (age 34); Bradford, Yorkshire, England
- Batting: Right-handed
- Bowling: Right-arm fast-medium
- Role: Bowler

Domestic team information
- Years: Team
- 2010–2015: Yorkshire (squad no. 23)
- 2016–2017: Leeds/Bradford MCCU
- 2016: Northamptonshire
- FC debut: 10 May 2010 Yorkshire v Loughborough MCCU
- LA debut: 8 August 2011 England Development XI v Sri Lanka A

Career statistics
Competition	FC	LA	T20
Matches	24	23	24
Runs scored	80	3	5
Batting average	5.33	1.50	2.50
100s/50s	0/0	0/0	0/0
Top score	10	3*	4
Balls bowled	2,675	930	477
Wickets	43	25	24
Bowling average	33.34	36.80	26.12
5 wickets in innings	1	0	0
10 wickets in match	0	0	0
Best bowling	5/32	3/38	4/18
Catches/stumpings	3/–	4/–	1/–
- Source: Cricinfo, 30 March 2017

Moin Aqeeb Ashraf (born 5 January 1992) is an English first-class cricketer, who played for Yorkshire County Cricket Club. His best season was in 2012 when he led Yorkshire's T20 attack with Mitchell Starc, helping Yorkshire reach the T20 finals day at Cardiff before losing to Hampshire in the final.

He was released by Yorkshire, after five years at the club, in September 2015. During the 2016 season he signed for Northants on a short-term basis, to cover for injuries within the squad.
