= Ian Moran (cricketer) =

Australian cricketer

Personal information
- Full name: Ian Anthony Moran
- Born: 16 August 1979 (age 47); Sydney, New South Wales, Australia
- Nickname: Scotty
- Height: 1.76 m (5 ft 9 in)
- Batting: Right-handed
- Bowling: Right-arm fast-medium
- Role: Bowler

Domestic team information
- Years: Team
- 2005/06: New South Wales
- 2006–2007: Scotland
- 2011/12–2012/13: Sydney Sixers (squad no. 5)
- 2014/15: Sydney Thunder
- List A debut: 30 April 2006 Scotland v Warwickshire
- Last List A: 3 June 2007 Scotland v Derbyshire
- Twenty20 debut: 8 January 2006 New South Wales v Queensland
- Last Twenty20: 12 January 2015 Sydney Thunder v Adelaide Strikers

Career statistics
| Competition | List A | Twenty20 |
|---|---|---|
| Matches | 13 | 9 |
| Runs scored | 215 | 33 |
| Batting average | 19.54 | 11.00 |
| 100s/50s | 0/0 | 0/0 |
| Top score | 45 | 20 |
| Balls bowled | 396 | 90 |
| Wickets | 14 | 8 |
| Bowling average | 27.64 | 18.50 |
| 5 wickets in innings | 1 | 0 |
| 10 wickets in match | 0 | 0 |
| Best bowling | 5/28 | 3/21 |
| Catches/stumpings | 0/– | 1/– |
- Source: ESPNcricinfo, 26 December 2016

Ian Anthony Moran (born 16 August 1979) is an Australian cricketer who has played List A cricket for Scotland and Twenty20 cricket for New South Wales, the Sydney Sixers and the Sydney Thunder.

== List A career ==
Moran made his List A debut playing for Scotland against Warwickshire in the 2006 Cheltenham & Gloucester Trophy. In that match he took his first List A wicket, opener Neil Carter for 135, breaking a 181-run partnership. He played all nine matches for Scotland in the tournament including the team's 52 run win over Northamptonshire where Moran was named man of the match finishing with 5 wickets for 28 runs, a career best.

Suffering an injury, Moran didn't return until midway through the following season for Scotland. During his first match back against Nottinghamshire, he was hit for 32 runs off a single over and fell for a golden duck. He fared much better the following match taking 2/17 from four overs against Lancashire in Scotland's only win of the tournament. Moran played his final List A match on 3 June 2007 against Derbyshire and did not play in Scotland's final two matches. In all, Moran played 13 List A matches and took 14 wickets at an average of 27.64.

== Twenty20 career ==
Moran played his first Twenty20 (T20) match for his native New South Wales in January 2006 as part of the inaugural Twenty20 Big Bash season. Playing against Queensland at North Sydney Oval, Moran took his career best figures of 3/28. New South Wales made it to the final of the competition where they faced off against Victoria. New South Wales was unable to contain a very strong Bushrangers outfit, with Moran failing to take any wickets. New South Wales lost the match by 93 runs.

Six years would pass until Moran would play another T20 match. Moran signed with the new Sydney Sixers franchise in the revamped Australian domestic Twenty20 competition, the Big Bash League. His first match for the Sixers came midway through the inaugural season where in a rain interrupted match against the Sydney Thunder, Moran scored just 1 run and did not bowl. He then played in the Sixers' semi final win against the Hobart Hurricanes, taking the wicket of Tom Triffitt and conceding just 25 runs. In the final against the Perth Scorchers, Moran helped the Sixers take out the inaugural Big Bash League title. Whilst he remained wicketless, he was part of the bowling attack which restricted the Scorchers to 156 runs. Sydney managed to run down the target with seven balls to spare to win by seven wickets.

The Sixers would go on to win the T20 Champions League in South Africa in October 2012 and whilst Moran did not play in any matches, he did receive estimated windfall of AUD$80,000 to $90,000. The 33-year-old PE teacher at Trinity Grammar School took leave without pay in order to attend the tournament.

Moran played a further two matches for the Sixers in BBL during December 2012. In his match against the Melbourne Stars at the Melbourne Cricket Ground, he took three wickets for 30 runs – his second three-wicket haul in T20s.

Moran was called in as injury replacement player for the Sydney Thunder during the 2014–15 Big Bash League season. Replacing Andrew McDonald who suffered a hamstring injury, Moran played only one match – against the Adelaide Strikers on 15 January. During the rain affected match which ended in a no result, Moran finished with figures of 1/19 taking the wicket of Travis Head. This would be his final match, finishing with eight wickets at an average of 18.50 from his nine T20 matches.
