= Kevin Saxelby =

English cricketer (born 1959)

Personal information
- Full name: Kevin Saxelby
- Born: 23 February 1959 (age 67); Worksop, Nottinghamshire, England
- Batting: Right-handed
- Bowling: Right-arm fast
- Role: Bowler
- Relatives: Brother, Mark Saxelby

Domestic team information
- Years: Team
- 1978–1990: Nottinghamshire

Career statistics
Competition	First-class	List A
Matches	136	162
Runs scored	1,112	249
Batting average	11.70	12.45
100s/50s	–/1	–/–
Top score	59*	23*
Balls bowled	18,636	7,555
Wickets	300	224
Bowling average	32.35	25.90
5 wickets in innings	6	6
10 wickets in match	1	–
Best bowling	6/49	6/30
Catches/stumpings	31/–	27/–
- Source: CricketArchive, 10 November 2024

Kevin Saxelby (born 23 February 1959 in Worksop) is an English first-class cricketer who played for Nottinghamshire from 1978 to 1990. His brother Mark was also a cricketer, although their careers overlapped by only a couple of years.
