= Mark Saxelby =

English cricketer

Personal information
- Full name: Mark Saxelby
- Born: 4 January 1969; Worksop, Nottinghamshire, England
- Died: 12 October 2000 (aged 31); Beeston, Nottingham, England
- Batting: Left-handed
- Bowling: Right-arm medium pace
- Role: Batter
- Relatives: Brother, Kevin Saxelby

Domestic team information
- Years: Team
- 1989–1993: Nottinghamshire
- 1994–1995: Durham
- 1996: Cheshire
- 2000: Derbyshire

Career statistics
Competition	First-class	List A
Matches	61	79
Runs scored	2,916	1,442
Batting average	29.45	24.86
100s/50s	2/17	1/6
Top score	181	100*
Balls bowled	1,312	1,510
Wickets	11	34
Bowling average	82.09	37.23
5 wickets in innings	–	–
10 wickets in match	–	–
Best bowling	3/41	4/29
Catches/stumpings	18/–	15/–
- Source: CricketArchive, 10 November 2024

Mark Saxelby (4 January 1969 – 12 October 2000) was an English cricketer. He was a left-handed batsman and a right-arm medium-pace bowler.

He started his eleven-year cricketing career at Nottinghamshire, where he enjoyed a fair few successful seasons and consistently averaged in the 30s with the bat without making himself overly known or feared. However, he was soon off to Durham, who spotted him after an excellent century innings in the Sunday leagues. Despite being keen to keep both Mark and his brother Kevin Saxelby for as long as possible, he was to move to Durham and make 181 on his Championship debut for the team.

However, a season after reaching 1000 runs for the first time, Saxelby was once again packing his bags and moving, after patchy form saw him down to number five in the batting lineup.

After some years in minor league cricket, and a 1996 MCC Trophy win for Cheshire, Saxelby was signed by Derbyshire in 2000 and only appeared for them after an injury to Mathew Dowman left his teammate unable to play.

At the age of 31, Saxelby committed suicide by ingesting weedkiller; he was suffering from depression.
