= 2001–02 Sheffield Shield season =

Australian cricket tournament

- Cricket format: First-class
- Tournament format(s): Double round-robin & Final
- Champions: Queensland (5th title)
- Participants: 6
- Matches: 31
- Player of the series: Brad Hodge (Victoria) & Jimmy Maher (Queensland)
- Most runs: Martin Love (Queensland) (1,108)
- Most wickets: Michael Kasprowicz (Queensland) (49)

The 2001–02 Sheffield Shield season known as the Pura Cup was the 100th season of the Sheffield Shield, the domestic first-class cricket competition of Australia. Queensland won the championship.

== Table ==
Team	Played	Won	Lost	Tied	Drawn	N/R	Points
Queensland	10	5	2	0	3	0	36
Tasmania	10	4	2	0	4	0	30
Western Australia	10	3	3	0	5	0	26
South Australia	10	3	5	0	2	0	20
Victoria	10	2	4	0	4	0	16
New South Wales	10	2	4	0	4	0	12

== Final ==
22–26 March 2002
Scorecard

(H) Queensland	v	Tasmania
302 (114 overs); Andrew Symonds 91* (157); Shane Jurgensen 5/68 (35 overs)		141 (56.2 overs); Michael Dighton 29 (64); Michael Kasprowicz 5/60 (20 overs)
368 (124.5 overs); Brendan Nash 96 (216); Shane Jurgensen 6/104 (34 overs)		294 (99.5 overs); Michael Di Venuto 65 (147); Andrew Symonds 4/45 (22 overs)

Queensland won by 235 runs
Venue: The Gabba, Brisbane
Umpires: Simon Taufel and Steve Davis
Player of the match: Andrew Symonds (Queensland)

- Tasmania won the toss and elected to field.

== Statistics ==
=== Most runs ===
Player	Team	Mat	Inns	NO	Runs	Ave	HS	100	50
Martin Love	Queensland	11	20	3	1108	65.17	202*	2	6
Jimmy Maher	Queensland	9	17	1	1085	67.81	209	3	5
Brad Hodge	Victoria	10	18	3	858	57.2	140	4	2
Greg Blewett	South Australia	10	19	3	858	53.62	169*	4	2
Matthew Elliott	Victoria	10	20	2	780	43.33	135*	1	6

=== Most wickets ===
Player	Team	Mat	Inns	Overs	Wkts	Ave	Econ	BBI	BBM	5	10
Michael Kasprowicz	Queensland	9	17	343.5	49	22.08	3.14	5/44	9/131	2	0
Stuart Clark	New South Wales	9	17	387.0	45	23.26	2.70	5/42	8/148	4	0
Jo Angel	Western Australia	10	18	412.0	44	24.4	2.60	6/52	9/110	1	0
Paul Rofe	South Australia	10	19	410.4	41	24.68	2.46	7/52	13/112	3	1
Ashley Noffke	Queensland	10	18	345.4	38	26.31	2.89	5/31	9/143	2	0
