= 1998–99 Sheffield Shield season =

Australian cricket tournament

- Cricket format: First-class
- Tournament format(s): Double round-robin & Final
- Champions: Western Australia (15th title)
- Participants: 6
- Matches: 31
- Player of the series: Matthew Elliott (Victoria)
- Most runs: Matthew Elliott (Victoria) (925)
- Most wickets: David Saker (Victoria) (45)

The 1998–99 Sheffield Shield season was the 97th season of the Sheffield Shield, the domestic first-class cricket competition of Australia. Western Australia won the championship.

== Table ==
| Team | Played | Won | Lost | Tied | Drawn | N/R | Points |
|---|---|---|---|---|---|---|---|
| Queensland | 10 | 5 | 1 | 0 | 4 | 0 | 34 |
| Western Australia | 10 | 4 | 2 | 0 | 4 | 0 | 28 |
| Victoria | 10 | 3 | 3 | 0 | 4 | 0 | 26 |
| South Australia | 10 | 2 | 3 | 0 | 5 | 0 | 18 |
| Tasmania | 10 | 1 | 3 | 0 | 6 | 0 | 10 |
| New South Wales | 10 | 1 | 4 | 0 | 5 | 0 | 10 |

== Final ==
19–22 March 1999
Scorecard

| (H) Queensland | v | Western Australia |
| 265 (73.3 overs); Andrew Symonds 113 (116); Damien Martyn 4/30 (8.3 overs) | | 9/425d (132 overs); Simon Katich 115 (246); Damien Martyn 85 (183); Andrew Symonds 4/83 (24 overs) |
| 129 (55.5 overs); Jimmy Maher 58 (154); Jo Angel 4/20 (16 overs) |

Western Australia won by an innings and 31 runs
Venue: The Gabba, Brisbane
Umpires: Darrell Hair and Daryl Harper
Player of the match: Damien Martyn (Western Australia)

- Queensland won the toss and elected to bat.

== Statistics ==
=== Most runs ===
| Player | Team | Mat | Inns | NO | Runs | Ave | HS | 100 | 50 |
|---|---|---|---|---|---|---|---|---|---|
| Matthew Elliott | Victoria | 7 | 13 | 2 | 925 | 84.09 | 161 | 5 | 4 |
| Simon Katich | Western Australia | 11 | 20 | 4 | 909 | 56.81 | 154* | 4 | 3 |
| Michael Hussey | Western Australia | 11 | 20 | 0 | 877 | 43.85 | 187 | 1 | 7 |
| Jamie Cox | Tasmania | 10 | 17 | 1 | 863 | 53.93 | 184 | 4 | 3 |
| Jimmy Maher | Queensland | 11 | 19 | 2 | 838 | 49.29 | 208* | 1 | 6 |

=== Most wickets ===
| Player | Team | Mat | Inns | Overs | Wkts | Ave | Econ | BBI | BBM | 5 | 10 |
|---|---|---|---|---|---|---|---|---|---|---|---|
| David Saker | Victoria | 10 | 19 | 392.4 | 45 | 23.31 | 2.67 | 5/28 | 8/80 | 1 | 0 |
| Andy Bichel | Queensland | 8 | 14 | 293.5 | 39 | 22.38 | 2.97 | 6/54 | 8/65 | 3 | 0 |
| Jo Angel | Western Australia | 8 | 15 | 296.1 | 35 | 18.22 | 2.15 | 5/64 | 7/107 | 1 | 0 |
| Paul Reiffel | Victoria | 7 | 13 | 289.2 | 32 | 19.68 | 2.17 | 4/59 | 7/106 | 0 | 0 |
| Brad Young | South Australia | 8 | 16 | 449.2 | 28 | 44.17 | 2.75 | 5/52 | 6/89 | 1 | 0 |
