= Second Test, 2007–08 Border–Gavaskar Trophy =

Cricket match

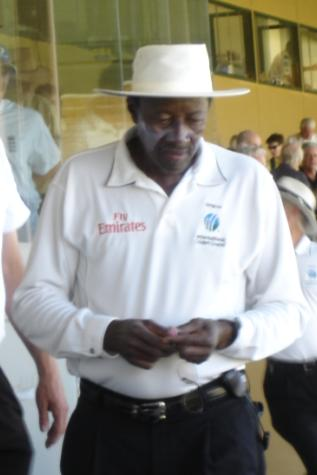
- Umpire Steve Bucknor, whose decisions in the Test were controversial and led to him being dropped from officiating in the Third Test.
Australia	India
(Australia)	(India)
463	532
112.3 overs	138.2 overs
&	&
7/401d	210
107 overs	70.5 overs
- Australia won by 122 runs
- Date: 2–6 January 2008
- Venue: Sydney Cricket Ground, Sydney
- Player of the match: Andrew Symonds (Aus)
- Umpires: Steve Bucknor (WI) and Mark Benson (Eng)

The Second Test in the Indian cricket team's tour of Australia for the 2007–08 summer was a Test cricket match played over five days at the Sydney Cricket Ground from 2 to 6 January 2008. Australia won the match by 122 runs with minutes to spare at the end of the fifth day.

The match attained notoriety owing to the number of controversial umpiring decisions given by international umpires Steve Bucknor and Mark Benson and accusations of poor sportsmanship against Australian players and Harbhajan Singh. However, twelve years after the match in 2020, in a podcast on Sky Cricket, Ricky Ponting admitted that India got the "raw end of umpiring decisions" and acknowledged that some key umpiring decisions went against India in the match. In July 2020, Steve Bucknor, who was one of the field umpires in the match, said that he made two mistakes which cost India the match. The match ended in a dramatic defeat of the Indian team in the final ten minutes of the five-day match, with some commentators suggesting that the umpiring mistakes had a major impact on the course of the match.

The result ensured that Australia retained the Border–Gavaskar Trophy, as well as taking Ricky Ponting's team to 16 consecutive Test wins, equalling the previous Test record, also held by Australia under Steve Waugh. The controversy was termed by parts of the media as Bollyline, a reference to the 1930s controversy Bodyline. The name, a portmanteau of Bodyline and Bollywood, is tongue in cheek, but by referencing Bodyline, hints at the potential seriousness of the rift between the Indians and Australians. Indeed, according to Steve Waugh, the affair "now has the potential to affect relations between the countries".

Controversies abounded; as well as the multiple umpiring incidents that were placed in the spotlight by the narrowness of the victory, Indian spinner Harbhajan Singh was charged with racial abuse in an altercation with Andrew Symonds. Harbhajan was banned by the match referee Mike Procter for three Test matches although the charges were downgraded on 29 January 2008 to the lesser charge of using abusive language and the ban was lifted. The Indian team had earlier protested and threatened to pull out of the tour. The match produced bitterness on both sides and an announcement by the Indian team that they would abandon their tour, followed by dramatic intervention by the International Cricket Council (ICC).

== Context ==
Australia had won the first Test played the previous week at the Melbourne Cricket Ground by a margin of 337 runs, needing only four days to secure victory. Australia were seeking a 16th consecutive Test win to equal the record set by Steve Waugh's team between late-1999 and early-2001.

The first match, which was also Saurav Ganguly's 100th match, had led to media consternation about the appropriateness of India's batting strategy. Rahul Dravid had been promoted up the batting order from number three to open along with Wasim Jaffer, while regular opener Dinesh Karthik was dropped prior to the first Test. This was done to create a middle-order vacancy for Yuvraj Singh, who had scored a century in India's previous Test, when he substituted for the injured Sachin Tendulkar. During the first Test, both Dravid and Jaffer failed to pass 20 in either innings, with the former attracting attention for his particularly slow and defensive approach. This allowed the Australian bowling to assert control over the Indian batsmen from the outset and prevent them from gaining the momentum at the outset. Yuvraj also failed; he was particularly fidgety in scoring 0 and 5. The failures of the rearranged line-up prompted calls for the return of Virender Sehwag, who had been taken on tour as the reserve opener. Sehwag had been dropped from the side in early-2007 and had been unproductive in recent Ranji Trophy matches in India; however, his extremely aggressive approach had been successful against Australia in the past and cricket pundits felt that he could counter-attack the Australian bowlers, rather than letting their new ball attack seize the initiative. Jaffer, Dravid and Yuvraj were all mooted as possible omissions to make way for Sehwag. Australia fielded an unchanged XI, whereas India made one change: the injured Zaheer Khan was replaced by fellow paceman Ishant Sharma, a 19-year-old playing in his third Test match.

The match was preceded by speculation as to how attractive the play would be. The first Test was played on a pitch that was slow and somewhat irregular in behaviour, and the commentators were optimistic that the second Test would lead to more attractive batting, particularly from the Indians, who had amassed 7/705 and 2/211 in their previous outing in 2003–04. Tendulkar (148* in 1991–92, 241* in 2003–04) and V. V. S. Laxman (167 in 1999–2000, 178 in 2003–04) had both scored much-lauded Test centuries at the ground.

== Scorecard ==
=== Match officials ===
- On-field umpires: Steve Bucknor (WI) and Mark Benson (Eng)
- TV umpire: Bruce Oxenford (Aus)
- Reserve umpire: Rod Tucker (Aus)
- Match referee: Mike Procter (SA)

=== Summary ===
2–6 January
Scorecard

Australia	v	India
463 (112.3 overs); Andrew Symonds 162* (226); Anil Kumble 4/106 (25.3 overs)		532 (138.2 overs); Sachin Tendulkar 154* (243); Brett Lee 5/119 (32.2 overs)
7/401d (107 overs); Michael Hussey 145* (259); Anil Kumble 4/148 (40 overs)		210 (70.5 overs); Sourav Ganguly 51 (56); Michael Clarke 3/5 (1.5 overs)

Australia won by 122 runs
Sydney Cricket Ground, Sydney
Umpires: Mark Benson (Eng) and Steve Bucknor (WI)
Player of the match: Andrew Symonds (Aus)

- Australia equalled the record of sixteen consecutive test wins set by them in 2000-01

=== Australian innings ===
Australia	First Innings		Second Innings	
Batsman	Method of dismissal	Runs	Method of dismissal	Runs
Phil Jaques	c Dhoni b R. P. Singh	0	c Yuvraj Singh b Kumble	42
Matthew Hayden	c Tendulkar b R. P. Singh	13	c Jaffer b Kumble	123
* Ricky Ponting	lbw b Harbhajan Singh	55	c Laxman b Harbhajan Singh	1
Michael Hussey	c Tendulkar b R. P. Singh	41	not out	145
Michael Clarke	lbw b Harbhajan Singh	1	c Dravid b Kumble	0
Andrew Symonds	not out	162	c Dhoni b R. P. Singh	61
+ Adam Gilchrist	c Tendulkar b R. P. Singh	7	c Yuvraj Singh b Kumble	1
Brad Hogg	c Dravid b Kumble	79	c Dravid b Harbhajan Singh	1
Brett Lee	lbw b Kumble	59	not out	4
Mitchell Johnson	c Ganguly b Kumble	28		–
Stuart Clark	lbw b Kumble	0		–
Extras		18		23
Total	(112.3 overs)	463	(7 wickets declared; 107 overs)	401

India	First Innings				Second Innings			
Bowler	Overs	Maidens	Runs	Wickets	Overs	Maidens	Runs	Wickets
R. P. Singh	26	3	124	4	16	2	74	1
Ishant Sharma	23	3	87	0	14	2	59	0
Sourav Ganguly	6	1	13	0	–	–	–	–
Harbhajan Singh	27	3	108	2	33	6	92	2
Anil Kumble	25.3	0	106	4	40	3	148	4
Sachin Tendulkar	5	0	14	0	2	0	6	0
Yuvraj Singh	–	–	–	–	2	0	11	0

=== India innings ===
India	First Innings		Second Innings (target 333)	
Batsman	Method of dismissal	Runs	Method of dismissal	Runs
Wasim Jaffer	b Lee	3	c Clarke b Lee	0
Rahul Dravid	c Hayden b Johnson	53	c Gilchrist b Symonds	38
V. V. S. Laxman	c Hussey b Hogg	109	lbw b Clark	20
Sachin Tendulkar	not out	154	b Clark	12
Saurav Ganguly	c Hussey b Hogg	67	c Clarke b Lee	51
Yuvraj Singh	lbw b Lee	12	c Gilchrist b Symonds	0
+ MS Dhoni	c Gilchrist b Lee	2	lbw b Symonds	35
* Anil Kumble	c Gilchrist b Lee	2	not out	45
Harbhajan Singh	c Hussey b Mitchell Johnson	63	c Hussey b Clarke	7
R. P. Singh	c Gilchrist b Clark	13	lbw b Clarke	0
Ishant Sharma	c & b Lee	23	c Hussey b Clarke	0
Extras		18		23
Total	(138.2 overs)	532	(70.5 overs)	210

Australia	First Innings				Second Innings			
Bowler	Overs	Maidens	Runs	Wickets	Overs	Maidens	Runs	Wickets
Brett Lee	32.2	5	119	5	13	3	34	2
Mitchell Johnson	37	2	148	2	11	4	33	0
Stuart Clark	25	3	80	1	12	4	32	2
Andrew Symonds	7	1	19	0	19	5	51	3
Brad Hogg	30	2	121	2	14	2	55	0
Michael Clarke	7	1	28	0	1.5	0	5	3

== Progress of play ==
=== Day one ===
Australia won the toss and elected to bat on a pitch offering some moisture and grass on the first morning, but predicted to be a good batting track for days two to three and slowly develop into a spinner's track by day five. After bowling a maiden to start the day, R. P. Singh dismissed Jaques, who was trying to square cut uppishly on the back foot, for a duck. In the ninth over of the day Hayden edged Singh to the left of the wicket-keeper Mahendra Singh Dhoni, who was off balance and left the catch to first slip Tendulkar. Australia were 2/27 with Ponting and Hussey at the crease.

An appeal for Ponting caught down the leg side by wicket-keeper Dhoni from Ganguly when he was on just 14 was turned down by umpire Mark Benson with Australia 2/55. Just prior to lunch, with Sharma hit for 10 runs off one over, the spinners Harbhajan Singh and Anil Kumble came into the attack. Harbhajan produced a stumping opportunity against Ponting in which the ball flicked the pad and was not gloved by Dhoni, running away for two byes. Ponting and Hussey survived to lunch with Ponting scoring a half century and Australia at 2/95.

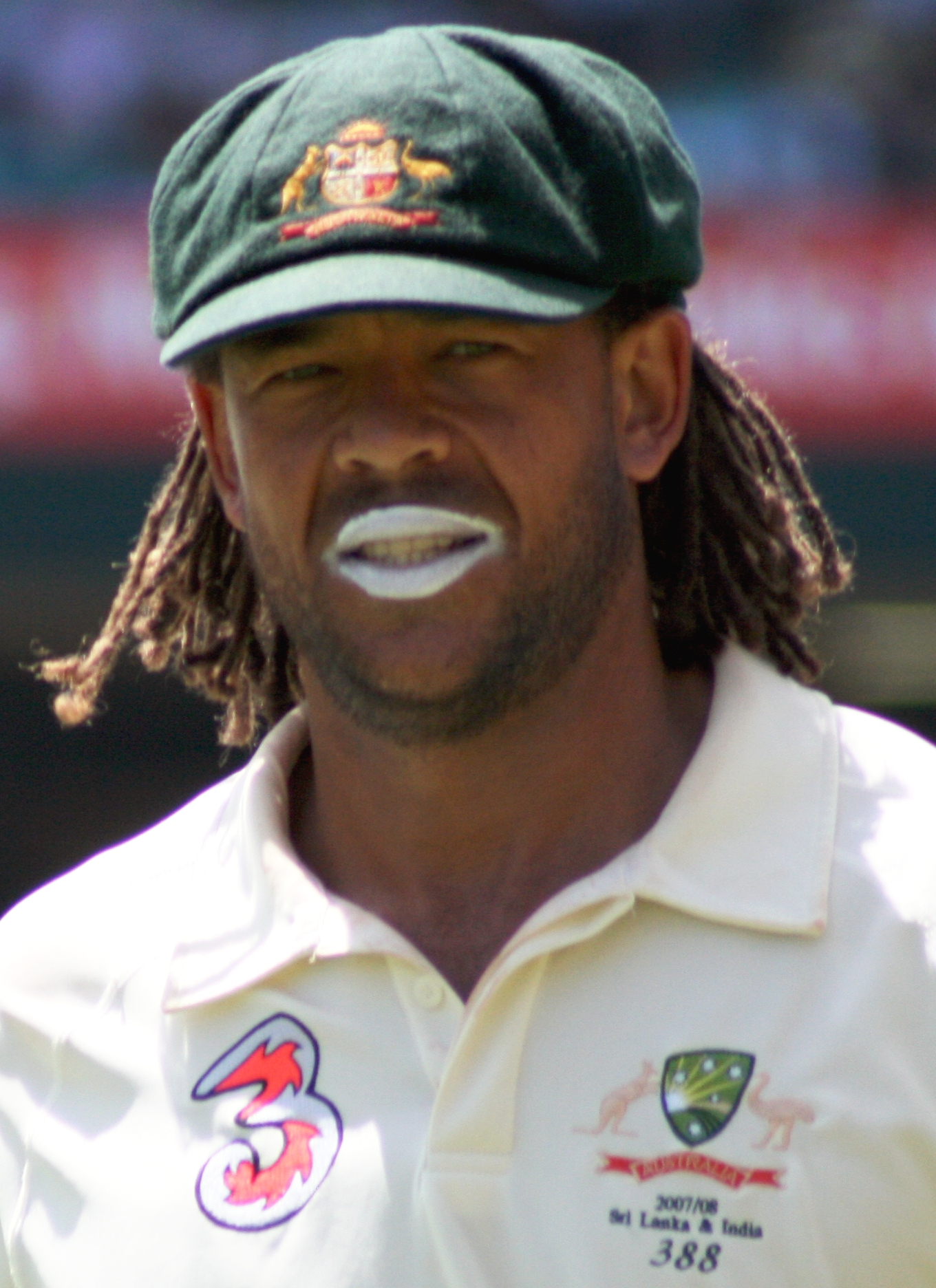
Andrew Symonds (pictured in the match), who charged Harbhajan with racial abuse towards him, scored 162 in the first innings and 61 in the second

After lunch, Ponting began looking dangerous, scoring three fours off one R. P. Singh over before he was dismissed by Harbhajan Singh adjudged LBW despite getting an inside edge on the ball prior to the ball hitting the pad. Australia were 3/119 at the end of the 30th over. Hussey edged the first ball of the next over to Tendulkar who took a low catch at first slip, bringing Andrew Symonds to the crease. Michael Clarke fell in the over after, not offering a shot to a straight, full ball on leg stump and being adjudged LBW, leaving Australia at 5/121. Singh soon drew an edge from Gilchrist to Tendulkar at first slip once again, who had to dive forward to take the catch. With only one specialist batsman remaining, Australia were at 6/135, with India having the clear upper hand.

The new batsman Brad Hogg played his natural attacking game while Symonds started slowly. The two batsmen put the pressure back on India and took the score to 6/193 in the 47th over, having scored 56 off the last 10 overs. In that over by Sharma, Symonds, then on 30, nicked the ball to wicketkeeper Dhoni, however Steve Bucknor deemed the batsman not out. By tea, Australia were 6/214 with Hogg on 47 and Symonds on 38.

Immediately after tea, Hogg brought up his 50 with a boundary through the gully region. In the 56th over with Australia on 6/238, Symonds was given not out by the third umpire in a close stumping call when replays were inconclusive as to whether his back foot was off the ground. India's frustration increased as Symonds increased his tempo and overtook Hogg, who had stalled in the 70s. Australia's run-rate continued to rise, with singles and boundaries coming frequently. Symonds reached his century in the 70th over with Australia on 6/305 and Hogg on 78. Hogg was out two overs later, edging to Dravid at slip. Brett Lee came in and survived until the end of the day. 19-year-old Sharma was jeered by the crowd for losing his run-up three times in one over. Australia finished the day at 7/376.

=== Day two ===
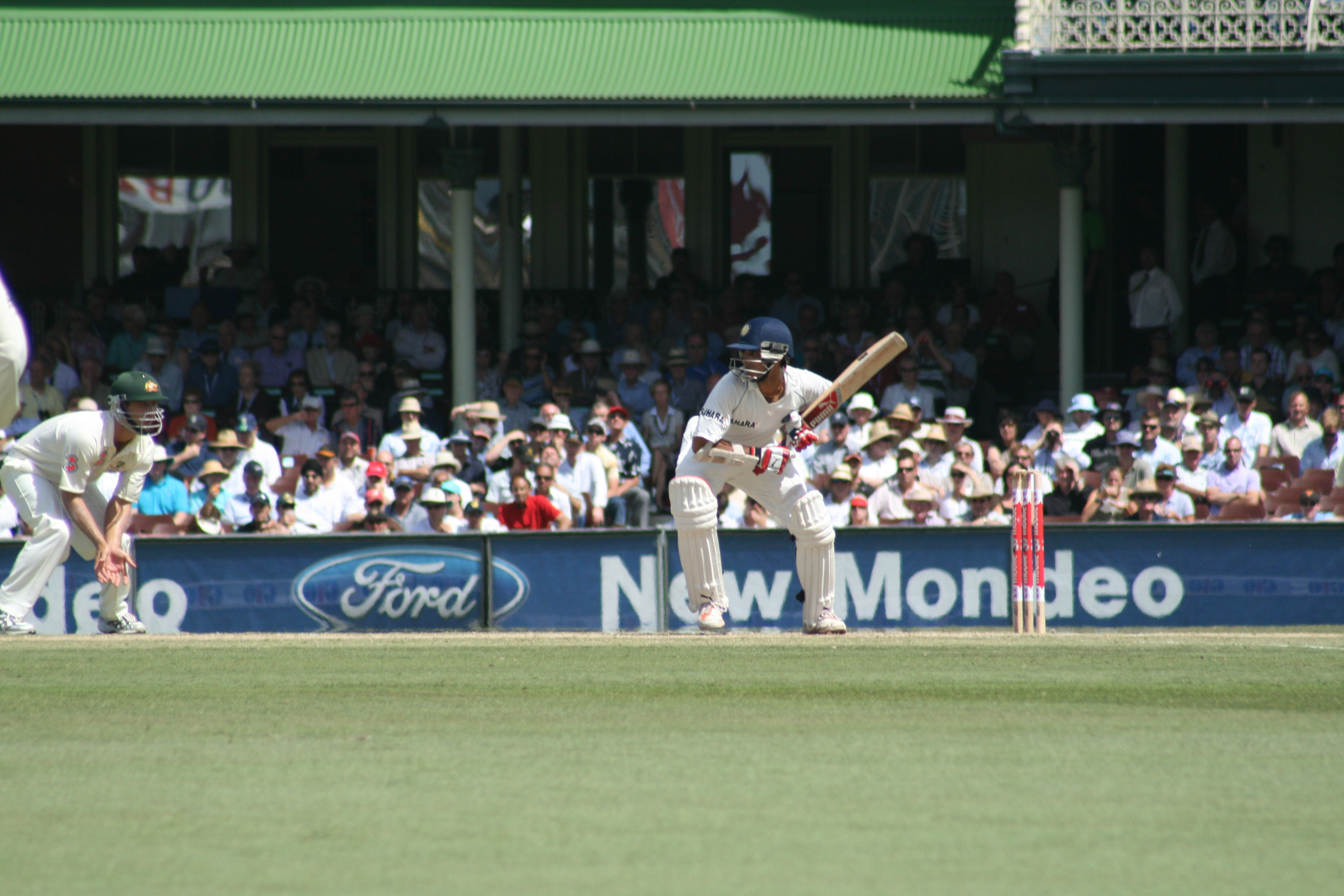
Saurav Ganguly batting during the match.

India began the day hoping to dismiss the Australian lower order quickly. A breeze had picked up speed through the ground and those bowling from the Paddington End had the advantage of running in with the breeze and bowling faster. However, Lee continued to resist, reaching 50 from 100 balls in the 98th over. Lee eventually fell five overs later for 59, leaving Australia at 8/421. Mitchell Johnson made a quick 28 from 29 balls before falling to Kumble, Stuart Clark fell two overs later and Australia were all out for 463.

Jaffer and Dravid began India's innings by successfully negotiating a tricky period of three overs prior to lunch. They did not score any runs in this period. Lee was controlled and bowled two short balls at Jaffer before trapping him with a low, swinging, yorker. Replays revealed that Lee had bowled a no-ball by overstepping the bowling mark, but the dismissal left India 1/8. Laxman and Dravid consolidated the fall of the early wicket and batted steadily, although Dravid survived a catch from a no-ball, this time from Johnson. Dravid was defensive while Laxman wristily pushed the ball to the cover and midwicket boundaries. At the end of the 15th over, a Johnson over that went for 19 runs, India were 1/69 and Laxman was on 45 from 31 balls.

After his initial fast start, Laxman settled into a more sedate rate of scoring, while Dravid continued to go slowly. After one particularly long period without scoring a run, Dravid's next single was loudly greeted with ironic applause and he raised his bat to humorously acknowledge the crowd. Dravid made 55 while Laxman scored his third century in as many Tests at the SCG, but was fortunate to survive a close LBW call. The Australians took late wickets, removing both Laxman (109) and Dravid in quick succession to leave Tendulkar and Ganguly at the crease. The new pair survived to stumps with the score on 3/215.

=== Day three ===
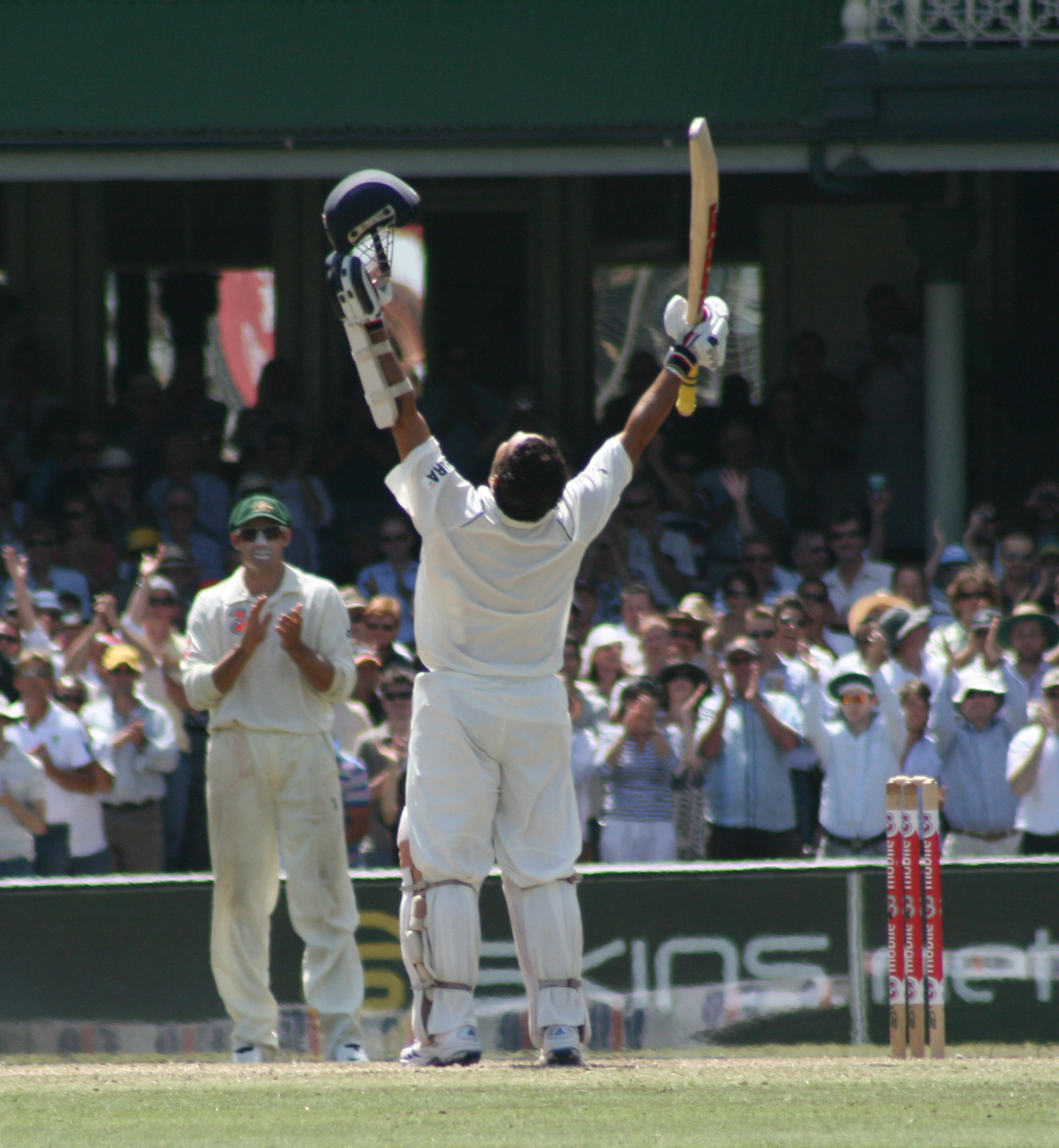
Sachin Tendulkar celebrating his century in the match.

The day started with Tendulkar and Ganguly in an aggressive mood with both batsmen lifting Brad Hogg for sixes and scoring many boundaries. Ganguly was particularly successful, reaching 67 from 78 balls before lofting Hogg to mid-off against the run of play. Tendulkar was fortunate to survive a close LBW call. When Yuvraj replaced Ganguly at the crease, India's momentum slowed as he had difficulties dealing with the second new ball, before being trapped LBW. The lunch break came soon after, and Dhoni was quickly removed by Lee as was Kumble shortly after the resumption, leaving India seven wickets down and more than a hundred runs behind. Harbhajan joined Tendulkar and scored quickly to begin with, from a series of risky shots. He then settled down and began batting in a more orthodox manner, providing steady support to Tendulkar. Harbhajan and Tendulkar passed their half-century and century respectively after the tea break, as the eighth wicket partnership passed 100. It was after Harbhajan passed 50 that his altercation with Symonds occurred, leading umpire Benson to speak to Harbhajan. Harbhajan was then dismissed and India surpassed Australia's total. Singh and Sharma then scored 13 and 23 respectively before India were bowled out. Tendulkar finished with 154 not out and raised some eyebrows for continually taking the single from the first ball of the over and handing the strike to Singh and Sharma, the latter of whom had previously only scored 17 runs at Test level. India had a 68-run lead. Hayden and Jaques were unbeaten at stumps, having survived five overs.

=== Day four ===
Australia started the day slowly as the Indian pace pair of R. P. Singh and Sharma bowled accurately. After a short rain delay, the Australians began to seize the initiative and soon wiped out their first innings deficit. Approaching lunch, Jaques was out to Kumble after a lofted sweep went to the fielder on the fence. Ponting came to the crease but was caught at silly point off the first ball he faced from Harbhajan, sparking major celebrations among the Indians, including two half-commando rolls from Harbhajan. After lunch, Hayden and Hussey rebuilt Australia's innings with the former scoring another hundred. Ponting acted as his runner due to an injury he collected while batting. Hayden was eventually dismissed by Kumble for 123 while attempting a reverse sweep. The very next ball Kumble claimed Clarke for a golden duck. On a hat trick, Kumble hit Symonds on the pads sparking a loud appeal which was turned down. Symonds and Hussey saw Australia to stumps with a healthy lead.

=== Day five ===
Australia started the final day at a slower rate than had been expected. Hussey went on to make his first century against India and finished the innings on 145 not out. Symonds also scored a half century before being caught behind trying to lift the run rate. Australia declared setting India a target of 333 to win. Some commentators, such as Tony Greig, believed that Ponting had declared too late in the innings. The situation of the game meant that India needed a run rate of well over 4, highly unlikely on the fifth-day SCG pitch. Australia needed 10 wickets to win in a minimum of 72 overs.

Before lunch Jaffer fell in the first over to Lee yet again (just as in all of his innings so far on the tour). The innings resumed after lunch but India were unable to stabilise the innings, with Tendulkar and Laxman both falling cheaply, leaving Dravid and Ganguly at the crease. A crucial moment came when Dravid and Ganguly were both batting and Dravid padded up to a ball from Symonds. It was caught by Gilchrist and Dravid was given out caught behind although replays showed the ball only hitting his pad with his bat hidden behind. In the same over, the nervous Yuvraj was out for a duck, putting India five wickets down with more than a session remaining. Ganguly was the stand-out batsman scoring 51 until being adjudged caught at slips, with the replays inconclusive, and in accordance with a pre-series agreement between the two captains, the word of the fielder was relied upon.

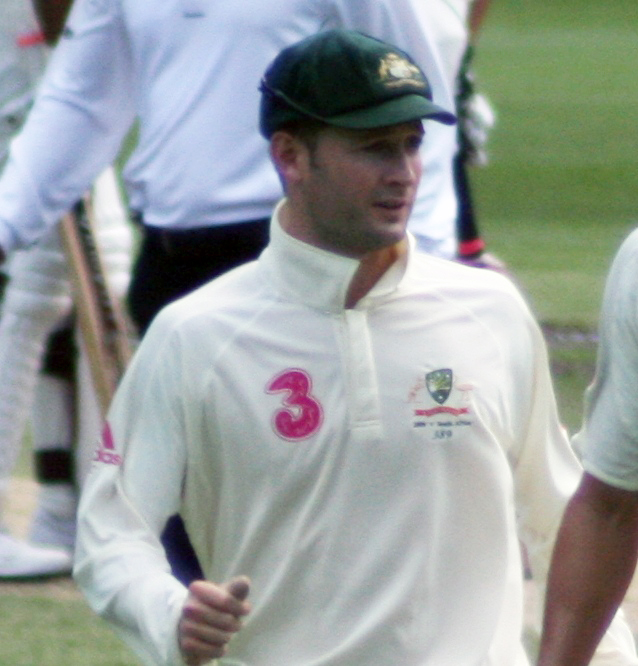
Michael Clarke took three wickets with five minutes remaining to win a drawn match.

For a period thereafter, Dhoni and Kumble began to steady India. After surviving a few appeals and inside edges that narrowly evaded the close-in fielders at the start of their innings, they began to deal with the bowling more solidly. Dhoni adopted a strategy of padding up to as many balls from the Australian spinners as possible outside off stump, but eventually, the umpire ruled against him with less than 40 minutes remaining. However, Harbhajan came in to join his captain and appeared comfortable.

With either two or three overs remaining on day five (depending on how fast the overs were bowled) the game looked certain for a draw (as India still had three wickets in hand and were 122 runs behind). But Clarke, in just his second over, took two wickets in consecutive balls to be on a hat-trick. The first ball of his second over reared after drawing a puff of dust, caught the shoulder of Harbhajan's bat and flew to Hussey at slip, and R. P. Singh padded up to his first ball and was adjudged lbw. There was an extensive delay as the last batsman Sharma took to the field with two right-handed gloves and had to wait for the correct glove to be brought out to him. This led to suspicion that the Sharma's actions were not accidental but a time-wasting ploy. Clarke took the final wicket, Sharma, in the same over, giving Australia victory. Kumble finished the day unbeaten on 45.

=== Summary ===
The test was tightly contested, setting up a fifth (final) day in which the match could have been won by either team, but was most likely to be drawn. The match featured centuries by batsmen on every day of the match. Three four-wicket hauls were achieved and Brett Lee achieved a five-wicket haul in the first innings. Both Anil Kumble and Michael Clarke were, at individual points in the game, on a hat-trick. All-rounder Andrew Symonds was at the centre of much of the action, achieving 162* and 61 with the bat and taking 3/51 in India's second innings. Symonds was awarded man of the match.

== Team reactions ==
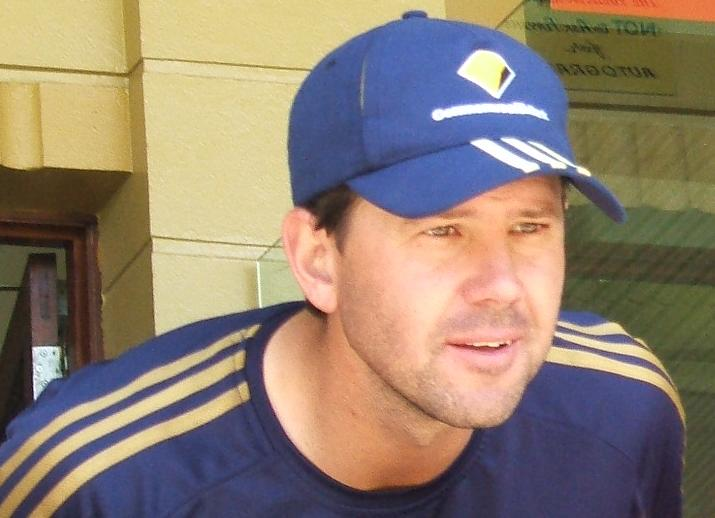
Australian captain Ricky Ponting

After the match ended the stadium erupted in cheering as the Indians walked off the field, and the Australians celebrated their record-equalling win, praising Michael Clarke. In an ABC radio interview on the ground, Ricky Ponting interrupted himself to tell Clarke to tell commentator Tony Greig that the declaration was timed exactly right. Gilchrist was also audibly heard shouting, "How about that declaration, Tony Greig". Though the teams later shook hands before heading into the dressing rooms, Kumble showed his displeasure by not shaking hands with the umpires.

India expressed their resentment by boycotting the post-match presentation ceremony. In an on-ground interview immediately after the match had finished, Anil Kumble summed up his view of the game by stating, "Only one team is playing in the spirit of the game" – a statement that alluded to Australian captain Bill Woodfull's leaked private admonishment of English manager Sir Pelham Warner during the 1932–33 Bodyline series. Chetan Chauhan, India's team manager said his players were "agitated and upset by ... the incompetent umpires here ... [and hoped] that they will not officiate again in the series".

Ponting was questioned over the umpiring decisions, the racism row, and the wicket of Ganguly, when he held his finger up to indicate to Benson that Ganguly has been caught. When interviewed later by Indian journalists, Ponting was upset, admonishing them for "questioning my [Ponting's] integrity".

The Indian media was skeptical of Ponting's comments about Clarke's disputed catch as well as another that he claimed to have caught but was rejected by the third umpire. Some media outlets questioned Ponting's integrity, with some Indian journalists calling for Ponting to be banned for appealing for what Sunil Gavaskar claimed was a grassed catch off Dhoni and claiming Clarke's legal catch of Ganguly.

The Australian players faced much questioning as a result of the fallout of the incident. They maintained that they played hard but fair. Lee outlined the competitive spirit in the team while Ponting insisted that the only player to have been outside the spirit of the game was on the Indian side.

Gilchrist commenting on the match and responding to Kumble said:

Though I have not seen his comments or heard him, but that's what I have been told about. I think that's not right. Definitely we don't feel so and we are not sorry about anything. I do not know what he is referring to. We obviously enjoyed the end result. Both the teams at any point of time in the game could say that they have the upper hand and the other time forth back. So it's topsy-turvy and we just grabbed it from the jaws of the draw I guess. At the end it was thrill. At some of the controversial ground, there was lot of talking points but yeah look we got through.

— Adam Gilchrist – Australian vice-captain

In regards to the racism issue, Ponting denied he had done anything wrong by singularly reporting Harbhajan. Ponting stated that he was obliged to refer any incidents of racism to officials, as it was widely agreed among the cricket community that racism is unacceptable.

When I heard what had taken place with Andrew I immediately informed the umpires and then left the field at the end of the over to inform our team manager, which is what we are instructed to do. Making this report is not something I wanted to do but something I had to do. I had nothing to gain personally from taking this action. I was doing the right thing by the game.

— Ricky Ponting – Australian captain

Hussey defended his team and said:

We go out to play as hard as we can but as fair as we can. Ricky Pointing has the support of our team and I would think, every cricketer in Australia. The two teams actually get on very well which is why I've been so shocked by the whole situation. There were a lot of contentious decisions, but the way I was brought up in the game you've got to accept the umpire's decision whether you agree with it or not and it takes a discipline to accept the decision and walk off without showing dissent. I hope Ricky and Anil [Kumble] can get together or the Australian and Indian management can get together and sort something out. I hope that we can work through this and get to Perth. For me it's been hard, uncompromising, tough Test cricket – some of the toughest Test cricket I've faced in my career.

— Michael Hussey – Australian cricketer

After widespread criticism of the Australian team across various media continued, a shocked Ponting promised to ensure that his team's conduct is not seen to be arrogant in future matches. He also said:

I think it's important that we sit back and look at that footage. Look at our body language. See if there are areas that we can improve on. We'll look at some of the footage, its perception and the way people see things when they're off the field. I might be talking to opposition players on the field but it might be construed by people watching on television that you're in a slanging or sledging match when that's not the case. What I want is for the Australian cricket team to be the most loved and the most respected sporting side in this country. That’s always been one of my aims and it will continue to be.
One thing I've been conscious of over the last five years I've been captain is that this team is going to be recognised as one of the all-time great Australian cricket teams. But what I've also been conscious of is making sure the guys are remembered as being good people to go along with being great cricketers.
In the last two or three seasons especially, we've actually started to change the perception, the way in which the public see us. There have been less (players reported). We're ultra-conscious of how we play the game and the spirit of cricket which we all signed on to.

— Ricky Ponting – Australian captain

Following a team meeting about the spirit of cricket and how to approach a game in which there is increased pressure, Ponting admitted the team needed to "tighten up how we [the Australians] play" although he also said "there were no glaring issues" that needed to be fixed up:

"To be 6 for 130 and win a Test with eight or nine minutes to go on the last day, you have obviously played some great cricket, but it hasn't been mentioned very much. However, that's out of our control. All I remember from the game is playing and winning one of the all-time great Tests"

— Ricky Ponting – Australian captain

However, twelve years after the match in 2020, in a podcast on Sky Cricket, Ricky Ponting admitted that India got the "raw end of umpiring decisions" and acknowledged that some key umpiring decisions went against India in the match.

The Indian players released few statements about the issue. Kumble wrote in his column in the Hindustan Times that Ponting was not willing to listen to his pleas that the issue should remain on the field. Kumble claimed that he knew through experience that such an allegation would have major ramifications both on and off the field. Tendulkar reportedly sent a text message to the BCCI saying "Harbhajan is innocent and I can assure you on this ... In this hour of crisis, the board should stand by him". Tendulkar has reportedly denied sending an SMS to Sharad Pawar. Both teams have expressed hope that this issue would not overshadow the cricket.

== List of umpiring controversies ==
Much of the criticism was attached to Bucknor; "Bucknor had one of his worst matches as an umpire and, at 61, may be nearing the end of his career. [He made] ... several errors." He had earlier also been the subject of a complaint by India for dubious decisions and inappropriate gestures.

Benson "who had a good match in Melbourne, [the previous Test] did not endear himself for rejecting what looked a plumb leg-before appeal against Mike Hussey ... On 20 at the time, Hussey went on to make an unbeaten 145."

Bucknor, from Jamaica and aged 61 at the time of the Test, was the most experienced umpire in international cricket history, having stood in a record 120 Tests, and is the only umpire to have officiated in over 100 Tests. He had also stood in 167 One Day Internationals including five Cricket World Cup finals up until the Sydney Test. Benson is from England and aged 49, is a former international and first-class player and had stood in 21 Tests and 61 ODIs up to that point. Both umpires were part of the ten-member Elite Panel of ICC Umpires.

According to Cricinfo, published reports stated that as many as 8 out of 11 controversial umpiring decisions went against the Indians. The major umpiring controversies were identified by Cricinfo, the Hindustan Times and Star Cricket who were referring to live footage of the match:

=== Australian 1st Innings ===
- Ricky Ponting (17) given not out by Mark Benson – Ponting attempted a leg glance off his pads while facing the medium pacers of Sourav Ganguly. He edged it back to wicketkeeper Mahendra Singh Dhoni. The appeal was turned down by the umpire. Ponting went on to score 55 runs.
- Ricky Ponting (55) given out by Mark Benson – Ponting inside edged bowler Harbhajan Singh back onto his back pad. He was adjudged LBW after an Indian appeal to the umpire.
- Andrew Symonds (30) given not out by Steve Bucknor – Symonds attempted a push outside off to the bowling of Ishant Sharma, but managed to edge the ball to the wicketkeeper Dhoni. The Indian appeal for caught behind was turned down by Bucknor. Symonds went on to score 162*.
- Andrew Symonds (48) given not out by third umpire Bruce Oxenford – Symonds lifted his back foot while beaten by Anil Kumble, Dhoni appealed for a stumping which was referred to the third umpire. While analysing the video replays, Channel Nine commentators Mark Taylor, Michael Slater and Ian Healy speculated that it was out. The third umpire turned down the appeal, commentators at Cricinfo saying "in by a whisker, make that half a whisker". Symonds went on to score 162*.
- Andrew Symonds (148) given not out by Steve Bucknor – Symonds attempted to slide his back-foot into the crease when beaten by Harbhajan Singh, Dhoni appealed for a stumping but Bucknor did not pass the request to the third umpire, adjudging Symonds not out. Cricinfo commentators said "he just appeared to have some part of his foot grounded behind the line". Symonds went on to score 162*.

=== Indian 1st innings ===
- Wasim Jaffer (3) given out by Mark Benson – Jaffer bowled by a yorker from Brett Lee. Replays show that Lee's front foot was close to outside the crease which would make it a no-ball, however the evidence was not conclusive.
- VVS Laxman (16) given not out by Mark Benson – Laxman shaped to flick a full ball from Brett Lee down the leg side, further replays indicate the ball would probably have struck middle and leg or leg stump. Laxman went on to score 109.
- Sachin Tendulkar (36) given not out by Steve Bucknor – Tendulkar was struck low on the pad in front of the stumps by the second ball of the 79th over of the Indian innings bowled by Michael Clarke. Bucknor adjudged it not out. Tendulkar went on to score 154 not out.

=== Australian 2nd Innings ===
- Michael Hussey (22) given not out by Mark Benson – Hussey is struck on the inside of the right pad deep in the crease off a ball that turned and kept low off the bowling of Anil Kumble. Hussey went on to score 145*.
- Michael Hussey (45) given not out by Mark Benson – Hussey turns the full face of the bat to the leg side and gets a fine touch to wicket-keeper Dhoni off the bowling of Rudra Pratap Singh. Hussey went on to score 145*.

=== Indian 2nd innings ===
- Rahul Dravid (38) given out by Steve Bucknor – Dravid tucked bat and glove behind his pads as he successfully padded away a delivery from Andrew Symonds. Adam Gilchrist caught the ball and appealed for caught behind and Bucknor gave it out. Replays revealed a small deflection of the pads going almost straight into Gilchrist's hands.
- Sourav Ganguly (51) given out by Mark Benson – While the TV evidence was inconclusive as to the correctness of the decision, the manner in which it was delivered has generated controversy. Sourav Ganguly edged the ball to Michael Clarke at slip who was engulfed by his teammates in celebration of an apparent catch. Umpire Benson appeared unsure as to whether it carried and instead of referring to third umpire asked captain Ricky Ponting for clarification.

== Fallout ==
=== Background of racism allegations ===
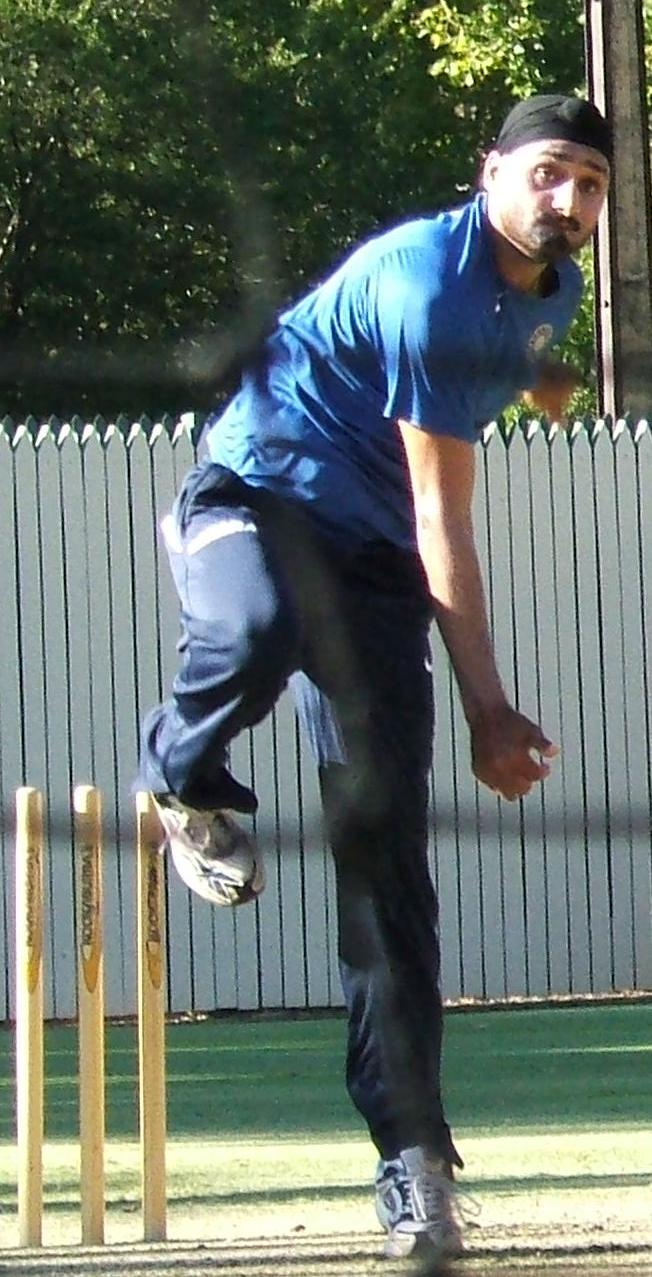
Harbhajan Singh, accused of calling Andrew Symonds a monkey, bowling in the nets.

During Australia's previous tour of India for seven ODIs in October 2007, Symonds, the only non-white Australian player, was subjected to monkey chants from some members of the Indian crowd at the fifth ODI in Vadodara.

Before the start of the tour, Symonds had expressed his displeasure over the celebrations in India over the Twenty20 World Cup win preceding the series. The tournament was won by India after defeating Australia in the semi-finals and Pakistan in the final, and they were given a ticker-tape parade in Mumbai upon their return home.

Something has been sparked inside of me, watching them carry on over the last few days. We have had a very successful side and I think watching how we celebrate and how they celebrate, I think we have been pretty humble in the way we have gone about it. And personally, I think they have got far too carried away with their celebrations. It has definitely sparked passion inside of us. It has certainly spiced it up as well. Something gets triggered inside of you, something is burning inside of you – it is your will for success or your animal instinct that wants to bring another team down, We have been at the top for so long, it is like someone has taken the favourite thing you own from you and you want it back.

— Andrew Symonds, Australian cricket player.

In an interview after second ODI at Kochi, Harbhajan criticized the Australian team as bad losers after their defeat to India in the semi-finals of the 2007 T20 World Cup, and referred to words that he had exchanged with them in the Kochi match.

They clearly did not like that [the Twenty20 loss to India]. They are a very good cricket side, but that does not mean that they can do whatever they want to do. They say they play the game in the right spirit, but they don't in reality. There is nothing gentlemanly about the way they play. I was responding to a lot of vulgar words that were said to me, I don't have any problem with chitchat on the field, so long as it is about the game. But when it is very personal and vulgar, that is not on. They think you cannot fight back and they do not like it when you do.

— Harbhajan Singh

During the Kochi match, the Indian paceman Sreesanth had several heated exchanges with Symonds when Australia were batting, and had to be pulled away from Symonds by teammates after dismissing him. However, Symonds's innings had already laid the platform for an eventual Australian victory.

The issue regarding Symonds became controversial and came to a climax during the final ODI at the Wankhede Stadium in Mumbai, where four men were arrested for taunting Symonds with monkey gestures and a large proportion of the crowd booed Symonds when he came out to bat. Symonds fell for a golden duck.

It was reported in the media that Harbhajan had called Symonds a "monkey" in India, but that no further action was taken after the matter was resolved privately with a promise that it would not be repeated.

Prior to this series, the two teams made a deal with the match referees to ensure good conduct. The nature of the deal has been contested by the two sides. The Australians insist that the deal stated that there would be no racism, including calling others monkeys, and Harbhajan was accused of breaking his promise to Symonds. The Indian officials believed that the deal also obligated the pair to additionally avoid exchanging words. According to Justice John Hansen who carried out the appeal for Harbhajan, the pact was broken by Symonds who swore at Harbhajan at the end of the 116th over.

=== Harbhajan banned ===
During the third day, the controversy restarted. At the end of the 116th over of India's first innings, Harbhajan was batting with Tendulkar in a vital partnership for India, who had just lost a series of quick wickets. Lee was the bowler in that over and Harbhajan had just edged him over the slips for four. Harbhajan then tapped Lee on the backside with his bat, apparently saying "hard luck", to which Lee did not react. Symonds says he needed to stand up for Lee so in his own words, he "had a bit of a crack at Harbhajan, telling him exactly what I thought of his antics". Symonds went on to claim that Harbhajan then "shot back" by calling him a monkey. Symonds stated in the appeal hearing that he believed that Test cricket was no place to be friendly to opposition players, so he spoke to Harbhajan. Under questioning he admitted that he had provoked the incident and used the word "fuck" among other language against Harbhajan, who stated that he then became "very angry" because of the use of this word.

Sachin Tendulkar, who was batting at the other end offered his inputs to the umpires, and in the ensuing hearing, and also writes in his autobiography, that he heard Symonds going after Harbhajan repeatedly in an aggressive verbal assault, even before the Brett Lee over, and after this particular incident. He said he heard Harbhajan use the north Indian swear phrase, "Teri ma ki", which translates to "your mother" in a very derogative meaning.

Neither umpire heard the comment.

Following the alleged exchange, commensurate with ICC protocol Ponting reported the incident to Benson and Bucknor, who later reported Harbhajan to the match referee Mike Procter on the charge of "Using language or gestures that offends, insults, humiliates, intimidates, threatens, disparages or vilifies another person on the basis of that person's race, religion, gender, colour, descent or national or ethnic origin." Kumble called Ponting at the end of the third day and asked him to not press charges against Harbhajan, wanting the issue not to leave the field. Kumble claimed "Having played cricket for this long, [I knew] such an allegation would definitely spiral into what it has now. I anticipated that".

Kumble said that he asked Harbhajan why he did it and received the reply "he hadn't, Symonds did and goaded", and insisted he made no racist comment. Kumble asked Ponting whether an apology from himself for the on-field altercation, as captain, would suffice (as Harbhajan was not willing to apologise) but, according to Kumble, Ponting was "not willing to listen". Kumble believed that the offer of an apology was interpreted by Ponting as an admission of guilt, although he explained to the Australian captain that no racist remarks were made.

The Australians have had a turbulent relationship with Harbhajan. In 1998, Harbhajan taunted Ponting when he dismissed him, resulting in the pair exchanging words directly in another's face, with both of them docked their match fees. In the historic 2000–01 tour of India, Harbhajan became the first Indian bowler to achieve a hat trick against Australia and also take two ten-wicket hauls against the Australians. Ponting made only 17 runs at 3.40 during the series, and was dismissed by Harbhajan on each of his five innings. During the 2007–08 particular tour, Harbhajan had claimed that he had the measure of Ponting, pointing to the fact that he has dismissed him six times in the last seven Tests. He claimed Ponting three times in the first four innings of the Australian tour.

The hearing for the incident was initially scheduled to be at the end of the fourth day's play, but it was postponed until after the match for fear that it would aggravate or distract the players. Mike Procter, who would be hearing the case, indicated that the umpires had not heard anything in relation to the allegations. On the evening after the end of day five, Procter, after listening to the testimony of Hayden, Symonds, Ponting and Gilchrist as well as that of Tendulkar and Harbhajan, declared that Harbhajan would be banned for three Test matches. Included in his final report were the words that "I believe one group is telling the truth", implying that Tendulkar and Harbhajan were lying in their testimonies, and that the Australian contingent were telling the truth

=== Tit for tat ===
Australian spinner Brad Hogg was later charged with the same offense as Harbhajan for calling Indian captain Anil Kumble and vice-captain Mahendra Singh Dhoni "bastards", a highly offensive term in India, after the BCCI lodged a complaint. The term was not on a blacklist submitted by the Indians to match officials before the series, in line with ICC protocol. Hogg claimed that he did not mean to insult the Indians with the term. The term "bastard" in India is taken literally as someone born out of wedlock; such people often become outcastes and are frowned upon.

The hearing for Hogg's case was to be held before Procter, and the preliminary date was set for 14 January. The charges were dropped after the two captains met for peace talks along with ICC match referee Ranjan Madugalle.

=== BCCI suspends tour; ICC mediates ===
After two test losses, the Indian team announced on 7 January 2008 that they were discontinuing the tour pending the outcome of the appeal against Harbhajan's three match ban. Rather than travelling on to Canberra, after spending several hours waiting on their tour bus, the Indian team disembarked and remained in Sydney. The Board of Control for Cricket in India issued a statement in which they "decided to challenge the unfair decision to suspend Harbhajan Singh", stating that the ban was "patently unfair". Tendulkar was reported to have messaged Pawar, saying "I suggest we should play in Perth only if the ban is lifted". Tendulkar denied advocating a boycott. However, they went back on the suspension and proceeded to Canberra for their next outing.

The racism allegation caused considerable backlash from within India. Many, including BCCI chairman Sharad Pawar have equated it to an attack on the country's people itself, based on the apparent misunderstanding that lead to such an escalation. Pawar told Cricinfo "allegations of racism against a member of our cricket team is not acceptable ... We fight against racism. Our country supported anti-racism movements in South Africa." Kumble considered the allegation one that should not have been made lightly as the team is meant to be an ambassador for the country and an allegation of racism becomes an issue of honour.

ICC chief executive Malcolm Speed announced that "a commissioner will be appointed by Wednesday to hear the appeal, which could take place before the third Test starts in Perth on 16 January." The ICC also announced that chief referee Ranjan Madugalle has been appointed to mediate between Ponting and Kumble to reduce tensions between the two teams. One result of these talks was the dropping of the charges against Hogg. Speed also asked Cricket Australia to talk to Ponting and other players. Speed was quoted as saying that:

The team is being criticised, members of the team are being criticised and they need to be aware of that – they need to respond to that.

Afterwards it was announced by the ICC that an appeal could not be heard before the Third Test, so Harbhajan was free to play until then, regardless of the appeal's result. The ICC also confirmed the New Zealand High Court judge John Hansen's appointment to oversee the appeal.

On 11 January, the BCCI president Sharad Pawar, clarified that the tour would not be canceled even if Harbhajan's appeal failed. On 14 January, the ICC chief executive Malcolm Speed announced that, the appeal would be heard on 29 and 30 January, after the fourth Test in Adelaide. He was quoted as saying that:

We would have preferred the appeal to be held earlier but it was not possible. Both CA and the BCCI have requested the hearing to be held after the Test series for logistical reasons and, following due consideration, Justice Hansen agreed. The reality is that it is likely to go into a second day as lawyers will be involved, so we needed to have two clear days to assign to it. With just three full days between the third and fourth Tests, we were conscious of the teams' travel arrangements and preparations for the match.

Harbhajan did not play in the third Test in Perth as India opted to field only one spinner, Kumble, on what was expected to be a pace-friendly surface, but India opted to recall him for the fourth Test in Adelaide while his appeal was still pending.

=== Bucknor removed ===
The BCCI called for the removal of Bucknor for the third Test in Perth, although they previously agreed not to interfere with the choice of umpire for any of the matches. On 8 January the ICC confirmed Bucknor would be dropped and replaced by New Zealand umpire Billy Bowden, despite previously stating there were no plans to stand him down.

=== Harbhajan acquitted ===
On 28 January, after the appeal hearing at Adelaide by ICC appeals commissioner Judge John Hansen, the racism charge on Harbhajan Singh was found to be "not proved". Harbhajan's three-Test ban was therefore lifted. However, the lesser charge (Level 2.8 offense) of using abusive language was applied and Harbhajan was fined 50% of his match fee.

Hansen ruled a lack of sufficient evidence. He was particularly perturbed by the fact the altercation stemmed from Symonds reacting angrily to Harbhajan patting Lee on the backside in recognition of a good delivery. Symonds' inability to conclusively say whether Harbhajan Singh had used the word monkey or a Hindi abuse, and his admission that the language did not fall under the requirements of a level 3.3 offence played a crucial part. Symonds was unable to state if he had heard Harbhajan use a term in his native tongue "teri maa ki" (an offensive Hindi term) which appears to be pronounced with an "n" and accepted that it was a possibility.

In a reversal from Procter's assertion, Hansen openly questioned the testimony of the other Australian players. He expressed surprise that the Australians claimed to have clearly heard the word "monkey" spoken by Harbhajan, but somehow couldn't make out any other words from either player.

It is not without significance that the Australian players maintain other than Mr Symonds that they did not hear any other words spoken, only the ones that are said to be of significance to this hearing. This is a little surprising in the context where there was a reasonably prolonged heated exchange. Indeed Mr Clarke went so far as to say that he did not hear Mr Symonds say anything. Given Mr Symonds' own acceptance that he initiated the exchange and was abusive towards Mr Singh, that is surprising. This failure to identify any other words could be because some of what they were hearing was not in English.

— John Hansen

In response to Symonds' comment that "a Test match is no place to be friendly with an opposition player", Hansen said

If that is his view I hope it is not one shared by all international cricketers.

— John Hansen

Unlike Mike Procter, who thought Tendulkar was not in a position to hear what was uttered, Hansen said "extensive video footage" establishes that Tendulkar "was within earshot and could have heard the words". According to Hansen, video replays from various camera angles showed that Tendulkar was the closest player to the conversation and was likely to have heard it. Tendulkar admitted words were spoken in both English and Hindi. Hansen also rejected the suggestion that the BCCI and Cricket Australia reached an agreement which he simply rubber-stamped.

It is incorrect to suggest that there was some sort of an agreement reached between Australian and Indian cricket authorities that I simply rubber-stamped, I also wish to add that while I was aware of the media furore surrounding this matter, no-one has attempted to apply direct pressure to obtain an outcome.

— John Hansen

He was also critical of all parties involved in the confrontation in Sydney, saying "their actions do not reflect well on them or the game".

== Reaction in India ==
Harsha Bhogle, an Indian commentator of the channel Star Cricket said during the commentary when the game ended:

Australia won! But did they deserve it?

During the Clarke's claimed catch and when Ponting held up his finger, the former Indian cricketer Sunil Gavaskar commented on air:

Why is Mr. Benson asking a person who didn't walk off when he was caught behind at 14, and it couldn't be possible that you are lying when you are batting and true while you are fielding. That is nonsense! Utter nonsense! I am sorry Mr. Benson, you got it all wrong.

Gavaskar strongly condemned Procter, accusing him of blatant racism for "taking the 'white man's' word against that of the 'brown man'" in handling the racism allegations and imposing the ban of three Tests on Harbhajan Singh. Gavaskar was also skeptical regarding the motivation of Australian team in reporting Harbhajan Singh, because he has dismissed Australian captain Ricky Ponting in three times in the current series. In his newspaper column to Hindustan Times, Gavaskar wrote:

Millions of Indians want to know if it was a 'white man' taking the 'white man's' word against that of the 'brown man'. Quite simply if there was no audio evidence nor did the officials hear anything then the charge did not stand. This is what has incensed the millions of Indians who are flabbergasted that the word of one of the greatest players in the history of the game, Sachin Tendulkar, was not accepted. In effect, Tendulkar has been branded a liar by the match referee. The off spinner has denied having used the word which has caused offence and in the absence of any audio recording and most crucially with both umpires not having heard it, the charge should have been dropped straight away for lack of corroborating evidence. By accepting the word of the Australian players and not the Indian players, the match referee has exposed himself to the charge of taking a decision based not on facts, but on emotion.

Madan Lal, another Indian former player, said Indian players felt umpiring in Australia had been biased against them in the past but was not expected in the era of neutral officials.

It always happened in the past in Australia, but now matches are televised, there are neutral umpires; it is sheer bad umpiring.

Indian officials further went on to claim that because "monkey" was not a derogatory word in India it was acceptable.

== Reaction in Australia ==
The Australian team were defended by Cricket Australia, former retired players and sections of the media, but were lambasted by much of the media as well as Australian athletes representing the country in other sports.

Cricket Australia chief executive James Sutherland defended the Australian players' behaviour, claiming that there had been a "marked improvement" in their on-field attitude and behaviour in recent years. Paul Marsh, the chief of the Australian Cricketers Association, which represents the country's first-class cricketers, believed the issues to be an instance of "tall poppy syndrome", claiming that the only reason Australia was being targeted by the media and opposition teams was that they had been dominating world cricket for too long. Later, in a Sydney Morning Herald article, Marsh pointed out that Australia was one of the four nominees to the ICC Spirit of Cricket awards, which occurred in September 2007. Marsh also pointed out that the Hogg incident was the first ICC Code of Conduct violation by the Australian team in 13 months. None of these comments, however approach directly the subject of Aussie sledging.

Steve Waugh writing for The Daily Telegraph in his article titled "Epic encounter's sour aftertaste" said:

It's a real pity this magnificent Test match will probably be remembered for all the wrong reasons – and not for the outstanding quality, pressure and the excruciating drama it ultimately provided.

He further said that the affair "now has the potential to affect relations between the countries". Waugh further offered to act as a mediator between the two sides.

The English journalist and former captain of Somerset County Cricket Club, Peter Roebuck, a columnist for The Sydney Morning Herald and The Age, branded Ponting as "arrogant" and insisted that he be stripped of the captaincy.

If Cricket Australia cares a fig for the tattered reputation of our national team in our national sport, it will not for a moment longer tolerate the sort of arrogant and abrasive conduct seen from the captain and his senior players ... Australia itself has been embarrassed. The notion that Ponting can hereafter take the Australian team to India is preposterous ... He has shown not the slightest interest in the well-being of the game, not the slightest sign of diplomatic skills, not a single mark of respect for his accomplished and widely admired opponents.

There was support for Ponting among some quarters of the media with The Australian's Malcolm Conn suggesting that he was being unfairly targeted.

Former player and now coach and commentator Geoff Lawson was scathing in his description of the team. Speaking to the Herald Sun, he said:

There's certainly been a lot of feeling from ex-players who think the baggy green has been disrespected. Some of these (current) players need to be spoken to. I just think a bit of counselling needs to be done with how these players perceive themselves. As an ex-Australian player I was pretty disappointed.

— Geoff Lawson, former Australian player

America's Cup-winning yachtsman John Bertrand, Olympic 1500 m gold medal-winning runner Herb Elliott and world champion marathon runner Robert de Castella, all members of the Sport Australia Hall of Fame, accused the Australian cricket team of turning sport into war and thereby damaging international relations and placing the country in a negative light. John Bertrand, the Hall of Fame chairman, went on to say that:

We believe Australia's Test team moral compass needs to be retuned and we want Cricket Australia to know that ... We believe the No.1 rule is to show respect for your fellow competitors and currently this does not appear to be the case ... Their desire to win at all costs is beginning to blur their moral compass and it would appear that is what happening to the Australian Test team ... The fallout that we are seeing at the moment is not acceptable. It's clearly damaging international relations and clearly a lot of people are upset.

Kevin Bartlett, former Australian rules football player, accused the Australian cricket team of bad sportsmanship towards its opponents by saying that:

You don't treat them with contempt, you treat them with respect – and I didn't see that from the Aussies

Glenn McGrath, a recently retired Australian cricketer who played alongside most of Ponting's men, commented upon the decision to stand down Steve Bucknor by saying:

I think it is sad and disappointing that it gets to the stage where you have a bad game and they are calling for your head.

The federal opposition leader in Australia Brendan Nelson defended Ponting and said:

It was great game that had all of the qualities, and strength of, any sporting match. Ricky Ponting has a really tough job as captain of the Australian cricket team, people should get off his back.

Neil Harvey, member of Don Bradman's Invincibles as well as the Australian Cricket Board Team of the Century and Australian Cricket Hall of Fame inductee, blamed Ponting, saying that:

Ponting should have kept his mouth shut and nothing would have happened ... It is quite unheard of for a captain to dob on someone like this and it is quite an unsportsmanlike act. I think Ponting should be chastised by Australian cricket officials for his actions.

Jeff Thomson, the former Australian fast bowler, harshly criticised the Australians by saying that:

The Aussies act like morons and bullies and they can't cop criticism from someone like myself. I think it was appalling that none of the Australians went over and shook Anil Kumble's hand at the end of the SCG Test. They just played up and carried on like idiots like they normally do.

On 10 January, following repetitive criticism of the Australian team, The Australian posted on their websites a video of the sixth ODI in the 2006 English tour of India, in which Harbhajan stands his ground after being clean bowled by Kevin Pietersen, having an exchange with the bowler including swearing to him, before leaving. On the same day, Channel Nine posted videos of the Harbhajan incident as well as an instance in which Dhoni dived to his right and claimed a catch which had bounced at the base of his glove. Channel Nine claimed there was "hypocrisy afoot" under a headline of "Holier-than-thou Indians are sinners too". In the same article it posted a 1981 video of Gavaskar ordering his partner Chetan Chauhan to leave the playing arena and stop the Test match after incorrectly being given out, in a bid to back up its argument.

== International reaction ==
(Cricket West Indies) Former West Indian captain and match referee Clive Lloyd commenting on Steve Bucknor being stood down for the next test match in a BBC Radio 5 Live interview said:

You wonder what confidence this gives umpires. What happens now if Billy Bowden makes a few mistakes?

(Pakistan) Former Pakistani captain fast bowler Wasim Akram lashed out against the "hypocritical" Australians for reporting Harbhajan, despite being known for their sledging and despite a rumoured pre-series agreement not to refer to Symonds, Australia's only dark skinned player, using the word "monkey" as Indian cricket fans had done in their recent home series. Akram further attacked them by calling them the "worst sledgers" in the world and labeling them as "cry babies":

We did not behave like cry babies and drag it to the officials ... They do it constantly and much more than anyone else, so how they can go out and complain about other teams, I don't know.

— Wasim Akram, former Pakistani cricket player

However, Rashid Latif, a former Pakistani cricketer who was accused of being a racist to Adam Gilchrist during the 2003 Cricket World Cup, noted that Harbhajan was renowned for having temper problems :

He has a short temper, he needs to control his emotions. He is a good guy, but he has some kind of problem with his temper. I think (Harbhajan) should have been given a warning on the field and if he does say something again, then give him a ban for two or three matches ... All of these things should stay on the field, it is better for the game.

— Rashid Latif, former Pakistani cricket player.

John Morrison, former New Zealand spin-bowler accused Australians of "running off to the teacher", while his former teammate Dipak Patel, of Indian descent, said that he had been called "a lot worse than a monkey".

(England) Christopher Martin-Jenkins, chief cricket correspondent for The Times in the United Kingdom defended the "righteous indignation of India's players" and suggested that the BCCI's adamance to give the issue the necessary publicity has been better for the game. Martin-Jenkins also described Australia as the "nonpareils of world sledging" and expressed the view that Michael Clarke would be less appropriate as a future captain than Mike Hussey based on Clarke's decision to stand his ground after being caught at first slip.

Former England cricketer and current Channel Nine commentator Tony Greig, whose comments on air were criticised by Ricky Ponting stood by his observations saying:

I stand by what I said about the declaration. If the umpires had got it right (and Rahul Dravid had not been incorrectly given out caught behind) Ricky would have been found out on the declaration.

Going on to comment on other issues of the game including umpiring and the ethics of walking, he said:

Ponting got an edge down the leg-side and was out (but didn't walk). Then he got a bad decision for an lbw and carried on about it. There are double standards. At the same time Ponting is trying to persuade opposition captains to take his word on catches ... they are all over the place. All I can tell you is the best umpiring I have ever experienced and the best relationships between umpires and players was in England in county cricket where we had former first-class players like Mark Benson umpiring. You were considered to be a cheat if you didn't walk.

English journalist Simon Barnes writing for The Australian believed it was too late to draw a racism line in the sand. Barnes alleged that sledging is as much part of cricket as kicking in the shins is as part of rugby. According to Barnes "Australia has long promoted mental disintegration; as a result, we are facing the disintegration of the game of cricket."

The Asian teams come from a culture in which politeness is a more respected thing than it is in Australia or England, but many Asian cricketers have thought it appropriate to fight back in kind. Continuing escalation is inevitable. If I called you an idiot, again and again and again, you would eventually call me a bloody fool. What would you think if I then staggered back in horror. "He called me a fool! He said bloody! This mustn't be allowed!" That is what has happened. Australia led the way in insults and now, claiming that an India player used a racist term, it is saying that rude behaviour on a cricket pitch is terrible, rotten, awful, mustn't be allowed.

— Simon Barnes – The Australian

Oliver Brett of BBC Sport was sympathetic towards the Indians. Brett claimed that Ponting's word should not have been taken as fact by Procter as Ponting had claimed a catch that was "obviously grassed" and had raised his finger to Benson to indicate certainty that a dubious catch had been taken.

The English journalist and former captain of Somerset County Cricket Club, Peter Roebuck, a columnist for The Sydney Morning Herald and The Age, branded Ponting as "arrogant" and insisted that he be stripped of the captaincy.

If Cricket Australia cares a fig for the tattered reputation of our national team in our national sport, it will not for a moment longer tolerate the sort of arrogant and abrasive conduct seen from the captain and his senior players ... Australia itself has been embarrassed. The notion that Ponting can hereafter take the Australian team to India is preposterous ... He has shown not the slightest interest in the well-being of the game, not the slightest sign of diplomatic skills, not a single mark of respect for his accomplished and widely admired opponents.

== Aftermath ==
The issue was a highly volatile subject in media in both Australia and India. After the meeting of the captains prior to the third Test the teams appeared to be in better spirits, although some media outlets suggested the Australians had been trying to alter the way they play in response to the criticism and to fit in with the vague definition of the 'spirit of the game'. India won the next Test in Perth by a fair margin and drew the fourth match in Adelaide, giving Australia a 2–1 victory in the series. In the context of the series result, the Sydney Test ended up being pivotal. Steve Bucknor never again stood as an umpire in matches involving India and announced his retirement the next year. The Umpire Decision Review System for referring the on-field umpire's decision to a TV umpire gained momentum, although India did not formally adopt it for Test cricket until 2016.

However, twelve years after the match in 2020, in a podcast on Sky Cricket, Ricky Ponting admitted that India got the "raw end of umpiring decisions" and acknowledged that some key umpiring decisions went against India in the match.

In July 2020, Steve Bucknor, who was one of the field umpires in the match, said that he made two mistakes which cost India the match. In response, Irfan Pathan said, “As a cricketer, we’re used to getting bad decisions, sometimes in our bowling, sometimes in our batting. And we get frustrated by that and then we forget about it. But this Sydney Test match, it was not just one mistake. There were about seven mistakes that cost us the game. There were mistakes where Andrew Symonds was playing, and he got out nearly, I remember, three times, and the umpire didn’t give him out.”

== See also ==
- Second Test, 2000–01 Border–Gavaskar Trophy
- Fourth Test, 2022–23 Border–Gavaskar Trophy
- 2023 ICC World Test Championship final
- 2003 Cricket World Cup final
- 2023 Cricket World Cup final
