= John Hansen (judge) =

New Zealand judge and cricketer

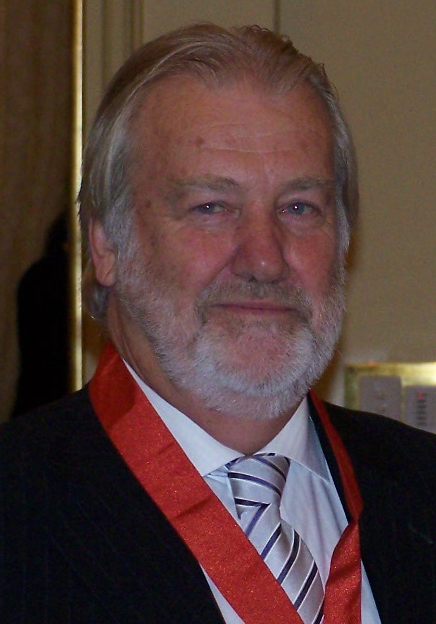
Hansen in 2008

Sir John William Hansen KNZM (born 1945) is a retired judge of the New Zealand High Court and a member of the International Cricket Council Code of Conduct Commission. He has held several judicial offices from 1979 until 1988 in Hong Kong and since 1988, in the High Court of New Zealand. He was a professional cricket player and later took on administrative jobs at International Cricket Council. Since 2019, Hansen has been the chairperson of the Canterbury District Health Board.

== Career ==
Hansen started his education at Wakari School in Dunedin. He graduated with a Bachelor of Laws in 1968 from the University of Otago, New Zealand. In 1967, he had joined the law firm of Aspinall, Joel & Co and then moved to John E Farry. In 1969, he became a partner of the firm, which is now called as John E. Farry & Hansen. During the years between 1979 and 1988, Hansen was based in Hong Kong appointed as a magistrate, coroner, district court judge, family court judge and High Court master. In 1988, he returned to New Zealand and became a master of the New Zealand High Court. He was later appointed as a judge of the High Court in July 1995. He retired in 2008. In latter years he had been performing his duties at Christchurch High Court. In the 2008 Queen's Birthday Honours, Hansen was appointed a Distinguished Companion of the New Zealand Order of Merit, for services to the judiciary. In 2009, following the restoration of titular honours by the New Zealand government, he accepted redesignation as a Knight Companion of the New Zealand Order of Merit.

In March 2009, Hansen was appointed to Court of Appeal of the Solomon Islands and in April 2009 he was appointed to the Court of Appeals of Samoa.

In December 2019, Hansen was appointed by the Minister of Health as chairperson of the Canterbury District Health Board.

== Cricket ==
Hansen has played senior club cricket in Dunedin, New Zealand till 1979. In 1979, he moved to Hong Kong where he became the captain of Kowloon Cricket Club. He was also the manager of the Hong Kong national team in the 1980s. In 1988 he moved back to New Zealand, and is currently the president of Willows Cricket Club, North Canterbury. Hansen is also a member of International Cricket Council Code of Conduct Commission representing New Zealand.

As a member of this commission, Hansen's responsibilities include overseeing formal enquiries into conduct, which in the opinion of the Executive Board is prejudicial to the interests of the game of cricket. He will then make recommendations to the Executive Board on these matters.

== Hearing of BCCI appeal ==
Indian spinner Harbhajan Singh was charged with a Level 3 offence of racially abusing Australian cricketer Andrew Symonds during the second Test of 2007–08 Border-Gavaskar Trophy, in Sydney Cricket Ground. At the completion of the test match, the match referee Mike Procter conducted the hearing with involved players and upheld the charges, issuing a ban of three Test matches to Harbhajan Singh. The BCCI filed an appeal against the decision on behalf of Harbhajan.

Hansen was appointed to hear the appeal, on 8 January 2008 and the hearing was scheduled for 29 and 30 January.

On 29 January 2008, the hearing on the appeal was conducted by Hansen. The racism charge on Harbhajan Singh was not proved and therefore cleared and three Test ban imposed on him by match referee Mike Procter was lifted. However, lesser charge (Level 2.8 offence) of using abusive language was applied and Harbhajan was fined 50% of his match fee. Also it was reported that senior players had written a letter to the justice requesting a downgrading of the charge. Captains and Cricket Boards (BCCI and CA) of both the countries expressed their satisfaction with the outcome of the hearing.
