= Andrew Symonds =

Australian cricketer (1975–2022)

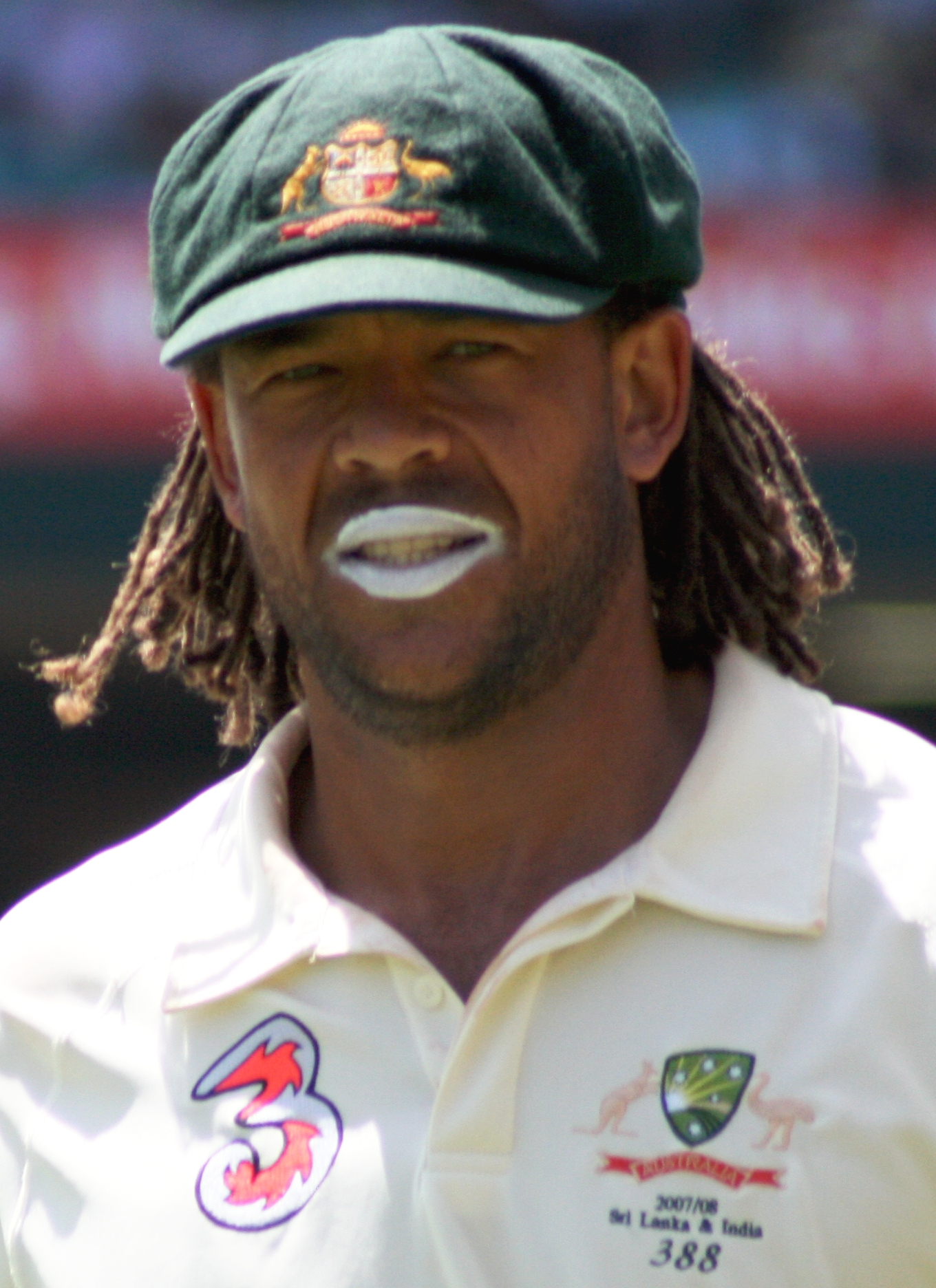
- Symonds in 2008, sporting his trademark zinc oxide sunscreen on his lips

Personal information
- Born: 9 June 1975; Birmingham, West Midlands, England
- Died: 14 May 2022 (aged 46); Hervey Range, Queensland, Australia
- Height: 187 cm (6 ft 2 in)
- Batting: Right-handed
- Bowling: Right-arm medium; Right-arm off break
- Role: All-rounder

International information
- National side: Australia (1998–2009)
- Test debut (cap 388): 8 March 2004 v Sri Lanka
- Last Test: 26 December 2008 v South Africa
- ODI debut (cap 139): 10 November 1998 v Pakistan
- Last ODI: 3 May 2009 v Pakistan
- T20I debut (cap 11): 17 February 2005 v New Zealand
- Last T20I: 7 May 2009 v Pakistan

Domestic team information
- Years: Team
- 1993/94–2009/10: Queensland
- 1995–1996: Gloucestershire
- 1999–2004: Kent
- 2005: Lancashire
- 2008–2010: Deccan Chargers
- 2010: Surrey
- 2011: Mumbai Indians

Career statistics
Competition	Test	ODI	FC	LA
Matches	26	198	227	424
Runs scored	1,462	5,088	14,477	11,099
Batting average	40.61	39.75	42.20	34.04
100s/50s	2/10	6/30	40/65	9/64
Top score	162*	156	254*	156
Balls bowled	2,094	5,935	17,633	11,713
Wickets	24	133	242	282
Bowling average	37.33	37.25	36.00	33.25
5 wickets in innings	0	1	2	4
10 wickets in match	0	0	0	0
Best bowling	3/50	5/18	6/105	6/14
Catches/stumpings	22/–	82/–	159/–	187/–
Medal record
Men's Cricket
Representing Australia
ICC Cricket World Cup
Winner	2003 South Africa-Zimbabwe-Kenya
Winner	2007 West Indies
- Source: ESPNcricinfo, 15 May 2022

Andrew Symonds (9 June 1975 – 14 May 2022) was an Australian international cricketer, who played all three formats as a batting all-rounder. Commonly nicknamed "Roy", he was a key member of two World Cup–winning squads. Symonds was a part of the team that won both the 2003 Cricket World Cup and, four years later, the 2007 Cricket World Cup. Symonds played as a right-handed, middle-order batsman and alternated between medium pace and off-spin bowling. He was also notable for his exceptional fielding skills.

After mid-2008, Symonds spent significant time out of the team due to disciplinary reasons, including alcohol abuse. In June 2009, he was sent home from the 2009 World Twenty20, his third suspension, expulsion or exclusion from selection in the space of a year. His central contract was then withdrawn, and many cricket analysts speculated that the Australian administrators would no longer tolerate him and that Symonds might announce his retirement. Symonds eventually retired from all forms of professional cricket in February 2012, to concentrate on his family life.

In 2022, Symonds died in a single-vehicle car crash at Hervey Range, outside Townsville, Queensland. He was 46.

== Early life ==
One of Symonds' birth parents was of an Afro-Caribbean background, while the other was believed to be of Scandinavian descent. Symonds was adopted by parents Ken and Barbara at three months of age, and they moved to Australia when he was a toddler. He had three siblings. His sister, Louise Symonds, who was also adopted, was a contestant on the Australian Gladiators television series in 2008. He spent the early part of his childhood in Charters Towers, northern Queensland, where his father taught at the private All Souls St Gabriels School, which Symonds attended. He showed sporting prowess from a very early age. "Dad was cricket mad," Symonds said. "He'd throw balls to me five or six days a week, before school, after school. And we'd play all sorts of games inside the house with ping-pong balls and Christmas decorations." His early junior cricket was played in Townsville for the Wanderers club, with the father-and-son duo making the 270-kilometre return trip sometimes twice a week. In 1988, Symonds' father accepted a deputy headmaster role at All Saints Anglican School, and the family subsequently relocated to the Gold Coast when Symonds was 12 years of age. He attended the school and continued his junior cricket at Palm Beach Currumbin. A few years later, Symonds made his Queensland Premier Cricket debut for the Gold Coast Dolphins as a 15-year-old and hit a remarkable double century in his first game.

== Overview of cricket career ==
Symonds was an aggressive right-handed batsman who could also bowl off spin or medium pace, making him a solid all-rounder. He was an exceptional fielder, with a report prepared by ESPNcricinfo in late 2005 showing that since the 1999 Cricket World Cup, he had effected the equal-fifth-most run-outs in One Day International (ODI) cricket of any fieldsman, with the fourth-highest success rate, with Ricky Ponting rating him the best fielder he had seen, and a better and more versatile one than Herschelle Gibbs and Jonty Rhodes because Symonds was taller than them, giving him better defensive coverage range and had greater throw power outside the circle. He was very agile for his size and weight (medium-heavy build; 187 cm tall), had excellent reflexes, was able to take catches well and had a powerful and accurate throwing arm. His nickname was Roy, shortened from the name Leroy, after a coach from early in his career believed he resembled local Brisbane basketball player Leroy Loggins. He was an AIS Australian Cricket Academy scholarship holder in 1994. In 1995, after playing in his first season for English county Gloucestershire, Symonds won the Cricket Writer's Club Young Cricketer of the Year award. Shortly afterwards, Symonds was selected as part of the England A team that was to tour Pakistan in the winter; however, he decided not to go, instead choosing to pursue an international career for Australia. His place on the tour was later taken by Middlesex player Jason Pooley.

== Domestic cricket ==
=== Australian state cricket ===
Symonds scored more than 5,000 runs and took more than 100 wickets for the Queensland state team. He scored 113 and took four wickets in a losing cause in the final of the 1998–99 Sheffield Shield season, and was named man of the match in the 2002 Pura Cup final after scoring 123 runs and taking six wickets.

=== English counties ===
Symonds played for four English counties during his career—Gloucestershire, Kent, Lancashire and Surrey. His first appearance for an English county was with Gloucestershire. Initially, he was considered an England-qualified player; however, following his first season of county cricket in 1995, he declared that his allegiances lay with Australia when he chose not to tour Pakistan with the England A team.

In August 1995, he hit a record 16 sixes in his unbeaten 254 against Glamorgan at Abergavenny. In doing so, he beat the previous mark set by New Zealand's John R. Reid. Wisden reported that the 16th six "landed on a tennis court about 20 feet (6.1 m) over the boundary" and "though he was undoubtedly helped by the short boundaries, it would have been a hugely effective innings on any ground in the world". The record was equalled by Graham Napier for Essex against Surrey in 2011, and stood until May 2022 when Ben Stokes hit 17 sixes in an innings for Durham against Worcestershire. Symonds added four more sixes in the second innings, to beat the old record of 17 in a match, set by Warwickshire's Jim Stewart against Lancashire at Blackpool in 1959.

In July 2005, he signed for Lancashire for the rest of the English season having finished duties as part of Australia's ODI squad. In April 2010, he signed for Surrey to play in the Friends Provident t20 competition.

==== Kent ====
Between 1999 and 2004, Symonds played for Kent. He joined the club as an overseas player for the first time ahead of the 1999 County Championship and was also brought in as an injury replacement for Daryll Cullinan during the 2001 County Championship.

He eventually made his mark in T20 cricket which was in its early days during his stint with Kent. He also featured for Kent in the inaugural edition of the 2003 Twenty20 Cup and played an influential knock of an unbeaten 96 runs off just 37 balls with a strike rate of 259.45 against Hampshire in a group stage match. His knock which came at a strike rate of over 250 was a surprise given that T20 cricket was in its very early days. His knock sealed the deal for Kent as the modest target of 146 was reached within just 12 overs.

Some of his highlights came on 2 July 2004 when he hit a 43-ball 112 for Kent Spitfires in a Twenty20 Cup match against Middlesex Crusaders. He scored 112 in 37 minutes and his century, which came at 34 balls, was the then world record for the fastest ever century in T20 cricket. His record stood for nine years before being surpassed by Chris Gayle, during the 2013 Indian Premier League, who did it in 30 balls. Symonds' knock comprised a flurry of boundaries including 18 fours and three sixes which came at a strike rate of 260.46 and his knock helped Kent to win the rain-affected match convincingly by seven wickets with 29 balls to spare.

He appeared in 49 first-class matches for Kent, scoring 3,526 runs for the club at an average of 45.20, including 12 centuries, and also taking 65 wickets. He also played in 62 List A matches for Kent, scoring 1,690 runs at an average of 30.17, and took 69 wickets at an average of 21.53. In 2020, Kent supporters named him as the club's Greatest Overseas Player in the white ball format.

=== Indian Premier League ===
In February 2008, Symonds was signed by the Indian Premier League (IPL) franchise Deccan Chargers for US$1,350,000, which made him the second-most-expensive player in the league at that time. During the 2008 competition, Symonds scored 117 not out from 53 balls against Rajasthan Royals. The Royals ended up winning the game, with Symonds conceding 19 runs from the final over, with 17 required to win. Symonds started the third season convincingly, scoring two 50s in his first three games with the team in 2010. The following year he was contracted by Mumbai Indians for US$850,000.

== International career ==
=== Emergence and 2003 World Cup ===
Although Symonds was originally qualified to play for England due to its being the country of his birth, and West Indies due to his ancestry, in 1995 he decided that he wished to pursue an international career for Australia instead. His international debut came on 10 November 1998, when he played in a One Day International (ODI) for Australia against Pakistan at Lahore. As an ODI player, he was known for scoring runs at an excellent strike rate of over 90, with a highest score of 156.

However, at the start of his international career, Symonds struggled to make an impact with the bat and ball, although his fielding was of high quality, and was not a regular member of the playing XI. Symonds was named in Australia's 2003 Cricket World Cup squad. After all-rounder Shane Watson had to withdraw due to injury, Shane Warne was sent home after failing a drugs test, and with Darren Lehmann still serving a suspension for racial abuse, Symonds made his way into the starting XI. According to former England cricketer Adam Hollioake, Symonds would not have made the 2003 World Cup squad if he had not received backing from captain Ponting.

In the first match against Pakistan, Symonds scored 143 not out to guide Australia from 4/86 to 8/310 en route to an 82-run victory, a performance described by Kanta Murali of The Hindu as "one of the best knocks in one-day cricket history". The innings went on to become the turning point of his career. In the semi-final against Sri Lanka, Symonds top scored with 91 not out and was named Player of the Match, as Australia won by 48 runs. With Australia's defeat of India in the final, they claimed their third World Cup triumph, becoming the first team to go undefeated in an edition of the tournament. Following this breakthrough, The Age described Symonds "as a true one-day star", who had "become an essential part of the one-day team."

He batted in five innings during the victorious 2003 World Cup campaign where he made 326 runs at an average of 163. He was also the third leading runscorer for Australia during the World Cup campaign just behind Adam Gilchrist and Matthew Hayden. He remained unbeaten in three of the five innings and his only failure with the bat in the tournament was against England where he was dismissed for a duck.

=== ODI regular, Test debut ===
A tour of the West Indies followed, with Symonds playing all seven ODIs, scoring half-centuries in the third and fifth matches. He ended as Australia's top run scorer in a 4–3 series victory.

In March 2004, Symonds made his Test debut in Australia's tour of Sri Lanka, with the selectors citing his bowling and his power hitting against spin bowlers as "ideal" for the subcontinent conditions. He replaced Simon Katich, who had scored a century and unbeaten fifty in Australia's previous Test. Playing as a batsman, Symonds encountered difficulty against Muttiah Muralitharan on the dusty, spinning Sri Lankan tracks, failing to pass 25 in any of his four innings, and was dropped after two Test matches in favour of Katich.

He was recalled in November 2005 for South Africa's tour of Australia, following an injury to Shane Watson, as Australia's search for an all-rounder continued. After five Tests, with a batting average of 12.62 and a bowling average of 85.00, he was under pressure to retain his place in the team going into the 2005 Boxing Day Test. On the first day of the match, he was out caught behind for a golden duck. But Symonds then took 3/50 in the South African first innings, before hitting 72 off 54 balls in the second innings and taking 2/6 with the ball. For his performances in 2005, he was named in the World ODI XI by the ICC.

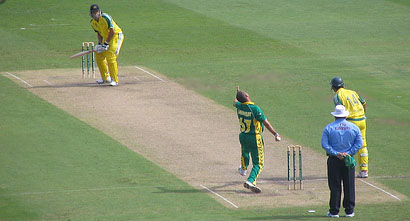
Symonds batting against South Africa in 2006

At the 2006 Allan Border Medal count, Symonds would have won the One Day Player of the Year award as he polled the most votes, but was ineligible due to having been suspended because of a drinking binge during the 2005 Ashes tour.

Symonds played every ODI in the tri-nation 2005–06 VB Series. He was named Player of the Match twice in the group stage: once as he hit a half-century in the opening game, and then again after scoring 32 and taking three wickets, both in victories over Sri Lanka. He also scored a second half-century, reaching 65 in a win over South Africa.

Having won six of their eight group stage games, Australia qualified for the best-of-three final, once again facing Sri Lanka, who finished second in the group table. After going down 1–0 in the opening match, Symonds put up 151, including 13 fours and three sixes. He shared a big partnership with Ricky Ponting as Australia recorded 5/368, setting their highest ever ODI score. Symonds was named Player of the Match once again. After Australia secured victory in the third game of the final, Symonds won Player of the Series honours, having scored 389 runs and recorded 11 wickets. For his performances in 2006, he was named as 12th man in the World ODI XI by the ICC.

After South Africa's tour of Australia, the teams both headed to South Africa in February 2006 for another series there. Symonds missed the first three ODIs through injury, but returned in the fourth with a score of 76, to help Australia chase down a score of 246, and tie the series at 2–2. In the fifth and final ODI, Symonds contributed 27* as Australia broke the world record score for an ODI, with 434. But in what was billed "The greatest the world has seen" by The Sydney Morning Herald, South Africa successfully chased and broke the new world record, setting a new high of 438, with 1 wicket and 1 ball to spare.

While batting in the second Test of the tour, Symonds was struck in the face of his helmet by a bouncer off Makhaya Ntini. Symonds required four stitches on the inside of his upper lip. After scoring just 101 runs and claiming one wicket in the three Test series, Symonds found himself dropped from the Test team for the subsequent tour of Bangladesh, with Michael Clarke taking his place.

=== 2007 World Cup ===
Following the retirement of Damien Martyn during the 2006–07 Ashes, Symonds was again recalled to the team. Although he scored just 26 and 2 in his first Test back, he retained his place in the team for the second match. In the Boxing Day Test, Symonds arrived at the crease with Australia at 5/84. After a slow start to his innings he proceeded to score his maiden Test century, combining with Matthew Hayden to put on a 279 run partnership and bringing up the century with a six. Symonds was finally dismissed for 156.

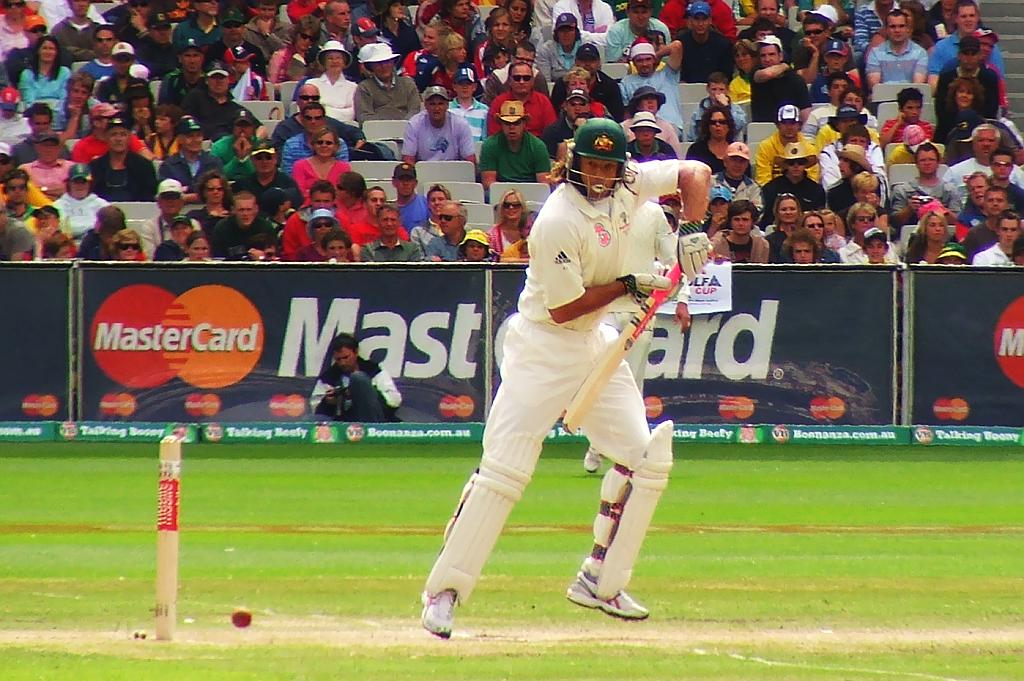
Symonds on the way to his maiden Test hundred in 2006

Although selected in Australia's 15-member World Cup squad he was unavailable for selection for the first few matches because he ruptured his biceps while batting against England on 2 February 2007 in the Commonwealth Bank Tri Series. Surgery was performed and Symonds underwent extensive physical rehabilitation. As a result, he missed the remainder of that tournament as well as the Chappell–Hadlee Trophy in New Zealand, while Australia suffered their longest losing streak in over a decade.

Symonds remarkably made a relatively quick recovery after returning for Australia's win in their last preliminary World Cup match against South Africa. Australia reached the final, where they faced Sri Lanka. In a rain-affected game, shortened to 38/36 overs per side, Symonds scored 23 not out during Australia's innings, and bowled the final ball of the tournament to seal victory in a contest that concluded in near-total darkness.

=== Allegations of racial taunts ===
In 2007, crowds at the One Day Series in Vadodara, Nagpur and Mumbai were seen to offend Symonds with monkey chants. After the Board of Control for Cricket in India (BCCI) initially denied the incident at Vadodara took place (claiming it was a confusion with worshipping Hanuman the monkey god), further incidents occurred at the other grounds in the series.

During the subsequent Sri Lankan tour of Australia in late 2007, Symonds had good form with the bat but suffered an ankle injury, which ruled him out for the remainder of the Test series. He then returned for 2007–08 Australia–India series.

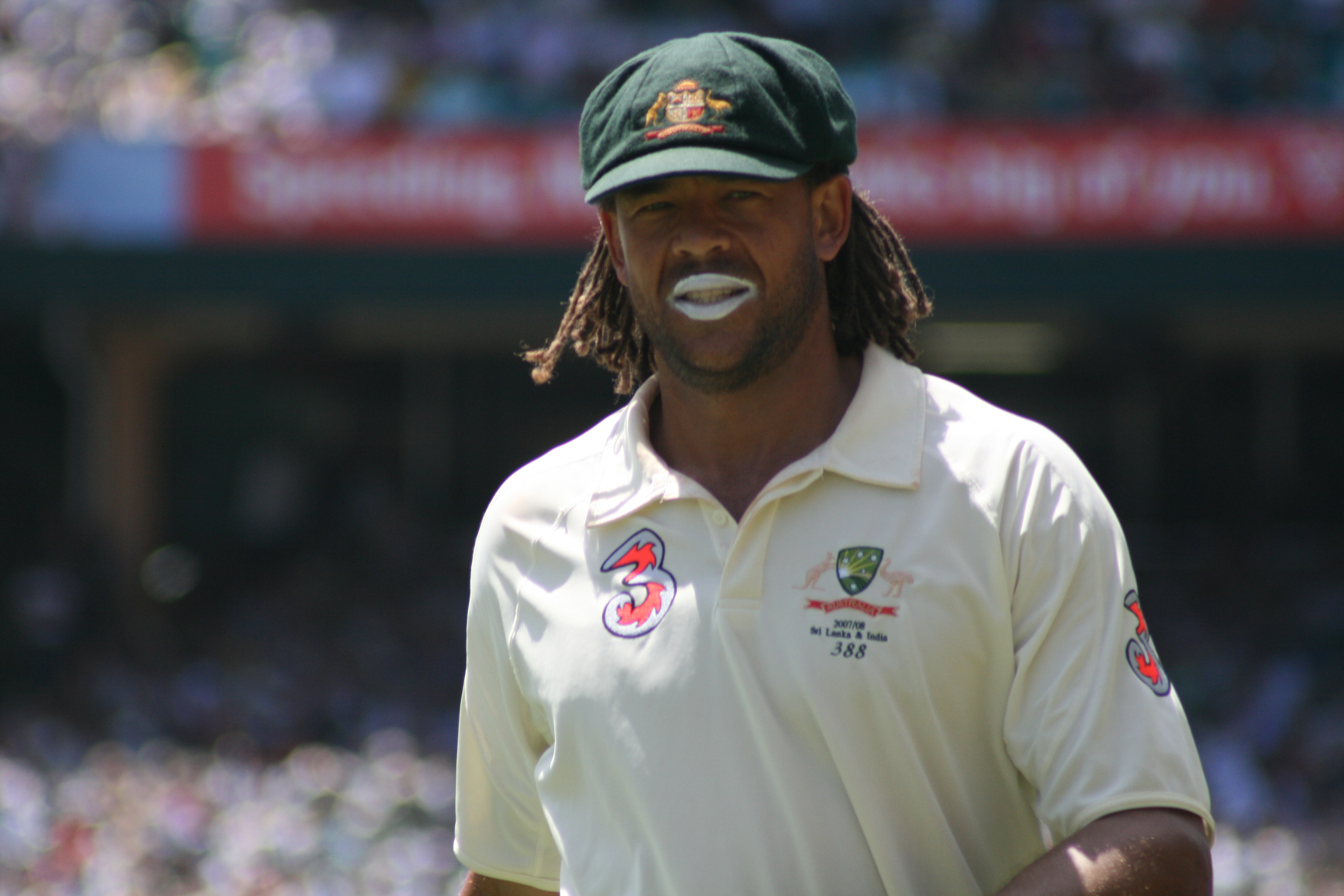
Symonds playing for Australia against India in 2008

During the second Test against India on 2 January 2008, Symonds completed his second Test century. He came to the crease with Australia struggling at 119/4. After his initial partners, Michael Clarke (1) and then Adam Gilchrist (7), were dismissed in quick succession, Australia found themselves in dire shape at 134/6. Symonds and Brad Hogg then put on a record 7th wicket partnership at the Sydney Cricket Ground (also a record for Australia vs. India) of 173 until Hogg was dismissed for 79. At stumps on the first day, Symonds was not out on 137, and Australia 376/7. By the end of the innings, Symonds finished on 162 not out, when the Australians were finally bowled out for 463. He further went on to score 62 not out in the second innings. In January 2008, Indian spin bowler Harbhajan Singh received a three-match ban after a complaint that he had racially abused Symonds during the third day of the Second Test at the SCG. It was alleged that Harbhajan called Symonds a "monkey" after Symonds confronted him over touching fellow Australian player Brett Lee. The case was decided by the match referee, Mike Procter, in a hearing held after the match.

On 29 January 2008, after the hearing of the appeal, at Adelaide by ICC appeals commissioner John Hansen, the racism charge on Harbhajan Singh was not proved and the three Test ban was lifted. However, a lesser charge (Level 2.8 offence) of using abusive language was applied and Harbhajan was fined 50% of his match fee. Hansen later admitted that he "could have imposed a more serious penalty if he was made aware by the ICC of the bowler's previous transgressions"—including a suspended one Test Match ban. The ICC claimed the "database and human errors ... played a part in Harbhajan Singh escaping a more severe penalty during his appeal hearing in Adelaide". Hansen also criticised Symonds in his report accusing him of swearing at Harbhajan after a friendly gesture by the Indian bowler towards Brett Lee. It was also reported that senior players had written a letter to John Hansen requesting a downgrading of the charge. The letter was signed by Sachin Tendulkar and Ricky Ponting and counter-signed by Michael Clarke, Matthew Hayden and Symonds. The stump microphone audio was removed immediately after the alleged incident between Harbhajan Singh and Andrew Symonds was released by Channel Nine.

In his 2013 autobiography At the Close of Play, Ricky Ponting expressed his disillusionment with Cricket Australia for failing to support Symonds, who, though the victim of abuse, was painted as a villain. Daniel Brettig notes how, "duly disillusioned", Symonds "drifted from the game via a series of disciplinary problems".

=== International career draws to a close ===
During the second final of the 2007–08 Commonwealth Bank Series against India on 4 March 2008, Symonds shoulder charged a male streaker who had entered the playing arena. Symonds, who had once considered a career in rugby league with the Brisbane Broncos, may have faced assault charges had the man taken legal action.

Symonds was set to play for Australia in the August 2008 series against Bangladesh in Darwin, but was sent home to Queensland after missing a team meeting while out fishing. Stand-in captain Michael Clarke told the media that Symonds would have to re-evaluate his desire to represent Australia: "The main concern from us is Andrew's commitment, to playing for this team and, in my opinion and I know the rest of the leadership team's opinion, you need to be committed 100 per cent." As a further punishment for his misadventure, Symonds was not selected for the Australian tour of India in October 2008.

After Australia lost the test series in India 2–0, Symonds was recalled for the Test series against New Zealand in November 2008. He did not play any significant role in the first Test, which Australia won. After the Test, on 22 November, Symonds was reported to have been involved in a pub brawl with another patron who had attempted to hug him and have his photo taken with the cricketer. He was subsequently cleared by Cricket Australia to play in the second test. He then played in the first two tests of the next series against South Africa but performed poorly and was omitted from the team for the third test due to injury; at the same time, many critics called for his omission on performance grounds. Nonetheless, for his performances in 2008, he was named in the World ODI XI by the ICC.

In January 2009, Symonds gave an interview with sports comedians Roy & HG, in which he made remarks about the acquisition of New Zealand cricketer Brendon McCullum by the New South Wales Blues to play in the KFC Twenty20 final against Victoria despite McCullum's not having played at all for the Blues previously. Sounding intoxicated, Symonds called McCullum a "lump of shit" declaring that having dinner at the home of teammate Matthew Hayden was enjoyable because he could glance at Hayden's wife. The interview led to his being charged with violating the Cricket Australia code of conduct. Following a hearing with general manager Michael Brown, he was fined $4,000, instructed to work with a psychologist, and indefinitely barred from selection until he was deemed to have been successfully rehabilitated.

In the meantime Symonds continued to play for Queensland, but was not selected by Australia, missing three five-match series against South Africa, New Zealand and South Africa respectively. He was finally recalled in April to play ODIs against Pakistan in the United Arab Emirates, but was not selected for the 2009 Ashes series, with young all-rounders Shane Watson, Andrew McDonald and Marcus North being preferred.

In early June 2009, Symonds was sent home from the ICC World Twenty20 tournament in England following "an alcohol-related incident". Cricket Australia chief executive James Sutherland called a press conference to announce Symonds' dismissal, which marked the end of his international cricket career. His Cricket Australia contract was also reviewed and later cancelled.

In June 2009, Symonds told Channel Nine's Sixty Minutes that he was not an alcoholic but a binge-drinker. "I go out and drink hard all in one hit – too fast, too much", he said.

== Career highlights ==
Tests

Debut: Against Sri Lanka at Galle, 2003–04

- Best Test bowling figures: 3/50 (vs South Africa, Melbourne, MCG, 2005–06).
- Best Test batting score: 162 not out (India, Sydney, SCG, 3 January 2008).

One Day Internationals

Debut: Against Pakistan, Lahore, 1998–99

- Best ODI bowling figures: 5/18 (Bangladesh, Manchester, Old Trafford, 2005)
- Best ODI batting score: 156 (New Zealand, Wellington, Westpac Stadium, 7 December 2005)

Records and achievements

Symonds previously held the world records for the most sixes hit during a first-class innings (16) and during a first-class match (20), both set while playing for Gloucestershire against Glamorgan as a 20-year-old. His first innings score was 254 not out.

At the time of his death, Symonds was one of only 22 players to have scored over 5,000 runs and taken more than 100 wickets in ODI cricket and one of only three Australians to have done so. His batting average of 100 runs per inning in World Cup matches was also the highest of any player in that competition.

In 2007, he was named as an all-rounder in Australia's all-time "greatest ODI team".

== Rugby league ==
Symonds was a keen supporter of the Brisbane Broncos since childhood and was considering a switch to rugby league in 2002 when his cricket career was faltering. On 21 June 2009, he played a game for the Wynnum Manly Seagulls against an all-star team featuring some noted players, including Marcus Bai and Steve Renouf. He also trained with the Brisbane Broncos.

== Media ==
Symonds made a cameo in the 2011 Bollywood movie Patiala House. In 2011, he was a guest contestant on the Indian reality series Bigg Boss. Pooja Mishra, who had already been eliminated from the show, returned to act as a translator for Symonds.

Symonds worked as a guest commentator for Big Bash matches between the 2016–17 and 2018–19 seasons.

== Death ==
Symonds was killed in a single-vehicle road accident at Hervey Range, outside of Townsville, Queensland, on 14 May 2022, at the age of 46. Queensland Police said in a statement that Symonds was driving on Hervey Range Road near the Alice River Bridge when his car left the road and rolled at around 10:30 pm local time. Symonds was the only occupant of the car. Paramedics responded and attempted to revive him, but Symonds was pronounced dead at the scene.

A minute's silence was observed at the start of the final day of the match between two of Symonds' former English clubs, Kent and Surrey, which was taking place when he died. A silence was also observed before the start of the first day's play of the first Test between Sri Lanka and Bangladesh in Chattogram.

A tribute campaign, called "Fishing Rods for Roy", was launched in memory of Symonds, referring to his interest in fishing. Cricket fans throughout Australia were encouraged to leave fishing rods and cricket balls outside the front of their houses as a nationwide tribute, one which mirrored the tributes after the death of Phillip Hughes in 2014.

== Bibliography ==
=== Author ===
- Symonds, Andrew; Gray, Stephen (2007). Roy: Going For Broke. Hardie Grant Books. ISBN 978-1-74066-580-3.

=== Contributor ===
- Symonds, Andrew (2007). "Contributor". Laugh Even Louder!. By Camp Quality. Gosford, New South Wales: Scholastic Australia Pty Limited. ISBN 978-1-74169-022-4.
