= Jo Angel =

Australian cricketer (born 1968)

Personal information
- Born: 22 April 1968 (age 58); Mount Lawley, Western Australia, Australia
- Height: 198 cm (6 ft 6 in)
- Batting: Left-handed
- Bowling: Right-arm fast
- Role: Bowler

International information
- National side: Australia
- Test debut (cap 355): 30 January 1993 v West Indies
- Last Test: 3 February 1995 v England
- ODI debut (cap 118): 13 September 1994 v Sri Lanka
- Last ODI: 22 February 1995 v India

Domestic team information
- Years: Team
- 1991/92–2003/04: Western Australia
- 2002: Gloucestershire

Career statistics
Competition	Test	ODI	FC
Matches	4	3	121
Runs scored	35	–	1398
Batting average	5.83	–	12.26
100s/50s	0/0	–	0/4
Top score	11	–	84*
Balls bowled	748	162	25,451
Wickets	10	4	485
Bowling average	46.29	28.25	25.10
5 wickets in innings	0	0	16
10 wickets in match	0	0	1
Best bowling	3/54	2/47	6/35
Catches/stumpings	1/–	0/–	30/–
- Source: ESPNcricinfo, 14 April 2020

Jo Angel (born 22 April 1968) is an Australian former cricketer who played in four Test matches and three One Day Internationals from 1993 to 1995. A giant fast bowler standing 6 feet 6 inches (198 cm) tall, Angel took 485 first-class wickets, including 445 in Australian domestic cricket for Western Australia.

== Biography ==
Born in Mount Lawley, Western Australia, Angel made his Test debut against the West Indies at the WACA Ground in 1993, forcing Desmond Haynes to retire hurt after hitting him in the face with a short ball.

He toured Sri Lanka in 1994 for the Singer Cup one-day tournament with some degree of success as the other Australian pacemen struggled in the heat and slow conditions. However he did not make a consistent impact and was dropped shortly after.

While his international career did not take off, Angel helped carry the Western Australian attack and holds the career wickets record for Western Australia. On 28 July 2000 he was awarded the Australian Sports Medal for being "fourth on list of all time greatest wicket takers for Western Australia" and is the only bowler to have taken 400 or more wickets for the state in the Sheffield Shield with 419 wickets. He also took a further 26 wickets in other First-class matches for Western Australia, bringing his total to 445.
