= West Indian cricket team in Australia in 2005–06 =

International cricket tour

West Indian cricket team in Australia in 2005-06
	West Indies	Australia
- Dates: 3 November – 29 November
Captains	Shivnarine Chanderpaul	Ricky Ponting

Test series
- Result: Australia won the 3-match series 3–0
Most runs	Brian Lara (345)	Matthew Hayden (445)
Most wickets	Dwayne Bravo (8)	Brett Lee (18)
- Player of the series: Matthew Hayden (Aus)

The West Indies cricket team toured Australia in October and November 2005 as part of the 2005–06 Australian cricket season. The West Indian cricket team were looking to prove that they could perform against the number one rated side in the world. Australia on the other hand would look to build on their World XI performance and prove their Ashes critics wrong - and after winning the first two Tests by convincing margins, the Australians secured the series win to retain the Frank Worrell Trophy for the sixth time running. The West Indies were looking to avoid the series whitewash for the second consecutive time, and posted their highest total of the series in the first innings of the third Test, with Brian Lara making 226 to pass Allan Border as the all-time highest scorer in Test cricket.

== Squads ==
Tests
Australia	West Indies
Ricky Ponting (c); Nathan Bracken; Adam Gilchrist (wk); Matthew Hayden; Brad Hodge; Michael Hussey; Simon Katich; Justin Langer; Brett Lee; Stuart MacGill; Glenn McGrath; Andrew Symonds; Shane Warne; Shane Watson	Shivnarine Chanderpaul (c); Dwayne Bravo; Corey Collymore; Fidel Edwards; Chris Gayle; Wavell Hinds; Brian Lara; Jermaine Lawson; Daren Powell; Denesh Ramdin (wk); Marlon Samuels; Ramnaresh Sarwan; Devon Smith; Dwayne Smith

Note:

- Justin Langer was out for the first two Tests due to a rib injury sustained in a domestic game. Mike Hussey replaced Langer for the first two Tests.
- Simon Katich was dropped after the first Test due to poor form. Brad Hodge was called up in his place for the next two Tests.
- Michael Clarke played in the first two Tests but was dropped for the third Test due to poor form with the bat. Justin Langer recovered from injury and returned to action in the third Test and Mike Hussey kept his place in the third Test due to Clarke being dropped.
- Shane Watson injured his shoulder during the first Test and Andrew Symonds was called up as his replacement for the second and third Tests.
- Nathan Bracken played in the first Test but was denoted as 12th man for the second and third Tests, and Stuart MacGill took his place in the side for the last two Tests.

== Tour matches ==
=== First-class: Queensland v West Indians ===
27–30 October 2005
Scorecard

Queensland	v	West Indians
323 (78.4 overs); Ryan Le Loux 63 (104); Daren Powell 4/58 (14 overs)		612 (143.1 overs); Marlon Samuels 257 (304); Chris Simpson 4/173 (39 overs)
378/9 (99 overs); Martin Love 108 (188); Marlon Samuels 5/87 (29 overs)

Match drawn
Allan Border Field, Brisbane
Umpires: Tim Laycock (Aus) and David Orchard (Aus)

- Queensland won the toss and elected to bat.

=== First-class: Victoria v West Indians ===
11–13 November 2005
Scorecard

Victoria	v	West Indians
571 (122.4 overs); Brad Hodge 177 (178); Dwayne Smith 3/50 (15.4 overs)		302 (101.2 overs); Shivnarine Chanderpaul 59 (177); Allan Wise 3/47 (25 overs)

Match drawn
Junction Oval, Melbourne
Umpires: Geoff Morrow (Aus) and Tony Ward (Aus)

- Victoria won the toss and elected to bat.
- Lloyd Mash and Peter Siddle (both Vic) made their first-class debuts.

=== Twenty20: Victoria v West Indians ===
13 November 2005
16:30
Scorecard

West Indians; 172/6 (20 overs)	v	Victoria; 173/6 (19.3 overs)
Dwayne Smith 81* (40); Allan Wise 2/18 (3 overs)		Lloyd Mash 32 (12); Dwayne Bravo 3/40 (3 overs)

Victoria won by 4 wickets
Junction Oval, Melbourne
Umpires: Geoff Morrow (Aus) and Tony Ward (Aus)

- No toss. West Indians batted first by agreement.
- After the first-class match ended early, this match was added onto the final day to fill in time.

=== 50-over: Prime Minister's XI v West Indies ===
2 December 2005
10:00
Scorecard

Prime Minister's XI; 316/4 (50 overs)	v	West Indians; 174/3 (31.1 overs)
Adam Voges 91 (104); Tino Best 2/50 (10 overs)		Ramnaresh Sarwan 90 (73); Brett Dorey 2/24 (6 overs)

Prime Minister's XI won by 6 runs (D/L method)
Manuka Oval, Canberra
Umpires: Paul Reiffel (Aus) and Andrew Shelley (Aus)
Player of the match: Ramnaresh Sarwan (WI)

- Prime Minister's XI won the toss and elected to bat.
- Prime Minister's XI replacement: Michael Shaw for Callum Ferguson.
- West Indians replacement: Dwayne Bravo for Fidel Edwards.

== Test series ==
=== 1st Test ===
3–6 November
Scorecard

Australia	v	West Indies
435 (105.3 overs); Ricky Ponting 143 (213); Corey Collymore 4/72 (14 overs)		210 (77 overs); Devon Smith 88 (175); Shane Warne 5/48 (28 overs)
283/2d (66 overs); Matthew Hayden 118 (163); Chris Gayle 2/74 (27 overs)		129 (49 overs); Chris Gayle 33 (57); Brett Lee 5/30 (14 overs)

Australia won by 379 runs
The Gabba, Brisbane
Umpires: Ian Howell (RSA) and Rudi Koertzen (RSA)
Player of the match: Ricky Ponting (AUS)

- West Indies won the toss and elected to field.
- Rain delayed the start of days 2 and 3. Bad light stopped play early on day 3.
- Michael Hussey (AUS) made his Test debut.

Australia as expected ran out comfortable winners in the first Test. Mike Hussey on his debut made just one run in his first innings - his only single-figure score on tour. Ricky Ponting was the highest scorer of the Australian first innings, notching up 149 runs before being dismissed by Jermaine Lawson. Adam Gilchrist (44), Shane Warne (47), Brett Lee (47) and Nathan Bracken (37) all did well lower down the order to bring the Australian first innings total to 435. Corey Collymore was the standout bowler for the West Indies taking 4 for 72. The West Indies reply was stunted as five batsmen were out in single figures to Warne, with Devon Smith making 88, but the West Indies lost their last eight wickets for 76 to end with 210 - with Brian Lara given out for 30 lbw to Brett Lee, despite replays indicating to commentators that the ball was going on to miss the stumps. Glenn McGrath and Shane Warne shared the other wickets, McGrath removing the top of the order and Warne getting the better of the tail and also dismissing Shivnarine Chanderpaul, the captain, for 2. In Australia's second innings the West Indies only managed two wickets, thanks to part-time off spinner Chris Gayle who took 2 for 74 - the other bowlers were wicketless, and Australia made 283 for 2 before declaring at the end of the third day. Mike Hussey was dismissed for 29 in his second Test innings, while Matthew Hayden made a century for the third Test running with 118. Captain Ricky Ponting also passed the hundred mark, his second hundred of the game - the first time Ponting has achieved this in Test match cricket. Put in to bat on the fourth morning, the West Indies needed to chase down a total of 509 to win the match, which would be a record victory in the history of Test cricket if they were to do so. However, with the top score of the innings being Gayle's 33, and only four players making it into double figures, they fell well short. Nathan Bracken took 4 for 48 including the prize wicket of Brian Lara, while Brett Lee took 5 for 30 including the wickets of Devon Smith, Ramnaresh Sarwan, Denesh Ramdin, Corey Collymore and Jermaine Lawson as the West Indies surrendered in 49 overs to lose the match by 379 runs. (CricInfo scorecard)

=== 2nd Test ===
17–21 November
Scorecard

West Indies	v	Australia
149 (68.3 overs); Chris Gayle 56 (116); Glenn McGrath 4/31 (23 overs)		406 (109.4 overs); Michael Hussey 137 (234); Fidel Edwards 3/116 (27.4 overs)
334 (122 overs); Dwayne Bravo 113 (202); Shane Warne 4/112 (39 overs)		78/1 (26.1 overs); Matthew Hayden 46 (73); Chris Gayle 1/16 (6 overs)

Australia won by 9 wickets
Bellerive Oval, Hobart
Umpires: Aleem Dar (PAK) and Rudi Koertzen (RSA)
Player of the match: Michael Hussey (AUS)

- West Indies won the toss and elected to bat.
- Rain washed out parts of day 3. Bad light stopped play early on day 2.
- Brad Hodge (AUS) made his Test debut.
- Michael Hussey (Aus) scored his first century in Tests.

The West Indies lasted one day longer at Hobart than in the first Test at Brisbane, but still lost to surrender the series with a game to play, despite winning the toss and elected to bat first. Chris Gayle made 56 before he was given out lbw to a ball missing leg stump, while Shivnarine Chanderpaul made 39 but other than that, no batsman managed to pass 15, and six batsmen were dismissed in single figures. Brian Lara made 13 but was again given out lbw to a Brett Lee yorker. Gayle enjoyed a slice of luck during his half-century, as he was caught off a no-ball bowled by Andrew Symonds, who went wicketless. Glenn McGrath was the pick of the bowlers with 4 for 31 from 23 overs, while Brett Lee and Stuart MacGill shared the remaining six wickets. Australia's first-wicket partnership of Matthew Hayden and Mike Hussey then outscored the entire West Indies innings, and well more, as they went on to make 231 before Collymore had Hayden caught. Hayden made 113 and Hussey made his maiden Test century before being caught off the bowling of Dwayne Bravo for 137 - having batted for 388 minutes. Brad Hodge made 60 in his first Test innings, while the other batsmen were dismissed for scores below 25, as the Australian innings totalled 406. Fidel Edwards got the most wickets, with three for 116 including skipper Ponting and Michael Clarke, while Dwayne Bravo and Corey Collymore got two wickets each - Collymore tying the Australians down with 11 maiden overs and an economy rate just below two. Yet, the West Indies lost their first six wickets for 140, needing 117 to avoid yet another innings defeat before Dwayne Bravo and Denesh Ramdin added 182 for the seventh wicket - both making their highest career scores with 113 (Bravo) and 71 (Ramdin). Brian Lara made 45 before he was given out caught behind Adam Gilchrist off the bowling of Shane Warne - with there being a sound, the ball could have hit bat or pad, but the umpire was convinced it hit bat first and gave Lara out. Glenn McGrath was again economical, picking up 2 for 29 off 25 overs. Brett Lee took 2 for 99, Stuart MacGill took 2 for 69 and Shane Warne took 4 for 112 in the West Indies total of 334 - after Ramdin went, breaking the partnership, the last three wickets yielded 12 runs. Australia needed 78 runs for victory and they got their comfortably with the only minor fault in their innings was Matthew Hayden, who was caught at cover, a fielding position in the outfield, by Devon Smith off the bowling of Chris Gayle, as Australia were on nought for 77 and only needed a single for victory. Gayle finished up with figures of 1 for 16 from 6 overs, once again the only bowler to take second-innings wickets. In front of a fifth-day crowd of 800 - most preferred to watch the run-chase on TV - Mike Hussey was left to hit the winning run as Australia went on to win by nine wickets. (CricInfo scorecard)

=== 3rd Test ===
25–29 November
Scorecard

West Indies	v	Australia
405 (111.2 overs); Brian Lara 226 (298); Glenn McGrath 3/106 (30 overs)		428 (123.3 overs); Michael Hussey 133 (215); Dwayne Bravo 6/84 (27 overs)
204 (81 overs); Dwayne Bravo 64 (126); Shane Warne 6/80 (33 overs)		182/3 (58 overs); Matthew Hayden 87* (174); Corey Collymore 2/51 (20 overs)

Australia won by 7 wickets
Adelaide Oval, Adelaide
Umpires: Aleem Dar (PAK) and Billy Bowden (NZ)
Player of the match: Brian Lara (WIN)

- West Indies won the toss and elected to bat.
