= Australian cricket team in the West Indies in 2003 =

International cricket tour

| | West Indies | Australia |
- Dates: 10 April – 1 June 2003
| Captains | Brian Lara | Steve Waugh |

Test series
- Result: Australia won the 4-match series 3–1
| Most runs | Brian Lara (533) | Ricky Ponting (523) |
| Most wickets | Jermaine Lawson (14) | Stuart MacGill (20) |
- Player of the series: Ricky Ponting

One Day International series
- Results: Australia won the 7-match series 4–3
| Most runs | Wavell Hinds (352) | Andrew Symonds (275) |
| Most wickets | Chris Gayle (11) | Brett Lee (11) |
- Player of the series: Wavell Hinds

The Australian cricket team toured the West Indies from April to June, 2003, outside the normal West Indies cricket season, to play for the Frank Worrell Trophy.

It was Steve Waugh's last tour overseas and Australia were without Shane Warne who was on a drugs ban and missing Glenn McGrath for two of the Tests through injury. Their absence was compounded by slow pitches, particularly at Bridgetown, and Australia played 5 bowlers in all four Tests.

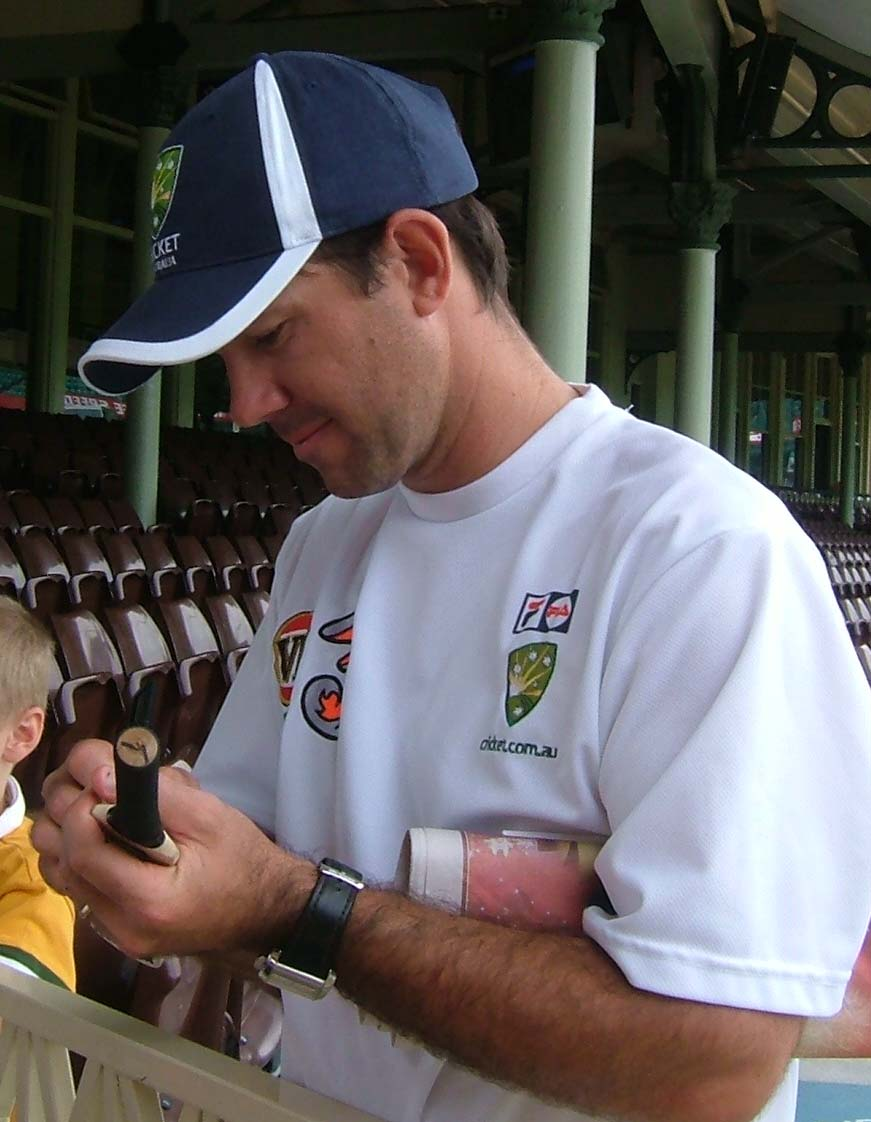
Ricky Ponting (player of the test series) signing a bat

== Squads ==
Australia
- Steve Waugh (c)
- Adam Gilchrist (wk)
- Andrew Bichel
- Jason Gillespie
- Matthew Hayden
- Brad Hogg
- Justin Langer
- Brett Lee
- Darren Lehmann
- Martin Love
- Stuart MacGill
- Glenn McGrath
- Ricky Ponting
- Michael Bevan*
- Michael Clarke*
- Nathan Hauritz*
- Ian Harvey*
- Jimmy Maher*
- Andrew Symonds*
West Indies
- Brian Lara (c)
- Carlton Baugh (wk)
- Ridley Jacobs (wk)
- Omari Banks
- Dave Bernard
- Tino Best
- Shivnarine Chanderpaul
- Pedro Collins
- Mervyn Dillon
- Vasbert Drakes
- Daren Ganga
- Chris Gayle
- Wavell Hinds
- Jermaine Lawson
- Marlon Samuels
- Ramnaresh Sarwan
- Devon Smith
- Corey Collymore*
- Ryan Hurley*
- Ricardo Powell*

* ODIs only

== Tour background ==
In early 2003, Australian leg-spinner Shane Warne was banned from cricket by the Australian Cricket Board drugs panel. In a drug test, Warne was found to be positive for hydrochlorothiazide and amiloride, a form of diuretic. His year long ban saw Warne miss the 2003 Cricket World Cup as well as Australia's tour of the West Indies. Warne has denied taking performance-enhancing drugs and claimed that the substance was a fluid tablet from his mother.

Fast bowler Glenn McGrath would be granted leave from the tour early on and would return home to Australia to support his wife Jane, who had recently been diagnosed with metastatic disease in her hip.

== Tour match ==
26 – 28 April 2003
Scorecard

| University of the West Indies Vice Chancellors XI | v | Australians |
| 290 (71 overs); Chris Gayle 129; Stuart MacGill 5/40 (13 overs) | | 358/6d (91.3 overs); Jimmy Maher 142; Corey Collymore 2/54 (22 overs) |
| 162 (37 overs); Philo Wallace 53; Stuart MacGill 5/45 (12 overs) | | 95/4 (21.2 overs); Michael Clarke 47; Chris Gayle 1/7 (3 overs) |

Australia won by 6 wickets
Three Ws Oval, Barbados
Umpires: Dalton Holder
Player of the match: Stuart MacGill (Australia)

The university would win the toss in this tour match and elect to bat first. A young Chris Gayle would score a century, assisted by Jason Haynes, who would score a half century, but would be the only real resistance against the Australians. Stuart MacGill would take five wickets for the Australians, giving them momentum going into their innings, where Langer and Maher would start the innings with a 202 run partnership. The Aussies would declare with 258 runs on the board. A poor second innings would follow for the Chancellor's XI, with them only managing to set Australia a target of 95 runs. MacGill would grab another five wicket haul to give him 10 wickets for the match, and subsequently man of the match honours as the Aussies shuffled their batting line up to easily take victory.

== Test series ==
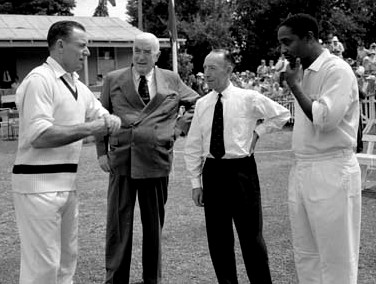
Sir Robert Menzies, Ray Lindwall, Lindsay Hassett and Sir Frank Worrell, taken in Canberra in 1961.

The teams played a four-match Test series, competing for the Frank Worrell Trophy, named after the first black captain of the West Indies. The trophy was first contested during 1960/61 in Australia, with the home nation being victorious.

=== 1st Test ===
10 – 13 April 2003
Scorecard

| West Indies | v | Australia |
| 237 (50.3 overs); Shivnarine Chanderpaul 100 (72); Andy Bichel 3/30 (14 overs) | | 489 (115.1 overs); Justin Langer 146 (270); Vasbert Drakes 5/93 (26.1 overs) |
| 398 (105.2 overs); Daren Ganga 113 (225); Jason Gillespie 5/39 (20.2 overs) | | 147/1 (42.1 overs); Justin Langer 78 (113); Jermaine Lawson 1/31 (9 overs) |

Australia won by 9 wickets
Georgetown, Guyana
Umpires: Rudi Koertzen and Asoka de Silva
Player of the match: Justin Langer (Australia)

West Indies captain Brian Lara won the toss and chose to bat first on a flat pitch. West Indies scored 237, with a century by Shivnarine Chanderpaul, but Australia, led by centuries from both Justin Langer and Ricky Ponting scored 489 in reply. West Indies replied with centuries from Ganga and Lara in the second innings, but left Australia a small target of 147, which was chased with the loss of only one wicket. Due to the flat nature of the pitch, Australia would benefit by using the unorthodox strategy of playing five bowlers, which proved to be a major factor in their victory. Justin Langer would be named man of the match, top scoring in both innings for the Australians.

=== 2nd Test ===
19 – 23 April 2003
Scorecard

| Australia | v | West Indies |
| 576/4d (132.5 overs); Ricky Ponting 206 (362); Mervyn Dillon 2/124 (28.5 overs) | | 408 (119 overs); Daren Ganga 117 (238); Brett Lee 4/69 (23 overs) |
| 238/3d (66.2 overs); Matthew Hayden 100* (180); Mervyn Dillon 2/64 (18.2 overs) | | 288 (89.2 overs); Brian Lara 122 (208); Andy Bichel 3/21 (13 overs) |

Australia won by 118 runs
Port of Spain, Trinidad
Umpires: Rudi Koertzen and Asoka de Silva
Player of the match: Ricky Ponting (Australia)

Australia would win the toss and elect to bat first. The decision was criticised after the early dismissal of the Aussie openers, but Ponting and Lehmann would steady the ship with a 335 run partnership. The West Indian captain would hit another century, to get the West Indies to 408. In the Australian second innings Mathew Hayden would stand up with a century just before Waugh's declaration. On the last day the West Indies would fall 118 runs short of the 407 run target, giving Australia a 2–0 lead in the series.

=== 3rd Test ===
1 – 5 May 2003
Scorecard

| Australia | v | West Indies |
| 605/9d (154.3 overs); Steve Waugh 115 (233); Jermaine Lawson 3/131 (32.3 overs) | | 328 (128.5 overs); Chris Gayle 71 (155); Stuart MacGill 4/107 (39.5 overs) |
| 8/1 (2.3 overs); Darren Lehmann 4* (8); Jermaine Lawson 1/2 (1 overs) | | 284 (116 overs); Ramnaresh Sarwan 58 (135); Stuart MacGill 5/75 (36 overs) |

Australia won by 9 wickets
Bridgetown, Barbados
Umpires: Srinivas Venkataraghavan and David Shepherd
Player of the match: Stuart MacGill (Australia)

After winning the toss the West Indies made the controversial decision of electing to field first. This Test would be controlled by Shane Warne's replacement, Stuart MacGill who took 4 and 5 wickets in each innings respectively. This test would mark the return of Glen McGrath from time with his wife. Australia's current and incumbent captains Waugh and Ponting would score centuries in the first innings, with Australia declaring for 609 runs. The future of Australian cricket was clear, but the West Indies had a leadership crisis going on. West Indies would struggle, only scoring 328 then being forced to follow on, where they would only be able to set Australia a target of 8, which was easily chased, clenching the series for the Australians, whilst also moving them to the top of the ICC Test Standings, making them the best test nation in the world.

=== 4th Test ===
9 – 13 May 2003
Scorecard

| Australia | v | West Indies |
| 240 (72.1 overs); Justin Langer 42 (74); Jermaine Lawson 7/78 (19.1 overs) | | 240 (65.3 overs); Brian Lara 68 (94); Andy Bichel 3/53 (14 overs) |
| 417 (104 overs); Matthew Hayden 177 (260); Mervyn Dillon 4/112 (29 overs) | | 418/7 (128.5 overs); Ramnaresh Sarwan 105 (139); Brett Lee 4/63 (23 overs) |

West Indies won by 3 wickets
Antigua Recreation Ground, Antigua
Umpires: Srinivas Venkataraghavan and David Shepherd
Player of the match: Shivnarine Chanderpaul (West Indies)

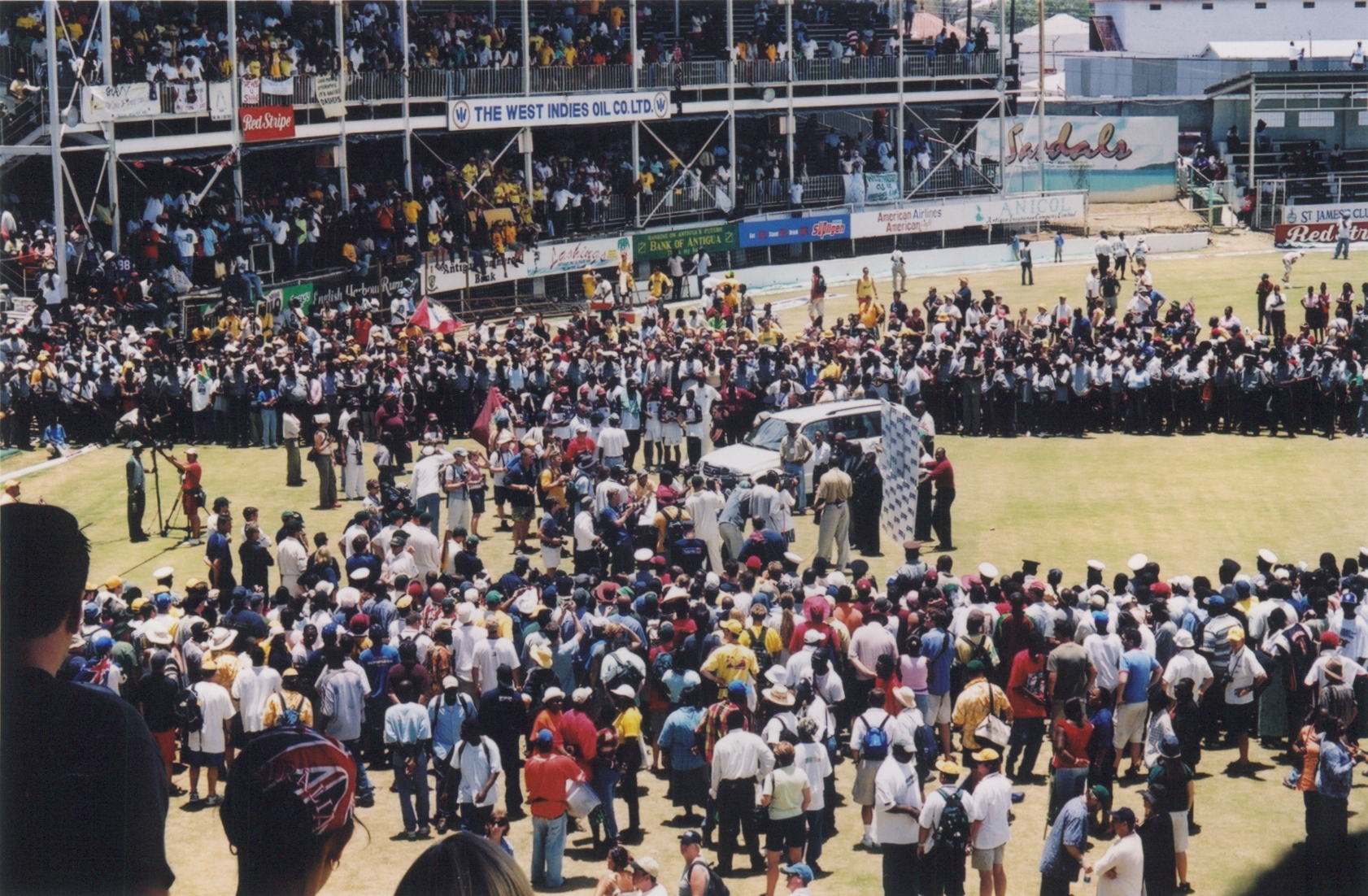
Antigua Recreation Ground WI v AUS 2003-04

The toss was won by Waugh who elected to bat. Ponting, the player of the series and Wisden ‘Leading Player of the Year’ would miss the test due to illness and be replaced by Martin Love, but Australia still struggled with not a single batsman passing 50. However, Jermaine Lawson stood tall for the West Indies, taking seven wickets in the first innings, including both Aussie openers. Lara top scored for the West Indies in their first innings, equalling them with Australia after the first innings at 240. In the 2nd innings both Aussie openers would past the century mark, with the first wicket falling for 242, more than both teams first innings total. They went on the set the Caribbean a record chase of 418.

They struggled early, being 74/3, but Sarwan and Chanderpaul would both stand up for the nation with centuries. Controversy would come out of this innings, due to a sledging incident between McGrath and Sarwan. McGrath asked Sarwan, “What does Brian Lara’s d*** taste like?”, to which the West Indian replied, “I don’t know, ask your wife”. This aggravated McGrath, who had missed the first two tests in the series due to his wife's cancer. The exchange culminated with McGrath saying “If you ever fucking mention my wife again I’ll fucking rip your fucking throat out!”. The verbal barrage would not impact the West Indies as they set the record for the highest successful 4th innings run chase in test cricket and won the match, to bring the series to 3-1 Australia.

== ODI series ==
The teams played a seven match One Day International series following the conclusion of the Test series.

=== 1st ODI ===
17 May 2003
Scorecard

| Australia; 5/270 (50 overs) | v | West Indies; 205/8 (37 overs) |
| Ricky Ponting 59 (66); Omari Banks 2/44 (8 overs) | | Ramnaresh Sarwan 47* (34); Ian Harvey 3/37 (7 overs) |

Australia won by 2 runs (D/L Method)
Sabina Park, Jamaica
Umpires: David Shepherd and Billy Doctrove
Player of the match: Ricky Ponting (Australia)

- 81 minute rain delay, revised target of 208 off 37 overs

The West Indies won the toss and chose to field first. Jason Gillespie would be rested and Ricky Ponting would return from his illness to captain the Australians, top scoring with 59. Australia would finish 270/5 with high strike rate innings from Bevan and Harvey. The West Indies would struggle in their chase with no batsman passing 50. During their innings rain would stop play and meant a revised target would be set of 208, which would need to be scored in 37 overs, which the West Indies fell 3 short of to give Australia an early lead in the series. Continuing their record-breaking winning streak in ODI's.

=== 2nd ODI ===
18 May 2003
Scorecard

| West Indies; 163 (49 overs) | v | Australia; 166/2 (35.1 overs) |
| Ricardo Powell 32 (42); Glenn McGrath 4/31 (10 overs) | | Ricky Ponting 57* (71); Corey Collymore 1/35 (8.1 overs) |

Australia won by 8 wickets
Sabina Park, Jamaica
Umpires: David Shepherd and Billy Doctrove
Player of the match: Glenn McGrath (Australia)

The West Indies would again win the toss but choose to bat first. The Caribbean nations would struggle with the bat, with not a single batsman passing 50 and them being all out for 163. Glen McGrath would be the pick of the bowlers taking 4 wickets in his 10 overs. It was an easy chase for the Australians with Ponting and Hayden scoring half centuries. Glen McGrath would receive man of the match honours and Australia would go up 2–0 in the series.

=== 3rd ODI ===
21 May 2003
Scorecard

| Australia; 4/258 (50 overs) | v | West Indies; 233/9 (50 overs) |
| Andrew Symonds 75 (82); Mervyn Dillon 1/36 (10 overs) | | Chris Gayle 43 (46); Jason Gillespie 2/48 (10 overs) |

Australia won by 25 runs
Darren Sammy National Cricket Stadium, St Lucia
Umpires: David Shepherd and Billy Doctrove
Player of the match: Michael Clarke (Australia)

The West Indies would continue their domination of the coin toss, electing to field first. The Australians would struggle early, but allrounder Andrew Symonds and future captain Michael Clarke would each score 75 in a 95 run partnership to help Australia to 258. The West Indies would continue their struggles with the bat, with no batsmen going on to get big scores, although many got starts. Jason Gillespie would be the pick of the Aussie bowlers and Michael Clarke would be man of the match as Australia went one win away from leading the series.

=== 4th ODI ===
24 May 2003
Scorecard

| Australia; 5/286 (50 overs) | v | West Indies; 219 (45.3 overs) |
| Adam Gilchrist 84 (103); Vasbert Drakes 2/62 (10 overs) | | Chris Gayle 84 (113); Jason Gillespie 2/30 (8 overs) |

Australia won by 67 runs
Queen's Park Oval, Trinidad
Umpires: Rudi Koertzen and Eddie Nicholls
Player of the match: Adam Gilchrist (Australia)

Australia would finally win the ever important toss and choose to bat first. Adam Gilchrist would be the pick of the Australian players with an 84 and Michael Clarke would contribute with 55. Vasbert Drakes would pick up 2 wickets for the West Indies to keep them in the match. The team in maroon would need 287 in the 50 overs. future captain Chris Gayle fought hard with an 84, but the rest of his team would collapse, with them only managing 219. The wickets would be spread amongst the aussie bowlers with Ponting and Symonds getting runouts to help Australia to a series victory and Adam Gilchrist would be named man of the match.

=== 5th ODI ===
25 May 2003
Scorecard

| West Indies; 5/290 (50 overs) | v | Australia; 9/251 (50 overs) |
| Brian Lara 80 (101); Brett Lee 3/86 (10 overs) | | Andrew Symonds 77 (85); Mervyn Dillon 4/40 (9 overs) |

West Indies won by 39 runs
Queen's Park Oval, Trinidad
Umpires: Rudi Koertzen and Billy Doctrove
Player of the match: Brian Lara (West Indies)

The West Indies again won the toss and elected to bat first. Hinds and Lara put on a 178 run partnership to guide the West Indies to a 290 run total. Brett Lee was the pick of the bowlers taking 3 wickets. Only Andrew Symonds would stand up for Australia with 77, Mervyn Dillon took 3 wickets for the Caribbean, leading them to a victory by 39 runs. In this match David Bernard would debut and Brian Lara will be named man of the match.

=== 6th ODI ===
30 May 2003
Scorecard

| Australia; 252 (50 overs) | v | West Indies; 254/7 (48.4 overs) |
| Adam Gilchrist 64 (66); Chris Gayle 3/37 (10 overs) | | Wavell Hinds 125* (140); Brett Lee 3/50 (9.4 overs) |

West Indies won by 3 wickets
National Cricket Stadium, Grenada
Umpires: Rudi Koertzen and Eddie Nicholls
Player of the match: Wavell Hinds (West Indies)

Australia won the toss and elected to bat. An opening stand of 90 would help them to 252, but they lost constant wickets. Chris Gayle would be the pick of the bowlers taking 3 wickets and then scoring 18 runs. Wavell Hinds would be named player of the match after his century, The West Indies would win with 8 balls to spare and would bring the series to 4-2 going into the final match of the tour.

=== 7th ODI ===
1 June 2003
Scorecard

| Australia; 8/247 (50 overs) | v | West Indies; 1/249 (43.3 overs) |
| Darren Lehmann 107 (109); Chris Gayle 5/46 (10 overs) | | Wavell Hinds 103* (130); Andrew Symonds 1/36 (5 overs) |

West Indies won by 9 wickets
National Cricket Stadium, Grenada
Umpires: Rudi Koertzen and Billy Doctrove
Player of the match: Chris Gayle (West Indies)

Australia would win the toss in the final match of the tour and elected to bat first. Darren Lehmann would make an impact scoring a century before being dismissed by Chris Gayle. Gayle would take a 5 wicket haul, then score 60 in a 116 run partnership with Hinds who scored a century. It was a tough decision for man of the match, but it would be awarded to Gayle, but Hinds would be acknowledged with the player of the series award, after criticism of underperforming in the recent World Cup, and helped the West Indies bring the series up to a respectable 4–3.

== Statistics ==
=== Tests ===
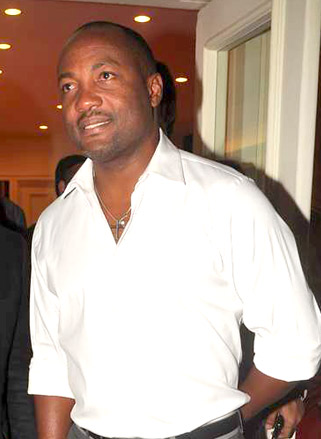
Rahul Bose and Brian Lara at the Standard Chartered Mumbai Marathon 2012 pre bash

==== Batting ====
| Player | Team | Runs | High Score | Average |
|---|---|---|---|---|
| Brian Lara | West Indies | 533 | 122 | 66.62 |
| Ricky Ponting | Australia | 523 | 206 | 130.75 |
| Justin Langer | Australia | 483 | 146 | 69.00 |

==== Bowling ====
| Player | Team | Wickets | Average | Best Bowling |
|---|---|---|---|---|
| Stuart MacGill | Australia | 20 | 33.90 | 5/75 |
| Jason Gillespie | Australia | 17 | 20.76 | 5/39 |
| Brett Lee | Australia | 17 | 28.88 | 4/63 |

=== ODIs ===
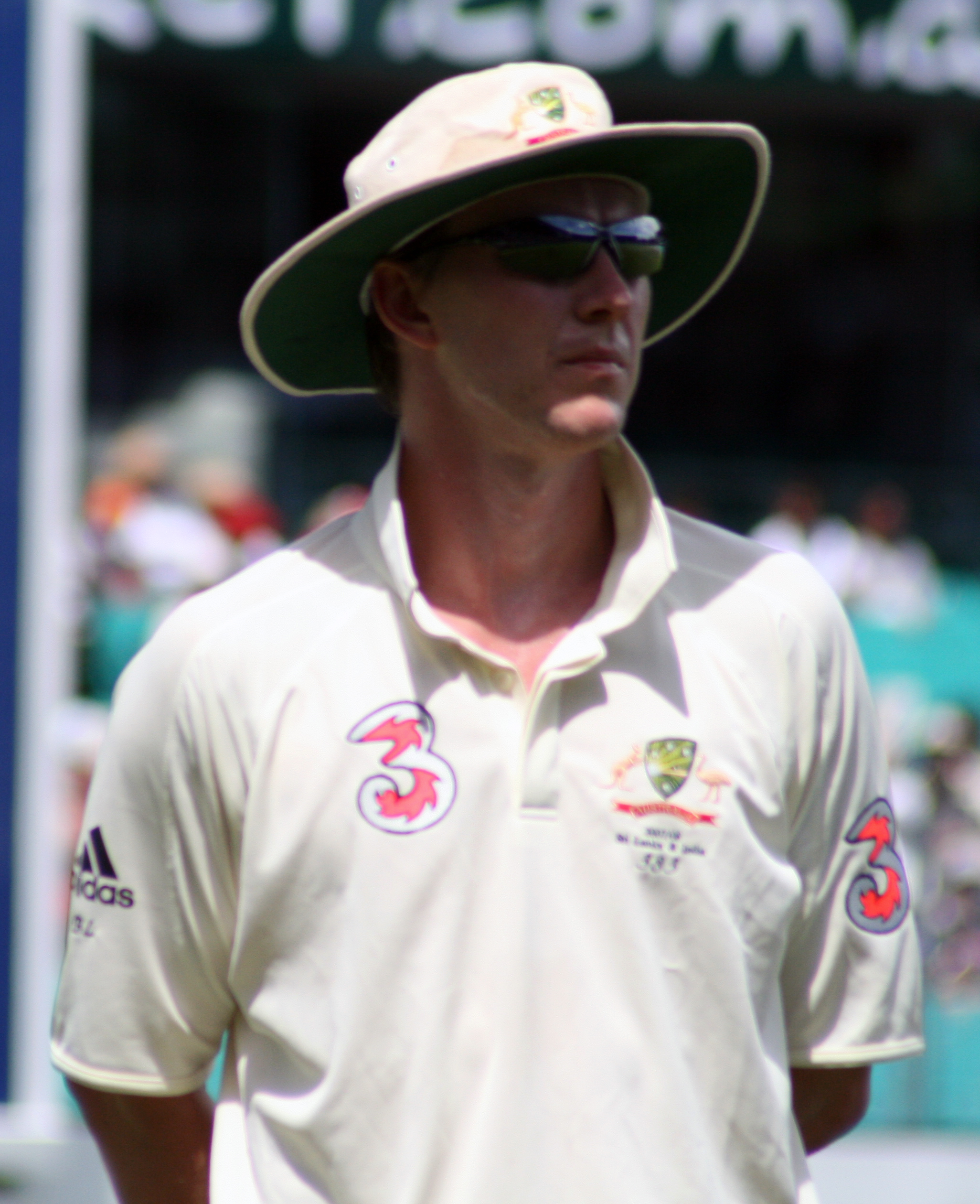
Brett Lee at the SCG, 3rd Day, Australia vs India, 4th Jan 2008

==== Batting ====
| Player | Team | Runs | High Score | Average |
|---|---|---|---|---|
| Wavell Hinds | West Indies | 352 | 125* | 117.33 |
| Chris Gayle | West Indies | 275 | 84 | 39.28 |
| Andrew Symonds | Australia | 275 | 77 | 45.83 |

==== Bowling ====
| Player | Team | Wickets | Average | Best Bowling |
|---|---|---|---|---|
| Brett Lee | Australia | 11 | 22.36 | 3/50 |
| Chris Gayle | West Indies | 11 | 27.18 | 5/46 |
| Glenn McGrath | Australia | 7 | 28.00 | 4/31 |
