= West Indian cricket team in Australia in 2023–24 =

International cricket tour

West Indies cricket team in Australia in 2023–24
	Australia	West Indies
- Dates: 10 January – 13 February 2024
Captains	Pat Cummins (Tests); Steve Smith (ODIs); Mitchell Marsh (T20Is)	Kraigg Brathwaite (Tests); Shai Hope (ODIs); Rovman Powell (T20Is)

Test series
- Result: 2-match series drawn 1–1
Most runs	Usman Khawaja (139)	Kirk McKenzie (138)
Most wickets	Josh Hazlewood (14)	Shamar Joseph (13)
- Player of the series: Shamar Joseph (WI)

One Day International series
- Results: Australia won the 3-match series 3–0
Most runs	Cameron Green (110)	Keacy Carty (138)
Most wickets	Xavier Bartlett (8)	Gudakesh Motie (4)
- Player of the series: Xavier Bartlett (Aus)

Twenty20 International series
- Results: Australia won the 3-match series 2–1
Most runs	David Warner (173)	Andre Russell (109)
Most wickets	Marcus Stoinis (5); Adam Zampa (5)	Romario Shepherd (4)
- Player of the series: David Warner (Aus)

The West Indies cricket team toured Australia in January and February 2024 to play two Tests, three One Day International (ODI) and three Twenty20 International (T20I) matches. The Test series, where the teams were competing for the Frank Worrell Trophy, formed part of the 2023–2025 ICC World Test Championship. The T20I series formed part of both teams' preparation for the 2024 Men's T20 World Cup tournament.

Australia won the first Test by 10 wickets. The West Indies won the second Test by 8 runs, to draw the Test series 1-1. The defeat in the second Test was Australia's first ever in day/night Tests after winning on the previous 11 occasions. It was the West Indies' first Test win in Australia since February 1997. Australia won all three ODI matches, whitewashing the West Indies.

== Squads ==
Australia			West Indies		
Tests	ODIs	T20Is	Tests	ODIs	T20Is
Pat Cummins (c); Steve Smith (vc); Scott Boland; Alex Carey (wk); Cameron Green; Josh Hazlewood; Travis Head; Usman Khawaja; Marnus Labuschagne; Nathan Lyon; Mitchell Marsh; Matt Renshaw; Mitchell Starc	Steve Smith (c); Travis Head (vc); Sean Abbott; Xavier Bartlett; ~~Nathan Ellis~~; Jake Fraser-McGurk; Cameron Green; Aaron Hardie; Josh Hazlewood; Josh Inglis (wk); Spencer Johnson; Marnus Labuschagne; ~~Glenn Maxwell~~; Ben McDermott; Lance Morris; ~~Jhye Richardson~~; Matthew Short; Will Sutherland; Adam Zampa	Mitchell Marsh (c); Sean Abbott; Wes Agar; Xavier Bartlett; Jason Behrendorff; Tim David; ~~Nathan Ellis~~; Jake Fraser-McGurk; Aaron Hardie; Josh Hazlewood; ~~Travis Head~~; Josh Inglis (wk); Spencer Johnson; Glenn Maxwell; ~~Matthew Short~~; Marcus Stoinis; Matthew Wade (wk); David Warner; Adam Zampa	Kraigg Brathwaite (c); Alzarri Joseph (vc); Alick Athanaze; Tagenarine Chanderpaul; Joshua Da Silva (wk); Justin Greaves; Kavem Hodge; Tevin Imlach (wk); Akeem Jordan; Shamar Joseph; Zachary McCaskie; Kirk McKenzie; Gudakesh Motie; Kemar Roach; Kevin Sinclair	Shai Hope (c, wk); Alzarri Joseph (vc); Alick Athanaze; Teddy Bishop; Keacy Carty; Roston Chase; Matthew Forde; Justin Greaves; Kavem Hodge; Tevin Imlach (wk); Gudakesh Motie; Kjorn Ottley; Romario Shepherd; Oshane Thomas; Hayden Walsh Jr.	Rovman Powell (c); Shai Hope (vc, wk); Johnson Charles; Roston Chase; Jason Holder; Akeal Hosein; Alzarri Joseph; Brandon King; Kyle Mayers; Gudakesh Motie; Nicholas Pooran (wk); Andre Russell; Sherfane Rutherford; Romario Shepherd; Oshane Thomas

On 22 January 2024, Jake Fraser-McGurk and Xavier Bartlett were added to Australia's ODI squad, with Glenn Maxwell rested and Jhye Richardson ruled out due to an injury.

On 23 January 2024, Will Sutherland replaced injured Nathan Ellis in Australia's ODI squad.

On 3 February 2024, Australia's Josh Hazlewood was added and Bartlett rested for the second ODI only, with Spencer Johnson added to the Australia's squad for the third ODI only. Australia's Travis Head was also rested for the last two ODIs and the T20Is.

On 5 February 2024, Matthew Short was ruled out of the final ODI due to an injury, with Ben McDermott named as replacement in Australia's squad. The following day, Short was also ruled out of the T20I series, with Aaron Hardie named as replacement in Australia's squad.

On 7 February 2024, Nathan Ellis was ruled out of the T20I series due to an injury, with Spencer Johnson named as replacement in Australia's squad.

On 11 February 2024, Xavier Bartlett replaced injured Sean Abbott in the Australia's T20I squad. The following day, Wes Agar and Jake Fraser-McGurk were added, while Hazlewood rested in Australia's squad for the last T20I.

== Tour match ==
10–12 January 2024
Scorecard

West Indies	v	Cricket Australia XI
8/251d (90 overs); Justin Greaves 65 (135); Liam Haskett 3/57 (18 overs)		174 (54.5 overs); Tim Ward 50 (88); Kemar Roach 2/23 (9 overs)
5/315d (80 overs); Joshua Da Silva 105 (158); Liam Haskett 3/65 (11 overs)		5/149 (39 overs); Tim Ward 39 (52); Kevin Sinclair 3/38 (12 overs)

Match drawn
Karen Rolton Oval, Adelaide
Umpires: Michael Graham-Smith (Aus) and Ben Treloar (Aus)

- West Indies won the toss and elected to bat.

== Test series ==
=== 1st Test ===
17–19 January 2024
Scorecard

West Indies	v	Australia
188 (62.1 overs); Kirk McKenzie 50 (94); Pat Cummins 4/41 (17 overs)		283 (81.1 overs); Travis Head 119 (134); Shamar Joseph 5/94 (20 overs)
120 (35.2 overs); Kirk McKenzie 26 (35); Josh Hazlewood 5/35 (14 overs)		26/0 (6.2 overs); Steve Smith 11* (22)

Australia won by 10 wickets
Adelaide Oval, Adelaide
Umpires: Adrian Holdstock (SA) and Nitin Menon (Ind)
Player of the match: Travis Head (Aus)

- Australia won the toss and elected to field.
- Justin Greaves, Kavem Hodge and Shamar Joseph (WI) all made their Test debuts.
- Josh Hazlewood (Aus) took his 250th wicket in Tests.
- Shamar Joseph (WI) took his first five-wicket haul in Tests, becoming the tenth West Indies player to take five wickets on debut. He also became the second West Indies player to take a wicket with his first ball in Test cricket.
- World Test Championship points: Australia 12, West Indies 0

=== 2nd Test ===
25–28 January 2024 (D/N)
Scorecard

West Indies	v	Australia
311 (108 overs); Joshua Da Silva 79 (157); Mitchell Starc 4/82 (24 overs)		289/9d (53 overs); Usman Khawaja 75 (131); Alzarri Joseph 4/84 (14 overs)
193 (72.3 overs); Kirk McKenzie 41 (50); Josh Hazlewood 3/23 (14 overs)		207 (50.5 overs); Steve Smith 91* (146); Shamar Joseph 7/68 (11.5 overs)

West Indies won by 8 runs
The Gabba, Brisbane
Umpires: Nitin Menon (Ind) and Sharfuddoula (Ban)
Player of the match: Shamar Joseph (WI)

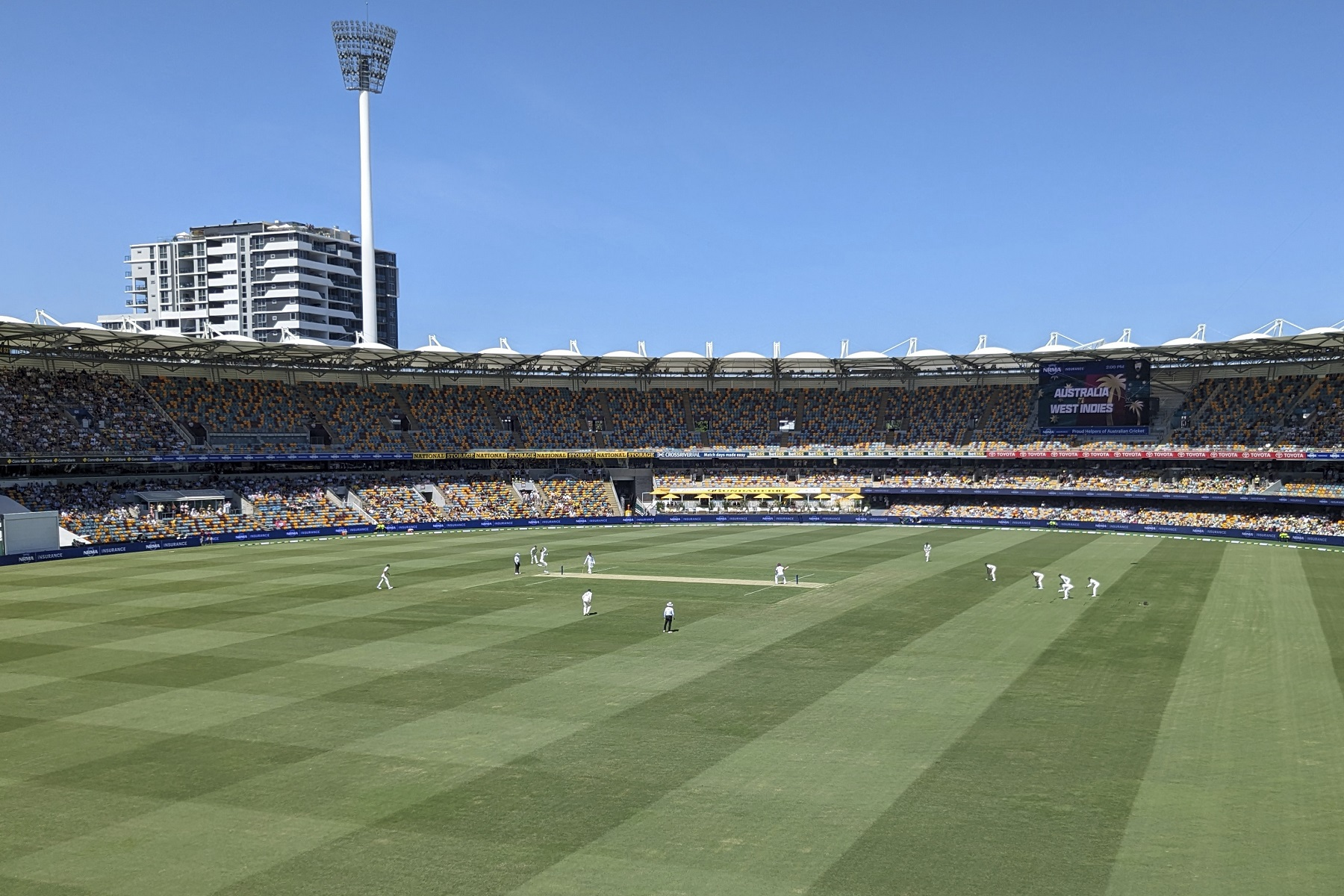
- The first ball of the day/night 'pink ball' cricket test between Australia and the West Indies at The Gabba stadium in Brisbane on 25 January 2024. The bowler was Mitchell Starc and the batter was Kraigg Brathwaite (West Indies).
  West Indies won the toss and elected to bat.
- Kevin Sinclair (WI) made his Test debut.
- Mitchell Starc (Aus) took his 350th wicket in Tests.
- This was the first Test win for the West Indies against Australia since 2003.
- Steve Smith carried his bat in the fourth innings, the first Australian to do so in a Test match since David Warner against New Zealand in 2011.
- World Test Championship points: West Indies 12, Australia 0.

== ODI series ==
=== 1st ODI ===
2 February 2024
14:30 (D/N)
Scorecard

West Indies; 231 (48.4 overs)	v	Australia; 2/232 (38.3 overs)
Keacy Carty 88 (108); Xavier Bartlett 4/17 (9 overs)		Steve Smith 79* (79); Matthew Forde 1/37 (4 overs)

Australia won by 8 wickets
Melbourne Cricket Ground, Melbourne
Umpires: Sam Nogajski (Aus) and Sharfuddoula (Ban)
Player of the match: Xavier Bartlett (Aus)

- Australia won the toss and elected to field.
- Xavier Bartlett and Lance Morris (Aus) both made their ODI debuts.

=== 2nd ODI ===
4 February 2024
14:30 (D/N)
Scorecard

Australia; 9/258 (50 overs)	v	West Indies; 175 (43.3 overs)
Sean Abbott 69 (63); Gudakesh Motie 3/28 (10 overs)		Keacy Carty 40 (51); Sean Abbott 3/40 (10 overs)

Australia won by 83 runs
Sydney Cricket Ground, Sydney
Umpires: Adrian Holdstock (SA) and Sam Nogajski (Aus)
Player of the match: Sean Abbott (Aus)

- West Indies won the toss and elected to field.
- Jake Fraser-McGurk and Will Sutherland (Aus) both made their ODI debuts.

=== 3rd ODI ===
6 February 2024
14:30 (D/N)
Scorecard

West Indies; 86 (24.1 overs)	v	Australia; 2/87 (6.5 overs)
Alick Athanaze 32 (60); Xavier Bartlett 4/21 (7.1 overs)		Jake Fraser-McGurk 44 (18); Oshane Thomas 1/7 (0.5 over)

Australia won by 8 wickets
Manuka Oval, Canberra
Umpires: Sam Nogajski (Aus) and Sharfuddoula (Ban)
Player of the match: Xavier Bartlett (Aus)

- Australia won the toss and elected to field.
- Teddy Bishop (WI) made his ODI debut.
- Australia played in their 1000th ODI.
- This was Australia's biggest ODI win by balls remaining (259 balls).
- This was the shortest completed ODI in Australia (186 balls).

== T20I series ==
=== 1st T20I ===
9 February 2024
19:00 (N)
Scorecard

Australia; 7/213 (20 overs)	v	West Indies; 8/202 (20 overs)
David Warner 70 (36); Andre Russell 3/42 (4 overs)		Brandon King 53 (37); Adam Zampa 3/26 (4 overs)

Australia won by 11 runs
Bellerive Oval, Hobart
Umpires: Gerard Abood (Aus) and Sam Nogajski (Aus)
Player of the match: David Warner (Aus)

- West Indies won the toss and elected to field.
- David Warner (Aus) became the first Australian to play 100 internationals match in each format.
- This was the West Indies' highest T20I score in Australia.

=== 2nd T20I ===
11 February 2024
18:30 (N)
Scorecard

Australia; 4/241 (20 overs)	v	West Indies; 9/207 (20 overs)
Glenn Maxwell 120* (55); Jason Holder 2/42 (4 overs)		Rovman Powell 63 (36); Marcus Stoinis 3/36 (4 overs)

Australia won by 34 runs
Adelaide Oval, Adelaide
Umpires: Gerard Abood (Aus) and Shawn Craig (Aus)
Player of the match: Glenn Maxwell (Aus)

- West Indies won the toss and elected to field.
- Glenn Maxwell (Aus) became the joint–most century scorer in T20Is (5). His 120* was the highest score batting at number 4 in T20Is.
- This was the West Indies' highest score against Australia in T20Is, and their highest in Australia.

=== 3rd T20I ===
13 February 2024
16:00 (D/N)
Scorecard

West Indies; 6/220 (20 overs)	v	Australia; 5/183 (20 overs)
Andre Russell 71 (29); Xavier Bartlett 2/37 (4 overs)		David Warner 81 (49); Roston Chase 2/19 (4 overs)

West Indies won by 37 runs
Perth Stadium, Perth
Umpires: Michael Graham-Smith (Aus) and Sam Nogajski (Aus)
Player of the match: Andre Russell (WI)

- West Indies won the toss and elected to bat.
- Xavier Bartlett (Aus) made his T20I debut.
- Sherfane Rutherford and Andre Russell (WI) recorded the highest sixth wicket partnership in T20Is (139).
- Adam Zampa's 1/65 was the most runs conceded by an Australian in a T20I.
- This was the West Indies' highest score against Australia in T20Is, and their highest in Australia.
