= Frank Worrell Trophy =

West Indies–Australia Test match series cricket trophy

- The Frank Worrell Trophy
- Countries: Australia; West Indies
- Administrator: Cricket Australia; Cricket West Indies
- Format: Test cricket
- First edition: 1960–61 (West Indies)
- Latest edition: 2025 (West Indies)
- Tournament format: Test series
- Number of teams: 2
- Current trophy holder: Australia
- Most successful: Australia (16 series wins)
- Most runs: (Cricket West Indies) Brian Lara (2,815)
- Most wickets: (Cricket West Indies) Courtney Walsh (135)

The Frank Worrell Trophy is awarded to the winner of the West Indies–Australia Test match series in cricket. The trophy is named after Frank Worrell who was the first black captain of the West Indies. It was first awarded at the end of the 1960–61 series in Australia, the first Test of which ended in a tie. The Australian Cricket Board of Control and Don Bradman commissioned former Test cricketer and professional jeweller Ernie McCormick to create a perpetual trophy following the tie. The trophy's design incorporated a ball used in the tied Test.

As of 2025, Australia hold the trophy following the 3–0 series victory in the 2025 series. Australia also lead in overall wins, winning 16 of the 27 series, while the West Indies have won 8, the remaining 3 ending in draws (with the trophy being retained by the incumbents). Brian Lara is the most successful batsman in the history of the trophy, scoring 2,815 runs for the West Indies in 56 innings at an average of 52.12. He also holds the record for the highest score (277) which he made in the third Test at the Sydney Cricket Ground during the 1992–93 series. West Indian fast bowler Courtney Walsh has taken the most wickets in the trophy, with 135 over 38 matches, at an average of 28.68, while Australia's Graham McKenzie has the best bowling figures of 8 wickets for 71 runs, achieved in the second Test of the 1968–69 series. Australian Mark Waugh has taken the most catches, with 45 in 28 matches, while West Indian Jeff Dujon is the most successful wicketkeeper, making 84 dismissals in 23 matches.

== History ==
Frank Worrell became the first black captain of the West Indies cricket team prior to their 1960–61 tour of Australia. The first Test of the five-match series ended in a tie, the first in the history of Test cricket. Don Bradman remarked to Australia captain Richie Benaud, "That is the greatest thing that's ever happened to the game". Evelyn Wellings described the Test as "the Greatest Test Match, the Greatest Cricket Match and surely the Greatest Game ever played with a ball". Despite that setback, with Benaud claiming the Australians had "thrown away a match", they went on to win the series 2–1 with one drawn Test. Former cricketer and journalist Johnny Moyes declared the series to be "the most wonderful cricket tour Australia has known". The West Indies team received acclaim for their performances, the whole series was played in a convivial manner, and the Australians, suitably impressed by Worrell, named the trophy after him.

Winning the first and third Tests of the 1964–65 series, the West Indians took the trophy to the Caribbean for the first time. The following three series were all won by Australia, with the 1975–76 series ending 5–1. The West Indies sole Test victory in the latter series, at the WACA Ground in Perth, was by an innings and 87 runs. It featured an explosive innings from West Indian batsman Roy Fredericks who struck 169 from 145 deliveries and was described by former batsman Lindsay Hassett as the "greatest innings I've seen in Australia". The 1977–78 series saw the beginning of fifteen years of West Indian dominance in the trophy, but it was not without controversy. The first two Tests of that series were completed within three days, the second being notable for Graham Yallop becoming the first batsman to wear a helmet at the crease. With the West Indies team departing to join Kerry Packer's World Series Cricket as the World Series Cricket West Indies XI, Australia managed a victory against the second-string team in the third Test but were beaten by 198 runs in the fourth. The final Test saw the West Indies eight wickets down with more than 100 runs needed when Vanburn Holder was dismissed. Although the decision was legitimate, Holder's reaction on the way back to the pavilion was interpreted otherwise, and the Jamaican crowds began to riot. The match was abandoned, and with two of the three umpires refusing to consider a sixth day's play, the result was declared a draw. The 1981–82 series was drawn overall, with one victory each and one draw, thus the West Indies retained the trophy.

After drawing the first two Tests of the 1983–84 series, the West Indies swept the Australians aside, winning the remaining Tests, two by ten wickets and one by an innings and 36 runs. They continued their good form in the following series in Australia, with dominant wins in the first three Tests, losing the final Test (a dead rubber at that point) to secure the trophy with a 3–1 victory. The West Indies were consistently superior over the next three series, winning seven Test matches to Australia's three, thereby holding the Frank Worrell Trophy from 1978 to 1993. The final and deciding Test of the 1992–93 series saw Curtly Ambrose take seven wickets for one run in 32 deliveries, reducing Australia from 85 for 2 to 119 all out. For the 1994–95 series, the West Indies brought in a new coach and a new manager. Despite a fourth wicket stand of 124 between Brian Lara and Carl Hooper after the West Indies had been reduced to 6 runs for 3 wickets, Australia secured a ten-wicket victory inside three days. A draw in the second Test was followed by a nine-wicket victory for the West Indies in the third. The fourth and final Test was later referred to as "make or break for both teams" by the Australian bowler Paul Reiffel. Although Richie Richardson scored a century in the first innings, this was overshadowed by the Waugh brothers – Mark made 126 while Steve scored 200; together they shared a 231-run fourth wicket stand to push Australia to a formidable total.

Australia made it back-to-back series wins with a 3–2 victory in 1996–97, yet could only draw the series in the West Indies in 1998–99. However, the 2000–01 series saw the emergence of a commanding Australian Test team, who would go undefeated against the West Indies until 2024. That series saw the Australians whitewash the Caribbeans, winning 5–0, the first such result since the West Indies toured Australia and New Zealand in 1930–31. The defeat was unsurprising; the West Indies had been whitewashed in their previous three Test series, in Pakistan, South Africa and New Zealand. Australia took the 2003 series 3–1, and won the following seven series without losing a Test, including three more whitewashes in the 2005–06 series, 2015 series and 2022–23 series. The second Test of the 2023–24 series at the Gabba saw Australia's record undefeated run come to an end where the West Indies won by 8 runs. Overall, Australia have won 50 of the 105 Test matches played for the Frank Worrell Trophy, with the West Indies winning 31.

== List of Test series ==
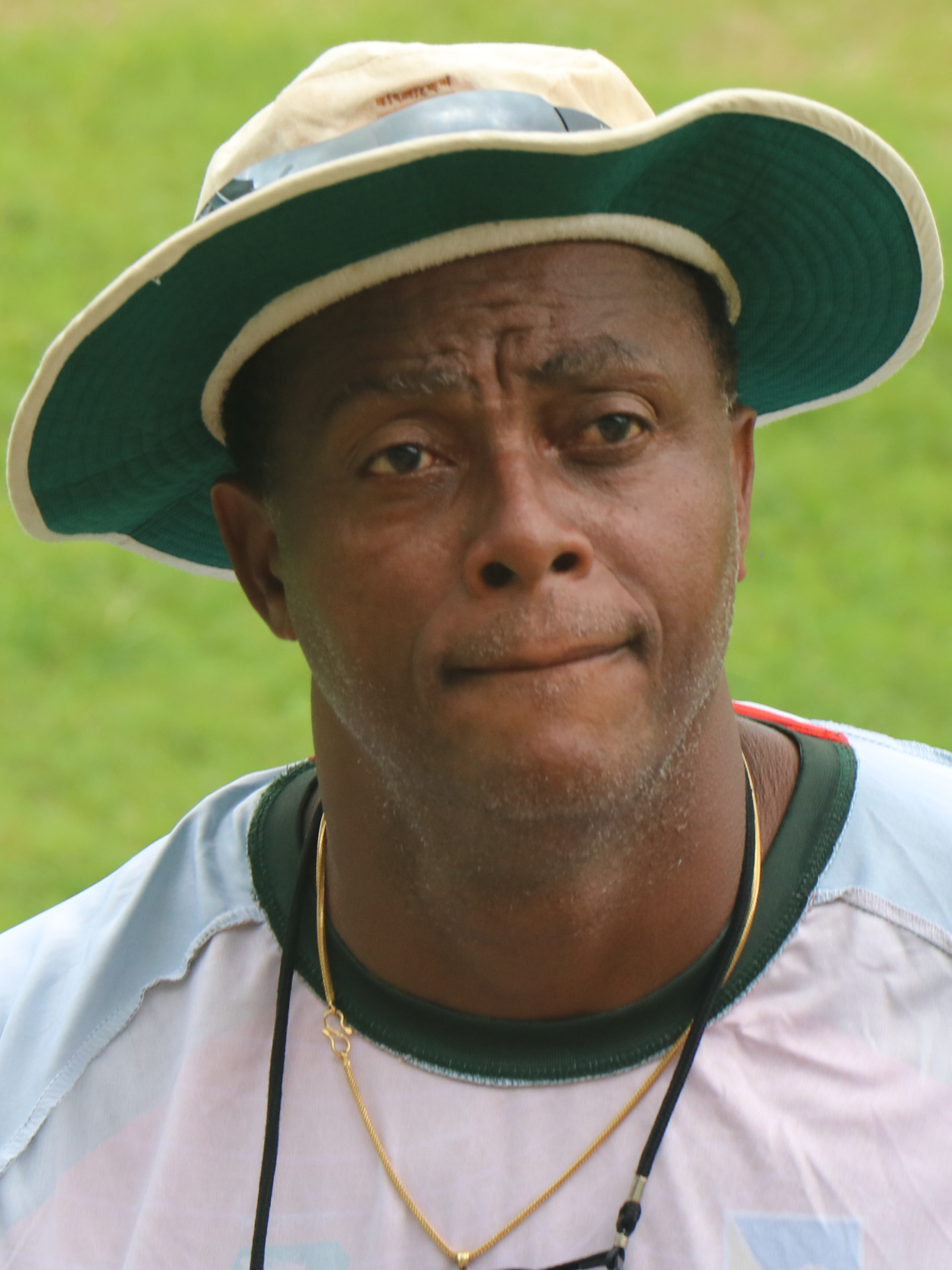
Courtney Walsh is the series' leading wicket-taker.

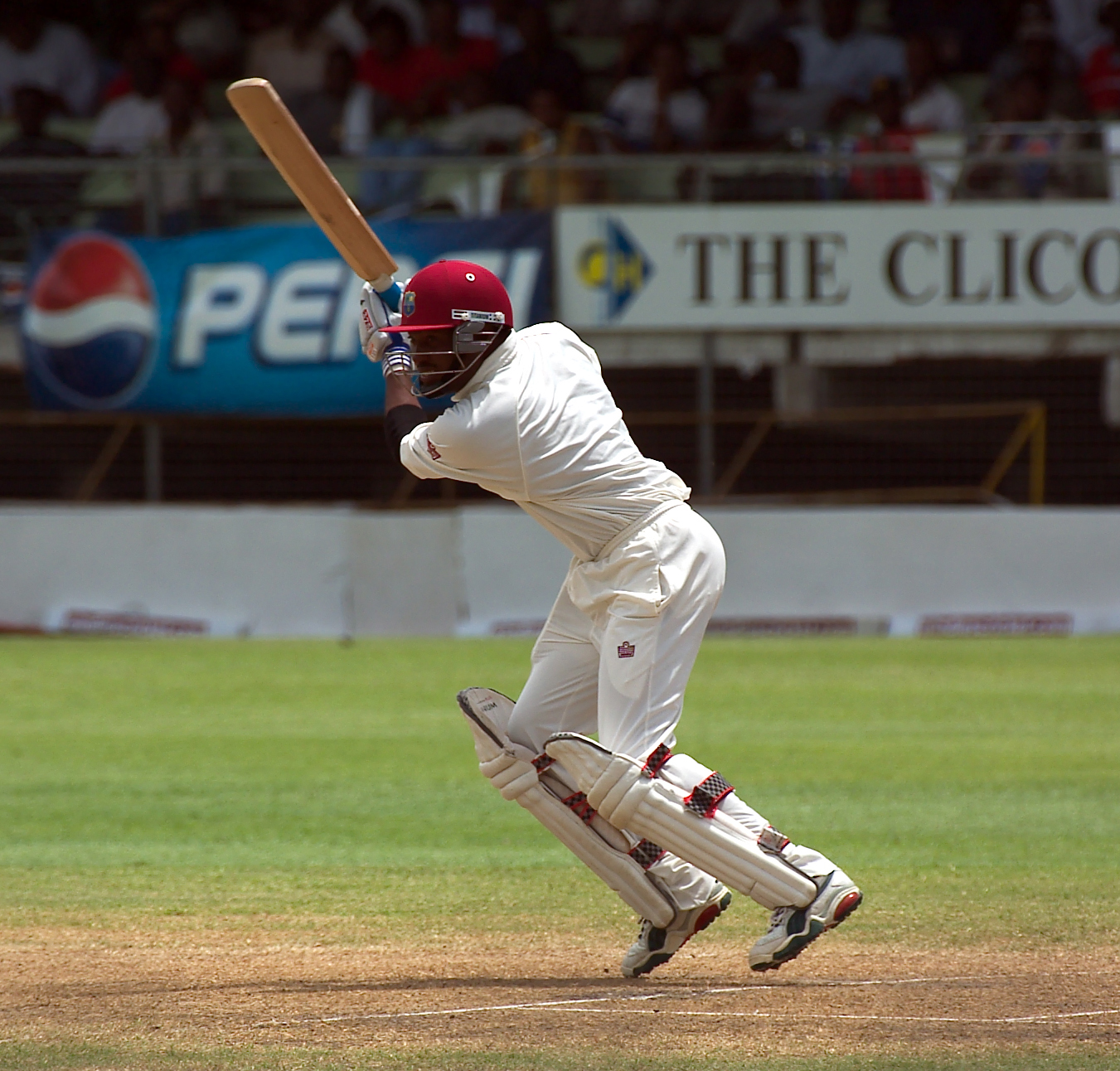
Brian Lara is the trophy's top scorer.

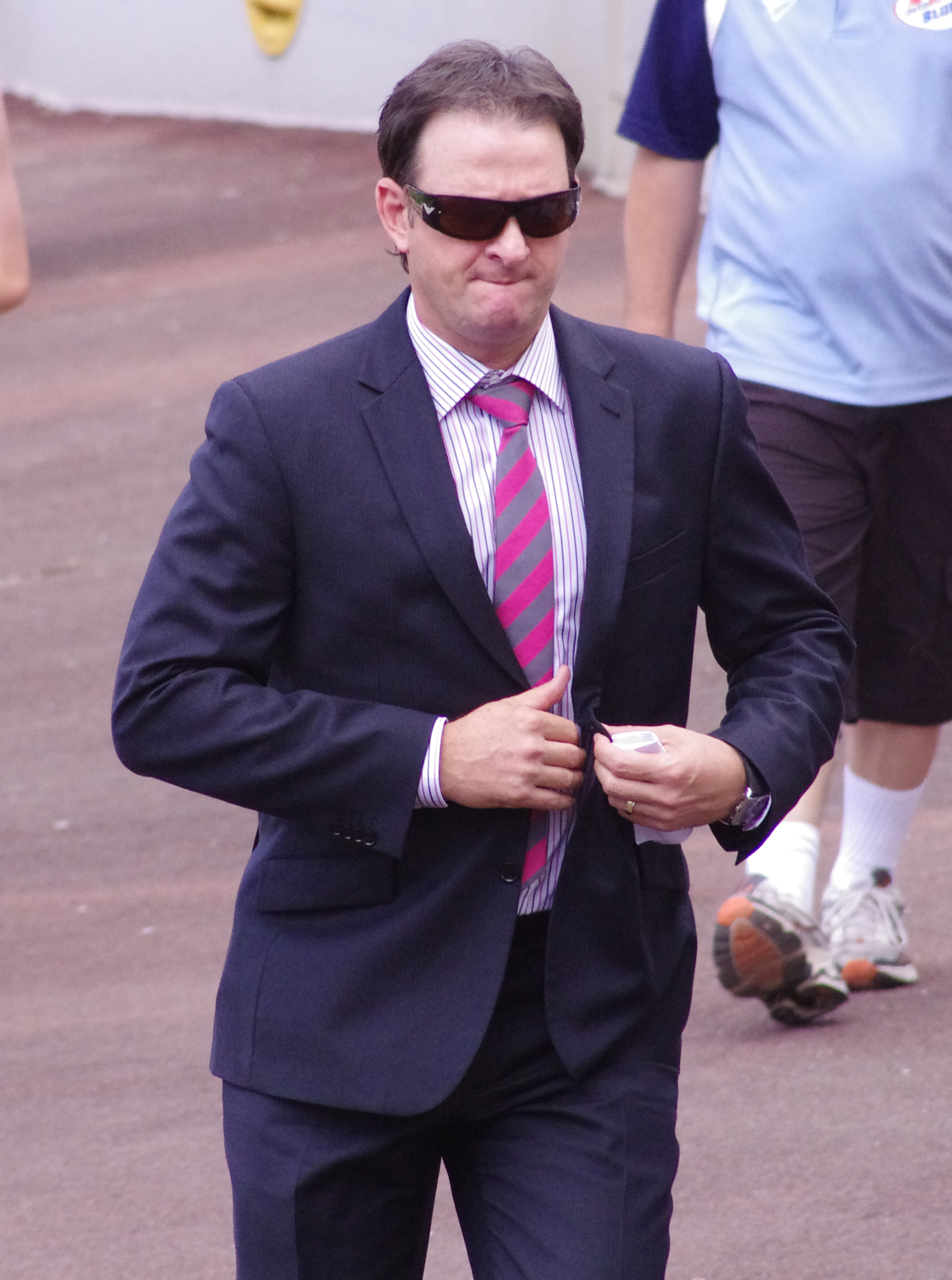
Mark Waugh is the most successful fielder in the history of the trophy, with 45 catches.

Statistics correct as of the end of the 2023–24 series.

| Series | Season | Host | First match | Tests | Australia | West Indies | Drawn | Result | Holder | Ref |
|---|---|---|---|---|---|---|---|---|---|---|
| 1 | 1960–61 | Australia | 9 December 1960 | 5 | 2 | 1 | 1 ‡ | Australia | Australia | |
| 2 | 1964–65 | West Indies | 3 March 1965 | 5 | 1 | 2 | 2 | West Indies | West Indies | |
| 3 | 1968–69 | Australia | 6 December 1968 | 5 | 3 | 1 | 1 | Australia | Australia | |
| 4 | 1972–73 | West Indies | 16 February 1973 | 5 | 2 | 0 | 3 | Australia | Australia | |
| 5 | 1975–76 | Australia | 28 November 1975 | 6 | 5 | 1 | 0 | Australia | Australia | |
| 6 | 1977–78 | West Indies | 3 March 1978 | 5 | 1 | 3 | 1 | West Indies | West Indies | |
| 7 | 1979–80 | Australia | 1 December 1979 | 3 | 0 | 2 | 1 | West Indies | West Indies | |
| 8 | 1981–82 | Australia | 26 December 1981 | 3 | 1 | 1 | 1 | drawn | West Indies | |
| 9 | 1983–84 | West Indies | 2 March 1984 | 5 | 0 | 3 | 2 | West Indies | West Indies | |
| 10 | 1984–85 | Australia | 9 November 1984 | 5 | 1 | 3 | 1 | West Indies | West Indies | |
| 11 | 1988–89 | Australia | 18 November 1988 | 5 | 1 | 3 | 1 | West Indies | West Indies | |
| 12 | 1990–91 | West Indies | 1 March 1991 | 5 | 1 | 2 | 2 | West Indies | West Indies | |
| 13 | 1992–93 | Australia | 27 November 1992 | 5 | 1 | 2 | 2 | West Indies | West Indies | |
| 14 | 1994–95 | West Indies | 31 March 1995 | 4 | 2 | 1 | 1 | Australia | Australia | |
| 15 | 1996–97 | Australia | 22 November 1996 | 5 | 3 | 2 | 0 | Australia | Australia | |
| 16 | 1998–99 | West Indies | 5 March 1999 | 4 | 2 | 2 | 0 | drawn | Australia | |
| 17 | 2000–01 | Australia | 23 November 2000 | 5 | 5 | 0 | 0 | Australia | Australia | |
| 18 | 2003 | West Indies | 10 April 2003 | 4 | 3 | 1 | 0 | Australia | Australia | |
| 19 | 2005–06 | Australia | 3 November 2005 | 3 | 3 | 0 | 0 | Australia | Australia | |
| 20 | 2008 | West Indies | 22 May 2008 | 3 | 2 | 0 | 1 | Australia | Australia | |
| 21 | 2009–10 | Australia | 26 November 2009 | 3 | 2 | 0 | 1 | Australia | Australia | |
| 22 | 2011–12 | West Indies | 7 April 2012 | 3 | 2 | 0 | 1 | Australia | Australia | |
| 23 | 2015 | West Indies | 3 June 2015 | 2 | 2 | 0 | 0 | Australia | Australia | |
| 24 | 2015–16 | Australia | 10 December 2015 | 3 | 2 | 0 | 1 | Australia | Australia | |
| 25 | 2022–23 | Australia | 30 November 2022 | 2 | 2 | 0 | 0 | Australia | Australia | |
| 26 | 2023–24 | Australia | 17 January 2024 | 2 | 1 | 1 | 0 | drawn | Australia | |
| 27 | 2025 | West Indies | 25 June 2025 | 3 | 3 | 0 | 0 | Australia | Australia | |

- ‡ – one Test match was tied.

== Results ==
Totals up to and including the 2025 series in West Indies
| | Played | Won by Australia | Won by the West Indies | Drawn |
|---|---|---|---|---|
| Tests | 108 | 53 (48%) | 31 (30%) | 24 (23%) ‡ |
| Series | 27 | 16 (58%) | 8 (31%) | 3 (12%) |

- ‡ – one Test match was tied.
