= West Indian cricket team in Australia in 2000–01 =

Cricket tour

The West Indies cricket team toured Australia in the 2000–01 cricket season. They played five Test matches against Australia, and also competed in a triangular One Day International series that also involved Zimbabwe.

== Test series ==
Australia won the Frank Worrell Trophy 5–0, the first time the West Indies had been whitewashed by Australia since the 1930–31 series.

=== 1st Test ===
23–25 November 2000
Scorecard

West Indies	v	Australia
82 (49.1 overs); Daren Ganga 20 (104); Glenn McGrath 6/17 (20 overs)		332 (114.4 overs); Brett Lee 62* (80); Marlon Black 4/83 (28 overs)
124 (58 overs); Shivnarine Chanderpaul 62* (157); Glenn McGrath 4/10 (13 overs)

Australia won by an innings and 126 runs
The Gabba, Brisbane
Umpires: Doug Cowie (NZ) and Daryl Harper (Aus)
Player of the match: Glenn McGrath (Aus)

- Australia won the toss and elected to field.
- Marlon Black (WI) made his Test debut.

=== 2nd Test ===
1–3 December 2000
Scorecard

West Indies	v	Australia
196 (61 overs); Ridley Jacobs 96* (151); Jason Gillespie 3/46 (12 overs)		396/8d (108 overs); Mark Waugh 119 (175); Courtney Walsh 2/74 (31 overs)
173 (66 overs); Wavell Hinds 41 (82); Brett Lee 5/61 (15 overs)

Australia won by an innings and 27 runs
WACA Ground, Perth
Umpires: John Hampshire (Eng) and Peter Parker (Aus)
Player of the match: Mark Waugh (Aus)

- Australia won the toss and elected to field.
- Glenn McGrath took his 300th Test wicket during a hat-trick in West Indies' first innings. WATCH

=== 3rd Test ===
15–19 December 2000
Scorecard

West Indies	v	Australia
391 (128.5 overs); Brian Lara 182 (235); Colin Miller 5/81 (35.5 overs)		403 (127.4 overs); Ricky Ponting 92 (156); Mervyn Dillon 3/84 (24.4 overs)
141 (51.5 overs); Brian Lara 39 (38); Colin Miller 5/32 (17 overs)		130/5 (43 overs); Justin Langer 48 (118); Mervyn Dillon 3/42 (12 overs)

Australia won by 5 wickets
Adelaide Oval, Adelaide
Umpires: Steve Davis (Aus) and Srinivas Venkataraghavan (Ind)
Player of the match: Colin Miller (Aus)

- West Indies won the toss and elected to bat.
- Marlon Samuels (WI) made his Test debut.

=== 4th Test ===
26–29 December 2000
Scorecard

Australia	v	West Indies
364 (114 overs); Steve Waugh 121* (237); Mervyn Dillon 4/76 (21 overs)		165 (57.3 overs); Marlon Samuels 60* (123); Andy Bichel 5/60 (13.3 overs)
262/5d (77 overs); Justin Langer 80 (164); Jimmy Adams 2/43 (18 overs)		109 (49.3 overs); Marlon Samuels 46 (108); Jason Gillespie 6/40 (17 overs)

Australia won by 352 runs
Melbourne Cricket Ground, Melbourne
Umpires: Simon Taufel (Aus) and Srinivas Venkataraghavan (Ind)
Player of the match: Steve Waugh (Aus)

- West Indies won the toss and elected to field.
- Colin Stuart (WI) made his Test debut.
- Ridley Jacobs (WI) equalled the record of taking seven dismissals in a Test innings as the designated wicket-keeper.

=== 5th Test ===
2–6 January 2001
Scorecard

West Indies	v	Australia
272 (102.1 overs); Sherwin Campbell 79 (162); Stuart MacGill 7/104 (37 overs)		452 (135.4 overs); Steve Waugh 103 (238); Mahendra Nagamootoo 3/119 (35 overs)
352 (116.5 overs); Mahendra Nagamootoo 68 (99); Colin Miller 4/102 (32.5 overs)		174/4 (44.5 overs); Michael Slater 86* (129); Marlon Samuels 1/26 (5.5 overs)

Australia won by 6 wickets
Sydney Cricket Ground, Sydney
Umpires: Darrell Hair (Aus) and Rudi Koertzen (SA)
Player of the match: Michael Slater (Aus)

- West Indies won the toss and elected to bat.

== One Day series ==
The one day series, sponsored by Carlton & United Beverages, was played between Australia, Zimbabwe and the West Indies. The West Indies and Australia qualified for the finals, in which Australia won the first two matches in Melbourne and Sydney. Hence a deciding final match was not required.
