= Robert Samuel Langer =

Robert Samuel Langer may refer to:

- Rob Langer (born 1948), Australian cricketer
- Robert S. Langer (born 1948), American chemical engineer and scientist
