= Australian cricket team in the West Indies in 1994–95 =

International cricket tour

The Frank Worrell Trophy 1994-95
| | Australia | West Indies |
- Dates: 8 March – 3 May 1995
| Captains | Mark Taylor (Tests and ODIs) | Richie Richardson |

Test series
- Result: Australia won the 4-match series 2–1
| Most runs | Steve Waugh (429) | Brian Lara (308) |
| Most wickets | Glenn Mcgrath (17) | Courtney Walsh (20) |
- Player of the series: Steve Waugh (Aus)

One Day International series
- Results: West Indies won the 5-match series 4–1
| Most runs | Michael Slater (186); David Boon (170) | Carl Hooper (290); Brian Lara (256) |
| Most wickets | Paul Reiffel (7) | Courtney Walsh (7) |
- Player of the series: Carl Hooper (WI)

The Australia national cricket team toured the Caribbean between March and May of 1995 and played a four-match Test series against the West Indies cricket team, winning the series 2–1 with one match drawn. Australia's victory was historic, with it being the first time the West Indies had lost a Test series in 15 years. The Australians also played a five match series of limited overs international matches against West Indies and three additional first-class matches.

== ODI series summary ==
West Indies won the series 4–1.

=== 1st ODI ===
8 March 1995
Scorecard

| West Indies; 257 (49.4 overs) | v | Australia; 251/6 (50 overs) |
| CL Hooper 84 (84); CJ McDermott 3/25 (10 overs) | | DC Boon 85* (85); CA Walsh 2/52 (10 overs) |

West Indies won by 6 runs
Kensington Oval, Bridgetown, Barbados
Umpires: LH Barker and DO Holder
Player of the match: CL Hooper (WI)

- West Indies won the toss and elected to bat.
- VC Drakes (WI) made his ODI debut.

=== 2nd ODI ===
11 March 1995
Scorecard

| Australia; 260/8 (50 overs) | v | West Indies; 234 (47.5 overs) |
| SR Waugh 58 (58); WKM Benjamin 2/49 (10 overs) | | BC Lara 62 (71); PR Reiffel 3/32 (10 overs) |

Australia won by 26 runs
Queen's Park Oval, Port of Spain, Trinidad
Umpires: SA Bucknor and CE Cumberbatch
Player of the match: IA Healy (AUS)

- Australia won the toss and elected to bat.

=== 3rd ODI ===
12 March 1995
Scorecard

| West Indies; 282/5 (50 overs) | v | Australia; 149 (34.5 overs) |
| BC Lara 139 (123); SR Waugh 2/61 (9.3 overs) | | SR Waugh 44 (45); PV Simmons 4/18 (4.5 overs) |

West Indies won by 133 runs
Queen's Park Oval, Port of Spain, Trinidad
Umpires: SA Bucknor and CE Cumberbatch
Player of the match: BC Lara (WIN)

- West Indies won the toss and elected to bat.

=== 4th ODI ===
15 March 1995
Scorecard

| Australia; 210/9 (48 overs) | v | West Indies; 208/3 (43.1 overs) |
| MJ Slater 68 (108); CA Walsh 3/30 (9 overs) | | PV Simmons 86 (110); SK Warne 2/33 (9.1 overs) |

West Indies won by 7 wickets (Run rate)
Arnos Vale Stadium, Kingstown, Saint Vincent and the Grenadines
Umpires: LH Barker and GT Johnson
Player of the match: PV Simmons (WI)

- Australia won the toss and elected to bat.
- The match was reduced from 50 to 48 overs per side.
- The West Indies target was reduced to 211 from 47 overs, and then to 206 from 46 overs.

=== 5th ODI ===
18 March 1995
Scorecard

| Australia; 286/9 (50 overs) | v | West Indies; 287/5 (47.2 overs) |
| ME Waugh 70 (58); CL Hooper 3/36 (10 overs) | | PV Simmons 70 (63); PR Reiffel 2/48 (10 overs) |

West Indies won by 5 wickets
Bourda, Georgetown, Guyana
Umpires: CR Duncan and EA Nicholls
Player of the match: CL Hooper (WI)

- Australia won the toss and elected to bat.

== Test series summary ==
=== 1st Test ===
31 March–2 April 1995
(5-day match)
Scorecard

| West Indies | v | Australia |
| 195 (48.1 overs); BC Lara 65 (112); BP Julian 4/36 (12 overs) | | 346 (100.2 overs); IA Healy 74* (121); WKM Benjamin 3/71 (23.2 overs) |
| 189 (71.3 overs); JC Adams 39* (121); GD McGrath 5/68 (22 overs) | | 39/0 (6.5overs); MJ Slater 20* (19) |

Australia won by 10 wickets
Kensington Oval, Bridgetown, Barbados
Umpires: LH Barker (WI) and S Venkataraghavan (IND)
Player of the match: GD McGrath (AUS)

- West Indies won the toss and elected to bat.
- The match was scheduled for five days but completed in three.

=== 2nd Test ===
8–13 April 1995
(5-day match)
Scorecard

| Australia | v | West Indies |
| 216 (68.3 overs); MJ Slater 41 (85); CA Walsh 6/54 (21.3 overs) | | 260 (81.1 overs); BC Lara 88 (102); PR Reiffel 3/53 (17 overs) |
| 300/7d (108 overs); DC Boon 67 (115); CA Walsh 3/92 (36 overs) | | 80/2 (30 overs); BC Lara 43 (77); PR Reiffel 1/12 (6 overs) |

Match drawn
Antigua Recreation Ground, St. John's, Antigua and Barbuda
Umpires: SA Bucknor (WI) and DR Shepherd (ENG)
Player of the match: CA Walsh (WI)

- West Indies won the toss and elected to field.
- 11 April was taken as a rest day.

=== 3rd Test ===
21–23 April 1995
(5-day match)
Scorecard

| Australia | v | West Indies |
| 128 (47 overs); SR Waugh 63* (101); CEL Ambrose 5/45 (16 overs) | | 136 (59.5 overs); JC Adams 42 (101); GD McGrath 6/47 (21.5 overs) |
| 105 (36.1 overs); MA Taylor 30 (62); CEL Ambrose 4/20 (10.1 overs) | | 98/1 (20.5 overs); SC Williams 42 (56); ME Waugh 1/9 (2 overs) |

West Indies won by 9 wickets
Queen's Park Oval, Port of Spain, Trinidad and Tobago
Umpires: CE Cumberbatch (WI) and DR Shepherd (ENG)
Player of the match: CEL Ambrose (WI)

- West Indies won the toss and elected to field.
- The match was scheduled for five days but completed in three.

=== 4th Test ===
29 April–3 May 1995
(5-day match)
Scorecard

| West Indies | v | Australia |
| 265 (85.4 overs); RB Richardson 100 (222); PR Reiffel 3/48 (13.4 overs) | | 531 (160.5 overs); SR Waugh 200 (425); CA Walsh 3/103 (33 overs) |
| 213 (69.4 overs); WKM Benjamin 51 (118); PR Reiffel 4/47 (18 overs) |

Australia won by an innings and 53 runs
Sabina Park, Kingston, Jamaica
Umpires: SA Bucknor (WI) and KE Liebenberg (SA)
Player of the match: SR Waugh (AUS)

- West Indies won the toss and elected to bat.
- 2 May was taken as a rest day.
- The match was scheduled for five days but completed in four.
- CO Browne (WI) made his Test debut.
