= Xavier Bartlett =

Australian cricketer (born 1998)

Personal information
- Full name: Xavier Colin Bartlett
- Born: 17 December 1998 (age 27); Adelaide, South Australia
- Height: 1.89 m (6 ft 2 in)
- Batting: Right-handed
- Bowling: Right-arm fast-medium
- Role: Bowler

International information
- National side: Australia (2023–present)
- ODI debut (cap 244): 2 February 2024 v West Indies
- Last ODI: 30 September 2026 v South Africa
- ODI shirt no.: 15
- T20I debut (cap 109): 13 February 2023 v West Indies
- Last T20I: 14 June 2026 v Bangladesh

Domestic team information
- Years: Team
- 2016/17: Cricket Australia XI
- 2018/19–present: Queensland
- 2020/21–present: Brisbane Heat
- 2024: Kent
- 2025–present: Punjab Kings
- 2025: San Francisco Unicorns

Career statistics
Competition	ODI	T20I	FC	LA
Matches	12	22	34	34
Runs scored	124	77	844	206
Batting average	13.77	11.00	24.11	12.11
100s/50s	0/2	0/0	0/6	0/2
Top score	52	34*	83	52
Balls bowled	583	411	6,009	1,613
Wickets	23	24	127	47
Bowling average	21.91	22.83	24.01	30.38
5 wickets in innings	0	0	5	0
10 wickets in match	0	0	0	0
Best bowling	4/17	3/13	5/32	4/17
Catches/stumpings	5/–	13/–	29/–	12/–
- Source: Cricinfo, 23 October 2026

Xavier Colin Bartlett (born 17 December 1998) is an Australian international cricketer who represents the Australia national cricket team in One Day International (ODI) and Twenty20 International (T20I) cricket. A right-arm fast-medium bowler, Bartlett plays for Queensland and Brisbane Heat in domestic cricket.

Bartlett represented Australia in the 2018 Under-19 Cricket World Cup. Bartlett played in Queensland's 2020–21 Sheffield Shield season title win and the Brisbane Heat's 2023–24 Big Bash League title win.

== Early life ==
Bartlett was born in Adelaide, South Australia, but moved with his family to the Gold Coast, Queensland, in 2005 at the age of seven. He began playing junior cricket for Surfers Paradise and made his first grade debut for the Gold Coast Dolphins in November 2015 at the age of 17. Bartlett graduated from The Southport School in 2016 as a member of Radcliffe House. While at the school, he represented the school's First XI cricket team in both 2015 and 2016; winning the Westcott Family Trophy for First XI bowler of the year alongside teammate Jack McDonald and played a pivotal role in TSS's 2015 First XI GPS Premiership winning season.

== Domestic career ==
He made his List A cricket debut for the Australian National Performance Squad against India A on 27 August 2016.

He made his first-class cricket debut on 18 October 2019, for Queensland in the 2019–20 Sheffield Shield season. He made his Twenty20 debut on 11 December 2020, for the Brisbane Heat, in the 2020–21 Big Bash League season. In just his second Big Bash League game, Bartlett took three wickets against the Adelaide Strikers.

In the 2023/24 Big Bash Season, Bartlett was the top wicket taker in the tournament taking 20 wickets. This included 2 in the Brisbane Heat's Final victory against the Sydney Sixers. Making him a vital part of the Brisbane Heat's Title win.

In February 2024, Kent County Cricket Club announced that they had signed Bartlett for the first round of County Championship matches and part of the group stage of the Vitality Blast T20 tournament.

== International career ==
In December 2017, he was named in Australia's squad for the 2018 Under-19 Cricket World Cup.

In January 2024, he earned his maiden call-up to Australia's One Day International (ODI) squad for their series against the West Indies, as an injury replacement for Jhye Richardson. He made his debut in the first match of the series. On debut he recorded figures of 4/17 which earned him the Player of the Match. At the time of his debut these are the second best bowling figures recorded for an Australian debutant in ODIs. After being rested for the second match in the series, he returned in the third match taking 4/21. This performance saw him pick up his second player of the match, ultimately earning him the player of the series.

Bartlett made his Twenty20 International debut in February 2024 in the third match of the series against the West Indies at Perth Stadium as a replacement for the injured Josh Hazlewood. He took two wickets in the match.
