= Lloyd Mash =

Australian cricketer (born 1981)

Personal information
- Full name: Lloyd Ryan Mash
- Born: 1 December 1981 (age 44); Melbourne, Victoria, Australia
- Nickname: Bangers
- Height: 1.84 m (6 ft 0 in)
- Batting: Left-handed
- Bowling: Right-arm off-break
- Role: Opening batsman

Domestic team information
- Years: Team
- 2005–2010: Victoria

Career statistics
Competition	FC	LA
Matches	27	6
Runs scored	1,252	48
Batting average	25.04	9.60
100s/50s	0/10	0/0
Top score	94	32
Balls bowled	6	-
Wickets	–	-
Bowling average	–	-
5 wickets in innings	–	-
10 wickets in match	-	-
Best bowling	–	-
Catches/stumpings	16/–	2/–
- Source: Cricinfo, 23 June 2011

Lloyd Ryan Mash (born 1 December 1981 in Melbourne, Victoria) is a former Australian first-class cricketer who played for the Victorian Bushrangers. He was a left-handed top order batsman.

His Junior club was the Eltham Cricket Club. He currently plays in the Victorian Premier Cricket competition for Fitzroy Doncaster Cricket Club and is Captain/Coach.

He was schooled at Eltham High School, earning his VCE in 1999. Like his Bushrangers teammate Nick Jewell, Mash came from a footballing background, having played for Eltham in the Diamond Valley Football League.

Mash had a superb debut season with the Bushrangers scoring 505 Pura Cup runs, although he failed to score a century. His first-class debut was made against the touring West Indian side. He scored 44 in his innings and in a Twenty20 game that they played he hit four sixes off Dwayne Bravo. His Pura Cup career began with 83 against Queensland and he made 94 against South Australia in his next game.
