= Jermaine Lawson =

Jamaican cricketer

Personal information
- Full name: Jermaine Jay Charles Lawson
- Born: 13 January 1982 (age 44); Spanish Town, St. Catherine Parish, Jamaica
- Batting: Right-handed
- Bowling: Right-arm fast-medium
- Role: Bowler

International information
- National side: West Indies
- Test debut (cap 245): 17 October 2002 v India
- Last Test: 3 November 2005 v Australia
- ODI debut: 11 December 2001 v Sri Lanka
- Last ODI: 2 August 2005 v Sri Lanka

Domestic team information
- Years: Team
- 2001: West Indies B
- 2001–2008: Jamaica
- 2008: Leicestershire

Career statistics
Competition	Test	ODI	FC	LA
Matches	13	13	54	34
Runs scored	52	18	434	32
Batting average	3.46	6.00	8.18	3.20
100s/50s	0/0	0/0	0/0	0/0
Top score	14	8	35	8
Balls bowled	2,364	558	8,331	1,579
Wickets	51	17	174	60
Bowling average	29.64	29.29	29.31	19.31
5 wickets in innings	2	0	6	1
10 wickets in match	0	0	0	0
Best bowling	7/78	4/57	7/78	5/66
Catches/stumpings	3/–	0/–	15/–	2/–
- Source: CricketArchive, 23 October 2014

Jermaine Jay Charles Lawson (born 13 January 1982) is a former professional cricketer. A fast bowler from Jamaica, he played at Test and One Day International (ODI) level for the West Indies during the early 2000s, becoming the fourth West Indian to take a Test hat-trick. Lawson later moved to the United States, and made his debut for the American national cricket team at the World Cricket League Division Three tournament in October 2014.

== Career ==
Born in Spanish Town, Jamaica Lawson attended the St Catherine Cricket Club as a youngster. He eventually became a fast bowler capable of bowling over 95 mph. At the age of 20 he made his debut for the West Indies in an away test match against India, picking up the wickets of both Rahul Dravid and Sachin Tendulkar. He went on to claim figures of 6 for 3 against Bangladesh in only his third test match. Lawson later earned a hat-trick, claiming the wickets of Brett Lee, Stuart MacGill and Justin Langer, in an eventual haul of 7/78 during the final Test of Australia's 2003/04 tour of the Caribbean.

He was though soon reported, on 11 May 2003, for a suspect bowling action by the International Cricket Council. After undergoing a period of extensive remedial work, he returned to Test cricket in mid-2004, but stress fractures came to the fore along with another report of his action in July 2005. However, he was eventually cleared by the International Cricket Council on that second report of a suspect bowling action.

On 29 February 2008 Lawson joined English side Leicestershire as a Kolpak player for the upcoming county cricket season. During 2014 Lawson migrated to the United States of America and qualified to play for the USA's cricket team four years later.

== Personal life ==
Lawson is the father of three sons. He currently lives in East New York.
