= West Indian cricket team in Australia in 1996–97 =

International cricket tour

The West Indies cricket team toured Australia in the 1996–97 season and played 5 Test matches against Australia. Australia won the series 3–2. The team also played the 1996–97 Carlton and United Series, a One Day International tournament, against Australia and Pakistan and lost 2–0 to Pakistan in a best of three finals series.

== Test series summary ==
=== First Test ===
22–26 November 1996
(5-day match)
Scorecard

Australia	v	West Indies
479 (151 overs); IA Healy 161* (250); CA Walsh 4/112 (35 overs)		277 (108.1 overs); CL Hooper 102 (228); PR Reiffel 4/58 (24.1 overs)
217/6d (65 overs); ME Waugh 57 (95); IR Bishop 3/49 (13 overs)		296 (106.5 overs); SL Campbell 113 (327); GD McGrath 4/60 (29.5 overs)

Australia won by 123 runs
Brisbane Cricket Ground, Woolloongabba, Brisbane
Umpires: CJ Mitchley (SA) and SG Randell (AUS)
Player of the match: IA Healy (AUS)

- West Indies won the toss and elected to field.
- MTG Elliott and MS Kasprowicz (both AUS) made their Test debuts.

=== Second Test ===
29 November–3 December 1996
(5-day match)
Scorecard

Australia	v	West Indies
331 (119.5 overs); GS Blewett 69 (169); CA Walsh 5/98 (30 overs)		304 (117.2 overs); SL Campbell 77 (155); GD McGrath 4/82 (31 overs)
312/4d (106 overs); MTG Elliott 78 retired hurt (162); IR Bishop 2/54 (20 overs)		215 (69.4 overs); S Chanderpaul 71 (68); SK Warne 4/95 (27.4 overs)

Australia won by 124 runs
Sydney Cricket Ground, Sydney
Umpires: DB Hair (AUS) and DR Shepherd (ENG)
Player of the match: GD McGrath (AUS)

- Australia won the toss and elected to bat.
- JN Gillespie (AUS) made his Test debut.

=== Third Test ===
26–28 December 1996
(5-day match)
Scorecard

Australia	v	West Indies
219 (74.5 overs); GS Blewett 62 (154); CEL Ambrose 5/55 (24.5 overs)		255 (109.1 overs); S Chanderpaul 58 (147); GS McGrath 5/50 (30 overs)
122 (45.5 overs); SR Waugh 37 (87); CEL Ambrose 4/17 (12 overs)		87/4 (23.5 overs); S Chanderpaul 40 (82); GD McGrath 3/41 (9 overs)

West Indies won by 6 wickets
Melbourne Cricket Ground, Melbourne
Umpires: PD Parker (AUS) and S Venkataraghavan (IND)
Player of the match: CEL Ambrose (WI)

- Australia won the toss and elected to bat.
- The match was scheduled for five days but completed in three.

=== Fourth Test ===
25–28 January 1997
(5-day match)
Scorecard

West Indies	v	Australia
130 (47.5 overs); JR Murray 34 (43); MG Bevan 4/31 (9.5 overs)		517 (162.3 overs); ML Hayden 125 (226); CL Hooper 2/86 (31 overs)
204 (69.4 overs); BC Lara 78 (144); MG Bevan 6/82 (22.4 overs)

Australia won by an innings and 183 runs
Adelaide Oval, Adelaide
Umpires: SG Randell (AUS) and DR Shepherd (ENG)
Player of the match: MG Bevan (AUS)

- West Indies won the toss and elected to bat.
- The match was scheduled for five days but completed in four.
- AJ Bichel (AUS) and AFG Griffith (WI) made their Test debuts.

=== Fifth Test ===
1–3 February 1997
(5-day match)
Scorecard

Australia	v	West Indies
243 (80 overs); MG Bevan 87* (164); CEL Ambrose 5/43 (18 overs)		384 (111 overs); BC Lara 132 (183); PR Reiffel 5/73 (26 overs)
194 (47.3 overs); ML Hayden 47 (102); CA Walsh 5/74 (20 overs)		57/0 (10.3 overs); RG Samuels 35* (39)

West Indies won by 10 wickets
WACA Ground, Perth
Umpires: DB Hair (AUS) and P Willey (ENG)
Player of the match: CEL Ambrose (WI)

- Australia won the toss and elected to bat.
- The match was scheduled for five days but completed in three.
- This was the West Indies' last Test win in Australia until 2024 in Brisbane.

== External sources ==
- CricketArchive
