= Jason Gillespie =

Australian cricketer (born 1975)

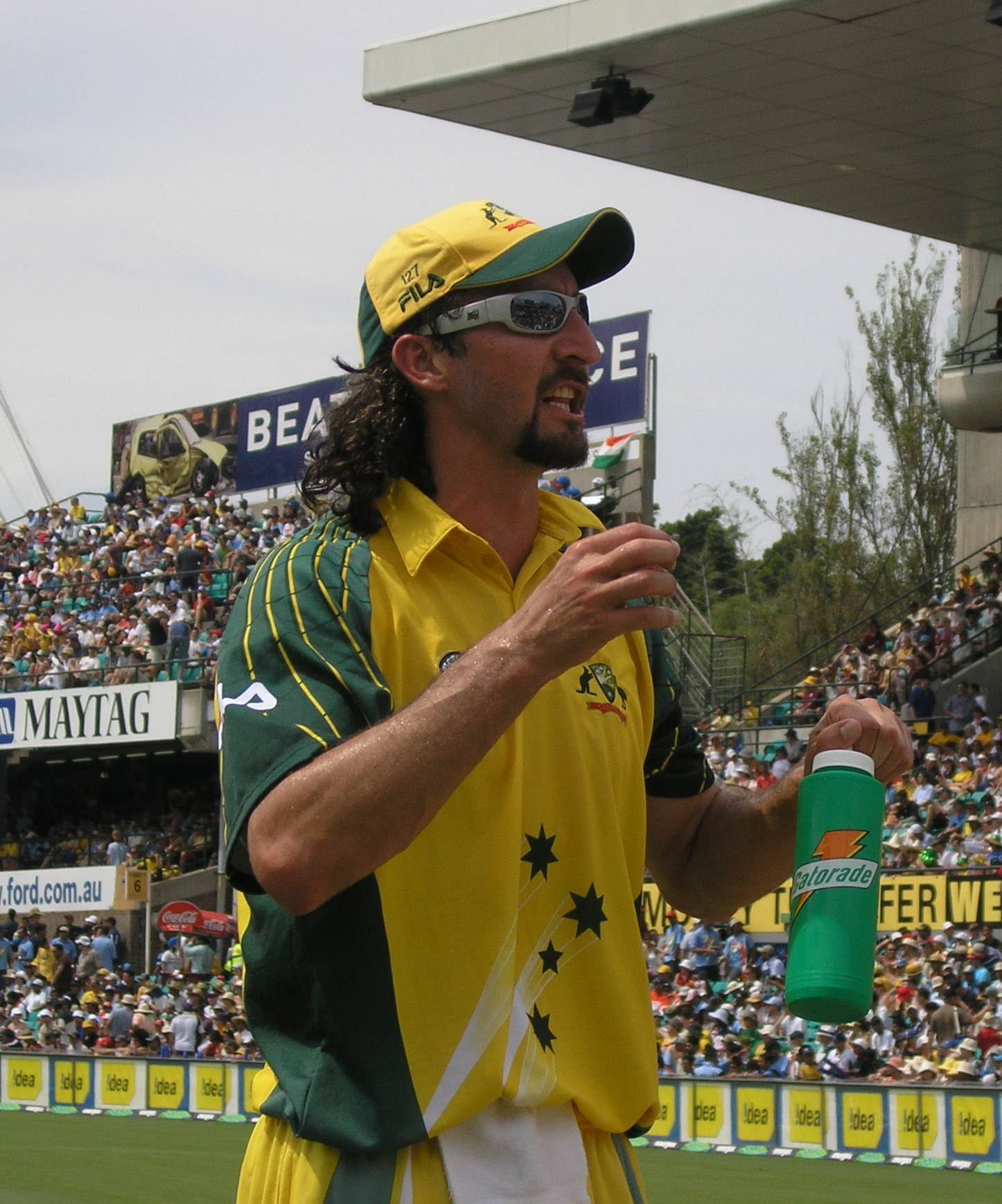
- Gillespie in 2004

Personal information
- Full name: Jason Neil Gillespie
- Born: 19 April 1975 (age 51); Sydney, New South Wales, Australia
- Nickname: Dizzy
- Height: 195 cm (6 ft 5 in)
- Batting: Right-handed
- Bowling: Right-arm fast
- Role: Bowler

International information
- National side: Australia (1996–2006)
- Test debut (cap 370): 29 November 1996 v West Indies
- Last Test: 16 April 2006 v Bangladesh
- ODI debut (cap 127): 30 August 1996 v Sri Lanka
- Last ODI: 12 July 2005 v England
- ODI shirt no.: 4
- Only T20I (cap 12): 13 June 2005 v England

Domestic team information
- Years: Team
- 1994/95–2007/08: South Australia
- 2006–2007: Yorkshire
- 2008: Glamorgan

Head coaching information
- Years: Team
- 2010–2012: Mid West Rhinos
- 2012–2016: Yorkshire
- 2017: Papua New Guinea (interim)
- 2018–2020: Sussex
- 2020–2024: South Australia
- 2024: Pakistan
- 2026-present: Hyderabad Kingsmen

Career statistics
Competition	Test	ODI	FC	LA
Matches	71	97	189	192
Runs scored	1,218	201	3,742	640
Batting average	18.73	12.56	19.59	14.22
100s/50s	1/2	0/0	3/10	0/0
Top score	201*	44*	201*	44*
Balls bowled	14,234	5,144	35,372	10,048
Wickets	259	142	613	255
Bowling average	26.13	25.42	26.98	27.40
5 wickets in innings	8	3	22	3
10 wickets in match	0	0	2	0
Best bowling	7/37	5/22	8/50	5/22
Catches/stumpings	27/–	10/–	68/–	31/–
- Source: ESPNcricinfo, 17 November 2025

Jason Neil Gillespie (born 19 April 1975) is an Australian cricket coach and former international cricketer who played for Australia in all three formats of the game. A right-arm fast bowler, he was also a competent lower-order batsman whose unbeaten 201 in his last Test match is the highest score by a night-watchman in international cricket.

Gillespie made his One Day International debut against Sri Lanka at Colombo in the Singer World Series in August 1996, and his Test debut against the West Indies at Sydney in November 1996. He also played for South Australia, Yorkshire and Glamorgan at first-class level, and was an AIS Australian Cricket Academy scholarship holder in 1995. Gillespie was the first acknowledged Indigenous male cricketer to represent Australia in Test cricket.

Gillespie announced his retirement from first-class cricket in Australia in February 2008. He then played in the unauthorised Indian Cricket League for the Ahmedabad Rockets. At the end of the 2008 English domestic season he retired from all first-class cricket.

== Personal life ==
Jason Gillespie is a descendant on his father's side of the Kamilaroi people of Indigenous Australians, and is the first acknowledged Aboriginal male to become a Test cricketer (the first Indigenous Test cricketer was Faith Thomas in 1958). His mother has Greek heritage and Jason is the eldest of the three children. He attended Cabra Dominican College in Adelaide, South Australia. Gillespie married Anna (née McEvoy) in 2003. The couple have four children. Gillespie has another daughter from a previous relationship.

Gillespie is a vegan and has criticised dairy farming and the use of leather balls. While coaching Yorkshire, Gillespie said of the club being sponsored by a dairy: "Yes, they are a sponsor but it doesn't mean I agree with what they do. It's out of my control, just like the fact that cricket balls are made of leather".

== International career ==
=== Bowling ===
Gillespie took 259 wickets in 71 Tests (at an average of 26.13) making him currently Australia's 11th-highest wicket-taker, and giving him the 14th best bowling average for Australian bowlers who have taken more than a hundred wickets.

Gillespie seldom dominated a Test series (the most wickets he took in a series is 20), but he was a reliable support bowler over several years for his more famous teammates Glenn McGrath and Shane Warne. For his performances in 2004, he was named both in the World Test XI and ODI XI by the ICC.

=== Batting ===
Glenn McGrath (61) and Gillespie (54*) shared a last-wicket stand of 114 against New Zealand in 2004 at the Gabba to the hilarity and acclaim of their teammates. It was the first time that either of them had made a 50 in either Test or ODI versions of the game.

In the second Test against Bangladesh at Chittagong on 19 April 2006, Gillespie (201 not out) set the world record (on his 31st birthday) for the highest individual score by a nightwatchman. This was his maiden first-class century. He also shared a fourth-wicket partnership of 320 runs with Michael Hussey. Gillespie was awarded man-of-the-match honours for his double century in the first innings and he was also named man of the series for his efforts that included eight wickets, at an average of 11.3. Due to injury, it was his final match in international cricket. As of 2025, Gillespie is the only nightwatchman to score a double century in a Test match.

=== Injuries ===
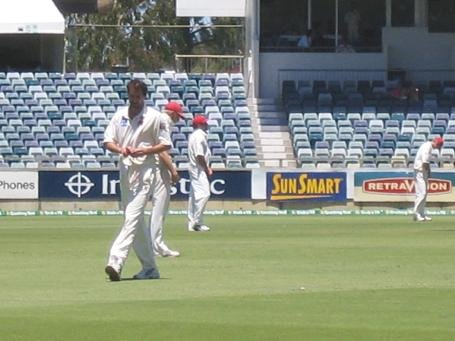
Jason Gillespie preparing to bowl for South Australia against Western Australia in January 2007

He played only 52 from a possible 92 Tests following his debut to his axing during the 2005 Ashes series. Despite these problems, he was both accurate and economical.

In Australia's 1999 tour of Sri Lanka, he was involved in a sickening outfield collision when both he and Steve Waugh were running to take a catch. Waugh was running from the infield towards the outfield, while Gillespie was running in. Waugh dived for the ball resulting in his nose and Gillespie's right leg being broken. The catch was not taken. Gillespie's career was cut short by a shoulder injury while fielding for South Australia, leading to his retirement.

== Coaching career ==
Gillespie became a coach in Zimbabwe in August 2010. He worked primarily with the Mid West Rhinos, but also on "grassroots" activities to improve the performance of young players in Zimbabwe.

Gillespie was drafted in as the bowling coach of Indian Premier League team Kings XI Punjab after their opening match against Pune Warriors in April 2011.

In November 2011, he was named first-team coach of Yorkshire after a shake up in the club's coaching system. In his first season with Yorkshire, they were promoted from Division Two of the County Championship; in the second they were runners-up in the first division; and they won the title in 2014 and 2015, when he was one of the candidates to coach England. He returned to Australia after Yorkshire narrowly missed out on a third successive title in 2016.

In April 2015, Gillespie was named as the coach of the Adelaide Strikers team in the Big Bash League.

In July 2017, Gillespie was appointed as the interim head coach for the Papua New Guinea national team replacing former New Zealand Test player, Dipak Patel.

In 2018, Gillespie took up the position of head coach of Sussex.

In August 2020, Gillespie was appointed the new coach of South Australia.

In 2021, Gillespie was named an Australia Post Legend of Cricket.

=== Pakistan (2024) ===
In April 2024, the Pakistan Cricket Board announced Gillespie as the head coach of the Pakistan men's team in the test cricket for a two-year period. In October 2024, Gillespie was appointed coach of the white ball team on an interim basis following the departure of South Africa's Gary Kirsten. He subsequently led a white-ball tour to Australia in Kirsten's absence, securing victory in the one-day series but losing the T20 series. Aqib Javed replaced him for the following tour to Zimbabwe. On 12 December 2024, he resigned as head coach of Pakistan's Test team.

== Career best performances ==
	Bowling			
	Figures	Fixture	V	
Test	7/37	England v Australia	Headingley, Leeds	1997
ODI	5/22	Australia v Pakistan	Gymkhana Club Ground, Nairobi	2002
T20I	1/49	England v Australia	Rose Bowl, Southampton	2005
FC	8/50	New South Wales v South Australia	SCG, Sydney	2001
LA	5/13	Glamorgan v Warwickshire	Sophia Gardens, Cardiff	2008
T20	2/19	Yorkshire v Derbyshire	Headingley, Leeds	2007

== Recognition ==
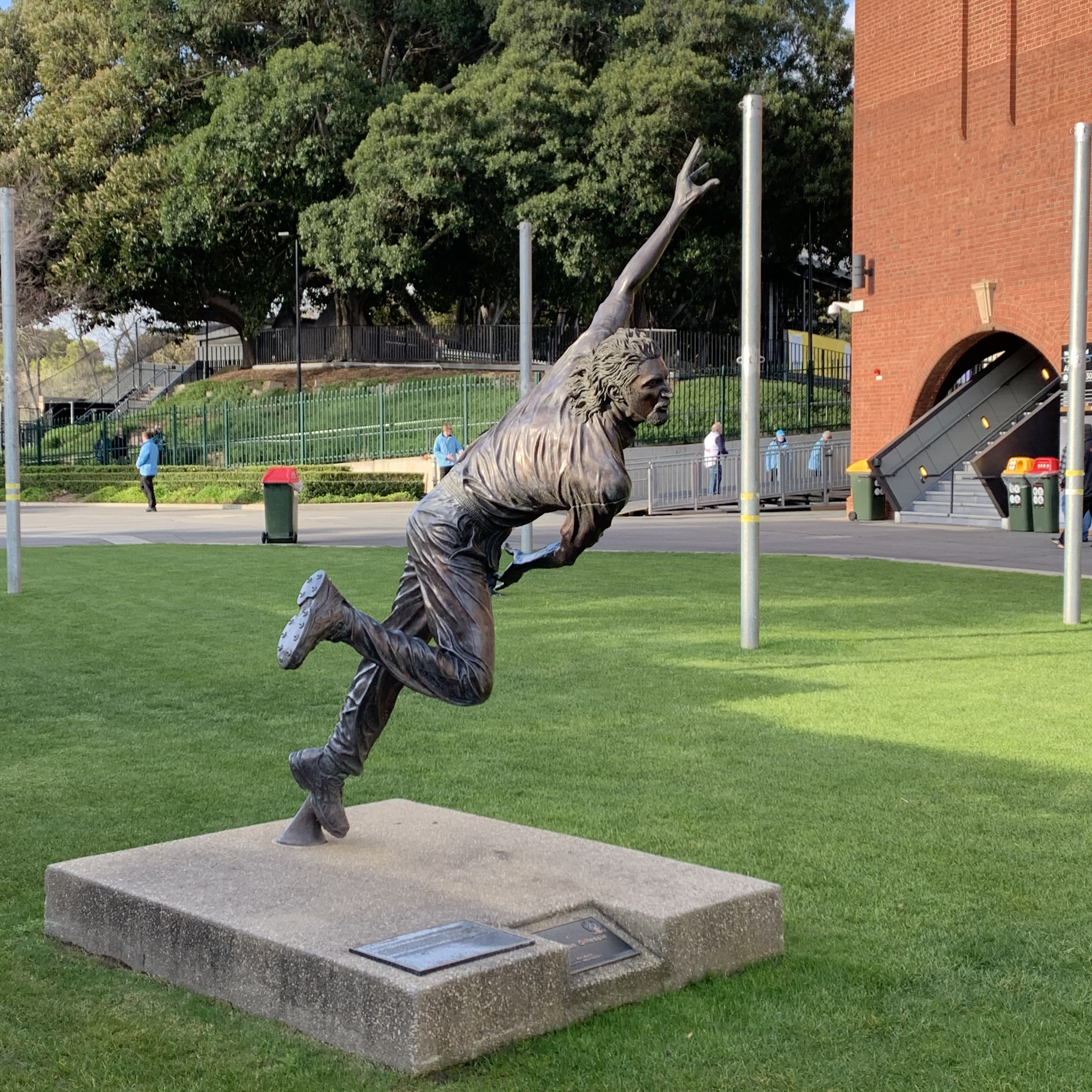
Statue of Gillespie at Adelaide Oval.

A statue of Gillespie, by sculptor Ken Martin was unveiled at the Adelaide Oval in 2010.
