= Corey Collymore =

Barbadian cricketer

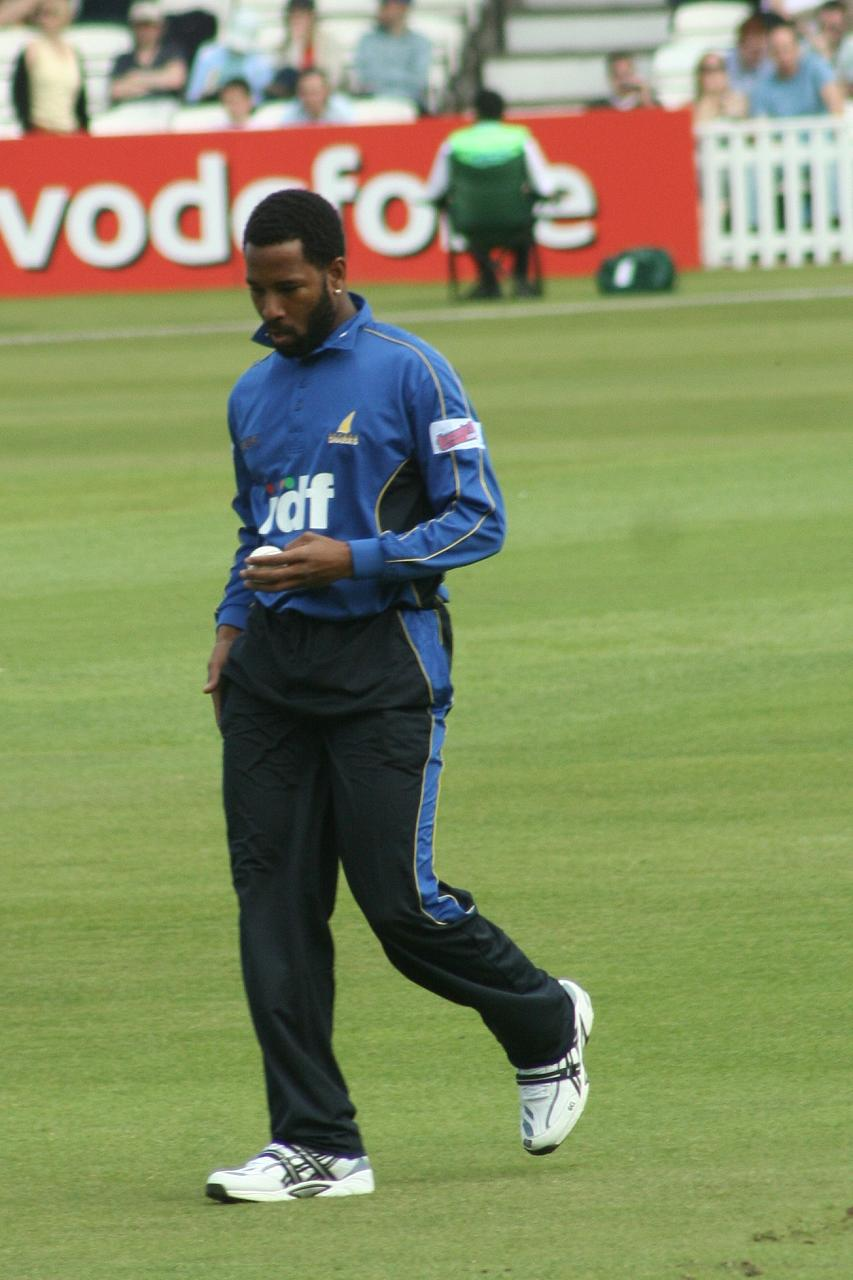

Personal information
- Full name: Corey Dalanelo Collymore
- Born: 21 December 1977 (age 48); Boscobelle, Saint Peter, Barbados
- Batting: Right-handed
- Bowling: Right-arm fast-medium

International information
- National side: West Indies (1999–2007)
- Test debut (cap 230): 3 April 1999 v Australia
- Last Test: 15 June 2007 v England
- ODI debut (cap 96): 11 September 1999 v India
- Last ODI: 21 April 2007 v England

Domestic team information
- Years: Team
- 1998–2009: Barbados
- 2003: Warwickshire
- 2008–2011: Sussex
- 2011–2013: Middlesex

Career statistics
Competition	Test	ODI	FC	LA
Matches	30	84	167	143
Runs scored	197	104	913	156
Batting average	7.88	5.77	7.60	6.00
100s/50s	0/0	0/0	0/0	0/0
Top score	16*	13*	23	13*
Balls bowled	6,337	4,074	28,315	6,564
Wickets	93	83	492	149
Bowling average	32.30	35.22	26.85	31.83
5 wickets in innings	4	1	12	2
10 wickets in match	1	0	2	0
Best bowling	7/57	5/51	7/57	5/27
Catches/stumpings	6/–	12/–	49/–	22/–
Medal record
Men's Cricket
Representing West Indies
ICC Champions Trophy
Winner	2004 England
Runner-up	2006 India
- Source: ESPNcricinfo, 27 November 2023

Corey Dalanelo Collymore (born 21 December 1977) is a former Barbadian cricketer, who represented the West Indies team in both Tests and ODIs cricket as seam bowler. Collymore was a member of the West Indies team that won the 2004 ICC Champions Trophy.

Collymore also played for Barbados, Warwickshire, Sussex and Middlesex in his cricketing career.

== International career ==
Collymore made his test debut for the Windies in 1999 against Australia, where he bowled around the 90 mph mark. He soon suffered a near career ending back injury and was forced to remodel his bowling action. In so doing his pace was reduced though he enhanced his ability to swing and move the ball. He eventually recovered to solely feature in one day internationals for some time. As part of the West Indies' 2003 World Cup campaign, he was recalled to the Test team for the 2003 home series against Sri Lanka. After five wickets in the first innings of the first test in St Lucia, he led the charge in the second innings of the second test at Sabina Park, claiming 7 for 57, in helping the Windies to an eventual seven wicket victory over the Sri Lankans. Collymore was named man of the match and man of the series for his feats with the ball.

He later picked up a career best 11 wickets for the Windies, again at Sabina Park, in the second and final match of the 2005 test series against Pakistan.

== Domestic career ==
In May 2008, Collymore joined Sussex as a Kolpak player in a one-year deal, replacing Australian allrounder Ryan Harris. He took 26 wickets at an average of 27.96 in his first season with the club. He eventually signed a one-year extension with the side for the 2009 season. Collymore then signed another one-year extension with Sussex for the following 2010 season. Collymore was a notable part of the Sussex team that won the 2010 Division 2 County Championship title, claiming 57 wickets at an average of 19.87 in what was eventually his last season with the side.

In September 2010 Collymore joined Middlesex County Cricket Club in a two-year deal to replace fellow Barbadian Pedro Collins. He became a notable player in Middlesex's campaign to successfully win the 2011 Division 2 County Championship title. On 23 September 2013, Collymore went on to receive a guard of honour in what was his final ever appearance for the club. All in all he picked up 86 wickets at an average of 29 in his three seasons with the side.
