= Dalton Holder =

West Indian cricket umpire (born 1953)

Personal information
- Born: 6 March 1953 (age 73); Saint George, Barbados

Umpiring information
- ODIs umpired: 1 (1995)
- Source: Cricinfo, 19 May 2014

Dalton O'Neale Holder (born 6 March 1953) is a Barbadian former cricket umpire. At the international level, the only fixture he officiated in was a One Day International match in 1995.

== See also ==
- List of One Day International cricket umpires
