= Justin Langer =

Australian cricketer and coach (born 1970)

Justin Langer AM
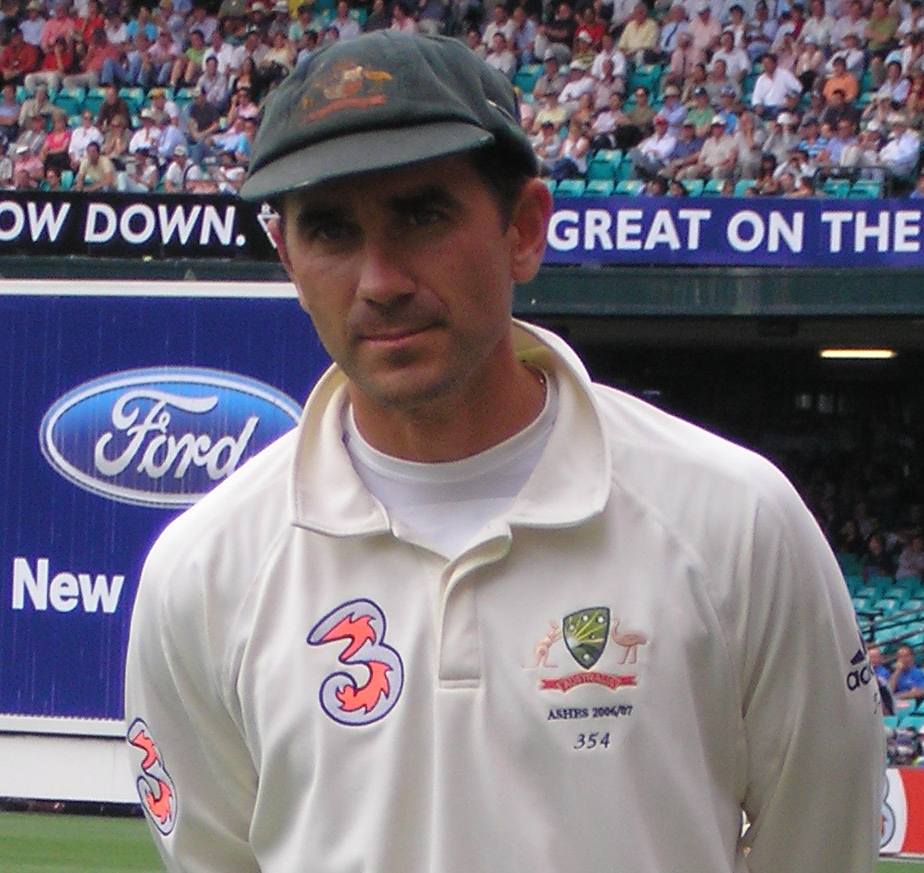
- Langer in 2007

Personal information
- Full name: Justin Lee Langer
- Born: 21 November 1970 (age 55); Perth, Western Australia
- Nickname: JL, Alfie (Note: After the ex-rugby league player Allan Langer.)
- Height: 5 ft 8 in (173 cm)
- Batting: Left-handed
- Bowling: Right-arm medium
- Role: Opening batsman

International information
- National side: Australia (1993–2007)
- Test debut (cap 354): 23 January 1993 v West Indies
- Last Test: 5 January 2007 v England
- ODI debut (cap 117): 14 April 1994 v Sri Lanka
- Last ODI: 25 May 1997 v England

Domestic team information
- Years: Team
- 1991/92–2007/08: Western Australia
- 1998–2000: Middlesex
- 2006–2009: Somerset
- 2009: Rajasthan Royals

Head coaching information
- Years: Team
- 2012–2018: Western Australia
- 2012–2018: Perth Scorchers
- 2018–2022: Australia
- 2023–: Lucknow Super Giants
- 2025: London Spirit

Career statistics
Competition	Test	ODI	FC	LA
Matches	105	8	360	239
Runs scored	7,696	160	28,382	7,875
Batting average	45.27	32.00	50.23	38.60
100s/50s	23/30	0/0	86/110	14/53
Top score	250	36	342	146
Balls bowled	6	0	386	193
Wickets	0	–	5	7
Bowling average	–	–	42.00	30.71
5 wickets in innings	–	–	0	0
10 wickets in match	–	–	0	0
Best bowling	–	–	2/17	3/51
Catches/stumpings	73/–	2/1	322/–	113/2
Medal record
Men's Cricket
Representing Australia (as manager)
T20 World Cup
Winner	2021 UAE & Oman
- Source: ESPNcricinfo, 28 September 2009

Justin Lee Langer AM (born 21 November 1970) is an Australian cricket coach and former cricketer. He is the former coach of the Australia men's national team, having been appointed to the role in May 2018 and leaving in February 2022 and became the coach of Lucknow based IPL franchise Lucknow Super Giants in July, 2023. A left-handed batsman, Langer is best known for his partnership with Matthew Hayden as Australia's test opening batsmen during the early and mid-2000s, considered one of the most successful ever. Representing Western Australia domestically, Langer played English county cricket for Middlesex and also Somerset. He holds the record for the most runs scored at first-class level by an Australian. As Australia's coach, he led the team to victory in the 2021 T20 World Cup.

Born in Perth, Western Australia, Langer excelled at cricket from an early age, representing Western Australia at under-age level, as well as the Australia under-19 team. He also won a scholarship to the Australian Cricket Academy at the Australian Institute of Sport in 1990. Langer made his first-class debut for Western Australia during the 1991–92 Sheffield Shield, and, after good form at state level, made his Test debut for Australia the following season at the age of 22, during the West Indies' 1992–93 tour. Although maintaining his place in the team, he struggled for form, and only made sporadic appearances for Australia until his selection for Australia's 1998–99 tour of Pakistan, in which he scored his first Test century. Establishing himself at number three in the batting order, Langer maintained this role until the 2001 Ashes series. Having been injured for the first four Tests, he replaced Michael Slater as Matthew Hayden's opening partner for the final Test, and scored a century in Australia's innings win. This was the first of three centuries in consecutive matches that secured Langer's position at the top of the order.

Except for injuries, the partnership between Hayden and Langer (with Ricky Ponting moving to Langer's previous position at number three) persisted until Langer's retirement at the conclusion of the 2006–07 Ashes series. Their partnership included a total of 5,655 runs over a period of 113 innings, second only to the partnership between West Indians Gordon Greenidge and Desmond Haynes. Langer's retirement came after several injuries had restricted his batting, including a concussion sustained during Australia's 2005–06 tour of South Africa. Despite having been one of the leading runscorers in Australia's domestic limited-overs competition, he only played eight One Day International matches for Australia, all during a period from 1994 to 1997. After his retirement, Langer played one final season with Western Australia (having served as the state's captain since the 2002–03 season), as well as continuing as captain of Somerset in English domestic cricket. He retired from all forms of the cricket at the end of the 2009 English cricket season. Langer was the Australian national cricket team's batting coach and senior assistant coach from November 2009 until November 2012, when he was appointed senior coach of the Perth Scorchers and Western Australia.

In 2016, Langer became interim coach for the Australian team while then coach Darren Lehmann took leave to scout for the Ashes and away matches late in 2016. In a fan poll conducted by the CA in 2017, he was named in the country's best Ashes XI in the last 40 years.

On 3 May 2018, Langer was announced as coach of the Australian national cricket team, following a ball tampering scandal which led to the resignation of Darren Lehmann. His four-year term began on 22 May 2018.

On 4 February 2022, Langer announced his resignation as head coach of the Australia men's team. His contract was set to expire in June 2022, and he turned down a short-term extension.

== International career ==
=== 1993–2000 ===
Langer made his Test debut against the West Indies at the Adelaide Oval, in January 1993. He received a rough welcome against an in-form West Indian bowling attack, including being hit on the back of the head by his very first ball in Test cricket, delivered by Ian Bishop, who went on to become a close friend in later life. Along with the rest of the Australian team, he took numerous blows from their pace bowlers. After only managing to score 20 in the first innings, Langer top-scored for Australia with 54 in the second, a famous chase by Australia that fell just 2 runs short. In the fifth and final Test of the series, Langer only managed to score 11 runs between his two innings in a match that was dominated by the bowling of Curtly Ambrose and Ian Bishop.

He retained his place for the following tour of New Zealand. After decent but not awe-inspiring totals in the first two Tests (63 & 24), Langer suffered the indignity of getting a pair in the third Test, falling for a duck in both innings. He was subsequently dropped, and other than a few scattered appearances did not return to the Australian Test team until October 1998, for the tour of Pakistan.

In November 1999 at Bellerive Oval in Hobart, he shared a match-winning 238-run partnership with Adam Gilchrist to rescue Australia from 126/5 chasing a victory target of 369 against Pakistan. The century scored in this innings was scored in 388 minutes, an Australian record for the slowest century.

=== 2001–2002 ===
Langer was a number three batsman until 2001 when he was dropped after failing to convert a series of starts during Australia's 2–1 loss in India. During the second Test in Kolkata, he bowled a single over when V. V. S. Laxman and Rahul Dravid defied the Australian attack for the entirety of the fourth day, forcing captain Steve Waugh to try almost all his players as bowlers; it was the only time Langer ever bowled at Test level. Shortly after though, he replaced Michael Slater as an opening batsman for the final 2001 Ashes series Test at The Oval where he celebrated his return with a century. He did not get dropped again and as an opening batsman he averaged 52.38 and scored 14 centuries in 44 matches; previously he scored 7 centuries in 41 matches at an average of 39.04. Langer returned to Australia in the 2002–03 Ashes series, where his very successful partnership with Matthew Hayden developed. In this series, Langer scored his top score of 250 against England at the Melbourne Cricket Ground.

=== 2003–2007 ===
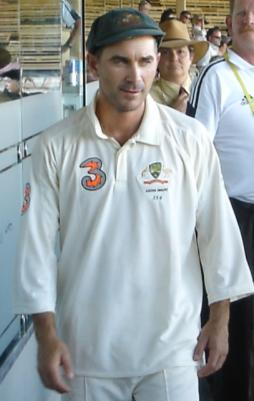
Langer after the 2nd Test vs England, 5 December 2006

Langer personally outscored the entire Pakistan team in the Perth Test of 2004. He scored 191 and 97 while Pakistan made 179 and 72. It was the first occasion of a player being dismissed in both the 190s and 90s in a Test.

He captained the Prime Minister's XI in December 2005 in their match against the West Indies.

In the 2005 Ashes series, Langer top-scored for an unsuccessful Australian team, with 391 in the series. His top score was 105, scored in the final test.

After this, pressure was mounting on the opening partnership of Hayden and Langer. Calls were coming to have the pair replaced by a younger duo, that would ensure the future and stability of the team to come. However, the partnership had support from the Australian selectors and was only disrupted in the 2006 Summer series when Langer was out with injury. He was replaced by Mike Hussey and Phil Jaques for two tests.

Langer then suffered a number of injuries, increasing the pressure on selectors to drop him for rising star Phil Jaques. Langer was selected over Jaques for the 2007 Ashes series, which turned out to be his last. Langer scored an 80 and a century in the first test, but it was slim pickings to follow for him.

Despite success in the Australian Test team, he did not get recalled to the one-day team, even after he was named as the domestic ING Cup's player of the season in 2002/03.

=== Retirement ===
On 1 January 2007, Langer announced his retirement from Test cricket after the fifth Ashes Test against England, starting at the Sydney Cricket Ground the following day. In doing so, he joined Shane Warne and Glenn McGrath who had both announced their retirements earlier in the month, and it came only three matches after the surprise departure of Damien Martyn. He came to the decision during the previous match in Melbourne, having earlier decided against retiring after the tour of South Africa to help Australia reclaim the Ashes. He said of his decision: "Everyone keeps saying 'you'll know when it's time'. Well, at one o'clock two days ago I knew it was time – it just came to me."

Despite his retirement from international cricket, Langer opted to continue to play first-class cricket, with Somerset announcing on the same day that Langer had agreed to return to the English county in 2007 as captain. Langer had said during his retirement announcement that he was relishing returning to Somerset: "There's an amazing challenge at Somerset. They're at the bottom of everything, and I've got a great regard for the coach over there and I'm looking forward to that challenge." Langer also stayed on with Western Australia for a final season in 2007–08.

== List of international centuries ==
Langer scored his first Test century against Pakistan at Peshawar in October 1998, scoring 116. He scored his final Test century against England at The Gabba in November 2006. His highest Test score is 250, scored against England at the Melbourne Cricket Ground in December 2002.

Langer never made a century in the ODI format; his highest score was 36, which he made against India at Sharjah in 1994.

Test centuries
No.	Score	Against	Pos.	Inn.	Test	Venue	H/A/N	Date	Result	Ref
1	116	Pakistan	3	1	2/3	Peshawar	Away	15 October 1998	Drawn	
2	179 not out	England	3	1	3/5	Adelaide	Home	11 December 1998	Won	
3	127	West Indies	3	3	4/4	St. John's	Away	3 April 1999	Won	
4	127	Pakistan	3	4	2/3	Hobart	Home	18 November 1999	Won	
5	144	Pakistan	3	2	3/3	Perth	Home	26 November 1999	Won	
6	223	India	3	2	3/3	Sydney	Home	2 January 2000	Won	
7	122 not out	New Zealand	3	4	3/3	Hamilton	Away	31 March 2000	Won	
8	102 not out	England	2	1	5/5	The Oval	Away	23 August 2001	Won	
9	104	New Zealand	1	1	1/3	Brisbane	Home	8 November 2001	Drawn	
10	123	New Zealand	1	1	2/3	Hobart	Home	22 November 2001	Drawn	
11	116	South Africa	1	1	1/3	Adelaide	Home	14 December 2001	Won	
12	126	South Africa	1	1	3/3	Sydney	Home	2 January 2002	Won	
13	250	England	1	1	4/5	Melbourne	Home	26 December 2002	Won	
14	146	West Indies	1	2	1/4	Georgetown	Away	10 April 2003	Won	
15	111	West Indies	1	3	4/4	St. John's	Away	9 May 2003	Lost	
16	121	India	1	1	1/4	Brisbane	Home	4 December 2003	Drawn	
17	117	India	1	2	4/4	Sydney	Home	2 January 2004	Drawn	
18	166	Sri Lanka	1	3	3/3	Colombo	Away	24 March 2004	Won	
19	162	Sri Lanka	1	1	2/2	Cairns	Home	9 July 2004	Drawn	
20	215	New Zealand	1	1	2/2	Adelaide	Home	26 November 2004	Won	
21	191	Pakistan	1	1	1/3	Perth	Home	16 December 2004	Won	
22	105	England	1	2	5/5	The Oval	Away	8 September 2005	Drawn	
23	100 not out	England	1	3	1/5	Brisbane	Home	23 November 2006	Won	

== Domestic career ==
=== Western Australia ===
Langer was the captain of the Western Warriors until the end of the 2006/2007 season. He became the highest run-scorer for Western Australia in 4-day matches, after passing Tom Moody's old record of 8853 runs on 5 December 2007 against Tasmania at Bellerive Oval. On 5 March 2008, Langer announced his retirement from Australian first-class domestic cricket. Earlier in the year, Langer had announced his retirement from the Australian domestic one-day cricket. However, Langer said that he would play another season for Somerset in county cricket. Langer played for Western Australia in a career spanning 17 years, leaving as the highest run-scorer in Western Australia's history.

=== County Cricket ===
Langer played county cricket for Middlesex County Cricket Club from 1998 to 2000, captaining the team in 2000. In his first season, he scored his maiden century in English domestic cricket in superb fashion with 233 not out against Somerset at Lord's, in the same match that he was awarded his county cap. He went on to score centuries in his next two County Championship matches, and achieved 1,000 runs for the season after only eight matches. He finished the season with the second highest runs total and batting average in the Championship, behind John Crawley on both counts.

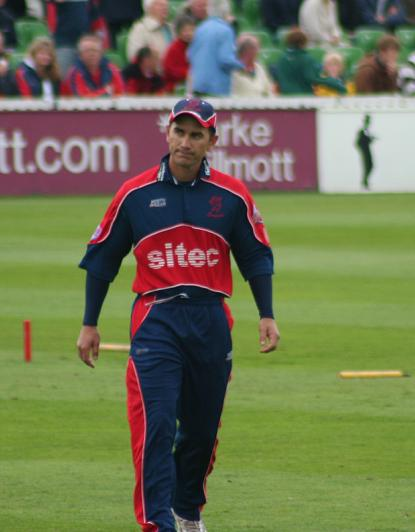
Langer as captain at Somerset, 27 June 2007

In June 2006 it was announced that he would join Somerset later that month for six weeks, while fellow countryman Dan Cullen was on duty with Australia A. On 20 July 2006, he made his highest first-class score of 342 playing for Somerset in a County Championship match against Surrey at the Woodbridge Road ground in Guildford. This was also the highest score ever by a Somerset batsman, breaking the record of Sir Viv Richards who made 322 against Warwickshire at Taunton in 1985, and is the 10th highest score in a first-class match in England. During his six-week spell at the club, Langer also enjoyed particular success in the Twenty20 competition, topping the batting charts along with fellow Australian Cameron White.

On 20 April 2007 he became the first Somerset player to score two triple centuries in the County Championship when he hit 315 against Middlesex in a match noted for its batting. Responding to a Middlesex first innings of 600, Somerset set a new ground record at the County Ground, Taunton with 850–7 declared. On 19 September 2007 it was announced that Langer would stay with Somerset (as captain) for the 2008 season. In 15 first-class matches for the county in 2007, Langer scored 1215 runs at 57.85 and a further 764 in one-day competitions.

Early in the 2008 season, Langer and Marcus Trescothick put on a 272-second wicket partnership during the second innings against Hampshire at the County Ground, Taunton; falling just 18 short of the 1924 ground record.

On 23 July 2009, playing his 615th innings, he surpassed Sir Donald Bradman as the leading Australian first-class run scorer when he scored his 86th century while playing Worcestershire. At the end of the 2009 season, Langer announced that he would not be returning to Taunton in a playing capacity the following season, and retiring from all competitive cricket. He commented in an interview with BBC Somerset that he was in discussions to potentially return at some point to the county in the future in a coaching capacity. Langer played his last home game in English domestic cricket on 27 September 2009, captaining Somerset against Durham in the Nat West Pro40. A game which Somerset lost by two runs. Langer's last act as Somerset captain was to lead the team to the second stage of the 2009 Twenty20 Champions League.

== Career best performances ==
	Batting			
	Score	Fixture	Venue	Season
Test	250	Australia v England	MCG, Melbourne	2002
ODI	36	Australia v India	Sharjah Cricket Stadium	1994
FC	342	Surrey v Somerset	Sports Ground, Woodbridge Road, Guildford	2006
LA	146	Western Australia v South Australia	WACA, Perth	2000
T20	97	Somerset v Northamptonshire	County Ground, Taunton	2006

== Post-playing career ==
Langer through to the end of his career remained publicly undecided about what he wanted to do after his retirement. Speculation hence rose in the media with suggestions of a coaching position with Middlesex, and an open invitation to return to Somerset in some capacity. In November 2009, Cricket Australia announced the appointment of Langer as assistant coach of their Test team under national boss Tim Nielsen, as a batting coach and mentor. In November 2012, Langer was appointed to the position of senior coach of Western Australia and the Perth Scorchers, after the resignation of Lachlan Stevens, with a contract until the end of the 2015–16 season.

In July 2017, Langer was appointed to the board of the West Coast Eagles football club.

In May 2018, Langer was announced as the coach of the Australian national cricket team, and then in October 2019, Andrew McDonald was appointed as his assistant coach. In 2019, he coached Australia to the semi-finals of the 2019 Cricket World Cup, losing to England by 8 wickets. It was noted before the game that Langer had got Australia to walk barefoot around the edge of Edgbaston before the match in a bid to capture "positive energy coming out of the earth".

Langer was announced as the head coach of Lucknow Super Giants in July 2023 replacing Andy Flower.

Langer sat on the board of mining company Mineral Resources as a non-executive director from January 2023 to August 2025.

== Famous duels and partners ==
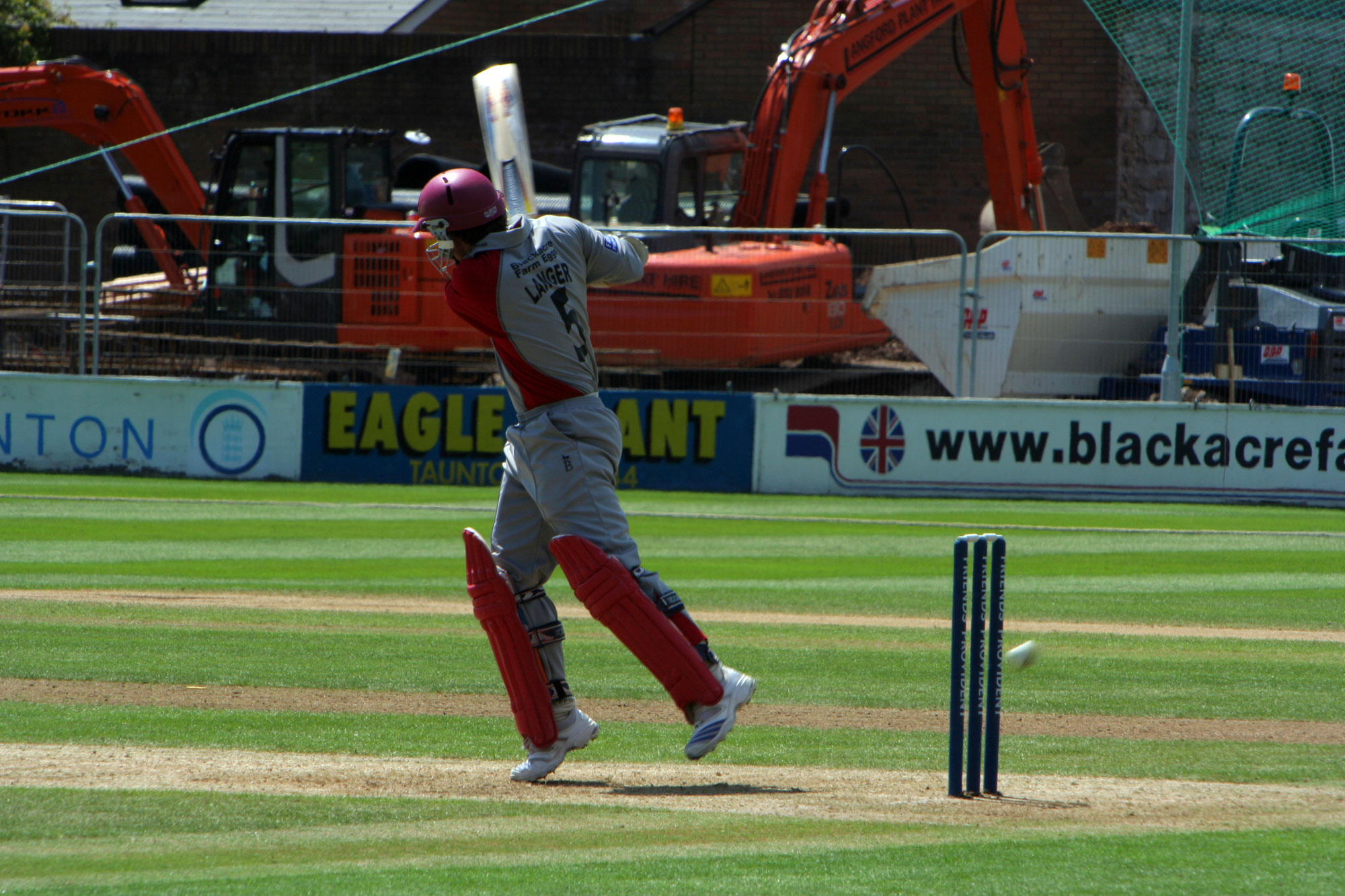
Langer on the attack for Somerset in 2008

In his 100th test, Langer was hit by a bouncer from Makhaya Ntini (South Africa v Australia, 3rd Test, Johannesburg, 2nd day). He suffered concussion and underwent scans in hospital. Despite the risk of being killed if hit on the head again, Langer padded up to bat in the second innings if it was required of him. Captain Ricky Ponting wrote in his diary that because of Langer's intention of defying medical advice, he would have had to declare the run chase and forfeit the match to prevent Langer from facing the bowling. Brett Lee scored the winning runs before Langer was needed.

Langer's most notable opening batting partner was Matthew Hayden. The opening pair represented Australia in more than 100 Test innings. The pair made 5654 runs while batting together in partnerships, with an average of 51 runs per partnership; only Gordon Greenidge and Desmond Haynes of the West Indies have scored more Test runs as a partnership, with 6482.

== Personal life ==
Langer is an alumnus of Perth schools Newman College and Aquinas College. The Justin Langer Shield is played between year sevens of Newman and Aquinas.

He is the nephew of Rob Langer, a left-handed batsman for Western Australia during the 1970s and 1980s. Langer is married to his high school sweetheart, Sue, and has four daughters. When resident in Somerset, the family stayed in a rented home in Hatch Beauchamp: "Mate, I say this with the utmost affection and respect, but it's like living in the olden days."

He is a martial artist and has obtained the rank of Shodan-Ho (probationary 1st degree black belt) in Zen Do Kai.

Langer has written five books. His first was entitled From Outback to Outfield: A Revealing Diary of Life on the County Cricket Circuit. His second, an autobiography released after his return from rock bottom in 2001, entitled The Power of Passion. He also released a book with Steve Harmison entitled Ashes Frontline: The Ashes War Diaries of Steve Harmison and Justin Langer about the 2006–07 Ashes series in Australia. He also wrote Seeing the Sunrise which has been described as "a handbook for overcoming self-doubt, for revelling in success, for aiming high. It is about mastering physical and mental goals, enjoying victories and fighting adversity." His most recent book is Keeping My Head: A Life in Cricket.

Melbourne rock band Telemachus Brown wrote a song about Langer entitled (Wrong about) Justin Langer. It was released on their 2006 EP Medicine Songs and was a hit for the band on Melbourne university radio. The song could be a reference to Langer's transformation from being an average Test batsman in his early career to a world-class opener later in his career.

Langer is a devout Catholic, as was his Australian opening batsman partner Matthew Hayden. Politically, he is conservative, an admirer of former Liberal Australian Prime Minister John Howard, and considered running for office as a member of the Liberal Party of Australia.

== Notes ==
Sporting positions
Preceded by Ian Blackwell	Somerset County Cricket Captain; 2007–2009	Succeeded by Marcus Trescothick
Preceded by Mark Ramprakash	Middlesex County Cricket Captain; 2000	Succeeded by Angus Fraser
