= February 2006 in sports =

<<	February 2006					>>
Su	Mo	Tu	We	Th	Fr	Sa
			1	2	3	4
5	6	7	8	9	10	11
12	13	14	15	16	17	18
19	20	21	22	23	24	25
26	27	28
Canada; India; Sports

This list shows notable sports-related deaths, events, and notable outcomes that occurred in February 2006.

== Deaths ==
- 26: Ace Adams
- 23: Telmo Zarraonaindía
- 20: Curt Gowdy
- 16: Ernie Stautner
- 14: Jackie Pallo
- 11: Ken Fletcher
- 3: Johnny Vaught
- 1: Dick Bass
- 1: Dick Brooks
- 1: Jake Wade

== Sporting seasons ==
- Cricket 2005–06: Australia; West Indies
- Football (soccer) 2006:
  - England: Premier League; England (general)
  - Scotland
  - Denmark: Superliga
  - France: Ligue 1;
  - UEFA Champions League; UEFA Cup
  - Argentina
  - Australia: Hyundai A-League
- Rugby union 2005–06: Heineken Cup, 2006 Super 14
- U.S. and Canadian sports 2005–06:
  - NHL; NBA; NASCAR

== 28 February 2006 (Tuesday) ==
- Football (soccer): England Under-21s defeat Norway Under-21 3–1 at the Madejski Stadium. Anton Ferdinand had struck the post for England before Peter Whittingham's low free-kick put them ahead on 24 minutes. Borre Steenslid levelled on 52 minutes with a neat header, David Bentley quickly restored the lead with a cool finish. And he soon added another, controlling a mis-hit volley from Tom Huddlestone and firing into the corner of the net.

== 27 February 2006 (Monday) ==
- Baseball: Seventeen new members are elected to the Baseball Hall of Fame in a special vote for candidates from the Negro leagues: Ray Brown, Willard Brown, Andy Cooper, Frank Grant, Pete Hill, Biz Mackey, Effa Manley, José Méndez, Alex Pompez, Cum Posey, Louis Santop, Mule Suttles, Ben Taylor, Cristóbal Torriente, Sol White, J. L. Wilkinson and Jud Wilson. Manley is the first woman ever elected.
- NCAA College Basketball
  - Men's:
    - AP Poll: Duke retains the top spot. UConn moves up one spot to second after defeating Villanova yesterday. Memphis moves up one spot to No. 3, Villanova drops from No. 2 to No. 4, and Gonzaga remains at No. 5.
    - (16) West Virginia 67, (8) Pittsburgh 62: In the last home game for Mountaineers seniors Kevin Pittsnogle, Mike Gansey, and Joe Herber, Pittsnogle scores 26 and Herber adds 16 to clinch a first-round bye in the upcoming Big East tournament.
    - (5) Gonzaga 75, San Francisco 72: Adam Morrison leads all scorers with 34 points, but his assist with 1.0 second remaining on a three-pointer by Pierre Marie Altidor-Cespedes gives the Bulldogs their margin of victory. The Bulldogs complete their second unbeaten season in West Coast Conference play in the last three years.
  - Women's:
    - AP Poll: North Carolina returns to No. 1 after their Saturday win over Duke, who drops to No. 2. LSU, Maryland, and Ohio State fill out the top five.

== 26 February 2006 (Sunday) ==
- Rugby union:
  - 2006 Six Nations – Round 3
    - Ireland 31–5 Wales
- Road running:
  - Lornah Kiplagat and Wilson Kiprotich win the feminine and masculine branch of the World's Best 10K in San Juan, Puerto Rico.
- XX Winter Olympic Games, Turin, final day:
  - Cross-country skiing:
    - Giorgio Di Centa of Italy wins the 50 km freestyle event. Russian Yevgeny Dementyev claims the silver and Austrian Mikhail Botvinov gets the bronze. (CBC)
  - Ice hockey, men's gold medal game
    - Defenceman Nicklas Lidström scores the winning, third-period goal, leading Sweden to a 3–2 win over Finland, in the men's ice hockey final, capturing the last gold medal of the Turin Games. (CBC)
- Auto racing: NASCAR Nextel Cup: Even though Greg Biffle led the most laps, he blew his engine to fall out of contention at the Auto Club 500. Biffle's Roush Racing teammate Matt Kenseth won the event.
- NCAA College basketball
  - Men's:
    - (3) UConn 89, (2) Villanova 75: Behind a career-high 23 points from Denham Brown and 17 from the nation's leading scorer off the bench, Rashad Anderson, the homestanding Huskies avenge a loss two weeks ago to the Wildcats that knocked them from the top spot in the polls.
  - Women's:
    - Florida 95, (5) Tennessee 93 (OT): A historic loss for the Lady Vols on Senior Day in Knoxville. This is their first loss to an unranked team at home since 1984, and marks the first time since the women's rankings began in 1976 that they have lost twice to unranked teams in the same season.

== 25 February 2006 (Saturday) ==
- XX Winter Olympic Games, Turin, day fifteen:
  - Speed skating:
    - Clara Hughes of Canada sets the winning times at 6:59.07 for the gold medal in the 5000m event. German Claudia Pechstein skates to a silver medal. Cindy Klassen, also from Canada, gets the bronze, her fifth medal at these Games. (CBC)
  - Biathlon:
    - Anna Carin Olofsson of Sweden wins the women's 12.5-km free gold with Kati Wilhelm of Germany taking the silver and her compatriot Uschi Disl capturing the bronze. (CBC)
    - Michael Greis of Germany win the men's 15-km freestyle to capture his third gold medal in Turin. Tomasz Sikora of Poland wins the silver and Ole Einar Bjørndalen the bronze. (CBC)
  - Short track speed skating:
    - American Apolo Anton Ohno wins the men's 500m, earning his second career gold medal. Canada's François-Louis Tremblay wins the silver, while Ahn Hyun-Soo of South Korea is denied of his third individual gold medal of the Olympics, settling for the bronze and his third career Olympic medal. (Reuters), (CBC)
    - South Korea's Jin Sun-Yu wins her third gold of the Games in the women's 1000m. Chinese women Wang Meng and Yang Yang take the silver and bronze respectively. (CBC)
    - South Korea wins the gold medal in the men's 5000m relay. Ahn wins his third gold medal of the Games, bringing his total number of medal in Turin to four. Canada takes the silver, while the United States gets bronze. (CBC)
  - Alpine skiing:
    - The Austrian team takes all three medals in the men's slalom: Gold for Benjamin Raich, silver for Reinfried Herbst, bronze for Rainer Schönfelder. (CBC)
  - Ice hockey: men's bronze medal game
    - Czech Republic 3 – Russia 0 (CBC)
  - Bobsleigh:
    - The German bob driven by André Lange wins gold in the 4-man event 0.13 seconds ahead of the Russian bob driven by Alexandre Zoubkov and 0.41 seconds ahead of Martin Annen's Swiss sleigh. Pierre Lueders pilots his Canada 1 sleigh to a fourth-place finish, missing the podium by 0.09 seconds. (CBC)
- Lacrosse:
  - 2006 NLL All Star Game
    - West Division All Star Team 14–13 East Division All Star Team
- Rugby union:
  - 2006 Six Nations – Round 3
    - France 37–12 Italy
      - The scoreline flatters an error-riddled France team, which had to come back from a 12–8 halftime deficit in front of their home fans.
    - Scotland 18–12 England
      - In a tight match which saw no tries by either side, Chris Paterson's five penalties lead the Scots to a win over their Auld Enemy, claiming the Calcutta Cup for the first time since 2000 and sending the Murrayfield crowd home delirious.
  - 2006 Super 14 – Round 3.
    - Crusaders defeat Sharks (1 BP) 22–20 in Timaru
      - The Crusaders got home in a tight match with a Dan Carter drop goal with six and a half minutes remaining. The Sharks led most of the game before this, with Percy Montgomery intercepting a Carter pass early in the match. The overall officiating of the match was poor, with two Crusaders tries disallowed when television replays proved differently.
    - Reds (1 BP) loss to Blues 20–21 in Brisbane
      - The Blues held on to a one-point win late in the game. The win was the first for the Blues this season while the Reds are 13th on the table (out of 14) on two points. The Reds are yet to win a game.
- Cricket: West Indies in New Zealand
  - Game Three in the Five match One Day International series.
    - New Zealand defeat the West Indies by 21 runs in Christchurch and win the series.
      - New Zealand won the toss and elected to bat, with some late hitting by Nathan Astle bringing his score up to 118 not out and New Zealand to 276–6 with three sixes of the last three balls of the innings. Ian Bradshaw was the pick of the West Indian bowlers, with 3–41 off 8 overs. In reply the West Indies were all out at the end of 49 overs. Astle was named Man of the Match. Cricinfo
- NCAA College Basketball:
  - Men's:
    - Duke player JJ Redick breaks the Atlantic Coast Conference career scoring record that was previously held by Dickie Hemric and has stood since 1955. Scoring 11 points against Temple, Redick upped his career total to 2,590 points, surpassing Hemric's record of 2,587.
  - Women's:
    - (2) North Carolina 77, (1) Duke 65: Ivory Latta scores 18 points, and Erlana Larkins and La'Tangela Atkinson both rack up double-doubles, as the Tar Heels score their fifth consecutive win over the Blue Devils, likely returning them to No. 1 in the polls. This was the first advance sellout ever for the women's team at Carmichael Auditorium.

== 24 February 2006 (Friday) ==
- Rugby union: 2006 Super 14 – Round 3.
  - Hurricanes (1BP) defeat Cats 29–16 in Wellington.
    - The Hurricanes picked up a bonus point for four tries with Lome Fa'atau scoring 2. The Cats were leading 5 minutes before half-time, despite being large underdogs. TVNZ
  - Force loss to Chiefs 26–9 in Perth.
    - The Chiefs picked up their first win of the season, scoring 3 tries to nothing. This included a team try where Sosene Anesi got past several defenders, which saw Mark Ranby score under the posts. The Force had a poor kicking game, with pointless kicks and several going out on the full. The Force have a bye next weekend. ARU
  - Stormers drew with Brumbies 15 all in Cape Town.
    - The Brumbies drew with the Stormers 15-all after missing several chances. All of the Stormers points came from penalties, while the Brumbies scored two tries.
- XX Winter Olympic Games, Turin, day fourteen:
  - Cross-country skiing:
    - Kateřina Neumannová of the Czech Republic wins the women's 30 km freestyle event. Russian Julija Tchepalova claims the silver and Pole Justyna Kowalczyk gets the bronze. (CBC)
  - Alpine skiing:
    - American Julia Mancuso captures gold in the women's giant slalom. Finland's Tanja Poutianen wins the silver and Swede Anna Ottosson the bronze. (CBC)
  - Speed skating:
    - Bob de Jong of the Netherlands, the reigning world champion, set the winning time at 13:01.57 for the gold medal in the men's 10000m event. American Chad Hedrick skated to a silver medal. The bronze went to Carl Verheijen, also of the Netherlands. (CBC)
  - Curling:
    - The United States men's team defeats Great Britain with a score of 8–6 to take the bronze medal. (CBC)
    - Canada used a six-point sixth end to defeat Finland 10–4 in the gold medal match to win the nation's first gold medal in men's curling after winning silver in 1998 and 2002. (CBC)
  - Ice hockey, men's semi finals:
    - Sweden 7 – Czech Republic 3 (CBC)
    - Finland 4 – Russia 0: Antero Niittymäki posted his third shutout of the tournament. (CBC)

== 23 February 2006 (Thursday) ==
- Football: 2005–06 UEFA Cup – Round of 32, second leg, progressing teams shown in **bold**.
  - **Strasbourg** 0–0 Litex Lovech
  - Espanyol 0–3 **Schalke 04**
  - **Steaua Bucharest** 0–1 Heerenveen
  - **Rapid Bucharest** 2–0 Hertha Berlin
  - AS Monaco 1–1 **FC Basel**
  - AZ Alkmaar 2–1 **Real Betis**
  - **Zenit St. Petersburg** 2–1 Rosenborg
  - **Levski Sofia** 2–0 Artmedia Bratislava
  - **Marseille** 2–1 Bolton Wanderers
  - Shakhtar Donetsk 0–0 **Lille**
  - Lens 1–0 **Udinese**
  - **Sevilla** 2–0 Lokomotiv Moscow
  - **Roma** 2–1 Club Brugge
  - **Middlesbrough** 0–1 VfB Stuttgart
    - Middlesbrough win on the away goals rule.
  - **Palermo** 1–0 Slavia Prague
    - Palermo win on the away goals rule.
  - **Hamburg** 2–0 FC Thun (UEFA.com)
- XX Winter Olympic Games, Turin, day thirteen:
  - Snowboarding, women's parallel giant slalom:
    - Defending world cup champion Daniela Meuli of Switzerland won gold with Germany's Amelie Kober taking the silver and American Rosey Fletcher the bronze. (CBC)
  - Biathlon, women's 4x6-km relay:
    - Despite missing veteran Olga Pyleva, suspended for two years after failing an anti-doping test last week, the Russian team of Albina Akhatova, Anna Bogaliy, Svetlana Ishmuratova and Olga Zaitseva led from start to finish, posting a gold medal-winning time of 1:16:12.5. Two-time defending Olympic gold medallists from Germany finished 50.7 seconds behind for the silver. The French team took the bronze, more than two minutes back. (CBC)
  - Curling:
    - Canada (Glenys Bakker, Amy Nixon, Christine Keshen, Sandra Jenkins and Shannon Kleibrink) wins the bronze medal in women's curling, defeating Norway 11–5 in eight ends. (CBC)
    - The Swedish women's team skipped by Anette Norberg win the gold medal match against Switzerland with a 7–6 double take out on the last stone of the 11th end. (CBC)
  - Freestyle skiing:
    - China's Han Xiaopeng wins gold in men's aerials by just over 2 points over Dmitri Dashinski of Belarus. Vladimir Lebedev of Russia wins Bronze. (CBC)
  - Figure Skating:
    - Shizuka Arakawa of Japan performs a conservative but clean free skate to defeat Sasha Cohen of the United States and Irina Slutskaya of Russia, who both suffer falls and take silver and bronze respectively. Arakawa's win gives Japan their first medal in Turin. (CBC)

== 22 February 2006 (Wednesday) ==
- Football: 2005–06 UEFA Champions League – Round of 16, first leg.
  - Chelsea 1–2 Barcelona
  - Rangers 2–2 Villarreal
  - Werder Bremen 3–2 Juventus
  - Ajax 2–2 Internazionale (UEFA.com)
- Cricket: West Indies in New Zealand
  - ODI Series Game Two in the Five match series.
    - New Zealand defeat West Indies by 3 wickets and go 2–0 up.
      - New Zealand won the toss and elected to field first, restricting the West Indies to 200–9 off 50 overs. New Zealand recovered from 13–4 after 3.2 overs to win with 3 wickets in hand. Daniel Vettori was awarded Man of the match for his all-round figures of 53 not out and 28–1 off ten overs.
- Cricket: Sri Lanka in Bangladesh
  - ODI Series Game Two of Three.
    - Bangladesh defeats Sri Lanka by four wickets in Bogra, Bangladesh, prompting scenes of celebration in the country . It is Bangladesh's first victory against Sri Lanka.
      - Bangladesh won the toss and sent Sri Lanka into bat. The tourists struggled to 212 from their allotted overs, with only opener Sanath Jayasuriya (96 runs from 110 balls) passing fifty. Bangladesh reached the target with two overs to spare to win by four wickets. Scorecard
- XX Winter Olympic Games, Turin, day twelve:
  - Cross-country skiing, Women's 1.1 km Sprint:
    - Chandra Crawford of Canada sprinted in a time of two minutes, 12.3 seconds to a gold medal in her Olympic debut. Germany's Claudia Künzel edged out Russian Alena Sidko to earn the silver while Beckie Scott finished fourth. (CBC), (Turin2006.org)
  - Cross-country skiing, Men's Sprint
    - Björn Lind of Sweden sprinted to a gold medal after a superior race which left his opponents a long way behind. France's Roddy Darragon edged out Swede Thobias Fredriksson to earn the silver while Cristian Zorzi of Italy could not repeat his performance from the relay and finished in fourth place. (Turin2006.org)
  - Snowboarding, parallel giant slalom:
    - Philipp Schoch of Switzerland bested his elder brother Simon Schoch in the final of the men's snowboard parallel giant slalom to successfully defend his Olympic gold medal. Siegfried Gabner of Austria took bronze. (CBC)
  - Alpine skiing, women's slalom:
    - Anja Pärson of Sweden wins her first Olympic gold medal and the fifth Olympic medal of her career. Austrians Nicole Hosp and Marlies Schild take silver and bronze. Janica Kostelić of Croatia fails to add to her record six career women's alpine medals, finishing 0.15 seconds behind Schild. (CBC)
  - Speed skating, women's 1,500 metres:
    - Canadians Cindy Klassen and Kristina Groves finish one-two, with Klassen winning by a dominant 1.47 seconds. Dutch Ireen Wüst takes bronze, while German medal favourite Anni Friesinger finishes fourth and misses out on the medals. (CBC)
  - Ice hockey, men's quarterfinals:
    - Sweden 6 – Switzerland 2 (CBC)
    - Finland 4 – USA 3 (CBC)
    - Russia 2 – Canada 0 Kazakh-born goaltender Evgeni Nabokov hands the Canadians their third shutout in four games, eliminating the defending champion from the tournament. (CBC)
    - Czech Republic 3 – Slovakia 1 (CBC)
  - Curling:
    - Men's semi-finals:
      - Finland 4 – Great Britain 3
      - Canada 11 – USA 5 (CBC)
    - Women's semi-finals
      - Sweden 5 – Norway 4
      - Switzerland 7 – Canada 5 (CBC)
  - Short track speed skating:
    - South Korea wins the gold medal in the women's 3,000 m relay, while Canada takes silver, and Italy bronze. (Turin2006.org), (CBC)

== 21 February 2006 (Tuesday) ==
- Football:
  - 2005–06 UEFA Champions League – Round of 16, first leg.
    - Bayern Munich 1–1 A.C. Milan
    - Benfica 1–0 Liverpool
    - Real Madrid 0–1 Arsenal: Arsenal become the first English team ever to beat Real Madrid on their own ground.
    - PSV 0–1 Lyon (UEFA.com)
  - The English Football Association announces that the final of the FA Cup in May will be held at Cardiff's Millennium Stadium, as the new Wembley Stadium in London will not have been completed in time. The Football League playoff finals will also take place in Cardiff. England's pre-World Cup friendly matches against Hungary on 30 May and Jamaica on 3 June have also been moved, to Old Trafford, Trafford, Greater Manchester. (BBC)
- XX Winter Olympic Games, Turin, day eleven:
  - Biathlon, men's relay:
    - Sven Fischer, Michael Greis, Ricco Groß and Michael Rösch of Germany posted a winning time of one hour, 21 minutes and 51.5 seconds. Russia claimed the silver and France took the bronze. The win gives Fischer his fourth career Olympic gold during his 13-year career. (CBC)
  - Nordic combined, men's 7.5-kilometre sprint:
    - Austrian Felix Gottwald completed the course in 18 minutes, 29 seconds. Norwegian Magnus Moan (5.4 seconds behind) took the silver medal, while Germany's Georg Hettich (9.6 seconds behind) claimed the bronze. These were the same three medallists in the 15-km event, each getting a different medal. (CBC)
  - Speed skating, men's 1500-m:
    - Italian Enrico Fabris, with a time of one minute, 45.97 seconds, became the first non-American to win an individual men's event through the first four races of these Winters Games. Shani Davis captured the silver medal in 1:46.13, and Chad Hedrick took the bronze in 1:46.22. (CBC)
  - Ice hockey, men's preliminary round:
    - Switzerland 3 – Italy 3 (CBC)
    - Kazakhstan 5 – Latvia 2 (CBC)
    - Canada 3 – Czech Republic 2 (CBC)
    - Finland 2 – Germany 0: Finland wins Group A undefeated. (CBC)
    - Slovakia 3 – Sweden 0: Slovakia wins Group B undefeated. (CBC)
    - Russia 5 – United States 4 (CBC)
  - Bobsleigh, Two-woman event:
    - Sandra Kiriasis and Anja Schneiderheinze of Germany won the two-woman bobsleigh competition on a combined four-run time of three minutes, 49.98 seconds. Americans Shauna Rohbock and Valerie Fleming earned a silver medal (3:50.69), while Gerda Weissensteiner and Jennifer Isacco of Italy took the bronze (3:51.01). (CBC)
  - Figure skating:
    - Sasha Cohen of the United States leads after the ladies' short program, edging out Russian competitor Irina Slutskaya by only 0.03 points. (CBC)

== 20 February 2006 (Monday) ==
- XX Winter Olympic Games, Turin, day ten:
  - Alpine skiing, men's giant slalom:
    - Benjamin Raich of Austria comes from fifth place in the first run to win the men's giant slalom event after two runs. (CBC)
  - Alpine skiing, women's super-g:
    - Michaela Dorfmeister wins the women's super-g event and grabs her second gold medal of the Games and Austria's second gold of the day. (CBC)
  - Women's ice hockey:
    - The United States shuts out Finland 4–0 in the women's bronze medal game. Katie King scores a hat trick for the Americans. (CBC)
    - Canada defeats Sweden 4–1 in the women's ice hockey gold medal game, winning its second straight Olympic gold medal in the event. (CBC) Canadian forward Hayley Wickenheiser, playing despite a bone fracture in her wrist, was named the Olympic women's hockey tournament's most valuable player. (CBC)

== 19 February 2006 (Sunday) ==
- Major League Baseball: Barry Bonds tells USA Today's Bob Nightingale that 2006 will be his final season.
- NBA
  - 2006 NBA All-Star Game at Houston, Texas: The East All Stars defeated the West All Stars, 122–120. LeBron James of the Cleveland Cavaliers was named the game's MVP with 29 points, 2 assists, and 6 rebounds. Tracy McGrady of the host Houston Rockets led all scorers with 36.
- Auto racing: Daytona 500
  - In the 48th edition of "The Super Bowl of Stock Car Racing", Jimmie Johnson wins his first "Great American Race."
- XX Winter Olympic Games, Turin, day nine:
  - Cross-country skiing, 4 × 10 km men's relay:
    - Italy takes the gold in the men's 4 × 10-kilometre relay, with Italian anchor Cristian Zorzi crossing the finish line 15 seconds ahead of silver medalist, Germany Sweden was the bronze medalist while Norway failed to medal in this event for the first time since 1988.
  - Bobsleigh:
    - The German bob driven by André Lange wins gold in the men's 2-man event 0.21 seconds ahead of the Canadian bob driven by Pierre Lueders and 0.35 seconds ahead of Martin Annen's Swiss sled.
  - Speed skating, women's 1000m:
    - Marianne Timmer of the Netherlands wins the women's 1000m in 1.16.05, 8 years after winning in Nagano. Cindy Klassen of Canada comes in second and favorite Anni Friesinger of Germany wins the bronze, 0.06 seconds behind Timmer.
- Cricket: ICC Under-19 World Cup 2005–06
  - Pakistan defeat India in the final by 38 runs.
    - Pakistan won the toss and elected to bat first ending all out on 109. India's top order failed, with 4 of the first 6 batsmen scoring 0 leaving India at one stage 9/6. India eventually ended all out on 71.

== 18 February 2006 (Saturday) ==
- Rugby union: 2006 Super 14 – Round two.
  - Hurricanes (1BP) 29–5 Western Force at New Plymouth
    - The Hurricanes enjoyed their second bonus point win of the season, with four tries, including 2 within the first 10 minutes. The Force turned down 5 kickable penalties in the first 20 minutes and their only points came as a consolation try after the siren.
  - Reds 21–47 (1BP) Crusaders at Brisbane
    - The Crusaders recorded their second bonus point victory over the Reds, despite being down 14–11 at half time and fly half and goal kicker Dan Carter missing several penalty attempts. However, Carter, the 2005 IRB player of the year, led a comeback midway through the second half, scoring two tries himself. The Crusaders went on to score 4 second half tries.
  - Sharks (1 BP) 26–27 (1 BP) Cheetahs at Durban
    - The Cheetahs picked up their first Super 14 victory, coming from being 10 points behind at half time to win by a point. Giscard Pieters scored two tries in the victory.
  - Stormers (1 BP) 26–32 (1 BP) Waratahs at Cape Town
    - The Waratahs recorded their second victory off the season with a come-from-behind win. Trailing 20–10 at the break, the Waratahs scored 3 second half tries, including one in the final minutes of the match.
- Cricket: West Indies in New Zealand
  - First ODI of the five match series – New Zealand defeat West Indies by 81 runs in Wellington.
    - New Zealand recorded a comprehensive victory with Nathan Astle scoring 90 and New Zealand ending up on 288–9 off 50 overs. West Indies never looked like winning, with wickets falling at regular intervals, despite Ramnaresh Sarwan and Daren Ganga both scoring 50s. Vice Captain Daniel Vettori was the pick of the New Zealand bowlers with 2–29 off 10 overs.
- XX Winter Olympic Games, Turin, day eight:
  - Cross-country skiing, women's 20 km relay:
    - Russia wins the 20 km women's relay handily, finishing 10 seconds ahead of silver medalists Germany and 11 seconds ahead of bronze winners Italy.
  - Curling:
    - In the men's competition, Italy shocks Canada 6–5, while the United States beats Germany 8–5. Great Britain edges Switzerland, 6–5, and Finland takes out Norway 7–3.
  - Ice hockey:
    - Switzerland stuns Canada 2–0 in the men's competition. Carolina Hurricanes goaltender Martin Gerber has 49 saves in the win.
  - Short track speed skating:
    - Jin Sun-Yu and Choi Eun-Kyung of South Korea take gold and silver in the women's 1500m. China's Wang Meng takes bronze. In the men's 1000m, Ahn Hyun-Soo and Lee Ho-Suk of South Korea take gold and silver with United States' Apolo Anton Ohno taking the bronze.
  - Speed skating:
    - The United States takes gold and silver in the men's 1000m with Shani Davis outskating Joey Cheek for first. Erben Wennemars of the Netherlands receives bronze. Davis' victory makes him the first black person to win an individual gold medal in the history of the Winter Olympics.
  - Ski jumping:
    - After a disappointing performance on the K90 hill, Austrian ski jumpers Thomas Morgenstern and Andreas Kofler take gold and silver on the large hill, with the smallest possible margin of 0.1 points between them. Lars Bystøl, winner of gold on the normal hill, places third.

== 17 February 2006 (Friday) ==
- Rugby union: 2006 Super 14 – Round two.
  - Highlanders 25–13 Blues at Dunedin
    - The Highlanders had a lucky win over the Blues, with two tries in the second half. One was an intercept in the Highlanders 22 and the second was a very close video replay try.
  - Cats 21–16 Chiefs (1 BP) Johannesburg
    - The Chiefs lose their second South African Super 14 match. However they picked up a bonus point for their 5-point loss.
  - (1 BP) Bulls 21–27 Brumbies Pretoria
    - Stirling Mortlock scores and converts a try at the death to give the Brumbies their second win on the road, over the Bulls, who got a bonus point for their 6-point loss.
- XX Winter Olympic Games, Turin, day seven:
  - Cross-country skiing, 15 km men:
    - Andrus Veerpalu wins Estonia's third cross-country gold medal, successfully defending his gold from the 2002 Games. Czech Lukáš Bauer wins silver, 15 seconds behind Veerpalu, while German Tobias Angerer bronze. (CBC)
  - Snowboarding, women's cross:
    - Tanja Frieden of Switzerland takes the first ever Olympic gold medal in women's snowboard cross, passing the American Lindsey Jacobellis near the end of the race. Canada's Dominique Maltais finishes with bronze. Maltais's teammate Maëlle Ricker suffered a bruised hip and a mild concussion after a spectacular crash early in the race. (CBC)
  - Ice hockey, women's semifinal:
    - In a remarkable upset, Sweden defeats the United States 3–2 in a shootout to advance to the gold medal game against Canada. The United States had previously never been defeated in Olympic play by any team except Canada; however, an incredible game by Swedish goaltender Kim Martin brought the Swedes an unexpected victory. The United States will play for the bronze medal against Finland. (CBC)
    - Canada soundly defeats Finland 6–0 in their semi-final, to set up a Canada – Sweden gold medal game. The United States will play Finland for bronze. (CBC)
  - Skeleton, men's:
    - Canadians Duff Gibson and Jeffrey Pain win gold and silver despite Pain nearly losing control of his sled coming around the penultimate corner. Switzerland's Gregor Staehli finishes third, beating out Canadian Paul Boehm by only two-tenths of a second to prevent a Canadian sweep of the podium. The 39-year-old Gibson becomes the oldest individual gold medalist in Winter Olympics history. (CBC)

== 16 February 2006 (Thursday) ==
- Football: 2005–06 UEFA Cup – Round of 32, First leg.
  - VfB Stuttgart 1–2 Middlesbrough
  - Slavia Prague 3–1 Palermo
  - FC Thun 1–0 Hamburg
- Cricket: West Indies in New Zealand
  - Twenty20: Tied match. New Zealand defeat West Indies in a bowl off 3–0.
    - Note: Chris Cairns' final international cricket game for New Zealand.
      - The New Zealanders won the toss, playing in the beige uniforms of the 80's, and sent the West Indies in. The "Windies" scored a modest 126–7 off their 20 overs, a run rate of only 6.30 an over. In reply, Lou Vincent scored 42 off 37, the highest score in the match. New Zealand looked to have the game in the bag, needing just 47 off nine overs. However, in the next 7 overs, Dwayne Smith and Chris Gayle had only 31 runs scored of their bowling, reducing the Black Caps to 110–8. New Zealand then required 17 to win off the last over and the game looked beyond them. A James Franklin six off the second ball changed things and off the last ball, New Zealand required 5 to win and 4 to tie with tailender Shane Bond facing. Bond hit a four, sending the game into a bowl off. The 12 balls missed the stumps and it took two hits from last ball hero Shane Bond to break the deadlock and then a hit from Scott Styris gave New Zealand a 3–0 win in the bowl off. The first ODI starts on 18 February.
  - ODI: India defeat Pakistan by 5 wickets at the Multan Cricket Stadium in the fourth ODI.
    - India win the 5 match series 3–1.
      - India won the toss and sent Pakistan into bat. The choice paid off as Pakistan ended all out for 161. Yuvraj Singh picked up 4 wickets and India coasted to an easy win to take the series.
- XX Winter Olympic Games, Turin, day six:
  - Biathlon, women's sprint:
    - Florence Baverel-Robert of France wins the women's biathlon 7.5 km sprint. Anna Carin Olofsson of Sweden and Lilia Efremova of Ukraine complete the podium. (CBC.ca)
    - Olga Pyleva, who placed second at the 15 km, has been disqualified from the Games following a positive test for carphedon. She has been stripped of her medal. (CBC.ca), (Olympic.org)
  - Cross-country skiing:
    - Kristina Šmigun wins her second gold medal of these Games, but she's still the only Estonian to medal. Three Norwegians follow, though over 20 seconds behind Šmigun. (CBC.ca)
  - Nordic combined, team:
    - Austria win the team competition after Mario Stecher catches up with Germany's Jens Gaiser on the final 5 km leg. Finland win bronze nearly a minute ahead of the rest of the field. (NBC Olympics)
  - Snowboarding, snowboard cross:
    - Seth Wescott of USA wins the inaugural Men's Snowboard Cross final. Radoslav Židek of Slovakia is second and Paul-Henri Delarue of France is third. (CBC.ca)
  - Speed skating, team pursuit:
    - The Italian men's team of Matteo Anesi, Stefano Donagrandi, Enrico Fabris, Ermanno Ioriatti and Ippolito Sanfratello upsets the Canadians in the final to take the gold medal, after the Dutch team fell with a large lead in Italy's semi-final. The Dutch recover in the bronze-medal race to take third place. (CBC)
    - World Cup-leading Germany's team of Daniela Anschütz, Anni Friesinger, Lucille Opitz, Claudia Pechstein and Sabine Völker defeat the Canadian team for the women's gold medal. Russia takes bronze. (CBC)
  - Figure skating, men's free skate
    - Three-time world champion Russian Evgeni Plushenko takes an unsurprising gold medal after a first-place free skate and short program. Switzerland's Stéphane Lambiel takes silver, while Canadian Jeffrey Buttle overcomes a poor short program to finish in third place. (CBC)
  - Skeleton
    - Two-time world champion Maya Pedersen sets the two fastest times to win the Skeleton, and Switzerland's first gold of the Games. Shelley Rudman wins silver, the UK's first medal of any color. Mellisa Hollingsworth-Richards takes bronze for Canada.

== 15 February 2006 (Wednesday) ==
- Football: 2005–06 UEFA Cup – Round of 32, First leg.
  - Litex Lovech 0–2 Strasbourg
  - Schalke 04 2–1 Espanyol
  - Heerenveen 1–3 Steaua Bucharest
  - Hertha Berlin 0–1 Rapid Bucharest
  - FC Basel 1–0 AS Monaco
  - Real Betis 2–0 AZ Alkmaar
  - Rosenborg 0–2 Zenit St. Petersburg
  - Artmedia Bratislava 0–1 Levski Sofia
  - Bolton Wanderers 0–0 Marseille
  - Lille 3–2 Shakhtar Donetsk
  - Udinese 3–0 Lens
  - Lokomotiv Moscow 0–1 Sevilla
  - Club Brugge 1–2 Roma (UEFA.com)
- XX Winter Olympic Games, Turin, day five:
  - Alpine skiing:
    - Michaela Dorfmeister of Austria wins the women's downhill. Martina Schild of Switzerland and Anja Pärson of Sweden complete the podium. (CBC.ca)
  - Nordic combined:
    - High winds in the ski jumping hill force the jury to abandon the team competition midway through the second round. The teams will resume tomorrow. (NBC Olympics)
  - Short track speed skating:
    - Wang Meng wins the women's 500-m race, capturing the first gold medal in the Turin Games for China. Bulgaria's Evgenia Radanova takes the silver, while Canada's Anouk Leblanc-Boucher claims the bronze. (CBC.ca)
  - Freestyle skiing:
    - Transplanted Canadian skier Dale Begg-Smith wins Australia's first gold medal in men's moguls. (CBC.ca)
    - Jason McElwain, a high school senior with autism, scored 20 points in his first and only high school basketball game. Video footage of the game made international headlines.

== 14 February 2006 (Tuesday) ==
- Cricket: 2005–06 VB Series
  - Australia defeat Sri Lanka by 9 wickets at Brisbane Cricket Ground after 45.3 overs.
    - Sri Lanka won the toss and elected to bat. After being 2–28, Kumar Sangakkara and Mahela Jayawardene put on a 100 run partnership. Jayawardene went on to score 86 off 91 balls. Russel Arnold made 76 off 71. Sri Lanka's final score was 266–9 off 50 overs. In Australia's innings, openers Adam Gilchrist and Simon Katich scored centuries to win the game by 9 wickets. Captain Ricky Ponting was not out with Katich on 28. Australia came from behind in the finals to win 2–1. Andrew Symonds was named man of the series, and Adam Gilchrist man of the match.
- XX Winter Olympic Games, Turin, day four:
  - Biathlon, men's 10-kilometre sprint :
    - Sven Fischer won Germany's second gold medal in biathlon with a perfect day on the shooting range and skiing the 10 kilometres in 26 minutes, 11.6 seconds. As in the men's individual, Norwegians take the two other medals. (CBC.ca)
  - Cross-country, men's team sprint, classical style:
    - Thobias Fredriksson and Björn Lind from Sweden wins the gold medal at the men's team sprint, classical style, bringing in Sweden's first medal of the 2006 Winter Olympics. Minutes earlier, Lina Andersson and Anna Dahlberg, also from Sweden, won the women's gold medal in the same event. (BBC Sport)
  - Speed skating, women's 500 metres:
    - 34-year-old Russian Svetlana Zhurova, who left speed skating in 2003 to become a mother, becomes the oldest woman to win a speed skating gold medal by clocking times of 38.23 and 38.34. In the last pair of the second round, she beat Chinese Wang Manli, runner-up in the first round with 38.31, by 0.13 seconds to secure the gold medal. (CBC.ca)
  - Alpine skiing, men's combined:
    - Unheralded 21-year-old Ted Ligety of the USA wins gold by virtue of two nearly-flawless slalom runs. The heavy favorite, Ligety's countryman Bode Miller, was disqualified for straddling a gate in his first slalom run after leading by two full seconds following the downhill segment. Ivica Kostelić of Croatia takes silver, while bronze goes to Rainer Schönfelder of Austria. (CBC.ca)
  - Ice hockey women's group stage
    - Pool "A"
      - Italy 1–5 Russia: After over 128 minutes, the Italians scored their first goal in the Olympics, thanks to Sabina Floran on a two-man advantage.
      - Canada 8–1 Sweden: Gillian Apps scored two goals in the rout of the Swedes.
    - Pool "B"
      - Switzerland 1–2 Germany
      - USA 7–3 Finland: The USA scored six straight times between the late second period and the entire third period to put this game away.
  - SEMIFINALS (Friday 17 February): Finland vs. Canada, USA vs. Sweden.

== 13 February 2006 (Monday) ==
- Cricket: India in Pakistan 2005–06
  - Third One Dayer in the Best of Five Series.
    - India defeat Pakistan by five wickets, after 47.4 overs.
      - India won the toss and elect to field first. Shoaib Malik made 108 off 120 balls during Pakistan's innings of 288/8 off their 50 overs. Abdul Razzaq made 64 not out off 56 balls. Irfan Pathan ended the innings with 49/3 off ten overs, which included 2 maidens. In India's innings, Sachin Tendulkar's 95 guided the Indian's towards victory. Yuvraj Singh scored 79* and put on a 102 run stand with Mahendra Singh Dhoni, who scored 72* off 46 balls. This partnership was not out and secured India the win. India now lead the series 2–1.
- XX Winter Olympic Games, Turin, day three:
  - Biathlon, women's 15 km individual:
    - Russia occupies the top two spots on the podium of this distance, with Svetlana Ishmouratova claiming gold 45.5 seconds ahead of compatriot Olga Pyleva. Martina Glagow claimed bronze despite missing one target on the final shooting, thus preventing an all-Russian sweep. (CBC.ca)
  - Curling
    - Men's draw 1:
      - Great Britain 7–5 Italy
      - Sweden 6–3 New Zealand
      - United States 11–5 Norway The Olympic champion Pål Trulsen resign in the eighth end after giving up five points (CBC.ca)
      - Finland 7–2 Switzerland
    - Men's draw 2: (CBC.ca)
      - Canada 10–5 Germany
      - Finland 4–3 United States
      - Great Britain 10–5 New Zealand
      - Sweden 7–5 Italy
    - Women's draw 1:
      - Great Britain 3–2 Denmark Five ends were blanked; Rhona Martin eventually secured a point with the hammer in the tenth end
      - Norway 11–6 United States
      - Sweden 7–5 Canada Anette Norberg claimed a 6–4 lead in the eighth end and held on to beat Canada's Olympic debutant team, skipped by Shannon Kleibrink (CBC.ca)
      - Switzerland 11–4 Italy
  - Figure skating:
    - Tatiana Totmianina and Maxim Marinin of Russia takes gold in the pairs event. Two Chinese pairs claim silver and bronze. (CBC.ca)
  - Ice hockey, women's group stage:
    - Group A: Sweden 11–0 Italy: The Italian team have now given up 27 goals in two games. Sweden clinches a spot in the medal round.
    - Group B: Finland 4–0 Switzerland: The Finns clinch a spot in the medal round.
    - The USA and Canada, who were off from competition, also joined these teams in the medal round.
  - Snowboarding, women's halfpipe:
    - Just as in the men's competition, USA clinch gold and silver, while a Nordic settles for a bronze medal. 19-year-old Hannah Teter made runs of 44.6 and 46.4 points, of which the highest score counted; both scores were higher than any others. Gretchen Bleiler won silver and Norway's Kjersti Buaas bronze. (CBC.ca)
  - Speed skating, men's 500 metres:
    - Joey Cheek becomes the second American to win speed skating gold in two days, as the only skater to go below 35 seconds in a race; he does it in both races, ending with a total time of 69.76 seconds, while Dmitry Dorofeyev, who won silver, had a best time of 35.17 to end with 70.43 seconds. (AP)
  - Eleven athletes are injured during the day: three female downhill skiers crash, including 2002 gold medallist Carole Montillet, in addition, five lugers, two figure skaters and a snowboarder sustain injuries. (CBC.ca)
- NCAA College Basketball:
  - Men's:
    - In the latest AP polls, the top six teams remain the same from last week: UConn, Duke, Memphis, Villanova, Gonzaga, and Texas. Bucknell enters the rankings for the first time in history, at No. 24.
    - #4 Villanova 69, No. 1 University of Connecticut 64: The Wildcats, playing at their second home of the Wachovia Center, storm back from a 12-point deficit early in the second half to score their first win over a No. 1 team since beating University of Connecticut in 1995.
  - Women's:
    - After North Carolina's loss to Maryland Thursday night, Duke regains the top spot. LSU rises to No. 2 after defeating Tennessee the same night. North Carolina drops to third, Maryland rises to No. 4, and Tennessee remains No. 5.

== 12 February 2006 (Sunday) ==
- Football: NFL
  - In the Pro Bowl, the NFL's season finale, played in Hawaii, the NFC took advantage of six turnovers by the AFC as the NFC squad won 23–17. Tampa Bay's Derrick Brooks was named the game's most valuable player.
- Auto racing: NASCAR
  - Rookie Denny Hamlin, who qualified for the Bud Shootout by winning the pole for the fall race at Phoenix International Raceway last season, stuns the field by winning the invitation-only event over teammate Tony Stewart and Dale Earnhardt Jr., who both finished in a dead heat for second.
- Rugby union: 2006 Six Nations Championship
  - Wales 28–18 Scotland
    - Scotland score two tries (one unconverted) in the last minutes to make a more respectable score, but they were never in the match after being reduced to 14 men after 20 minutes.
- XX Winter Olympic Games, Turin
  - Alpine skiing, men's downhill:
    - Antoine Dénériaz of France claims victory 0.72 seconds ahead of Austria's Michael Walchhofer, who had staved off attacks from all other Austrians, Norwegians and Americans before going down to the Frenchman, who "pulled off a startling upset" according to NBC. (NBC Olympics)
  - Cross-country skiing:
    - 7.5+7.5 km double pursuit, women: Kristina Šmigun wins Estonia's first gold medal at these Games by overtaking Kateřina Neumannová on the final stretch. (NBC Olympics)
    - 15+15 km double pursuit, men: Russia's Yevgeny Dementiev wins an event decided in the final 100 metres, overtaking several skiers to win a three-man sprint. Frode Estil takes the fifth medal for Norway in these Games, but fails to reach gold; Estil broke his ski in a fall at the start, but caught up with the pack to beat Italian Pietro Piller Cottrer and win silver. (CBC.ca)
  - Figure skating: Michelle Kwan (United States) withdrew from the Ladies' Figure Skating competition due to her illness and injuries. Despite not winning an Olympic gold medal, Kwan finishes her career as a five-time World Champion and nine time US Champion. Emily Hughes, pending approval from IOC and the ISU, will be Kwan's replacement.
  - Ice hockey, women's group stage:
    - Group A:
      Canada 12–0 Russia: Despite angry e-mails following their record 16–0 win over Italy in the tournament opener (Reuters/Yahoo), the Canadian women have now outscored their opposition 28–0.
    - Group B:
      Germany 0–5 United States
  - Luge, men's singles:
    - Defending Olympic and World champion Armin Zöggeler takes the first gold medal for the host nation by defending his lead in the singles competition, ahead of Russian Albert Demtschenko and Latvian Martins Rubenis (CBC.ca)
  - Short track speed skating, men's 1500 meters:
    - Koreans Ahn Hyun-soo and Lee Ho-suk win the first medals for their country, and make it a 1–2 finish, and Li Jiajun makes it an all-Asian podium. Defending Olympic champion Apolo Ohno stumbles in the penultimate lap of the semi-final, fails to qualify, and eventually finishes eighth. (AP)
  - Ski jumping, normal hill (HS106):
    - Lars Bystøl is the first Norwegian to strike gold in Turin; he leapt from seventh to first place by soaring 103.5 metres in the second round to claim gold ahead of Matti Hautamäki, Finland, and another Norwegian, Roar Ljøkelsøy. (Reuters)
  - Snowboarding, men's halfpipe:
    - Americans Shaun White (46.8 points) and Danny Kass (44.0 points) claims gold and silver at the halfpipe event, keeping the defending World Champion Antti Autti out of the podium. Mason Aguirre also takes fourth place, but Finn Markku Koski splits the Americans with a run worth 41.5 points (CBC.ca).
  - Speed skating, Women's 3000 metres:
    - The Dutch women complete the third 1–2 finish of the day; 19-year-old Ireen Wüst skates a time of 4:02.43 in the tenth pair and watches as all the remaining skaters finish behind her. Renate Groenewold beats Canadian Cindy Klassen in their pair, but the two end up taking silver and bronze. Anni Friesinger, who was, along with Klassen, considered a favourite by CBC, finished outside the podium. (CBC.ca)
- Cricket: 2005–06 VB Series – Second Final
  - Australia defeat Sri Lanka to level the best of three final 1 all.
    - Australia scored 368/5 off their fifty overs after being 10/3 at the start of the third over. Both Ricky Ponting and Andrew Symonds scored centuries. Muttiah Muralitharan finished the innings with figures of 99/0 off 10 overs, the most expensive in ODI history for a 10 over spell. In reply, Sri Lanka ended all out on 201, with Mahela Jayawardene and Russel Arnold scoring half centuries. The series will now be decided on 14 February at the Brisbane Cricket Ground. Andrew Symonds was named man of the match. Australia won the match by 167 runs.

== 11 February 2006 (Saturday) ==
- Cricket : Indian cricket team in Pakistan in 2005–06
  - India level the 5 match ODI series 1–1.
    - Pakistan win the toss and bat, setting India 266 to win at the Rawalpindi Cricket Stadium. Shoaib Malik scored 95 before being run out. India chased down the total with 6.5 overs left, for a 7 wicket victory. Yuvraj Singh made 83 not out.
- XX Winter Olympic Games, Turin, opening day:
  - Biathlon, men's 20 km individual:
    - Michael Greis of Germany wins gold in the time of 54:23.0, despite missing one of his 20 shots, in what NBC describes as an "upset". Defending Olympic champion Ole Einar Bjørndalen clinches silver, 16 seconds behind Greis, after missing two shots, while 1998 gold medallist Halvard Hanevold records his second medal on an Olympic 20 km, pipping Russia's Sergei Tchepikov to the medal by 0.8 seconds. (NBC Olympics)
  - Nordic combined, Gundersen:
    - Georg Hettich of Germany defends his lead after the ski jumping portion with a race of 39:44.6 to record Germany's second gold medal at the Olympics, after two events. Silver medallist Felix Gottwald of Austria and bronze medallist Magnus Moan of Norway both managed to beat Hettich by more than a minute in the cross-country leg, but after eleventh and ninth place respectively in the ski jumping leg, their cross-country skiing is not enough to take them to the very top of the podium. Moan beats compatriot Petter Tande in a dash for the finish line. (NBC Olympics)
  - Speed skating, men's 5000 m:
    - In his quest to emulate Eric Heiden and win five golds at the Winter Olympics, the American and former inline skater Chad Hedrick begins well by winning the opening distance of 5000 metres. His race time of 6:14.68 is 0.02 seconds behind the four-year-old Olympic record of Jochem Uytdehaage. Dutchman Sven Kramer wins silver, 1.72 seconds adrift, while home skater Enrico Fabris takes Italy's first medal with a bronze (NBC Olympics)
  - Freestyle skiing, women's moguls:
    - Qualifying winner and two-time World Cup winner Jennifer Heil of Canada wins the first gold medal for the Canucks in 2006, finishing with a total of 26.50, nearly one point ahead of Norway's defending Olympic champion Kari Traa, who takes Norway's fourth medal of the Games. France's Sandra Laoura wins bronze with 25.37 points. (NBC Olympics)
  - Ice hockey, women's group stage:
    - Group A:
      Sweden 3–1 Russia
      Canada 16–0 Italy: The sixteen goals is an all-time record for women's hockey.
    - Group B:
      Finland 3–0 Germany
      United States 6–0 Switzerland (NBC Olympics)
  - Luge, men's singles:
    - Italy's Armin Zoeggeler is well placed to take the home nation's first gold after clocking the fastest time in both of the runs in the singles event, leading with a time of 1:43.132. The event continues with two more runs tomorrow, with Russian Albert Demtschenko in second place and American Tony Benshoof in third. (NBC Olympics)
- Rugby Union: 2006 Six Nations Championship
  - England 31–16 Italy
    - England secures a hard-fought victory over Italy, who led 9–7 in the second half.
  - France 43–31 Ireland
    - France hold off a strong Irish comeback in the second half after leading 43–3.
- Rugby Union: 2006 Super 14 Season
  - Current title holders, the Crusaders defeat southern neighbours, the Highlanders 38–15 in Christchurch.
  - Last years runners up the Waratahs win a close match in Brisbane over the Reds. The final score was 16–12, with the Reds securing a bonus point for a loss under 7 points.
  - The Stormers win 23–12 over the favourites for the wooden spoon, the Cats in Johannesburg
  - The Sharks get their Super 14 campaign started with a 30–21 over the visiting New Zealand side the Chiefs in Durban.

== 10 February 2006 (Friday) ==
- Football: 2006 African Cup of Nations – Final
  - Egypt 0–0 Ivory Coast (aet, 4–2 on penalties)
    - Egypt win the penalty shoot-out 4–2, to win the African Cup of Nations for a record fifth time (after 1957, 1959, 1986, and 1998).
- Cricket: 2005–06 VB Series – Sri Lanka beat Australia by 22 runs in the first game of the VB Series final, with Tillakaratne Dilshan involved in 4 run outs and a catch.
- Rugby Union: 2006 Super 14 Season
  - In the season opener in Auckland between the Blues and Hurricanes, the visiting Hurricanes storm back from a 16–3 halftime deficit to score a 37–19 bonus-point win over the Blues.
  - Western Force lose their first Super 14 match at home, against the Brumbies 25 – 10.
  - Cheetahs also lose first Super 14 match against the Bulls at home, 18–30. The Bulls also picked up a bonus point for their four tries.

== 9 February 2006 (Thursday) ==
- Football: 2006 African Cup of Nations – Third-place playoff
  - Senegal 0–1 Nigeria
    - Nigeria finish in third place for the third successive Cup of Nations.
- NCAA College Basketball Top 25
  - Men's:
    - #14 Pittsburgh 57, No. 9 West Virginia 53: In the first Backyard Brawl basketball meeting in which both teams were ranked going into the game, the homestanding Panthers hand the Mountaineers their first Big East loss. The Mountaineers shot 34% from the field and 22% from three-point range, and star Kevin Pittsnogle went scoreless.
  - Women's:
    - #6 Maryland 98, No. 1 North Carolina 95 (OT): The Terrapins' Ashleigh Newman hits a desperation three-pointer at the buzzer to force overtime, and the Terps go on to hand the Tar Heels their first loss of the season.
    - #3 LSU 72, No. 5 Tennessee 69: Behind 32 points from Seimone Augustus, the Lady Tigers become the first SEC team to defeat the Lady Vols in Knoxville since December 1996.

== 8 February 2006 (Wednesday) ==
- American football – ESPN announces that they have hired Mike Tirico, Joe Theismann, and PTI's Tony Kornheiser to be the new announcers of Monday Night Football, which will air on the cable sports network starting next season. The move means that Al Michaels, who has been with ABC for almost 30 years, is now free to join John Madden on NBC's Sunday night NFL broadcasts. In exchange for Michaels, NBC gave ABC/ESPN expanded Olympic highlights, coverage of the Friday Ryder Cup matches starting in 2008, and gave Disney the rights to Oswald the Lucky Rabbit, a character created by Walt Disney and owned by Universal.

== 7 February 2006 (Tuesday) ==
- Football:
  - 2006 African Cup of Nations – Semifinals
    - S1: Egypt 2–1 Senegal
    - S2: Ivory Coast 1–0 Nigeria
  - The FIFA Disciplinary Committee hands down its decisions regarding the fracas between Turkey and Switzerland following the second leg of their World Cup qualifying playoff in Istanbul on 16 November 2005 (FIFA.com):
    - The Turkish Football Federation is fined CHF 200,000 (US$154,000).
    - The national team must play their next six competitive home matches behind closed doors at a site in a UEFA country and at least 500 km from the Turkish border.
    - Turkey assistant Mehmet Özdilek is banned from football for 12 months and fined CHF 15,000.
    - Turkey players Alpay Özalan and Emre Belözoğlu and Switzerland player Benjamin Huggel are all banned for their national team's next six competitive matches and fined CHF 15,000 each.
    - Turkey player Serkan Balcı and Swiss physiotherapist Stephan Meyer receive two-match bans and fines of CHF 5,000 and 6,500 respectively. Unlike the other punishments, these cannot be appealed to the Court of Arbitration for Sport.
- Ice hockey – Former NHL player and Phoenix Coyotes assistant coach Rick Tocchet is implicated for being in charge of a gambling ring that includes several NHL players, as well as Wayne Gretzky's wife, Janet Jones.
- College Basketball NCAA Top 25: No. 2 Duke 87, No. 24 North Carolina 83: JJ Redick scores 35 points (22 in the second half alone), the first time he has scored more than 20 in the hostile "Dean Dome", as the Blue Devils survive a 17-point comeback from the Tar Heels. Reyshaun Terry led the Heels with 17 points.

== 6 February 2006 (Monday) ==
- NCAA Men's College Basketball:
  - In today's latest AP poll, the top five teams remain the same—UConn, Duke, Memphis, Villanova, and Gonzaga.

== 5 February 2006 (Sunday) ==
- Super Bowl XL at Ford Field, Detroit, Michigan
  - Pittsburgh Steelers 21, Seattle Seahawks 10: A 75-yard touchdown run by Willie Parker and a 43-yard touchdown pass from Antwaan Randle El to MVP Hines Ward help the Steelers win their fifth NFL title, joining the Dallas Cowboys and San Francisco 49ers. Jerome Bettis, who played today's game in his hometown, announces his retirement after the game. (Yahoo! Sports)
- Bandy: World Championships:
  - Final: Russia defeat Sweden, 3–2, to win the world championship.
- Rugby Union: 2006 Six Nations Championship
  - Scotland 20–16 France
    - Scotland beat France at Murrayfield for the first time in a decade, upsetting the widely fancied French team.
- Team handball: 2006 European Men's Championship:
  - Final: Spain 23–31 France
    - France win their first European handball title with an eight-goal advantage in the final, holding Spain to 23 goals; Nikola Karabatic nets 11 goals for the victors. (in French) Yahoo! France Sport
- NCAA Basketball
  - (17) Georgetown Hoyas 61, (9) Pitt 58: The Hoyas passed up the Panthers in the Big East standings, and almost passed them up in the next morning's AP poll, which boosted the Hoyas to No. 15 and dropped Pitt to #14.
  - Kansas 59, (19) Oklahoma 58: The Jayhawks, who stunned the Sooners at home, are now in second place in the Big 12, argued that the victory demonstrated that they were underrated.

== 4 February 2006 (Saturday) ==
- Football: 2006 African Cup of Nations – Quarterfinal
  - Q3: Cameroon 1–1 Ivory Coast (a.e.t.)
    - Ivory Coast win penalty shootout, 12 goals to 11. The 24-shot shootout is believed to be a record in international competition.
  - Q4: Nigeria 1–1 Tunisia (a.e.t.)
    - Nigeria win 6–5 on penalties.
- Rugby Union: 2006 Six Nations Championship
  - Ireland 26–16 Italy
    - Ireland were unimpressive in what was to have been an easy victory.
  - England 47–13 Wales
    - England easily defeated the injury-hit reigning Six Nations champions.
- National Football League: Six new members are named to the Pro Football Hall of Fame, the most since 2001. First-time candidates Troy Aikman, Warren Moon, and Reggie White are selected along with veterans' committee candidates John Madden and Rayfield Wright, plus Giants linebacker Harry Carson, who earns his selection in his seventh year as a finalist for the Hall.

== 3 February 2006 (Friday) ==
- Football: 2006 African Cup of Nations – Quarterfinal
  - Q1: Egypt 4–1 Congo DR
  - Q2: Guinea 2–3 Senegal Senegal go through to the semi-finals when both teams score in time added on. There is a scuffle involving players of both sides in the centre of the pitch for several minutes at the end of the match.

== 1 February 2006 (Wednesday) ==
- Cricket – Pakistan defeat India by 341 runs in the third and final Test in Karachi, winning the three-Test series 1–0. Scorecard.
