= West Indian cricket team in New Zealand in 2005–06 =

West Indies in New Zealand in 2005–06
	West Indies	New Zealand
- Dates: 16 February – 29 March 2006
Captains	Shivnarine Chanderpaul	Stephen Fleming

Test series
- Result: New Zealand won the 3-match series 2–0
Most runs	Chris Gayle (235)	Stephen Fleming (144)
Most wickets	Shane Bond (8); James Franklin (8); Chris Martin (8)	Ian Bradshaw (7); Fidel Edwards (7)
- Player of the series: no award

One Day International series
- Results: New Zealand won the 5-match series 4–1
Most runs	Runako Morton (229)	Nathan Astle (295)
Most wickets	Ian Bradshaw (9); Dwayne Smith (9)	Shane Bond (10)
- Player of the series: no award

Twenty20 International series
- Results: New Zealand won the 1-match series 1–0
Most runs	Shiv Chanderpaul (26); Daren Ganga (26)	Lou Vincent (42)
Most wickets	Ian Bradshaw (2); Dwayne Bravo (2); Chris Gayle (2); Dwayne Smith (2)	Shane Bond (2); Scott Styris (2)
- Player of the series: Dwayne Smith

The West Indies cricket team toured New Zealand in February and March 2006 as part of the 2005–06 New Zealand cricket season.

Coming into the series the New Zealand cricket team (Black Caps) and the West Indies had very different fortunes. The Black Caps had won their recent ODI series with Sri Lanka 3–1 whilst the West Indies, in November, were whitewashed by the Australians 3–0, who retained the Frank Worrell Trophy.

Both New Zealand and the West Indies were looking to win as many of the One Day Internationals as possible to improve their rankings – New Zealand and the West Indies were, as of 29 January, ranked fourth and eighth respectively. Being ranked in the top six teams meant avoiding having to compete in the preliminary round of that year's ICC Champions Trophy.

New Zealand vice-captain Daniel Vettori believed his side was the favourite for the series.

"I wouldn't say we're overwhelming favourites but I think we generally start as favourites against most teams at home. Touring teams often take a bit of time to adapt to our conditions and I think we saw a bit of that in the way Sri Lanka began the most recent series. The Windies haven't played any one-day cricket for a while and we're in the middle of our season, so I suppose we are the team to beat. But having said that, if they find their feet they're a very good side and we'll have to play very well to win."

The West Indian team arrived in Auckland on 10 February. Soon after arriving after a marathon journey that took almost four days West Indian coach Bennett King accused the ICC Future Tours Programme of "benefiting the rich at the expense of the poor."

The tour consisted of 5 One Day International, 3 Tests and a Twenty20 international. The Twenty20 was Chris Cairns' last international cricket game in New Zealand colours.

== Squads ==
ODIs

New Zealand		West Indies
Stephen Fleming	CPT, LHB, RM	Shivnarine Chanderpaul	CPT, LHB, LB
Daniel Vettori	LHB, SLA	Ramnaresh Sarwan	RHB, LB
Nathan Astle	RHB, RFM	Chris Gayle	LHB, OB
Shane Bond	RHB, RF	Wavell Hinds	LHB, RFM
James Franklin	LHB, LMF	Daren Ganga	RHB, OB
Peter Fulton	RHB, RFM	Runako Morton	RHB, OB
Jamie How	RHB, RFM	Dwayne Bravo	RHB, RMF
Hamish Marshall	RHB, RFM	Dwayne Smith	RHB, RFM
Michael Mason	RHB, RFM	Denesh Ramdin	WKT, RHB
Brendon McCullum	WKT, RHB	Rawl Lewis	RHB, LB
Jeetan Patel	RHB, OB	Ian Bradshaw	LHB, LFM
Scott Styris	RHB, RFM	Jerome Taylor	RHB, RF
Lou Vincent	RHB, RFM	Fidel Edwards	RHB, RF
		Deighton Butler	LHB, LMF

== Fixtures ==
=== February ===
- 16 Twenty20 Auckland note: Chris Cairns' last international match.
- 18 1st ODI (D/N) Wellington
- 22 2nd ODI Queenstown
- 25 3rd ODI Christchurch

=== March ===
- 1 4th ODI Napier
- 4 5th ODI Auckland
- 9 -13 1st Test Auckland
- 17 -21 2nd Test Wellington
- 25 -29 3rd Test Napier

== Limited overs matches ==
=== Twenty20: 16 February in Auckland ===
16 February 2006
19:00 (D/N)

West Indies; 126/7 (20 overs)	v	New Zealand; 126/8 (20 overs)
Shivnarine Chanderpaul 26 (33); Shane Bond 2/15 (4 overs)		Lou Vincent 42 (57); Dwayne Smith 2/9 (3.2 overs)

Match tied, New Zealand won bowl-out (3–0, NZ X X X, WI O O O)
Eden Park, Auckland
Umpires: Billy Bowden and Tony Hill
Player of the match: Dwayne Smith (WI)

- New Zealand won the toss and elected to field

The New Zealanders won the toss, playing in the beige uniforms of the 80s, and sent the West Indies in. The "Windies" scored a modest 126–7 off their 20 overs, a run rate of only 6.30 an over. In reply, Lou Vincent scored 42 off 37, the highest score in the match. New Zealand looked to have the game in the bag, needing just 47 off nine overs. However, in the next 7 overs, Dwayne Smith and Chris Gayle had only 31 runs scored of their bowling, reducing the Black Caps to 110–8. New Zealand then required 17 to win off the last over and the game looked beyond them. A James Franklin six off the second ball changed things and off the last ball, New Zealand required 5 to win and 4 to tie with tailender Shane Bond facing. Bond hit a four, sending the game into a bowl off. The first 12 balls missed the stumps and it took two hits from last ball hero Shane Bond to break the deadlock and then a hit from Scott Styris gave New Zealand a 3–0 win in the bowl off.

=== First ODI: 18 February in Wellington ===
18 February 2006
14:30 (D/N)

New Zealand; 288/9 (50 overs)	v	West Indies; 207 (47.3 overs)
Nathan Astle 90 (106); Chris Gayle 2/42 (10 overs)		Ramnaresh Sarwan 56 (83); Daniel Vettori 2/29 (10 overs)

New Zealand won by 81 runs.
Westpac Stadium, Wellington
Umpires: Rudi Koertzen and Tony Hill
Player of the match: Nathan Astle (New Zealand)

- New Zealand won the toss and elected to bat.

New Zealand recorded a comprehensive victory with Nathan Astle scoring 90 and New Zealand ending up on 288–9 off 50 overs. West Indies never looked like winning, with wickets falling at regular intervals, despite Ramnaresh Sarwan and Daren Ganga both scoring 50s. Vice Captain Daniel Vettori was the pick of the New Zealand bowlers with 2–29 off 10 overs.

=== Second ODI: 22 February in Queenstown ===
22 February 2006
10:30

West Indies; 200/9 (50 overs)	v	New Zealand; 204/7 (42 overs)
Wavell Hinds 76 (88); Shane Bond 2/23 (10 overs)		Daniel Vettori 53* (56); Ian Bradshaw 2/31 (10 overs)

New Zealand won by 3 wickets (with 48 balls remaining).
Queenstown Events Centre, Queenstown
Umpires: Rudi Koertzen and Billy Bowden
Player of the match: Daniel Vettori (New Zealand)

- New Zealand won the toss and elected to field.

New Zealand won the toss and elected to field first. Good opening spells from James Franklin and Shane Bond restricted the West Indies to 10–2 of 10.1 overs. Wavell Hinds was the only West Indian batsman who looked dangerous, scoring 76 off 88 balls. Bond was the pick of the New Zealand bowlers, who did well to restrict the West Indies to 200–9 off 50 overs. The West Indies struck back early in New Zealand's innings, leaving the hosts struggling on 13–4 after 3.2 overs. This was thanks to the bowling of Ian Bradshaw and Fidel Edwards who both got two wickets. However, sensible batting from Peter Fulton (49), Brendon McCullum (45) and vice-captain Daniel Vettori (53*) saw New Zealand home with 3 wickets in hand. Vettori was awarded Man of the match for his allround figures of 53 not out and 28–1 off ten overs.

=== Third ODI: 25 February in Christchurch ===
25 February 2006
14:30 (D/N)

New Zealand; 276/6 (50 overs)	v	West Indies; 255 (49 overs)
Nathan Astle 118* (126); Ian Bradshaw 3/41 (8 overs)		Ramnaresh Sarwan 65 (78); Jeetan Patel 3/42 (8 overs)

New Zealand won by 21 runs.
Jade Stadium, Christchurch
Umpires: Rudi Koertzen and Billy Bowden
Player of the match: Nathan Astle (New Zealand)

- New Zealand won the toss and elected to bat.
- New Zealand won the 5 match series, 3–0.

New Zealand won the toss and decided to bat first, going less than five an over for most of the innings. However some late hitting by Nathan Astle, who finished on 118 not out and hit three sixes off the last three balls of the innings, got New Zealand to 276–6. Ian Bradshaw was the pick of the West Indian bowlers, with 3–41 off 8 overs. In the West Indies innings, Chris Gayle scored a 23 ball 38, putting the run rate above 6 an over. However Daniel Vettori brought the Kiwis back into the game with two wickets in one over. Later on, Astle backed up his batting effort with a one handed catch on the rope. The West Indies finished all out at the end of 49 overs. Astle was named Man of the Match for the second time in three matches. New Zealand have now won the series.

=== Fourth ODI: 1 March in Napier ===
1 March 2006
10:30

New Zealand; 324/6 (50 overs)	v	West Indies; 233/8 (50 overs)
Lou Vincent 102 (117); Chris Gayle 3/50 (10 overs)		Runako Morton 110 (155); Kyle Mills 3/45 (10 overs)

New Zealand won by 91 runs.
McLean Park, Napier
Umpires: Rudi Koertzen and Billy Bowden
Player of the match: Lou Vincent (New Zealand)

- West Indies won the toss and elected to field.

The West Indies won the tost and decided to field. New Zealand got off to a good start, with an opening partnership of 106 between Lou Vincent and captain Stephen Fleming. Nathan Astle continued his fine form, with 81 runs. Debutant Ross Taylor made 15 off ten balls before being runout. Some late hitting from Brendon McCullum got New Zealand past the 300 mark. Chris Gayle and Fidel Edwards were the West Indies best bowlers, with respective figures of 3–50 and 0–23, with each bowling 10 overs.

The West Indies found themselves in trouble early, losing Gayle for 5. The West Indies never looked competitive, with only Runako Morton getting past fifty, going on to make 110 not out off 155. Kyle Mills was New Zealands best bowler, with 3–45 while Daniel Vettori continued his economical series, claiming 1–32 off ten overs.

=== Fifth ODI: 4 March in Auckland ===
4 March 2006
14:30 (D/N)

New Zealand; 233 (49.3 overs)	v	West Indies; 234/7 (49.4 overs)
Scott Styris 90 (119); Dwayne Smith 5/45 (10 overs)		Shivnarine Chanderpaul 41 (47); Shane Bond 3/32 (9.4 overs)

West Indies won by 3 wickets (with 2 balls remaining).
Eden Park, Auckland
Umpires: Daryl Harper and Tony Hill
Player of the match: Dwayne Smith (West Indies)

- New Zealand won the toss and elected to bat.
- New Zealand won the 5 match series, 4–1.

New Zealand won the toss, electing to bat, resting Daniel Vettori, Jamie How and Michael Mason who all played in the first ODI, as they had already won the series. New Zealand were in trouble early, with Lou Vincent and Nathan Astle both being dismissed before the side reached double figures. Despite 90 from Scott Styris, New Zealand failure at creating partnerships left them all out on 233. Dwayne Smith picked up 5–45.

The West Indies played very conservatively in the first ten overs, scoring just 10, in the hopes of not losing a wicket to Shane Bond. The West Indies then looked to score after that, with every batsmen making a contribution. The West Indies managed to get 234 in the final over, with 3 wickets in hand and 2 balls to spare.

== Test Matches ==
=== First Test (9–13 March) ===
9–13 March 2006
Scorecard

New Zealand	v	West Indies
275 (69.1 overs); SB Styris 103* (122); IDR Bradshaw 3–73 (23.1 overs)		257 (71.2 overs); RR Sarwan 62 (108); CS Martin 3–80 (17 overs)
272 (103.1 overs); BB McCullum 74 (126); CH Gayle 4–71 (30.1 overs)		263 (102.3 overs); D Ganga 95 (231); SE Bond 5–69 (27.3 overs)

New Zealand won by 27 runs
Eden Park, Auckland, New Zealand
Umpires: DJ Harper (AUS) and RE Koertzen (SA)
Player of the match: SE Bond (NZ)

- West Indies won the toss and elected to field.
- PG Fulton and JM How (both NZ) and IDR Bradshaw (WI) made their Test debuts.

=== Second Test (17–20 March) ===
17–20 March 2006
Scorecard

West Indies	v	New Zealand
192 (61.4 overs); RS Morton 63 (117); JEC Franklin 5–53 (20 overs)		372 (106.3 overs); SP Fleming 97 (131); FH Edwards 5–65 (15.3 overs)
215 (90.5 overs); CH Gayle 68 (145); KD Mills 3–29 (9.5 overs)		37/0 (8.1 overs); HJH Marshall 23* (30)

New Zealand won by 10 wickets
Basin Reserve, Wellington, New Zealand
Umpires: MR Benson (ENG) and DJ Harper (AUS)
Player of the match: SP Fleming (NZ)

- West Indies won the toss and elected to bat.
- The match was scheduled for five days but completed in four.

=== Third Test (25–29 March) ===
25–29 March 2006
Scorecard

West Indies	v	New Zealand
256/4 (78.1 overs); BC Lara 83 (107); NJ Astle 1–23 (14 overs)

Match drawn
McLean Park, Napier, New Zealand
Umpires: MR Benson (ENG) and I Howell (SA)
Player of the match: No award

- New Zealand won the toss and elected to field.
- There was no play on the third, fourth, and fifth days.

Despite the Test Series already in the bag for New Zealand, West Indies started the third Test with renewed vigour until the first day was stopped after only 27 overs, with the score at 95/1. The second day seemed more promising until, after 52 overs bad rain stopped play – the third and fourth day followed suit until the game was abandoned.
