= Indian cricket team in the West Indies in 2006 =

India in West Indies in 2006
	India	West Indies
- Dates: 16 May – 4 July 2006
Captains	Rahul Dravid	Brian Lara

Test series
- Result: India won the 4-match series 1–0
Most runs	Rahul Dravid (497)	Daren Ganga (344)
Most wickets	Anil Kumble (23)	Corey Collymore (15)
- Player of the series: Rahul Dravid (Ind)

One Day International series
- Results: West Indies won the 5-match series 4–1
Most runs	Virender Sehwag (237)	Ramnaresh Sarwan (273)
Most wickets	Ajit Agarkar (9)	Dwayne Bravo (8)
- Player of the series: Ramnaresh Sarwan (WI)

India toured the West Indies during the 2006 international cricket season. India were ranked highly above the West Indies in both the ICC Test Championship as well as the ICC ODI Championship but the latter team had the favour of beating Zimbabwe 5–0 in a series of One Day International matches earlier in the month. West Indies eventually emerged as winners of this ODI series, taking it 4–1 after losing the first match in the final over.

India had not won a Test series in the West Indies for 35 years, but India defeated the West Indies 1–0 in the Test series. Rahul Dravid, the Indian squad captain, was awarded the Man of the Series award for his performance.

Former West Indian fast bowler and commentator, Michael Holding, said between the ODIs and Tests that the West Indies ODI series win was an event that "nobody had foreseen".

== Schedule ==
Date	Match	Venue
May
16	Tour Match	Jamaica
18	1st ODI	Jamaica
20	2nd ODI	Jamaica
23	3rd ODI	St Kitts
26	4th ODI	Trinidad
28	5th ODI	Trinidad
30–31	Tour Match	Antigua
June
2–6	1st Test	Antigua
10–14	2nd Test	St Lucia
22–26	3rd Test	St Kitts
30–4 Jul	4th Test	Jamaica

== Squads ==
Players were selected for both ODIs and Tests unless otherwise specified.

India
- Rahul Dravid c
- M. S. Dhoni wk
- Dinesh Karthik wk (Tests)
- Ajit Agarkar (ODIs)
- Harbhajan Singh
- Mohammad Kaif
- Anil Kumble (Tests)
- Wasim Jaffer (Tests)
- V. V. S. Laxman (Tests)
- Munaf Patel
- Irfan Pathan
- Ramesh Powar
- Suresh Raina
- Sreesanth
- Virender Sehwag
- R. P. Singh (ODIs)
- V. R. V. Singh (Tests)
- Robin Uthappa (ODIs)
- Venugopal Rao (ODIs)
- Yuvraj Singh
West Indies
- Brian Lara c
- Carlton Baugh wk (ODIs)
- Denesh Ramdin wk
- Ian Bradshaw
- Dwayne Bravo
- Shivnarine Chanderpaul
- Sewnarine Chattergoon (ODIs)
- Pedro Collins (Tests)
- Corey Collymore
- Fidel Edwards (ODIs)
- Chris Gayle
- Daren Ganga (Tests)
- Wavell Hinds (ODIs)
- Dave Mohammed
- Runako Morton
- Marlon Samuels
- Ramnaresh Sarwan
- Dwayne Smith (ODIs)
- Jerome Taylor

== One-Day Matches ==
=== Tour Match (16 May) ===
Indians 7/289 (50) def Jamaica 173 (45) by 116 runs.

=== First ODI ===
18 May
Scorecard

West Indies; 251/6 (45 Overs)	v	India; 254/5 (44.5 Overs)
Chris Gayle 123 (130); Ajit Agarkar 2/38 (9 overs)		Rahul Dravid 105 (102); Ian Bradshaw 2/40 (9 overs)

India won by 5 wickets
Sabina Park, Kingston, Jamaica
Umpires: Asad Rauf (Pak) and Steve Bucknor (WI)
Player of the match: Rahul Dravid (Ind)

- India won the toss and elected to field.

India won the toss and captain Rahul Dravid elected to field first, after five overs were cut off each side's innings due to heavy overnight rain. West Indies hit 251 runs for 6 wickets, with Chris Gayle contributing nearly half the total, 123, before he was out with five overs remaining to Ajit Agarkar, who got the most wickets for India, claiming two for 38. However, India also had an opener contributing a century, with Rahul Dravid bringing up his hundred in 99 balls, eventually ending with 105 off 102. Dravid paired up with Mohammad Kaif to add 123 for the fourth wicket, before Dwayne Bravo had Dravid caught, leaving India with 43 to get from the last 37 balls; with two fours and a six from Mahendra Singh Dhoni, and Kaif hitting 16 off his last 16 deliveries, India made it to the target with a ball to spare.

=== Second ODI ===
20 May
Scorecard

West Indies; 198/9 (50 overs)	v	India; 197 (49.4 overs)
Ramnaresh Sarwan 98* (138); Irfan Pathan 3/45 (9 overs)		Yuvraj Singh 93 (121); Ian Bradshaw 3/33 (10 overs)

West Indies won by 1 run
Sabina Park, Kingston, Jamaica
Umpires: Billy Doctrove (WI) and Asad Rauf (Pak)
Player of the match: Ramnaresh Sarwan (WI)

- India won the toss and elected to field.

India won the toss and captain Rahul Dravid elected to field first, looking for his 18th continuous win batting second, but it was not to be his day as Dwayne Bravo delivered a "clever slower ball" which went through Yuvraj Singh's wicket, leaving him bowled and India all out for 197 needing 199 to win.

West Indies lost both openers with one run, sending Brian Lara in to bat with Ramnaresh Sarwan. Captain Lara was caught off Pathan for 14, however, which was to be the fourth-highest total of West Indies' innings. The second-highest was 21, from Carlton Baugh, but due to an unbeaten 98 from Ramnaresh Sarwan, which later resulted in Man of the Match honours, the West Indies' total read 198 for nine, with Sarwan and Jerome Taylor adding 34 off 20 balls for the ninth wicket before Fidel Edwards scored the final run of the innings.

In reply, India started better than West Indies, making 37 for the first two wickets, which were catches off Ian Bradshaw's bowling. Two more wickets followed, with Fidel Edwards and Jerome Taylor picking up one each, but at 60 for four in the 17th over, India were still 17 ahead of West Indies' score for the same number of wickets. Then, like in the West Indian innings, the fifth-wicket stand was the highest of the game. However, the 64 runs came at a rate of 3.49 an over, somewhat short of the required four to win, and after Suresh Raina's dismissal Dhoni and Agarkar followed within the next three overs.

India now had three wickets in hand and 64 to get, but Ramesh Powar batted for eight overs together with Yuvraj Singh, as the pair cut 43 off the total, Powar contributing 12. Powar was caught off Marlon Samuels' bowling, however, as the spinner picked up his second wicket, and Chris Gayle then held a return catch off Harbhajan Singh two overs later. That left India with 12 runs to get off 10 balls; the remainder of Gayle's over went for one run, and India needed eleven off the last over, which was to be bowled by Dwayne Bravo (who had only bowled three of the 49 previous overs). Munaf Patel faced the first ball, got it away for a single, before Yuvraj Singh hit two fours to leave himself with two runs to get off three balls, only to be clean bowled off the last delivery.

=== Third ODI ===
23 May
Scorecard

India; 245/9 (50 overs)	v	West Indies; 248/6 (49.5 overs)
Virender Sehwag 97 (83); Ian Bradshaw 2/40 (8 overs)		Ramnaresh Sarwan 115* (119); Ajit Agarkar 2/32 (10 overs)

West Indies won by 4 wickets
Warner Park, Basseterre, Saint Kitts and Nevis
Umpires: Asad Rauf (Pak) and Steve Bucknor (WI)
Player of the match: Ramnaresh Sarwan (WI)

- India won the toss and elected to bat.

=== Fourth ODI ===
26 May
Scorecard

India; 217/7 (50 overs)	v	West Indies; 218/4 (44 overs)
Mohammad Kaif 62 (84); Dwayne Bravo 3/32 (5 overs)		Brian Lara 69 (97); Ramesh Powar 2/56 (9 overs)

West Indies won by 6 wickets
Queen's Park Oval, Port of Spain, Trinidad
Umpires: Simon Taufel (Aus) and Billy Doctrove (WI)
Player of the match: Dwayne Bravo (WI)

- West Indies won the toss and elected to field.

=== Fifth ODI ===
28 May
Scorecard

West Indies; 255/6 (50 overs)	v	India; 236 (48 overs)
Dwayne Bravo 62* (44); Ajit Agarkar 2/44 (10 overs)		Virender Sehwag 95 (103); Dave Mohammed 3/39 (9 overs)

West Indies won by 19 runs
Queen's Park Oval, Port of Spain, Trinidad
Umpires: Steve Bucknor (WI) and Simon Taufel (Aus)
Player of the match: Dwayne Bravo (WI)

- India won the toss and elected to field.

== Tour match ==
=== Two-day: Antigua and Barbuda v Indians ===
30–31 May
Scorecard

Antigua and Barbuda	v	Indians
300 (72.2 overs); Sylvester Joseph 128* (179); S. Sreesanth 3/46 (15 overs)		311/9 (96 overs); VVS Laxman 72 (122); Justin Athanaze 3/79 (21 overs)

Match drawn
Police Recreation Ground, St. John's, Antigua
Umpires: Alvin James-Knight and Myron James

- Antigua and Barbuda won the toss elected to bat first.

== Test series ==
=== First Test ===
2–6 June
Scorecard

India	v	West Indies
241 (92.5 overs); Rahul Dravid 49 (173); Dwayne Bravo 4/40 (22 overs)		371 (98.3 overs); Chris Gayle 72 (91); Munaf Patel 3/80 (28 overs)
521/6d (150.5 overs); Wasim Jaffer 212 (399); Dave Mohammed 3/162 (29.5 overs)		298/9 (95 overs); Chris Gayle 69 (188); Anil Kumble 4/107 (34 overs)

Match drawn
Antigua Recreation Ground, St. John's, Antigua
Umpires: Asad Rauf (Pak) and Simon Taufel (Aus)
Player of the match: Wasim Jaffer (Ind)

- India won the toss and elected to bat.
- V. R. V. Singh (Ind) made his Test debut.

=== Second Test ===
10–14 June
Scorecard

India	v	West Indies
588/8 (148.2 Overs); Virender Sehwag 180 (190); Pedro Collins 4/116 (28 Overs)		215 (85.1 Overs); Chris Gayle 46 (106); Virender Sehwag 3/33 (16.1 Overs)
		294/7 (119 Overs) (f/o); Brian Lara 120 (307); Anil Kumble 3/98 (42 Overs)

Match drawn
Beausejour Stadium, Gros Islet, St Lucia
Umpires: Asad Rauf (Pak) and Simon Taufel (Aus)
Player of the match: Virender Sehwag (Ind)

- India won the toss and elected to bat.

=== Third Test ===
22–26 June
Scorecard

West Indies	v	India
581 (170 overs); Daren Ganga 135 (294); Harbhajan Singh 5/147 (44 overs)		362 (107 overs); VVS Laxman 100 (231); Corey Collymore 3/63 (25 overs)
172/6d (32 overs); Daren Ganga 66* (75); Anil Kumble 3/60 (12 overs)		298/4 (85 overs); R Dravid 68* (131); Pedro Collins 2/66 (18 overs)

Match drawn
Warner Park Sporting Complex, Basseterre, St Kitts
Umpires: Brian Jerling (RSA) and Rudi Koertzen (RSA)
Player of the match: Daren Ganga (WI)

- West Indies won the toss and elected to bat.

=== Fourth Test ===
30 June – 4 July
Scorecard

India	v	West Indies
200 (87.4 overs); Rahul Dravid 81 (215); Jerome Taylor 5/50 (18.4 overs)		103 (33.3 overs); Daren Ganga 40 (63); Harbhajan Singh 5/13 (4.3 overs)
171 (65.1 overs); Rahul Dravid 68 (166); Corey Collymore 5/48 (24.1 overs)		219 (69.4 overs); Denesh Ramdin 62 (85); Anil Kumble 6/78 (15 overs)

India won by 49 runs
Sabina Park, Kingston, Jamaica
Umpires: Brian Jerling (RSA) and Rudi Koertzen (RSA)
Player of the match: Rahul Dravid (Ind)

- India won the toss and elected to bat.
