= Daren Ganga =

West Indian cricketer

Personal information
- Born: 14 January 1979 (age 47); Barrackpore, Trinidad and Tobago
- Batting: Right-handed
- Bowling: Right arm off break
- Role: Batsman

International information
- National side: West Indies (1998–2008)
- Test debut: 26 December 1998 v South Africa
- Last Test: 10 January 2008 v South Africa
- ODI debut: 2 February 1999 v South Africa
- Last ODI: 10 December 2006 v Pakistan
- Only T20I (cap 5): 16 February 2006 v New Zealand

Domestic team information
- Years: Team
- 1996/97–2012: Trinidad and Tobago

Career statistics
Competition	Tests	ODIs	T20I	FC
Matches	48	35	1	172
Runs scored	2,160	843	26	10,137
Batting average	25.71	25.54	26.00	37.13
100s/50s	3/9	0/9	0/0	23/48
Top score	135	71	26	265
Balls bowled	186	1	0	622
Wickets	1	0	0	4
Bowling average	106.00	–	–	83.50
5 wickets in innings	0	–	0	0
10 wickets in match	0	–	0	0
Best bowling	1/20	–	–	1/7
Catches/stumpings	30/–	11/–	0/–	112/–
- Source: CricketArchive, 26 February 2023

Daren Ganga (born 14 January 1979) is a former Trinidadian cricketer. He was a right-handed top order batsman and part-time right-arm off spinner. He was named the 2006 West Indies Players' Association 'Test player of the year', Ganga captained the Windies' youth, A and senior teams together with Trinidad and Tobago. Ganga is also the most successful captain ever, with four titles, in West Indian List A tournaments.

== Cricket career ==
=== Debut season for Trinidad ===
Ganga made his first-class debut for Trinidad and Tobago on 21 February 1997, against Guyana at Queen's Park Oval aged 18. His teammates included Phil Simmons, Brian Lara, Mervyn Dillon and Ian Bishop. He only managed one half century in the series, an innings of 54 against Guyana. He made his breakthrough in the following regional first class season. After making 68 against Jamaica earlier in the season he came into Trinidad and Tobago's final game with his side needing a big score. Playing against Barbados, Ganga came in batting at number 4 with T&T in trouble at 3 for 33. He then top scored with 138 and to his country win the game by 1 wicket.

In August 1998, Ganga was named in the West Indies squad for their tour of South Africa. At the age of 19 he was the youngest Trinidad and Tobago player in 35 years to make the Test side.

=== Early international career ===
Ganga was named in the side for the 3rd Test at Durban and batted at 6, behind established players like Lara, Hooper and Chanderpaul. In the first innings he made 28 from 94 balls before being bowled by Shaun Pollock. He had a dismal tour thereafter, and was dismissed by Pollock on several occasions.

In November 1999 Ganga represented the West Indies A against India A before touring New Zealand. He toured New Zealand with the West Indies in December and made a hundred against Auckland. Ganga though didn't play in the test series.

He later appeared for the West Indies A in their 2000 series against Pakistan, where he made a pair of 50's, and then against South Africa A. Ganga soon earn a recall for the Windies' 2000/01 tour of Australia. Opening the batting he had a steady, but unspectacular tour.

=== 2001 to 2003 ===
In July 2001 Ganga toured Zimbabwe with the West Indies. He had been in good form in domestic cricket for Trinidad and Tobago, scoring a century in his opening game against Barbados and making 80 against South Africa for the Busta Cup XI. The Zimbabwean tour was a success for Ganga, he started with 79 against Zimbabwe A and in the 1st Test at Bulawayo he passed 50 for the first time in Test cricket, finishing with 89. The tour concluded with a stop over in Kenya where they played a sum of ODI and first-class fixtures. Ganga made a century in the second of the two first-class games.

Later in the year the West Indies toured Sri Lanka. He contributed 47 and 33 in the 1st Test but wasn't as prolific in the final two tests of the series. In January 2002 West Indies faced Pakistan in a two match test series at Sharjah. During the 2nd Test Ganga scored 65 in the first innings.

In May 2002 he was named captain of the Windies A squad for a summer tour of England. With Ganga at the helm the Windies A drew against Nottinghamshire, Lancashire, India and Somerset, lost to Sri Lanka, Kent and Derbyshire and won against British Universities, Sussex, Yorkshire, Warwickshire and Gloucestershire. Ganga was recalled for a December 2002 tour of Bangladesh. He made 63 in the second test then went on to play a full season with Trinidad and Tobago. He was previously unable to do such given his commitments to the Windies A and youth teams.

=== Breakthrough against Australia ===
Australia toured the West Indies in April and May 2003. With the Australian team missing Shane Warne and without Glenn McGrath for most of the series, Ganga made his maiden Test century in the 1st Test at Georgetown. He batted at number 3 and made 113 before being dismissed by Darren Lehmann.

The next Test was at his home ground, Queen's Park Oval in Trinidad. In good batting conditions the Australians had put on 576 runs in their first innings and the West Indies, having lost opener Devon Smith for a duck were staring down the barrel when Ganga came to the crease. In an innings which took 326 minutes, Ganga scored 117 and completed his second Test century in two innings against the Australians.

=== Captaincy ===
Ganga returned to the African continent in 2003/04 for a Test series against both Zimbabwe and South Africa. He struggled in his 4 Tests in South Africa despite making 60 in his opening innings. Makhaya Ntini dismissed him 6 times and he finished the series with 122 runs. Back home, in April 2004 he took part in his first series against England. He took part in the 3rd and 4th Tests without success and again lost his place in the team.

During the 2004/05 regional first class season Ganga compiled 610 runs, which included 265 against the Leeward Islands. He also captained T&T, whilst scoring 273 runs, to eventually win the 2004–05 Regional One-Day Competition. In July 2005, he was voted Trinidad and Tobago's Cricketer of the Year. Ganga also captained the Windies A team in an away series against Sri Lanka A. During that series he scored both a century and a 99.

As T&T's captain he later made 3 hundreds in the 2007 Carib Beer Cup, where in the final game he scored 120 and 44 to share the Man of the Match award with Ravi Rampaul. Trinidad and Tobago eventually won the game to claim their first regional first class championship since 1985. Ganga was recalled in March 2006 for the Windies' upcoming tour of New Zealand. He made 95 in the 1st Test at Auckland, missing out on his hundred when dismissed off the bowling of Nathan Astle. The following month he was one of six players shortlisted for the captaincy of the West Indies cricket team. The other candidates were Denesh Ramdin, Chris Gayle, Ramnaresh Sarwan, Sylvester Joseph, and Brian Lara. They opted for the experience of Lara and Sarwan was chosen as vice captain. In June the West Indies played a Test series at home against India and Ganga put in a Man of the Match performance in the 3rd Test at Basseterre, St Kitts and Nevis. Opening the batting he made a career best 135 in the first innings and followed it up with an unbeaten 66 to help his side draw the Test. His good form continued on the tour of Pakistan later in the year where he made a pair of 80's.

Ganga later skippered Trinidad and Tobago to a KFC Cup title, defeating the Windward Islands by 5 runs in the cup final at the Arnos Vale Stadium, Kingstown, Saint Vincent and the Grenadines. With Brian Lara having retired, and after steering T&T to two regional one day titles in three years, Ganga was appointed West Indies vice captain to Ramnaresh Sarwan for the upcoming 2007 summer tour to England. He went on to skipper Trinidad and Tobago to the 2008 Stanford 20/20 title and later romp to a seven wicket victory, over Barbados in the final, to lift the 2008–09 WICB Cup. With that win, T&T qualified for the 2009 Champions League Twenty20 where as captain Ganga steered them to the tournament's runners up spot.

== Personal life ==
Ganga is of South Asian descent, his family migrating in Indian indenture ships to Trinidad. He has described his fondness for Indian cuisine and Bollywood cinema.

Ganga has attained a Bsc in Law and Management and an MBA from Heriot Watt University. Ganga was awarded, in 2007, a Humming Bird Gold Medal for his contribution to cricket by the T&T Government. In August 2010 Ganga was bestowed with the Alexander B Chapman award for an outstanding contribution to Sport and Olympism by the Trinidad and Tobago Olympic Committee.
