= Ian Bradshaw =

West Indian cricketer

Personal information
- Full name: Ian David Russell Bradshaw
- Born: 9 July 1974 (age 52); Hopewell, Christ Church, Barbados
- Nickname: Carrie
- Batting: Left-handed
- Bowling: Left-arm medium-fast
- Role: Bowling all-rounder

International information
- National side: West Indies (2004–2007)
- Test debut (cap 265): 9 March 2006 v New Zealand
- Last Test: 10 June 2006 v India
- ODI debut (cap 122): 1 May 2004 v England
- Last ODI: 10 April 2007 v South Africa
- Only T20I (cap 1): 16 February 2006 v New Zealand

Career statistics
Competition	Test	ODI	T20I	FC
Matches	5	62	1	45
Runs scored	96	287	0	1213
Batting average	13.71	12.47	–	21.66
100s/50s	0/0	0/0	0/0	1/5
Top score	33	37	0*	109*
Balls bowled	1,021	3,172	24	8,272
Wickets	9	78	0	157
Bowling average	60.00	29.47	–	25.56
5 wickets in innings	0	0	0	2
10 wickets in match	0	0	0	0
Best bowling	3/73	3/15	–	6/34
Catches/stumpings	3/–	6/–	1/–	25/–
Medal record
Men's Cricket
Representing West Indies
ICC Champions Trophy
Winner	2004 England
Runner-up	2006 India
- Source: ESPNcricinfo, 2 March 2023

Ian David Russell Bradshaw (born 9 July 1974) is a former Barbadian cricketer who played for the West Indies cricket team as a left-arm fast bowler. A former West Indies under-19s and Barbados captain, he was a notable member of the West Indies team that won the 2004 Champions Trophy, being named man of the match in the tournament's final, and scored the winning boundary. Bradshaw eventually picked up 78 wickets for the Windies at an average of 29.47 from 62 ODIs.

== Youth career ==
Bradshaw captained West Indies under-19s during their 1993 tour of England, playing three youth Tests and two youth ODIs.

== Domestic career ==
He played only six first class games for Barbados before he was named the team's new captain in December 2000. Bradshaw skippered the team for six games on their way to win the 2000–01 Busta Cup, Barbados' 17th first class title. He later picked up six wickets in the 2004 Carib Beer Cup Challenge final, which Barbados won against Jamaica.

== International career ==
=== Debut years ===
In January 2004, Bradshaw was named in West Indies' 15-man ODI squad for the upcoming one day series against South Africa. This came as Bradshaw took five wickets for 22 runs to be named Man of the Match in the 2004 Red Stripe Bowl semi-final.

=== In and Out from the squad ===
Bradshaw was kept in the team for the 2004 7 match ODI series, against England. He wasn't selected for the series' first four games, then took two wickets as the Windies won the fifth match by five wickets at Saint Lucia's Beausejour Stadium. This was Bradshaw's first game for the West Indies in the Caribbean He ended up being tied with Andrew Flintoff, with five wickets, as the second highest wicket taker in the series.

Bradshaw was retained for the three-match series with Bangladesh. He won the Man of the Match award in the first ODI with figures of 2 for 11 off 10 overs and scoring 12 not out at the end as the Windies won by one wicket. He eventually claimed four wickets at an average of 9.60 for the series, ending up as the' third highest wicket taker behind Tino Best and Tapash Baisya.

West Indies played 11 ODIs in England in 2004, and Bradshaw played in every single one save for a rained off match at Southampton against New Zealand. The first seven matches were during the NatWest Series, where West Indies finished second after losing the final by 107 runs. Bradshaw opened with no wickets in a no result against New Zealand, then removed both England openers with his first seven balls at Trent Bridge in a seven-wicket win, before failing to take a wicket through the 32 overs in the remaining four matches. Bradshaw's bowling average of 85.50 was the highest by any West Indian in the series, but his economy rate of 3.71 was the best by a West Indian, and only beaten by Chris Cairns among bowlers with more than 10 overs in the tournament.

=== Golden Champions Trophy ===
Bradshaw was retained for the 2004 Champions Trophy, taking three wickets in the opening group, which West Indies won by beating Bangladesh and South Africa. He also removed Salman Butt for a two-ball duck in the seven-wicket semi-final win over Pakistan.

However, it was in the final that he, along with wicket-keeper Courtney Browne, made headlines West Indies had bowled England out for 217, with Bradshaw taking the wickets of Vikram Solanki and Michael Vaughan, but conceding the most runs of all West Indian bowlers with 54. With more than 15 overs left, Bradshaw joined Courtney Browne at the crease, with West Indies at 147 for eight and needing nearly half that score, 71, from the two last partnerships to win the game and the Champions Trophy. Bradshaw and Browne saw off the England fast bowlers of Steve Harmison, Andrew Flintoff, and Darren Gough in "dubious light", knocking off the required runs with seven balls to spare, thus giving West Indies their first major one-day title since the 1979 World Cup. Bradshaw's 34 not out along with his two wickets, made him Man of the Match, despite partner Browne making one more run and Wavell Hinds taking one more wicket with three for 24.

=== Permanent member ===
After playing for Barbados in the 2004–05 Regional One-Day Competition, Bradshaw was selected for the VB Series in Australia. Though Bradshaw was the leading wicket-taker for West Indies, with nine wickets in six games, including three wickets in the final group stage game against Pakistan when a win would have seen the West Indies through to the final stages. However, though Bradshaw took three for 47 from his ten overs, Pakistan totalled 307 for eight, and Bradshaw was called in to bat with 51 required off 37 balls. His innings was not a repeat of the Champions Trophy effort, however, as he was bowled by Naved-ul-Hasan for a four-ball duck; West Indies lost by 30 runs as they were bowled out with eleven balls to spare. During the series, Bradshaw injured his heel and was out of cricket for a fortnight, missing Carib Beer Series matches in domestic cricket.

Bradshaw continued to be an ODI specialist, playing all eight home ODIs (five against South Africa and three against Pakistan) during May 2005, and being on the losing team in all eight. His best performance in terms of bowling figures came in the rain-shortened second ODI at Sabina Park, where Bradshaw removed Graeme Smith and Jacques Kallis in his first three overs, and ended up with conceding 16 runs in six overs. However, no other West Indies bowler took wickets, leading to an eight-wicket defeat.

Bradshaw was then selected for the 13-man Test squad to face Pakistan, and was "expected to make his Test debut", but suffered a viral infection and missed the first Test before being selected in the squad for the second match. However, despite West Indies going in with four seam bowlers, they left Bradshaw out of the team.

A contract squabble between the West Indies Players' Association and the West Indies Cricket Board meant that several players, including Bradshaw, refused to sign contracts for the 2005 tour of Sri Lanka, and Bradshaw did thus not feature in the Indian Oil Cup ODI tournament during this tour.

He thus got a break from international cricket until February 2006, as West Indies' November 2005 tour of Australia only included Tests. Bradshaw played all matches on the February and March tour of New Zealand, however: one Twenty20 International, where he bowled the final over with New Zealand requiring 17 to win, conceding 16 to set up a bowl-out, five ODIs, and three Tests. Once again, Bradshaw was West Indies' leading wicket-taker in the ODI series, this time shared with Dwayne Smith, but with a better economy rate than Smith. His rate of 5.27, however, was bettered by six New Zealand bowlers as New Zealand won the series 4–1.

=== Test call-up ===
Bradshaw then made his Test debut at Eden Park, taking six wickets for 156 runs in the match, the second best bowling figures behind Chris Gayle, but New Zealand still prevailed by 27 runs after West Indies lost their way from 148 for nought to 263 all out, Bradshaw making 10 in an hour-long innings that was ended by him giving a catch to Stephen Fleming off Daniel Vettori. In the following two matches, Bradshaw took one wicket, though West Indies did not bowl in the final match, which was affected by rain. The returns were, however, good enough for the West Indies selectors to retain him for the home Test series against India, though in the meantime Bradshaw had taken nine wickets in the first four ODIs against India, helping West Indies to a 4–1 win. Bradshaw was not in the XI for the final game, but still held a catch as substitute fielder. Bradshaw then featured in the first two Tests against India, recording two wickets for 271 in two drawn games. Brian Lara, however, said Bradshaw "[had] been good" during the series in the aftermath of the third Test at St Kitts, where Bradshaw had been left out in favour of an extra batsman.

=== Late career ===
Bradshaw was selected in the West Indies squad for the 2007 Cricket World Cup. However, he only played in 3 matches with the West Indies generally preferring to use Daren Powell, Jerome Taylor and Corey Collymore as their pace bowling attack.

After the West Indies' elimination from the tournament, Bradshaw retired from international cricket.
