= Runako Morton =

Nevisian cricketer

Personal information
- Full name: Runako Shakur Morton
- Born: 22 July 1978; Gingerland, Nevis, Saint Kitts and Nevis
- Died: 4 March 2012 (aged 33); Chaguanas, Trinidad and Tobago
- Batting: Right-handed
- Bowling: Right arm off break
- Role: Batsman

International information
- National side: West Indies (2002–2010)
- Test debut (cap 262): 13 July 2005 v Sri Lanka
- Last Test: 30 May 2008 v Australia
- ODI debut (cap 110): 15 February 2002 v Pakistan
- Last ODI: 9 February 2010 v Australia
- ODI shirt no.: 37
- T20I debut (cap 8): 16 February 2006 v New Zealand
- Last T20I: 23 February 2010 v Australia

Domestic team information
- Years: Team
- 1996–2010: Leeward Islands
- 2010–2012: Trinidad and Tobago

Career statistics
Competition	Test	ODI	T20I	FC
Matches	15	56	7	95
Runs scored	573	1,519	96	5,980
Batting average	22.03	33.75	16.00	39.60
100s/50s	0/4	2/10	0/0	14/37
Top score	70*	110*	40	231
Balls bowled	66	6	–	473
Wickets	0	0	–	8
Bowling average	–	–	–	36.25
5 wickets in innings	–	–	–	0
10 wickets in match	–	–	–	0
Best bowling	–	–	–	3/17
Catches/stumpings	20/–	20/–	2/–	105/–
Medal record
Men's Cricket
Representing West Indies
ICC Champions Trophy
Runner-up	2006 India
- Source: CricketArchive, 4 November 2017

Runako Shakur Morton (22 July 1978 – 4 March 2012) was a Nevisian cricketer who played for West Indies in all formats of the game. He was a right-handed batsman and a right-handed offbreak bowler.

== Domestic career ==
A lively, often unpredictable character, Morton was expelled from the West Indian cricketing academy in July 2001 for bad behaviour but continued to play for the Leeward Islands in the Busta Cup.

== International career ==
Upon his return in February 2002, he was called into the West Indies squad as a replacement for Marlon Samuels, but he was dropped once again when he lied about his non-appearance in the ICC Champions Trophy in September 2002.

Following a stabbing incident in January 2004, he was arrested but was given a third chance in May 2005 when he was recalled for the South African Test.

He was involved in a bizarre run-out with Shivnarine Chanderpaul in the third Test against New Zealand in 2006. Morton drove the ball to mid-on where Daniel Vettori was fielding and ran to the non-striker end. Chanderpaul, at the other end, initially took a few steps down the wicket but then turned and went back to the non-striker's end. Morton believed he was out, and, furious at his captain, began to walk off. However, following a call to the third umpire, it was decided that Morton had grounded his bat at the non-striker's end just before Chanderpaul, and hence was safe and that Chanderpaul was out. Video evidence suggests that the umpire's decision was wrong: although Morton made his ground first, he then left it before the run-out was made, so he should have been the one dismissed.

As a batsman, Morton had a reputation for hitting the ball very hard, but had problems picking up singles in between boundaries. He has the dubious record of the slowest ODI duck which lasted 31 balls in the final of the DLF Cup against Australia.

Morton died on 4 March 2012, when he lost control of the car he was driving along the Sir Solomon Hochoy Highway, hitting a utility pole at Chase Village in Chaguanas, Trinidad and Tobago.
