= Jerome Taylor =

Jamaican cricketer (born 1984)

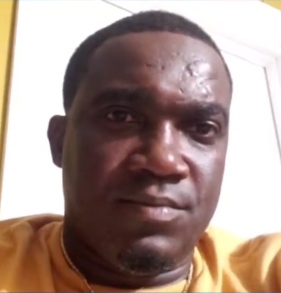
- Jerome Taylor in 2024

Personal information
- Full name: Jerome Everton Taylor
- Born: 22 June 1984 (age 42); St. Elizabeth, Jamaica
- Height: 6 ft 1 in (1.85 m)
- Batting: Right-handed
- Bowling: Right arm fast
- Role: Bowler

International information
- National side: West Indies (2003–2018)
- Test debut (cap 252): 20 June 2003 v Sri Lanka
- Last Test: 3 January 2016 v Australia
- ODI debut (cap 117): 11 June 2003 v Sri Lanka
- Last ODI: 29 September 2017 v England
- T20I debut (cap 11): 16 February 2006 v New Zealand
- Last T20I: 3 January 2018 v New Zealand

Domestic team information
- Years: Team
- 2002/03–2018/19: Jamaica
- 2007: Leicestershire
- 2011: Pune Warriors India
- 2014–2019: Jamaica Tallawahs
- 2016: St Lucia Zouks
- 2017: Sussex
- 2017: St Lucia Stars
- 2018-2019: Somerset
- 2018/19: Hobart Hurricanes
- 2016: Mumbai Indians

Career statistics
Competition	Test	ODI	T20I	FC
Matches	46	90	30	103
Runs scored	856	278	118	1,595
Batting average	12.96	8.42	13.11	11.72
100s/50s	1/1	0/0	0/0	1/1
Top score	106	43*	21	106
Balls bowled	7,757	4,341	600	15,824
Wickets	130	128	33	326
Bowling average	34.46	29.53	26.15	25.76
5 wickets in innings	4	1	0	16
10 wickets in match	0	0	0	2
Best bowling	6/47	5/48	3/6	8/59
Catches/stumpings	8/–	20/–	9/–	25/–
- Source: Cricinfo, 3 March 2023

Jerome Everton Taylor (born 22 June 1984) is a Jamaican former cricketer who played as a fast bowler for the West Indies. Taylor took over 100 wickets for the Windies in both Tests and One Day Internationals (ODI). During 2017 he reversed an initial decision to retire from international cricket. Taylor has also featured for Jamaica, English sides Somerset, Leicestershire and Sussex, CPL teams St Lucia Zouks and Jamaica Tallawahs and IPL side Pune Warriors in his cricketing career. Taylor was a member of the West Indies team that won the 2016 T20 World Cup. He is the only bowler to have ever taken a hat-trick in a Champions Trophy match, which he did in the 2006 tournament against Australia, and that was the first hat-trick taken by a West Indian bowler in the ODI format.

== International career ==
=== Early playing days ===
As a youngster, Taylor was introduced to cricket by his father who also was a cricketer in his own right. Though he took up carpentry and track and field in his teenage years, he remained fond of cricket for the most part. As he grew up wanting to become a fast bowler, admiring legends such as Wasim Akram, Curtly Ambrose, Courtney Walsh and Glenn McGrath. Taylor made his ODI debut on 11 June 2003, claiming 2 for 39 in the 3rd one day international against Sri Lanka at the Arnos Vale Ground, St Vincent and the Grenadines. During his debut season for Jamaica, he was named the most promising fast bowler of the 2003 Carib Beer Cup, picking up 21 wickets at an average of 20.14. Soon after he was selected onto the West Indies's 14 man squad for the first test against Sri Lanka. Taylor made his debut in the first test played at the Beausejour Stadium in St Lucia. He eventually dismissed Marvan Atapattu to pick up his first test wicket, in the 2nd and final test of the series played at Sabina Park, Jamaica.

=== Later career ===
On 30 June 2006, Taylor picked up his first five wicket haul on day one of the fourth test of India's 2006 tour of the Caribbean. He then established himself as a regular in the ODI side as the Windies' leading wicket-taker during the DLF Cup in Malaysia with eight dismissals. He was also selected for the 2006 Champions Trophy and claimed four wickets in the preliminary games against Zimbabwe and Bangladesh. He later took a hat-trick in West Indies' opening group game of the 2006 ICC Champions Trophy against Australia, becoming the first West Indian to achieve such a feat in a one-day international. Earlier, Taylor had bowled Ricky Ponting for just 1. With 21 runs required and 14 balls remaining, Taylor had Michael Hussey bowled for 13, then dismissed Brett Lee lbw on the very next but last ball of that over. Returning to deliver the final over, he bowled Brad Hogg to complete the hat-trick. He finished with four for 49, which was his second-best ODI figures. Taylor picked up a total of 13 wickets to be the leading wicket taker in that edition of the tournament. He also shares the record, with Pakistan's Hasan Ali for being the highest wicket taker in any edition of the ICC Champions Trophy. On 20 November 2006, Taylor claimed 5 for 37 in the first innings of the second test against Pakistan at the Multan Cricket Stadium, Multan. Taylor went on to win the Emerging Player of the Year award at the 2007 WIPA Awards.

On 7 December 2007 Taylor claimed a matchwinning haul of 5 for 48 in the 4th ODI against Zimbabwe at the Queens Sports Club, Bulawayo. He was also named the man of the match for his feats with the ball in that encounter. On 16 December 2007 he took a triple wicket maiden in the 1st T20I against South Africa at the Sahara Oval. He also won Jamaica Cricketer of the Year, on 3 December 2008, at the Jamaica Cricket Association's annual function held at the Courtleigh Auditorium in New Kingston. On 13 December 2008 Taylor scored 106, his maiden first-class hundred, in the 1st Test against New Zealand at the University of Otago Oval. With 17 fours and eight sixes, his 107 ball century came batting at number 8 in a 153 run partnership with Shivnarine Chanderpaul. He holds the record of the lowest Test batting average among players to have scored a century. On 8 February 2009 he picked up 5 for 11 in the second innings of the first test at Sabina Park, to help the Windies to resounding victory over England. Taylor went on to win an Cricinfo award for the best bowling performance in Test Cricket for 2009.

In September 2014 Taylor scored 40 and later picked up his 100th test wicket, dismissing Robiul Islam for a duck, with eventual second innings figures of 3 for 39 in the Windies' 296 run second test win over Bangladesh. This triumph at Saint Lucia's Beausejour Cricket Ground, capped off a 2-0 whitewash in the test series. On 11 October 2014 he claimed his 100th wicket in one day internationals, bowling Shikhar Dhawan for a duck. This came in the 2nd ODI of the Windies 2014 tour of India played at the Feroz Shah Kotla Ground.

He later took career best figures of 6 for 47 in the first innings of the second and final test of Australia's 2015 tour of the Caribbean. On 23 September 2016, Taylor along with Dwayne Bravo, put together a 66 run partnership during the 1st T20I against Pakistan, played at the Dubai International Stadium in Dubai, United Arab Emirates. In so doing they both set the record for the highest ever 9th wicket partnership in T20I history.

== Domestic career ==
Taylor joined English county cricket side Leicestershire in the summer of 2007. During the 2009 IPL auction he was picked up by the Kings XI Punjab for that season's tournament. However, due to injuries sustained from a vehicular accident he was unable to feature and was thus replaced by South African left arm seamer Yusuf Abdulla. In July 2016 Taylor joined Caribbean Premier League side St Lucia Zouks. On 3 April 2016 Taylor joined IPL outfit Mumbai Indians, as a replacement for injured Sri Lankan pacer Lasith Malinga, for the remainder of the 2016 IPL season. On 24 April 2017 he signed up with Sussex to play in the Royal London One Day Cup. He later took a hattrick in an eventual defeat to Essex in the One Day Cup. He then moved to Somerset in July 2018 to feature in the county's Vitality Blast campaign. He later took 5 for 15 in a 16 run win over Hampshire at Taunton. Taylor became only the third Hampshire bowler to claim a five wicket haul in T20 cricket. He eventually played 44 matches picking up 22 wickets at an average of 16.64 during his debut season at the club. In February 2020 Taylor signed a three-year deal with Gloucestershire as a Kolpak player.
