= 2006 ICC Champions Trophy =

Cricket tournament

- Dates: 7 October – 5 November 2006
- Administrator: International Cricket Council
- Cricket format: One Day International
- Tournament format(s): Round-robin and knockout
- Host: India
- Champions: Australia (1st title)
- Runners-up: West Indies
- Participants: 10
- Matches: 21
- Player of the series: (Cricket West Indies) Chris Gayle
- Most runs: (Cricket West Indies) Chris Gayle (474)
- Most wickets: (Cricket West Indies) Jerome Taylor (13)

The 2006 ICC Champions Trophy was a One Day International cricket tournament held in India from 7 October to 5 November 2006. It was the fifth edition of the ICC Champions Trophy (previously known as the ICC Knock-out). The tournament venue was not confirmed until mid-2005 when the Indian government agreed that tournament revenues would be free from tax (the 2002 tournament had been due to be held in India, but was switched to Sri Lanka when an exemption from tax in India was not granted). Australia won the tournament, their first Champions Trophy victory. They were the only team to get one loss in the tournament, as all other teams lost at least two matches. West Indies, their final opponents, beat Australia in the group stage but were bowled out for 138 in the final and lost by eight wickets on the Duckworth–Lewis method. West Indies opening batsman Chris Gayle was named Player of the Tournament.

English writer Tim de Lisle said the tournament "had been fun" because "it had been unpredictable." The unpredictability was in part shown by the fact that no Asian team qualified for the semi-final, for the first time in a major ICC tournament since the 1975 World Cup. De Lisle also claimed that "the pitches" had been the "tournament's secret," saying that they were "sporting and quixotic" and "quite untypical of both one-day cricket and the subcontinent." His views were echoed by panelists in a roundtable discussion organized by ESPNcricinfo, "who hoped that the tournament would not be a one-off in a batsman-dominated game," according to news site rediff.com. The tournament recorded five of the 10 lowest team totals in the tournament's history, and totals of 80 (for West Indies v Sri Lanka) and 89 (for Pakistan v South Africa) were the lowest recorded in matches involving the top eight ranked One-day International teams of the world.

== Qualification ==
The Ten full member teams competed in the tournament and were seeded according to the ICC ODI Championship standings on 1 April 2006.Bangladesh became the last team to qualify, claiming tenth place ahead of Kenya on 23 March 2006. The first six teams on the ICC ODI table (Australia, South Africa, Pakistan, New Zealand, India, and England) qualified automatically; the next four teams (Sri Lanka, the defending champions West Indies, Zimbabwe and Bangladesh) played a pre-tournament round-robin qualifying round from 7 to 14 October to determine which two teams will proceed to play in the main round.

Qualification	Date	Berths	Country
Host	26 May 2005	1	India
ODI Championship	1 April 2006	5	Australia
ODI Championship	1 April 2006	5	South Africa
ODI Championship	1 April 2006	5	Pakistan
ODI Championship	1 April 2006	5	New Zealand
ODI Championship	1 April 2006	5	England
ODI Championship	1 April 2006	4	Sri Lanka
ODI Championship	1 April 2006	4	West Indies
ODI Championship	1 April 2006	4	Zimbabwe
ODI Championship	1 April 2006	4	Bangladesh

== Tournament structure ==
Two teams from the qualifying round, plus the other six teams, played in a group stage, split into two groups of four in a round-robin competition, played from 15 to 29 October.

The top two teams from each group qualified for the semi-finals played on 1 November and 2 November. The final was played on 5 November.

== Venues ==
Matches in the preliminary round and the group round were played in the Punjab Cricket Association Stadium in Mohali, Sardar Patel Stadium in Ahmedabad, the Sawai Mansingh Stadium in Jaipur, and the Brabourne Stadium in Mumbai. The matches in Mumbai were the first One Day Internationals at Brabourne Stadium for 11 years.

The semi-finals were played in Mohali and Jaipur. The final was played in Mumbai.

Mumbai	Jaipur	Mohali	Ahmedabad
Brabourne Stadium	Sawai Mansingh Stadium	PCA Stadium	Sardar Patel Stadium
Capacity: 20,000	Capacity: 24,000	Capacity: 26,950	Capacity: 49,000

== Match officials ==
Three match referees and eight umpires were named for the tournament. Of the ten umpires on the ICC elite panel, neither Darrell Hair, who was not nominated due to security concerns, nor Billy Doctrove was employed for the tournament. Those were two umpires calling Pakistan for ball tampering in August. An ICC spokesman said, "this didn't mean Billy Doctrove is a bad umpire," and that there was "nothing sinister" about the decision.

The eight umpires for the tournament were:

- (England) Mark Benson
- (New Zealand) Billy Bowden
- (Cricket West Indies) Steve Bucknor
- (Pakistan) Aleem Dar
- (Australia) Daryl Harper
- (South Africa) Rudi Koertzen
- (Pakistan) Asad Rauf
- (Australia) Simon Taufel

The three match referees for the tournament were:

- (New Zealand) Jeff Crowe
- (Sri Lanka) Ranjan Madugalle
- (South Africa) Mike Procter

== Qualifying round ==
West Indies and Sri Lanka had qualified with a game to spare, and their match only determined their position on the ICC ODI Championship table as well as group opposition in the main stage.

Pos	Team	Pld	W	L	T	NR	Pts	NRR
1	Sri Lanka	3	3	0	0	0	6	2.672
2	West Indies	3	2	1	0	0	4	0.404
3	Bangladesh	3	1	2	0	0	2	0.019
4	Zimbabwe	3	0	3	0	0	0	−2.927

Source: EspnCricinfo

7 October 2006
14:30 (D/N)
Scorecard

Sri Lanka; 302/8 (50 overs)	v	Bangladesh; 265/9 (50 overs)
Upul Tharanga 105 (129); Abdur Razzak 2/49 (10 overs)		Shakib Al Hasan 67* (107); Farveez Maharoof 3/47 (7 overs)

Sri Lanka won by 37 runs
PCA Stadium, Mohali
Umpires: Daryl Harper (Aus) and Steve Bucknor (WI)
Player of the match: Upul Tharanga (SL)

- Bangladesh won the toss and elected to field.
- Points: Sri Lanka 2, Bangladesh 0

8 October 2006
14:30 (D/N)
Scorecard

Zimbabwe; 85 (30.1 overs)	v	West Indies; 90/1 (14.2 overs)
Prosper Utseya 27* (41); Chris Gayle 3/3 (3.1 overs)		Chris Gayle 41 (34); Elton Chigumbura 1/17 (3 overs)

West Indies won by 9 wickets
Sardar Patel Stadium, Ahmedabad
Umpires: Mark Benson (Eng) and Rudi Koertzen (RSA)
Player of the match: Chris Gayle (WI)

- Zimbabwe won the toss and elected to bat.
- Points: West Indies 2, Zimbabwe 0

10 October 2006
14:30 (D/N)
Scorecard

Sri Lanka; 285/7 (50 overs)	v	Zimbabwe; 141 (42.3 overs)
Upul Tharanga 110 (130); Tafadzwa Kamungozi 2/55 (10 overs)		Brendan Taylor 30 (40); Lasith Malinga 3/25 (9.3 overs)

Sri Lanka won by 144 runs
Sardar Patel Stadium, Ahmedabad
Umpires: Aleem Dar (Pak) and Asad Rauf (Pak)
Player of the match: Upul Tharanga (SL)

- Sri Lanka won the toss and elected to bat.
- Points: Sri Lanka 2, Zimbabwe 0
- As a result of this match, Sri Lanka qualified for the group stage and Zimbabwe were eliminated.

11 October 2006
14:30 (D/N)
Scorecard

Bangladesh; 161 (46.3 overs)	v	West Indies; 164/0 (36.4 overs)
Aftab Ahmed 59 (55); Dwayne Bravo 3/14 (10 overs)		Chris Gayle 104* (118)

West Indies won by 10 wickets
Sawai Mansingh Stadium, Jaipur
Umpires: Billy Bowden (NZ) and Simon Taufel (Aus)
Player of the match: Chris Gayle (WI)

- Bangladesh won the toss and elected to bat.
- Points: West Indies 2, Bangladesh 0
- As a result of this match, West Indies qualified for the group stage and Bangladesh were eliminated.

13th October 2006
14:30 (D/N)
Scorecard

Bangladesh; 231/6 (50 overs)	v	Zimbabwe; 130 (44.4 overs)
Shahriar Nafees 123* (161); Ed Rainsford 2/41 (10 overs)		Brendan Taylor 52 (74); Shakib Al Hasan 3/18 (10 overs)

Bangladesh won by 101 runs
Sawai Mansingh Stadium, Jaipur
Umpires: Daryl Harper (Aus) and Steve Bucknor (WI)
Player of the match: Shahriar Nafees (Ban)

- Zimbabwe won the toss and elected to field.
- Points: Bangladesh 2, Zimbabwe 0

14 October 2006
14:30 (D/N)
Scorecard

West Indies; 80 (30.4 overs)	v	Sri Lanka; 83/1 (13.2 overs)
Wavell Hinds 28 (86); Farveez Maharoof 6/14 (9 overs)		Sanath Jayasuriya 45 (47); Fidel Edwards 1/17 (4 overs)

Sri Lanka won by 9 wickets
Brabourne Stadium, Mumbai
Umpires: Asad Rauf (Pak) and Rudi Koertzen (RSA)
Player of the match: Farveez Maharoof (SL)

- West Indies won the toss and elected to bat
- Points: Sri Lanka 2, West Indies 0
- As a result of this match, West Indies qualified for Group A and Sri Lanka qualified for Group B

== Group stage ==
=== Group A ===
Pos	Team	Pld	W	L	T	NR	Pts	NRR
1	Australia	3	2	1	0	0	4	0.529
2	West Indies	3	2	1	0	0	4	0.009
3	India	3	1	2	0	0	2	0.482
4	England	3	1	2	0	0	2	−1.044

Source: EspnCricinfo

15 October 2006
14:30 (D/N)
Scorecard

England; 125 (37 overs)	v	India; 126/6 (29.3 overs)
Paul Collingwood 38 (54); Munaf Patel 3/18 (8 overs)		Sachin Tendulkar 35 (41); Jamie Dalrymple 2/5 (4 overs)

India won by 4 wickets
Sawai Mansingh Stadium, Jaipur
Umpires: Daryl Harper (Aus) and Simon Taufel (Aus)
Player of the match: Munaf Patel (Ind)

- India won the toss and elected to field.
- Points: India 2, England 0

18 October 2006
14:30 (D/N)
Scorecard

West Indies; 234/6 (50 overs)	v	Australia; 224/9 (50 overs)
Runako Morton 90* (103); Nathan Bracken 2/42 (10 overs)		Adam Gilchrist 92 (120); Jerome Taylor 4/49 (10 overs)

West Indies won by 10 runs
Brabourne Stadium, Mumbai
Umpires: Mark Benson (Eng) and Rudi Koertzen (RSA)
Player of the match: Runako Morton (WI)

- West Indies won the toss and elected to bat.
- Points: West Indies 2, Australia 0

21 October 2006
14:30 (D/N)
Scorecard

England; 169 (45 overs)	v	Australia; 170/4 (36.5 overs)
Andrew Strauss 56 (90); Shane Watson 3/16 (7 overs)		Damien Martyn 78 (91); Sajid Mahmood 2/57 (10 overs)

Australia won by 6 wickets
Sardar Patel Stadium, Ahmedabad
Umpires: Aleem Dar (Pak) and Asad Rauf (Pak)
Player of the match: Damien Martyn (Aus)

- Australia won the toss and elected to field.
- Points: Australia 2, England 0

26 October 2006
14:30 (D/N)
Scorecard

India; 223/9 (50 overs)	v	West Indies; 224/7 (49.4 overs)
MS Dhoni 51 (65); Ian Bradshaw 3/30 (10 overs)		Shivnarine Chanderpaul 51 (72); Ajit Agarkar 2/52 (9.4 overs)

West Indies won by 3 wickets
Sardar Patel Stadium, Ahmedabad
Umpires: Aleem Dar (Pak) and Daryl Harper (Aus)
Player of the match: Shivnarine Chanderpaul (WI)

- West Indies won the toss and elected to field.
- Points: West Indies 2, India 0
- As a result of this match, West Indies qualified for the semifinals and England were eliminated..

28 October 2006
14:30 (D/N)
Scorecard

West Indies; 272/4 (50 overs)	v	England; 276/7 (48.3 overs)
Dwayne Bravo 112* (124); Sajid Mahmood 2/44 (7 overs)		Kevin Pietersen 90* (86); Chris Gayle 3/31 (10 overs)

England won by 3 wickets
Sardar Patel Stadium, Ahmedabad
Umpires: Daryl Harper (Aus) and Simon Taufel (Aus)
Player of the match: Chris Gayle (WI)

- West Indies won the toss and elected to bat.
- Points: England 2, West Indies 0

29 October 2006
14:30 (D/N)
Scorecard

India; 249/8 (50 overs)	v	Australia; 252/4 (45.4 overs)
Virender Sehwag 65 (90); Glenn McGrath 2/34 (10 overs)		Damien Martyn 73* (104); S. Sreesanth 2/43 (8 overs)

Australia won by 6 wickets
PCA Stadium, Mohali
Umpires: Billy Bowden (NZ) and Steve Bucknor (WI)
Player of the match: Damien Martyn (Aus)

- India won the toss and elected to bat
- Points: Australia 2, India 0
- As a result of this match, Australia qualified for semifinals and India were eliminated

=== Group B ===
Pos	Team	Pld	W	L	T	NR	Pts	NRR
1	South Africa	3	2	1	0	0	4	0.767
2	New Zealand	3	2	1	0	0	4	0.572
3	Sri Lanka	3	1	2	0	0	2	−0.195
4	Pakistan	3	1	2	0	0	2	−1.107

Source: EspnCricinfo

16 October 2006
14:30 (D/N)
Scorecard

New Zealand; 195 (45.4 overs)	v	South Africa; 108 (34.1 overs)
Stephen Fleming 89 (112); Jacques Kallis 3/28 (7 overs)		Graeme Smith 42 (57); Kyle Mills 3/18 (6 overs)

New Zealand won by 87 runs
Brabourne Stadium, Mumbai
Umpires: Aleem Dar (Pak) and Mark Benson (Eng)
Player of the match: Stephen Fleming (NZ)

- South Africa won the toss and elected to field.
- Points: New Zealand 2, South Africa 0

17 October 2006
14:30 (D/N)
Scorecard

Sri Lanka; 253 (49.2 overs)	v	Pakistan; 255/6 (48.1 overs)
Sanath Jayasuriya 48 (35); Abdul Razzaq 4/50 (7.2 overs)		Imran Farhat 53 (64); Chaminda Vaas 2/61 (10 overs)

Pakistan won by 4 wickets
Sawai Mansingh Stadium, Jaipur
Umpires: Billy Bowden (NZ) and Simon Taufel (Aus)
Player of the match: Abdul Razzaq (Pak)

- Sri Lanka won the toss and elected to bat.
- Points: Pakistan 2, Sri Lanka 0

20 October 2006
14:30 (D/N)
Scorecard

New Zealand; 165 (49.2 overs)	v	Sri Lanka; 166/3 (36 overs)
Daniel Vettori 46* (53); Muttiah Muralitharan 4/23 (10 overs)		Upul Tharanga 56 (77); Jeetan Patel 2/32 (9 overs)

Sri Lanka won by 7 wickets
Brabourne Stadium, Mumbai
Umpires: Aleem Dar (Pak) and Rudi Koertzen (RSA)
Player of the match: Muttiah Muralitharan (SL)

- New Zealand won the toss and elected to bat.
- Points: Sri Lanka 2, New Zealand 0

24 October 2006
14:30 (D/N)
Scorecard

South Africa; 219/9 (50 overs)	v	Sri Lanka; 141 (39.1 overs)
AB de Villiers 54 (88); Lasith Malinga 4/53 (9 overs)		Mahela Jayawardene 36 (50); Andre Nel 3/41 (9 overs)

South Africa won by 78 runs
Sawai Mansingh Stadium, Jaipur
Umpires: Billy Bowden (NZ) and Simon Taufel (Aus)
Player of the match: Shaun Pollock (RSA)

- South Africa won the toss and elected to bat.
- Points: South Africa 2, Sri Lanka 0

25 October 2006
14:30 (D/N)
Scorecard

New Zealand; 274/7 (50 overs)	v	Pakistan; 223 (46.3 overs)
Scott Styris 86 (113); Umar Gul 2/47 (9 overs)		Mohammad Yousuf 71 (92); Shane Bond 3/45 (10 overs)

New Zealand won by 51 runs
PCA Stadium, Mohali
Umpires: Mark Benson (Eng) and Rudi Koertzen (RSA)
Player of the match: Stephen Fleming (NZ)

- Pakistan won the toss and elected to field.
- Points: New Zealand 2, Pakistan 0
- As a result of this match, New Zealand qualified for semi-finals and Sri Lanka were eliminated.

27 October 2006
14:30 (D/N)
Scorecard

South Africa; 213/8 (50 overs)	v	Pakistan; 89 (25 overs)
Mark Boucher 69 (98); Umar Gul 3/36 (8 overs)		Yasir Arafat 27 (37); Makhaya Ntini 5/21 (6 overs)

South Africa won by 124 runs
PCA Stadium, Mohali
Umpires: Billy Bowden (NZ) and Mark Benson (Eng)
Player of the match: Makhaya Ntini (RSA)

- South Africa won the toss and elected to bat
- Points: South Africa 2, Pakistan 0
- As a result of this match, South Africa qualified for semifinals and Pakistan were eliminated.

== Knock-out stage ==
Semifinals
A1	Australia	240/9 (50 overs)
B2	New Zealand	206 (46 overs)
B1	South Africa	258/8 (50 overs)
A2	West Indies	262/4 (44 overs)

Final
A1	Australia	116/2 (28.1 overs)
A2	West Indies	138 (30.4 overs)

=== Semi-finals ===
1 November 2006
14:30 (D/N)
Scorecard

Australia; 240/9 (50 overs)	v	New Zealand; 206 (46 overs)
Andrew Symonds 58 (58); Kyle Mills 4/38 (10 overs)		Daniel Vettori 79 (103); Glenn McGrath 3/22 (10 overs)

Australia won by 34 runs
PCA Stadium, Mohali
Umpires: Steve Bucknor (WI) and Rudi Koertzen (RSA)
Player of the match: Glenn McGrath (Aus)

- New Zealand won the toss and elected to field.

2 November 2006
14:30 (D/N)
Scorecard

South Africa; 258/8 (50 overs)	v	West Indies; 262/4 (46 overs)
Herschelle Gibbs 77 (90); Jerome Taylor 2/48 (10 overs)		Chris Gayle 133* (135); Graeme Smith 1/43 (10 overs)

West Indies won by 6 wickets
Sawai Mansingh Stadium, Jaipur
Umpires: Aleem Dar (Pak) and Simon Taufel (Aus)
Player of the match: Chris Gayle (WI)

- South Africa won the toss and elected to bat

=== Final ===
5 November 2006
14:30 (D/N)
Scorecard

West Indies; 138 (30.4 overs)	v	Australia; 116/2 (28.1 overs)
Chris Gayle 37 (27); Nathan Bracken 3/22 (6 overs)		Shane Watson 57* (88); Ian Bradshaw 1/21 (6 overs)

Australia won by 8 wickets (D/L method)
Brabourne Stadium, Mumbai
Umpires: Aleem Dar (Pak) and Rudi Koertzen (RSA)
Player of the match: Shane Watson (Aus)

- West Indies won the toss and elected to bat
- Australia were set a revised target of 116 runs from 35 overs.
- Rain interrupted play during the 10th over of Australian innings.
- Australia won the 2006 ICC Champions Trophy.
- Damien Martyn (Aus) played his last ODI match.

== Tournament statistics ==
Statistics include performances in preliminary round matches.

=== Batting ===
Most runs
Runs	Player	Team
474	Chris Gayle	West Indies
320	Upul Tharanga	Sri Lanka
241	Damien Martyn	Australia
222	Shivnarine Chanderpaul	West Indies
188	Mahela Jayawardene	Sri Lanka

- Source: CricInfo

Highest individual score
Player	Team	Runs	Opposition	Stadium	Date
Chris Gayle	West Indies	133*	South Africa	Sawai Mansingh Stadium	2 November
Shahriar Nafees	Bangladesh	123*	Zimbabwe	Sawai Mansingh Stadium	13 October
Dwayne Bravo	West Indies	112*	England	Sardar Patel Stadium	28 October
Upul Tharanga	Sri Lanka	110	Zimbabwe	Sardar Patel Stadium	10 October
Upul Tharanga	Sri Lanka	105	Bangladesh	Punjab Cricket Association Stadium	7 October

- Source: CricInfo

=== Bowling ===
Most wickets
Wickets	Player	Team
13	Jerome Taylor	West Indies
12	Farveez Maharoof	Sri Lanka
11	Lasith Malinga	Sri Lanka
10	Kyle Mills	New Zealand
10	Glenn McGrath	Australia
10	Nathan Bracken	Australia

- Source: CricInfo

Best bowling analysis
Player	Team	Analysis	Opposition	Stadium	Date
Farveez Maharoof	Sri Lanka	6/14	West Indies	Brabourne Stadium	14 October
Makhaya Ntini	South Africa	5/21	Pakistan	Punjab Cricket Association Stadium	27 October
Muttiah Muralitharan	Sri Lanka	4/23	New Zealand	Brabourne Stadium	20 October
Kyle Mills	New Zealand	4/38	Australia	Punjab Cricket Association Stadium	1 November
Jerome Taylor	West Indies	4/49	Australia	Brabourne Stadium	18 October

- Source: CricInfo

== Records ==
Records broken during the tournament:

- Most consecutive defeats, 9, Zimbabwe (carried over from previous tournaments).
- Most consecutive wins: 6, West Indies (carried over from previous tournaments).
- Number of centuries in a tournament: 3, Chris Gayle
- Most runs in a tournament: 474, Gayle
- Most consecutive ducks: 3, Habibul Bashar (carried over from previous tournaments)
- Youngest centurion in a Champions Trophy: Shahriar Nafees, 123 not out, Bangladesh v Zimbabwe, aged 20 years 261 days.
- Highest third wicket partnership: 165, Upul Tharanga and Kumar Sangakkara, Sri Lanka v Zimbabwe at Sardar Patel Stadium, 10 October.
- Highest fifth wicket partnership: 137, Brian Lara and Runako Morton, West Indies v Australia at Brabourne Stadium, 18 October.
- Highest sixth wicket partnership: 131, Mark Boucher and Justin Kemp, South Africa v Pakistan at Punjab Cricket Association Stadium, 27 October.
- Highest seventh wicket partnership: 103, Jacob Oram and Daniel Vettori, New Zealand v Australia at Punjab Cricket Association Stadium, 1 November.
- Best bowling analysis: 9–2–14–6, Farveez Maharoof, Sri Lanka v West Indies, Brabourne Stadium, 14 October.
- First hat-trick: Jerome Taylor v Australia, Brabourne Stadium, 18 October.

== Off the field issues ==
The BCCI, Indian cricket's governing body, made efforts to ensure that this is the last ICC Champions Trophy. They stated that it was a "financial burden" for host nations and that the ICC should host only one international tournament, the World Cup. However, in April, BCCI president Sharad Pawar said that he would "respect the decision" if the ICC unanimously agreed to keep the Champions Trophy on the calendar.

After the bombings in Mumbai in July 2006, there were concerns raised about the security of players, but no team decided to withdraw on these grounds.

Herschelle Gibbs returned to India for the first time in six years; he had refused to tour the country following the match-fixing scandal on the tour of India in 2000, over fears he might be arrested. He eventually agreed to a questioning session with the Delhi police, incriminating several more people in the scandal.

Pakistan's team composition frequently changed; the original captain Inzamam-ul-Haq was suspended following his decision to forfeit the fourth Test of Pakistan's match against England over an umpiring decision. Younis Khan was instated as captain, withdrew himself, then was appointed for the job again. On 16 October, the day before their first match, Pakistan fast bowlers Mohammad Asif and Shoaib Akhtar were sent home following a positive A sample of a drugs test.

=== Award ceremony controversy ===
During the Award ceremony after the finals, Ricky Ponting tapped the shoulders of BCCI President Sharad Pawar and informally gestured him to hand over the trophy. Soon after the trophy was handed over, Damien Martyn nudged Sharad Pawar off the stage, eager to relish the moment and to pose for the waiting photographers. Former Indian batsman Sunil Gavaskar who was also present on the stage, later disclosed that one of the Australian team members referred to Pawar as "Hiya Buddy."

Although Pawar tried to play down the incident by stating that "it wasn't intentional," some cricketers, including the usually diplomatic Sachin Tendulkar and Nikhil Chopra reacted strongly to this. In Mumbai, a section of NCP workers took to the streets demanding an apology from the Australian cricket team. Chaggan Bhujbal, a NCP leader, said, "This is an insult to a senior leader. We will make a formal complaint to the Australian embassy."

The BCCI, however, decided not to complain to Cricket Australia officially. However, the issue soon got resolved when Ricky Ponting tended his apology to Pawar.

== See also ==
- 2004 ICC Champions Trophy
- 2007 Cricket World Cup
