= Ramnaresh Sarwan =

West Indian cricketer

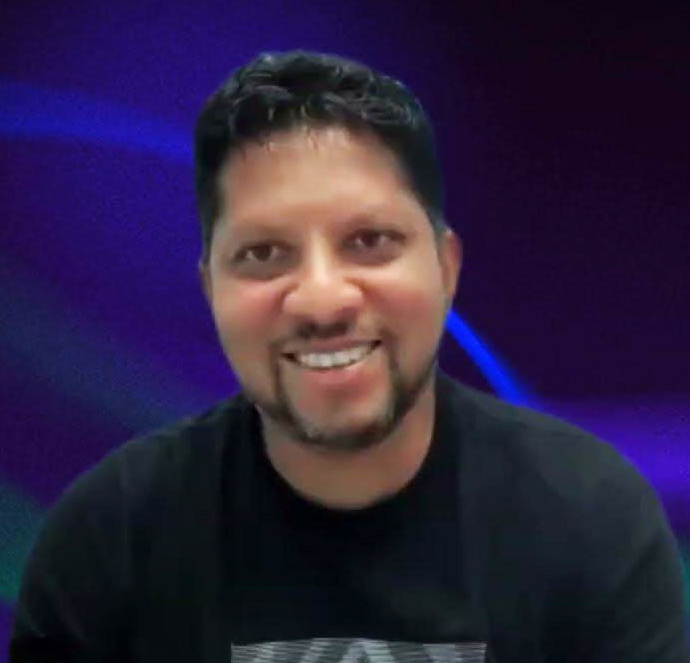
- Ramnaresh Sarwan in 2024

Personal information
- Full name: Ramnaresh Ronnie Sarwan
- Born: 23 June 1980 (age 46); Wakenaam Island, Guyana
- Nickname: Ramu
- Batting: Right-handed
- Bowling: Right arm leg break
- Role: Batsman

International information
- National side: West Indies (2000–2013)
- Test debut (cap 234): 18 May 2000 v Pakistan
- Last Test: 28 June 2011 v India
- ODI debut (cap 101): 20 July 2000 v England
- Last ODI: 11 June 2013 v India
- ODI shirt no.: 53
- T20I debut (cap 20): 11 September 2007 v South Africa
- Last T20I: 20 May 2010 v South Africa

Domestic team information
- Years: Team
- 1996–2014: Guyana
- 2005: Gloucestershire
- 2008: Kings XI Punjab
- 2012–2014: Leicestershire (squad no. 53)
- 2013–2014: Guyana Amazon Warriors
- 2016: Trinbago Knight Riders (squad no. 53)

Career statistics
Competition	Test	ODI	T20I	FC
Matches	87	181	18	220
Runs scored	5,842	5,804	298	13,405
Batting average	40.01	42.67	22.92	38.52
100s/50s	15/31	5/38	0/2	33/71
Top score	291	120*	59	291
Balls bowled	2,022	581	12	4,368
Wickets	23	16	2	56
Bowling average	50.56	36.62	5.00	41.98
5 wickets in innings	0	0	0	1
10 wickets in match	0	0	0	0
Best bowling	4/37	3/31	2/10	6/62
Catches/stumpings	53/–	45/–	7/–	155/–
Medal record
Men's Cricket
Representing West Indies
ICC Champions Trophy
Winner	2004 England
Runner-up	2006 India
- Source: ESPNcricinfo, 3 December 2021

Ramnaresh Ronnie Sarwan (born 23 June 1980) is a former Guyanese cricketer who played as a batsman. He is a former member and former captain of the West Indies cricket team, in all formats. Sarwan went on to average over 40 in both the test and one day international forms of cricket. He is considered to be one of the best West Indian batters of his generation. Sarwan was a member of the West Indies team that won the 2004 ICC Champions Trophy, and was subsequently the player of the tournament.

He was named as captain of the Guyana Amazon Warriors for the 2013 inaugural tournament of the Caribbean Premier League. Sarwan also played for Guyana, Gloucestershire, Kings XI Punjab and Leicestershire in his cricketing career.

== Youth career ==
Sarwan first became fond of cricket at primary school. He later became a member of the Georgetown Cricket Club, where he was mentored by the likes of Carl Hooper, Keith Semple and Roger Harper. Sarwan was a part of the Windies' squad for the 1998 Under-19 Cricket World Cup. The Caribbean team eventually lost to Bangladesh in the plate final. With a sum of 16 dismissals, he was the highest wicket taker at the tournament, in a tie with Mluleki Nkala of Zimbabwe.

== International career ==
=== Rise in ranks ===
Sarwan made his Test debut against Pakistan at Barbados in May 2000 – a match in which he was unbeaten in both innings including a first innings score of 84 not out. He missed scoring his maiden Test century against South Africa in March 2001 when he was run out for 91. His score of 78 in the second Test against India at Chennai in October 2002 was his fifth innings of 75+ that was not converted into a century. His maiden Test century came in his next Test series against Bangladesh at Dhaka. His next Test century came against Australia at St. John's in May 2003. As a part-time right arm leg-break bowler, Sarwan picked up his best test bowling figures, in June 2004, with 4 for 37 against Bangladesh.

In September of that year, the Windies went on to win the final of the 2004 ICC Champions Trophy against England with Sarwan being named as the player of the tournament.

With an investigation being led in 2004 by the International Cricket Council into most of the world's international-class bowlers, Sarwan was found to be the only bowler tested who did not transgress the Laws of Cricket regarding the straightening of the arm during delivery.

On 23 May 2006, Sarwan scored 115 not out in his hundredth one day international. This was the third game of a five match odi series played against India at the Warner Park Sporting Complex in Basseterre, St. Kitts.

On 23 June 2006, on his 26th birthday, while playing against India Sarwan hit six fours in an over off Munaf Patel at St. Kitts' Warner Park Sporting Complex. In so doing he equalled the record of Sandeep Patil with six fours hit off Bob Willis from seven deliveries, Sanath Jayasuriya with six fours hit off James Anderson in six balls and Chris Gayle with six fours hit off Matthew Hoggard from six deliveries.

Sarwan was dropped from the team for the second Test against Pakistan in November 2006. It was the first time in his six-year career that he had missed a game due to poor form. According to captain Brian Lara "It wasn't designed as a drop. We just wanted to make him aware of the situation and come back stronger. We need him and we need him to take control."

=== Captaincy ===
On 29 April 2007 it was announced that Sarwan was to succeed the retiring Brian Lara as captain of the West Indies following the team's exit from the 2007 World Cup.

During the second Test in the West Indies tour of England in May 2007, Sarwan injured his shoulder when he collided with a boundary fence while attempting to prevent a four. This shoulder injury ruled him out of the remainder of the tour and for a further ten months.

=== Post captaincy ===
Sarwan returned to the West Indies team in 2008 for the home series against Sri Lanka, as vice-captain to Chris Gayle. Throughout the series Sarwan scored over 50 in four consecutive innings, including a match-winning century, at an average of 77.75. He was also named man of the series for his batting feats.

In the subsequent 2008 Test series against Australia, Sarwan continued his fine batting form. With Sarwan scoring a half century and a matching saving 128 in the second Test at the Sir Vivian Richards Stadium in North Sound, Antigua. At the age 28 years, 228 days he became the youngest West Indian to reach the 5,000 runs milestone when he scored a century in the first Test of the 2009 home series against England at Sabina Park in Jamaica. In scoring his 13th Test match century Sarwan equalled the record for the most centuries in the fourth innings – a record he shared until 2017 with Sunil Gavaskar and Ricky Ponting. He went on to notch his highest test innings score, being 291 in the first innings of the fourth test of the said series played in March 2009 at Barbados' Kensington Oval. Sarwan's knock equalled the highest test innings of Vivian Richards which was also scored against England in 1976 at The Oval in South London.

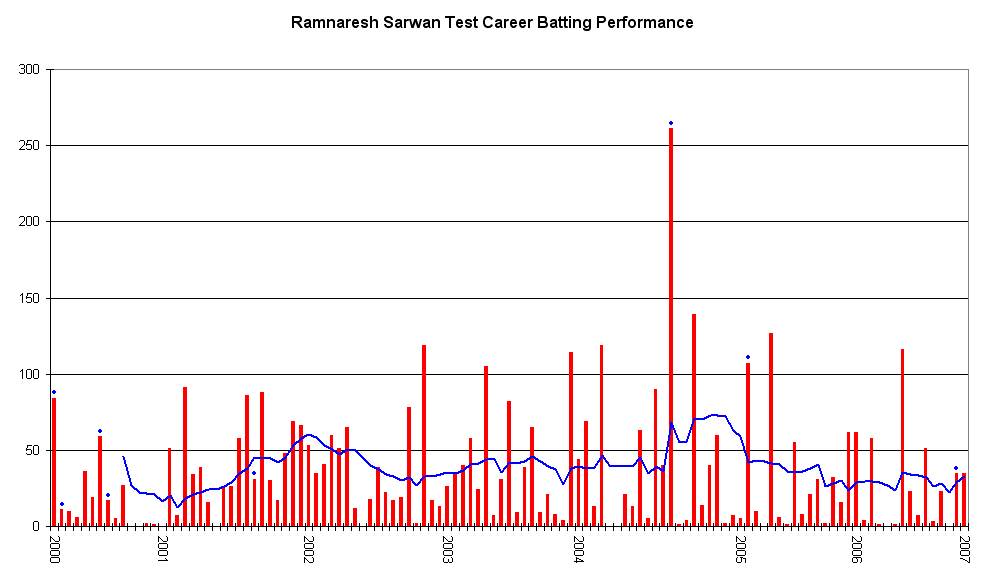
An innings-by-innings breakdown of Sarwan's Test match batting career, showing runs scored (red bars) and the average of the last ten innings (blue line)

=== Late career ===
Sarwan did however lose his central contract due to poor fitness and indifferent form. West Indies coach Ottis Gibson stated that leaving Sarwan out was a tough decision but he will make many contributions to the West Indies in the future and that he needs time to regain his form. Therefore, he wasn't selected for the tour of Sri Lanka along with regular wicket-keeper Denesh Ramdin.

He played his last international match as an ODI against India at The Oval on 11 June 2013. Sarwan announced his retirement from international cricket in September 2016.

== Domestic career ==
In July 2005 Sarwan signed for English county cricket team Gloucestershire. He later joined Indian Premier League outfit Kings XI Punjab for their 2008 season.

Having fallen out of international favour, Sarwan went on to sign for English county team Leicestershire for the 2012 English season. Sarwan had an impressive debut season in averaging 40.91 for the County Championship team. During December 2012 Sarwan was appointed Leicestershire's new skipper replacing former captain Matthew Hoggard.

== Controversy ==
Sarwan was accused of corruption and match-fixing in 2011, but his charges were dismissed. West Indies cricket official Ernest Hilaire cited irresponsible reporting as the reason rumours spread that batsman Ramnaresh Sarwan was under investigation for match-fixing. In 2020, Chris Gayle called Ramnaresh Sarwan 'worse than global pandemic'. However, the Caribbean Premier League (CPL) decided to close controversial issue.

== Style of play ==
For much of his career, Sarwan wore a bandana under his helmet whilst batting but dropped the practice due to a change in the design of helmet. He shared the habit of his fellow countrymen Shivnarine Chanderpaul and Narsingh Deonarine of marking his guard with a bail.

== Personal life ==
Sarwan was born in an Indo-Guyanese family to Kishan and Kumari Sarwan, as the eldest of their three children, in Wakenaam, an island in Guyana's Essequibo River. He later married Cindy Parsram as per Hindu rituals in 2013. They have three children together.

== Career best performances ==
as of 23 June 2013

	Batting				Bowling (innings)			
	Score	Fixture	Venue	Season	Figures	Fixture	Venue	Season
Tests	291	West Indies v England	Bridgetown	2009	4–37	West Indies v Bangladesh	Gros Islet	2004
ODI	120*	West Indies v Zimbabwe	Grenada	2013	3–31	West Indies v New Zealand	Lord's	2004
T20I	59	West Indies v England	Port of Spain	2009	2–10	West Indies v Bangladesh	Johannesburg	2007
FC	291	West Indies v England	Bridgetown	2009	6–62	Guyana v Leeward Islands	St. John's	2001
LA	120*	West Indies v Zimbabwe	Grenada	2013	5–10	Guyana v Bermuda	Essequibo	1998
T20	70	Guyana v Southern Redbacks	Johannesburg	2010	2–10	West Indies v Bangladesh	Johannesburg	2007
