= April 2006 in sports =

<<	April 2006					>>
Su	Mo	Tu	We	Th	Fr	Sa
						1
2	3	4	5	6	7	8
9	10	11	12	13	14	15
16	17	18	19	20	21	22
23	24	25	26	27	28	29
30
India; Sports

This list shows notable sports-related deaths, events, and notable outcomes that occurred in April of 2006.

== Deaths ==
- 28: Steve Howe
- 26: Russ Swan
- 24: Brian Labone
- 18: John Lyall
- 9: Jimmy Outlaw
- 9: Billy Hitchcock
- 6: Maggie Dixon

== Sporting seasons ==
- Auto racing 2006:
  - Formula One; GP2; BTCC
  - Indy Racing League
  - NASCAR; Busch; Craftsman Truck
  - World Rally Championship
- Cricket 2005–06: West Indies
- Football (soccer) 2006:
  - England: Premier League; England (general)
  - Scotland
  - Denmark: Superliga
  - France: Ligue 1;
  - UEFA Champions League;
    UEFA Cup
  - Argentina
- Rugby union 2005–06:
  - Heineken Cup, Super 14, Guinness Premiership
- U.S. and Canadian sports 2005–06:
  - 2006 Stanley Cup playoffs; 2006 NBA Playoffs

== Events in sports ==
=== 30 April 2006 (Sunday) ===
- Golf
  - PGA Tour: Chris Couch nabs his first-ever PGA Tour win at the Zurich Classic of New Orleans despite bogeying the 17th hole, and experiencing a weird 18th. On the last hole, Couch hit his drive into a cut of rough, then flew his second shot over the green into the back of the sand bunker behind it. With a funny stance, his third shot only left the bunker onto the rough in front of it. Couch then proceeded to hole his fourth shot to make par and win with an overall score of 19-under, defeating co-runners-up Charles Howell III and Fred Funk by one shot. It was a great ending to an odd week for Couch in the Big Easy. A week earlier, Couch had gotten lost in a bad part of New Orleans, then hitched a ride with strangers who took him into an even worse part of town, where he had to go to a tattoo parlor just to call police so they could help him find his car. (SI.com)
- NHL 2006 Stanley Cup playoffs
  - Colorado Avalanche 3, Dallas Stars 2 (OT): The plucky Avs pulled off an upset, eliminating the Pacific Division champions.
  - San Jose Sharks 2, Nashville Predators 1: The Sharks hang on to stifle the Tomas Vokoun-less Predators in five games.
- Auto racing: NASCAR NEXTEL Cup: The Aaron's 499 was postponed due to rain and will be run tomorrow (May 1).
- Basketball: EuroLeague Final Four
  - Championship: Maccabi Tel Aviv 69–73 **CSKA Moscow**
  - Third place: FC Barcelona 82–87 **TAU Cerámica**

=== 29 April 2006 (Saturday) ===
- American football
  - 2006 NFL draft top 11 selections:
    1. Houston Texans — Mario Williams, Delaware, NC State
    2. New Orleans Saints — Reggie Bush, RB, USC
    3. Tennessee Titans — Vince Young, QB, Texas
    4. New York Jets — D'Brickashaw Ferguson, OT, Virginia
    5. Green Bay Packers — A. J. Hawk, LB, Ohio State
    6. San Francisco 49ers — Vernon Davis, TE, Maryland
    7. Oakland Raiders — Michael Huff, S, Texas
    8. Buffalo Bills — Donte Whitner, S, Ohio State
    9. Detroit Lions — Ernie Sims, LB, Florida State
    10. Arizona Cardinals — Matt Leinart, QB, USC
    11. Denver Broncos — Jay Cutler, QB, Vanderbilt
    - Twelve ACC players are selected in the first round, a record for a conference.
    - Five Ohio State players are chosen in the first round. Besides Hawk and Whitner, the Dallas Cowboys pick LB Bobby Carpenter, the Pittsburgh Steelers WR Santonio Holmes and the New York Jets C Nick Mangold.
    - The biggest losers of the day are USC players. The Texans choose Williams over Bush, the 2006 Heisman Trophy winner, while Leinart, the 2005 Heisman winner, is not chosen until the tenth pick and RB LenDale White winds up going to Tennessee with the 13th pick of the second round (45th overall).
    - The Packers trade WR Javon Walker to the Broncos for a second-round draft pick.
- Football (soccer)
  - FA Premier League
    - Chelsea 3–0 Manchester United Chelsea clinches back-to-back Premier League Championships for the first time in the club's 100 year history. However, England's hopes for the 2006 World Cup may have suffered a blow when Man U's Wayne Rooney was injured in the 80th minute and will be out for six weeks with a metatarsal fracture in his right foot. (Premierleague.com)
    - Wigan Athletic 1—2 Portsmouth
    - Birmingham City 0—0 Newcastle United Portsmouth's win at JJB Stadium officially sends West Bromwich Albion to relegation while the Blues' scoreless draw at home also relegates them to the Football League Championship.
- Major League Baseball
  - Albert Pujols sets a new MLB record for home runs in April with 14. His solo shot in the bottom of the eighth inning gives the St. Louis Cardinals a 2–1 win over the Washington Nationals. (MLB.com)
- NHL 2006 Stanley Cup playoffs
  - New Jersey Devils 4, New York Rangers 2: The Devils swept the Rangers out of the playoffs with a convincing win at Madison Square Garden.
  - Ottawa Senators 3, Tampa Bay Lightning 2: The longest sports championship defense in modern history ended when the Senators knocked out the Lightning in five games. Tampa Bay won the Stanley Cup in 2004, and the 2004–05 season was cancelled due to the lockout between the owners and the players. The Toronto Blue Jays had held the previous record of over one and a half seasons due to the cancellation of the 1994 World Series.

=== 28 April 2006 (Friday) ===
- American football
  - 2006 NFL draft: The Houston Texans sign DE Mario Williams of NC State, and will take him with their #1 draft pick in the 2006 NFL Draft. (NFL.com) He received a six-year deal worth $54 million, including a $26.5 million signing bonus. (ESPN.com)
- Major League Baseball
  - In a 7–6 loss to the Cleveland Indians, Texas Rangers outfielder Kevin Mench hits a solo home run in the eighth inning, making him the first right-handed batter in MLB history to homer in seven consecutive games. Mench is one game shy of the record held by Dale Long, Don Mattingly, and Ken Griffey Jr. (MLB.com)
  - St. Louis Cardinals first baseman Albert Pujols hits his 13th homer of the season, a solo shot in the eighth inning of an 8–3 loss to the Washington Nationals. Pujols ties a major-league record for homers in April, previously set by Griffey in 1997 and Luis Gonzalez in 2001. (MLB.com)
- Basketball
  - EuroLeague Final Four from Sazka Arena, Prague: Semifinals
    - **Maccabi Tel Aviv** 85–70 TAU Cerámica The two-time defending champions win a rematch of the 2005 Euroleague final. (Euroleague.net)
    - FC Barcelona 75–84 **CSKA Moscow** The Russians come back from a 12-point deficit in the third quarter to advance to the final, ending a string of three consecutive losses in the Euroleague semis. (Euroleague.net)
- Rugby union
  - Sale Sharks defeat Bath 38–12 at Edgeley Park, Stockport, ensuring that they will finish on top of the table when the 2005–06 Guinness Premiership regular season finishes. (Guinnesspremiership.com)

=== 27 April 2006 (Thursday) ===
- Football (soccer): 2005–06 UEFA Cup, Semi-final, Second leg, teams progressing to the Final in **bold**.
  - **Sevilla** 1–0 Schalke 04 (aet) (Sevilla wins on aggregate 1–0.)
  - **Middlesbrough** 4–2 Steaua Bucharest (Middlesbrough wins on aggregate 4–3.) For the second successive round, Middlesbrough require to score four goals to win – and for the second successive round Massimo Maccarone scores the 4th goal in the 89th minute. (uefa.com)
- Major League Baseball
  - MLB Chief Operating Officer Bob DuPuy announced that Major League Baseball is prepared to select an ownership group for the Washington Nationals at the May 17 – 18 owners' meeting in New York City. MLB is asking for $450 million, and there are eight active bids, including one led by former Seattle Mariners owner Jeff Smulyan. (ESPN.com)

=== 26 April 2006 (Wednesday) ===
- Cricket: Brian Lara is appointed captain of the West Indian cricket team, his third stint as captain. This follows Shivnarine Chanderpaul's resignation earlier this month. (Cricinfo)
- Football (soccer): 2005–06 UEFA Champions League, Semi-final, Second leg, team progressing to the Final in **bold**.
  - **Barcelona** 0–0 A.C. Milan (Barcelona win 1–0 on aggregate) (uefa.com)

=== 25 April 2006 (Tuesday) ===
- Football (soccer): 2005–06 UEFA Champions League, Semi-final, Second leg, team progressing to the Final in **bold**.
  - Villarreal 0–0 **Arsenal** (Arsenal win 1–0 on aggregate) Jens Lehmann saves a last-minute penalty to ensure Arsenal proceed from a nervy semi-final, Arsenal's 10th successive Champions League match without conceding a goal. (uefa.com)
- Baseball
  - Former Major League star Brett Butler was admitted to a hospital after suffering chest pains following a Lancaster JetHawks Minor League game he was managing. The JetHawks are the High-A affiliate for the Arizona Diamondbacks in the California League.

=== 22 April 2006 (Saturday) ===
- Auto racing
  - Indy Racing League: Hélio Castroneves wins the 300-mile race at Twin Ring Motegi, Japan.
  - NASCAR: Kevin Harvick completes a weekend sweep of the spring races at Phoenix International Raceway by winning the NEXTEL Cup Subway Fresh 500 after taking the Busch Series Bashas' Supermarkets 200 the night before.
- Boxing: Wladimir Klitschko beats Chris Byrd in the seventh round to win the IBF world heavyweight champion.
- Major League Baseball
  - The Milwaukee Brewers hit a record-tying five home runs in the fourth inning, scoring seven runs, as they defeat the Cincinnati Reds, 11–0. Bill Hall, Damian Miller, Brady Clark and J. J. Hardy all hit their home runs off Brandon Claussen before the first out was recorded in the inning. Prince Fielder hit the fifth homer off Chris Hammond with two outs. Miller and Clark hit two-run homers, while the rest were solo. (MLB.com)
  - Barry Bonds hit his first home run of the season off Aaron Cook in the San Francisco Giants' 6–4 victory over the Colorado Rockies. With 709 career home runs, he is now within five of Babe Ruth's 714 for second on the all-time list. (MLB.com)

=== 20 April 2006 (Thursday) ===
- Cricket: Australian cricket team in Bangladesh in 2005–06
  - Australia defeats Bangladesh to win two-Test series 2–0.
    - Second Test at Chittagong: Bangladesh 197 (Rajin Saleh 71) and 304 (Shahriar Nafees 79, Mohammad Rafique 65, Warne 5/113) lose to Australia 581/4 declared (Gillespie 201 not out, Hussey 182) by an innings and 80 runs. (ABC Sport)
    - This match will be remembered for Jason Gillespie's remarkable double century, the only instance in Test cricket in which a nightwatchman passed 200. Gillespie later admitted it was "ridiculous ... I was just lucky that the shots came off and I had a bit of a laugh all the way."
- Football (soccer): 2005–06 UEFA Cup, Semi-final, first leg.
  - Schalke 04 0–0 Sevilla
  - Steaua Bucharest 1–0 Middlesbrough (UEFA.com)
- The Toronto Maple Leafs fire head coach Pat Quinn after the team fails to make the playoffs.

=== 19 April 2006 (Wednesday) ===
- Cricket: New Zealand in South Africa
  - First Test at Centurion: South Africa 276 and 299 (de Villiers 97) defeated New Zealand 327 (Oram 133, Vettori 81, Ntini 5/94) and 120 (Steyn 5/47, Ntini 5/51) by 128 runs. South Africa leads three-Test series 1–0. (Scorecard)
- Football (soccer): 2005–06 UEFA Champions League, Semi-final, first leg.
  - Arsenal 1–0 Villarreal In the last European match at Highbury, Arsenal take their Champions League record of clean sheets to 9. Villarreal suffer their first-ever loss against an English team. Kolo Touré scored the only goal of the match, to send Arsenal to Spain next Tuesday with an advantage. (uefa.com)
- Rugby union: Super 14
  - SA Rugby, the commercial arm of the South African Rugby Union, announces that the Southern Spears franchise will not be admitted to the Super 14 in 2007. The franchise had been controversially guaranteed a spot in the 2007 and 2008 competitions. (Planet-Rugby.com)

=== 18 April 2006 (Tuesday) ===
- Football (soccer): 2005–06 UEFA Champions League, Semi-final, first leg.
  - A.C. Milan 0–1 Barcelona Ludovic Giuly gives Barcelona the all-important away goal in this tie. (uefa.com)

=== 17 April 2006 (Monday) ===
- Football (soccer)
  - With a 1–0 win at Paris Saint-Germain, Lyon become the first team in French history to win five consecutive top division titles.

=== 15 April 2006 (Saturday) ===
- Football (soccer)
  - Liverpool mark the 17th anniversary of the Hillsborough disaster in 1989 that killed 96 fans. Originally scheduled to play Blackburn today, the match was put back by a day to allow for the Liverpool players to attend the memorial ceremony at Anfield.

=== 14 April 2006 (Friday) ===
- Football (soccer)
  - FA Premier League: Sunderland become the first team to be relegated to The Championship after a scoreless draw with Manchester United at Old Trafford. Sunderland have yet to win a home game this league season. (Premierleague.com)

=== 13 April 2006 (Thursday) ===
- Cricket: Australia in Bangladesh
  - First Test, Dhaka: Australia narrowly avoids defeat against Bangladesh, winning by three wickets in Dhaka. (Scorecard)
    - A Test century by Shahriar Nafees led Bangladesh to an impressive score of 427 in their first innings. Australia struggled, precariously placed at 145/6 at stumps on Day 2. On the third day of play, Adam Gilchrist led Australia's revival with an innings of 144. Bangladesh squandered their impressive lead, dismissed for 148 in the second innings, leaving Australia 307 runs to claim victory. Australian captain Ricky Ponting's undefeated innings of 118 guided Australia to victory midway through the fifth and final day's play. Australia leads the series 1–0, with one Test to play.

=== 11 April 2006 (Tuesday) ===
- Cricket: West Indies captain Shivnarine Chanderpaul announces his intention to resign as captain, effective immediately. A replacement will be announced soon. (Cricinfo Report)

=== 9 April 2006 (Sunday) ===
- Auto racing
  - NASCAR: For the second time this season, Kasey Kahne was on the pole and wins a NEXTEL Cup race, this time the Samsung/Radio Shack 500 at Texas Motor Speedway.
- Golf: Phil Mickelson wins The Masters for the second time in three years. His final round of 69 (3 under par) gave him a score of −7 for the tournament, two shots ahead of South African Tim Clark.
- Canadian football: The CFL announces the suspension of the Ottawa Renegades franchise for the 2006 season. (TSN)
- Football (soccer):
  - Dutch Eredivisie: With a 1–1 home draw against Groningen, PSV Eindhoven clinch their 19th Eredivisie title in Guus Hiddink's last season as coach.
- Rugby union
  - The London Wasps defeat the Llanelli Scarlets 26 points to 10 in the final of 2005–06 Powergen Cup to claim the championship at Twickenham in London.

=== 7 April 2006 (Friday) ===
- Football (soccer):
  - Germany national coach Jürgen Klinsmann announces that Jens Lehmann will be the team's first-choice goalkeeper for the 2006 FIFA World Cup over 2002 FIFA World Cup MVP Oliver Kahn.

=== 6 April 2006 (Thursday) ===
- Major League Baseball: Jimmy Rollins' hitting streak ends at 38 games as he went 0-for-4 in a Philadelphia Phillies 4–2 loss to the St. Louis Cardinals.
- Football (soccer): 2005–06 UEFA Cup – Quarter finals, second leg, progressing teams shown in **bold**.
  - Zenit St. Petersburg 1–1 **Sevilla**
  - **Schalke 04** 1–1 Levski Sofia
  - **Steaua Bucharest** 0–0 Rapid Bucharest
  - **Middlesbrough** 4–1 FC Basel: Middlesbrough stage an amazing comeback from their 2–0 first leg defeat, and after conceding an away goal to Basel, to score 4, the winner coming in the final minutes of the match. (UEFA.com)
- American football: The NFL releases its schedule for the 2006 season. This is the first year that the NFL will use a "flexible-scheduling" system in order to show the biggest games during prime time. In the system, new Sunday Night Football rights holder NBC will have a choice of all the games played on Sunday afternoons starting with Week 11. However, CBS and FOX will have the right to protect some of their biggest games.

=== 5 April 2006 (Wednesday) ===
- Major League Baseball: Phillies shortstop Jimmy Rollins extended his two-season hitting streak to 38 games with a lead-off double. However, the St. Louis Cardinals won the game, 4–3.
- Because of the ongoing investigation about player behavior, Duke University men's lacrosse coach Mike Pressler resigned, and in turn, the school announced the cancellation of the remainder of their 2006 season.
- Football: 2005–06 UEFA Champions League – Quarter finals, second leg, progressing teams in **bold**.
  - Juventus 0–0 Arsenal: Arsenal set a Champions League record of eight matches without conceding a goal.
  - **FC Barcelona** 2–0 Benfica (UEFA.com)
- Pakistan in Sri Lanka:
  - Second Test, Kandy: Mohammad Asif takes 11 wickets in the second Test match, including five for 27 in the second innings when Sri Lanka were bowled out for 73, as Pakistan turn a 109-run deficit on first innings into an eight-wicket win. Asif is named Man of the Match and Man of the Series. (Scorecard)
- Ice hockey: The University Cup, the symbol of the Canadian Interuniversity Sport men's ice hockey championship, is reported stolen by the Alberta Golden Bears. The Golden Bears had claimed their record 12th University Cup by beating the Lakehead Thunderwolves on March 27. TSN

=== 4 April 2006 (Tuesday) ===
- Cricket:
  - Australia in South Africa: Australia completes a clean-sweep of the three-Test series against South Africa after its victory in Johannesburg.
    - Third Test, Johannesburg: South Africa 303 (Prince 93) and 258 (Boucher 63) lose to Australia 270 (Hussey 73, Ntini 6/100) and 294/8 (Martyn 101, Hussey 89, Ntini 4/78) by two wickets. (Complete scorecard)
    - Justin Langer's landmark 100th Test. Unfortunately, the Australian opener was hit on the helmet by a Makhaya Ntini delivery and was forced to retire hurt, having faced only the one delivery. Langer played no further part in the Test.
- Football: 2005–06 UEFA Champions League – Quarter finals, second leg, progressing teams shown in **bold**.
  - **Villarreal** 1–0 Internazionale
  - **A.C. Milan** 3–1 Lyon: Lyon came within three minutes of progressing to their first-ever Champions League semi-final, before two late goals see Milan through for the third time in four years. (UEFA.com)
- 2006 NCAA Division I Women's Basketball Tournament, Final at TD Banknorth Garden, Boston, Massachusetts
  - (2 Albuquerque) Maryland 78, (1 Bridgeport) Duke 75 (OT)
- Major League Baseball
  - Toronto Blue Jays 6, Minnesota Twins 3

=== 3 April 2006 (Monday) ===
- 2006 NCAA Division I Men's Basketball Tournament, Final at RCA Dome, Indianapolis, Indiana
  - (3 Minneapolis) Florida 73, (2 Oakland) UCLA 57: Final Four Most Outstanding Player Joakim Noah leads the Gators to their first NCAA basketball championship, scoring 16 points and setting a championship-game record with six blocked shots.
- Major League Baseball, Opening Day Games
  - National League
    - New York Mets 3, Washington Nationals 2
    - Milwaukee Brewers 5, Pittsburgh Pirates 2
    - Chicago Cubs 16, Cincinnati Reds 7
    - St. Louis Cardinals 13, Philadelphia Phillies 5: The Phillies' Jimmy Rollins, who ended 2005 with a 36-game hitting streak, begins 2006 with a double in the opener, extending his two-season hitting streak to 37 games.
    - Colorado Rockies 3, Arizona Diamondbacks 2 (11 innings)
    - Atlanta Braves 11, Los Angeles Dodgers 10
    - Houston Astros 1, Florida Marlins 0
    - San Diego Padres 6, San Francisco Giants 1
  - American League
    - Boston Red Sox 7, Texas Rangers 3
    - Baltimore Orioles 9, Tampa Bay Devil Rays 6
    - Detroit Tigers 3, Kansas City Royals 1
    - Los Angeles Angels 5, Seattle Mariners 4
    - New York Yankees 15, Oakland Athletics 2

=== 2 April 2006 (Sunday) ===
- Major League Baseball, Opening Game
  - Chicago White Sox 10, Cleveland Indians 4
- 2006 NCAA Division I Women's Basketball Tournament, Final Four
  - At TD Banknorth Garden, Boston, Massachusetts
    - (2 Albuquerque) Maryland 81, (1 Cleveland) North Carolina 70
    - (1 Bridgeport) Duke 64, (1 San Antonio) LSU 45
- Rugby union Sevens:
  - In the final of the Hong Kong Sevens, Ben Gollings scores and converts a try at the death to enable England to defeat Fiji 26–24. The result narrows Fiji's lead over England in the World Sevens Series to 6 points.
- Auto racing
  - Formula One: Fernando Alonso wins the 2006 Australian Grand Prix, ahead of Kimi Räikkönen and Ralf Schumacher.
  - NASCAR: Tony Stewart pulled away late in the race to win the DirecTV 500 at Martinsville Speedway.

=== 1 April 2006 (Saturday) ===
- 2006 NCAA Division I Men's Basketball Tournament, Final Four
  - At RCA Dome, Indianapolis, Indiana
    - (3 Minneapolis) Florida 73, (11 Washington, D.C.) George Mason 58
    - (2 Oakland) UCLA 59, (4 Atlanta) LSU 45
