= June 2006 in sports =

<<	June 2006					>>
Su	Mo	Tu	We	Th	Fr	Sa
				1	2	3
4	5	6	7	8	9	10
11	12	13	14	15	16	17
18	19	20	21	22	23	24
25	26	27	28	29	30
India; Sports

This list shows notable sports-related deaths, events, and notable outcomes that occurred in June of 2006.

== Deaths ==
- 29: Randy Walker
- 7: Robert Taylor
- 5: Eric Gregg

== Sporting seasons ==
- Auto racing 2006:
  - Formula One; GP2; BTCC
  - Indy Racing League
  - NASCAR; Busch; Craftsman Truck
  - World Rally Championship
- Cricket 2006: England
- Football 2006:
- U.S. and Canadian sports 2005–06:
  - 2006 MLB season
  - 2006 CFL season

== Days of the month ==
=== 30 June 2006 (Friday) ===
- Football: FIFA World Cup, Quarter final
  - Germany 1 – 1 Argentina (a.e.t.) A 49th-minute header by Roberto Ayala shocks the huge German crowd, but competition top scorer Miroslav Klose scores his 5th in the 80th minute. No further goals, and so to penalties: both teams have previously been in three World Cup penalty shoot-outs and never lost. Germany win 4–2 on penalties.
  - Italy 3 – 0 Ukraine A 6th-minute goal by Gianluca Zambrotta gives Italy the lead. Luca Toni scores a header after 59 minutes following poor Ukrainian defending, and he scores a second ten minutes later.
- 2006 Tour de France: On the day before the prologue in Strasbourg, Jan Ullrich and Óscar Sevilla are suspended by their T-Mobile Team following an anti-doping investigation in Spain and Team CSC rider Ivan Basso has been excluded from the tour. Ullrich and Basso were considered the favorites to claim the overall yellow jersey following the retirement of Lance Armstrong following his seven straight championships. Also excluded from the tour is Francisco Mancebo (Ag2r). Astana-Würth has decided to withdraw its team, on the basis of five of their riders, including Joseba Beloki, appearing on the investigation list, which also removes Alexander Vinokourov from the tour. (BBC Sport)

=== 28 June 2006 (Wednesday) ===
- 2006 NBA draft: Andrea Bargnani is the first European player selected as the overall number one pick by the Toronto Raptors.
- MLB: New York Mets pitcher Pedro Martínez is given a standing ovation by fans of the Boston Red Sox as he returns to Fenway Park for the first time since leading them to the 2004 World Series championship, but the Red Sox beat their former ace by scoring eight runs off him (six earned) on seven hits in a 10–2 blowout of the Mets.

=== 27 June 2006 (Tuesday) ===
- Football: FIFA World Cup, Round of 16 (final day)
  - Brazil 3 – 0 Ghana Ronaldo scores within 5 minutes to become the all-time highest-scoring player in World Cup finals (15). Adriano scores from an offside position just before half time, despite Ghana having the bulk of possession. Ze Roberto ends the Brazilian scoring in the 84th minute as he breaks through the defence and beats Ghana goalkeeper Richard Kingson. Asamoah Gyan gets red carded late in the game for an attempted dive.
  - Spain 1 – 3 France Two evenly matched enterprising teams produce a fine advert for the beautiful game. A 28th-minute penalty by David Villa gives Spain the lead, while a 42nd-minute goal by Franck Ribéry following a beautiful run makes things all-square at half time. With seven minutes to full-time Patrick Vieira gives France the lead for the first time. Zinedine Zidane scores France's third goal in the 92nd minute to set up a rematch of the 1998 final against Brazil next Saturday in Frankfurt.

=== 26 June 2006 (Monday) ===
- Cricket: Indian cricket team in West Indies in 2006:
  - Third Test at St Kitts: Match drawn. Winning the toss and electing to bat, the West Indies compiled 581 in two-and-a-half days. Daren Ganga (135) and Ramnaresh Sarwan (116) scored centuries, while Indian spinner Harbhajan Singh claimed five wickets. India responded with 362 (VVS Laxman 100), short of the follow-on target, but Brian Lara opted to bat again. In the second innings, West Indies declared its innings closed at 172/6, giving India a victory target of 392 with under a day's play remaining. The visitors were unable to achieve the target in the time remaining, the Test ending in a draw. The four-Test series remains tied at 0–0. (Complete scorecard)
- Football: FIFA World Cup, Round of 16
  - Italy 1 – 0 Australia A fairly even match with Australia having most possession, conducted in a sporting manner despite Marco Materazzi's 50th minute dismissal for a scything tackle. Francesco Totti scores a penalty with the last kick of the match.
  - Switzerland 0 – 0 Ukraine A profoundly tedious match between two teams both afraid of losing – there was not a single offside decision in the whole first 90 minutes, the match goes into extra time, and ends up in a penalty shootout, which Ukraine wins 3–0.
- Baseball: NCAA College World Series Championship Series, Game 3 (best-of-three):
  - Oregon State 3, North Carolina 2. The Beavers, who won the series 2–1 over the Tar Heels, became the first northern-based CWS champions since Ohio State won in 1966, and the first to lose two CWS games since the introduction of the current format in 2002 thanks to Bill Rowe scoring on Tar Heels second baseman Bryan Steed's throwing error.

=== 25 June 2006 (Sunday) ===
- Auto racing
  - The Indianapolis Star reports that a merger is imminent between the Indy Racing League and the Champ Car series, leading to a single open-wheel series no earlier than 2008 with negotiations of co-ownership. This would end a war between the two when Indianapolis Motor Speedway broke away from what was the CART series to form the IRL.
  - NASCAR NEXTEL Cup: Jeff Gordon wins the Dodge/Save Mart 350.
- Baseball: NCAA College World Series Championship Series, Game 2 (best-of-three):
  - Oregon State 11, North Carolina 7. Oregon State evens the Championship Series on the power of a seven-run fourth inning. Series tied 1–1
- Football: FIFA World Cup, Round of 16
  - England 1 – 0 Ecuador David Beckham's first goal from a free kick for England since 2003, on the hour, separates the teams. (FIFA)
  - Portugal 1 – 0 Netherlands A Maniche goal midway through the first half gives Portugal the lead before the match gets out of hand and sees 16 yellow cards and 4 reds (a World Cup record for dismissals). (FIFA)

=== 24 June 2006 (Saturday) ===
- Baseball: NCAA College World Series Championship Series, Game 1 (best-of-three):
  - North Carolina 4, Oregon State 3. North Carolina leads series 1–0.
- Football: FIFA World Cup, Round of 16
  - Germany 2 – 0 Sweden Two goals by Lukas Podolski (4 and 12 minutes) give Germany a fantastic start. Henrik Larsson blows a 52nd minute Swedish penalty chance. Germany go into the last 8 in the World Cup for the 15th time. (FIFA)
  - Argentina 2 – 1 Mexico (a.e.t.) The game gets off to a scintillating start with two goals in the first nine minutes – Rafael Márquez puts Mexico ahead, then a goal by Hernán Crespo puts Argentina back on level terms. Still 1–1 at full-time, a wondergoal by Maxi Rodríguez in the eighth minute of extra time gives Argentina victory. (FIFA)
- Rugby Union: Mid-year Tests:
  - Argentina 19–25 New Zealand (José Amalfitani Stadium, Buenos Aires)
  - Australia 37–15 Ireland (Subiaco Oval, Perth)
    - Ireland take a 15–11 lead early in the second half, but the Wallabies pull away for a comfortable win. (BBC)
  - South Africa 26–36 France (Newlands, Cape Town)
    - Les Bleus send the Springboks to their first home defeat since Jake White took over as Boks coach in February 2004. (BBC)
- NHL: The 2006 NHL entry draft takes place at GM Place in Vancouver, British Columbia. American defenceman Erik Johnson goes first overall to the St. Louis Blues. Peterborough Pete Jordan Staal goes second to Pittsburgh, and University of North Dakota standout Jonathan Toews is taken third by the Chicago Blackhawks. (TSN)

=== 23 June 2006 (Friday) ===
- Football: FIFA World Cup, Group Phase (final day)
  - Group H: Saudi Arabia 0 – 1 Spain Saudi goalkeeper Mabrouk Zaid plays an inspired match as Spain, who had already advanced to the knockout stages, rest their entire first team and the young guns have trouble finding the net except for Juanito, scoring in the 36th minute. (FIFA)
  - Group H: Ukraine 1 – 0 Tunisia An uninspiring Ukrainian performance takes 70 minutes before Andriy Shevchenko sinks a penalty, advancing them to the elimination phase, even though Tunisia were reduced to 10 men before half time, with Ziad Jaziri's second yellow card. (FIFA)
  - Group G: Togo 0 – 2 France In this must-win match for France, they failed to break down the Togolese defence until Patrick Vieira scored in the 55th minute, followed six minutes later by Thierry Henry. (FIFA)
  - Group G: Switzerland 2 – 0 South Korea A first-half Philippe Senderos header gives the Swiss the lead, and Alexander Frei seals the win – and qualification – in the 77th minute on a controversial non-offside call. (FIFA)

=== 22 June 2006 (Thursday) ===
- MLB: In his first major-league game since coming back from retirement, Roger Clemens of the Houston Astros gives up two runs on six hits in five innings against the Minnesota Twins, but is charged with the loss as the Twins win, 4–2. Jason Kubel had a RBI Double, and Michael Cuddyer, an RBI single in the third inning of Minnesota's win. Meanwhile, Twins rookie pitcher Francisco Liriano pitched eight solid innings for the win. (AP)
- NHL: Joe Thornton of the San Jose Sharks wins the Hart Memorial Trophy as the Most Valuable Player at the NHL Awards show in Vancouver, British Columbia. Other major winners included Alexander Ovechkin of the Washington Capitals winning the Calder Memorial Trophy as Rookie of the Year, Lindy Ruff of the Buffalo Sabres winning the Jack Adams Trophy as Coach of the Year, Nicklas Lidström from the Detroit Red Wings as the winner of the Norris Trophy as the league's best defenceman, and Calgary Flames goalie Miikka Kiprusoff winning the Vezina Trophy as the most valuable goaltender. NHL.com
- NBA: After only one season, New York Knicks president and general manager Isiah Thomas fires head coach Larry Brown and names himself the new head coach.
- Football: FIFA World Cup, Group Phase
  - Group E: Czech Republic 0 – 2 Italy Jan Polák gets red carded near halftime, and the Czechs flame out to the Italians. Goal scorers for Italy were Marco Materazzi and Filippo Inzaghi. (FIFA)
  - Group E: United States 1 – 2 Ghana The USA is upset by the youngest team in the World Cup, and finish last in their group, extending their winless streak in World Cup competition at European sites to no wins, one draw and nine losses while Ghana progresses to the round of 16 in their first appearance to face Brazil. Clint Dempsey scored for USA in the 43rd with Haminu Draman and Stephen Appiah scoring for the Black Stars on a penalty kick following a controversial call. (FIFA)
  - Group F: Japan 1 – 4 Brazil Japan stun Brazil by taking the lead before Ronaldo equalizes just before half time, and also scores Brazil's fourth goal, equalling Gerd Müller's all-time record of 14 goals scored in the World Cup finals. (FIFA)
  - Group F: Croatia 2 – 2 Australia A pulsating match between two closely related teams (seven of the Australian squad have Croatian antecedents, and three of the Croatian team are Australian-born), which Croatia needed to win and Australia only to draw. Croatia score in the second minute, Australia score a penalty, a goalkeeping howler gifts Croatia a second goal, Harry Kewell puts Australia back on level terms; both sides are reduced to 10 men in the last 10 minutes, and referee Graham Poll forgets to red-card Josip Simunic for a second bookable offence, but does for a third. A third Australian goal is disallowed as the full-time whistle is blown as it is going in. Brazil and Australia progress from the group. (FIFA)

=== 21 June 2006 (Wednesday) ===
- Football: FIFA World Cup, Group Phase
  - Group D: Portugal 2–1 Mexico (FIFA)
  - Group D: Iran 1–1 Angola This result means that Mexico advances to the Round of 16. (FIFA)
  - Group C: Netherlands 0 – 0 Argentina Argentina wins the group on goal differential. (FIFA)
  - Group C: Ivory Coast 3 – 2 Serbia and Montenegro Côte d'Ivoire record their first WC Finals win, coming back from 0–2 down in the first half. (FIFA)

=== 20 June 2006 (Tuesday) ===
- 2006 NBA Finals Game 6: Miami Heat 95, Dallas Mavericks 92. Dwyane Wade scores 36 points and has 10 rebounds as Miami wins its first NBA championship in franchise history in six games, and is named Finals MVP. Dirk Nowitzki has 29 points and 15 rebounds for Dallas. Four Miami players have over 10 rebounds (Wade, Udonis Haslem, Antoine Walker and Shaquille O'Neal). The title is the fourth in the 2000s (decade) for O'Neal, the other three from 2000 to 2002 with the Los Angeles Lakers.
- Football: FIFA World Cup, Group Phase
  - Group A: Ecuador 0 – 3 Germany Miroslav Klose puts the hosts ahead in the 4th and 44th minutes, fellow ex-Pole Lukas Podolski scores in the 57th. (FIFA)
  - Group A: Costa Rica 1 – 2 Poland A 25th-minute goal by Ronald Gómez gives Costa Rica a good start, but a pair by Bartosz Bosacki in the 33rd and 66th minutes give Poland some consolation as both teams go home. (FIFA)
  - Group B: Sweden 2 – 2 England In a hard-fought match, Michael Owen suffers a serious knee injury in the first minute, Joe Cole scores a spectacular opening goal, Marcus Allbäck's second half equaliser is the 2,000th goal in World Cup Finals history since 1930. Steven Gerrard gives England the lead again in the 85th minute. Henrik Larsson equalises again in the 90th minute (the first Swede to score in 5 major tournaments). England still haven't beaten Sweden since 1968. (FIFA)
  - Group B: Paraguay 2 – 0 Trinidad and Tobago Brent Sancho's unfortunate headed own-goal gives Paraguay the lead, but Trini still fight doggedly to try to remain in the tournament, conceding another late goal. Both teams, however, still go home. (FIFA)

=== 19 June 2006 (Monday) ===
- NHL 2006 Stanley Cup Finals Game 7: Carolina Hurricanes 3, Edmonton Oilers 1. Aaron Ward's goal 1:26 into the game sparks the former Hartford Whalers franchise to their first Stanley Cup championship in seven games. Goaltender Cam Ward (not related) wins the Conn Smythe Trophy as the Series MVP, and becomes the third rookie goaler in the last 40 seasons to lead his team to the championship. The other two: Ken Dryden and Patrick Roy, both with the Montreal Canadiens.
- Football: FIFA World Cup, Group Phase
  - Group G: Togo 0 – 2 Switzerland Togo are eliminated, Switzerland goes top of the group, but any two of Switzerland, South Korea, and France can get to the second round. (FIFA)
  - Group H: Saudi Arabia 0 – 4 Ukraine Recovering from last week's thrashing by Spain, Ukraine equals their largest-ever winning score. (FIFA)
  - Group H: Spain 3 – 1 Tunisia Mnari gives Tunisia a shock lead in the 12th minute, Raúl starts a comeback in the 71st minute and Fernando Torres, the tournaments' leading scorer, scores from open play in the 76th minute and a 90th-minute penalty. Spain qualify for the second round, almost certainly as group leaders; Tunisia must beat Ukraine on Friday in order to qualify. (FIFA)

=== 18 June 2006 (Sunday) ===
- Major League Baseball: In order to draw attention to the fact that one in every six men get prostate cancer, the traditional "Seventh inning stretch" will be moved to the sixth inning today at all fifteen games. Monies raised from the auctioning off of light-blue colored bases and lineup cards that will be earmarked for research of the Prostate Cancer Foundation, as well as home runs that have been hit starting on June 7.
- Auto racing
  - NASCAR NEXTEL Cup: 3M Performance 400: Pole-sitter Kasey Kahne wins in a race shortened to 129 of the scheduled 200 laps because of rain.
  - 2006 24 Hours of Le Mans: The #8 Audi R10 of Frank Biela, Emanuele Pirro and Marco Werner wins the 74th edition of the Le Mans 24 Hours. They complete 380 laps in the 24-hour period, winning the race by 4 laps from the #17 Pescarolo–Judd of Éric Hélary, Franck Montagny and Sébastien Loeb, with the #7 Audi R10 of Rinaldo Capello, Tom Kristensen and Allan McNish third. Meanwhile, the #64 Chevrolet Corvette C6.R of Oliver Gavin, Olivier Beretta and Jan Magnussen wins the GT1 class, finishing 4th overall, the #25 RML MG-Lola of Thomas Erdos, Mike Newton and Andy Wallace wins the LMP2 class, and the all British crew of Tom Kimber-Smith, Richard Dean and Lawrence Tomlinson win the GT2 class, driving the #81 Panoz Esperante.
- 2006 NBA Finals Game 5: Miami Heat 101, Dallas Mavericks 100 (OT). Dwyane Wade scored 43 points, including a Finals game record 21 free throws, including the winning shots with 1.9 seconds left in the extra session to give the Heat a 3–2 series lead going back to Dallas. Jerry Stackhouse did not play for the Mavs due to a flagrant foul he committed in Game 4 against Shaquille O'Neal.
- Cycling
  - Jan Ullrich overcomes a 50-second deficit to win the Tour de Suisse in preparation for his bid at the 2006 Tour de France.
  - Team CSC captures the UCI ProTour's Eindhoven Team Time Trial.
- Football: FIFA World Cup, Group Phase
  - Group F: Japan 0 – 0 Croatia A close-fought battle ends all-square, which probably gives Croatia a slightly better chance of making the second round than Japan. (FIFA)
  - Group F: Brazil 2 – 0 Australia Adriano (46th min.) and Fred (89th min.) sink a battling Australia side who never gave up and remain second in the group. Brazil qualify for the last 16, Australia only need to draw against Croatia to qualify. (FIFA)
  - Group G: France 1 – 1 South Korea Thierry Henry scores France's first World Cup Finals goal since the 1998 Final against Brazil. After dominating the match for 80 minutes, France concede an equaliser by Park Ji-Sung. (FIFA)
- Golf: 2006 U.S. Open. Australian Geoff Ogilvy wins his first major championship, becoming the first Australian to win a men's golf major since Steve Elkington at the 1995 PGA Championship. Ogilvy survived a major 18th-hole collapse at Winged Foot Golf Club in Mamaroneck, New York that claimed Jim Furyk, Colin Montgomerie, and most notably Phil Mickelson, who was leading by a stroke heading into the final hole, but suffered a double bogey. Ogilvy's winning score of five over par (285) was the highest score to win since 1974's "Massacre at Winged Foot" when Hale Irwin shot seven over par (287).

=== 17 June 2006 (Saturday) ===
- NHL 2006 Stanley Cup Finals Game 6: Edmonton Oilers 4, Carolina Hurricanes 0: Fernando Pisani, Raffi Torres, Ryan Smyth and Shawn Horcoff score for Edmonton, who will return to Carolina in the deciding seventh game on Monday. Goaltender Jussi Markkanen stops 16 shots for the shutout. Series tied 3–3
- Football: FIFA World Cup, Group Phase
  - Group D: Portugal 2 – 0 Iran Portugal is ensured a berth in the Round of 16, while Iran is eliminated from the World Cup. (FIFA)
  - Group E: Czech Republic 0 – 2 Ghana Asamoah Gyan shocks the Czechs with a goal within 75 seconds of the start, and misses a penalty when Tomáš Ujfaluši is red-carded, although he himself is needlessly yellow-carded and misses the final group game. (FIFA)
  - Group E: Italy 1 – 1 United States An eventful match sees the USA reduced to 9 men, and Italy to 10, from early in the second half, and leaves Group E wide open. (FIFA)
- Rugby Union: Mid-year Tests:
  - Australia 43–18 England (Telstra Dome, Melbourne)
    - Mark Gerrard scores two tries to lead the Wallabies to an easy win. This is England's fifth consecutive Test defeat, their worst streak since 1984. George Gregan comes on as a substitute in the second half, earning his 120th cap and breaking the all-time record for international appearances of Jason Leonard (114 for England, five for the Lions). (BBC)
  - Argentina 45–27 Wales (José Amalfitani Stadium, Buenos Aires)
    - Los Pumas, led by 30 points from the boot of Federico Todeschini, score their largest win over Wales and also win a Test series against Wales for the first time. (BBC)
  - Fiji 29–18 Italy (Lawaqa Park, Lautoka)
  - New Zealand 27–17 Ireland (Eden Park, Auckland)
    - Unlike last week, the All Blacks did not have to come from behind, but still had to fight off a spirited Ireland side. (BBC)
  - Romania 14–62 France (Cotroceni Stadium, Bucharest)
  - South Africa 29–15 Scotland (EPRFU Stadium, Port Elizabeth)
    - Scotland score two tries to the Springboks' one, but seven penalties from Percy Montgomery see the Boks through to a comfortable win. Montgomery becomes the first Bok to score 600 Test points. (BBC) The Boks suffer a blow when 2004 World Player of the Year, flanker Schalk Burger, suffers a career-threatening neck injury. (BBC)

=== 16 June 2006 (Friday) ===
- Football: FIFA World Cup, Group Phase
  - Group C: Argentina 6 – 0 Serbia and Montenegro In one of the best World Cup finals matches in many tournaments, Argentina give a masterclass in possession football – Cambiasso's goal follows 23 consecutive passes – and a dire warning to all other competitors as the Argentines advance to the knockout phase. (FIFA)
  - Group C: Netherlands 2 – 1 Ivory Coast The Dutch take a two-goal lead before Côte d'Ivoire start to fight back, to no ultimate avail as they and Serbia and Montenegro are both eliminated from the second round. Didier Drogba is yellow-carded and will miss next Tuesday's final match. (FIFA)
  - Group D: Mexico 0 – 0 Angola A hugely embarrassing result for world 4th-ranked Mexico, who failed to break down neophytes Angola, who were reduced to 10 men eleven minutes from the end. (FIFA)
- Baseball: Houston Astros pitcher Roger Clemens allowed three runs in the first inning, but held on to win in his third minor league tune-up game as the Triple-A Round Rock Express defeated the Washington Nationals-affiliate New Orleans Zephyrs, 7–4. He only allowed two more hits and three walks in a total of 5 2/3 innings for the win, and threw five strikeouts. At the plate, he struck out twice, going 0-for-2. Nolan Ryan, Hall of Fame former pitcher and Round Rock Express owner, was in attendance.
- Golf: U.S. Open. Tiger Woods misses his first cut in a major golf tournament as a professional when he shoots 12 over par after the first two rounds at Winged Foot's West Course. The 39 straight majors without missing the cut tied him with Jack Nicklaus.

=== 15 June 2006 (Thursday) ===
- NBA:
  - 2006 NBA Finals Game 4: Miami Heat 98, Dallas Mavericks 74. Dwyane Wade deposited 36 points while the Mavs were limited to a total of seven fourth quarter points, a new Finals all-time low. The series is now guaranteed to return to Dallas Tuesday (June 20). Series tied at 2–2
  - Non-Finals news: Charlotte Bobcats principal owner Robert L. Johnson announces that Michael Jordan has become a minority owner in the team. Jordan will run the Bobcats' basketball operations. (Charlotte Bobcats)
- Football: FIFA World Cup, Group Phase
  - Group A: Ecuador 3 – 0 Costa Rica This result confirms the elimination of Costa Rica and Poland even before they play each other. Ecuador meet Germany next Tuesday to determine who wins first and second place in the group (Ecuador currently leads on goal difference). (FIFA)
  - Group B: England 2 – 0 Trinidad and Tobago The arrival of Wayne Rooney in the 58th minute as a substitute for Michael Owen injects urgency into the English attack, which still could not break down a redoubtable T&T defence until Peter Crouch scored in the 83rd minute. Steven Gerrard scored in the 91st minute. England qualify for the second round. (FIFA)
  - Group B: Sweden 1 – 0 Paraguay Freddie Ljungberg scores an 89th-minute goal to relieve the vast throng of Swedish fans in Berlin's Olympiastadion. This eliminates Paraguay from the second round; Trinidad and Tobago retain a theoretical possibility of making the second round if England beat Sweden, and T&T beat Paraguay by a sufficient margin next Tuesday. (FIFA)

=== 14 June 2006 (Wednesday) ===
- Cricket: India in the West Indies:
  - Second Test at Beausejour Stadium, St Lucia: Match drawn. After winning the toss and electing to bat, India compiled an impressive 588/8 declared, with three batsmen – Wasim Jaffer (180), Mohammed Kaif (148), and captain Rahul Dravid (146) – scoring centuries. The West Indies lost early wickets and were unable to recover, scoring only 215. The West Indies required another 373 runs just to make India bat again, with three days remaining. Persistent rain interruptions and a patient Brian Lara century (120) allowed the West Indies to bat out the remaining time. The third and final Test begins in St Kitts on 22 June. (Scorecard)
- Rugby league: State of Origin, Australia:
  - Game 2 at Suncorp Stadium, Brisbane: Queensland defeats New South Wales 30–6, levelling the three-match series after the New South Wales victory on May 24. The deciding match will be played in Melbourne on July 5. (ABC Australia)
- NHL 2006 Stanley Cup Finals Game 5: Edmonton Oilers 4, Carolina Hurricanes 3 (OT). Fernando Pisani's short-handed breakaway goal just 3:31 into the overtime sends the series back to Alberta for Game 6 Saturday (June 17). It also marks the first time a short-handed goal ended a Stanley Cup Finals game. Carolina leads series 3–2
- Football: FIFA World Cup, Group Phase
  - Group H: Spain 4 – 0 Ukraine David Villa scored two goals in a rout of the World Cup newcomers. (FIFA)
  - Group H: Tunisia 2 – 2 Saudi Arabia (FIFA)
  - Group A: Germany 1 – 0 Poland A resolute Polish defense – reduced to 10 men in the 75th minute – keeps the Germans out until supersub Oliver Neuville scores in the 91st minute. (FIFA)

=== 13 June 2006 (Tuesday) ===
- 2006 NBA Finals Game 3: Miami Heat 98, Dallas Mavericks 96. Dwyane Wade scored 42 points and the Heat guaranteed extending the series to five games with their first Finals game win. Dallas leads series 2–1
- Football: FIFA World Cup, Group Phase
  - Group F: Brazil 1 – 0 Croatia A slightly disappointing performance from Brazil, winning on Kaká's 44th-minute goal, even with an out-of-sorts Ronaldo. (FIFA)
  - Group G: South Korea 2 – 1 Togo Togo score their first-ever goal in the Finals, but 2002's 4th placed side score two cracking goals to take victory. (FIFA)
  - Group G: France 0 – 0 Switzerland Eight yellow cards (5 Swiss, 3 French) in a generally uninspiring match. (FIFA)

=== 12 June 2006 (Monday) ===
- NFL: Pittsburgh Steelers quarterback and Super Bowl XL star Ben Roethlisberger is injured in a motorcycle accident in Pittsburgh.
- NHL 2006 Stanley Cup Finals, Game 4: Carolina Hurricanes 2, Edmonton Oilers 1. Clutch goaltending by Edmonton native Cam Ward and goals by Cory Stillman and Mark Recchi put the former Hartford Whalers franchise one step away from their first Stanley Cup. Carolina leads series 3–1
- Football (soccer): FIFA World Cup, Group Phase
  - Group E: United States 0 – 3 Czech Republic A comprehensive defeat of a one-dimensional US team by the reputedly "oldest team in the tournament", including two goals scored by Tomáš Rosický. However, the all-time leading Czech international goal scorer, Jan Koller, is stretchered off after suffering a hamstring injury late in the first half after scoring the first goal of the game in the fifth minute. (FIFA)
  - Group E: Italy 2 – 0 Ghana (FIFA)
  - Group F: Australia 3 – 1 Japan After trailing from the 27th minute, the "Socceroos" stage a last-gasp comeback with Tim Cahill scoring the country's first-ever WC Finals goals in the 84th and 89th minutes, with John Aloisi wrapping things up in the 92nd minute. (FIFA)
  - Non-World Cup news:
    - Former Manchester United and Republic of Ireland great Roy Keane, currently with Celtic, retires due to a persistent hip condition at the age of 34.

=== 11 June 2006 (Sunday) ===
- Football: FIFA World Cup, Group Phase
  - Group C: Serbia and Montenegro 0 – 1 Netherlands (FIFA)
  - Group D: Mexico 3 – 1 Iran (FIFA)
  - Group D: Angola 0 – 1 Portugal (FIFA)
- Auto racing: Rookie pole sitter Denny Hamlin wins the NASCAR NEXTEL Cup Pocono 500.
- Arena Football League:
  - ArenaBowl XX in Las Vegas, Nevada: Chicago Rush 65, Orlando Predators 61. The Rush becomes the first team with a sub-.500 regular season record (7–9) and win four games on the road to win the AFL Championship.
- 2006 NBA Finals, Game 2: Dallas Mavericks 99, Miami Heat 85. The Mavs converted two four-point plays, and Dirk Nowitzki had 26 points and 16 rebounds, while Dwyane Wade led Miami with 23 points. Shaquille O'Neal was limited to five points. Dallas leads series 2–0
- Tennis: Roland Garros (French Open) – Men's singles Finals
  - Rafael Nadal def. Roger Federer, 1–6 6–1 6–4 7–6(4)
- Rugby Union — Mid-year Tests:
  - Australia 34–3 England (Telstra Stadium, Sydney)
    - The Wallabies hammer a young and mistake-prone England side. (BBC)
  - Argentina 27–25 Wales (Estadio Raúl Conti, Puerto Madryn)
    - Los Pumas claim a Six Nations scalp in a closely fought affair. The visitors were received warmly before the match, as it was held in a region settled by Welsh in the 1860s where Welsh is still widely spoken. (BBC)
- Baseball
  - Roger Clemens of the Houston Astros strikes out eleven for the Double-A Texas League's Corpus Christi Hooks, allowing two hits and no runs in six innings. He set a new club record for strikeouts in one game. The Hooks beat the Seattle Mariners affiliate San Antonio Missions 5–1, earning Clemens the victory. (ESPN) (MinorLeagueBaseball.com)

=== 10 June 2006 (Saturday) ===
- Football: FIFA World Cup, Group Phase
  - Group B: England 1 – 0 Paraguay (FIFA)
  - Group B: Trinidad and Tobago 0 – 0 Sweden Tiny T&T, the smallest nation ever to qualify for the Finals, refuse to be beaten even after being reduced to 10 men thirty seconds into the second half. (FIFA)
  - Group C: Argentina 2 – 1 Ivory Coast (FIFA)
- Boxing: In what was likely his last fight, Bernard Hopkins wins the light-heavyweight championship of the world with a unanimous decision over Antonio Tarver in Atlantic City, New Jersey.
- NHL 2006 Stanley Cup Finals, Game 3: Edmonton Oilers 2, Carolina Hurricanes 1: Ryan Smyth's goal with 2:15 remaining wins the game for the Oilers in front of their home crowd. Shawn Horcoff also scores for Edmonton, while Rod Brind'Amour scores for Carolina. Carolina leads series 2–1 (Yahoo)
- Rugby Union — Mid-year Tests:
  - New Zealand 34–23 Ireland (Waikato Stadium, Hamilton)
    - The top-ranked All Blacks retain their all-time unbeaten record against Ireland, but had to come back from a 23–15 deficit with nine minutes to go. (BBC)
  - South Africa 36–16 Scotland (ABSA Stadium, Durban)
    - Early tries from Schalk Burger and Breyton Paulse stake the Springboks to a lead that they never relinquished. The final result was Scotland's worst-ever loss in South Africa, and keeps Scotland's winless record on South African soil intact. (BBC) (Planet-Rugby.com)
- Triple Crown of Thoroughbred Racing: Jazil, ridden by 18-year-old Fernando Jara, wins the 138th running of the Belmont Stakes. The race was "watered down" because neither Barbaro (the Kentucky Derby winner) or Preakness winner Bernardini competed, the former due to a career-ending injury, and the latter because of scheduling.

=== 9 June 2006 (Friday) ===
- Football: FIFA World Cup, Group Phase
  - Group A: Germany 4 – 2 Costa Rica (FIFA)
  - Group A: Ecuador 2 – 0 Poland (FIFA)

=== 8 June 2006 (Thursday) ===
- Football: Pre-World Cup friendly:
  - Luxembourg 0 – 3 Ukraine
- 2006 NBA Finals Game 1: Dallas Mavericks 90, Miami Heat 80: Jason Terry leads the Mavs with 32 points; Shaquille O'Neal misses eight of nine free throws. Dallas leads series 1–0

=== 7 June 2006 (Wednesday) ===
- Football: Pre-World Cup friendlies:
  - Australia 3 – 1 Liechtenstein
  - France 3 – 1 China: In a major blow for France, Djibril Cissé suffers a broken leg in an innocuous tackle. (FIFA)
  - Spain 2 – 1 Croatia
- NHL 2006 Stanley Cup Finals Game 2: Carolina Hurricanes 5, Edmonton Oilers 0: Jussi Markkanen starts for the Oilers, but concedes five goals, three of them on power plays. Cam Ward stops all of the Oilers' 25 shots, becoming the first rookie goalie since Patrick Roy to have a clean slate in a Stanley Cup Finals game. Carolina leads series 2–0

=== 6 June 2006 (Tuesday) ===
- Cricket: India in the West Indies:
  - First Test at Antigua Recreation Ground, St. John's, Antigua Match drawn. After winning the toss and batting, India reached a total of 241 in its first innings. West Indies replied with 371, half-centuries to Gayle, Bravo and Sarwan. In its second innings, a double century (212) to Wasim Jaffer guided India to 521/6 declared. West Indies required 392 runs to win. The Test ended in a draw after the West Indies were able to bat through the entire day. (Scorecard)
- Baseball
  - Houston Astros pitcher Roger Clemens throws six strikeouts in his first minor-league tune-up start for the Class-A Lexington Legends, who defeated the Lake County Captains, 5–1. Clemens allowed three hits, including a home run to Johnny Drennen, and hit one batter. He only pitched three innings, failing to qualify for the decision. (MLB.com)

=== 5 June 2006 (Monday) ===
- Cricket: Sri Lanka in England
  - Third Test at Trent Bridge, Nottingham: Sri Lanka wins by 134 runs to tie three-Test series 1–1. Sri Lanka, having won the toss and electing to bat, compiled 231 in their first innings, courtesy of a solid performance from the Sri Lankan tail. England replied with 229. In its second innings, half-centuries to Kumar Sangakkara and Chamara Kapugedera lifted the visitors to a total of 322, English bowler Monty Panesar taking 5/78. England required 325 runs to win. Victory was thwarted by Muttiah Muralitharan, who claimed 8/70 as England were dismissed for 190. (Scorecard)
- Football: Pre-World Cup friendly:
  - Ukraine 3 – 0 Libya
- NHL 2006 Stanley Cup Finals Game 1: Carolina Hurricanes 5, Edmonton Oilers 4: Rod Brind'Amour scores on a turnover by substitute goalie Ty Conklin, in for the injured Dwayne Roloson who is out for the rest of the season with a knee injury, with 32 seconds left in regulation to give the 'Canes first blood in the Stanley Cup finals. The Oilers' Chris Pronger scores on a penalty shot, the first time in eleven attempts in a Stanley Cup Finals game. Carolina leads series 1–0

=== 4 June 2006 (Sunday) ===
- Football:
  - The Netherlands wins the UEFA U-21 Championship 2006, defeating Ukraine 3–0 in the final.
  - Pre-World Cup friendlies:
    - Japan 1 – 0 Malta
    - Netherlands 1 – 1 Australia
    - Brazil 4 – 0 New Zealand
    - Ivory Coast 3 – 0 Slovenia
    - South Korea 1 – 3 Ghana
- Rugby union sevens:
  - In the final event of the 2005–06 World Sevens Series, held at Twickenham in London, Fiji clinch the overall series crown by defeating Kenya in the quarterfinals, and go on to win the London Sevens after defeating New Zealand in the semifinals and Samoa in the final. Fiji becomes the first team other than New Zealand to win the overall title in the seven-year history of the competition. (BBC)
- Arena Football League
  - National Conference Championship Game
    - Orlando Predators 45, Dallas Desperados 28
- Auto racing:
  - NASCAR NEXTEL Cup: Matt Kenseth rallies to pass Roush Racing teammate Jamie McMurray with two laps left to win the Neighborhood Excellence 400 presented by Bank of America

=== 3 June 2006 (Saturday) ===
- Arena Football League
  - American Conference Championship Game
    - Chicago Rush 59, San Jose SaberCats 56
- Baseball: In a wild game during the 2006 NCAA Baseball Tournament, North Carolina-Wilmington defeated Maine by the score of 21–19.
- Football: Pre-World Cup friendlies.
  - England 6 – 0 Jamaica
  - Czech Republic 3 – 0 Trinidad and Tobago
  - Poland 1 – 0 Croatia
  - Switzerland 4 – 1 China
  - Luxembourg 0 – 3 Portugal
  - Spain 2 – 0 Egypt
- 2006 NBA Playoffs
  - Western Conference Finals, Game 6
    - Dallas Mavericks 102, Phoenix Suns 93: The Mavs make history as they win the series 4–2 thanks to Dirk Nowitzki's 24 points and 10 rebounds and Josh Howard collected 20 and 15. Jerry Stackhouse added 13 of his team's 19 points in the fourth period, as the Mavs outscored the Suns by 13 in the quarter. The Mavs will host the Miami Heat starting Thursday (June 8) in the 2006 NBA Finals.
- Horse racing:
  - Triple Crown of Thoroughbred Racing
    - United Kingdom:
      - Sir Percy, ridden by Martin Dwyer, wins the Derby at Epsom Downs Racecourse. The 6/1 shot, trained by Marcus Tregoning, fended off three other horses in one of the tightest finishes of the Derby's long history. It beat off the 66/1 outsider Dragon Dancer, ridden by Darryll Holland, by a short head, with Dylan Thomas, ridden by Johnny Murtagh, finishing third at a price of 25/1. Pre-race favourite Visindar finished 5th after jockey Christophe Soumillon was boxed in. Horatio Nelson, the mount of Kieren Fallon, suffered a fracture to his front left leg while in the closing stages. After the race, the horse had to be put down. (BBC)

=== 2 June 2006 (Friday) ===
- Football: Pre-World Cup friendlies.
  - Germany 3 – 0 Colombia
  - Sweden 1 – 1 Chile
  - Liechtenstein 0 – 1 Togo
  - Angola 2 – 3 Turkey
  - Tunisia 0 – 0 Uruguay
  - Italy 0 – 0 Ukraine
- 2006 NBA Playoffs
  - Eastern Conference Final, Game 6
    - Miami Heat 95, Detroit Pistons 78: The Heat advanced to their first NBA Finals in franchise history, winning the series 4–2 thanks to Shaquille O'Neal's 28 points and 16 rebounds. The Heat will meet the winner of the Western Conference Finals starting on Thursday, June 8.

=== 1 June 2006 (Thursday) ===
- Football: Pre-World Cup friendlies.
  - Norway 0 – 0 South Korea
  - Netherlands 2 – 1 Mexico
- NHL 2006 Stanley Cup playoffs
  - Eastern Conference Final, Game 7
    - Carolina Hurricanes 4, Buffalo Sabres 2: Rod Brind'Amour registered the conference-winning goal for the 'Canes, and with their 4–3 series win, will host the Edmonton Oilers to begin the Stanley Cup Finals on Monday, June 5.
- 2006 NBA Playoffs
  - Western Conference Final, Game 5
    - Dallas Mavericks 117, Phoenix Suns 101 Dallas leads series 3–2
