= May 2006 in sports =

<<	May 2006					>>
Su	Mo	Tu	We	Th	Fr	Sa
	1	2	3	4	5	6
7	8	9	10	11	12	13
14	15	16	17	18	19	20
21	22	23	24	25	26	27
28	29	30	31
India; Sports

This list shows notable sports-related deaths, events, and notable outcomes that occurred in May of 2006.

== Deaths ==
- 27: Craig "Ironhead" Heyward
- 16: Dan Ross
- 14: Jim Lemon
- 11: Floyd Patterson
- 4: Jim Delsing
- 3: Earl Woods

== Sporting seasons ==
- Auto racing 2006:
  - Formula One; GP2; BTCC
  - Indy Racing League
  - NASCAR; Busch; Craftsman Truck
  - World Rally Championship
- Cricket 2006: England
- Football (soccer) 2006:
  - England (general)
  - Scotland
  - Denmark: Superliga
  - Argentina
- U.S. and Canadian sports 2005–06:
  - 2006 Stanley Cup playoffs; 2006 NBA Playoffs
  - 2006 MLB season

== 31 May 2006 (Wednesday) ==
- Football: Pre-World Cup friendlies
  - Italy 1 – 1 Switzerland
  - France 2 – 0 Denmark
  - Paraguay 1 – 0 Georgia
  - Slovenia 3 – 1 Trinidad and Tobago
  - Bosnia and Herzegovina 2 – 5 Iran
- Baseball: Roger Clemens returns to baseball by signing a contract with the Houston Astros. The deal will pay him up to $12.6 million for the rest of the season. On Tuesday, he is to pitch for the Lexington Legends, the Astros' Single-A farm team, for whom Clemens' son Koby plays. (AP)
- Football: Chelsea F.C. announce that they have signed former A.C. Milan and FC Dynamo Kyiv striker Andriy Shevchenko for a British record transfer of £34 million. BBC, UEFA
- Cycling: 7-time winner of the Tour de France Lance Armstrong is cleared of drug abuse allegations dating back to 1999. (Forbes)
- 2006 NBA Playoffs
  - Eastern Conference Final, Game 5
    - Detroit Pistons 91, Miami Heat 78 Miami leads series 3–2

== 30 May 2006 (Tuesday) ==
- Football: Pre-World Cup friendlies
  - With only nine days to go to the start of the World Cup, coaches are fine-tuning their teams and tactics. (Guardian)
  - Argentina 2 – 0 Angola
  - Ivory Coast 1 – 1 Chile
  - Czech Republic 1 – 0 Costa Rica
  - England 3 – 1 Hungary
    - At 17 years and 75 days, Theo Walcott becomes the youngest person ever to play for the senior England team.
  - Japan 2 – 2 Germany
    - Japan take an unexpected 2-goal lead over Germany before being pulled back.
  - Poland 1 – 2 Colombia
    - Colombian goalkeeper Luis Enrique Martinez scores a goal with a goal kick that went the entire length of the pitch.
  - Tunisia 3 – 0 Belarus
- 2006 NBA Playoffs
  - Western Conference Final, Game 4
    - Phoenix Suns 106, Dallas Mavericks 86 Series tied 2–2
- NHL 2006 Stanley Cup playoffs
  - Eastern Conference Final, Game 6
    - Buffalo Sabres 2, Carolina Hurricanes 1 (OT): Danny Briere's overtime power play goal forces a seventh game Thursday (June 1) at Carolina. Series tied 3–3

== 29 May 2006 (Monday) ==
- 2006 NBA Playoffs
  - Eastern Conference Final, Game 4
    - Miami Heat 89, Detroit Pistons 78 Miami leads series 3–1

== 28 May 2006 (Sunday) ==
- Baseball
  - Barry Bonds hits his 715th career home run, a two-run shot off Byung-hyun Kim in a home game against the Colorado Rockies. The home run puts Bonds past Babe Ruth for second place on the career homer list, behind only Hank Aaron, who had 755. The Rockies, however, go on to win 6–2. (AP)
- Cycling
  - Giro d'Italia: German sprinter Robert Förster wins the last stage of the Giro. Ivan Basso maintains his position and has therefore won the Giro.
- Auto racing
  - Formula One: Grand Prix of Monaco
    - Championship leader Fernando Alonso wins the Monaco Grand Prix after his main rivals fall by the wayside. He wins by 14.5 seconds from the McLaren of Juan Pablo Montoya, while David Coulthard finished 3rd, to ensure the first podium ever for Red Bull Racing. No champagne was sprayed on the podium, as a mark of respect to the CEO of Michelin, Édouard Michelin who died in a boating accident on 26 May. (Formula One), (BBC)
  - IndyCar: 90th Indianapolis 500
    - Sam Hornish Jr. wins his first-ever Indianapolis 500 after beating Marco Andretti by just 6 feet, despite having to serve a drive-through penalty 30 laps from the end after leaving the pits with his fuel-hose still attached.
  - NASCAR NEXTEL Cup: Kasey Kahne wins the Coca-Cola 600 in Concord, North Carolina
- 2006 NBA Playoffs
  - Western Conference Final, Game 3
    - Dallas Mavericks 95, Phoenix Suns 88 Dallas leads series 2–1
- NHL 2006 Stanley Cup playoffs
  - Eastern Conference Final, Game 5
    - Carolina Hurricanes 4, Buffalo Sabres 3 (OT) Carolina leads series 3–2
- CHL Memorial Cup
  - The Quebec Remparts get a measure of revenge against their QMJHL championship counterparts, the Moncton Wildcats by defeating them on their home ice 6–2 to win the 2006 Memorial Cup.
- Cricket: Sri Lanka in England:
  - Second Test at Edgbaston, Birmingham: England defeats Sri Lanka by six wickets. After winning the toss and batting, Sri Lanka were dismissed for a paltry 141, the wickets shared equally between the five used English bowlers. England's reply of 295 was centred on a century (142) by Kevin Pietersen; the next highest English score was 30. Muttiah Muralitharan claimed his 52nd five-wicket haul and his 15th ten-wicket haul, taking 6/86. A 125-run partnership between Michael Vandort and Tillakaratne Dilshan guide Sri Lanka to 231 in its second innings, an overall lead of only 78 runs: England reached the target with six wickets to spare. (Cricinfo Scorecard)

== 27 May 2006 (Saturday) ==
- Rugby union: 2006 Super 14 Final
  - Crusaders 19, Hurricanes 12: The Crusaders win the first Super 14 title after beating the Hurricanes in a game that was dampened by the conditions. Thick fog covered the ground close to an hour before kick off and despite talks to delay or postpone the game, the final went ahead as scheduled. Many fans in the ground and watching on television were unable to see much of the game and also hampered the calling of the game by the commentators. While the fog overshadowed the game itself, the Crusaders completely dominated territory and possession throughout the match. Much of the game was decided on penalties before Casey Laulala dived over late in the second half for the first try of the match and gave the Crusaders a seven point advantage and secured their sixth Super Rugby title. Stuff (Sport)
- Auto racing: Michael Schumacher is disqualified from pole position for the 2006 Monaco Grand Prix after it is ruled that he intentionally spun at Rascasse hairpin as time in the third and final session of qualifying ran up slowing down the cars behind him, including Fernando Alonso who then qualified 0.064 seconds off Schumacher's pace. Schumacher is relegated to the back of the grid, while Alonso will start from pole, promoting Mark Webber to 2nd. Alonso's teammate Giancarlo Fisichella is docked his three fastest laps for blocking David Coulthard, resulting in a demotion from 5th to 9th on the grid. (BBC)
- Cycling
  - Giro d'Italia: Ivan Basso wins the penultimate stage of the Giro, his third so far. Basso also takes considerable time out of all the other competitors, and with one stage to go, he has a 9-minute over the next placed rider in the contest for the Maglia rosa.
- Mixed martial arts
  - Current UFC Lightweight Champion Matt Hughes defeats former UFC champion Royce Gracie in the first round at UFC 60.
- 2006 NBA Playoffs
  - Eastern Conference Final, Game 3
    - Miami Heat 98, Detroit Pistons 83 Miami leads series 2–1
- NHL 2006 Stanley Cup playoffs
  - Western Conference Final, Game 5
    - Edmonton Oilers 2, Mighty Ducks of Anaheim 1: Behind a 32-save performance by Dwayne Roloson and a 10-for-11 penalty-killing unit, the Oilers return to the Stanley Cup Finals for the first time since 1990, winning the series 4–1, and are the first 8th seeded team to play for the Cup since the current playoff format was adopted in 1994.
- American football
  - NFL Europe: Behind running back Butchie Wallace, who is named the game's most valuable player, the Frankfurt Galaxy defeat the Amsterdam Admirals, 22–7, to win World Bowl XIV.

== 26 May 2006 (Friday) ==
- 2006 NBA Playoffs
  - Western Conference Final, Game 2
    - Dallas Mavericks 105, Phoenix Suns 98 Series tied 1–1
- NHL 2006 Stanley Cup playoffs
  - Eastern Conference Final, Game 4
    - Carolina Hurricanes 4, Buffalo Sabres 0 Series tied, 2–2
- Cycling
  - Giro d'Italia: Juan Manuel Gárate wins the 19th stage of the Giro, a tough mountain stage over seven hours. Ivan Basso maintains his firm hold of the Maglia rosa.

== 25 May 2006 (Thursday) ==
- 2006 NBA Playoffs
  - Eastern Conference Final, Game 2
    - Detroit Pistons 92, Miami Heat 88 Series tied, 1–1
- NHL 2006 Stanley Cup playoffs
  - Western Conference Final, Game 4
    - Mighty Ducks of Anaheim 6, Edmonton Oilers 3 Edmonton leads series 3–1
- Cycling
  - Giro d'Italia: Stefan Schumacher wins his second stage of the Giro in a sprint finish between 5 breakaway riders. Ivan Basso maintains his firm lead in the provisional General Classement.

== 24 May 2006 (Wednesday) ==
- Rugby league State of Origin, Australia:
  - New South Wales 17, Queensland 16: In the series opener at Telstra Stadium, Sydney, New South Wales narrowly defeats Queensland 17–16. Despite holding a 14–0 half-time lead and being ahead 16–6 late in the second half, NSW had to hold off a late charge from the Maroons who managed to tie the game with a few minutes left in the game. Brett Finch who had been rushed into the side over injury concerns, kicked a successful drop goal with a minute left in regulation to win the game. Game 2 will be on Wednesday June 14 at Suncorp Stadium, Brisbane.(ABC, Australia)
- 2006 NBA Playoffs
  - Western Conference Final, Game 1
    - Phoenix Suns 121, Dallas Mavericks 118, Phoenix leads series 1–0
- NHL 2006 Stanley Cup playoffs
  - Eastern Conference Final, Game 3
    - Buffalo Sabres 4, Carolina Hurricanes 3 Buffalo leads series 2–1
- Football (soccer)
  - MLS: Lewis Wolff and the ownership group of the Oakland Athletics of Major League Baseball enter into a three-year exclusivity agreement permitting them to receive a new MLS franchise for the San Francisco Bay Area if they come up with a deal to build a soccer-specific stadium. (ESPN.com)
- Cycling
  - Giro d'Italia: Leonardo Piepoli wins his second mountain stage of the Giro. Ivan Basso again gains more time on his rivals in the contest for the Maglia rosa.

== 23 May 2006 (Tuesday) ==
- 2006 NBA Playoffs
  - Eastern Conference Final, Game 1
    - Miami Heat 91, Detroit Pistons 86 Miami leads series 1–0
- NBA draft lottery: The Toronto Raptors won the 2006 edition and will select first in the 2006 NBA draft on June 28.
- NHL 2006 Stanley Cup playoffs
  - Western Conference Final, Game 3
    - Edmonton Oilers 5, Mighty Ducks of Anaheim 4. Edmonton leads series 3–0.
- Cycling
  - Giro d'Italia: Ivan Basso wins his second stage of the Giro, again a mountaintop finish, and builds on his lead in the Maglia rosa.

== 22 May 2006 (Monday) ==
- 2006 NBA Playoffs
  - Western Conference Semi-Finals, Game 7
    - Dallas Mavericks 119 San Antonio Spurs 111 (OT): The Mavericks go to the Western Conference finals for the first time since the 1984–85 season and eliminate the defending champion Spurs in the process.
    - Phoenix Suns 127, Los Angeles Clippers 107: The Suns sank the Clippers thanks to fifteen three-point baskets, and will face the Mavs starting Wednesday (May 24) in Dallas.
- Thoroughbred racing: After six hours of surgery, Barbaro stands on his repaired right hindleg, making it more likely he will survive his injury at the 131st Preakness Stakes. His racing career over, if he recovers he will be retired to stud. (ESPN.com)
- NHL 2006 Stanley Cup playoffs
  - Eastern Conference Final, Game 2
    - Carolina Hurricanes 4, Buffalo Sabres 3 Series tied 1–1
- Cycling
  - Giro d'Italia: Paolo Bettini wins his first stage of the Giro. No change in the top of the provisional leaderboard as Ivan Basso remains in the Maglia rosa.

== 21 May 2006 (Sunday) ==
- 2006 NBA Playoffs
  - Eastern Conference Semi-Final, Game 7
    - Detroit Pistons 79, Cleveland Cavaliers 61: The Pistons stifled LeBron James en route to a rematch of their 2005 NBA Eastern Conference Final against the Miami Heat.
- NHL 2006 Stanley Cup playoffs
  - Western Conference Final, Game 2
    - Edmonton Oilers 3, Mighty Ducks of Anaheim 1. Edmonton leads series 2–0.
- Sweden wins the 2006 Men's World Ice Hockey Championships, defeating the Czech Republic in the final, 4:0.
- Football – Football League Championship Playoff Final
  - Leeds United 0–3 Watford: Aidy Boothroyd's first full season in charge of the Hornets, ended with an easy victory over Leeds in the play-off final. Goals from Jay DeMerit, Darius Henderson and an own goal by Leeds goalkeeper Neil Sullivan gave Watford a supposed £30 million windfall. BBC, ESPN Soccernet.
- Cycling
  - Giro d'Italia: Colombian Luis Laverde takes the stage victory as part of a long breakaway. There is no change to the top of the provisional leaderboard as Ivan Basso keeps a firm hold of the Maglia rosa.

== 20 May 2006 (Saturday) ==
- Major League Baseball: Barry Bonds ties Babe Ruth for second place on the all-time home run list with number 714 in the second inning of the San Francisco Giants–Oakland Athletics game. The Giants won the game 4–2.
- Auto racing
  - NASCAR: In an event that did not finish until the wee small hours of the morning because of rain, Jimmie Johnson won the NEXTEL All-Star Challenge in Concord, North Carolina. Earlier, Scott Riggs earned his way into the event by winning the NEXTEL Open, and fans voted Kyle Petty into the event via online, cellular and on-site balloting.
  - Indianapolis 500: Sam Hornish Jr. wins the pole for the 90th edition of the race, which was delayed one week due to inclement weather.
- Triple Crown of Thoroughbred Racing
  - Preakness Stakes in Baltimore, Maryland: Kentucky Derby winner Barbaro pulls up at the start of the Preakness and injures his leg, thus is unable to finish and so extends the Triple Crown drought to 28 years. Bernardini eventually wins the race.
- NHL 2006 Stanley Cup playoffs
  - Eastern Conference Final, Game 1
    - Buffalo Sabres 3, Carolina Hurricanes 2 Bufalo leads series 1–0
- Rugby union:
  - 2006 Super 14 Semi-Finals
    - Crusaders 35, Bulls 15: On the back of three second half tries, the Crusaders comfortably cruise to victory over the Bulls in the second semi-final and make their fifth successive Super Rugby final. The Crusaders will now have appeared in all but one of the past nine finals. The win also ensures an all New Zealand final next Saturday at Jade Stadium. XtraMSN NZ
  - Heineken Cup Final at Millennium Stadium, Cardiff
    - Biarritz 19 – 23 Munster: In their third attempt to win the final since 2000, Munster defeat the Basque team to take the Heineken Cup and become the European club champions. All but 1,500 of the 74,000 fans filling the Millennium Stadium were Irish supporters. (BBC)
- Cycling
  - Giro d'Italia: Italian Leonardo Piepoli wins a tough mountain stage after attacking provisional leader Ivan Basso on the final descent. Basso retains the Maglia rosa, and gains time on all his main rivals.
- Boxing
  - Marco Antonio Barrera defeats Rocky Juarez by split decision in a very competitive fight, with Juarez breaking Barrera's nose in the early rounds. The fight was originally announced as a draw until it was later revealed that there were two scorecard tabulation errors.

== 19 May 2006 (Friday) ==
- NHL 2006 Stanley Cup playoffs
  - Western Conference Final, Game 1
    - Edmonton Oilers 3, Mighty Ducks of Anaheim 1 Edmonton leads series 1–0
- Rugby union: 2006 Super 14 Semi-Finals
  - Hurricanes 16, Waratahs 14: After 3 semi-final losses the Hurricanes make their first final in Super rugby history in front of a sold out home crowd. A late penalty goal from Jimmy Gopperth gave the Hurricanes a narrow lead heading into the final moments of the game and were able to run out the clock. The Hurricanes will now await the winner of the other semi-final between the Crusaders and Bulls tomorrow night in Christchurch. TVNZ
- Cycling
  - Giro d'Italia: Spaniard Joan Horrach takes the stage as part of a long breakaway. Ivan Basso retains the provisional lead.

== 18 May 2006 (Thursday) ==
- Cycling:
  - Giro d'Italia: German time trial specialist Jan Ullrich takes the 50 km time trial. Maglia rosa Ivan Basso finishes second and grabs time on all his major rivals in the general classement.
- Cricket:
  - Indian captain Rahul Dravid's run-a-ball century leads India to a 5 wicket victory in the first ODI against the West Indies at Sabina Park, Jamaica.

== 17 May 2006 (Wednesday) ==
- NHL 2006 Stanley Cup playoffs
  - Edmonton Oilers 2, San Jose Sharks 0: The improbable run for the eighth-seeded Oilers continues as Dwayne Roloson shuts down the Sharks for the summer and earned a date in Southern California against the Mighty Ducks of Anaheim for their series opener Friday (May 19).
- Football: 2005–06 UEFA Champions League Final at Stade de France, Saint-Denis.
  - Barcelona 2–1 Arsenal Arsenal keeper Jens Lehmann got red carded in the 18th minute, the first time in UEFA finals history that a player was ejected, despite the reduction to ten men, they took the lead on a Sol Campbell header after a feee kick. The Gunners were holding on until two late Barcelona goals by Samuel Eto'o and Juliano Belletti to give the Catalans the Champions League trophy. (UEFA.com)

== 16 May 2006 (Tuesday) ==
- 2006 NBA Playoffs
  - Miami Heat 106, New Jersey Nets 105: Dwyane Wade's interception of a Vince Carter inbounds pass as time expires allows the Heat to escape a furious Nets comeback and advance to the Eastern Conference Finals for the second straight year. Next: The winner of the Pistons–Cavs series.
- Football: Former Senator Guido Rossi, 75, is appointed commissioner of the Italian Football Federation as investigations continue into alleged corruption in Serie A. Shares in Juventus are suspended for the second day running; Juventus – who won the Serie A title last Saturday – may be relegated as a result of the scandal, which may cost the club 120 million euro. Former Juventus director Luciano Moggi was interviewed by magistrates for five hours on Monday. On Tuesday magistrates are interviewing A.C. Milan coach Carlo Ancelotti, Internazionale coach Roberto Mancini, retired referee Pierluigi Collina, and A.C. Milan vice-president Adriano Galliani as "persons acquainted with the facts" i.e. witnesses. (Sporting Life), (OhmyNews)
- Cycling
  - Giro d'Italia: Italian climber Franco Pellizotti wins the 10th Stage in the Giro, and jumps into the top 5 of the provisional leaderboard. However Ivan Basso retains the Maglia rosa.

== 15 May 2006 (Monday) ==
- American football: Doug Flutie, winner of the 1984 Heisman Trophy at Boston College and a veteran of two decades in the USFL, CFL and NFL officially retired.
- Cricket: Sri Lankan cricket team in England in 2006:
  - First Test at Lord's, London: Match drawn. By stumps on Day 3, the game was firmly in England's control. The home side had compiled 551/6 declared courteousy of centuries to Kevin Pietersen (158) and Marcus Trescothick (106); in reply, Sri Lanka were dismissed for 192 in their first innings and forced to follow-on. In Sri Lanka's second innings, a century to Mahela Jayawardene (119) and half-centuries to six other batsmen allowed Sri Lanka to bat out the remaining time, the match ending prematurely on Day 5 when bad light called off play. (Scorecard)
- Cycling
  - Giro d'Italia: Lithuanian sprinter Tomas Vaitkus takes the 9th stage in a closely contested sprint finish. There is no change to the top of the provisional leaderboard as Ivan Basso retains the Maglia rosa
  - Volta a Catalunya: Swiss time trial specialist Fabian Cancellara wins the opening day time trial prologue and therefore leads the provisional standings.

== 14 May 2006 (Sunday) ==
- NHL 2006 Stanley Cup playoffs
  - Carolina Hurricanes 4, New Jersey Devils 1: Brian Gionta scored the first goal of the game, but it was all Carolina after that as they exorcised the Devils from the post season in five games. The Canes will open their Eastern Conference Final series against the Buffalo Sabres on Saturday (May 20) at the RBC Center in Raleigh at 2 PM US EDT.
- Auto racing
  - Formula One: Renault's reigning World Champion Fernando Alonso wins his home Grand Prix for the first time in his career, at the Spanish GP. The 130,000 crowd cheered on the 24-year-old from Oviedo, as he won the 66-lap race easily, winning by 18.5 seconds from Ferrari's Michael Schumacher and by almost 24 seconds to his Renault teammate Giancarlo Fisichella. Alonso now opens up a commanding 15 point championship lead, before the next round – the Monaco Grand Prix on May 28.
- Major League Baseball: In celebration of Mother's Day in the US and Canada, the Office of the Commissioner approved use of special pink bats in all games that were played today. Monies raised from the auctioning of these bats, as well as line-up cards and special bases used in the games, along with strikeouts by pitchers since last Sunday (May 7) will go to charities for breast cancer research.
- Football: FC Shakhtar Donetsk beat FC Dynamo Kyiv 2:1 to win the Ukrainian Premier League championship. This match was an extra match labeled the "Golden Match" because the regular season ended in a tie between the two first placed teams. Both teams had 75 points in 30 games and to determine the champion an extra game was played.
- Cycling
  - Giro d'Italia: Ivan Basso wins a mountaintop finish by a wide margin and takes over the provisional lead.
- Rugby union: Sale Sharks beat defending champions London Wasps 22 – 12 and Leicester Tigers beats London Irish 40 – 8 and will meet in the Guinness Premiership final.

== 13 May 2006 (Saturday) ==
- College Basketball: Southern California freshman point guard Ryan Francis, 19, is shot and killed in Baton Rouge, Louisiana while visiting his mother. One man is arrested and charged with murder. (Yahoo)
- NHL 2006 Stanley Cup playoffs
  - Buffalo Sabres 3, Ottawa Senators 2 (OT): Jason Pominville scores a short-handed goal 2:26 into overtime to eliminate the top-seeded Senators. The Sabres will now await the winner of the Carolina–New Jersey series.
- Auto racing
  - NASCAR NEXTEL Cup: In a fast and furious finish, Greg Biffle defends his 2005 victory in the Dodge Charger 500 by two carlengths over Jeff Gordon.
- Football:
  - FA Cup Final: Liverpool 3 – 3 West Ham United Liverpool win 3–1 on penalties: In the best FA Cup Final for decades, compared by commentators to the classic "Matthews Final" of 1953, for the second year running the FA Cup Final goes to extra time and a penalty shoot-out. West Ham take a 2-goal lead in the first half, through an own goal from Jamie Carragher and Dean Ashton before Djibril Cissé brings it back to 2–1 at half time. Steven Gerrard scores the equaliser in the 53rd minute, then defender Paul Konchesky puts West Ham back in the lead ten minutes later, with a cross-come-shot. But in the 91st minute, Gerrard scores a sensational goal, a well-hit 35-yard drive, worthy of levelling any football match. Extra time produced no goals, so it was onto penalties, and Liverpool's Pepe Reina is the hero, saving 3 of West Ham's 4 penalties from Bobby Zamora, Konchesky and Anton Ferdinand, to give Liverpool their 7th FA Cup, and their first since 2001.
  - Scottish Cup Final: Heart of Midlothian 1 – 1 Gretna Hearts win 4–2 on penalties: Third-tier Gretna's fairy tale story comes to an end at last, but not before they give SPL side Hearts a scare by taking the match to extra time and a penalty shoot-out. Rudi Skácel gave Hearts a 1–0 lead in the 39th minute, and they held that lead until the 76th minute. Deividas Česnauskis gave away a penalty when he tackled John O'Neil in the penalty area. Ryan McGuffie took the penalty, but was expertly saved by goalkeeper Craig Gordon, but he couldn't hold onto it, and McGuffie scored the rebound. Then in the last minute of extra time, Paul Hartley kicked out at Gretna defender Derek Townsley which earned him a 2nd yellow and he had to watch the shootout from the sidelines. Hearts scored all 4 of their penalties from Steven Pressley, Robbie Neilson, Skácel and Michal Pospíšil, while Gretna only scored 2 with 2 misses (Gavin Skelton – hit the bar & Townsley – saved by Gordon). Hearts win the Scottish Cup for the seventh time, and is their first since 1998.
- Rugby union: 2006 Super 14 season
  - Hurricanes 19, Waratahs 14: The Hurricanes hold on to beat the Waratahs in Sydney and will host their first home semi-final in Super rugby history. They will meet the Waratahs next week in Wellington. TVNZ
  - Bulls 43, Stormers 10: The Bulls clinch the fourth and final semi-final spot in the Super 14 after defeating the Stormers in Cape Town. The 33 point winning margin was enough to overtake the Sharks in the standings on point difference by 1 point. The Bulls will now travel to Christchurch to face the defending champion Crusaders.TVNZ
- Cycling
  - Giro d'Italia: Rik Verbrugghe wins the stage in a solo breakaway. Serhiy Honchar regains the provisional lead in the Giro.

== 11 May 2006 (Thursday) ==
- NHL 2006 Stanley Cup playoffs
  - Mighty Ducks of Anaheim 4, Colorado Avalanche 1: The Ducks advance to their second Western Conference final in three NHL seasons by sweeping the Avalanche in Denver thanks to two Todd Marchant goals. Now they will await the winner of the San José–Edmonton series.
- Football: The entire board of Juventus resigns only days before the club is expected to win its second successive Serie A championship. There have been days of embarrassing press revelations of collusion in the appointment of referees to Juventus matches. The club's share price falls 10% as prosecutors in Rome, Turin, and Naples investigate referee malpractice and several Serie A clubs. (BBC) (Guardian)
- Cycling
  - Giro d'Italia: In a Team time trial the Danish Team CSC wins by one second over the German T-Mobile Team. Ukrainian veteran Serhiy Honchar takes the provisional overall lead.

== 10 May 2006 (Wednesday) ==
- Football: 2005–06 UEFA Cup Final, at Eindhoven.
  - Middlesbrough 0–4 Sevilla: Enzo Maresca scored two second half goals and Sevilla wraps up their first major European championship, and give a sad sendoff to Steve McClaren's new job as English manager. (UEFA.com)

== 9 May 2006 (Tuesday) ==
- Cycling
  - Giro d'Italia: Australian sprinter Robbie McEwen wins a bunch sprint to take his second stage of the Giro. Stefan Schumacher retains the overall provisional lead.

== 8 May 2006 (Monday) ==
- Football (soccer)
  - The Supreme Leader of Iran, Ayatollah Ali Khamenei, overrules President Mahmoud Ahmadinejad's decision in April to permit women to attend football matches, upholding the 27-year-old ban on women attending the games. (ESPN SoccerNet)
- Cycling
  - Giro d'Italia: Young German Stefan Schumacher wins the 3rd stage in terrible weather conditions, and also takes the overall Leader's Jersey.

== 7 May 2006 (Sunday) ==
- Cricket: New Zealand in South Africa
  - Third Test at Wanderers Stadium, Johannesburg: South Africa defeats New Zealand by 4 wickets to win the three-Test series, 2–0.
    - The Test began disastrously for New Zealand, sent into bat by South Africa, with the first three wickets falling with only two runs on the board. The visitors were dismissed for 119 shortly after lunch on Day 1. Makhaya Ntini's bowling figures of 5/35 was the fourteenth time the fast bowler claimed a five-wicket haul in Test cricket. South Africa's reply of 186 was centred on a partnership of 98 runs between Graeme Smith and Hashim Amla. Trailing by 67 runs at the turn of the innings, New Zealand lost early wickets in its second innings before finishing with 283. South Africa overhauled the total with four wickets to spare, the match finishing within three of the designated five days. (Scorecard)
- Football:
  - England: After 93 years and 2,010 matches played, Arsenal closed out Highbury with a Thierry Henry hat trick and an emotional 4–2 victory over Wigan Athletic, jumping them into fourth place (and the last UEFA Champions League spot) in the FA Premier League as Tottenham Hotspur lost to West Ham United, 2–1, as many of the Spurs' players were hampered by food poisoning. This now means that the Romanian champions will now not need to qualify for the Champions League, as Romania, currently 10th in the UEFA coefficients list, would have lost their automatic spot had Arsenal finished 5th and won the Champions League.
  - Scotland: Celtic signed off their dominant campaign with a stuttering 2–2 draw with Aberdeen at Pittodrie. John Hartson and Shaun Maloney gave Celtic a 2–0 lead, before a brace from John Stewart gave his side a point. Meanwhile, second-place Heart of Midlothian lost, 2–0, at third-place Rangers, in Rangers manager Alex McLeish's 235th and last game in charge. Kris Boyd scored his 36th and 37th goals of the season, to move Rangers to within a point of Hearts, and today's other game saw Kilmarnock move up to fifth place after a 3–1 win over nine-man Hibernian. Steven Fletcher gave Hibs a half-time lead before they fell apart in the second half. Firstly, David Murphy was sent off, for deliberate handball, and Steven Naismith converted the penalty. Gordon Greer and Colin Nish also scored in four minutes (72' & 75') to put the game beyond doubt, and to make the Hibs' day even worse, goalkeeper Zbigniew Małkowski was also sent off for two yellow cards.
- Horse racing:
  - Great Britain: 10/1 shot Speciosa won the 1,000 Guineas at Newmarket, giving a first win in the race for jockey Michael Fenton and trainer Pam Sly. Speciosa's time of 1:40.53, was the slowest time for a winning horse this century and was the slowest since Musical Bliss in 1989.
- Auto racing:
  - Formula One: Michael Schumacher won the European Grand Prix at the Nürburgring, to clinch the 86th victory of his career. Championship leader and reigning World Champion Fernando Alonso finished just 3.7 seconds behind the German, with Schumacher's teammate Felipe Massa, earning his first podium spot with third place. The next race is the Spanish Grand Prix on May 14.
- Cycling:
  - Giro d'Italia: Robbie McEwen won the second stage of the Giro, winning a sprint finish in Charleroi. Paolo Savoldelli still led the race, points standings, King of the Mountains standings and Intergiro standings.

== 6 May 2006 (Saturday) ==
- 2006 NBA Playoffs
  - Game 7, Western Conference Quarter Finals: Phoenix Suns 121, Los Angeles Lakers 90
    - The Phoenix Suns become only the eighth team in NBA history to overcome a 3–1 deficit to defeat the Lakers and advance to the Western Conference semi-finals. The Suns will now face the Los Angeles Clippers starting Monday (May 8). ESPN .
- Auto racing:
  - NASCAR NEXTEL Cup: Dale Earnhardt Jr. wins the Crown Royal 400 at Richmond International Raceway.
- Horse racing:
  - Triple Crown of Thoroughbred Racing
    - United States: Barbaro wins the 132nd running of the Kentucky Derby, the first win in the "Run for the Roses" for jockey Edgar Prado.
    - United Kingdom: George Washington wins the 2,000 Guineas, in the second consecutive triumph in this race for both jockey Kieren Fallon and trainer Aidan O'Brien.
- Cycling — 2006 Giro d'Italia:
  - Paolo Savoldelli wins the opening day prologue and is currently the provisional leader of the general classement.
- Football (soccer):
  - German Bundesliga: Bayern Munich become the first club in German history to successfully defend a league-cup double. Bayern, already winners of the German Cup, draw 1–1 at Kaiserslautern, but clinch the Bundesliga crown when their closest chasers, Hamburg, lose 4–2 at Hertha BSC.
- Boxing
  - Oscar De La Hoya returns from a 20-month break and defeats Ricardo Mayorga for the WBC super welterweight title

== 5 May 2006 (Friday) ==
- 2006 NBA Playoffs
  - San Antonio Spurs 105, Sacramento Kings 83: The Spurs ended the Kings' season, and now face Dallas in the conference semi-finals beginning Sunday.
  - Cleveland Cavaliers 114, Washington Wizards 113 (OT): The Cavs will play Detroit in the Conference semi-finals beginning on Sunday (May 7).
- Rugby league: ANZAC Test
  - Australia def. New Zealand 50–12 at Suncorp Stadium, Brisbane. (National Nine News)

== 4 May 2006 (Thursday) ==
- 2006 NBA Playoffs
  - New Jersey Nets 96, Indiana Pacers 90: While the Pacers' Anthony Johnson put 40 points on the board, it wasn't enough as the Nets finish off their series in six games.
  - Miami Heat 113, Chicago Bulls 96: Shaquille O'Neal had 30 points and 23 rebounds, and Dwyane Wade added 23 for Miami to end their-six game series and will now meet the Nets beginning on Monday (May 8).
- Football: Steve McClaren, after his success as leader of Middlesbrough into the 2005–06 UEFA Cup Final, will take over as the manager of the English national team following the 2006 World Cup.

== 3 May 2006 (Wednesday) ==
- NHL 2006 Stanley Cup playoffs
  - Game 7 Western Conference Quarter Final: Mighty Ducks of Anaheim 3, Calgary Flames 0. Teemu Selanne scored what was the series-winning goal as the Ducks will face Colorado in the Western Conference semi-finals, and the San Jose Sharks will meet Edmonton. The top four seeds in the West have all been eliminated, the first time since the adoption of this format.
- 2006 NBA playoffs
  - Detroit Pistons 122, Milwaukee Bucks 93: Rip Hamilton tore off 40 points and the Bucks were eliminated by the Pistons in five games. Detroit now awaits the winner of the Cavaliers–Wizards series.

== 2 May 2006 (Tuesday) ==
- Football (soccer)
  - Ukrainian Cup Finals: FC Dynamo Kyiv beat FC Metalurh Zaporizhzhya 1–0 to win the Ukrainian Cup for the second consecutive year.
- NHL 2006 Stanley Cup playoffs
  - Carolina Hurricanes 2, Montreal Canadiens 1 (OT): It takes Cory Stillman just 79 seconds to score the series-winning goal in overtime and advance the Canes to an Eastern Conference semi-final date with the New Jersey Devils.
  - Buffalo Sabres 7, Philadelphia Flyers 1: Team captain Chris Drury scores the last two goals after the Sabres scored five straight times against Robert Esche and leads the Sabres to the conference semi-finals against the Ottawa Senators.

== 1 May 2006 (Monday) ==
- 2006 NBA Playoffs
  - Dallas Mavericks 102, Memphis Grizzlies 76: For the third straight appearance since moving from Vancouver in 2001, the Griz get swept out of the playoffs, and have not won a playoff game in 12 attempts, a new NBA postseason futility record. The Mavs will now await the winner of the San Antonio–Sacramento series.
  - Los Angeles Clippers 101, Denver Nuggets 83: After three decades, three cities and four arenas, the Clippers won a playoff series, eliminating the Northwest Division champions in five games. Next, the winner of the Phoenix–Lakers series.
- NHL 2006 Stanley Cup playoffs
  - Edmonton Oilers 4, Detroit Red Wings 3: The Wings were twenty minutes away from sending the series back to Detroit for a seventh game, but the Oilers score four unanswered goals capped by Ales Hemsky's game winner with 1:06 left in regulation and eliminate the Presidents' Trophy (regular season) champions. Next up, either their Alberta rivals, the Calgary Flames or the San Jose Sharks.
- Auto racing: Jimmie Johnson goes two-for-two on restrictor plate races by winning the NASCAR NEXTEL Cup Aaron's 499 in Talladega, Alabama, which was postponed from April 30 due to rain.
- Cricket: New Zealand in South Africa
  - Second Test at Newlands, Cape Town: The Second Test ends in a draw. South Africa leads three-Test series 1–0.
    - In a high scoring match, New Zealand compiled 593/8 declared, the innings centred on a record eighth-wicket partnership of 256 between captain Stephen Fleming (262) and tail-ender James Franklin (122 not out). In reply, South Africa were dismissed for 512, Hashim Amla (149) and Ashwell Prince (108 not out) scoring centuries. With only two-and-a-half hours of play remaining on the final day, New Zealand reached 121/3 by stumps. (Scorecard)
