= March 2006 in sports =

<<	March 2006					>>
Su	Mo	Tu	We	Th	Fr	Sa
			1	2	3	4
5	6	7	8	9	10	11
12	13	14	15	16	17	18
19	20	21	22	23	24	25
26	27	28	29	30	31
India; Sports

This list shows notable sports-related deaths, events, and notable outcomes that occurred in March of 2006.

== Deaths ==
- 30: Red Hickey
- 26: Paul Dana
- 17: Ray Meyer
- 15: Red Storey
- 13: Roy Clarke
- 13: Jimmy Johnstone
- 11: Bernie Geoffrion
- 6: Kirby Puckett
- 1: Peter Osgood

== Sporting seasons ==
- Auto racing 2006:
  - Formula One; GP2; BTCC
  - Indy Racing League
  - NASCAR; Busch; Craftsman Truck
  - World Rally Championship
- Cricket 2005–06: Australia; West Indies
- Association football 2006:
  - England: Premier League; England (general)
  - Scotland
  - Denmark: Superliga
  - France: Ligue 1;
  - UEFA Champions League;
    UEFA Cup
  - Argentina
- Rugby union 2005–06:
  - Heineken Cup, Super 14
- U.S. and Canadian sports 2005–06:
  - NHL; NBA

== March 30, 2006 (Thursday) ==
- Cricket: Pakistani cricket team in Sri Lanka in 2005–06
  - First Test at Colombo SSC: Sri Lanka 185 (Dilshan 69) and 448/5 dec. (Sangakkara 185, Jayawardene 85, Tharanga 72) drew with Pakistan 176 (Imran Farhat 69) and 337/4 (Shoaib Malik 148). Two-Test series tied 0–0; the Second Test begins Monday in Kandy. First Test scorecard
- Football: 2005–06 UEFA Cup – Quarter finals, first leg.
  - Sevilla 4–1 Zenit St. Petersburg
  - Levski Sofia 1–3 Schalke 04
    - Schalke score 3 in the second half to recover against 10-man Levski.
  - Rapid Bucharest 1–1 Steaua Bucharest
    - The first half of the Romanian capital's Derby ends in a draw.
  - FC Basel 2–0 Middlesbrough (UEFA.com)

== March 29, 2006 (Wednesday) ==
- Cricket – West Indian cricket team in New Zealand in 2005–06:
  - Third Test: The Third and final Test between New Zealand and West Indies at Napier ends in a draw. Only 79 overs were possible on the first two days before rain washed out the match. New Zealand won the three-Test series 2–0. 3rd Test scorecard
- Football: 2005–06 UEFA Champions League – Quarter finals, first leg.
  - Internazionale 2–1 Villarreal
  - Lyon 0–0 A.C. Milan (UEFA.com)

== March 28, 2006 (Tuesday) ==
- Cricket:
  - Australian cricket team in South Africa in 2005–06
    - Second Test: Australia defeats South Africa in Durban to win the three-Test series after its victory the week before in Cape Town. The Third Test commences in Johannesburg on Friday.
      - Score: Australia 369 (Ponting 103, Hussey 75) and 307/4 dec. (Ponting 116, Hayden 102) defeated South Africa 267 (Kallis 114, Lee 5/69) and 297 (Warne 6/86) by 112 runs. Australia leads three-Test series 2–0. Scorecard
  - 2005–06 Australian cricket season
    - Queensland defeats Victoria by an innings and 354 runs to secure the Pura Cup. Queensland scored 6/900 declared – the eleventh highest score in first-class cricket – to win Australia's domestic four-day cricket competition. Queensland's innings included two double centuries (Maher 223, Watson 201 retired) and two centuries (Perren 173, Love 169). Complete scorecard.
- Football: 2005–06 UEFA Champions League – Quarter finals, first leg.
  - Benfica 0–0 Barcelona
  - Arsenal 2–0 Juventus (UEFA.com)
- 2006 NCAA Division I Women's Basketball Tournament, Regional Finals
  - Cleveland Region: (1) North Carolina 75, (2) Tennessee 63
  - Bridgeport Region: (1) Duke 63, (2) UConn 61 (OT)

== March 27, 2006 (Monday) ==
- 2006 NCAA Division I Women's Basketball Tournament, Regional Finals
  - Albuquerque Region: (2) Maryland 75, (5) Utah 65 (OT)
  - San Antonio Region: (1) LSU 62, (3) Stanford 59

== March 26, 2006 (Sunday) ==
- Auto racing
  - Paul Dana, 30, is killed in an accident with fellow driver Ed Carpenter during the practice session for the Toyota Indy 300 at Homestead-Miami Speedway. Team owner Bobby Rahal pulled the other two cars he had entered – driven by Danica Patrick and Buddy Rice — after learning of Dana's death. The race went off as scheduled, with defending series champion Dan Wheldon narrowly defeating Hélio Castroneves to win the race.
  - NASCAR NEXTEL Cup: Kurt Busch drives the Miller Lite No. 2 Dodge Charger to his first win with Penske Motorsports in the Food City 500 at Bristol Motor Speedway.
- 2006 NCAA Division I Women's Basketball Tournament, Regional semi-finals
  - Cleveland Region
    - (2) Tennessee 76, (3) Rutgers 69
    - (1) North Carolina 70, (4) Purdue 68
  - Bridgeport Region
    - (1) Duke 86, (4) Michigan State61
    - (2) UConn 77, (3) Georgia 75
- 2006 NCAA Division I Men's Basketball Tournament, Regional finals
  - Washington, D.C. Region: (11) George Mason 86, (1) UConn 84 (OT). The Patriots become the first mid-major school to make the Final Four since 1979, when both Penn and a Larry Bird-led Indiana State made it.
  - Minneapolis Region: (3) Florida 75, (1) Villanova 62. For the first time since the 1980 Final Four, and the second time since the tournament was seeded beginning in 1979, no No. 1 seeded teams made the Final Four.
- Cricket: Brett Lee becomes the 12th Australian to take 200 wickets in Test cricket. ABC Sport (Australia)
- Golf: Canadian Stephen Ames takes the 2006 Players Championship with a score of 14 under par, six strokes ahead of second-place Retief Goosen of South Africa. Ames will receive $1.44 million, 10 years' exemption for PGA Tour events and an invitation to the four major championships as a reward. In 2007, the event will move to May (May 10 – 13) in the month between The Masters and the U.S. Open. (ESPN)
- Ice hockey
  - The Alberta Golden Bears win their record 12th University Cup 3–2 over the Lakehead Thunderwolves. (TSN)
  - Wisconsin defeats Minnesota 3–0 to win the NCAA Women's Ice Hockey Championship on the Gophers' home ice.

== March 25, 2006 (Saturday) ==
- Figure skating: American teenager Kimmie Meissner outskates the favorites (including fellow American Sasha Cohen) and wins the ISU World Figure Skating Ladies' Championship in Calgary, Alberta.
- Association football
  - English Football League Championship – Reading F.C. earn promotion to the English Premier League
- 2006 NCAA Division I Women's Basketball Tournament, Regional semi-finals
  - San Antonio Region
    - (1) LSU 66, (4) DePaul 56
    - (3) Stanford 88, (2) Oklahoma 74
  - Albuquerque Region
    - (2) Maryland 82, (3) Baylor 63
    - (5) Utah 57, (8) Boston College 54
- 2006 NCAA Division I Men's Basketball Tournament, Regional finals
  - Atlanta Region: (4) LSU 70, (2) Texas 60 (OT)
  - Oakland Region: (2) UCLA 50, (1) Memphis 45

== March 24, 2006 (Friday) ==
- 2006 NCAA Division I Men's Basketball Tournament, Regional semi-finals
  - Minneapolis Region
    - (1) Villanova 60, (4) Boston College 59 (OT)
    - (3) Florida 57, (7) Georgetown 53
  - Washington, D.C. Regional
    - (11) George Mason 63, (7) Wichita State 55
    - (1) UConn 98, (5) Washington 92 (OT)

== March 23, 2006 (Thursday) ==
- 2006 NCAA Division I Men's Basketball Tournament, Regional semi-finals
  - Atlanta Region
    - (4) LSU 62, (1) Duke 54
    - (2) Texas 74, (6) West Virginia 71
  - Oakland Region
    - (1) Memphis 80, (13) Bradley 64
    - (2) UCLA 73, (3) Gonzaga 71

== March 22, 2006 (Wednesday) ==
- Cricket:
  - England in India 2006:
    - Third Test at Mumbai:England 400 (Andrew Strauss 128, Shanthakumaran Sreesanth 4/70) and 191 (Andrew Flintoff 50, Anil Kumble 4/49) beat India 279 (Mahendra Singh Dhoni 64, James Anderson 4/40) and 100 (Shaun Udal 4/14) by 212 runs. The three match series is drawn 1–1. Flintoff, England's stand-in captain, is named Man of the Match and Man of the Series.

== March 21, 2006 (Tuesday) ==
- NFL
  - In a three-way trade, the New York Jets traded DE John Abraham to the Atlanta Falcons for the 29th overall pick in the first round of the 2006 NFL draft, which was acquired from the Denver Broncos for the 15th overall pick that same round.
  - Adam Vinatieri signed with the Indianapolis Colts. The former New England Patriots kicker, who won Super Bowl XXXVI and XXXVIII with last-second field goals will replace Mike Vanderjagt.
- 2006 NCAA Division I Women's Basketball Tournament, Second round
  - Bridgeport Region
    - At Trenton, New Jersey:
      - (3) Georgia 73, (11) Hartford 54
    - At Norfolk, Virginia:
      - (1) Duke 85, (8) Southern California 51
    - At University Park, Pennsylvania:
      - (2) UConn 79, (7) Virginia Tech 56
  - Cleveland Region
    - At Norfolk:
      - (2) Tennessee 66, (7) George Washington 53
    - At Trenton:
      - (3) Rutgers 82, (11) TCU 48
    - At West Lafayette, Indiana:
      - (4) Purdue 61, (5) UCLA 54
  - Albuquerque Region
    - At West Lafayette:
      - (8) Boston College 79, (1) Ohio State 69
    - At University Park:
      - (2) Maryland 81, (7) St. John's 74

== March 20, 2006 (Monday) ==
- World Baseball Classic: Japan beats Cuba 10–6, to win the first World Baseball Classic at Petco Park in San Diego. Pitcher Daisuke Matsuzaka was named Most Valuable Player.
- Cricket:
  - West Indian cricket team in New Zealand in 2005–06:
    - Second Test at Wellington: West Indies 192 (Morton 63, Franklin 5/53) and 215 (Gayle 68) lose to New Zealand 372 (Fleming 97, Fulton 75, Astle 65, Edwards 5/65) and 36/0 by ten wickets. New Zealand leads three-Test series 2–0. Cricinfo scorecard
- American football: Paul Tagliabue, who has served as the commissioner of the NFL since 1987, will retire in July.
- Auto racing: Pole sitter Kasey Kahne won the rain-delayed NASCAR NEXTEL Cup Golden Corral 500. Bill Lester, the first African-American to qualify for a top level NASCAR race since Willy T. Ribbs two decades earlier, finished in 38th place, three laps behind.
- 2006 NCAA Division I Women's Basketball Tournament, Second round
  - Bridgeport Region
    - At Rosemont, Illinois:
      - (4) Michigan State 67, (5) Kentucky 63
  - Cleveland Region
    - At Nashville:
      - (1) North Carolina 89, (8) Vanderbilt 70
  - San Antonio Region
    - At Denver:
      - (2) Oklahoma 86, (7) BYU 70
      - (3) Stanford 86, (6) Florida State 70
    - At Nashville
      - (1) LSU 72, (8) Washington 49
    - At Rosemont:
      - (4) DePaul 71, (12) Tulsa 67
  - Albuquerque Region
    - At Tucson, Arizona:
      - (3) Baylor 87, (11) New Mexico 67
      - (5) Utah 86, (4) Arizona State 65

== March 19, 2006 (Sunday) ==
- The 2006 Winter Paralympics in Turin, Italy, conclude with Russia leading all countries with 33 total medals.
- Auto racing
  - NASCAR: The NEXTEL Cup Golden Corral 500 was postponed due to rain and will be raced Monday at 11 am US EST (1600 UTC).
  - Formula One: Giancarlo Fisichella of Italy won the Malaysian Grand Prix.
- 2006 NCAA Division I Women's Basketball Tournament, First round
  - Bridgeport Region
    - At Trenton, New Jersey:
      - (11) Hartford 64, (6) Temple 58
      - (3) Georgia 75, (14) Marist 60
    - At Norfolk, Virginia:
      - (1) Duke 96, (16) Southern 27: The Jaguars set an all-time record low score for an NCAA Women's Tournament game.
      - (8) Southern California 67, (9) South Florida 65
    - At University Park, Pennsylvania:
      - (7) Virginia Tech 82, (10) Missouri 57
      - (2) UConn 77, (15) Coppin State 54
  - Cleveland Region
    - At Norfolk:
      - (2) Tennessee 102, (15) Army 54: The Lady Vols' Candace Parker dunked twice in this game, the first time in NCAA Women's Championship history that has happened.
      - (7) George Washington 87, (10) Old Domintion 72
    - At West Lafayette, Indiana:
      - (4) Purdue 73, (13) Missouri State 52
      - (5) UCLA 74, (12) Bowling Green 61
    - At Trenton:
      - (3) Rutgers 63, (14) Dartmouth 58
      - (11) TCU 68, (6) Texas A&M 65
  - Albuquerque Region
    - At University Park:
      - (7) St. John's 78, (10) Cal 68
      - (2) Maryland 95, (15) Sacred Heart 54
    - At West Lafayette:
      - (8) Boston College 78, (9) Notre Dame 61
      - (1) Ohio State 68, (16) Oakland (MI) 45
- 2006 NCAA Division I Men's Basketball Tournament, Second round
  - Oakland Region
    - At Auburn Hills, Michigan:
      - (13) Bradley 72, (5) Pitt 66
    - At Dallas:
      - (1) Memphis 72, (9) Bucknell 56
  - Atlanta Region
    - At Auburn Hills:
      - (6) West Virginia 67, (14) Northwestern State 54
    - At Dallas:
      - (2) Texas 75, (10) NC State 54
  - Washington, D.C. Region
    - At Dayton, Ohio:
      - (11) George Mason 65, (3) North Carolina 60
    - At Philadelphia:
      - (1) UConn 87, (8) Kentucky 83
  - Minneapolis Region
    - At Dayton:
      - (7) Georgetown 70, (2) Ohio State 52
    - At Philadelphia:
      - (1) Villanova 82, (8) Arizona 78.

== March 18, 2006 (Saturday) ==
- Cricket:
  - Australian cricket team in South Africa in 2005–06:
    - First Test at Newlands, Cape Town – South Africa 205 (Clark 5/55) and 197 (Clark 4/34) loses to Australia 308 (Hayden 94, Ponting 74, Symonds 55) and 95/3 (Ntini 3/28) by seven wickets. Australia leads three-Test series 1–0. Scorecard
- World Baseball Classic Semi Finals
  - Cuba 3, Dominican Republic 1
  - Japan 6, South Korea 0
- Rugby union: 2006 Six Nations Championship
  - Italy 10 – 13 Scotland
  - Wales 16 – 21 France
  - England 24 – 28 Ireland
  - France win their third Six Nations title in five years, but had to struggle to overcome Wales; they then had to wait for the England-Ireland match to take place to confirm their championship – Ireland could have taken the title if they'd beaten England by 34 clear points. Ireland settle for the Triple Crown, defeating England with a last-minute try.
- 2006 NCAA Division I Women's Basketball Tournament, First round
  - Bridgeport Region
    - At Rosemont, Illinois:
      - (4) Michigan State 65, (13) Milwaukee 46
      - (5) Kentucky 69, (12) Chattanooga 59
  - San Antonio Region
    - At Nashville:
      - (9) Washington 73, (8) Minnesota 69
      - (1) LSU 72, (16) Florida Atlantic 48
    - At Rosemont:
      - (4) DePaul 68, (13) Liberty 43
      - (12) Tulsa 71, (5) NC State 61
    - At Denver:
      - (2) Oklahoma 78, (15) Pepperdine 66
      - (7) BYU 67, (10) Iowa 62
      - (6) Florida State 80, (11) Louisiana Tech 71
      - (3) Stanford 72, (14) Southeast Missouri State 45
  - Cleveland Region
    - At Nashville:
      - (1) North Carolina 75, (16) UC Riverside 51
      - (8) Vanderbilt 76, (9) Louisville 69
  - Albuquerque Region
    - At Tucson, Arizona:
      - (5) Utah 76, (12) Middle Tennessee 71
      - (4) Arizona State 80, (13) Stephen F. Austin 61
      - (3) Baylor 74, (14) Northern Arizona 56
      - (11) New Mexico 83, (6) Florida 59
- 2006 NCAA Division I Men's Basketball Tournament, Second round:
  - Atlanta Region
    - At Greensboro, North Carolina:
      - (1) Duke 74, (8) George Washington 61
    - At Jacksonville, Florida:
      - (4) LSU 58, (12) Texas A&M 57
  - Minneapolis Region
    - At Jacksonville:
      - (3) Florida 82, (11) Milwaukee 60
    - At Salt Lake City:
      - (4) Boston College 69, (12) Montana 56
  - Washington, D.C. Region
    - At Greensboro:
      - (7) Wichita State 80, (2) Tennessee 73
    - At San Diego:
      - (5) Washington 67, (4) Illinois 64
  - Oakland Region
    - At San Diego:
      - (10) Alabama vs. (2) UCLA,
    - At Salt Lake City:
      - (3) Gonzaga 90, (6) Indiana 80
- Boxing: Hasim Rahman and James Toney battle to a twelve-round draw (tie) in a fight for the WBC's Heavyweight title.

== March 17, 2006 (Friday) ==
- Commonwealth Games Rugby Sevens
  - Final: New Zealand beat England 29–21
  - Bronze medal playoff: Fiji beat Australia 24–17
- 2006 NCAA Division I Men's Basketball Tournament, First round:
  - Minneapolis Region
    - At Dayton, Ohio:
      - (2) Ohio State 70, (15) Davidson 62
      - (7) Georgetown 54, (10) Northern Iowa 49
    - At Philadelphia:
      - (9) Arizona 94 (8) Wisconsin 75
      - (1) Villanova 58, (16) Monmouth 45
  - Atlanta Region
    - At Auburn Hills, Michigan:
      - (14) Northwestern State 64, (3) Iowa 63
      - (6) West Virginia 64, (11) Southern Illinois 46
    - At Dallas:
      - (10) NC State 57, (7) Cal 52
      - (2) Texas 60, (15) Penn 52
  - Oakland Region
    - At Dallas:
      - (9) Bucknell 59, (8) Arkansas 55
      - (1) Memphis 94, (16) Oral Roberts 78
    - At Auburn Hills:
      - (5) Pitt 79, (12) Kent State 64
      - (13) Bradley 76, (4) Kansas 73
  - Washington, D.C. Region
    - At Dayton:
      - (11) George Mason 75 (6) Michigan State 65
      - (3) North Carolina 69, (14) Murray State 65
    - At Philadelphia:
      - (1) UConn 72, (16) Albany 59
      - (8) Kentucky 69, (9) UAB 64

== March 16, 2006 (Thursday) ==
- Football: 2005–06 UEFA Cup – Round of 16, second leg, progressing teams shown in **bold**.
  - Strasbourg 2–2 **FC Basel**
  - Real Betis 0–3 **Steaua Bucharest**
  - **Schalke 04** 3–0 Palermo
  - **Zenit St. Petersburg** 1–1 Marseille
  - **Levski Sofia** 2–1 Udinese (UEFA.com)
- World Baseball Classic, Second round
  - Pool 1:
    - Mexico defeats USA, 2–1.
  - Japan advances to the semifinals on a tiebreaker with the USA and Mexico.
- 2006 NCAA Division I Men's Basketball Tournament, First round:
  - Washington, D.C. Region
    - At Greensboro, North Carolina:
      - (7) Wichita State 86, (10) Seton Hall 66
      - (2) Tennessee 63, (15) Winthrop 61
    - At San Diego:
      - (4) Illinois 78, (13) Air Force 69
      - (5) Washington 75, (12) Utah State 61
  - Minneapolis Region
    - At Jacksonville, Florida:
      - (11) Milwaukee 82, (6) Oklahoma 74
      - (3) Florida 76, (14) South Alabama 50
    - At Salt Lake City:
      - (4) Boston College 88, (13) Pacific 76 (2 OT)
      - (12) Montana 87, (5) Nevada 79
  - Atlanta Region
    - At Greensboro:
      - (8) George Washington 88, (9) UNC-Wilmington 85 (OT)
      - (1) Duke 70, (16) Southern 54
    - At Jacksonville:
      - (4) LSU 80, (13) Iona 64
      - (12) Texas A&M 66, (5) Syracuse 58
  - Oakland Region
    - At San Diego:
      - (10) Alabama 90, (7) Marquette 85
      - (2) UCLA 78, (15) Belmont 44
    - At Salt Lake City:
      - (3) Gonzaga 79, (14) Xavier (OH) 75
      - (6) Indiana 87, (11) San Diego State 83
    - NOTE: Games in San Diego were delayed by an hour due to a bomb threat inside Cox Arena.

== March 15, 2006 (Wednesday) ==
- Commonwealth Games, 2006 kicks off at Melbourne, Australia.
- World Baseball Classic, Second round
  - Pool 1:
    - South Korea defeats Japan, 2–1.
  - Korea advances to the semifinals.
  - Pool 2:
    - Cuba defeats Puerto Rico 4–3.
  - Cuba will play the Dominican Republic in the semifinals.
- Football: 2005–06 UEFA Cup – Round of 16, second leg, progressing teams shown in **bold**.
  - Hamburg 3–1 **Rapid Bucharest**
    - Aggregate score 3–3. Rapid win on away goals.
  - **Sevilla** 2–0 Lille
    - Aggregate score 2–1.
  - Roma 2–1 **Middlesbrough**
    - Aggregate score 2–2. Middlesbrough win on away goals.
- Dogsled racing: Musher Jeff King wins XXXIV Iditarod and becomes one of five four-time champions. At 50 years of age, he is also the oldest musher to win the race. The race covered more than 1,049 mi (1,600+ km) from Anchorage, across the United States state of Alaska.
- Cross-country skiing: Norwegian skier Marit Bjørgen wins the final sprint race of the season in Changchun, P.R. China to win the women's sprint World Cup overall. With one race to go in the overall World Cup, Bjørgen leads ahead of Canadian Beckie Scott. (Aftenposten)

== March 14, 2006 (Tuesday) ==
- World Baseball Classic, Second round
  - Pool 1:
    - Japan defeats Mexico, 6–1.
  - Pool 2:
    - Dominican Republic defeats Venezuela, 2–1.
  - The Dominicans, who give up only one hit to Venezuela, advance to the semifinals.
- Football: 2005–06 UEFA Champions League – Round of 16, second leg. Progressing team shown in **bold**.
  - **Internazionale** 1–0 Ajax (UEFA.com)
- College basketball: 2006 NCAA Division I men's basketball tournament: play-in game
  - Monmouth 71, Hampton 49: The Hawks will play Villanova in Philadelphia Friday (March 17) at approximately 3 pm US EST (2000 UTC). The win gives the NEC their first NCAA tournament win ever.

== March 13, 2006 (Monday) ==
- World Baseball Classic, Second round
  - Pool 1:
    - South Korea defeats USA, 7–3.
  - Pool 2:
    - Dominican Republic defeats Cuba, 7–3.
    - Venezuela defeats Puerto Rico, 6–0.
- College Basketball
  - John Chaney retires after 24 years as head coach of Temple University's men's basketball team; Dan Leibovitz will serve as interim acting head coach.
  - North Carolina, Duke, Ohio State and LSU are named the top seeds for the NCAA Division I Women's Basketball Tournament.
- Cricket:
  - English cricket team in India in 2005–06
    - India defeats England by nine wickets in the Second Test at Mohali, Chandigarh. India leads the three-Test series 1–0.
  - West Indian cricket team in New Zealand in 2005–06
    - New Zealand defeats West Indies by 27 runs in the First Test in Auckland. New Zealand leads the three-Test series 1–0.

== March 12, 2006 (Sunday) ==
- Dogsled racing: musher Jeff King is the first to reach Unalakleet in the Iditarod XXXIV, and wins the Gold Coast Award. The Inuit town of Unalakleet is the first checkpoint on the Norton Sound of the Bering Sea.
- World Baseball Classic, Second round:
  - Pool 1:
    - USA defeats Japan, 4–3.
    - South Korea defeats Mexico, 2–1.
  - Pool 2:
    - Cuba defeats Venezuela, 7–2.
    - Puerto Rico defeats Dominican Republic, 7–1.
- Auto racing:
  - Formula One: Defending champion Fernando Alonso defeats seven-time F1 champion Michael Schumacher to win the season-opening Bahrain Grand Prix.
  - A1 Grand Prix: France wins the World Cup of Motorsport by finishing second in the sprint race in Mazda Raceway Laguna Seca, California.
  - NASCAR: NEXTEL Cup: Matt Kenseth led the most laps, but Jimmie Johnson passed him in the last 300 yards under the green-white-checkers to win the UAW-DaimlerChrysler 400 in Las Vegas, Nevada.
- Cricket – one-day international: Australian cricket team in South Africa in 2005–06:
  - South Africa defeats Australia by one wicket in Johannesburg.
  - Australia compiled a world-record score of 434–4 from 50 overs, Ricky Ponting top-scoring with 164 off 105 balls. South Africa responded with 438–9, breaking Australia's record to win the match with one ball to spare. Herschelle Gibbs top-scored for South Africa with 175 off 111 balls, while Australian fast-bowler Mick Lewis (113–0 from 10 overs) became the first bowler to concede over 100 runs in a ten-over bowling spell. The match has been named as one of the all-time great one day game. Scorecard
    - See full article Australia in South Africa, 5th ODI, 2006.
- Rugby union: 2006 Six Nations Championship:
  - France 31 – 6 England
  - France trounce a hapless England side, and have the championship in their sights. (BBC)
- College basketball:
  - Conference championship games (winners, **in bold**, advance to the NCAA tournament):
    - ACC: (3) **Duke** 78, (11) Boston College 76
    - SEC: (16) **Florida** 49, South Carolina 47
    - Southland: **Northwestern State** 95, Sam Houston State 87
    - Big 12: (17) **Kansas** 80, (8) Texas 68
    - Big Ten: (20) **Iowa** 67, (7) Ohio State 60
  - Duke, UConn, Memphis and Villanova were named the top seeds for the NCAA Division I Men's Basketball Tournament. The play-in game will be played by Hampton and Monmouth on Tuesday, March 14.
- Biathlon:
  - Russia's second team of Anna Bogaliy-Titovets, Sergei Tchepikov, Irina Malgina and Nikolay Krouglov won the second World Championships in mixed relay at Pokljuka, Slovenia in strong winds. The four Russians were nearly a minute ahead of silver medalist team Norway, while bronze medalists France were a further minute adrift. (SI.com)
- Snowboard:
  - Swedish Olympic competitor Jonatan Johansson suffers a fatal accident during training for a FIS World Cup boarder cross race at Lake Placid, New York. (SI.com)

== March 11, 2006 (Saturday) ==
- Cricket:
  - Test cricket – Sri Lankan cricket team in Bangladesh in 2005–06:
    - Sri Lanka defeats Bangladesh by ten wickets in Bogra.
    - This match was notable for Sri Lankan spinner Muttiah Muralitharan taking his 600th Test wicket.
- Rugby union: 2006 Six Nations Championship:
  - Wales 18 – 18 Italy
    - Italy win their first-ever Six Nations point away from home, while Wales leave the Millennium Stadium to a chorus of boos.
  - Ireland 15 – 9 Scotland
    - The last-ever Six Nations match at Lansdowne Road before the stadium is redeveloped sees an old-fashioned tryless game in pouring rain. Ireland's five penalties are scored by Ronan O'Gara, while Scotland's three penalties are scored by Chris Paterson.
- College basketball:
  - Conference championship games (winners, **in bold**, advance to the NCAA tournament):
    - America East: **Albany** 80, Vermont 67
    - Conference USA: (5) **Memphis** 57, (24) UAB 46
    - Atlantic 10: **Xavier** 62, Saint Joseph's 61
    - MEAC: **Hampton** 60, Delaware State 56
    - Pac-10: (13) **UCLA** 71, Cal 52
    - MAC: **Kent State** 71, Toledo 66
    - Big East: **Syracuse** 65, (15) Pittsburgh 61
    - SWAC: **Southern** 57, Arkansas–Pine Bluff 44
    - WAC: (21) **Nevada** 70, Utah State 63 (OT)
    - Mountain West: **San Diego State** 69, Wyoming 64 (OT)
    - Big West: **Pacific** 78, Long Beach State 70
- Alpine skiing:
  - Benjamin Raich of Austria clinch the overall World Cup with four races to go after finishing fourth in the slalom race in Shiga Kogen, Japan. Michael Walchhofer lies second, 477 points adrift. (BBC)
  - Croatian Janica Kostelić wins the slalom World Cup after a second place in the race at Levi, Finland, though with a 254-point lead before the last four races in Åre she will have to take more points before she can be certain of the overall trophy. (BBC)
- Cross country skiing:
  - Tobias Angerer of Germany clinched the overall men's World Cup title despite finishing 40th in the 50 km freestyle race in Holmenkollen, Norway, over nine minutes behind Swedish winner Anders Södergren. It is the third successive time a German wins the World Cup. (in German) (ZDF.de)

== March 10, 2006 (Friday) ==
- Dogsled racing: Musher Paul Gebhardt is the first to reach Ruby in Iditarod XXXIV, and wins the First to the Yukon Award. Ruby is the first checkpoint on the Yukon River.
- Rugby union: Round 5 of the Super 14.
  - Chiefs 19–25 **Crusaders** in Hamilton. The Chiefs received one bonus point for finishing within 7 points of the winning score.
    - The Crusaders got an early lead, thanks to a Dan Carter try. However, the Chiefs kept in touch for the whole half and managed to take the lead in the final minute of the first half with Sitiveni Sivivatu scoring under the posts. The Crusaders managed to regain the lead in the second half and held on to the win in the dying moments.
- Baseball: World Baseball Classic
  - **Pool B**
    - Mexico defeats Canada 9–1.
    - United States defeats South Africa, 17–0 in five innings.
      - Mexico and the United States advance to the second round.
  - **Pool C**
    - Cuba defeats Netherlands 11–2; Cuba and Puerto Rico advance to round two
    - Netherlands defeats Panama 10–0 in seven innings
  - Pool D: Venezuela defeats Australia 2–0; Venezuela and Dominican Republic advance to round two
- NCAA Men's College Basketball
  - Conference championship games (winners, **in bold**, advance to the NCAA tournament):
    - Patriot League: **Bucknell** 74, Holy Cross 59

== March 9, 2006 (Thursday) ==
- Dogsled racing: Musher Doug Swingley is the first to reach Cripple in Iditarod XXXIV, and wins the Dorothy Page Halfway Award. Cripple is the official halfway point of the race on even-numbered years, when the race takes the northern route.
- Football:
  - 2005–06 UEFA Cup – Round of 16, first leg.
    - Rapid Bucharest 2–0 Hamburg
    - FC Basel 2–0 Strasbourg
    - Middlesbrough 1–0 Roma
    - Steaua Bucharest 0–0 Real Betis
    - Palermo 1–0 Schalke 04
    - Marseille 0–1 Zenit St. Petersburg
    - Udinese 0–0 Levski Sofia
    - Lille 1–0 Sevilla (UEFA.com)
  - Major League Soccer: The Austrian beverage company Red Bull purchases the MetroStars franchise from Anschutz Entertainment Group, and renames the team New York Red Bulls.
- Baseball: World Baseball Classic
  - Pool B: Mexico defeats South Africa 10–4.
  - Pool C: Puerto Rico defeats Netherlands 8–3.
  - **Pool D**
    - Venezuela defeats Italy 6–0.
    - Dominican Republic defeats Italy, 8–3.

== March 8, 2006 (Wednesday) ==
- Dogsled racing: Musher Doug Swingley is the first to reach McGrath in Iditarod XXXIV, and wins the Spirit of Alaska Award.
- Football: 2005–06 UEFA Champions League – Round of 16, second leg. Progressing teams shown in **bold**.
  - **A.C. Milan** 4–1 Bayern Munich
  - Liverpool 0–2 **Benfica**
  - **Arsenal** 0–0 Real Madrid
  - **Lyon** 4–0 PSV
  - The final fixture, Internazionale v Ajax will take place on Tuesday March 14,.
- Baseball: World Baseball Classic
  - **Pool B**
    - Canada defeats South Africa 11–8.
    - Canada defeats the United States 8–6.
  - **Pool C**
    - Puerto Rico defeats Panama 2–1
    - Cuba defeats Panama 8–6 after 11 innings
  - Pool D: Italy defeats Australia 10–0
- NCAA Men's College Basketball
  - Conference championship games (winners, **in bold**, advance to the NCAA tournament):
    - Northeast Conference: **Monmouth** 49, Fairleigh Dickinson 48
    - Big Sky Conference: **Montana** 73, Northern Arizona 60
- NBA:
  - Los Angeles Lakers 113, NO/OKC Hornets 107: In the first major sporting event in New Orleans since Hurricane Katrina, a sellout crowd at the New Orleans Arena sees Kobe Bryant score 40 points to lead the Lakers to the win.

== March 7, 2006 (Tuesday) ==
- Football: 2005–06 UEFA Champions League – Round of 16, second leg. Progressing teams shown in **bold**.
  - **FC Barcelona** 1–1 Chelsea
  - **Villarreal** 1–1 Rangers
  - **Juventus** 2–1 Werder Bremen
  - Villarreal and Juventus win on away goals.
- Baseball: World Baseball Classic
  - Pool D: Dominican Republic defeats Venezuela 11–5
  - Pool B: United States defeats Mexico 2–0
- NCAA Men's College Basketball
  - Conference championship games (winners, **in bold**, advance to the NCAA tournament):
    - Mid-Continent Conference: **Oral Roberts** 85, Chicago State 72
    - Horizon League: **Milwaukee** 87, Butler 71
    - Sun Belt Conference: **South Alabama** 95, Western Kentucky 70

== March 6, 2006 (Monday) ==
- Baseball: Hall of Famer Kirby Puckett dies at age 45 in a Phoenix hospital the day after suffering a stroke.
- Major League Soccer: After controversy over their original chosen nickname being potentially offensive to Hispanics, the Houston 1836 Football Club rename themselves to the Houston Dynamo. The team unveiled their new name and logo (with the same colors of orange, black and white) on the 170th anniversary of the end of the Battle of the Alamo.
- NCAA Men's College Basketball
  - Conference championship games (winners, **in bold**, advance to the NCAA tournament):
    - Colonial Athletic Association: **UNC-Wilmington** 78, Hofstra 67
    - MAAC: **Iona** 80, Saint Peter's 61
    - West Coast Conference: (4) **Gonzaga** 68, Loyola Marymount 67

== March 5, 2006 (Sunday) ==
- Dogsled racing: The Iditarod XXXIV restarts in Willow. This marks the beginning of the competitive portion of the race.
- NCAA Men's College Basketball
  - (4) Villanova 92, Syracuse 82: In the first advance sellout for basketball ever at the Carrier Dome, Allan Ray scores 28 points and Randy Foye adds 21 for the Wildcats to spoil Gerry McNamara's last regular-season game. McNamara led all scorers with 29.
  - Conference championship games (winners, **in bold**, advance to the NCAA tournament):
    - **Davidson** 80, Chattanooga 55: The Wildcats exorcised the demons of last season, in which they went 16–0 in the Southern Conference but lost in the conference tournament, by crushing the Mocs.
    - **Southern Illinois** 59, Bradley 46: The Salukis eased to the Missouri Valley Conference title.
- Baseball: World Baseball Classic
  - Pool A: South Korea defeats Japan 3–2, both advance to round two
- Baseball Hall of Fame center fielder Kirby Puckett, a superstar of the Minnesota Twins from 1984 to 1995, suffers a stroke in his Scottsdale, Arizona home.
- Association football: **Sydney FC** defeats the Central Coast Mariners 1–0 in the inaugural A-League Grand Final to become 2005–06 Champions. (Fox Sports)

== March 4, 2006 (Saturday) ==
- Dogsled racing: The ceremonial start the Iditarod XXXIV begins in Anchorage, Alaska. Eighty-three mushers and their teams of dogs are competing. The race runs more than 1,049 mi (1,600+ km) to Nome, across the United States state of Alaska.
- Baseball: World Baseball Classic
  - **Pool A**
    - Japan defeats Chinese Taipei 14–3
    - South Korea defeats China 10–1
- Rugby union: Super 14, Round 4
  - Waratahs 31–16 Sharks in Sydney
    - The Waratahs scored three tries to one, missing several opportunities in the final 10 minutes to get a fourth for a bonus point.
  - Crusaders 39–10 Blues in Christchurch.
    - The Blues led the Crusaders at half-time 10–9, despite having Joe Rokocoko sin-binned shortly before the interval. However the Crusaders performed well in the second half, keeping the Blues tryless, with Richie McCaw scoring 2 tries in a win over their biggest rivals.
  - Stormers 15–30 Highlanders in Cape Town.
    - The Highlanders won their second game in a row in South Africa, with wing Roy Kinikinilau scoring twice in the first half. TVZN
  - Cheetahs 27–25 Hurricanes in Bloemfontein
    - Super 14 newcomers the Cheetahs upset the Hurricanes, whose three previous matches all resulted in bonus point wins.
- Cricket: West Indies in New Zealand
  - Match five in the five match series, New Zealand led the series 4–0 (before match).
    - The West Indies defeat New Zealand by 3 wickets with 2 balls to spare. New Zealand win series 4–1.
      - New Zealand won the toss, electing to bat, with Scott Styris scoring 90 and Dwayne Smith taking 5–45, New Zealand ending all out on 233. Good opening bowling spells from Kyle Mills and Shane Bond restricted the West Indies to just 10–1 off 10 overs. After that, every batsmen made contributions and the West Indies got home in a tight match to avoid a whitewash.
- NCAA Men's College Basketball
  - (15) North Carolina 83, (1) Duke 76: The Tar Heels took control with an 11–0 run midway through the second half, and held on to spoil the Blue Devils' Senior Night at Cameron Indoor Stadium. Tyler Hansbrough led the Heels with 27 points; JJ Redick and Shelden Williams had 18 apiece for Duke.
  - Conference championship games (winners, **in bold**, advance to the NCAA tournament):
    - **Belmont** 74, Lipscomb 69 (OT): The Bruins won the latest incarnation of the Battle of the Boulevard, though not in Nashville, to earn the Atlantic Sun Conference title and their first NCAA berth ever.
    - **Winthrop** 51, Coastal Carolina 50: Craig Bradshaw's basket with 9.1 seconds left gave the Eagles the Big South Conference title.
    - **Murray State** 74, Samford 57: The Racers eased to the Ohio Valley Conference title.
- Boxing:
  - Miguel Cotto defeats Gianluca Branco by an eighth-round technical knockout, to retain his WBO world Jr. Welterweight title in Bayamón, Puerto Rico. AOL.com
  - Joe Calzaghe unifies his WBO world Super Middleweight title with the IBF one by defeating Jeff Lacy by a unanimous twelve rounds decision in Manchester, England. AOL.com

== March 3, 2006 (Friday) ==
- Cricket: Australia in South Africa
  - Match two in the five match ODI series.
    - South Africa defeat Australia by 196 runs.
      - South Africa made 289/7 off their 50 overs, with Herschelle Gibbs top scoring with 66. In reply, Australia crumbled without Ricky Ponting or Andrew Symonds, both unavailable for the match, making just 93 runs. Makhaya Ntini picked up 6–22 off 9.3 overs, his best figures in an ODI.
- Baseball: The inaugural World Baseball Classic begins.
  - **Pool A**
    - Japan defeats China 18–2 (invoking the mercy rule)
    - South Korea defeats Chinese Taipei 2–0
- Rugby union: Super 14, Round 4
  - Chiefs 35–17 Reds in Hamilton
    - The Chiefs got off to a good start in their home opener with a try in the first ten minutes. The Reds fought back, but the Chiefs ran away with the game in the second half, with Stephen Donald scoring 20 points. The Chiefs picked up a bonus point with four tries.
  - Brumbies 28–7 Cats in Canberra.
    - The Brumbies had their first win at home this season, scoring 3 tries in their win. However, the Brumbies missed out on a bonus point, kicking the ball away twice in injury time. The loss was the Cats second in a row.
- NCAA Men's College Basketball
  - Penn becomes the first team to clinch a berth to this year's NCAA tournament. Their 57–55 win over Yale, combined with a 61–46 Brown defeat of Princeton, gives the Quakers the Ivy League title with two games to play. Penn qualifies as regular-season champion, as the Ivy League is the only Division I conference that does not conduct a postseason tournament.

== March 2, 2006 (Thursday) ==
- NFL Football: As a result of the labor negotiations stalemate between the NFL Players and the owners, the league extends the start of the Free Agency period for a few days.
- NCAA Men's College Basketball
  - UAB 80, (3) Memphis 74: The Blazers deny the Tigers an unbeaten Conference USA campaign, holding them scoreless for more than 8 minutes near the end of the game. This was the first road loss of the season for the Tigers.
- Squash: One day after regaining the World No. 1 ranking, Jonathon Power announced his retirement from professional squash.

== March 1, 2006 (Wednesday) ==
- Cricket
  - West Indies in New Zealand
    - Match 4 in the 5 match One Day International series.
      - New Zealand defeat the West Indies by 91 runs in Napier. New Zealand go up 4–0.
        - New Zealand continued their fine form this series, with Lou Vincent scoring 102 in the Black Caps 324–6 off 50 overs. In reply, the inability to create and maintain partnerships cost the West Indies any chance at winning, with only Runako Morton scoring more the fifty, going on to make 110 not out. The West Indies will be hoping the arrival of Brian Lara can inspire them to avoid a whitewash in the final match in Auckland. cricinfo
- NCAA Men's College Basketball
  - Florida State 79, (1) Duke 74: Despite 30 points from JJ Redick and 20 from Shelden Williams, the Blue Devils go down to their first ACC defeat of the season in Tallahassee.
- Football results: Friendly internationals. With exactly 100 days to the start of the 2006 FIFA World Cup, managers try to finalise their squads:
  - Switzerland 3 – Scotland 1 (Reuters).
  - Northern Ireland 1 – Estonia 0 (Reuters).
  - England 2 – Uruguay 1 (Reuters).
  - Wales 0 – Paraguay 0 (Reuters).
  - Republic of Ireland 3 – Sweden 0
  - Russia 0 – Brazil 1
  - Italy 4 – Germany 1
  - France 1 – Slovakia 2
  - Netherlands 1 – Ecuador 0
  - Portugal 3 – Saudi Arabia 0
  - Spain 3 – Ivory Coast 2
  - Poland 0 – United States 1
  - Belgium 2 – Luxembourg 0 Match abandoned after 64 minutes due to a snowstorm.
  - Macedonia 0 – Bulgaria 1
  - Israel 0 – Denmark 2
  - Croatia 3 – Argentina 2
    - In a dramatic match, Croatia's Ivan Klasnić scored in the 3rd minute, but was canceled thirty seconds later by a Carlos Tevez goal, and two minutes later Lionel Messi gave Argentina the lead. Darijo Srna equalised late in the second half and Dario Šimić scored an injury time header to give victory to Croatia. (Fox Sports Australia)
  - Iran 3 – Costa Rica 2 (Soccerway), (Guardian)
